= 10th National Assembly of Slovenia =

10th National Assembly: 10. državni zbor

Type
- Type: Lower house

History
- Founded: 10 April 2026
- Preceded by: 9th National Assembly

Leadership
- President: Zoran Stevanović (Resni.ca) since 10 April 2026
- Vice-presidents: Danijel Krivec (SDS) since 21 April 2026; Franc Križan (Demokrati) since 21 April 2026; Nataša Avšič Bogovič (Svoboda) since 11 May 2026

Structure
- Seats: 90 – Members
- Political groups: Government coalition (43): SDS (28); NSi, SLS, Fokus (9); Demokrati (6); Supported by (5): Resni.ca (3); IMNS (2); Other parliamentary representation (2): Independent MPs (2); Katja Kokot (1); Aleksander Štorek (1); Opposition (40): Svoboda (29); SD (6); Levica (5)

Elections
- Voting system: Proportional representation
- Last election: 22 March 2026

Meeting place
- Great Hall of the National Assembly

Website
- www.dz-rs.si/wps/portal/en/Home

The 10th National Assembly of the Republic of Slovenia was elected at the legislative election held on 22 March 2026.

== Major events ==
- March 22, 2026: Parliamentary election
  - Svoboda is a relative winner with 29 deputies, SDS is second with 28 deputies. Seven lists in total reached 4% threshold.
- April 10, 2026: Constitutive session of the National Assembly
  - President Pirc Musar convened the first session of the newly elected National Assembly for April 10, 2026.
  - The mandate of the 15th Government (Golob cabinet) ends; it will remain in office in a caretaker capacity until new government is appointed.
  - Zoran Stevanović, leader of Resni.ca, was elected president of the National Assembly with 48 votes, supported by Resni.ca, SDS, NSi, SLS, Fokus and Demokrati.
- April 25, 2026: President Pirc Musar waived the right to nominate a candidate for the Prime Minister-designate in the first round of the election.
- April 29, 2026: The National Assembly passed the SDS's Bill amending the Government Act, which changes the Government's structure. The bill was supported by SDS, NSi, SLS, Fokus, Demokrati., and Resni.ca.
- May 5, 2025: The National Assembly took notice of the President Pirc Musar's decision not to nominate a candidate for a Prime Minister-designate, which formally concludes the first round of the election.
- May 19, 2026: Janez Janša has been proposed as a candidate for Prime Minister-designate with the support of 48 deputies from SDS, NSi, SLS, Fokus, Demokrati., and Resni.ca.
- May 22, 2026: Janez Janša was elected Prime Minister-designate with 51 votes.
- May 28, 2026: Janez Janša proposed a list of candidates for the ministers of the 16th Government. The National Assembly competenent committees held hearings on June 1-2, 2026, and confirmed all candidates.
- June 4, 2026: The National Assembly appointed the 16th Government of Slovenia (Janša IV Cabinet) with 49 votes.

== Composition ==
Parliamentary groups			Party Leader	Seats	
Parliamentary groups			Party Leader	2026 Election	Current
Svoboda	Freedom Movement; Gibanje Svoboda		Robert Golob MP	29 / 90	29 / 90
SDS	Slovenian Democratic Party; Slovenska demokratska stranka		Janez Janša	28 / 90	28 / 90
NSi, SLS, Fokus	NSi	New Slovenia - Christian Democrats; Nova Slovenija - Krščanski demokrati	Jernej Vrtovec	7 / 90	7 / 90
NSi, SLS, Fokus	SLS	Slovenian People's Party; Slovenska ljudska stranka	Tina Bregant	1 / 90	1 / 90
NSi, SLS, Fokus	Fokus	Focus of Marko Lotrič; Fokus Marka Lotriča	Marko Lotrič	1 / 90	1 / 90
SD	Social Democrats; Socialni demokrati		Matjaž Han MP	6 / 90	6 / 90
Demokrati.	Democrats. of Anže Logar; Demokrati. Anžeta Logarja		Anže Logar	6 / 90	6 / 90
Levica (Note: Slovenia's Left party removed Vesna from its parliamentary group name after Vesna demanded it, following poor election results where only Left candidates won seats.)	Levica	The Left; Levica	Asta Vrečko MP; Luka Mesec MP	5 / 90	5 / 90
Levica	Vesna	Vesna – Green Party; Vesna – zelena stranka	Urša Zgojznik; Uroš Macerl	0 / 90	0 / 90
Resni.ca	Resni.ca Party; Stranka Resni.ca		Zoran Stevanović MP	5 / 90	3 / 90
Independent	Independent MPs		Katja Kokot MP; Aleksander Štorek MP	0 / 90	2 / 90
IMNS	Representatives of the Italian and Hungarian national minorities Poslanca italijanske in madžarske narodne skupnosti		Ferenc Horváth (HU); Felice Ziza (IT)	2 / 90	2 / 90
Total				90 / 90	90 / 90

=== List of members ===
Constituency	Electoral districts										
Constituency	1	2	3	4	5	6	7	8	9	10	11
1 Kranj	Jesenice	Radovljica I	Radovljica II	Kranj I	Kranj II	Kranj III	Tržič	Škofja Loka I	Škofja Loka II	Kamnik	Idrija
1 Kranj	Alenka Bratušek (Svoboda)		Tea Košir (Demokrati.)	Sandra Gazinkovski (Svoboda)	Zoran Stevanović (Resni.ca)	Andrej Kosec (SDS)	Borut Sajovic (Svoboda)	Marjeta Šmid (Fokus); Tina Brecelj (Levica)	Žan Mahnič (SDS); Janez Žakelj (NSi)		Andrej Poglajen (SDS)
2 Postojna	Tolmin	Piran	Izola	Koper I	Koper II	Sežana	Ilirska Bistrica	Postojna	Nova Gorica I	Nova Gorica II	Ajdovščina
2 Postojna	Danijel Krivec (SDS)	Meira Hot (SD)	Robert Janev (Svoboda)	Tamara Kozlovič (Svoboda); Nataša Sukič (Levica)	Mateja Čalušić (Svoboda)		Adrijana Kocjančič (SDS)	Jana Gržinič (SDS)		Matej Arčon (Svoboda)	Zvonko Černač (SDS); Jernej Vrtovec (NSi)
3 Ljubljana Center	Logatec	Vrhnika	Ljubljana Vič-Rudnik I	Ljubljana Vič-Rudnik II	Ljubljana Vič-Rudnik III	Ljubljana Vič-Rudnik IV	Ljubljana Center	Ljubljana Šiška I	Ljubljana Šiška II	Ljubljana Šiška III	Ljubljana Šiška IV
3 Ljubljana Center	Zoran Mojškerc (SDS); Iva Dimic (NSi)		Alenka Jeraj (SDS)		Tamara Vonta (Svoboda)	Aleš Hojs (SDS); Tadej Ostrc (Demokrati.)	Luka Mesec (Levica)	Andrej Klemenc (Svoboda)	Duško Vujanović (Svoboda); Luka Goršek (SD)	Lucija Tacer Perlin (Svoboda)	
4 Ljubljana Bežigrad	Kočevje	Ribnica-Dobrepolje	Grosuplje	Ivančna Gorrica	Ljubljana Moste-Polje I	Ljubljana Moste-Polje II	Ljubljana Moste-Polje III	Ljubljana Bežigrad I	Ljubljana Bežigrad II	Domžale I	Domžale II
4 Ljubljana Bežigrad		Vinko Levstek (SDS); Janez Cigler Kralj (NSi); Barbara Levstik Šega (Demokrati.)		Janez Janša (SDS)		Lenart Žavbi (Svoboda); Nedeljko Todorović (Resni.ca)	Martin Premk (Svoboda)	Robert Golob (Svoboda)	Tereza Novak (Svoboda); Asta Vrečko (Levica)	Rado Gladek (SDS)	
5 Celje	Šentjur pri Celju	Celje I	Celje II	Žalec I	Žalec II	Mozirje	Velenje I	Velenje II	Slovenj Gradec	Ravne na Koroškem	Radlje
5 Celje	Jelka Godec (SDS)	Damjan Muzel (SDS)	Janja Sluga (Svoboda); Aleksander Štorek (Independent politician)		Aleksander Reberšek (NSi)	Jožef Jelen (SDS)	Andreja Katič (SD)	Manja Lesnik (SDS)	Dušan Stojanovič (Svoboda)	Metka Pešl Šater (Svoboda)	Robert Potnik (Demokrati.)
6 Novo Mesto	Črnomelj	Novo Mesto I	Novo Mesto II	Trebnje	Brežice	Krško	Sevnica	Laško	Litija	Hrastnik-Trbovlje	Zagorje
6 Novo Mesto	Jana Jerman (Svoboda)	Anja Bah Žibert (SDS)	Klemen Boštjančič (Svoboda)	Franci Kepa (SDS)		Janez Jože Olovec (SDS)	Tomaž Lisec (SDS); Srečko Ocvirk (SLS)	Matjaž Han (SD)	Vinko Logaj (Svoboda)	Nataša Avšič Bogovič (Svoboda)	Teodor Uranič (Svoboda)
7 Maribor	Šmarje pri Jelšah	Slovenska Bistrica	Slovenske Konjice	Ruše	Maribor I	Maribor II	Maribor III	Maribor IV	Maribor V	Maribor VI	Maribor VII
7 Maribor	Anton Šturbej (SDS); Martin Mikolič (NSi); Franc Križan (Demokrati.)	Karmen Furman (SDS)	Bojan Podkrajšek (SDS); Darko Ratajc (SD)				Katja Kokot (Independent politician)	Lena Grgurevič (Svoboda); Vladimir Šega (Levica)		Tomaž Lah (Svoboda)	Andreja Rajbenšu (Svoboda)
8 Ptuj	Lendava	Ormož	Ljutomer	Murska Sobota I	Murska Sobota II	Gornja Radgona	Lenart	Pesnica	Ptuj I	Ptuj II	Ptuj III
8 Ptuj	Dejan Süč (Svoboda)	Andrej Kosi (SDS); Mojca Žnidarič (Demokrati.)	Sara Žibrat (Svoboda)	Damijan Bezjak Zrim (SD)	Matej Grah (Svoboda)	Boris Mijič (Resni.ca)	Franc Breznik (SDS); Aleksander Gungl (NSi)		Jožef Lenart (SDS)		Suzana Lep Šimenko (SDS)

==== Membership changes ====
Vacated by			Reason	Successor		
Deputy	Group	Date	Reason	Deputy	Group	Date
Janez Janša	SDS	May 22, 2026	Elected Prime Minister-designate	Maruša Babnik	SDS	May 26, 2026
Jernej Vrtovec	NSi, SLS, Fokus	June 4, 2026	Appointed minister	Andrej Černigoj	NSi, SLS, Fokus	June 9, 2026
Janez Cigler Kralj	NSi, SLS, Fokus	June 4, 2026	Appointed minister	Janez Beja	NSi, SLS, Fokus	June 9, 2026
Tadej Ostrc	Demokrati.	June 4, 2026	Appointed minister	Dejan Zakrajšek	Demokrati.	June 9, 2026
Suzana Lep Šimenko	SDS	June 4, 2026	Appointed minister	Luka Simonič	SDS	June 9, 2026
Tea Košir	Demokrati.	June 4, 2026	Appointed state secretary	Elena Zavadlav Ušaj	Demokrati.	June 15, 2026
Barbara Levstik Šega	Demokrati.	June 4, 2026	Appointed state secretary	Ana Cajhen	Demokrati.	June 15, 2026
Elena Zavadlav Ušaj	Demokrati.	October 16, 2026	Resigned as state secretary	Tea Košir	Demokrati.	October 16, 2026
Boris Mijić	Resni.ca	October 16, 2026	Resignation	Martina Haring	Resni.ca	November 5, 2026
Tea Košir	Demokrati.	October 16, 2026	Resignation	Elena Zavadlav Ušaj	Demokrati.	October 19, 2026

== Leadership ==
=== Assembly leadership ===
The National Assembly has a president (speaker) and three vice-presidents (deputy speakers), of which one is elected from among the members of the largest opposition political group. All off them are elected with absolute majority (46 votes).

Position	MP
President	Zoran Stevanović (Resni.ca), from April 10, 2026
Vice-president	Danijel Krivec (SDS), from April 21, 2026
Vice-president	Franc Križan (Demokrati.), from April 21, 2026
Vice-president	Nataša Avšič Bogovič (Svoboda), from May 11, 2026

==== 10 April 2026 election of President ====
Candidate	Voting	Valid	Invalid	In favor	Against	Source
Zoran Stevanović (Resni.ca)	79	77	2	48	29	

==== 21 April 2026 election of Vice-Presidents ====
Candidate	Voting	Valid	Invalid	In favor	Against	Source
Danijel Krivec (SDS)	88	88	0	84	4	
Franc Križan (Demokrati.)	88	88	0	86	2	

==== 11 May 2026 election of Vice-President ====
Svoboda, which as the largest opposition parliamnetary group has a right to propose a third vice-president, proposed former group leader Avšič Bogovič for a vice-president.

Candidate	Voting	Valid	Invalid	In favor	Against	Source
Nataša Avšič Bogovič (Svoboda)	83	79	4	74	5	

22 September 2026 vote on motions to remove the President and Vice-President

The motion to remove President Stevanović (proposed by Svoboda, SD and Levica) failed, with 37 votes in favor and 49 against. Critics accused him of violating parliamentary rules and blocking parliamentary inquiries by rejecting the agenda of extraordinary sessions.

The motion to remove Vice-President Avšič Bogovič (proposed by SDS, NSi, and Resni.ca) also failed, receiving 45 votes in favor and 37 against, falling just one vote short of the 46 needed. She was accused of mismanaging a parliamentary session contrary to constitutional principles.

=== Parliamentary groups leadership ===
Parliamentary group		Group leader	Deputy group leaders
Svoboda	Svoboda Parliamentary Group; Poslanska skupina Svoboda	Borut Sajovic	Lenart Žavbi; Klemen Boštjančič
SDS	Parliamentary Group of the Slovenian Democratic Party; Poslanska skupina Slovenske Demokratske stranke	Jelka Godec	Zvonko Černač; Karman Furman
NSi, SLS, Fokus	NSi, SLS, Focus Parliamentary Group; Poslanska skupina NSi, SLS, Fokus	Janez Žakelj	Aleksander Reberšek
SD	Parliamentary Group of the Social Democrats; Poslanska skupina Socialnih Demokratov	Meira Hot	Luka Goršek
Demokrati.	Democrats. of Anže Logar Parliamentary Group; Poslanska skupina Demokrati. Anžeta Logarja	Elena Zavadlav Ušaj	Mojca Žnidarič
Levica	The Left Parliamentary Group; Poslanska skupine Levica	Asta Vrečko	Nataša Sukič
Resni.ca	Resni.ca Parliamentary Group; Poslanska skupina Resni.ca	Martina Haring	Nedeljko Todorović
IMNS	Parliamentary Group of the Italian and Hungarian national minorities Poslanska skupina italijanske in madžarske narodne skupnosti	Felice Ziza	Ferenc Horváth

=== Secretary-General ===
Secretary-General is head of parliamentary services, named by the National Assembly on the proposal of the Council of the President of the National Assembly.

Secretary-General	Term
Uršula Zore Tavčar	August 25, 2014 - May 11, 2025
Špela Ocvirk	from May 12, 2025

==== 11 May 2026 appointment of Secretary-General ====
Candidate	Voting	In favor	Against	Source
Špela Ocvirk (Ind.)	79	46	9	

== Working bodies ==
=== Committees ===
Committee	President	Vice-presidents	Members
Committee on the Economy, Labour, and Sport	Robert Potnik (Demokrati.)	Andrej Kosec (SDS)	Members Robert Potnik (Demokrati.) - President Andrej Kosec (SDS) - Vice-president Aleksander Reberšek (NSi, SLS, Fokus) - Vice-president Vladimir Šega (Levica) - Vice-president Mateja Čalušić (Svoboda) Rado Gladek (SDS) Matjaž Han (SD) Andrej Klemenc (SDS) Elena Zavadlav Ušaj (Demokrati.) Suzana Lep Šimenko (SDS) Vinko Levstek (SDS) Janez Jože Olovec (SDS) Metka Pešl Šater (Svoboda) Nedeljko Todorović (Resni.ca) Sara Žibrat (Svoboda)
Committee on the Economy, Labour, and Sport	Robert Potnik (Demokrati.)	Aleksander Reberšek (NSi, SLS, Fokus)	Members Robert Potnik (Demokrati.) - President Andrej Kosec (SDS) - Vice-president Aleksander Reberšek (NSi, SLS, Fokus) - Vice-president Vladimir Šega (Levica) - Vice-president Mateja Čalušić (Svoboda) Rado Gladek (SDS) Matjaž Han (SD) Andrej Klemenc (SDS) Elena Zavadlav Ušaj (Demokrati.) Suzana Lep Šimenko (SDS) Vinko Levstek (SDS) Janez Jože Olovec (SDS) Metka Pešl Šater (Svoboda) Nedeljko Todorović (Resni.ca) Sara Žibrat (Svoboda)
Committee on the Economy, Labour, and Sport	Robert Potnik (Demokrati.)	Vladimir Šega (Levica)	Members Robert Potnik (Demokrati.) - President Andrej Kosec (SDS) - Vice-president Aleksander Reberšek (NSi, SLS, Fokus) - Vice-president Vladimir Šega (Levica) - Vice-president Mateja Čalušić (Svoboda) Rado Gladek (SDS) Matjaž Han (SD) Andrej Klemenc (SDS) Elena Zavadlav Ušaj (Demokrati.) Suzana Lep Šimenko (SDS) Vinko Levstek (SDS) Janez Jože Olovec (SDS) Metka Pešl Šater (Svoboda) Nedeljko Todorović (Resni.ca) Sara Žibrat (Svoboda)
Committee on Infrastructure and Energy	Aleš Hojs (SDS)	Robert Potnik (Demokrati.)	Members Aleš Hojs (SDS) - President Damijan Bezjak Zrim (SD) - Vice-president Robert Potnik (Demokrati.) - Vice-president Martin Mikolič (NSi, SLS, Fokus) - Vice-president Klemen Boštjančič (Svoboda) Zvonko Černač (SDS) Jožef Jelen (SDS) Danijel Krivec (SDS) Tomaž Lah (Svoboda) Boris Mijič (Resni.ca) Srečko Ocvirk (NSi, SLS, Fokus) Metka Pešl Šater (Svoboda) Bojan Podkrajšek (SDS) Vladimir Šega (Levica) Teodor Uranič (Svoboda)
Committee on Infrastructure and Energy	Aleš Hojs (SDS)	Damijan Bezjak Zrim (SD)	Members Aleš Hojs (SDS) - President Damijan Bezjak Zrim (SD) - Vice-president Robert Potnik (Demokrati.) - Vice-president Martin Mikolič (NSi, SLS, Fokus) - Vice-president Klemen Boštjančič (Svoboda) Zvonko Černač (SDS) Jožef Jelen (SDS) Danijel Krivec (SDS) Tomaž Lah (Svoboda) Boris Mijič (Resni.ca) Srečko Ocvirk (NSi, SLS, Fokus) Metka Pešl Šater (Svoboda) Bojan Podkrajšek (SDS) Vladimir Šega (Levica) Teodor Uranič (Svoboda)
Committee on Infrastructure and Energy	Aleš Hojs (SDS)	Martin Mikolič (NSi, SLS, Fokus)	Members Aleš Hojs (SDS) - President Damijan Bezjak Zrim (SD) - Vice-president Robert Potnik (Demokrati.) - Vice-president Martin Mikolič (NSi, SLS, Fokus) - Vice-president Klemen Boštjančič (Svoboda) Zvonko Černač (SDS) Jožef Jelen (SDS) Danijel Krivec (SDS) Tomaž Lah (Svoboda) Boris Mijič (Resni.ca) Srečko Ocvirk (NSi, SLS, Fokus) Metka Pešl Šater (Svoboda) Bojan Podkrajšek (SDS) Vladimir Šega (Levica) Teodor Uranič (Svoboda)
Committee on Environment and Spatial Planning	Andrej Kosi (SDS)	Tomaž Lah (Svoboda)	Members Andrej Kosi (SDS) - President Tomaž Lah (Svoboda) - Vice-president Boris Mijič (Resni.ca) - Vice-president Bojan Podkrajšek (SDS) Nataša Avšič Bogovič (Svoboda) Tina Brecelj (Levica) Aleksander Gungl (NSi, SLS, Fokus) Andreja Katič (SD) Franci Kepa (SDS) Andrej Kosec (SDS) Manja Lesnik (SDS) Tomaž Lisec (SDS) Vinko Logaj (Svoboda) Teodor Uranič (Svoboda) Janez Žakelj (NSi, SLS, Fokus) Sara Žibrat (Svoboda) Dejan Zakrajšek (Demokrati.)
Committee on Environment and Spatial Planning	Andrej Kosi (SDS)	TBD (Resni.ca)	Members Andrej Kosi (SDS) - President Tomaž Lah (Svoboda) - Vice-president Boris Mijič (Resni.ca) - Vice-president Bojan Podkrajšek (SDS) Nataša Avšič Bogovič (Svoboda) Tina Brecelj (Levica) Aleksander Gungl (NSi, SLS, Fokus) Andreja Katič (SD) Franci Kepa (SDS) Andrej Kosec (SDS) Manja Lesnik (SDS) Tomaž Lisec (SDS) Vinko Logaj (Svoboda) Teodor Uranič (Svoboda) Janez Žakelj (NSi, SLS, Fokus) Sara Žibrat (Svoboda) Dejan Zakrajšek (Demokrati.)
Committee on Environment and Spatial Planning	Andrej Kosi (SDS)	Bojan Podkrajšek (SDS)	Members Andrej Kosi (SDS) - President Tomaž Lah (Svoboda) - Vice-president Boris Mijič (Resni.ca) - Vice-president Bojan Podkrajšek (SDS) Nataša Avšič Bogovič (Svoboda) Tina Brecelj (Levica) Aleksander Gungl (NSi, SLS, Fokus) Andreja Katič (SD) Franci Kepa (SDS) Andrej Kosec (SDS) Manja Lesnik (SDS) Tomaž Lisec (SDS) Vinko Logaj (Svoboda) Teodor Uranič (Svoboda) Janez Žakelj (NSi, SLS, Fokus) Sara Žibrat (Svoboda) Dejan Zakrajšek (Demokrati.)
Committee on Agriculture and Food Sovereignty	Katja Kokot (Independent politician)	Janez Beja (NSi, SLS, Fokus)	Members Katja Kokot (Independent politician) - President Janez Cigler Kralj (NSi, SLS, Fokus) - Vice-president Mateja Čalušić (Svoboda) - Vice- Tomaž Lisec (SDS) - Vice-president Franc Breznik (SDS) Luka Goršek (SD) Robert Janev (Svoboda) Jana Jerman (Svoboda) Tomaž Lah (Svoboda) Jožef Lenart (SDS) Manja Lesnik (SDS) Mojca Žnidarič (Demokrati.) Srečko Ocvirk (NSi, SLS, Fokus) Bojan Podkrajšek (SDS) Dejan Süč (Svoboda)
Committee on Agriculture and Food Sovereignty	Katja Kokot (Independent politician)	Mateja Čalušić (Svoboda)	Members Katja Kokot (Independent politician) - President Janez Cigler Kralj (NSi, SLS, Fokus) - Vice-president Mateja Čalušić (Svoboda) - Vice- Tomaž Lisec (SDS) - Vice-president Franc Breznik (SDS) Luka Goršek (SD) Robert Janev (Svoboda) Jana Jerman (Svoboda) Tomaž Lah (Svoboda) Jožef Lenart (SDS) Manja Lesnik (SDS) Mojca Žnidarič (Demokrati.) Srečko Ocvirk (NSi, SLS, Fokus) Bojan Podkrajšek (SDS) Dejan Süč (Svoboda)
Committee on Agriculture and Food Sovereignty	Katja Kokot (Independent politician)	Tomaž Lisec (SDS)	Members Katja Kokot (Independent politician) - President Janez Cigler Kralj (NSi, SLS, Fokus) - Vice-president Mateja Čalušić (Svoboda) - Vice- Tomaž Lisec (SDS) - Vice-president Franc Breznik (SDS) Luka Goršek (SD) Robert Janev (Svoboda) Jana Jerman (Svoboda) Tomaž Lah (Svoboda) Jožef Lenart (SDS) Manja Lesnik (SDS) Mojca Žnidarič (Demokrati.) Srečko Ocvirk (NSi, SLS, Fokus) Bojan Podkrajšek (SDS) Dejan Süč (Svoboda)
Committee on Finance	Rado Gladek (SDS)	Andrej Klemenc (Svoboda)	Members Rado Gladek (SDS) - President Andrej Klemenc (Svoboda) - Vice-president Suzana Lep Šimenko (SDS) - Vice-president Metka Pešl Šater (Svoboda) - Vice-president Klemen Boštjančič (Svoboda) Alenka Bratušek (Svoboda) Franc Breznik (SDS) Janez Cigler Kralj (NSi, SLS, Fokus) Jana Gržinič (SDS) Tomaž Lisec (SDS) Martin Mikolič (NSi, SLS, Fokus) Elena Zavadlav Ušaj (Demokrati.) Darko Ratajc (SD) Vladimir Šega (Levica) Nedeljko Todorović (Resni.ca)
Committee on Finance	Rado Gladek (SDS)	Luka Simonič (SDS)	Members Rado Gladek (SDS) - President Andrej Klemenc (Svoboda) - Vice-president Suzana Lep Šimenko (SDS) - Vice-president Metka Pešl Šater (Svoboda) - Vice-president Klemen Boštjančič (Svoboda) Alenka Bratušek (Svoboda) Franc Breznik (SDS) Janez Cigler Kralj (NSi, SLS, Fokus) Jana Gržinič (SDS) Tomaž Lisec (SDS) Martin Mikolič (NSi, SLS, Fokus) Elena Zavadlav Ušaj (Demokrati.) Darko Ratajc (SD) Vladimir Šega (Levica) Nedeljko Todorović (Resni.ca)
Committee on Finance	Rado Gladek (SDS)	Metka Pešl Šater (Svoboda)	Members Rado Gladek (SDS) - President Andrej Klemenc (Svoboda) - Vice-president Suzana Lep Šimenko (SDS) - Vice-president Metka Pešl Šater (Svoboda) - Vice-president Klemen Boštjančič (Svoboda) Alenka Bratušek (Svoboda) Franc Breznik (SDS) Janez Cigler Kralj (NSi, SLS, Fokus) Jana Gržinič (SDS) Tomaž Lisec (SDS) Martin Mikolič (NSi, SLS, Fokus) Elena Zavadlav Ušaj (Demokrati.) Darko Ratajc (SD) Vladimir Šega (Levica) Nedeljko Todorović (Resni.ca)
Committee on Justice	Andrej Poglajen (SDS)	Dejan Zakrajšek (Demokrati.)	Members Anja Bah Žibert (SDS) - President Dejan Zakrajšek (Demokrati.) - Vice-president Tina Brecelj (Levica) - Vice-president Zoran Mojškerc (SDS) - Vice-president Lena Grgurevič (Svoboda) Andreja Katič (SD) Katja Kokot (Independent politician) Andrej Kosec (SDS) Robert Potnik (Demokrati.) Janez Jože Olovec (SDS) Andrej Poglajen (SDS) Dušan Stojanovič (Svoboda) Lucija Tacer Perlin (Svoboda) Jernej Vrtovec (NSi, SLS, Fokus) Duško Vujanović (Svoboda)
Committee on Justice	Andrej Poglajen (SDS)	Tina Brecelj (Levica)	Members Anja Bah Žibert (SDS) - President Dejan Zakrajšek (Demokrati.) - Vice-president Tina Brecelj (Levica) - Vice-president Zoran Mojškerc (SDS) - Vice-president Lena Grgurevič (Svoboda) Andreja Katič (SD) Katja Kokot (Independent politician) Andrej Kosec (SDS) Robert Potnik (Demokrati.) Janez Jože Olovec (SDS) Andrej Poglajen (SDS) Dušan Stojanovič (Svoboda) Lucija Tacer Perlin (Svoboda) Jernej Vrtovec (NSi, SLS, Fokus) Duško Vujanović (Svoboda)
Committee on Justice	Andrej Poglajen (SDS)	Zoran Mojškerc (SDS)	Members Anja Bah Žibert (SDS) - President Dejan Zakrajšek (Demokrati.) - Vice-president Tina Brecelj (Levica) - Vice-president Zoran Mojškerc (SDS) - Vice-president Lena Grgurevič (Svoboda) Andreja Katič (SD) Katja Kokot (Independent politician) Andrej Kosec (SDS) Robert Potnik (Demokrati.) Janez Jože Olovec (SDS) Andrej Poglajen (SDS) Dušan Stojanovič (Svoboda) Lucija Tacer Perlin (Svoboda) Jernej Vrtovec (NSi, SLS, Fokus) Duško Vujanović (Svoboda)
Committee on the Interior and Public Administration	Žan Mahnič (SDS)	Luka Goršek (SD)	Members Žan Mahnič (SDS) - President Luka Goršek (SD) - Vice-president Jana Jerman (Svoboda) - Vice-president Anton Šturbej (SDS) - Vice-president Anja Bah Žibert (SDS) Janez Cigler Kralj (NSi, SLS, Fokus) Sandra Gazinkovski (Svoboda) Aleš Hojs (SDS) Andrej Kosi (SDS) Ana Cajhen (Demokrati.) Tereza Novak (Svoboda) Srečko Ocvirk (NSi, SLS, Fokus) Janja Sluga (Svoboda) Nataša Sukič (Levica) Tamara Vonta (Svoboda)
Committee on the Interior and Public Administration	Žan Mahnič (SDS)	Jana Jerman (Svoboda)	Members Žan Mahnič (SDS) - President Luka Goršek (SD) - Vice-president Jana Jerman (Svoboda) - Vice-president Anton Šturbej (SDS) - Vice-president Anja Bah Žibert (SDS) Janez Cigler Kralj (NSi, SLS, Fokus) Sandra Gazinkovski (Svoboda) Aleš Hojs (SDS) Andrej Kosi (SDS) Ana Cajhen (Demokrati.) Tereza Novak (Svoboda) Srečko Ocvirk (NSi, SLS, Fokus) Janja Sluga (Svoboda) Nataša Sukič (Levica) Tamara Vonta (Svoboda)
Committee on the Interior and Public Administration	Žan Mahnič (SDS)	Anton Šturbej (SDS)	Members Žan Mahnič (SDS) - President Luka Goršek (SD) - Vice-president Jana Jerman (Svoboda) - Vice-president Anton Šturbej (SDS) - Vice-president Anja Bah Žibert (SDS) Janez Cigler Kralj (NSi, SLS, Fokus) Sandra Gazinkovski (Svoboda) Aleš Hojs (SDS) Andrej Kosi (SDS) Ana Cajhen (Demokrati.) Tereza Novak (Svoboda) Srečko Ocvirk (NSi, SLS, Fokus) Janja Sluga (Svoboda) Nataša Sukič (Levica) Tamara Vonta (Svoboda)
Committee on Local Self-Government, Cohesion, and Regional Development	Matjaž Han (SD)	Zvonko Černač (SDS)	Members Matjaž Han (SD) - President Zvonko Černač (SDS) - Vice-president Mojca Žnidarič (Demokrati.) - Vice-president Jana Jerman (Svoboda) Andrej Kosec (SDS) Tamara Kozlovič (Svoboda) Jožef Lenart (SDS) Vinko Levstek (SDS) Boris Mijič (Resni.ca) Martin Mikolič (NSi, SLS, Fokus) Metka Pešl Šater (Svoboda) Andrej Poglajen (SDS) Andreja Rajbenšu (Svoboda) Dejan Süč (Svoboda) Marjeta Šmid (NSi, SLS, Fokus)
Committee on Local Self-Government, Cohesion, and Regional Development	Matjaž Han (SD)	Mojca Žnidarič (Demokrati.)	Members Matjaž Han (SD) - President Zvonko Černač (SDS) - Vice-president Mojca Žnidarič (Demokrati.) - Vice-president Jana Jerman (Svoboda) Andrej Kosec (SDS) Tamara Kozlovič (Svoboda) Jožef Lenart (SDS) Vinko Levstek (SDS) Boris Mijič (Resni.ca) Martin Mikolič (NSi, SLS, Fokus) Metka Pešl Šater (Svoboda) Andrej Poglajen (SDS) Andreja Rajbenšu (Svoboda) Dejan Süč (Svoboda) Marjeta Šmid (NSi, SLS, Fokus)
Committee on Defence	Srečko Ocvirk (NSi, SLS, Fokus)	Jožef Jelen (SDS)	Members Srečko Ocvirk (NSi, SLS, Fokus) - President Jožef Jelen (SDS) - President Duško Vujanović (Svoboda) - President Damijan Bezjak Zrim (SD) Tina Brecelj (Levica) Sandra Gazinkovski (Svoboda) Franci Kepa (SDS) Jožef Lenart (SDS) Žan Mahnič (SDS) Robert Potnik (Demokrati.) Martin Premk (Svoboda) Andreja Rajbenšu (Svoboda) Anton Šturbej (SDS) Teodor Uranič (Svoboda) Janez Žakelj (NSi, SLS, Fokus)
Committee on Defence	Srečko Ocvirk (NSi, SLS, Fokus)	Duško Vujanović (Svoboda)	Members Srečko Ocvirk (NSi, SLS, Fokus) - President Jožef Jelen (SDS) - President Duško Vujanović (Svoboda) - President Damijan Bezjak Zrim (SD) Tina Brecelj (Levica) Sandra Gazinkovski (Svoboda) Franci Kepa (SDS) Jožef Lenart (SDS) Žan Mahnič (SDS) Robert Potnik (Demokrati.) Martin Premk (Svoboda) Andreja Rajbenšu (Svoboda) Anton Šturbej (SDS) Teodor Uranič (Svoboda) Janez Žakelj (NSi, SLS, Fokus)
Committee on Health	Iva Dimic (NSi, SLS, Fokus)	Aleksander Gungl (NSi, SLS, Fokus)	Members Iva Dimic (NSi, SLS, Fokus) - President Aleksander Gungl (NSi, SLS, Fokus) - Vice-president Robert Janev (Svoboda) - Vice-president Jožef Lenart (SDS) - Vice-president Elena Zavadlav Ušaj (Demokrati.) - Vice-president Zvonko Černač (SDS) Karmen Furman (SDS) Jelka Godec (SDS) Jožef Jelen (SDS) Alenka Jeraj (SDS) Katja Kokot (Independent politician) Mojca Žnidarič (Demokrati.) Tamara Kozlovič (Svoboda) Tereza Novak (Svoboda) Darko Ratajc (SD) Dušan Stojanovič (Svoboda) Nataša Sukič (Levica) Sara Žibrat (Svoboda)
Committee on Health	Iva Dimic (NSi, SLS, Fokus)	Robert Janev (Svoboda)	
Committee on Health	Iva Dimic (NSi, SLS, Fokus)	Jožef Lenart (SDS)	
Committee on Health	Iva Dimic (NSi, SLS, Fokus)	Elena Zavadlav Ušaj (Demokrati.)	
Committee on Demography, Family, Social Policy and Disability	Aleksander Gungl (NSi, SLS, Fokus)	Sandra Gazinkovski (Svoboda)	Members Aleksander Gungl (NSi, SLS, Fokus) - President Sandra Gazinkovski (Svoboda) - Vice-president Jana Gržinič (SDS) - Vice-president Mateja Čalušić (Svoboda) Iva Dimic (NSi, SLS, Fokus) Karmen Furman (SDS) Luka Goršek (SD) Luka Mesec (Levica) Tereza Novak (Svoboda) Andrej Poglajen (SDS) Anton Šturbej (SDS) Lucija Tacer Perlin (Svoboda) Mojca Žnidarič (Demokrati.)
Committee on Demography, Family, Social Policy and Disability	Aleksander Gungl (NSi, SLS, Fokus)	Jana Gržinič (SDS)	Members Aleksander Gungl (NSi, SLS, Fokus) - President Sandra Gazinkovski (Svoboda) - Vice-president Jana Gržinič (SDS) - Vice-president Mateja Čalušić (Svoboda) Iva Dimic (NSi, SLS, Fokus) Karmen Furman (SDS) Luka Goršek (SD) Luka Mesec (Levica) Tereza Novak (Svoboda) Andrej Poglajen (SDS) Anton Šturbej (SDS) Lucija Tacer Perlin (Svoboda) Mojca Žnidarič (Demokrati.)
Committee on Education, Science, and Youth	Marjeta Šmid (NSi, SLS, Fokus)	Iva Dimic (NSi, SLS, Fokus)	Members Marjeta Šmid (NSi, SLS, Fokus) - President Iva Dimic (NSi, SLS, Fokus) - Vice-president Adrijana Kocjančič (SDS) - Vice-president Vinko Logaj (Svoboda) - Vice-president Matej Arčon (Svoboda) Damijan Bezjak Zrim (SD) Robert Janev (Svoboda) Alenka Jeraj (SDS) Franci Kepa (SDS) Andrej Klemenc (Svoboda) Franc Križan (Demokrati.) Tomaž Lisec (SDS) Damjan Muzel (SDS) Janez Jože Olovec (SDS) Nedeljko Todorović (Resni.ca) Asta Vrečko (Levica) Duško Vujanović (Svoboda)
Committee on Education, Science, and Youth	Marjeta Šmid (NSi, SLS, Fokus)	Adrijana Kocjančič (SDS)	Members Marjeta Šmid (NSi, SLS, Fokus) - President Iva Dimic (NSi, SLS, Fokus) - Vice-president Adrijana Kocjančič (SDS) - Vice-president Vinko Logaj (Svoboda) - Vice-president Matej Arčon (Svoboda) Damijan Bezjak Zrim (SD) Robert Janev (Svoboda) Alenka Jeraj (SDS) Franci Kepa (SDS) Andrej Klemenc (Svoboda) Franc Križan (Demokrati.) Tomaž Lisec (SDS) Damjan Muzel (SDS) Janez Jože Olovec (SDS) Nedeljko Todorović (Resni.ca) Asta Vrečko (Levica) Duško Vujanović (Svoboda)
Committee on Education, Science, and Youth	Marjeta Šmid (NSi, SLS, Fokus)	Vinko Logaj (Svoboda)	Members Marjeta Šmid (NSi, SLS, Fokus) - President Iva Dimic (NSi, SLS, Fokus) - Vice-president Adrijana Kocjančič (SDS) - Vice-president Vinko Logaj (Svoboda) - Vice-president Matej Arčon (Svoboda) Damijan Bezjak Zrim (SD) Robert Janev (Svoboda) Alenka Jeraj (SDS) Franci Kepa (SDS) Andrej Klemenc (Svoboda) Franc Križan (Demokrati.) Tomaž Lisec (SDS) Damjan Muzel (SDS) Janez Jože Olovec (SDS) Nedeljko Todorović (Resni.ca) Asta Vrečko (Levica) Duško Vujanović (Svoboda)
Committee on Culture	Alenka Jeraj (SDS)	Ana Cajhen (Demokrati.)	Members Alenka Jeraj (SDS) - President Ana Cajhen (Demokrati.) - Vice-president Tamara Vonta (Svoboda) - Vice-president Sara Žibrat (Svoboda) - Vice-president Adrijana Kocjančič (SDS) Manja Lesnik (SDS) Damjan Muzel (SDS) Bojan Podkrajšek (SDS) Elena Zavadlav Ušaj (Demokrati.) Martin Premk (Svoboda) Darko Ratajc (SD) Dejan Süč (Svoboda) Marjeta Šmid (NSi, SLS, Fokus) Nedeljko Todorović (Resni.ca) Asta Vrečko (Levica)
Committee on Culture	Alenka Jeraj (SDS)	Tamara Vonta (Svoboda)	Members Alenka Jeraj (SDS) - President Ana Cajhen (Demokrati.) - Vice-president Tamara Vonta (Svoboda) - Vice-president Sara Žibrat (Svoboda) - Vice-president Adrijana Kocjančič (SDS) Manja Lesnik (SDS) Damjan Muzel (SDS) Bojan Podkrajšek (SDS) Elena Zavadlav Ušaj (Demokrati.) Martin Premk (Svoboda) Darko Ratajc (SD) Dejan Süč (Svoboda) Marjeta Šmid (NSi, SLS, Fokus) Nedeljko Todorović (Resni.ca) Asta Vrečko (Levica)
Committee on Culture	Alenka Jeraj (SDS)	Sara Žibrat (Svoboda)	Members Alenka Jeraj (SDS) - President Ana Cajhen (Demokrati.) - Vice-president Tamara Vonta (Svoboda) - Vice-president Sara Žibrat (Svoboda) - Vice-president Adrijana Kocjančič (SDS) Manja Lesnik (SDS) Damjan Muzel (SDS) Bojan Podkrajšek (SDS) Elena Zavadlav Ušaj (Demokrati.) Martin Premk (Svoboda) Darko Ratajc (SD) Dejan Süč (Svoboda) Marjeta Šmid (NSi, SLS, Fokus) Nedeljko Todorović (Resni.ca) Asta Vrečko (Levica)
Committee on the European Union Affairs	Andreja Katič (SD)	Vinko Levstek (SDS)	Members Andreja Katič (SD) - President Vinko Levstek (SDS) - Vice-president Boris Mijič (Resni.ca) - Vice-president Franc Breznik (SDS) Iva Dimic (NSi, SLS, Fokus) Matej Grah (Svoboda) Jana Gržinič (SDS) Andrej Kosi (SDS) Ana Cajhen (Demokrati.) Tomaž Lah (Svoboda) Luka Mesec (Levica) Zoran Mojškerc (SDS) Lucija Tacer Perlin (Svoboda) Teodor Uranič (Svoboda) Duško Vujanović (Svoboda)
Committee on the European Union Affairs	Andreja Katič (SD)	TBD (Resni.ca)	Members Andreja Katič (SD) - President Vinko Levstek (SDS) - Vice-president Boris Mijič (Resni.ca) - Vice-president Franc Breznik (SDS) Iva Dimic (NSi, SLS, Fokus) Matej Grah (Svoboda) Jana Gržinič (SDS) Andrej Kosi (SDS) Ana Cajhen (Demokrati.) Tomaž Lah (Svoboda) Luka Mesec (Levica) Zoran Mojškerc (SDS) Lucija Tacer Perlin (Svoboda) Teodor Uranič (Svoboda) Duško Vujanović (Svoboda)
Committee on Foreign Policy	Franc Breznik (SDS)	Zoran Mojškerc (SDS)	Members Franc Breznik (SDS) - President Zoran Mojškerc (SDS) - Vice-president Dušan Stojanovič (Svoboda) - Vice-president Alenka Bratušek (Svoboda) Robert Golob (Svoboda) Matej Grah (Svoboda) Lena Grgurevič (Svoboda) Aleksander Gungl (NSi, SLS, Fokus) Meira Hot (SD) Maruša Babnik (SDS) Žan Mahnič (SDS) Ana Cajhen (Demokrati.) Nataša Sukič (Levica) Nedeljko Todorović (Resni.ca) Janez Žakelj (NSi, SLS, Fokus)
Committee on Foreign Policy	Franc Breznik (SDS)	Dušan Stojanovič (Svoboda)	Members Franc Breznik (SDS) - President Zoran Mojškerc (SDS) - Vice-president Dušan Stojanovič (Svoboda) - Vice-president Alenka Bratušek (Svoboda) Robert Golob (Svoboda) Matej Grah (Svoboda) Lena Grgurevič (Svoboda) Aleksander Gungl (NSi, SLS, Fokus) Meira Hot (SD) Maruša Babnik (SDS) Žan Mahnič (SDS) Ana Cajhen (Demokrati.) Nataša Sukič (Levica) Nedeljko Todorović (Resni.ca) Janez Žakelj (NSi, SLS, Fokus)
General Committee; A general-competence committee pending the formation of other committees.	Zvonko Černač (SDS)	Barbara Levstik Šega (Demokrati.)	Members Zvonko Černač (SDS) - President Barbara Levstik Šega (Demokrati.) - Vice-president Damijan Bezjak Zrim (SD) Janez Cigler Kralj (NSi, SLS, Fokus) Karmen Furman (SDS) Rado Gladek (SDS) Robert Janev (Svoboda) Andrej Klemenc (Svoboda) Katja Kokot (Independent politician) Andrej Kosi (SDS) Tomaž Lah (Svoboda) Tereza Novak (Svoboda) Andrej Poglajen (SDS) Andreja Rajbenšu (Svoboda) Aleksander Reberšek (NSi, SLS, Fokus) Asta Vrečko (Levica) Felice Ziza (IMNS)

=== Standing Commissions ===
Commission	President	Vice-presidents	Members
Commission for Petitions, Human Rights and Equal Opportunities	Tereza Novak (Svoboda)	Damjan Muzel (SDS)	Members Tereza Novak (Svoboda) - President Damjan Muzel (SDS) - Vice-president Nataša Sukič (Levica) - Vice-president Aleksander Štorek (Independent politician) - Vice-president Anja Bah Žibert (SDS) Tina Brecelj (Levica) Luka Goršek (SD) Jana Gržinič (SDS) Jana Jerman (Svoboda) Manja Lesnik (SDS) Zoran Mojškerc (SDS) Janez Jože Olovec (SDS) Andreja Rajbenšu (Svoboda) Dušan Stojanovič (Svoboda) Marjeta Šmid (NSi, SLS, Fokus) Lucija Tacer Perlin (Svoboda) Ana Cajhen (Demokrati.)
Commission for Petitions, Human Rights and Equal Opportunities	Tereza Novak (Svoboda)	Nataša Sukič (Levica)	Members Tereza Novak (Svoboda) - President Damjan Muzel (SDS) - Vice-president Nataša Sukič (Levica) - Vice-president Aleksander Štorek (Independent politician) - Vice-president Anja Bah Žibert (SDS) Tina Brecelj (Levica) Luka Goršek (SD) Jana Gržinič (SDS) Jana Jerman (Svoboda) Manja Lesnik (SDS) Zoran Mojškerc (SDS) Janez Jože Olovec (SDS) Andreja Rajbenšu (Svoboda) Dušan Stojanovič (Svoboda) Marjeta Šmid (NSi, SLS, Fokus) Lucija Tacer Perlin (Svoboda) Ana Cajhen (Demokrati.)
Commission for Petitions, Human Rights and Equal Opportunities	Tereza Novak (Svoboda)	Aleksander Štorek (Independent politician)	Members Tereza Novak (Svoboda) - President Damjan Muzel (SDS) - Vice-president Nataša Sukič (Levica) - Vice-president Aleksander Štorek (Independent politician) - Vice-president Anja Bah Žibert (SDS) Tina Brecelj (Levica) Luka Goršek (SD) Jana Gržinič (SDS) Jana Jerman (Svoboda) Manja Lesnik (SDS) Zoran Mojškerc (SDS) Janez Jože Olovec (SDS) Andreja Rajbenšu (Svoboda) Dušan Stojanovič (Svoboda) Marjeta Šmid (NSi, SLS, Fokus) Lucija Tacer Perlin (Svoboda) Ana Cajhen (Demokrati.)
Commission for Public Office and Elections	Karmen Furman (SDS)	Matej Grah (Svoboda)	Members Karmen Furman (SDS) - President Matej Grah (Svoboda) - Vice-president Andreja Katič (SD) - Vice-president Andrej Poglajen (SDS) - Vice-president Nataša Avšič Bogovič (Svoboda) Jelka Godec (SDS) Aleš Hojs (SDS) Ferenc Horváth (IMNS) Danijel Krivec (SDS) Luka Mesec (Levica) Elena Zavadlav Ušaj (Demokrati.) Aleksander Reberšek (NSi, SLS, Fokus) Borut Sajovic (Svoboda) Janja Sluga (Svoboda) Nedeljko Todorović (Resni.ca) Janez Žakelj (NSi, SLS, Fokus) Lenart Žavbi (Svoboda)
Commission for Public Office and Elections	Karmen Furman (SDS)	Andreja Katič (SD)	Members Karmen Furman (SDS) - President Matej Grah (Svoboda) - Vice-president Andreja Katič (SD) - Vice-president Andrej Poglajen (SDS) - Vice-president Nataša Avšič Bogovič (Svoboda) Jelka Godec (SDS) Aleš Hojs (SDS) Ferenc Horváth (IMNS) Danijel Krivec (SDS) Luka Mesec (Levica) Elena Zavadlav Ušaj (Demokrati.) Aleksander Reberšek (NSi, SLS, Fokus) Borut Sajovic (Svoboda) Janja Sluga (Svoboda) Nedeljko Todorović (Resni.ca) Janez Žakelj (NSi, SLS, Fokus) Lenart Žavbi (Svoboda)
Commission for Public Office and Elections	Karmen Furman (SDS)	Anja Bah Žibert (SDS)	Members Karmen Furman (SDS) - President Matej Grah (Svoboda) - Vice-president Andreja Katič (SD) - Vice-president Andrej Poglajen (SDS) - Vice-president Nataša Avšič Bogovič (Svoboda) Jelka Godec (SDS) Aleš Hojs (SDS) Ferenc Horváth (IMNS) Danijel Krivec (SDS) Luka Mesec (Levica) Elena Zavadlav Ušaj (Demokrati.) Aleksander Reberšek (NSi, SLS, Fokus) Borut Sajovic (Svoboda) Janja Sluga (Svoboda) Nedeljko Todorović (Resni.ca) Janez Žakelj (NSi, SLS, Fokus) Lenart Žavbi (Svoboda)
Commission for Relations with Slovenes in Neighbouring and Other Countries	Matej Arčon (Svoboda)	Andrej Černigoj (NSi, SLS, Fokus)	Members Matej Arčon (Svoboda) - President Iva Dimic (NSi, SLS, Fokus) - Vice-president Franci Kepa (SDS) - Vice-president Martin Premk (Svoboda) - Vice-president Sandra Gazinkovski (Svoboda) Robert Janev (Svoboda) Adrijana Kocjančič (SDS) Danijel Krivec (SDS) Suzana Lep Šimenko (SDS) Dušan Stojanovič (Svoboda) Nataša Sukič (Levica) Aleksander Štorek (Independent politician) Felice Ziza (IMNS)
Commission for Relations with Slovenes in Neighbouring and Other Countries	Matej Arčon (Svoboda)	Franci Kepa (SDS)	Members Matej Arčon (Svoboda) - President Iva Dimic (NSi, SLS, Fokus) - Vice-president Franci Kepa (SDS) - Vice-president Martin Premk (Svoboda) - Vice-president Sandra Gazinkovski (Svoboda) Robert Janev (Svoboda) Adrijana Kocjančič (SDS) Danijel Krivec (SDS) Suzana Lep Šimenko (SDS) Dušan Stojanovič (Svoboda) Nataša Sukič (Levica) Aleksander Štorek (Independent politician) Felice Ziza (IMNS)
Commission for Relations with Slovenes in Neighbouring and Other Countries	Matej Arčon (Svoboda)	Martin Premk (Svoboda)	Members Matej Arčon (Svoboda) - President Iva Dimic (NSi, SLS, Fokus) - Vice-president Franci Kepa (SDS) - Vice-president Martin Premk (Svoboda) - Vice-president Sandra Gazinkovski (Svoboda) Robert Janev (Svoboda) Adrijana Kocjančič (SDS) Danijel Krivec (SDS) Suzana Lep Šimenko (SDS) Dušan Stojanovič (Svoboda) Nataša Sukič (Levica) Aleksander Štorek (Independent politician) Felice Ziza (IMNS)
Commission for the National Communities	Ferenc Horváth (IMNS)	Dejan Süč (Svoboda)	Members Ferenc Horváth (IMNS) - President Dejan Süč (Svoboda) - Vice-president Felice Ziza (IMNS) - Vice-president Matej Arčon (Svoboda) Damijan Bezjak Zrim (SD) Mateja Čalušić (Svoboda) Robert Janev (Svoboda) Jožef Jelen (SDS) Alenka Jeraj (SDS) Franci Kepa (SDS) Andrej Kosi (SDS) Franc Križan (Demokrati.) Damjan Muzel (SDS) Marjeta Šmid (NSi, SLS, Fokus) Sara Žibrat (Svoboda)
Commission for the National Communities	Ferenc Horváth (IMNS)	Felice Ziza (IMNS)	Members Ferenc Horváth (IMNS) - President Dejan Süč (Svoboda) - Vice-president Felice Ziza (IMNS) - Vice-president Matej Arčon (Svoboda) Damijan Bezjak Zrim (SD) Mateja Čalušić (Svoboda) Robert Janev (Svoboda) Jožef Jelen (SDS) Alenka Jeraj (SDS) Franci Kepa (SDS) Andrej Kosi (SDS) Franc Križan (Demokrati.) Damjan Muzel (SDS) Marjeta Šmid (NSi, SLS, Fokus) Sara Žibrat (Svoboda)
Commission for the Rules of Procedure	Luka Mesec (Levica)	Lena Grgurevič (Svoboda)	Members Luka Mesec (Levica) - President Lena Grgurevič (Svoboda) - Vice-president Janez Jože Olovec (SDS) - Vice-president Nataša Avšič Bogovič (Svoboda) Zvonko Černač (SDS) Karmen Furman (SDS) Jelka Godec (SDS) Meira Hot (SD) Katja Kokot (Independent politician) Tamara Kozlovič (Svoboda) Franc Križan (Demokrati.) Vinko Levstek (SDS) Aleksander Reberšek (NSi, SLS, Fokus) Janja Sluga (Svoboda) Lenart Žavbi (Svoboda)
Commission for the Rules of Procedure	Luka Mesec (Levica)	Janez Jože Olovec (SDS)	Members Luka Mesec (Levica) - President Lena Grgurevič (Svoboda) - Vice-president Janez Jože Olovec (SDS) - Vice-president Nataša Avšič Bogovič (Svoboda) Zvonko Černač (SDS) Karmen Furman (SDS) Jelka Godec (SDS) Meira Hot (SD) Katja Kokot (Independent politician) Tamara Kozlovič (Svoboda) Franc Križan (Demokrati.) Vinko Levstek (SDS) Aleksander Reberšek (NSi, SLS, Fokus) Janja Sluga (Svoboda) Lenart Žavbi (Svoboda)
Constitutional Commission	TBD	TBD	

=== Standing Supervisory Commission ===
The leading positions and the majority of members in the supervisory commissions belong to deputies from the opposition parliamentary groups.

Commission	President	Vice-presidents	Members
Commission for Public Finance Control	Alenka Bratušek (Svoboda)	Andreja Rajbenšu (Svoboda)	Members Alenka Bratušek (Svoboda) - President Andreja Rajbenšu (Svoboda) - Vice-president Darko Ratajc (SD) - Vice-president Klemen Boštjančič (Svoboda) Rado Gladek (SDS) Matjaž Han (SD) Maruša Babnik (SDS) Andrej Klemenc (Svoboda) Dejan Zakrajšek (Demokrati.) Andrej Poglajen (SDS) Aleksander Reberšek (NSi, SLS, Fokus) Nataša Sukič (Levica) Lenart Žavbi (Svoboda)
Commission for Public Finance Control	Alenka Bratušek (Svoboda)	Darko Ratajc (SD)	Members Alenka Bratušek (Svoboda) - President Andreja Rajbenšu (Svoboda) - Vice-president Darko Ratajc (SD) - Vice-president Klemen Boštjančič (Svoboda) Rado Gladek (SDS) Matjaž Han (SD) Maruša Babnik (SDS) Andrej Klemenc (Svoboda) Dejan Zakrajšek (Demokrati.) Andrej Poglajen (SDS) Aleksander Reberšek (NSi, SLS, Fokus) Nataša Sukič (Levica) Lenart Žavbi (Svoboda)
Commission for the Supervision of Intelligence and Security Services	Janja Sluga (Svoboda)	Teodor Uranič (Svoboda)	Members Janja Sluga (Svoboda) - President Teodor Uranič (Svoboda) - Vice-president Damijan Bezjak Zrim (SD) Tina Brecelj (Levica) Aleš Hojs (SDS) Žan Mahnič (SDS) Dejan Zakrajšek (Demokrati.) Tamara Vonta (Svoboda) Janez Žakelj (NSi, SLS, Fokus)

=== Other bodies ===
Body	President	Members	
Council of the President of the National Assembly	Zoran Stevanović (Resni.ca)	Assembly President and vice-presidents (no voting right); Leaders of parliamentary groups (weighted voting right)	Members Zoran Stevanović (Resni.ca) - President Danijel Krivec (SDS) - Vice-president Franc Križan (Demokrati.) - Vice-president Nataša Avšič Bogovič (Svoboda) - Vice-president Borut Sajovic (Svoboda) Jelka Godec (SDS) Janez Žakelj (NSi, SLS, Fokus) Meira Hot (SD) Elena Zavadlav Ušaj (Demokrati.) Asta Vrečko (Levica) Katja Kokot (Independent politician) Felice Ziza (IMNS)

== Composition of the executive ==
Executive

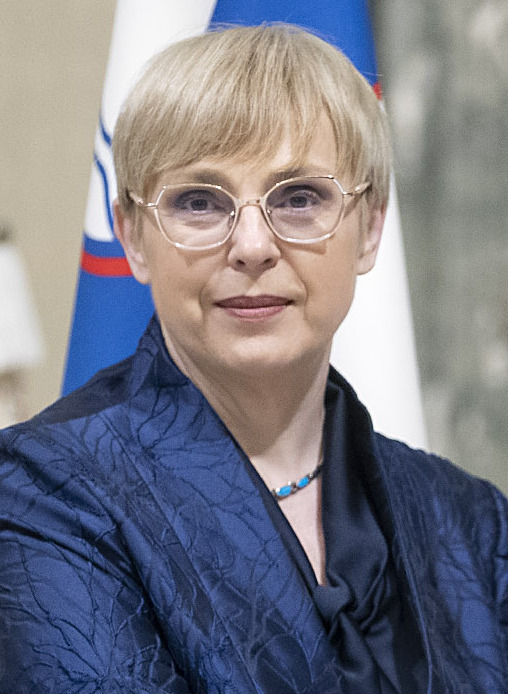
Incumbent
President
Nataša Pirc Musar
(Ind.)
from December 23, 2022

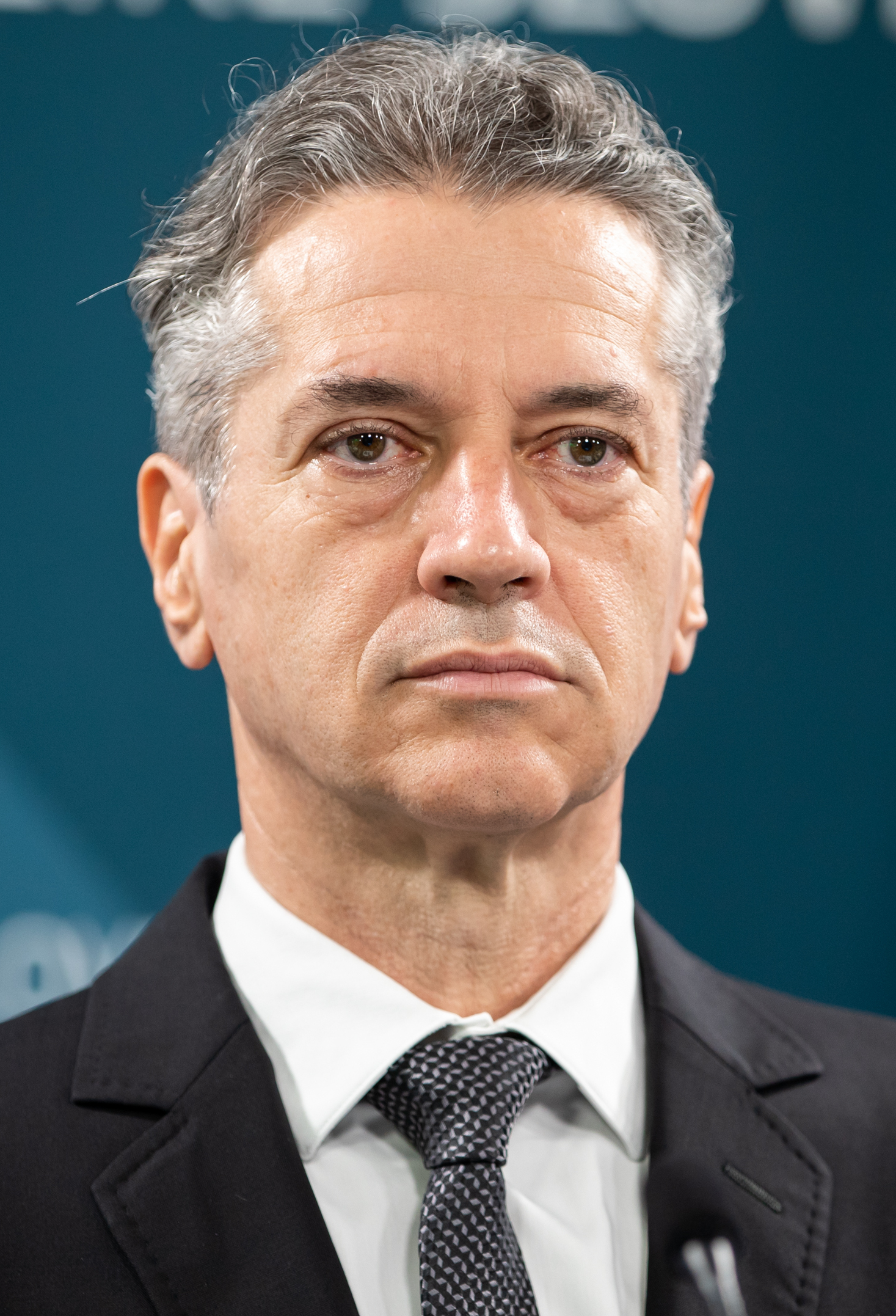
Former
Prime Minister
Robert Golob
(Svoboda)
June 1, 2022–June 4, 2026

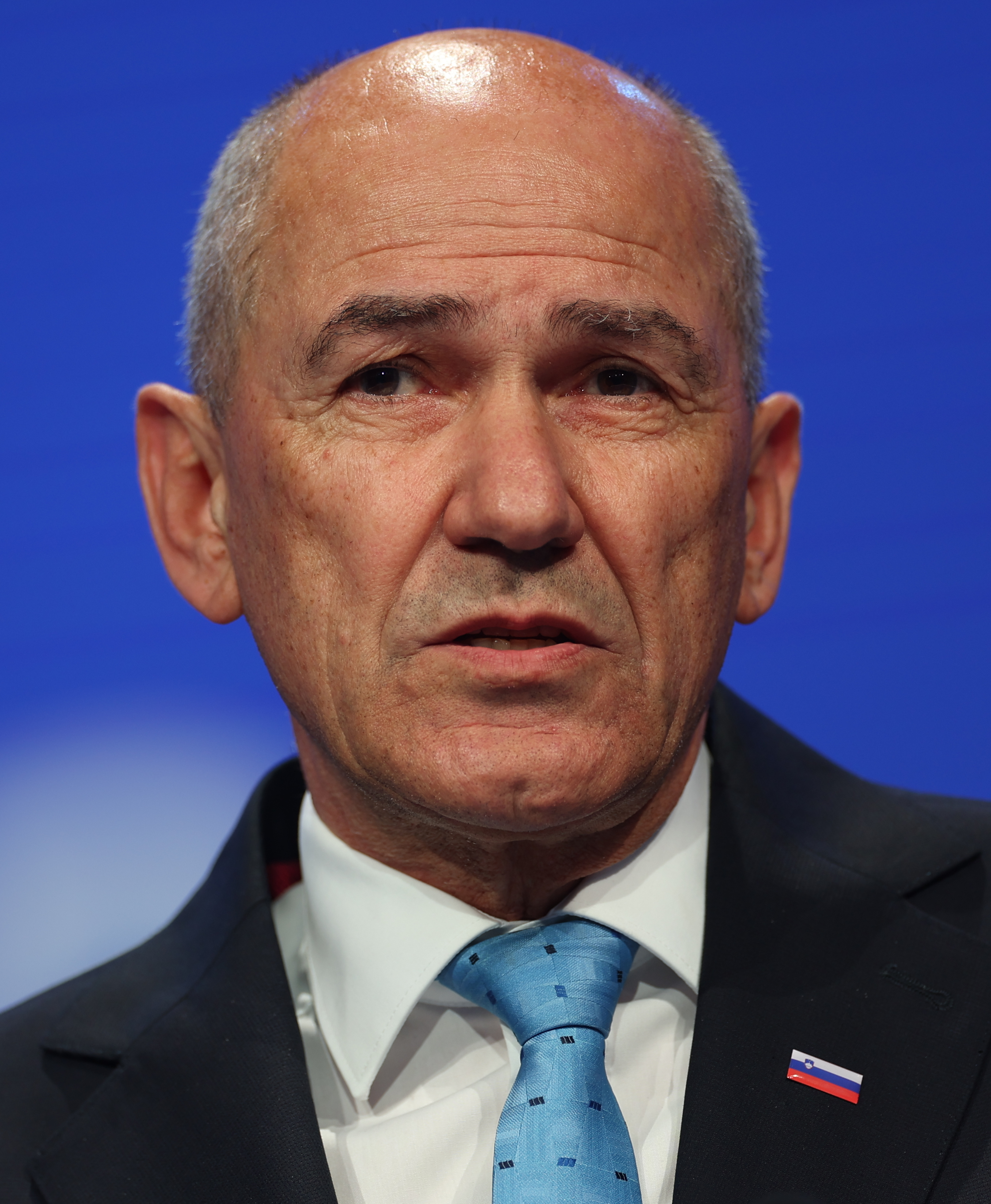
Incumbent
Prime Minister
Janez Janša
(SDS)
from May 22, 2026

The executive branch consists of the President of the Republic, who is directly elected, and the Government, which is elected by the National Assembly and depends on its confidence. The President of the Republic has no authority over the Government, except for the possibility of proposing a candidate for Prime Minister to the National Assembly for election. The National Assembly elects the Prime Minister and, on their proposal, ministers of the government. The President of the Republic calls elections to the National Assembly and, in the event of an unsuccessful government formation, dissoLevicaes the National Assembly and calls snap elections.

The National Assembly may impeach the President of the Republic, the Prime Minister or a government minister before the Constitutional Court. "The Government remains in office as long as it enjoys the confidence of the National Assembly, which may pass a vote of no confidence or elect a new Prime Minister through a constructive vote of no confidence.

=== President of the Republic ===
- Nataša Pirc Musar (Ind.), from 23 December 2022
  - Supported by Svoboda and SD in the run-off of 2022 election

=== Government ===
Government	Prime Minister	Tenure			Coalition parties	Notes
Government	Prime Minister	Took office	Left office	Duration (10th NA)	Coalition parties	Notes
15th Government of Slovenia	Robert Golob (Svoboda)	June 2, 2022	June 4, 2026	56 days	Svoboda (29); SD (6); The Left (5)	Caretaker government since April 10, 2026; Minority government (40 votes)
16th Government of Slovenia	Janez Janša (SDS)	June 4, 2026	Incumbent	171 days	SDS (28); NSi (7); SLS (1); Fokus (1); Demokrati. (6)	Minority government (43 votes); confidence and supply: Resni.ca (3 votes)

==== Activities prior to the constitution of the National Assembly ====
Following the elections, incumbent Prime Minister and leader of Svoboda Robert Golob initiated informal coalition talks with all "Demokrati.ocratic" parties, excluding the SDS. Although the NSi, SLS, Fokus list received a draft coalition agreement outlining policy priorities and ministerial distributions, they declined to participate, citing a lack of trust. Golob also proposed project-based cooperation to Resni.ca. However, negotiations reached an impasse due to mutual exclusions: Resni.ca and the Demokrati. refused to work with The Left, while The Left concurrently rejected cooperation with both Resni.ca and the NSi, SLS, Fokus list.

===== First round of election of prime minister-designate =====
Upon the constitution of the National Assembly, a 30-day period commenced for the President Pirc Musar to nominate a candidate for Prime Minister-designate. Consultations with parliamentary group leaders were scheduled for April 20, 2026, to determine support for the first round of elections. 46 votes were needed for election.

Zoran Stevanović, newly elected President of the Assembly and leader of Resni.ca, stated that his party will not join a government, led by Golob or Janša, but will support a candidate for prime minister-designate who aligns with the party's positions. While Stevanović previously signed a certified pledge in 2021 to never cooperate with Janša or the SDS, his position shifted following his election as President of the Assembly, for which he was also co-nominated and supported by the SDS. He first softened before eventually altered it to the point that the certified statement had lost its purpose with the party's election to the National Assembly, which required them to cooperate with SDS.

Golob denounced Stevanović's election and SDS cooperation as a fraud, vowing to prevent the formation of a right-wing populist government. Although Stevanović claimed the media inspired his candidacy for President of the Assembly, Svoboda Secretary General Matej Grah revealed that Stevanović had previously lobbied the party for support. Svoboda declined, instead unsuccessfully offering the position to the Demokrati.

RTV SLO reported alleged internal divisions within the Demokrati. parliamentary group, suggesting some deputies prefer a coalition with Svoboda, SD and NSi, SLS, Fokus over a right-wing government led by Janša and supported by Resni.ca. Party leader Anže Logar, who failed to secure a parliamentary seat, denied these claims. Evidence of specific voting patterns emerged after the Slovenian Press Agency (STA) obtained ballots from the secret ballot for President of the National Assembly. Strategically marked ballots suggested coordinated support for Stevanović: nine marks aligned with the number of deputies for NSi, SLS, Fokus list and six with the number of deputies for Demokrati., indicating unified backing from these two parliamentary groups. Four other ballots were marked similarly, most likely by Resni.ca deputies (excluding Stevanović, who was on the ballot).

24ur reported that after Stevanović's election, Janez Janša is said to have started talks with NSi, SLS, Fokus, Demokrati., and Resni.ca about forming a center-right government.

Matjaž Han, the leader of the SD, said that the chances of a new center-left government are small and that a center-right government currently has a greater potential for formation. The Left's co-coordinator, Asta Vrečko, believes similarly.

On April 16, 2026, Matej Grah commented on progress of coalition negotiations led by Svoboda, stating that Svoboda is waiting for Demokrati. to reply to their proposal of coalition agreement, however Demokrati. are no longer responding to their calls and official invitations at all. Svoboda added that negotiations in the future will be conducted through groups of each party, as they suspect that Anže Logar is not fully informing his party members about the progress of the negotiations. The group of Svoboda is reportedly led by Finance Minister Klemen Boštjančič. Demokrati. responded with withdrawal from negotiations, stating that Svoboda crossed the red line of political dialogiue.

On April 20, consultations with political parties were held by the President Pirc Musar. Robert Golob (Svoboda) announced that his party would withdraw into the opposition. He described the parties that elected National Assembly President Stevanović and are expected to form a new right-wing government as a “coalition of fraudsters.” Janez Janša (SDS) denied that a government was being formed and stated that SDS is also prepared for early elections or to go into opposition. Janez Cigler Kralj (NSi, SLS, Fokus) reiterated that their list is only prepared to participate in a center-right development government. Matjaž Han (SD) announced that his party would operate in opposition. Franc Križan (Demokrati.) stated that they are still negotiating with all who respect the party, doing so through their president Anže Logar, and that they are ready to cooperate with whoever will allow them to fulfill their electoral program. The Left was critical of the formation of a new center-right party and announced that it supports snap elections. Katja Kokot (Resni.ca) stated that they had also negotiated with SDS and found more common ground with them on substantive issues. President Pirc Musar responded that, for now, no candidate has secured the 46 votes of support needed to be elected Prime Minister.

On April 22, 2026, SDS introduced a bill to change a government structure, reducing number of ministries from 19 to 14. Other potential coalitions partners (NSi, SLS, Fokus and Demokrati.) did not co-sponsor the bill. Demokrati. and NSi, SLS, Fokus both supported the reduction of the number of ministries. On April 24, 2026, Janša stated that SDS will send a draft coalition agreement to those who will support the bill, but still expressed some level of reservation about forming a government if its majority will not be strong enough.

On April 25, 2026, President Pirc Musar announced that she will not nominate a candidate for Prime Minister-designate, since no candidate secured 46 votes in the National Assembly and she does not want to nominate a prime minister-designate for a minority government. This concludes the first round of election of prime minister-designate. Pirc Musar was criticized by some legal experts (e.g. Rajko Pirnat and Janez Pogorelec) for so quickly giving up the possibility of proposing a candidate, 15 days before the deadline. She also referred to the precedent of President Borut Pahor, who gave up the proposal in the first round of nominating a candidate for the Prime Minister-designate after the 2018 elections. Unlike Pirc Musar, Pahor only informed the National Assembly about this in 2018 when the deadline in the first round expired. The National Assembly will officially take notice of President Pirc Musar's decision on May 5, 2026, thereby formally concluding the first round of the election of prime minister-designate.

On April 29, 2026, the National Assembly passed a bill amending the Government Act, proposed by SDS, reducing the number of ministries from 19 to 14. The bill was supported by all present deputies of SDS, NSi, SLS, Fokus, Demokrati., and Resni.ca, signaling a possible new government coalition.

On May 5, 2025, the National Assembly took notice of the decision by the President Pirc Musar that she will not nominate a candidate for a Prime Minister-designate, which formally concludes the first round of the election of a Prime Minister-designate.

==== Second round of election of prime minister-designate ====
In the second round a candidate for the prime minister-designate can be nominated by the President Pirc Musar, each of the eight parliamentary groups, or a group of 10 deputies.

Janez Janša, leader of SDS, stated on May 5, 2026, that his party has agreed coalition agreement points with NSi, SLS, Fokus, and Demokrati. The second phase will invoLevicae coordinating the specific contents of the coalition agreement. On May 14 and 15, 2026, Demokrati. and NSi confirmed coalition agreement and expressed support for entering a coalition, led by SDS. SDS, SLS and Fokus confirmed it on May 18, 2026.

On May 19, 2026, group of 48 deputies (SDS, NSi, SLS, Fokus, Demokrati. and Resni.ca) proposed Janez Janša (SDS) as a candidate for the prime-minister designate. Manfred Weber, President of EPP, supported Janša, calling for a pro-EU and pro-Ukraine government, which he believes Janša is able to ensure.

Extraordinary session of the National Assembly in which election will take place will be held on May 22, 2026. Vice-president Avšič Bogovič proposed during the session of the Council of the President to postpone the election until May 26, 2026, since the May 22, 2026, is the deadline to file a constitutional complaint regarding the March 2026 election. The proposal was rejected. Some individuals and groups have speculated that election should be annulled due to a foreign election interference (Black Cube intelligence operation), similar to the annulment of 2024 Romanian presidential election. Two constitutional complaints were filed on May 21, 2026, one by group of 30 intellectuals, led by Dušan Keber, former LDS Minister of Health in Drnovšek's 4th and Rop's governments, and the other by Svoboda's candidate for deputy in 2026 election Darko Nikolovski, also co-signed by Svoboda's deputies Lucija Tacer Perlin and Tereza Novak.

On May 21, 2026, SDS, NSi, SLS, Fokus and Demokrati. signed a coalition agreement.

On May 22, 2026, Janez Janša was elected Prime Minister-designate with 51 votes, receiving at least one vote of support from future opposition deputies.

===== May 22, 2026 election of the prime-minister designate =====
Candidate	Voting	Valid	Invalid	In favor	Against	Source
Janez Janša (SDS)	87	87	0	51	36	

==== Appointment of the government ====
Janez Janša, Prime Minister-designate, must propose a list of ministers to the National Assembly within 15 days from his election. The National Assembly committees will hold hearing of proposed candidates for ministers. The National Assembly appoints the government with relative majority.

On May 28, 2026, Janez Janša proposed a list of candidates for ministers. Despite previous speculations, SLS, as part of the NSi, SLS, Fokus list and a coalition party, did not propose its own candidate for one of the ministries.

===== Hearings of candidates =====
Candidate	Party	Portfolio	Committee	Date	Voting result		Source
Candidate	Party	Portfolio	Committee	Date	Yes	No	Source
Andrej Šircelj	SDS	Minister of Finance	Finance	June 1, 2026	9	4	
Anže Logar	Demokrati.	Minister of Economy, Labour, and Sport	Economy, Labour, and Sport	June 1, 2026	9	6	
Franci Matoz	SDS	Minister of the Interior and Public Administration	Interior and Public Administration	June 2, 2026	8	6	
Jernej Vrtovec	NSi	Minister of Infrastructure and Energy	Infrastructure and Energy	June 1, 2026	9	5	
Borut Rončević	SDS	Minister of Education, Science, and Youth	Education, Science, and Youth	June 1 and 2, 2026	9	5	
Tadej Ostrc	Demokrati.	Minister of Health	Health	June 1, 2026	11	4	
Polona Rifelj	SDS	Minister of the Environment and Spatial Planning	Environment and Spatial Planning	June 2, 2026	10	1	
Mateja Ribič	NSi	Minister of Demography, Family, and Social Affairs	Demography, Family, Social Policy and Disability	June 2, 2026	8	6	
Mihael Zupančič	Demokrati.	Minister of Justice	Justice	June 2, 2026	9	6	
Janez Cigler Kralj	NSi	Minister of Agriculture	Agriculture and Food Sovereignty	June 1, 2026	9	6	
Ignacija Fridl Jarc	SDS	Minister of Culture	Culture	June 1, 2026	9	4	
Monika Kirbiš Rojs	Fokus	Minister of Local Self-Government, Cohesion, and Regional Development	Local Self-Government, Cohesion, and Regional Development	June 2, 2026	9	0	
Valentin Hajdinjak	NSi	Minister of Defence	Defence	June 1, 2026	8	6	
Tone Kajzer	SDS	Minister of Foreign and European Affairs	Foreign Policy	June 2, 2026	8	0	
Tone Kajzer	SDS	Minister of Foreign and European Affairs	EU Affairs	June 2, 2026	7	1	
Suzana Lep Šimenko	SDS	Minister without portfolio for Relations between the Republic of Slovenia and the Autochthonous Slovenian National Community in Neighbouring Countries, and between the Republic of Slovenia and Slovenians Abroad	Relations with Slovenes in Neighbouring and Other Countries	June 2, 2026	7	0	

===== June 4, 2026 vote on the apponitment of the government =====
Candidate	Voting	In favor	Against	Source
16th Government of Slovenia; Prime Minister Janez Janša (SDS)	79	49	30	

== Major legislation ==
Act	Proposed by	Adopted	Notes	Referendum proposed
Law on Intervention Measures for the Development of Slovenia; Zakon o interventnih ukrepih za razvoj Slovenije (ZIURS)	NSi, SLS, Fokus, Demokrati., Resni.ca	April 10, 2026	The law favorably changes the tax system for sole traders, introduces a social security contributions cap at €7,500 gross salary, reduces rental tax, allows for the payment of 100% pension to retirees who continue working after retirement, introduces automatic termination of employment when retirement conditions are met, abolishes the long-term care contribution for retirees, reduces VAT for basic foods and fuels. It is estimated that the law could cause a reduction in budget revenues of up to €1.1 billion.	Yes - The Assembly rejected the referendum due to constitutional prohibition.
Law on Mandatory Testing of Officials for Prohibited Drugs; Zakon o obveznem testiranju funkcionarjev na prepovedane droge	Resni.ca	TBD	The proposal introduces a system of random testing for members of parliament, the prime minister, ministers, and state secretaries for banned drugs no more than twice a year.	TBD
