= Chairperson of the National Assembly =

Chairperson (or Chairman or Chairwoman) of the National Assembly may refer to:

- Chairperson of the National Assembly of Bulgaria
- Chairperson of the National Assembly (Nepal)
- Chairman of the National Assembly of Suriname
- Chairman of the National Assembly of Vietnam

== See also ==
- President of the National Assembly (disambiguation)
- Speaker of the National Assembly (disambiguation)
