= President of the National Assembly of Slovenia =

President of the National Assembly of the Republic of Slovenia
- Coat of Arms of the Republic of Slovenia

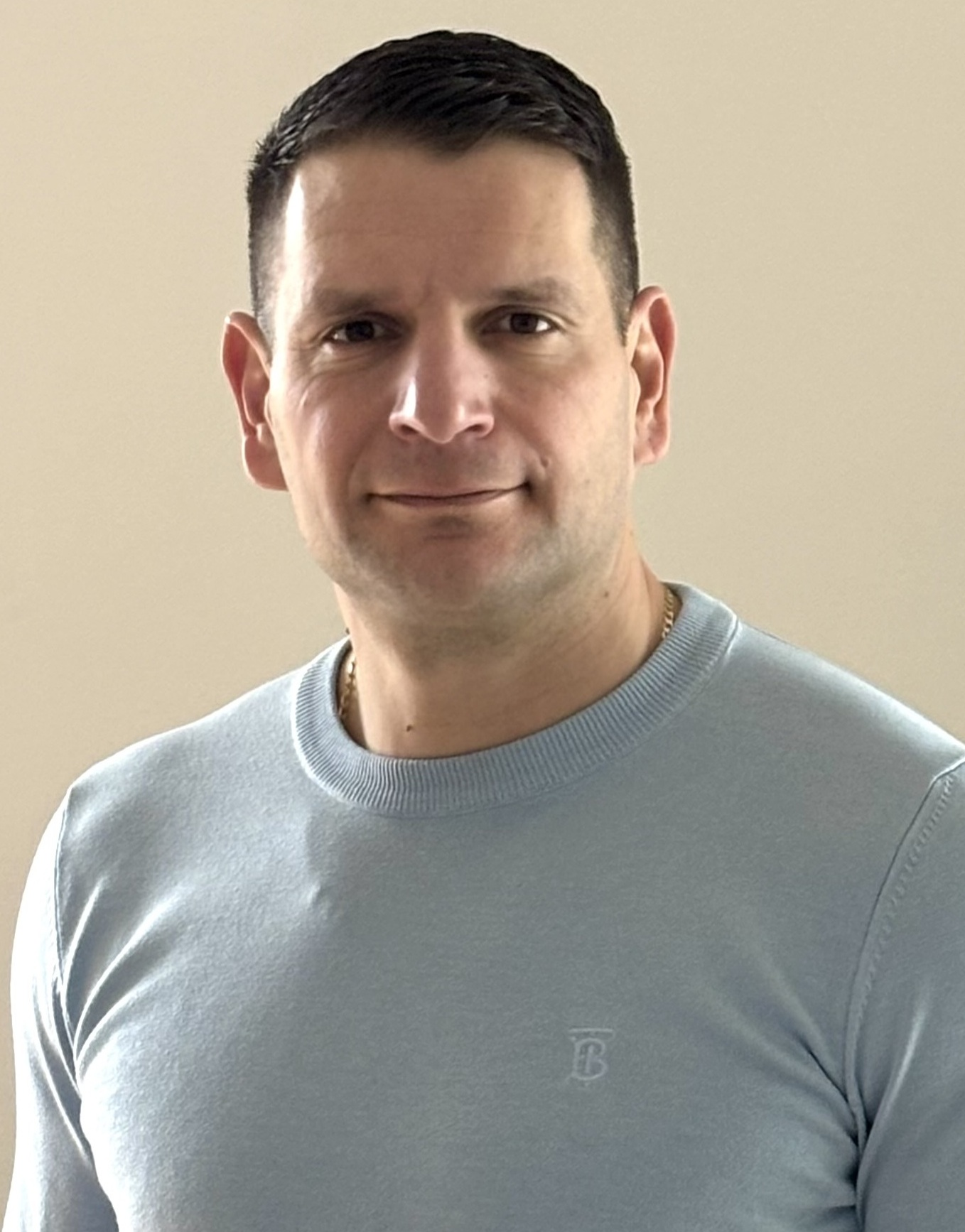
- Incumbent; Zoran Stevanović since April 10, 2026
- National Assembly of Slovenia
- Style: Mr./Madam President (informal); Mr./Madam President of the National Assembly (formal)
- Status: Presiding officer
- Seat: Building of the National Assembly of Slovenia, Ljubljana, Slovenia
- Nominator: 10 deputies
- Appointer: National Assembly of Slovenia
- Term length: At the Assembly pleasure; elected at the beginning of the new Assembly by an absolute majority of the deputies, and upon a vacancy.
- Constituting instrument: Constitution of the Republic of Slovenia, Article 84
- Formation: December 12, 1991; 34 years ago (Adoption of the Constitution)
- First holder: France Bučar as President of the Constitutional National Assembly
- Salary: € 8.900,43 monthly
- Website: www.dz-rs.si

The President of the National Assembly of the Republic of Slovenia (Slovene: Predsednik Državnega zbora Republike Slovenije) is the presiding officer of the National Assembly of the Republic of Slovenia. The office was formally established with the Constitution of the Republic of Slovenia in 1991. The first president of the National Assembly, Herman Rigelnik, took office after the first election to the National Assembly in 1992. However France Bučar is considered the first president being the president of the Constitutional National Assembly of Slovenia, established following the first democratic elections in Slovenia in 1990.

The Constitution and the Rules of Procedure of the National Assembly do not explicitly provide that the president must be elected from among the deputies. Nevertheless, a constitutional custom has been established, and every president thus far has been elected from among the deputies.

The President of the National Assembly is the de facto deputy to the President of the Republic, as they temporarily perform the duties of the office in the event of a permanent inability, death, resignation, or other cessation of the President's term until a new President is elected.

The 17th and current President of the National Assembly (10th legislature) is Zoran Stevanović, leader of Resni.ca.

== Election ==
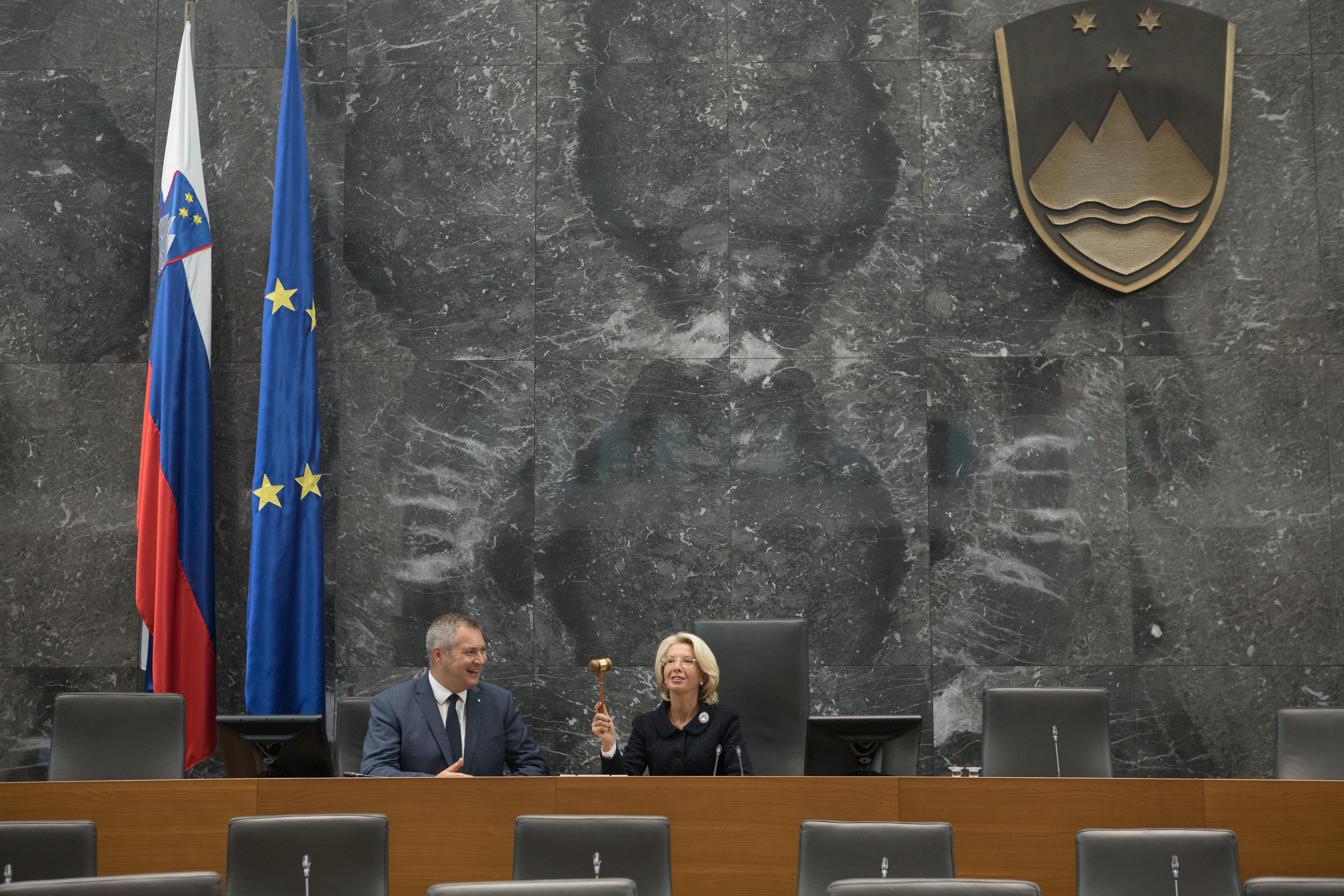
Chairwoman (Speaker) of Seimas Ināra Mūrniece seating in the presiding officer's chair in the Great Hall during her visit to the National Assembly, hosted by then President Dejan Židan (on the left).

According to Article 84 of the Constitution the National Assembly has a president who is elected by a majority vote of all deputies. Candidates for the President and Vice-President of the National Assembly may be proposed by at least ten deputies. The vote is by secret ballot.

== Duties ==
The President of the National Assembly performs various duties, the most central of which are convening and presiding over sessions of the National Assembly, representing the National Assembly, signing laws and other acts adopted by the National Assembly, and assigning matters to National Assembly committees for consideration, among others.

The President of the National Assembly holds office until the election of a new President (even if they were not re-elected to the National Assembly). Following elections and after the President of the Republic convenes the first session of the National Assembly, the outgoing President leads the preparations for the first session of the newly elected National Assembly.

== Political role ==
The position of the President of the National Assembly is political and is more similar to that of the Speaker of the US House of Representatives than to that of the Speaker of the UK House of Commons. The President plays an important role in implementing the government's political agenda in the National Assembly through legislative and other procedures. The President remains a voting member of the national assembly and a member of the parliamentary group of the party on whose list they were elected to the National Assembly. Nevertheless, in accordance with parliamentary practice, the President does not express his political or other views when chairing the sessions, but impartially presides over the sessions of the Assembly. If the President wishes to debate on a topic on the agenda, they hand over the chairing of the sessions to one of the Vice-Presidents for the time being. The same applies to the Vice-Presidents of the National Assembly.

The position of the President of the National Assembly is usually also part of the coalition negotiations for the formation of a new government and the distribution of positions among the coalition parties (it is attributed the weight of two ministerial posts). The position of the President of the National Assembly usually, but not always, belonged to the second largest coalition party. In cases where the largest party had significantly more deputies; e.g. SDS in 2004 (Cukjati), SMC in 2014 (Brglez) and Svoboda in 2022 (Klakočar Zupančič), the largest party also retained the position of President of the National Assembly to itself.

== Vice-presidents of the National Assembly ==
The President is assisted in the performance of his duties, particularly in chairing sessions of the National Assembly, by three Vice-Presidents.

Vice-presidents are elected according to the same procedure as the president, but only after the president has been elected.One of the three vice-presidential positions always belongs to the largest opposition parliamentary group, but this vice-president must also be elected by a majority of votes of all deputies.

== Council of the President of the National Assembly ==
The Council of the Speaker of the National Assembly is an advisory body to the President of Slovenia.

The Council consists of the President and Vice-Presidents of the National Assembly, leaders of parliamentary groups and deputies of national minorities.

== Former living speakers ==
Former Presidents of the National Assembly of Slovenia<ref>"Nekdanji predsedniki". Državni zbor Republike Slovenije - www.dz-rs.si.</ref>

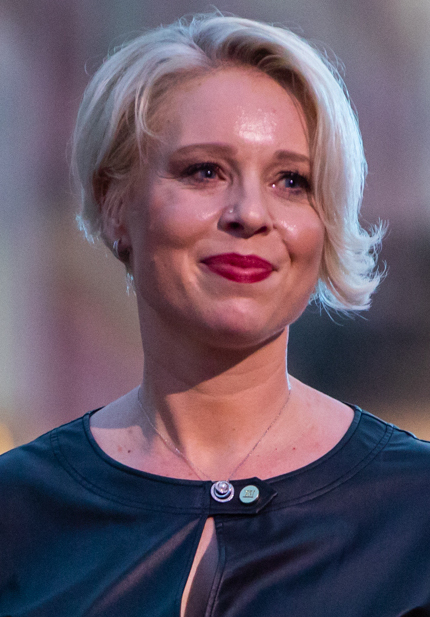
16th President
Urška Klakočar Zupančič
(2022-2026)
Svoboda

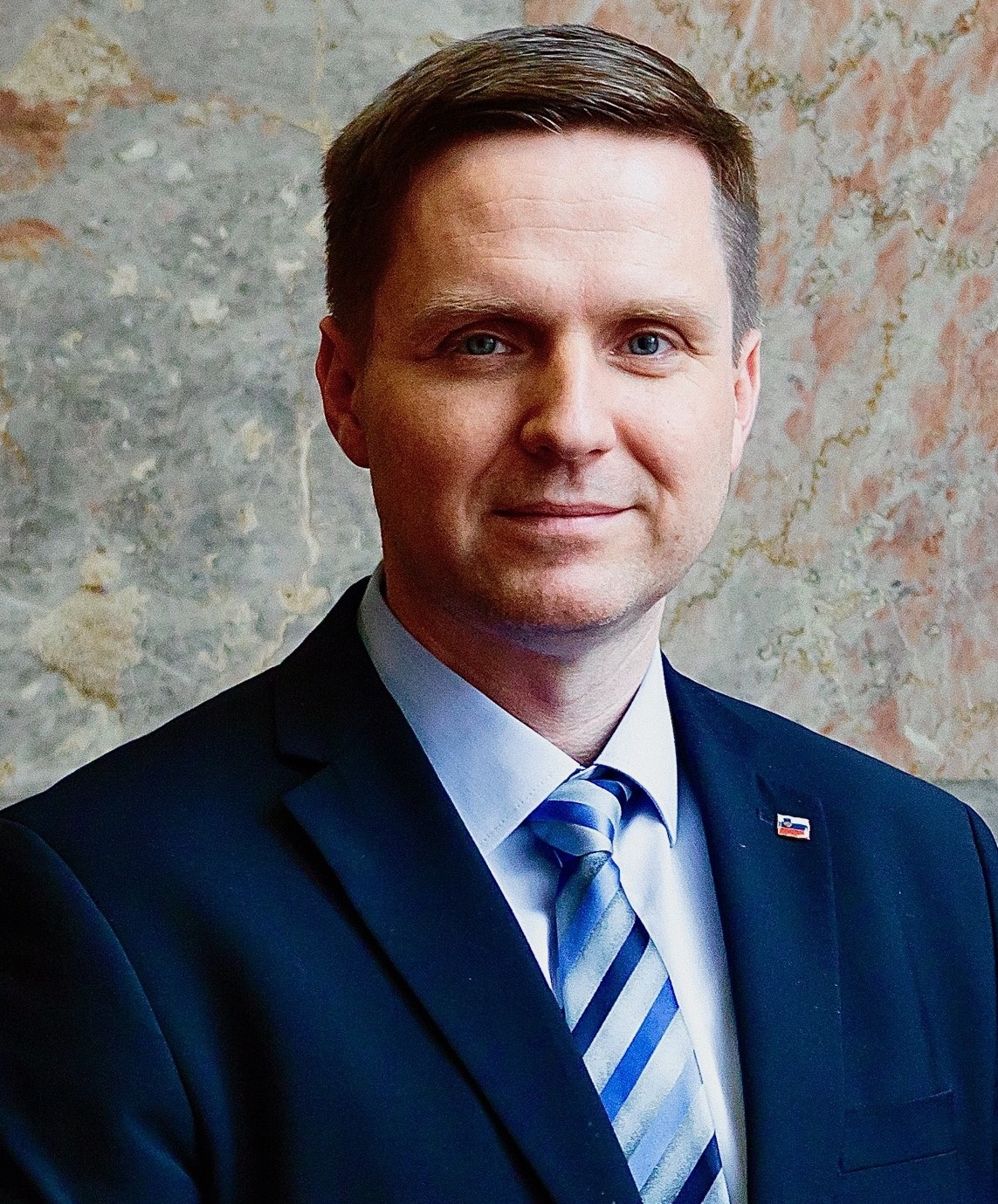
15th President
Igor Zorčič
(2020-2022)
SMC and LIDE

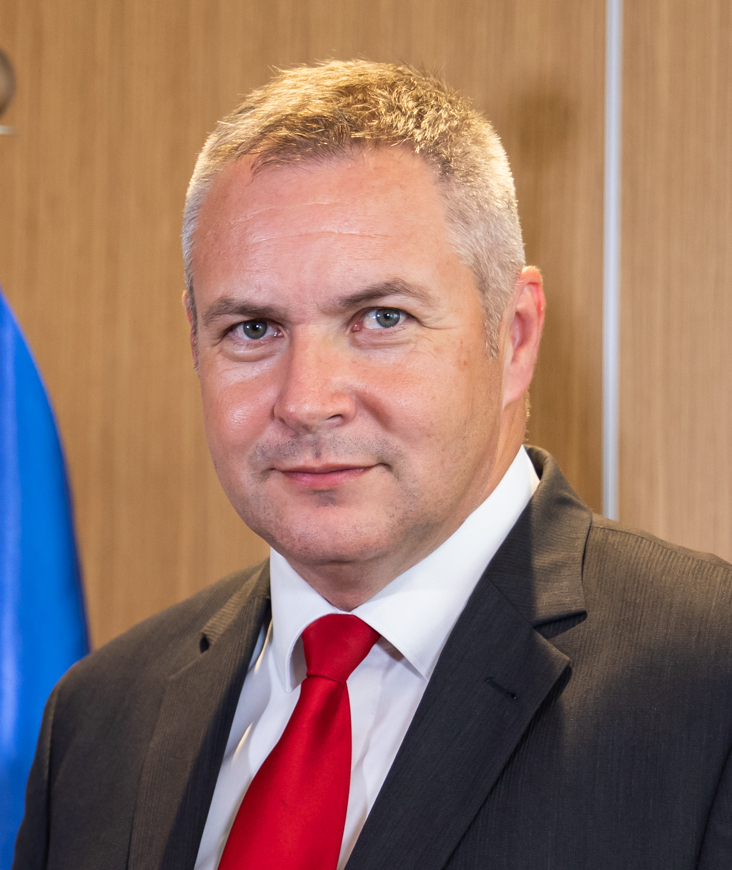
14th President
Dejan Židan
(2018-2020)
SD

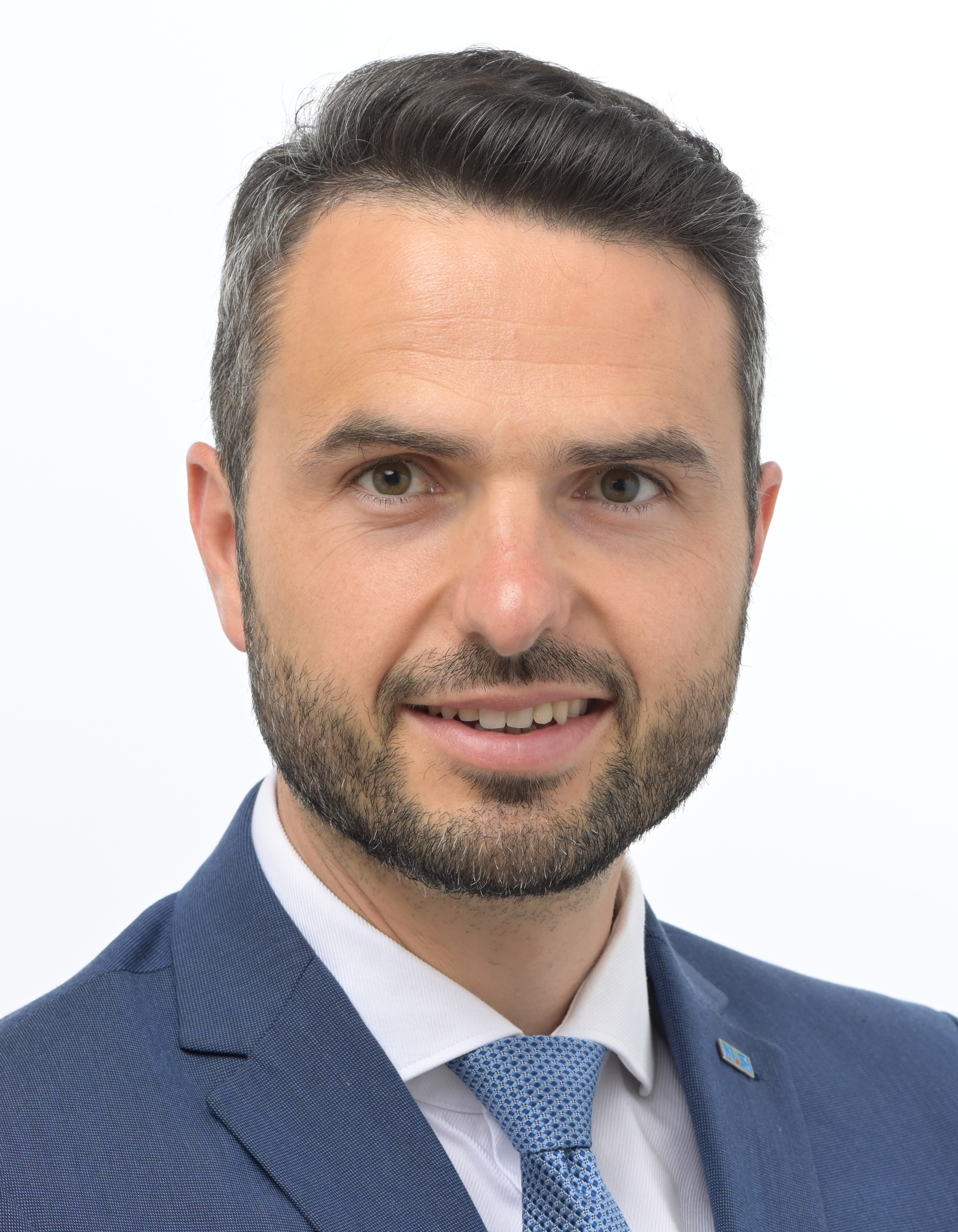
13th President
Matej Tonin
(2018)
NSi

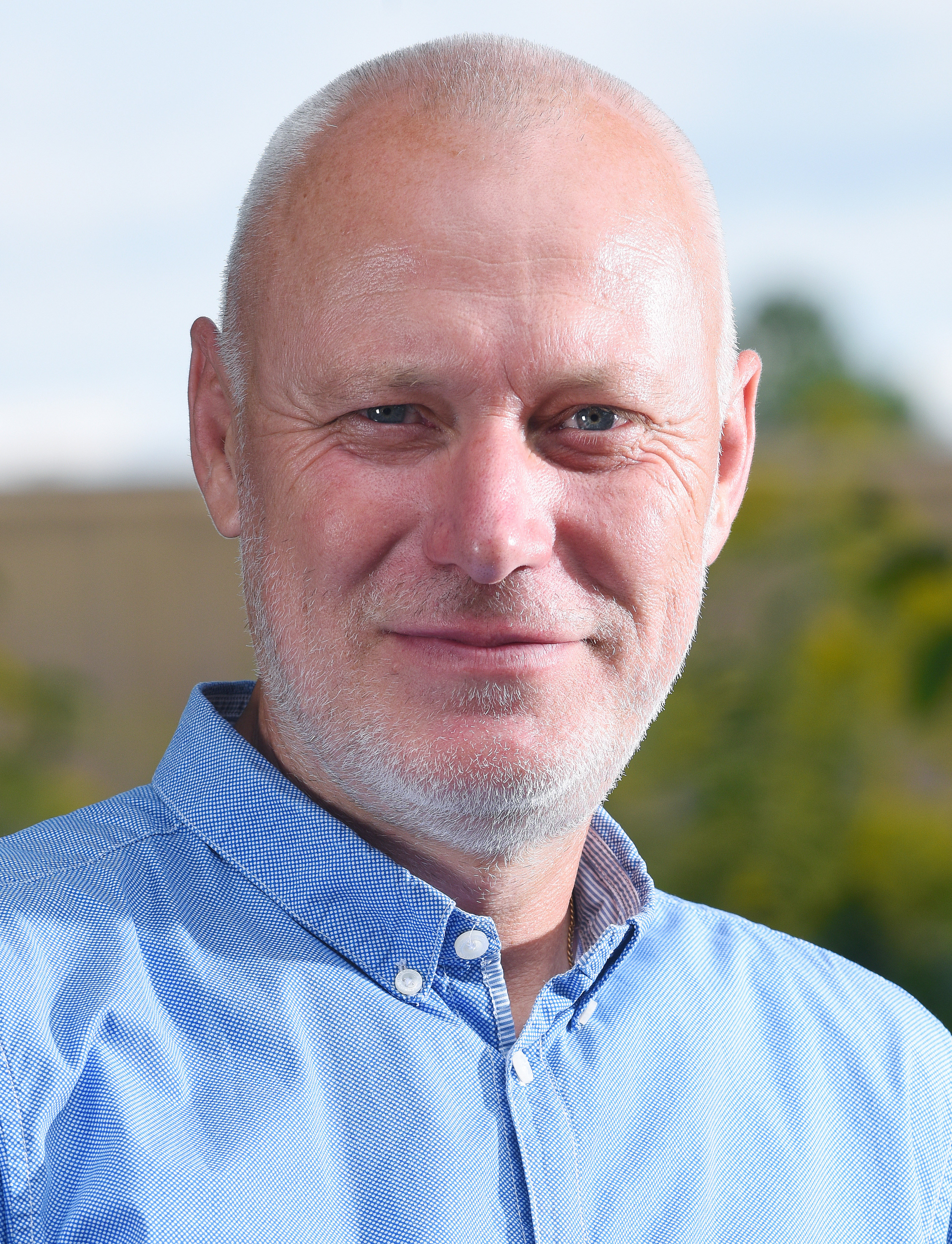
12th President
Milan Brglez
(2014-2018)
SMC

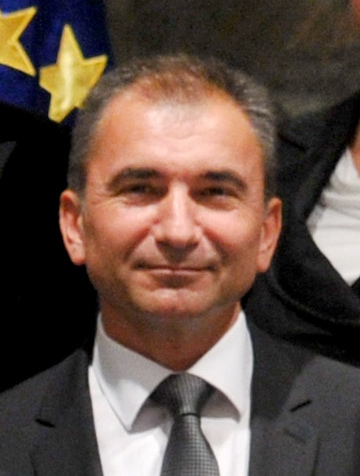
11th President
Janko Veber
(2013-2014)
SD

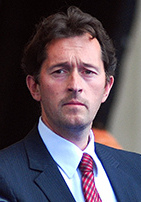
10th President
Gregor Virant
(2012-2013)
DLGV

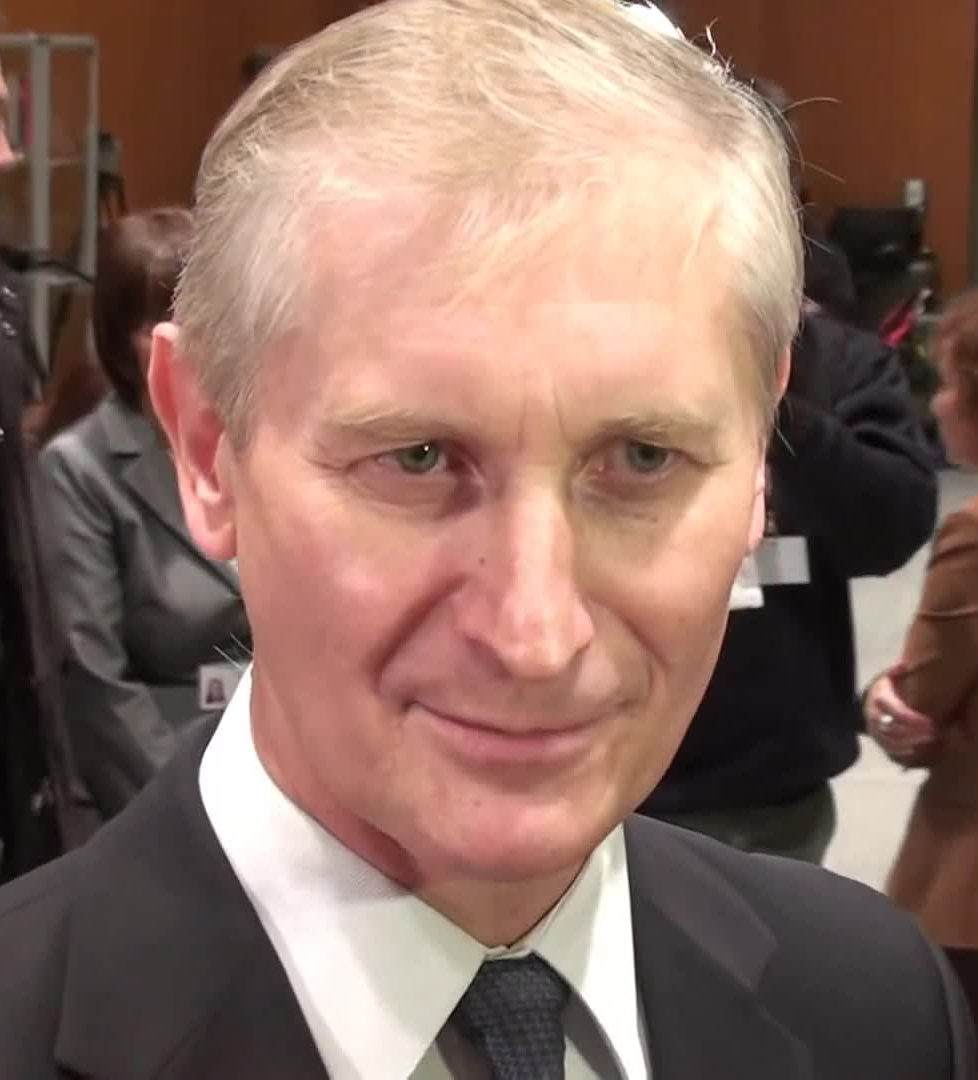
9th President
Ljubo Germič
(2011)
LDS

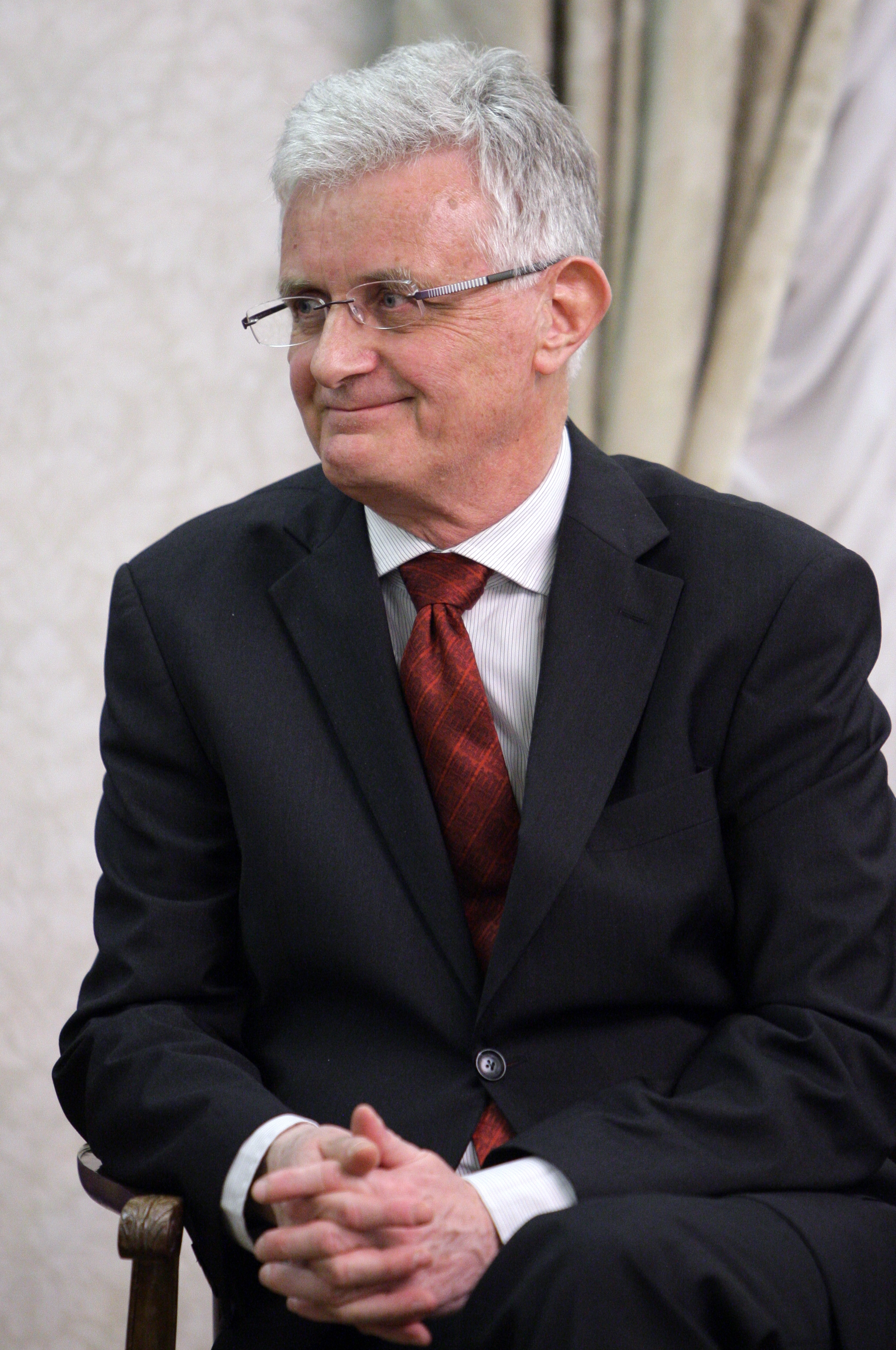
8th President
Pavel Gantar
(2008-2011)
Zares

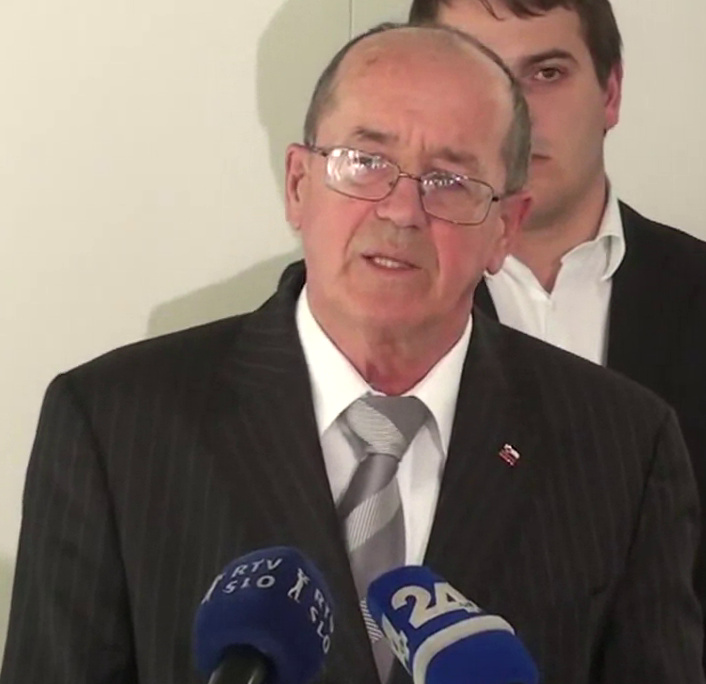
7th President
France Cukjati
(2004-2008)
SDS

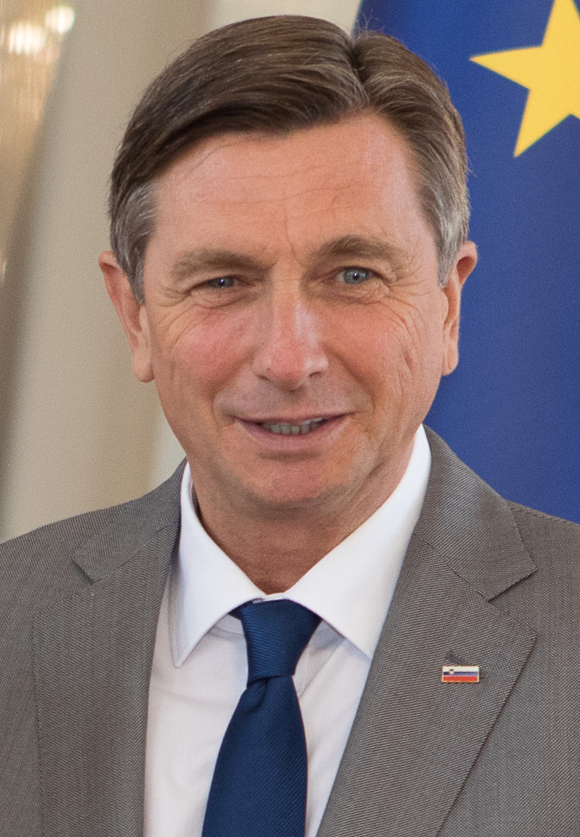
5th President
Borut Pahor
(2000-2004)
SD

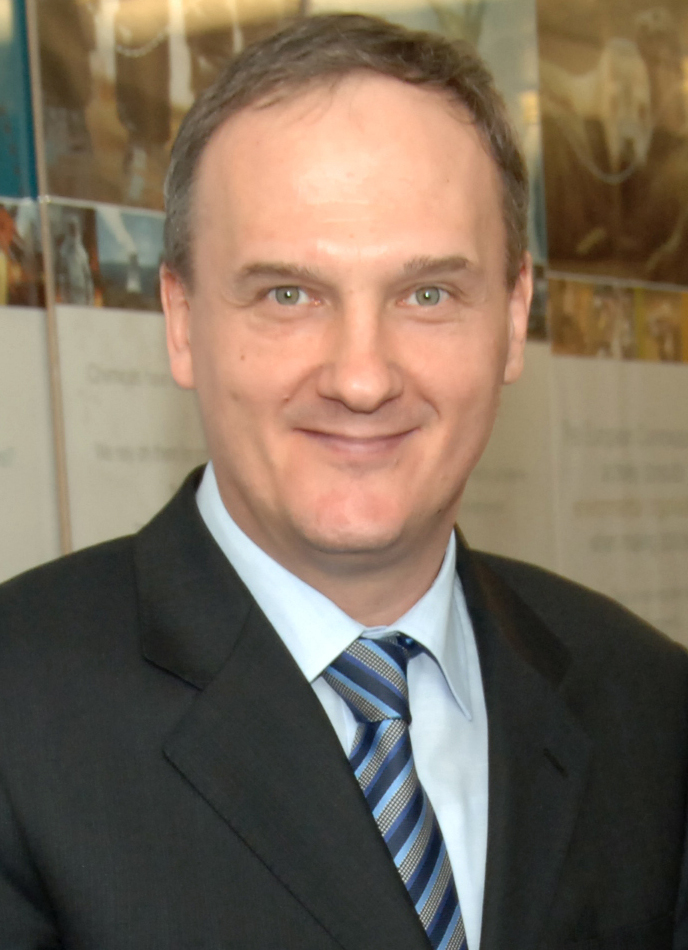
4th President
Janez Podobnik
(1996-2000)
SLS

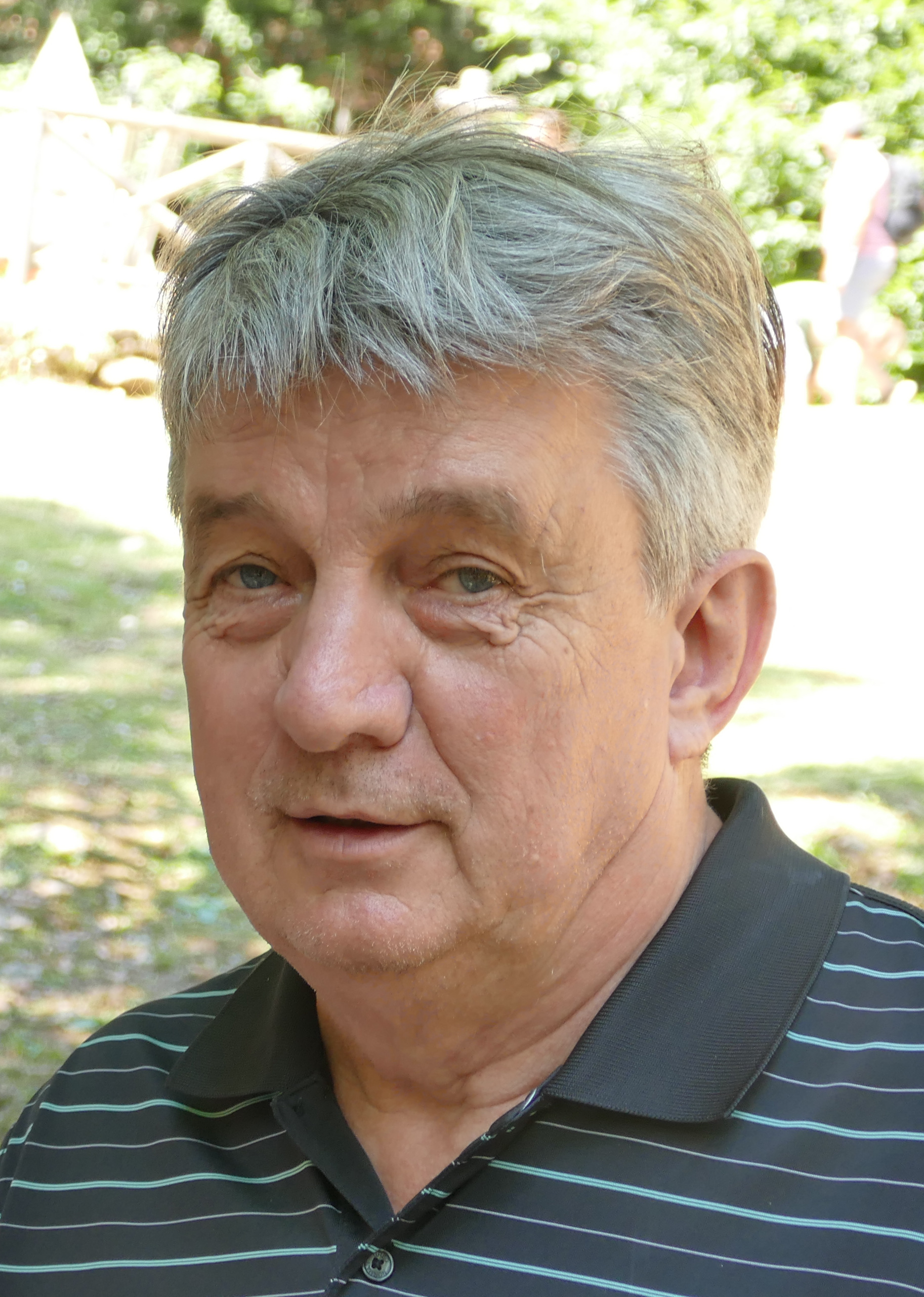
3rd President
Jožef Školč
(1994-1996)
LDS

== See also ==
- List of speakers of the National Assembly of Slovenia
