= President of the National Assembly =

President of the National Assembly may refer to:

Alphabetical by country

- President of the National Assembly of Armenia
- President of the National Assembly of Artsakh
- President of the National Assembly of Burkina Faso
- President of the National Assembly of Cambodia
- President of the National Assembly of Quebec, Canada
- President of the National Assembly of People's Power (Cuba)
- President of the National Assembly of Ecuador
- President of the National Assembly of France
- President of the National Assembly of Gabon
- President of the National Assembly of Guinea
- President of the National Assembly of Laos
- President of the National Assembly of Mauritania
- President of the National Assembly of Nicaragua
- President of the National Assembly of Niger
- President of the National Assembly of Panama
- President of the National Assembly of Senegal
- President of the National Assembly of Serbia
- President of the National Assembly of Slovenia
- President of the National Assembly of Thailand
- President of the National Assembly (Togo)
- President of the National Assembly of Venezuela

== See also ==
- Chairperson of the National Assembly (disambiguation)
- Speaker of the National Assembly (disambiguation)
