= Lucija Tacer Perlin =

Slovenian politician (born 1997)

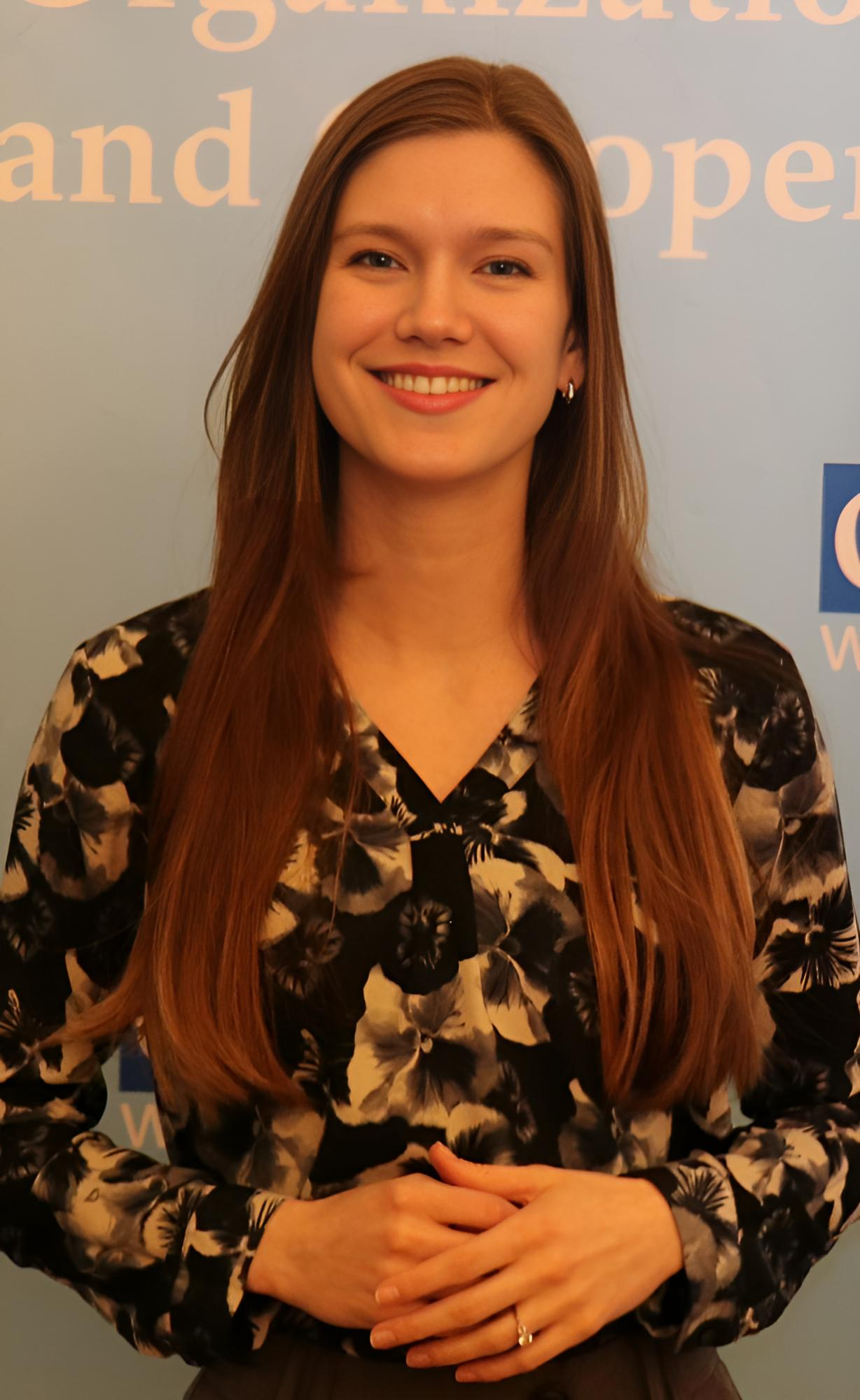
- Tacer Perlin in 2025

Member of the National Assembly
- Incumbent
- Assumed office 13 May 2022
- Constituency: Ljubljana Center/Šiška 3

Personal details
- Born: 11 February 1997 (age 29)
- Party: Freedom Movement (since 2022)

Lucija Tacer Perlin (born 11 February 1997) is a Slovenian politician serving as a member of the National Assembly since 2022. From 2020 to 2021, she served as youth delegate of Slovenia to the United Nations.
