= Speaker of the National Assembly =

Speaker of the National Assembly may refer to:

- Speaker of the National Assembly of Azerbaijan
- Speaker of the National Assembly of Botswana
- Speaker of the National Assembly of the Gambia
- Speaker of the National Assembly of Hungary
- Speaker of the National Assembly of Kenya
- Speaker of the National Assembly of Kuwait
- Speaker of the National Assembly of Mauritius
- Speaker of the National Assembly of Pakistan
- Speaker of the National Assembly of Saint Kitts and Nevis
- Speaker of the National Assembly (Slovenia)
- Speaker of the National Assembly of South Africa
- Speaker of the National Assembly (South Korea)
- Speaker of the National Assembly of Tanzania
- Speaker of the National Assembly of Zambia
- Speaker of the National Assembly of Zimbabwe

== See also ==
- Chairperson of the National Assembly (disambiguation)
- President of the National Assembly (disambiguation)
- Speaker (politics)
- National Assembly
