= Speaker of the National Assembly (Slovenia) =

Speaker of the National Assembly of the Republic of Slovenia
- Coat of Arms of the Republic of Slovenia

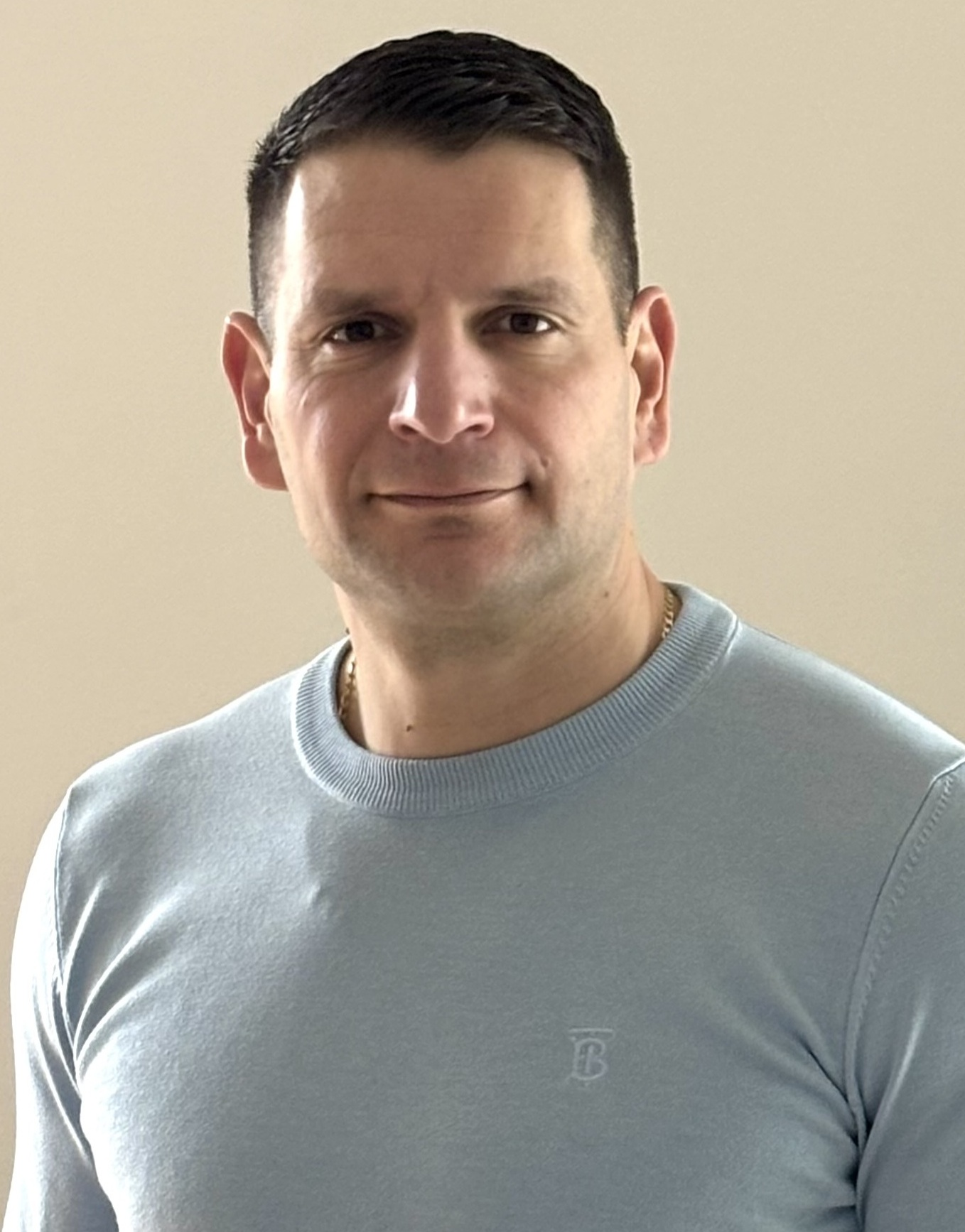
- Incumbent; Zoran Stevanović since April 10, 2026
- National Assembly of Slovenia
- Style: Mr./Madam Speaker (informal); Mr./Madam Speaker of the National Assembly (formal)
- Status: Presiding officer
- Seat: Building of the National Assembly of Slovenia, Ljubljana, Slovenia
- Nominator: 10 deputies
- Appointer: National Assembly of Slovenia
- Term length: At the Assembly pleasure; elected at the beginning of the new Assembly by an absolute majority of the deputies, and upon a vacancy.
- Constituting instrument: Constitution of the Republic of Slovenia, Article 84
- Formation: December 12, 1991; 34 years ago (Adoption of the Constitution)
- First holder: Herman Rigelnik
- Salary: €8,900.43 monthly
- Website: www.dz-rs.si

The Speaker of the National Assembly of the Republic of Slovenia (Slovene: Predsednik Državnega zbora Republike Slovenije) is the presiding officer of the National Assembly of the Republic of Slovenia. The office was established with the Constitution of the Republic of Slovenia in 1991. The first speaker, Herman Rigelnik, took office after the first election to the National Assembly in 1992.

The Constitution and the Rules of Procedure of the National Assembly do not explicitly provide that the speaker must be elected from among the deputies. Nevertheless, a constitutional custom has been established, and every speaker thus far has been elected from among the deputies.

The speaker of the National Assembly is the de facto deputy to the president of Slovenia because he or she temporarily performs the duties of the office in the event of a permanent inability, death, resignation, or other cessation of the president's term until a new president is elected.

The 17th and current speaker of the National Assembly (10th legislature) is Zoran Stevanović, the leader of Resni.ca.

== See also ==
- List of speakers of the National Assembly of Slovenia
