= Nataša Avšič Bogovič =

Slovenian politician (born 1971)

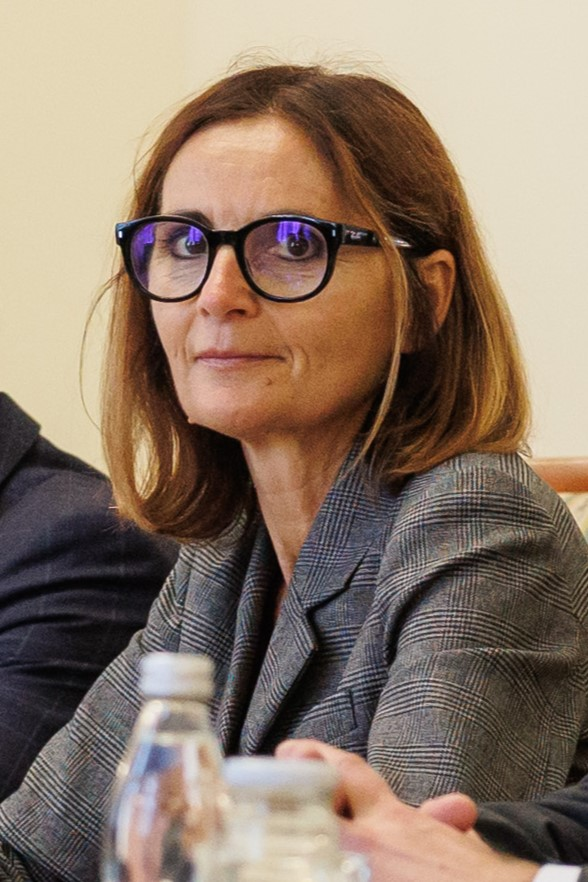
- Avšič Bogovič in 2025

Member of the National Assembly
- Incumbent
- Assumed office 13 May 2022
- Constituency: Novo Mesto – Brežice

Personal details
- Born: 12 September 1971 (age 54)
- Party: Freedom Movement (since 2022)

Nataša Avšič Bogovič (born 12 September 1971) is a Slovenian politician serving as a member of the National Assembly since 2022. She has served as group leader of the Freedom Movement since 2024.
