= Youth Delegates to the General Assembly of the United Nations =

Since 1981 the United Nations recommend Member States to include youth delegates in their diplomatic delegations. The United Nations have the purpose to strengthen youth participation, to extend the representation of young people and to give the youth a voice in the global decision-making process. For the United Nations participation in decision-making is one of the key priority areas. The youth delegate programme to the General Assembly of the United Nations is coordinated by the Focal Point on Youth at the global level. Nationally the governments around the globe form their own programme which is in every country a little bit different. For this reason the influence and possibilities of the youth delegates are many-faceted.
