= Janez Cigler Kralj =

Slovenian politician (born 1978)

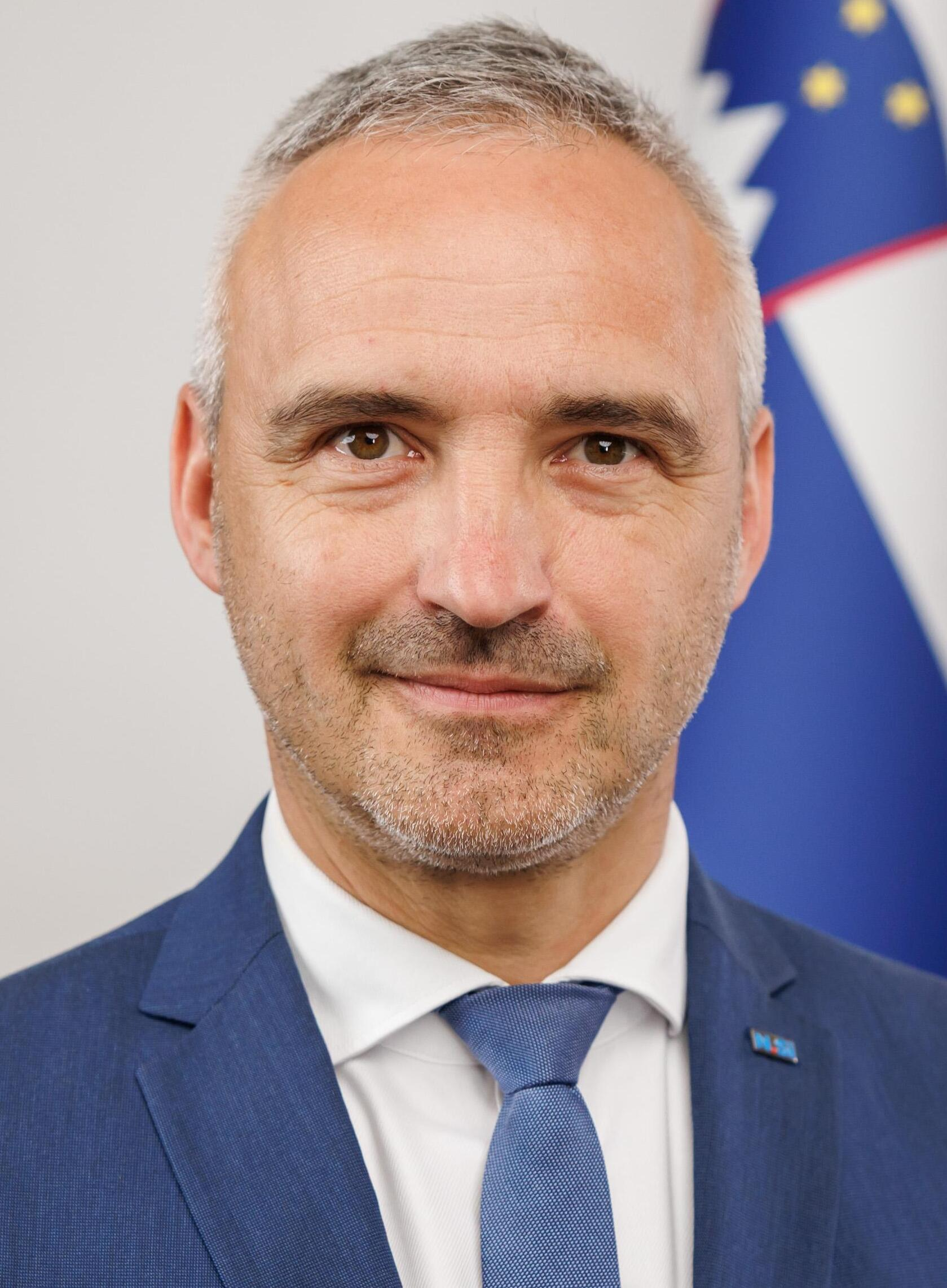
- Official portrait, 2026

Minister of Labour, Family, Social Affairs and Equal Opportunities
- In office 13 March 2020 – 1 June 2022
- Preceded by: Ksenija Klampfer
- Succeeded by: Luka Mesec

Personal details
- Born: 28 December 1978 (age 47)
- Party: New Slovenia

Janez Cigler Kralj (born 28 December 1978) is a Slovenian politician serving as a member of the National Assembly since 2022. From 2020 to 2022, he served as minister of labour, family, social affairs and equal opportunities.
