= Urška Klakočar Zupančič =

Speaker of the Slovenian National Assembly

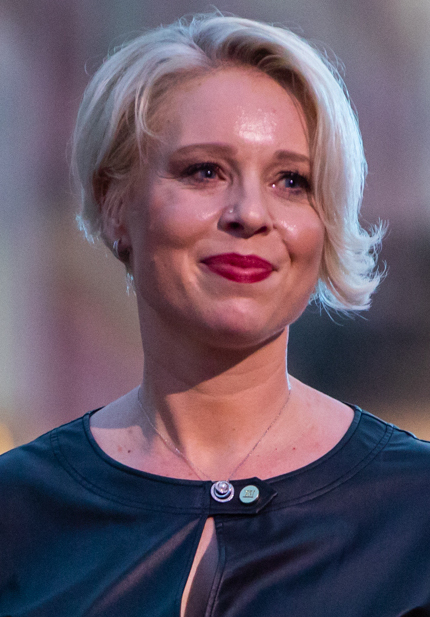
- Zupančič in 2022

Speaker of the National Assembly of Slovenia
- In office 13 May 2022 – 10 April 2026
- Preceded by: Igor Zorčič
- Succeeded by: Zoran Stevanović

Member of the National Assembly of Slovenia
- In office 13 May 2022 – 10 April 2026

Personal details
- Born: 19 June 1977 (age 49) Trbovlje, Yugoslavia (now Slovenia)
- Party: Independent (from 2026)
- Other political affiliations: Freedom Movement (until 2026)
- Education: University of Ljubljana

Urška Klakočar Zupančič (born 19 June 1977) is a Slovenian jurist and politician who was the speaker of the National Assembly and the assembly as a member of Freedom Movement from 2022 to April 2026.

== Early life and education ==
Urška Klakočar Zupančič was born in Trbovlje, Yugoslavia, on 19 June 1977. She attended Savo Kladnik Primary School in Sevnica from 1984 to 1992, and the Brežice Secondary School from 1992 to 1996. During her time in high school she lived in Glastonbury, England, and attended Millfield School from 1994 to 1995. She graduated from University of Ljubljana with a law degree after attending from 1996 to 2001, and passed the bar examination in 2005. She graduated with a master's degree in legal history in 2011, after writing about the division of inherited property in Babylon.

== Career ==
Zupančič interned at the headquarters of the United Nations in 2001. She worked in the office of the president of the Supreme Court of Slovenia as a judicial advisor after passing the bar exam.

Zupančič was a judicial trainee at the Ljubljana Higher Court from 2003 to 2004, and a senior judicial advisor at the Kranj District Court from 2005 to 2006. She has served as a judge in the District Court in Ljubljana since 2008.

In 2022, Zupančič joined Freedom Movement and became its vice president. In the 2022 election she was won a seat in the National Assembly. On 13 May 2022, she was elected to succeed Igor Zorčič as speaker of the assembly with the support of 55 members, becoming the first woman to hold the position. On 10 April 2026, she was succeeded by Zoran Stevanović.

In July 2026 it was announced that Zupančič and former prime minister Tone Rop would form a local list for the upcoming 2026 Ljubljana mayoral election, with the mayoral candidate between them still unclear.

== Personal life ==
Zupančič is the mother of two children. She can speak English, German, and Croatian, and knows some Italian. She published the novel Greta's Sin in April 2021.

== Political positions ==
During the COVID-19 pandemic Zupančič suggested that Slovenia follow the model used in Sweden.

== Works cited ==
=== News ===
- "Urška Klakočar Zupančič izvoljena za prvo predsednico DZ-ja: "Morda je to prvi znanilec sprememb"". Radiotelevizija Slovenija. 13 May 2022. Archived from the original on 26 June 2025.

=== Web ===
- "Mag. Urška Klakočar Zupančič". ONA VE. Archived from the original on 26 June 2025.
- "Urška Klakočar Zupančič". National Assembly. Archived from the original on 26 June 2025.

Preceded by Igor Zorčič	Speaker of the National Assembly of Slovenia; 2022 – 2026	Succeeded by Zoran Stevanović
Incumbent
