= Council of the President of the National Assembly of the Republic of Slovenia =

Advisory body to the Slovenian President

The Council of the President of the National Assembly is an advisory body to the President of the Assembly of Slovenia.

The Council consists of the speaker and deputy speaker of the National Assembly, leaders of political groups and deputies of national minorities.

Secretary General, Head of Legislative and Legal Service, presidents of working bodies, government representatives, professionals of the National Assembly and other participants can also join the meetings.

== Responsibilities ==
The council decides on:

- the proposal for the adoption of the bill by urgent procedure, unless the prime minister attaches question of confidence to the adoption of the law,
- the proposal for the consideration of the draft law in summary procedure,
- the proposal to hold a preliminary discussion of the law,
- the duration of the session of the National Assembly and during the discussion of individual items on the agenda and determining the duration of deputies or deputy groups and other meeting participants,
- the number of positions in the working body, which belongs to each parliamentary group, and which deputy group to preside over the working body,
- the composition of the National Assembly delegations in international parliamentary institutions and international organizations and international bodies,
- other matters.

The speaker of the National Assembly convenes a meeting of the council to consult the convening of meetings and proposals on the agenda of meetings of the National Assembly, on other matters related to the work of the National Assembly and its working bodies, the conditions for the formation of new political groups, on the conditions for the work of parliamentary groups and on other matters.

== Decision-Making ==
The meeting of the college shall have a quorum if it is attended by the heads of deputy groups whose members represent more than half of all deputies in the National Assembly. If also the re-convening quorum is not present and it is a matter of urgency, decisions within the competence of the college receives the speaker of the National Assembly.

In cases where the council decides, its decisions are adopted if the proposal is supported by the leaders of deputy groups whose members represent more than half of all deputies in the National Assembly.
