= Lenart Žavbi =

Slovenian politician (born 1999)

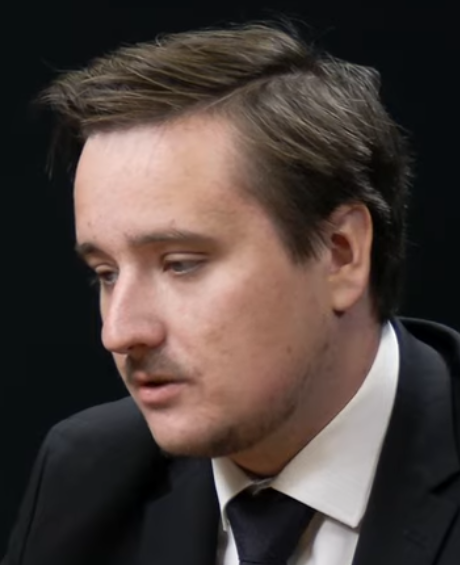
- Žavbi in 2025

Member of the National Assembly
- Incumbent
- Assumed office 13 May 2022
- Constituency: Ljubljana Center/Šiška 2

Personal details
- Born: 25 September 1999 (age 26)
- Party: Freedom Movement (since 2022)

Lenart Žavbi (born 25 September 1999) is a Slovenian politician serving as a member of the National Assembly since 2022. He was the youngest member of parliament elected in the 2022 parliamentary election.
