= Damjan Muzel =

Slovenian politician (born 1990)

Member of the National Assembly
- Incumbent
- Assumed office 22 March 2026
- Constituency: Celje – Celje I

Personal details
- Born: 24 May 1990 (age 35)
- Party: Slovenian Democratic Party

Damjan Muzel (born 24 May 1990) is a Slovenian politician who was elected member of the National Assembly in 2026. From 2022 to 2026, he served as deputy mayor of Vojnik.
