= Zoran Stevanović (politician) =

Slovenian politician

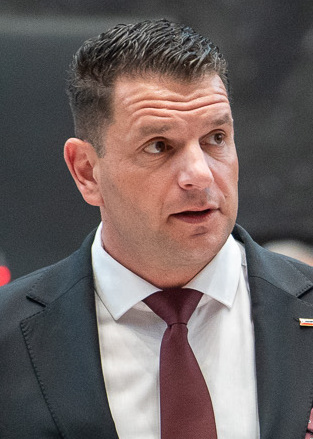

Speaker of the National Assembly of Slovenia
- Incumbent
- Assumed office 10 April 2026
- Preceded by: Urška Klakočar Zupančič

Leader of Resni.ca
- Incumbent
- Assumed office 14 January 2021
- Preceded by: Party established

Member of the National Assembly of Slovenia
- Incumbent
- Assumed office 10 April 2026
- Constituency: Kranj II

Member of the Kranj City Council
- In office 18 November 2018 – 20 November 2022

Personal details
- Born: 23 February 1982 (age 44) Jesenice, Slovenia
- Party: Resni.ca (since 2021)
- Other political affiliations: SNS (until 2018); Independent (2018–2021)
- Children: 3
- Education: University of Primorska

Zoran Stevanović (born 23 February 1982) is a Slovenian politician who has served as President of the National Assembly since April 2026. He is the founder and president of the political party Resni.ca, established in 2021.

== Early life and education ==
Stevanović was born in Jesenice on 23 February 1982 to a Bosnian Serb father, Rajko, and a Slovenian mother. He completed Secondary Police School in Tacen and joined the Slovenian police force in 2000.

In 2014, he obtained a master’s degree from the University of Primorska, Faculty of Management. He later enrolled in doctoral studies at the University of Ljubljana, Faculty of Arts, but did not complete his dissertation.

== Early career ==
Stevanović worked as a police officer beginning in 2000. In November 2001, an incident involving drinking and the use of service weapons during working hours occurred within the police unit where he worked. His involvement is unclear, but he was subsequently transferred to the Radovljica police station. He claims the transfer was a “reward,” although such a type of transfer does not formally exist in the police.

In 2005, after a traffic accident, Stevanović attempted insurance fraud and was legally convicted. Prior to this, he had already been convicted once for endangering safety. Despite this, he claims it was not fraud and that he has never been convicted.

Several controversial actions were attributed to him during his police career. In 2011, he was dismissed for cause. The reason was inappropriate and insulting behavior toward a superior; earlier, he had also performed his duties under the influence of alcohol. A labor court later ruled that the dismissal was unlawful, as he claimed his intoxication was due to “rum balls.” Stevanović, however, states that he left the police voluntarily and that the dismissal was only a warning.

After leaving the police force, he worked briefly at Hypo Leasing and later co-founded a private security company, Feniks VS. The company ceased operations after several years and lost its security licence following regulatory findings of irregularities.

Since 2019, he has worked as a self-employed entrepreneur in the construction of adventure parks. In November 2025, he became president of the Water Polo Federation of Slovenia.

== Political career ==
=== Early political activity ===
He first ran for mayor of the Municipality of Kranj in 2014 but did not achieve notable success. He ran again in 2018 and, with his list “Zoran za Kranj,” won seats in the municipal council. He reached the second round but was defeated by Matjaž Rakovec. In 2022, he ran again for mayor of Kranj, finishing third and failing to reach the second round.

He was a member of the Slovenian National Party led by Zmago Jelinčič. After the 2018 parliamentary elections, he fell out with Jelinčič and left the party.

=== Resni.ca ===
On 14 January 2021, he founded the party Resni.ca and became its president.

==== COVID-19 protests ====
In September 2021, he organized protests against COVID-19 measures adopted by the government of Janez Janša. The first protest gathered around 8,000 people in Ljubljana. Subsequent protests escalated, including clashes with police, who used a water cannon and tear gas. On 5 October, Stevanović was detained by police. Protests continued in the following weeks, spreading to other parts of Slovenia, and demanding the resignation of the government and the abolition of all COVID-19 measures.

He was later invited by President Borut Pahor for talks and a call for nonviolence.

==== National and European elections ====
Resni.ca ran in the 2022 parliamentary election with 85 candidates but finished 8th and did not enter parliament.

He led his party’s list in the 2024 European Parliament election, but failed to win a seat. He received 14,603 preferential votes, placing 9th among candidates.

In the 2026 parliamentary election, he was elected as a Member of Parliament. His party received 5.49% of the vote and won 5 seats. Following the election, Stevanović was elected President of the National Assembly on 10 April 2026.

== Political positions ==
Stevanović is generally described as holding sovereigntist and anti-establishment positions. He has been critical of certain European Union policies and has advocated for a referendum on NATO membership. Regarding the Russo-Ukrainian war, Stevanović has been described as a supporter of Russia and Vladimir Putin, which he denies.

He has publicly expressed support for Serbian President Aleksandar Vučić, and has opposed Kosovo's recognition as an independent state, arguing that it lacks a basis in international law.

He has also expressed support for Bosnian Serb leader Milorad Dodik, particularly in relation to international sanctions and travel restrictions imposed on him.

Domestically, he has advocated for recognition of ethnic Serbs in Slovenia as a national minority.

== Personal life ==
Stevanović is a sports enthusiast who enjoys running and hiking. He is married and has three sons.
