= 8th National Assembly of Slovenia =

Legislative term of the National Assembly of Slovenia 2018–2022

8th National Assembly: 8. državni zbor

Type
- Type: Lower house of the Slovenian Parliament

History
- Founded: 22 June 2018
- Disbanded: 13 May 2022
- Preceded by: 7th National Assembly
- Succeeded by: 9th National Assembly

Leadership
- Speaker: Igor Zorčič (NP) since 5 March 2020
- Deputy Speakers: Tina Heferle (LMŠ); Since 23 August 2018; Jože Tanko (SDS); Since 23 August 2018; Branko Simonovič (DeSUS); Since 29 August 2018

Structure
- Seats: 90 – Members
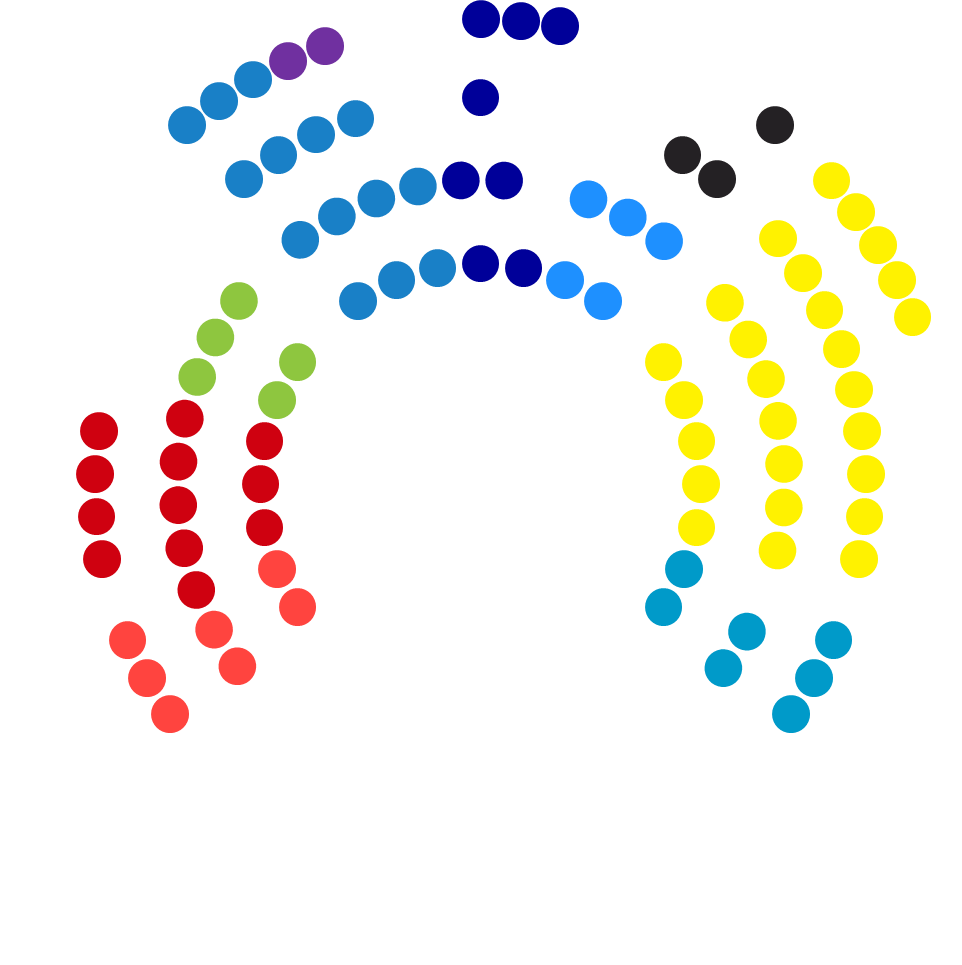
- Political groups: Government (37): SDS (26); NSi (7); Concretely (4); Confidence and supply (10): DeSUS (4); SNS (3); Italian and Hungarian national minorities (2) (Note: Usually supports the Government); Independent (1); ND (1); Opposition (43): LMŠ (14); SD (13); Left (7); SAB (6); Independent (3); Freedom Movement (2); LIDE (1); Government (43): LMŠ (13); SD (10); SMC (10); SAB (5); DeSUS (5); Confidence and supply (11): Left (9); Italian and Hungarian national minorities (2) (Note: Usually supports the Government); Opposition (36): SDS (25); NSi (7); SNS (4)

Elections
- Voting system: Proportional representation
- Last election: 3 June 2018

Meeting place
- Great Hall of the National Assembly
- Building of the National Assembly, Ljubljana

Website
- www.dz-rs.si

The 8th National Assembly of the Republic of Slovenia was elected in the 3 June 2018 Slovenian parliamentary elections. At the order of President Borut Pahor, it first convened on 22 June 2018. The assembly was in session during the outgoing 12th Government of Prime Minister Miro Cerar and elected the 13th and 14th governments. It was the fourth consecutive time in which centre-left and left-wing parties had a majority.

== Major events ==
- June 22, 2018: 1st session (convened by President Borut Pahor)
  - Matej Tonin (NSi) was elected Speaker with 80 out of 90 votes.
- August 17, 2018: Election of Prime Minister Marjan Šarec (LMŠ)
- August 23, 2018: Election of Speaker Dejan Židan (SD) and Deputy-Speaker Tina Heferle (LMŠ) and Jože Tanko (SDS)
- September 13, 2018: Election of 13th Government of the Republic of Slovenia
- January 27, 2020: Prime Minister Marjan Šarec resigned.
- March 3, 2020: Election of Prime Minister Janez Janša (SDS) and resignation of Speaker Dejan Židan (SD)
- March 5, 2020: Election of Speaker Igor Zorčič (then SMC)
- March 13, 2020: Election of 14th Government of the Republic of Slovenia

== Major legislation ==
Law	Official title	Slovene title	Adopted	In force	Effective	Content	Proposer
"Anti-Corona" Act (No. 1)	Intervention Measures Act to Curb the COVID-19 Epidemic and Mitigate Its Impact on Citizens and the Economy	Zakon o interventnih ukrepih za zajezitev epidemije COVID-19 in omilitev njenih posledic za državljane in gospodarstvo	2 April 2020	10 April 2020	1 April 2020*	€3 billion worth of socio-economic measures to minimize consequences of the 2020 coronavirus epidemic	14th Government

* retroactive law

== Political parties ==
Party (European Affiliation)		Ideology	Leader	Seats	
Party (European Affiliation)		Ideology	Leader	2018 Elections	Currently
SDS (EPP)	Slovenian Democratic Party; Slovenska demokratska stranka	Right-wing (formerly Centre-Right, and before Centre-Left) - Right-wing populism Slovenian nationalism National conservatism Liberal conservatism Anti-immigration	Janez Janša; Prime Minister	25 / 90	26 / 90
LMŠ (ALDE)	List of Marjan Šarec; Lista Marjana Šarca	Centre-Left - Social liberalism Populism	Marjan Šarec; MP, Former Prime Minister	13 / 90	14 / 90
SD (S&D)	Social Democrats; Socialni demokrati	Centre -Left - Social Democracy; Left-wing populism	Tanja Fajon; MEP	10 / 90	13 / 90
Concretely (ALDE)	Concretely; Konkretno (formerly Stranka modernega centra)	Centre to Centre-Left - Liberalism; Social liberalism	Zdravko Počivalšek; Minister of Economic Development and Technology	10 / 90	4 / 90
Levica (GUE/NGL)	The Left; Levica	Far-left - Democratic socialism Left-wing populism Anti-capitalism	Luka Mesec; MP	9 / 90	7 / 90
NSi (EPP)	New Slovenia – Christian Democrats; Nova Slovenija – Krščanski demokrati	Centre-Right - Christian democracy Liberal conservatism Social conservatism	Matej Tonin; Minister of Defence	7 / 90	7 / 90
SAB (ALDE)	Party of Alenka Bratušek; Stranka Alenke Bratušek	Centre-Left - Social liberalism	Alenka Bratušek; Former Prime Minister	5 / 90	6 / 90
DeSUS (EDP)	Democratic Party of Pensioners of Slovenia; Demokratična stranka upokojencev Slovenije	Centre-Left - Social liberalism Single-issue politics Populism	Ljubo Jasnič; Former party secretary general	5 / 90	4 / 90
SNS (ENF)	Slovenian National Party; Slovenska nacionalna stranka	Far-Right - Nationalism; Anti-immigration; Populism; Euroscepticism	Zmago Jelinčič Plemeniti; MP	4 / 90	3 / 90

== Leadership ==
=== National Assembly leadership ===
Speaker

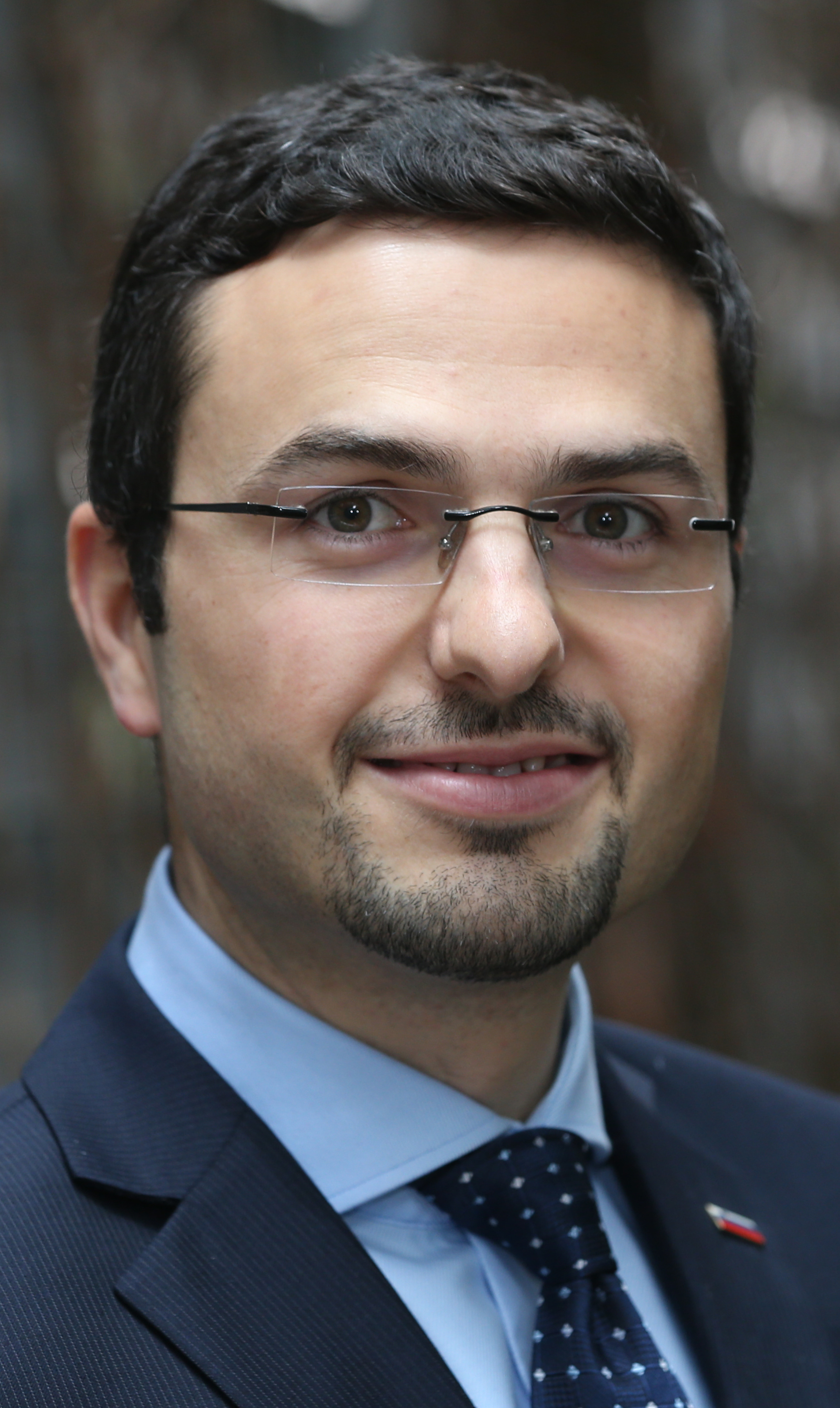
Former
Matej Tonin (NSi)
2018

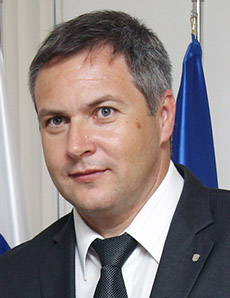
Former
Dejan Židan (SD)
2018-2020

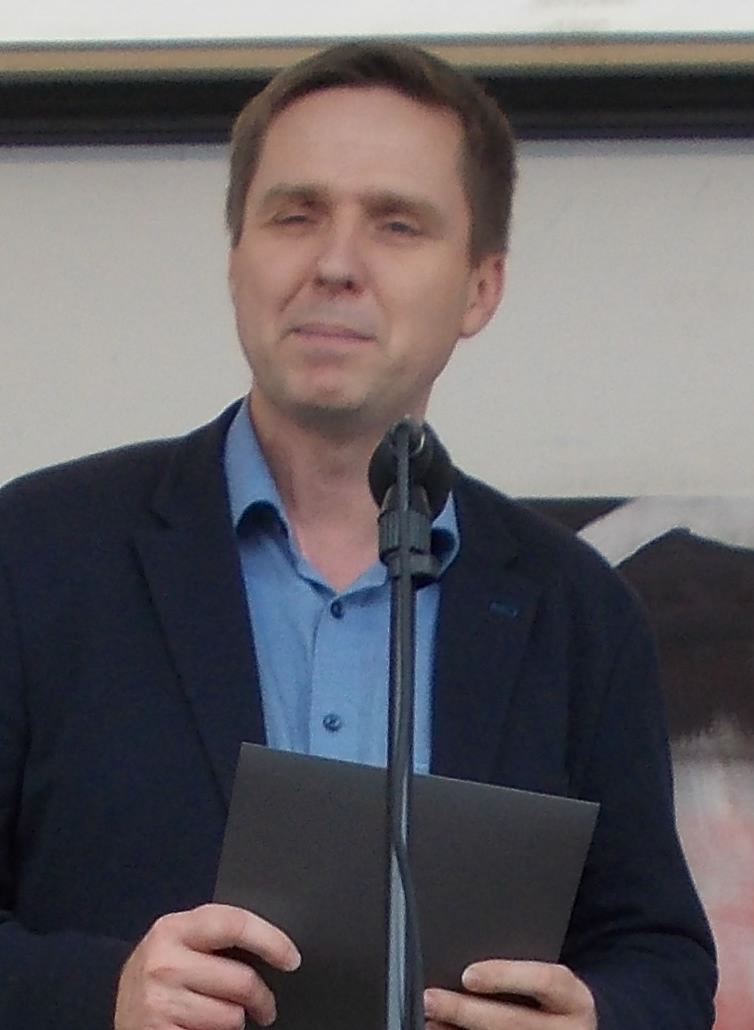
Last
Igor Zorčič (NP)
2020-2022

Position	MP
Speaker	Matej Tonin (NSi), June 22, 2018 – August 23, 2018
Speaker	Tina Heferle (LMŠ), Acting August 23, 2018
Speaker	Dejan Židan (SD), August 23, 2018 – March 3, 2020
Speaker	Branko Simonovič (DeSUS), Acting March 3 – 5, 2020
Speaker	Igor Zorčič (NP), March 5, 2020 – May 13, 2022
Deputy Speakers	Jože Tanko (SDS), August 23, 2018 – May 13, 2022
Deputy Speakers	Branko Simonovič (DeSUS), August 29, 2018 – May 13, 2022
Deputy Speakers	Tina Heferle (LMŠ), August 23, 2018 – May 13, 2022

=== Leaders of the political groups ===
Group		Leader	Deputy Leader(s) (Note: Groups that have more than 20 members can have 2 Deputy Leaders.)	Secretary
PS SDS	Group of Slovenian Democratic Party; Poslanska skupina Slovenske demokratske stranke	Danijel Krivec	Alenka Jeraj; Tomaž Lisec	Maja Prezelj
PS LMŠ	Group of List of Marjan Šarec; Poslanska skupina Liste Marjana Šarca	Brane Golubović	Jerca Korče	Bojana Bavec
PS SD	Group of Social Democrats; Poslanska skupina Socialnih demokratov	Matjaž Han	Bojana Muršič	Miroslav Pretnar
PS Konkretno	Group of Concretely; Poslanska skupina Konkretno (formerly Poslanska skupina Stranke modernega centra)	Gregor Perič	Mojca Žnidarič	Iztok Artič
PS Levica	Group of The Left; Poslanska skupina Levice	Matej Tašner Vatovec	Nataša Sukič	Matej Kolenc
PS NSi	Group of New Slovenia – Christian Democrats; Poslanska skupina Nove Slovenije – Krščanskih demokratov	Jožef Horvat	Aleksander Reberšek	Terezija Trupi
PS SAB	Group of Party of Alenka Bratušek; Poslanska skupina Stranke Alenke Bratušek	Maša Kociper	Andrej Rajh	Jernej Pavlič
PS DeSUS	Group of Democratic Party of Pensioners of Slovenia; Poslanska skupina Demokratične stranke upokojencev Slovenije	Franc Jurša	Ivan Hršak	Ksenija Vencelj
PS SNS	Group of Slovenian National Party; Poslanska skupina Slovenske nacionalne stranke	Zmago Jelinčič Plemeniti	Dušan Šiško	Rok Dolenc
PS IMNS	Group of Italian in Hungarian National Minority; Poslanska skupina italijanske in madžarske narodne skupnosti	Felice Žiža	Ferenc Horváth	Petra Jamnik
PS NP	Group of Independent Members; Poslanska skupina nepovezanih poslancev	Janja Sluga	Jurij Lep	Ivana Grgić
Nep - MU	Independent Member; Nepovezana poslanka	Mateja Udovč		

== Members ==
Constituency	Electoral districts										
Constituency	1	2	3	4	5	6	7	8	9	10	11
1 Kranj	Jesenice	Radovljica I	Radovljica II	Kranj I	Kranj II	Kranj III	Tržič	Škofja Loka I	Škofja Loka II	Kamnik	Idrija
1 Kranj	/	Franc Kramar (SAB)	/	/	Mateja Udovč (SMC)	Branko Grims (SDS)	Edvard Paulič (LMŠ)	Marko Pogačnik (SDS)	Mihael Prevc (NSi)	Marjan Šarec (LMŠ)	Samo Bevk (SD)
1 Kranj	/	Franc Kramar (SAB)	/	/	Mateja Udovč (SMC)	Igor Peček (LMŠ)	Jure Ferjan (SDS)	Miha Kordiš (Levica)	Mihael Prevc (NSi)	Marjan Šarec (LMŠ)	Samo Bevk (SD)
2 Postojna	Tolmin	Piran	Izola	Koper I	Koper II	Sežana	Ilirska Bistrica	Postojna	Nova Gorica I	Nova Gorica II	Ajdovščina
2 Postojna	Danijel Krivec (SDS)	Meira Hot (SD)	Branko Simonovič (DeSUS)	Matej Tašner Vatovec (Levica)	/	Marko Bandelli (SAB)	Andrej Černigoj (NSi)	Robert Pavšič (LMŠ)	Elena Zavadlav Ušaj (SDS)	Matjaž Nemec (SD)	Eva Irgl (SDS)
2 Postojna	Danijel Krivec (SDS)	Meira Hot (SD)	Gregor Perič (SMC)	Matej Tašner Vatovec (Levica)	/	Marko Bandelli (SAB)	Andrej Černigoj (NSi)	Robert Pavšič (LMŠ)	Elena Zavadlav Ušaj (SDS)	Matjaž Nemec (SD)	Eva Irgl (SDS)
3 Ljubljana Center	Logatec	Vrhnika	Ljubljana Vič-Rudnik I	Ljubljana Vič-Rudnik II	Ljubljana Vič-Rudnik III	Ljubljana Vič-Rudnik IV	Ljubljana Center	Ljubljana Šiška I	Ljubljana Šiška II	Ljubljana Šiška III	Ljubljana Šiška IV
3 Ljubljana Center	Iva Dimic (NSi)	Jerca Korče (LMŠ)	Alenka Jeraj (SDS)	Monika Gregorčič (SMC)	/	/	Violeta Tomić (Levica)	/	Marko Koprivc (SD)	/	Andreja Zabret (LMŠ)
3 Ljubljana Center	Iva Dimic (NSi)	Jerca Korče (LMŠ)	Alenka Jeraj (SDS)	Monika Gregorčič (SMC)	/	/	Violeta Tomić (Levica)	/	Maša Kociper (SAB)	/	Andreja Zabret (LMŠ)
3 Ljubljana Center	Iva Dimic (NSi)	Daniel Cukjati (SDS)	Alenka Jeraj (SDS)	Monika Gregorčič (SMC)	/	/	Violeta Tomić (Levica)	/	Maša Kociper (SAB)	/	Leon Merjasec (SDS)
3 Ljubljana Center	Iva Dimic (NSi)	Daniel Cukjati (SDS)	Alenka Jeraj (SDS)	Monika Gregorčič (SMC)	/	/	Violeta Tomić (Levica)	/	Jani Möderndorfer (LMŠ)	/	Leon Merjasec (SDS)
4 Ljubljana Bežigrad	Kočevje	Ribnica	Grosuplje	Litija	Ljubljana Moste-Polje I	Ljubljana Moste-Polje II	Ljubljana Moste-Polje III	Ljubljana Bežigrad I	Ljubljana Bežigrad II	Domžale I	Domžale II
4 Ljubljana Bežigrad	Predrag Baković (SD)	Jože Tanko (SDS)	/	Boris Doblekar (SDS)	Janez Moškrič (SDS)	/	Vojko Starović (SAB)	Dušan Verbič (SMC)	Luka Mesec (Levica)	Tina Heferle (LMŠ)	Brane Golubović (LMŠ)
4 Ljubljana Bežigrad	Predrag Baković (SD)	Jože Tanko (SDS)	/	Boris Doblekar (SDS)	Janez Moškrič (SDS)	/	Nataša Sukič (Levica)	Dušan Verbič (SMC)	Luka Mesec (Levica)	Tina Heferle (LMŠ)	Tadeja Šuštar (NSi)
5 Celje	Šentjur pri Celju	Celje I	Celje II	Žalec I	Žalec II	Mozirje	Velenje I	Velenje II	Slovenj Gradec	Ravne na Koroškem	Radlje ob Dravi
5 Celje	Lidija Ivanuša (SDS)	/	Željko Cigler (Levica)	Ljubo Žnidar (SDS)	Aleksander Reberšek (NSi)	Nada Brinovšek (SDS)	/	Franc Rosec (SDS)	Jože Lenart (LMŠ)	Jani Prednik (SD)	/
5 Celje	Robert Polnar (DeSUS)	/	Janja Sluga (TBD)	Ljubo Žnidar (SDS)	Nik Prebil (LMŠ)	Nada Brinovšek (SDS)	/	Franc Rosec (SDS)	Jože Lenart (LMŠ)	Jani Prednik (SD)	/
6 Novo Mesto	Črnomelj	Novo Mesto I	Novo Mesto II	Trebnje	Brežice	Krško	Sevnica	Laško	Hrastnik	Trbovlje	Zagorje ob Savi
6 Novo Mesto	/	Anja Bah Žibert (SDS)	/	Franci Kepa (SDS)	Igor Zorčič (NP)	Dušan Šiško (SNS)	Tomaž Lisec (SDS)	Matjaž Han (SD)	Ivan Hršak (DeSUS)	Primož Siter (Levica)	Rudi Medved (LMŠ)
6 Novo Mesto	/	Anja Bah Žibert (SDS)	/	Blaž Pavlin (NSi)	Igor Zorčič (NP)	Dušan Šiško (SNS)	Tomaž Lisec (SDS)	Matjaž Han (SD)	Soniboj Knežak (SD)	Primož Siter (Levica)	Rudi Medved (LMŠ)
7 Maribor	Šmarje pri Jelšah	Slovenska Bistrica	Slovenske Konjice	Ruše	Maribor I	Maribor II	Maribor III	Maribor IV	Maribor V	Maribor VI	Maribor VII
7 Maribor	/	Karmen Furman (SDS)	Bojan Podkrajšek (SDS)	Jurij Lep (TBD)	/	/	Dejan Kaloh (SDS)	Franc Trček (SD)	/	Branislav Rajić (TBD)	Lidija Divjak Mirnik (LMŠ)
7 Maribor	/	Karmen Furman (SDS)	Zmago Jelinčič (SNS)	Bojana Muršič (SD)	/	/	Dejan Kaloh (SDS)	Gregor Židan (SD)	/	Andrej Rajh (SAB)	Lidija Divjak Mirnik (LMŠ)
8 Ptuj	Lendava	Ormož	Ljutomer	Murska Sobota I	Murska Sobota II	Gornja Radgona	Lenart	Pesnica	Ptuj I	Ptuj II	Ptuj III
8 Ptuj	Jožef Horvat (NSi)	Aljaž Kovačič (LMŠ)	Franc Jurša (DeSUS)	/	Dejan Židan (SD)	/	/	Marijan Pojbič (SDS)	Jožef Lenart (SDS)	Boštjan Koražija (Levica)	Suzana Lep Šimenko (SDS)
8 Ptuj	Jožef Horvat (NSi)	Jani Ivanuša (SNS)	Franc Jurša (DeSUS)	/	Dejan Židan (SD)	/	/	Marijan Pojbič (SDS)	Jožef Lenart (SDS)	Boštjan Koražija (Levica)	Suzana Lep Šimenko (SDS)
8 Ptuj	Jožef Horvat (NSi)	Jani Ivanuša (SNS)	Franc Jurša (DeSUS)	/	Dejan Židan (SD)	/	/	Marijan Pojbič (SDS)	Jožef Lenart (SDS)	Nuša Ferenčič (SDS)	Suzana Lep Šimenko (SDS)
8 Ptuj	Jožef Horvat (NSi)	Mojca Žnidarič (SMC)	Franc Jurša (DeSUS)	/	Dejan Židan (SD)	/	/	Marijan Pojbič (SDS)	Jožef Lenart (SDS)	Nuša Ferenčič (SDS)	Suzana Lep Šimenko (SDS)

=== Demographics ===
Proportion of women elected to the National Assembly
2018 elections	24.4%
2014 elections	35.6%
2011 elections	35.6%
2008 elections	15.6%
2004 elections	12.2%
2000 elections	15.6%
1996 elections	12.2%
1992 elections	14.4%

8th National Assembly has 22 female MPs which equals 24,4 %, and is a little bit less than in the 7th Assembly. Youngest MP is Jerca Korče (LMŠ) who is 28 years old. Oldest MP is Jožef Česnik (SAB), who is 73 years old and also presided over the first session.

== Changes in membership ==
=== Changes of MPs ===
Changes are expected when government will be formed, MP who is named Prime Minister, Minister, State Secretary or Secretary-General of the government, cannot be MP anymore and is replaced with an MP that would be elected, if they were not elected. Peter Jožef Česnik and Miro Cerar, ministers of the 13th Government, resigned as MPs and will not take their seats after new government will be elected.

Vacated by				Reason for change	Successor				
Constituency	District	Name	Party	Reason for change	Constituency	District	Name	Party	Date of installation
Kranj	Kamnik	Marjan Šarec	LMŠ	Elected Prime Minister	Kranj	Radovljica II	Karla Urh	LMŠ	23 August 2018
Ljubljana Center	Ljubljana Vič-Rudnik III	Miro Cerar	SMC	Elected Minister	Ljubljana Center	Ljubljana Šiška II	Jani Möderndorfer	SMC	28 September 2018
Postojna	Sežana	Marko Bandelli	SAB	Elected Minister	Postojna	Nova Gorica II	Andrej Šušmelj	SAB	28 September 2018
Ljubljana Center	Ljubljana Vič-Rudnik III	Peter Jožef Česnik	SAB	Elected Minister	Ljubljana Center	Ljubljana Šiška II	Maša Kociper	SAB	28 September 2018
Maribor	Šmarje pri Jelšah	Zdravko Počivalšek	SMC	Elected Minister	Maribor	Maribor IV	Gregor Židan	SMC	28 September 2018
Novo mesto	Zagorje ob Savi	Rudi Medved	LMŠ	Elected Minister	Novo mesto	Hrastnik	Nina Maurovič	LMŠ	28 September 2018
Postojna	Nova Gorica II	Andrej Šušmelj	SAB	Bandelli resigned as minister	Postojna	Sežana	Marko Bandelli	SAB	19 December 2019
Celje	Mozirje	Darij Krajčič	LMŠ	Resignation	Celje	Žalec II	Nik Prebil	LMŠ	5 March 2019
Ljubljana Bežigrad	Ribnica	Ljudmila Novak	NSi	Elected MEP	Ljubljana Bežigrad	Domžale II	Tadeja Šuštar	NSi	9 July 2019
Ljubljana Bežigrad	Ljubljana Bežigrad II	Milan Brglez	SD	Elected MEP	Ljubljana Bežigrad	Ljubljana Bežigrad I	Dušan Verbič	SMC	9 July 2019
Ljubljana Bežigrad	Grosuplje	Janez Janša	SDS	Elected Prime Minister	Ljubljana Bežigrad	Ljubljana Moste-Pollje I	Janez Moškrič	SDS	6 March 2020
Kranj	Radovljica II	Karla Urh	LMŠ	New Government formed	Kranj	Kamnik	Marjan Šarec	LMŠ	13 March 2020
Novo mesto	Hrastnik	Nina Maurovič	LMŠ	New Government formed	Novo mesto	Zagorje ob Savi	Rudi Medved	LMŠ	13 March 2020
Kranj	Kamnik	Matej Tonin	NSi	Elected Minister	Kranj	Škofja Loka II	Mihael Prevc	NSi	19 March 2020
Postojna	Postojna	Zvonko Černač	SDS	Elected Minister	Postojna	Nova Gorica I	Elena Zavadlav Ušaj	SDS	19 March 2020
Postojna	Ajdovščina	Jernej Vrtovec	NSi	Elected Minister	Postojna	Ilirska Bistrica	Andrej Černigoj	NSi	19 March 2020
Ljubljana Center	Logatec	Andrej Šircelj	SDS	Elected Minister	Ljubljana Center	Ljubljana Šiška IV	Leon Merjasec	SDS	19 March 2020
Ljubljana Center	Ljubljana Vič-Rudnik IV	Anže Logar	SDS	Elected Minister	Ljubljana Center	Ljubljana Šiška III	Mojca Škrinjar	SDS	19 March 2020
Kranj	Škofja Loka II	Žan Mahnič	SDS	Named State Secretary	Kranj	Tržič	Jure Ferjan	SDS	19 March 2020
Ptuj	Lenart	Franc Breznik	SDS	Named State Secretary	Ptuj	Ptuj II	Nuša Ferenčič	SDS	TBD
Celje	Šentjur pri Celju	Jelka Godec	SDS	Named State Secretary	Celje	Žalec I	Ljubo Žnidar	SDS	TBD
Ptuj	Ptuj II	Nuša Ferenčič	SDS	Resigned as State Secretary	Ptuj	Lenart	Franc Breznik	SDS	28 April 2020
Kranj	Radovljica I	Franc Kramar	SAB	Deceased	Kranj	Kranj I	Alenka Bratušek	SAB	4 February 2021

=== Changes in the political groups membership ===
Name	Elected for	Previous group	New group
Milan Brglez	SMC	PS SMC	PS SD
Lidija Ivanuša	SNS	PS SNS	PS SDS
Franc Trček	Levica	PS Levica	PS SD
Jani Möderndorfer	SMC (as substitute MP)	PS SMC	PS LMŠ
Gregor Židan	SMC (as substitute MP)	PS SMC	PS SD
Jurij Lep	DeSUS	PS DeSUS	PS NP
Janja Sluga	SMC	PS SMC	PS NP
Igor Zorčič	SMC	PS SMC	PS NP
Branislav Rajić	SMC	PS SMC	PS SAB
Mateja Udovč	SMC	PS Concretely	PS NeP - MU
Željko Cigler	Levica	PS Levica	PS SD

== Working bodies ==
Group		Presidents	Vice-presidents
PS SDS	Group of Slovenian Democratic Party; Poslanska skupina Slovenske demokratske stranke	5 / 21	11 / 38
PS SDS	Commissions of Inquiry	2 / 3	0 / 3
PS LMŠ	Group of List of Marjan Šarec; Poslanska skupina Liste Marjana Šarca	2 / 21	7 / 38
PS LMŠ	Commissions of Inquiry	0 / 3	1 / 3
PS SD	Group of Social Democrats; Poslanska skupina Socialnih demokratov	3 / 21	5 / 38
PS SD	Commissions of Inquiry	0 / 3	1 / 3
PS SMC	Group of Modern Centre Party; Poslanska skupina Stranke modernega centra	2 / 21	6 / 38
PS SMC	Commissions of Inquiry	1 / 3	1 / 3
PS Levica	Group of The Left; Poslanska skupina Levice	2 / 21	2 / 38
PS Levica	Commissions of Inquiry	0 / 3	0 / 3
PS NSi	Group of New Slovenia – Christian Democrats; Poslanska skupina Nove Slovenije – Krščanskih demokratov	2 / 21	3 / 38
PS NSi	Commissions of Inquiry	1 / 3	1 / 3
PS SAB	Group of Party of Alenka Bratušek; Poslanska skupina Stranke Alenke Bratušek	1 / 21	2 / 38
PS SAB	Commissions of Inquiry	0 / 3	0 / 3
PS DeSUS	Group of Democratic Party of Pensioners of Slovenia; Poslanska skupina Demokratične stranke upokojencev Slovenije	2 / 21	0 / 38
PS DeSUS	Commissions of Inquiry	0 / 3	0 / 3
PS SNS	Group of Slovenian National Party; Poslanska skupina Slovenske nacionalne stranke	1 / 21	1 / 38
PS SNS	Commissions of Inquiry	0 / 3	0 / 3
PS IMNS	Group of Italian in Hungarian National Minority; Poslanska skupina italijanske in madžarske narodne skupnosti	1 / 21	1 / 38
PS IMNS	Commissions of Inquiry	0 / 3	0 / 3

=== Committiees ===
Committee	President	Vice-presidents	Secretary (Note: Employee of the NA, not MP.)	Members
Committee on Agriculture, Forestry and Food	Edvard Paulič (LMŠ)	Nada Brinovšek (SDS)	Dragana Čuljković	17
Committee on Agriculture, Forestry and Food	Edvard Paulič (LMŠ)	Jani Ivanuša (SNS)	Dragana Čuljković	17
Committee on Culture	Violeta Tomić (Levica)	Jožef Lenart (SDS)	Marjana Starič	17
Committee on Culture	Violeta Tomić (Levica)	Aljaž Kovačič (LMŠ)	Marjana Starič	17
Committee on Defence	Samo Bevk (SD)	Mateja Udovč (SMC)	Peter Bahčič	17
Committee on Defence	Samo Bevk (SD)	Andrej Černigoj (NSi)	Peter Bahčič	17
Committee on Education, Science, Sport and Youth	Iva Dimic (NSi)	Mojca Škrinjar (SDS)	Danica Polak Gruden	17
Committee on Education, Science, Sport and Youth	Iva Dimic (NSi)	Luka Mesec (Levica)	Danica Polak Gruden	17
Committee on EU Affairs	Marko Pogačnik (SDS)	Marko Koprivc (SD)	Barbara Medved Špiletič	17
Committee on EU Affairs	Marko Pogačnik (SDS)	Nik Prebil (LMŠ)	Barbara Medved Špiletič	17
Committee on Finance	Robert Polnar (DeSUS)	Suzana Lep Šimenk (SDS)	Barbara Reflak	19
Committee on Finance	Robert Polnar (DeSUS)	Marko Bandelli (SAB)	Barbara Reflak	19
Committee on Finance	Robert Polnar (DeSUS)	Dušan Verbič (SMC)	Barbara Reflak	19
Committee on Foreign Policy	Monika Gregorčič (SMC)	Lidija Divjak Mirnik (LMŠ)	Katja Jerman	19
Committee on Foreign Policy	Monika Gregorčič (SMC)	Marijan Pojbič (SDS)	Katja Jerman	19
Committee on Health	Anja Bah Žibert (SDS)	Franc Žndiarič (SD)	Hedvika Stanič Igličar	19
Committee on Health	Anja Bah Žibert (SDS)	Mojca Žnidarič (SMC)	Hedvika Stanič Igličar	19
Committee on Infrastructure, Environment and Spatial Planning	Bojan Podkrajšek (SDS)	Robert Pavšič (LMŠ)	Anton Pelko	19
Committee on Infrastructure, Environment and Spatial Planning	Bojan Podkrajšek (SDS)	Mihael Prevc (NSi)	Anton Pelko	19
Committee on Infrastructure, Environment and Spatial Planning	Bojan Podkrajšek (SDS)	Mateja Udovč (SMC)	Anton Pelko	19
Committee on Justice	Blaž Pavlin (NSi)	Meira Hot (SD)	Marija Pečjak Ferlež	13
Committee on Labour, Family, Social Policy and Disability	Eva Irgl (SDS)	Tadeja Šuštar (NSi)	Tina Kšela Premik	17
Committee on Labour, Family, Social Policy and Disability	Eva Irgl (SDS)	Mojca Žnidarič (SMC)	Tina Kšela Premik	17
Committee on Labour, Family, Social Policy and Disability	Eva Irgl (SDS)	Primož Siter (Levica)	Tina Kšela Premik	17
Committee on the Economy	Branislav Rajić (SMC)	Franc Rosec (SDS)	Nataša Škrbec Srčnik	17
Committee on the Economy	Branislav Rajić (SMC)	Soniboj Knežak (SD)	Nataša Škrbec Srčnik	17
Committee on the Interior, Public Administration and Local Self-Government	Branko Grims (SDS)	Dušan Verbič (SMC)	Ana Komac	19
Committee on the Interior, Public Administration and Local Self-Government	Branko Grims (SDS)	Predrag Bakovič (SD)	Ana Komac	19

==== Former Committees ====
Committee	President	Vice-presidents	Secretary (Note: Employee of the NA, not MP.)	Members
Joint Committee (Note: Temporary general committee, until all of the permanent committees were formed.)	Rudi Medved (LMŠ)	Violeta Tomić (Levica)	Nataša Škrbec Srčnik	/

=== Standing Commissions ===
Commission	President	Vice-presidents	Secretary	Members
Commission for Petitions, Human Rights and Equal Opportunities	Nataša Sukič (Levica)	Lidija Ivanuša (SDS)	Ana Ivas Brezigar	9
Commission for Public Office and Elections	Ivan Hršak (DeSUS)	Andreja Zabret (LMŠ)	Katja Leitinger	19
Commission for Public Office and Elections	Ivan Hršak (DeSUS)	Ljubo Žnidar (SDS)	Katja Leitinger	19
Commission for Relations with Slovenes in Neighbouring and Other Countries	Dušan Šiško (SNS)	Franc Kepa (SDS)	Polona Klemenčič	13
Commission for the National Communities	Ferenc Horváth (IMNS)	Felice Žiža (IMNS)	Rodana Rožanc Krulčič	11
Commission for the Rules of Procedure	Vojko Starovič (SAB)	Boris Doblekar (SDS)	Maja Briški	11
Constitutional Commission	Dejan Židan (SD)	Franc Breznik (SDS)	Boris Vrišer	19
Constitutional Commission	Dejan Židan (SD)	Jože Lenart (LMŠ)	Boris Vrišer	19

=== Supervisory Commissions ===
In supervisory commissions opposition has majority.

Commission	President	Vice-presidents	Secretary	Members
Commission for Public Finance Control	Igor Peček (LMŠ)	Andrej Rajh (SAB)	Jože Končan	13
Commission for the Supervision of Intelligence and Security Services	Matjaž Nemec (SD)	Rudi Medved (LMŠ)	Marinka Bogolin	9

=== Inquiry Commissions ===
Commission	President	Vice-presidents	Secretary	Members
Commission of Inquiry for determining the responsibility of holders of public office in the child cardiology programme and procurement of medical supplies and equipment	Vacant (SDS)	Jani Prednik (SD)	Boris vrišer	9
Commission of Inquiry for investigating abuses and uneconomical practices in the BAMC	Aleksander Reberšek (NSi)	Monika Gregorčič (SMC)	Ana Ivas Brezigar	9
Commission of Inquiry for investigating the alleged money laundering in Nova Kreditna Banka Maribor, d. d., the suspected illegal financing of the Slovenian Democratic Party and the suspected illegal financing of the election campaign for the early elections to the National Assembly in 2018	(SMC)	Aljaž Kovačič (LMŠ)	Zoran Skubic	9
Commission of Inquiry for investigating abuses in the case of Franc Kangler and others	Vacant (SDS)	Tadeja Šuštar (NSi)	Božena Pem	5

=== Other bodies ===
Body	President	Vice-presidents	Members
Council of the Speaker of the National Assembly	Igor Zorčič (TBD)	None (de facto Deputy Speakers)	Speaker and Deputy Speakers (no voting right); Leaders of political groups (voting right); Representatives of National Minorities (voting right)
Club of the Female MPs	Bojana Muršič (SD)	Andreja Zabret (LMŠ)	Female MPs
Club of the Female MPs	Bojana Muršič (SD)	Mateja Udovč (SMC)	Female MPs

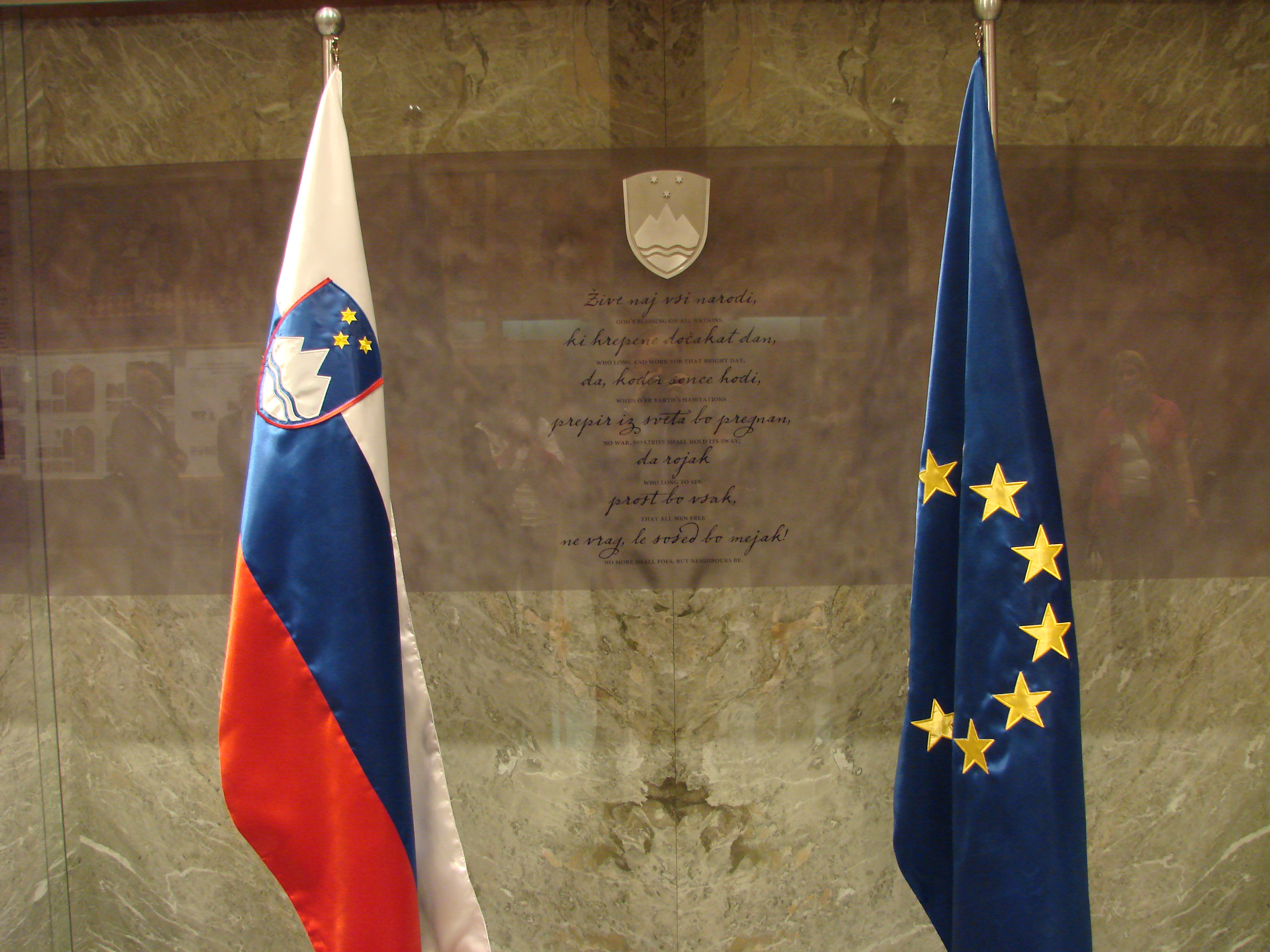
Detail from the Parliament Building, Ljubljana – Slovenian National Anthem

== Appointments ==
For full list of appointments and nominations see Appointments by the 8th National Assembly of the Republic of Slovenia.

=== Elections ===
Date	Proposer	Position	Candidate	Voted	In favour	Against	Invalid	Comments
22 June 2018	50 MPs, first signatory Marjan Šarec	Speaker	Matej Tonin	89	80	9	1	1st Regular Session; secret ballot
17 August 2018	43 MPs, first signatory Brane Golubović	Prime Minister	Marjan Šarec	87	55	31	1	5th Extraordinary Session; secret ballot;
23 August 2018	52 MPs, first signatory Andreja Zabret	Deputy-Speaker	Tina Heferle	83	66	8	9	5th Extraordinary Session; secret ballot
23 August 2018	25 MPs, first signatory Anja Bah Žibert	Deputy-Speaker	Jože Tanko	85	74	3	8	6th Extraordinary Session; secret ballot
23 August 2018	52 MPs, first signatory Matjaž Han	Speaker	Dejan Židan	60	49	8	3	6th Extraordinary Session; secret ballot
29 August 2018	52 MPs, first signatory Franc Jurša	Deputy-Speaker	Branko Simonovič	78	67	7	4	7th Extraordinary Session; secret ballot
29 August 2018	Council of the Speaker	Secretary-General	Uršula Zore Tavčar	76	76	0	/	7th Extraordinary Session; roll call
13 September 2018	Prime Minister-elect Marjan Šarec	Ministers of the 13th Government		79	45	34	/	8th Extraordinary Session; roll call
3 March 2020	President of the Republic Borut Pahor	Prime Minister	Janez Janša	84	52	31	1	16th Regular Session; secret ballot
5 March 2020	47 MPs, first signatory Janja Sluga	Speaker	Igor Zorčič	88	48	29	11	16th Regular Session; secret ballot
13 March 2020	Prime Minister-elect Janez Janša	Ministers of the 14th Government		84	52	31	1	31st Extraordinary Session; public vote

=== Motions for removal ===
Motion for removal can be submitted by the same proposer who proposed designee's election and it is decided about removal by the same procedure that was needed for the election.

Date	Proposer	Position	Designee	Voted	In favour	Against	Invalid	Comments
23 August 2018	49 MPs, first signatory Brane Golubović	Speaker	Matej Tonin	Tonin announced his resignation.				secret ballot; after Matej Tonin is removed from office, Tina Heferle (LMŠ) (if elected Deputy-Speaker) will become Acting-Speaker until new Speaker is elected. PROPOSER WITHDREW THE MOTION.

== Composition of the executive ==
Executive

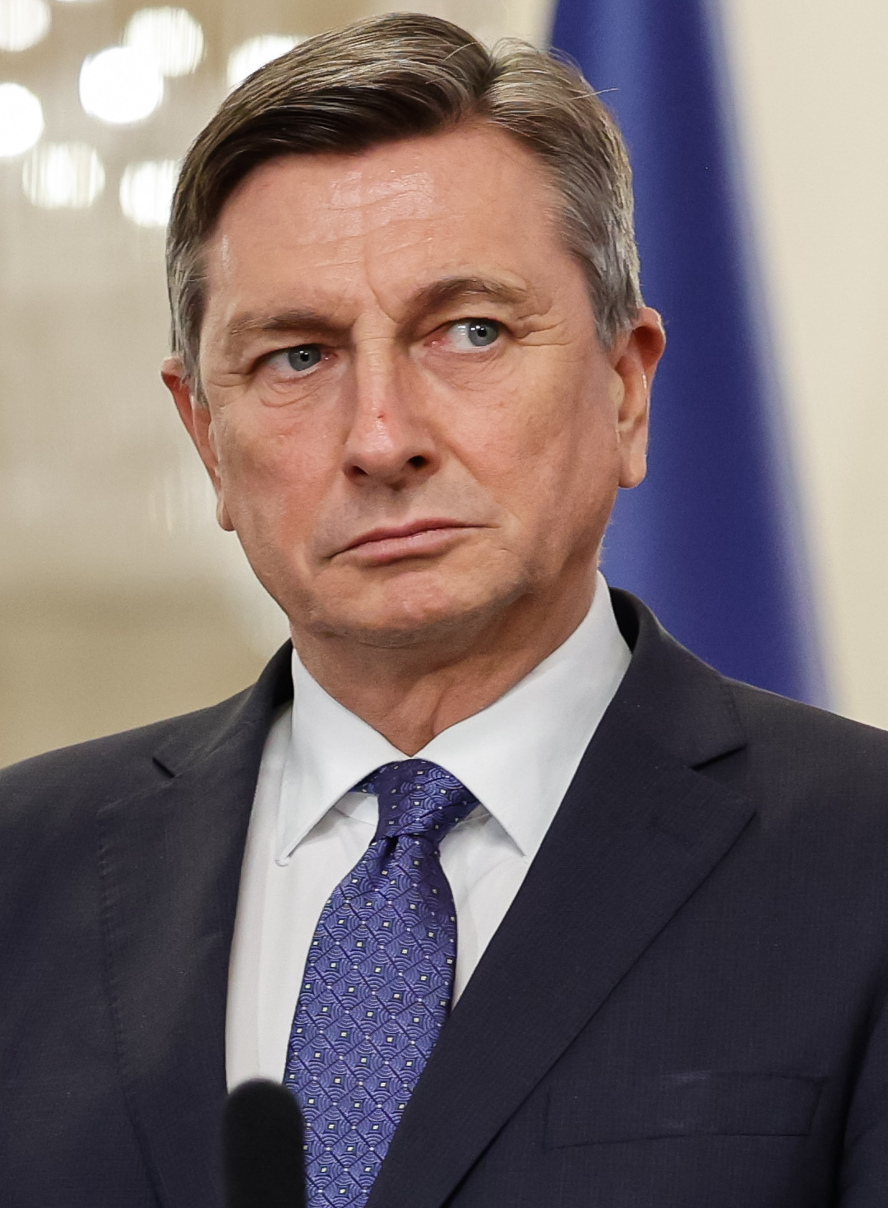
Incumbent
President of the Republic
Borut Pahor (SD)
2012–2022

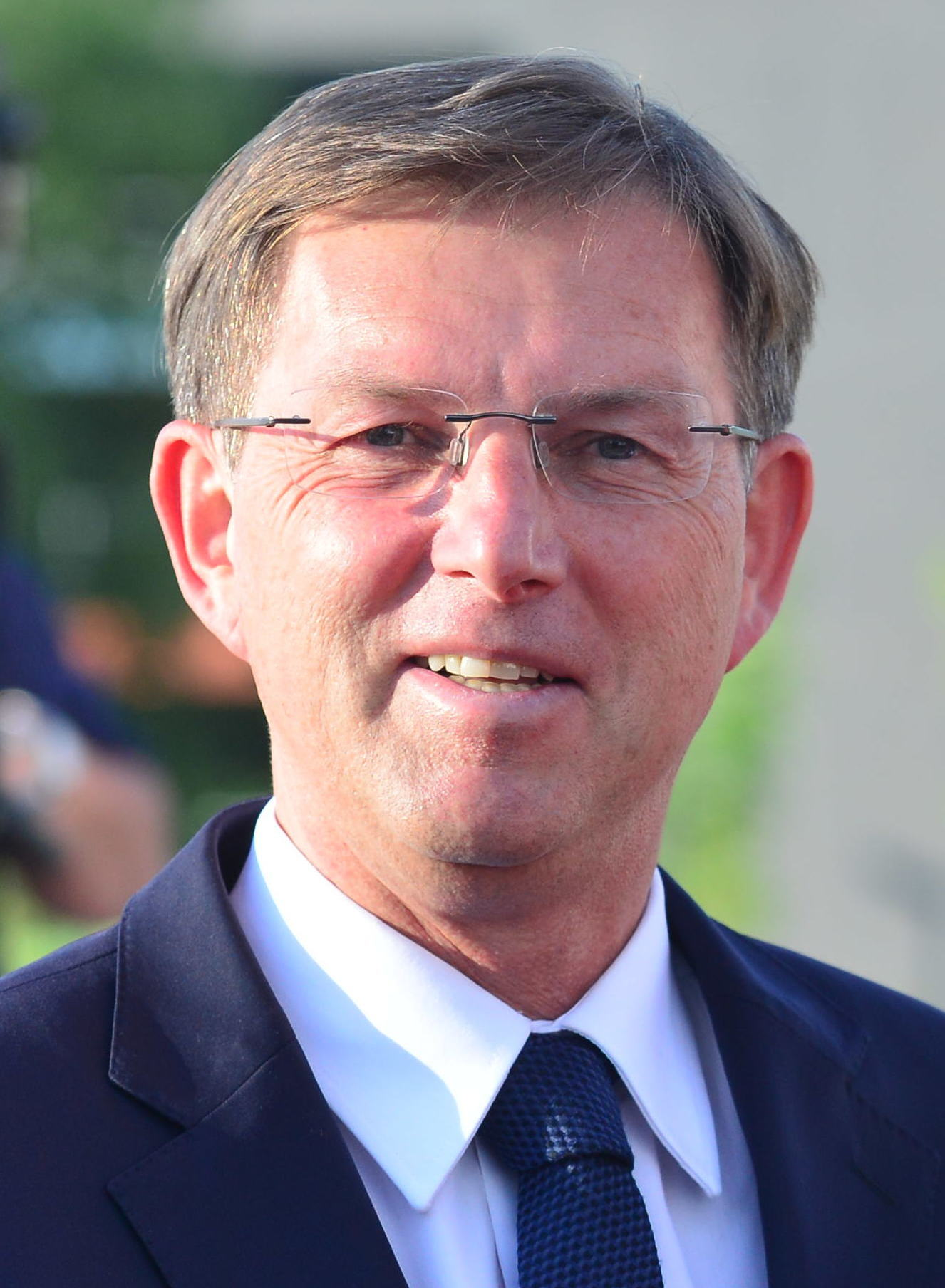
Former
Acting Prime Minister
Miro Cerar (then SMC)
(2014–) 2018

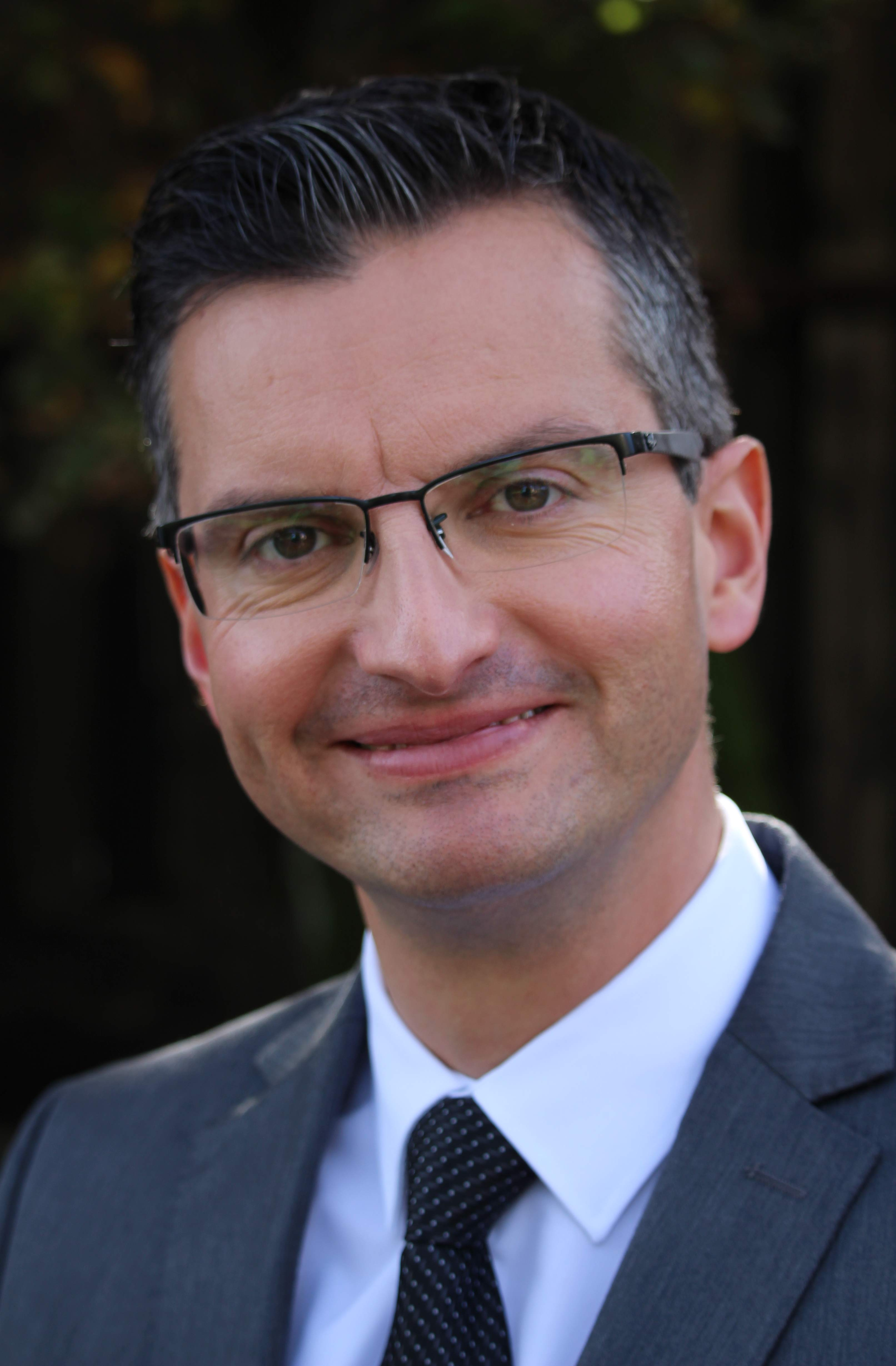
Former
Prime Minister
Marjan Šarec (LMŠ)
2018–2020

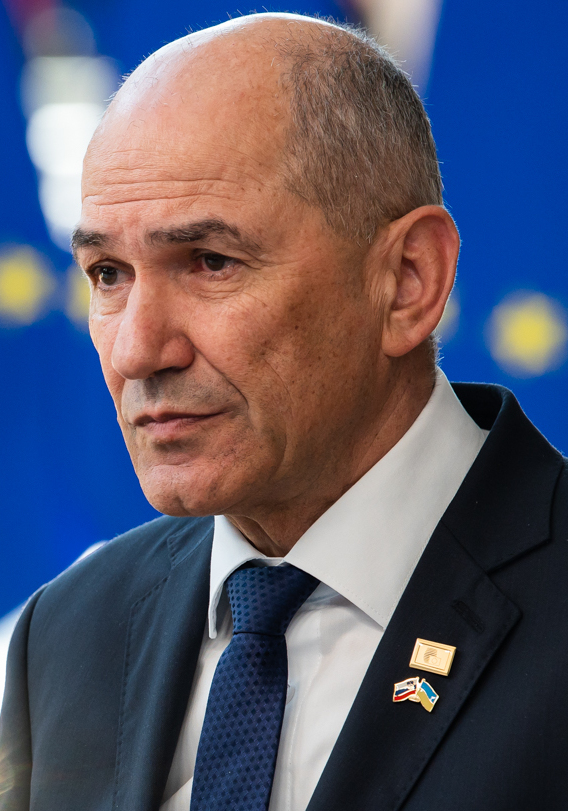
Former
Prime Minister
Janez Janša (SDS)
2020–2022

- President of the Republic: Borut Pahor (SD), from 22 December 2012
- Government:
  - 12th Government (18 September 2014 – 13 September 2018)
    - Prime Minister: Miro Cerar (SMC)
  - 13th Government (13 September 2018 – 13 March 2020)
    - Prime Minister: Marjan Šarec (LMŠ)
  - 14th Government (3 March 2020 – )
    - Prime Minister: Janez Janša (SDS)

=== Interpellations, votes of confidence, and impeachement ===
==== Interpellations ====
According to the Article 118 of the Constitution at least 10 MPs can submit and interpelation against a minister or government as a whole.

Date of vote	Proposer	Interpellated	Quorum	In favour	Against	Abstain	Comments
21 June 2019	SDS	Karl Erjavec, Minister of Defence	74	35	39	0	Interpellation due to the alleged misuse of the military intelligence service.
11 June 2020	LMŠ, SD, Levica, SAB	Zdravko Počivalšek, Minister of Economic Development and Technology	89	37	51	1	Interpellation due to alleged wrongdoings during COVID-19 epidemic related to the purchase of protective equipment

==== Votes of confidence ====
Prime Minister can, according to the Article 117 of the Constitution request a vote of confidence. If government does not win the vote of confidence, National Assembly has to elect new Prime Minister within 30 days. If it fails, President of the Republic dissolves the National Assembly and snap election takes place within 60 days.

Also, according to the Article 116 of the Constitution, 10 MPs can propose a vote of no confidence and at the same time propose a candidate for the new Prime Minister.

==== Impeachment ====
Based on Articles 109 and 119 of the Constitution National Assembly may impeach President of the Republic, Prime Minister or ministers before the Constitutional Court if they violate the Constitution or laws.

Date of vote	Proposer	Interpellated	Quorum	In favour	Against	Abstain	Comments
29 January 2019	SDS and SNS	Marjan Šarec, Prime Minister	89	29	53	7	Impeachment for not implementing the decision of the Constitutional Court regarding the financing of the private primary education.

== Legislative services heads ==
- Secretary-General: Uršula Zore Tavčar
  - Head of the Secretariat and Deputy Secretary-General: Jerneja Bergoč
    - Head of29 the Sector for the activities of the National Assembly: Mojca Marn Čepuran
      - Head of the department for preparation of sessions of the National Assembly and working bodies:
      - Head of the department for international activity, protocol and translation: Tatjana Pandev
    - Head of the Research and documentation sector: Tatjana Krašovec
      - Head of the Research department: Igor Zobavnik
      - Head of the Documentation and Library Department: Vojka Vuk Dirnbek
  - Director and Deputy Secretary-General: Igor Ivančič
    - Head of the General sector: Anita Longo
      - Head of the Department of Organization and Staff: Sonja Nahtigal
      - Head of the Financial department: Rok Tomšič
    - Head of the Information sector:
      - Head of the Information Systems Development Department: Bojan Verbič
      - Head of the department for work with materials and mail: Gordana Černe
      - Head of the Department of Operations Service: Jela Jelič
      - Head of the department for printing: Iztok Potočnik
    - Head of the Operational-technical sector: Alenka Urbančič
      - Head of the Investment and Maintenance Department: Janez Gomboc
      - Head of the Catering Department: Verica Novaković
      - Head of the Department of Transportation: Ivo Paal
      - Head of the Department for Reception and Telephones: Anita Knez
- Services of the political groups
  - Expert assistance for the political groups
- Head of the Office of the President: Katarina Ratoša
- Head of the Legal Service: Nataša Voršič
- Head of the Public Relations Office: Karmen Uglešič
- Permanent Representative of the National Assembly to the European Parliament: Zvone Bergant

== International activity ==
=== Delegations ===
Delegation	Head	Secretary
Delegation to the Parliamentary Assembly of the Council of Europe	Vacant	Alja Škibin
Delegation to the NATO Parliamentary Assembly	Robert Pavšič (LMŠ)	Tamara Gruden Pečan
Delegation to the CEI Parliamentary Dimension	Branko Grims (SDS)	Staša Kobi Šmid
Delegation to the Parliamentary Assembly of the Union for the Mediterranean	Branislav Rajić (SMC)	Romana Novak
IPU National Group in the National Assembly	Matjaž Nemec (SD) (ex officio as President of CFP)	Tatjana Pandev
Delegation to the SEECP Parliamentary Assembly	Dejan Židan (SD) (ex officio as Speaker)	Tatjana Pandev
Delegation to the Parliamentary Assembly of the OSCE	Gregor Perič (SMC)	Tamara Gruden Pečan
Delegation of the National Assembly in the Group for Joint Parliamentary Supervision of EUROPOL	Tina Heferle (LMŠ)	Maja Brišk

=== Friendship groups ===
Country	President	Country	President	Country	President
Republic of Austria	Vacant	Kingdom of Denmark	Monika Gregorčič (SMC)	Kingdom of the Netherlands	Igor Zorčič (TBD)
Bosnia and Herzegovina	Marko Koprivc (SD)	Republic of Finland	Branislav Rajić (SMC)	United Kingdom of Great Britain and Northern Ireland	Branislav Rajić (SMC)
French Republic	Matjaž Nemec (SD)	Republic of India	Suzana Lep Šimenko (SDS)	Republic of Estonia	Franc Trček (Levica)
Republic of Croatia	Jani Prednik (SD)	Japan	Branislav Rajić (SMC)	Canada	Franc Trček (Levica)
Ireland	Bojana Muršič (SD)	Republic of Korea	Suzana Lep Šimenko (SDS)	Republic of Kazakhstan	Zmago Jelinčič Plemeniti (SNS)
Italian Republic	Meira Hot (SD)	Kingdom of Norway	Vacant	Republic of Kosovo	Franc Trček (Levica)
State of Israel	Vacant	Republic of Poland	Suzana Lep Šimenko (SDS)	Romania	Franc Trček (Levica)
People's Republic of China	Lidija Divjak Mirnik (LMŠ)	Slovak Republic	Tomaž Lisec (SDS)	Federative Republic of Brazil	Alenka Jeraj (SDS)
Hungary	Ferenc Horváth (IMNS)	Kingdom of Spain	Bojana Muršič (SD)	Republic of Cyprus	Jani Prednik (SD)
Republic of North Macedonia	Iva Dimic (NSi)	Kingdom of Spain	Vacant	Arab Republic of Egypt	Matjaž Nemec (SD)
Federal Republic of Germany	Branko Grims (SDS)	Republic of Turkey	Monika Gregorčič (SMC)	Swiss Confederation	Branislav Rajić (SMC)
Palestine	Matej Tašner Vatovec (Levica)	Ukraine	Vojko Starović (SAB)	Republic of Albania	Franc Trček (Levica)
Portuguese Republic	Franc Trček (Levica)	Argentine Republic	Alenka Jeraj (SDS)	Hellenic Republic	Jani Prednik (SD)
Russian Federation	Matjaž Han (SD)	Commonwealth of Australia	Andreja Zabret (LMŠ)	Georgia	Predrag Baković (SD)
Republic of Serbia	Predrag Baković (SD)	Republic of Azerbaijan	Matjaž Nemec (SD)	Republic of Latvia	Jani Prednik (SD)
United States of America	Matjaž Nemec (SD)	Kingdom of Belgium	Gregor Perič (SMC)	Republic of Lithuania	Nik Prebil (LMŠ)
Czech Republic	Tomaž Lisec (SDS)	Republic of Iceland	Andreja Zabret (LMŠ)	Republic of Malta	Jani Prednik (SD)
Montenegro	Tomaž Lisec (SDS)	Grand-Duchy of Lusembourg	Lidija Divjak Mirnik (LMŠ)	Republic of Bulgaria	Alenka Jeraj (SDS)

== Other ==
=== Zmago Jelinčič Plemeniti (SNS) corruption allegations ===
It was reported on 29 June 2018 that Parliamentary Assembly of the Council of Europe's (PACE) special independent investigative body issued its report on so called Caviar diplomacy by Azerbaijan. Zmago Jelinčič Plemeniti (SNS), who returned in the National Assembly after 7 years in the last election, was banned from entering Council of Europe due to severe violation of the PACE's rules. Jelinčič was accused of receiving €25,000 for voting against the report of the PACE stating that irregularities occurred during elections in Azerbaijan, which he observed. Jelinčič declined accusations and stated that he received money to translate Tone Svetina's novel Ukana into Russian language, however translation of the book is nowhere to be found, reported Slovenian media. Jelinčič was named vice-president of the Committee on Foreign Policy on 3 July 2018. However The Left, which also supported the resolution, with which leaders of the committees were named, stated that their support was a mistake. Other parties, SDS, LMŠ and SAB stated that current leaders of the committees are only temporary and that new leaders will be named after coalition is formed and all the committees founded. Some, including GRECO and TI, also called on the National Assembly to finally form and pass an Ethical Code for MPs. Slovenian Commission for the prevention of corruption announced that it will investigate the case.

=== Milan Brglez (SMC) expulsion from the party ===
Milan Brglez was soon after the election, on 26 June 2018 expelled from the party. Reason for that was his self-candidature for Speaker of the National Assembly, since Miro Cerar did not have support of potential coalition partners (LMŠ, SD, NSi, SAB and DeSUS) to become Speaker himself. Executive committee also blamed Brglez that he did not respect decision of the parties and has been making statements that were opposite to the statements of Cerar and other party officials. As example they added that Cerar supported US missile strikes against Syria earlier in April and Brglez did not and stated that these acts are against international law and Slovenian Constitution. He decided to stay member of the SMC group in the Assembly, but did not rule out the possibility to join another group later, most possibly The Left.

=== Zdravko Počivalšek (SMC) lobbying affair ===
On 2 August 2018 Commission for the prevention of corruption issued its report on Zdravko Počivalšek's unlawful meetings with former President of Executive Council of SRS (Prime Minister) and former Director of State Security Service (SDV) Janez Zemljarič who is seen as one of the most important people in Slovenia as a part of so-called "Deep State". Počivalšek tried to prevent the publishing of the report, however Supreme Court decided that contents of their meetings can be publicly announced. Meetings were against the law because Počivašek as public servant did not report them to the Commission and because Zemljarič is not registered as lobbyst or representative of any company, but was however acting in such way. Meetings were made public by Reporter's journalist in 2016. Zemljarič and Počivalšek were talking about construction of Izolski otok (Izola Island) project worth around half billion euros. It is reported that State Secretary Eva Štravs Podlogar (SD) met with Zemljarič as well.

=== Zmago Jelinčič Plemeniti (SNS) appropriation of books ===
During 2008–2011 term of the 5th National Assembly political group of Slovenian National Party ordered books using National Assembly funds. Books should have been returned to the National Assembly Library after

During the 2008–2011 term of the 5th National Assembly, the political group of the Slovenian National Party commissioned books worth more than €10,000 through the National Assembly. At the end of the mandate, the books should have been returned to the National Assembly's Library, which had not been doneby the political group which referred to the fact that the books belong to the political group. Subsequently, the Public Prosecutor's Office filed a lawsuit against Zmago Jelinčič, which failed because the prosecutor's office should sue the political group and not Jelinčič. The state originally obtained the judgment and recovered €10,000 from Jelinčič, but the money had to be returned after Jelinčič's appeal and the nullification of the verdict.

=== Constitutional problems ===
==== Incompatibility of functions ====
Prime Minister Miro Cerar (SMC) and ministers Dejan Židan (SD) and Zdravko Počivalšek (SMC) have been elected MPs at the last elections. This causes constitutional problems since according to the Constitution Prime Minister or minister cannot be MP at the same time. Since Constitution also states that all members of the government have to execute their power until new government is elected they still are members of the government. This has however happened before, but it has never taken so long to officially form new coalition and elect new government after elections. Also currently Slovenia has some important questions opened, most importantly – selling NLB bank according to the 2013 agreement with European Commission, because of which government submits many bills to the National Assembly. And because Cerar, Židan and Počivalšek are also MPs they vote on bills that their government submitted to the Assembly.

==== Nullification of the elections ====
Former SD MP and Speaker Janko Veber, Vili Kovačič, Gašper Ferjan, Andreja Magajna (former SD MP) and Jožef Jarh filed an appeal against 3 June elections results and requested that Supreme Court annules elections. Following Supreme Court's rejection they filed an apply to the Constitutional Court who rejected them as well. They claimed laws regulating elections are unconstitutional.

==== Elections of the Speaker with no deputy-speaker elected ====
On 6 August Marjan Šarec announced that five parties gathered around LMŠ (including SMC, SD, DeSUS and SAB) will propose a candidate for the new Speaker – Dejan Židan (SD). However Legal Service of the National Assembly explained that new Speaker cannot be elected before at least one Deputy-Speaker is elected first, which would become Acting-Speaker when current Speaker Matej Tonin would resign, following forming a new coalition.

==== Majority in the supervisory commissions ====
Another problem might occur with memberships of the standing supervisory commissions. It is the first time in the history that Slovenia will have minority government, and majority in the commissions must have parties in the opposition. Since The Left will support the government and still be formally in the opposition it could happen that the government might have ensured majority in the commissions with votes from The Left.

==== Šarec Government – minority or majority government? ====
Some of the constitutional lawyers, including former Judge of the Constitutional Court and former MP, now Full Professor Ciril Ribičič, questioned the status of the potential Government of Marjan Šarec. Many of them agree that it will be in fact majority government, since Prime Minister will be elected in the second round, where still 46 votes are needed for the election (absolute majority). Although The Left will not nominate ministers in the Government, they are still seen as a coalition party, meaning that new government in fact has majority in the parliament.

== Results of the parliamentary elections ==
Party/alliance	Votes	%	Seats	+/–
Slovenian Democratic Party	222,042	24.92	25	+4
List of Marjan Šarec	112,250	12.60	13	New
Social Democrats	88,524	9.93	10	+4
Modern Centre Party	86,868	9.75	10	−26
The Left	83,108	9.33	9	+3
New Slovenia – Christian Democrats	63,792	7.16	7	+2
Party of Alenka Bratušek	45,492	5.11	5	+1
Democratic Party of Pensioners of Slovenia	43,889	4.93	5	−5
Slovenian National Party	37,182	4.17	4	+4
Slovenian People's Party	23,329	2.62	0	0
Pirate Party	19,182	2.15	0	0
Good Country	13,540	1.52	0	−1
Andrej Čuš and Greens of Slovenia	9,708	1.09	0	−2
List of Journalist Bojan Požar	7,835	0.88	0	0
For a Healthy Society	5,548	0.62	0	0
United Slovenia	5,287	0.59	0	0
United Left and Unity	5,072	0.57	0	−1
Movement Together Forward	4,345	0.49	0	0
Save Slovenia from Elite and Tycoons	3,672	0.41	0	0
Economic Active Party	3,132	0.35	0	0
Solidarity – For a Fair Society!	2,184	0.25	0	0
United Right	2,141	0.24	0	0
Socialist Party of Slovenia	1,551	0.17	0	0
Party of Slovenian People	1,237	0.14	0	0
Forward Slovenia	187	0.02	0	0
Invalid/blank votes	10,357	–	–	–
Total	901,454	100	88	–
Registered voters/turnout	1,712,676	52.64	–	–
Source: Volitve

=== Elections of the representatives of national minorities ===
==== Italian national minority ====
Candidate	Points	Notes
Felice Žiža	2,511	Elected
Mauricio Tremul	2,095	
Bruno Orlando	1,001	
Valid votes	1,428	
Invalid/blank votes	19	
Total	1,447	
Source: Volitve

==== Hungarian national minority ====
Candidate	Points	Notes
Ferenc Horvath	4,193	Elected
Gabriela Sobočan	2,772	
Valid votes	3,001	
Invalid/blank votes	42	
Total	3,043	
Source: Volitve
