= Appointments by the 8th National Assembly of the Republic of Slovenia =

This is a list of appointments by the 8th National Assembly of the Republic of Slovenia:

== General ==
National Assembly according to the Constitution and laws appoints:

Position	Number	Proposer	Term	Votes needed for election	Eligible for re-election	Comments
Speaker	1	MPs	4 years	46	Yes	secret ballot
Deputy-Speaker	up to 3	MPs	4 years	46	Yes	secret ballot
Prime Minister	1	President of the Republic	4 years	46	Yes	secret ballot
ministers		Prime Minister	4 years	46	Yes	
Judge of the Constitutional Court	9	President of the Republic	9 years	60	No	secret ballot
President of the Supreme Court	1	Minister of Justice	6 years	46	Yes	
Vice-president of the Supreme Court	1	Minister of Justice	6 years	46	Yes	
Human Rights Ombudsman	1	President of the Republic	6 years	60	Yes, once	
Deputy Human Rights Ombudsman	up to 4	Human Rights Ombudsman	6 years	46	Yes	
Judge of Local/District/High/Supreme Court		Judicial Council	lifetime	46		
Secretary-General of the National Assembly	1	Council of the Speaker	till the end of the term of the National Assembly	46	Yes	
Member of the Judicial Council of the Republic of Slovenia	5	President of the Republic	6 years	46	Yes, but not consecutively	
Governor of the Bank of Slovenia	1	President of the Republic	6 years	46	Yes	
Vice-Governor of the Bank of Slovenia	4	President of the Republic	6 years	46	Yes	
Information Commissioner	1	President of the Republic	5 years	46	Yes, once	
President of the Court of Audit	1	President of the Republic	9 years	46	Yes	
Deputy President of the Court of Audit	2	President of the Republic	9 years	46	Yes	
Member of the supervisory board of the Radiotelevizija Slovenija	5	Commission for Public Office and Elections	4 years	46	Yes	
Members of the Programming Council of the Radiotelevizija Slovenija	5	Commission for Public Office and Elections	4 years	46	Yes	
President of the National Review Commission	1	Commission for Public Office and Elections	5 years	majority of present MPs	Yes	
Member of the National Review Commission	4	Commission for Public Office and Elections	5 years	majority of present MPs	Yes	
Member of the Slovenian National Commission for UNESCO	1	Commission for Public Office and Elections	4 years	majority of present MPs	Yes	
Director of the Securities Market Agency	1	Government of the Republic of Slovenia	6 years	majority of present MPs	Yes	
Members of the Council of the Securities Market Agency	4	Government of the Republic of Slovenia	6 years	majority of present MPs	Yes	
President of the executive board of the Fund for Decommissioning Nuclear Power Plant Krško	1	Commission for Public Office and Elections	4 years	majority of present MPs	Yes	
Member of the executive board of the Fund for Decommissioning Nuclear Power Plant Krško	2	Commission for Public Office and Elections	4 years	majority of present MPs	Yes	
President of the supervisory board of the Fund for Decommissioning Nuclear Power Plant Krško	1	Commission for Public Office and Elections	5 years	majority of present MPs	Yes	
Member of the supervisory board of the Fund for Decommissioning Nuclear Power Plant Krško	9	Commission for Public Office and Elections	5 years	majority of present MPs	Yes	
Judge of the European Court of Justice	1	President of the Republic	6 years	46	Yes	secret ballot
Members and Deputies of the State Election Commission	12	Commission for Public Office and Elections	4 years	46	Yes	
Members of the Council of Experts of the Insurance Supervision Agency	5	Government of the Republic of Slovenia	6 years	majority of present MPs	Yes	
Members of the supervisory board of the Slovenian Sovereign Holding	5	Government of the Republic of Slovenia	5 years	majority of present MPs	Yes	
Members of the supervisory board of the Slovenian Press Agency	4	Government of the Republic of Slovenia	4 years	majority of present MPs	Yes, once	
Judge of the European Court for Human Rights	3	President of the Republic	9 years	46	Yes	secret ballot
Advocate of the principle of equality	1	President of the Republic	5 years	46	Yes, once	
Members of the Fiscal Council	3	Government of the Republic of Slovenia	5 years	60	Yes, once	
Members of the Broadcasting Council	7	Commission for Public Office and Elections	5 years	majority of present MPs	Yes	
Members of the Council of the Slovenian Competition Protection Agency	4	Government of the Republic of Slovenia	5 years	majority of present MPs	Yes	
Director of the Slovenian Competition Protection Agency	1	Government of the Republic of Slovenia	5 years	majority of present MPs	Yes, once	
Member and Deputy of the Council for the Salary system in the public sector	2	Commission for Public Office and Elections	4 years	majority of present MPs	Yes	
Members of the Council of the Foundation for financing disability and humanitarian organizations	20	several proposers	5 years	majority of present MPs	Yes, once	
Members of the Council of the Foundation for the financing of sports organizations	16	several proposers	5 years	majority of present MPs	Yes, once	
Members of the Council of the Agency for Energy	6	Government of the Republic of Slovenia	6 years	majority of present MPs	Yes, once	
Members of the Statistical Council	3	Commission for Public Office and Elections	4 years	majority of present MPs	Yes	
Judges of the Permanent Court of Arbitration	3	President of the Republic	6 years	46	Yes	secret ballot
Members of the State Prosecutorial Council	4	President of the Republic	6 years	46	Yes, but not consecutively	
Members of the Electronic Communications Council	11	Commission for Public Office and Elections	5 years	majority of present MPs	Yes	

== Appointments ==
Date	Proposer	Position	Candidate	Voted	In favour	Against	Invalid	Comments
22 June 2018	50 MPs, first signatory Marjan Šarec	Speaker	Matej Tonin	89	80	9	1	1st Regular Session; secret ballot
17 August 2018	43 MPs, first signatory Brane Golubović	Prime Minister	Marjan Šarec	87	55	31	1	5th Extraordinary Session; secret ballot
23 August 2018	52 MPs, first signatory Andreja Zabret	Deputy-Speaker	Tina Heferle	83	66	8	9	5th Extraordinary Session; secret ballot
23 August 2018	25 MPs, first signatory Anja Bah Žibert	Deputy-Speaker	Jože Tanko	85	74	3	8	6th Extraordinary Session; secret ballot
23 August 2018	52 MPs, first signatory Matjaž Han	Speaker	Dejan Židan	60	49	8	3	6th Extraordinary Session; secret ballot
29 August 2018	52 MPs, first signatory Franc Jurša	Deputy-Speaker	Branko Simonovič	78	67	7	4	7th Extraordinary Session; secret ballot
29 August 2018	Council of the Speaker	Secretary-General	Uršula Zore Tavčar	76	76	0	/	7th Extraordinary Session; public vote

== Nominations ==
Date	Proposer	Position	Candidate
17 July 2018	Judicial Council of the Republic of Slovenia	Judge at Trbovlje Local Court	Sašo Kmet
17 July 2018	Judicial Council of the Republic of Slovenia	Judge at Trbovlje Local Court	Blaž Guna
3 September 2018	Judicial Council of the Republic of Slovenia	Judge at Litija Local Court	Blaž Godec

=== Expected nominations during the term ===
2018:

- Governor of the Bank of Slovenia (Governor Boštjan Jazbec named member of the Single Resolution Board) - proposed by President of the Republic
- Judge of the Constitutional Court (term of President and Judge Jadranka Sovdat ends on 18 December 2018) - proposed by President of the Republic

2019:

- Human Rights Ombudsman (term of Ombudsman Vlasta Nussdorfer ends on 22 February 2019) - proposed by President of the Republic
- Judge of the Constitutional Court (term of Judge Etelka Korpič-Horvat ends on 27 September 2019) - proposed by President of the Republic

2020:

- Judge of the Constitutional Court (term of Judge Dunja Jadek Pensa ends on 14 July 2020) - proposed by President of the Republic

2021:

- Vice-Governor of the Bank of Slovenia (term of Vice-Governor Irena Vodopivec Jean ends on 6 October 2021) - proposed by President of the Republic

2022:

- First Deputy President of the Court of Audit (term of First Deputy President Jorg Kristijan Petrovič ends on 31 January 2022) - proposed by President of the Republic
- Vice-Governor of the Bank of Slovenia (term of Vice-Governor Marko Bošnjak ends on 4 March 2022) - proposed by President of the Republic
- Vice-Governor of the Bank of Slovenia (term of Vice-Governor Primož Dolenc ends on 5 April 2022) - proposed by President of the Republic
- President of the Court of Audit (term of President Tomaž Vesel ends on 23 April 2022) - proposed by President of the Republic
