= 7th National Assembly of Slovenia =

7th National Assembly: 7. Državni zbor

Type
- Type: Lower house of the Slovenian Parliament

History
- Founded: 23 December 1992

Leadership
- Speaker: Milan Brglez, SMC since 1 August 2014

Structure
- Seats: 90 seats
- Political groups: SMC (33); SDS (19); DeSUS (11); SD (6); Levica (5); NSi (5); Independent (9); National minorities (2)

Elections
- Voting system: Proportional representation
- Last election: 13 July 2014

Meeting place
- Building of the National Assembly, Ljubljana; Great Hall of the National Assembly

Website
- www.dz-rs.si

The 7th National Assembly of the Republic of Slovenia was elected in the Slovenian parliamentary election held on July 13, 2014.

== Political parties ==
Group		Leader	Seats
SMC	Modern Centre Party; Stranka modernega centra	Miro Cerar; MP, Prime Minister	33 / 90
SDS	Slovenian Democratic Party; Slovenska demokratska stranka	Janez Janša; MP, Former PM	19 / 90
DeSUS	Democratic Party of Pensioners of Slovenia; Demokratična stranka upokojencev Slovenije	Karl Erjavec; Minister of Foreign Affairs	11 / 90
SD	Social Democrats; Socialni demokrati	Dejan Židan; MP, Minister of Agriculture, Forestry and Food	6 / 90
Levica	The Left; Levica	Luka Mesec; MP	5 / 90
NSi	New Slovenia - Christian Democrats; Nova Slovenija - Krščanski demokrati	Matej Tonin; MP, Speaker of the National Assembly	5 / 90
SAB	Party of Alenka Bratušek; Stranka Alenke Bratušek	Alenka Bratušek; Former PM	2 / 90

== Leadership ==
=== National Assembly leadership ===
Position	MP
Speaker	Milan Brlgez (SMC)
Deputy Speaker	Matjaž Nemec (SD)
Deputy Speaker	Primož Heinz (DeSUS)

=== Leaders of the political groups ===
Group		Leader
PS SMC	Group of Modern Centre Party; Poslanska skupina Stranke modernega centra	Simona Kustec Lipicer
PS SDS	Group of Slovenian Democratic Party; Poslanska skupina Slovenske demokratske stranke	Jože Tanko
PS DeSUS	Group of Democratic Party of Pensioners of Slovenia; Poslanska skupina Demokratične stranke upokojencev Slovenije	Franc Jurša
PS SD	Group of Social Democrats; Poslanska skupina Socialnih demokratov	Matjaž Han
PS Levica	Group of The Left; Poslanska skupina Levice	Luka Mesec
PS NSi	Group of New Slovenia - Christian Democrats; Poslanska skupina Nove Slovenije - Krščanskih demokratov	Jožef Horvat
PS SAB	Group of Independent MPs; Poslanska skupina Nepovezanih poslancev	Bojan Dobovšek
PS IMNS	Group of Italian in Hungarian National Minority; Poslanska skupina italijanske in madžarske narodne skupnosti	Felice Žiža

== Changes in membership ==
=== Changes of MPs ===
Changes are expected when a new government is formed. MP's who have served as Prime Minister, Minister, State Secretary or Secretary-General of the government, cannot be MP any longer and are replaced with an MP not having previously served in cabinet positions.

Vacated by				Reason for change	Successor				
Constituency	District	Name	Party	Reason for change	Constituency	District	Name	Party	Date of installation

== Working bodies ==
=== Committees ===
Committee	President	Vice-presidents
Committee on Agriculture, Forestry and Food	Tomaž Lisec (SDS)	
Committee on Culture	Dragan Matić (SMC)	
Committee on Defence	Žan Mahnič (SDS)	
Committee on Education, Science, Sport and Youth	Mirjam Bon Klanjšček (SAB)	
Committee on EU Affairs	Kamal Izidor Shaker (SMC)	
Committee on Finance and Monetary Policy	Urška Ban (SMC)	
Committee on Foreign Policy	Jožef Horvat (NSi)	
Committee on Health	Tomaž Gantar (DeSUS)	
Committee on Infrastructure, Environment and Spatial Planning	Igor Zorčič (SMC)	
Committee on Justice	Jan Škoberne (SD)	
Committee on Labour, Family, Social Policy and Disability	Uroš Prikl (DeSUS)	
Committee on the Economy		
Committee on the Interior, Public Administration and Local Self-Government	Dušan Verbič (SMC)	

=== Standing Commissions ===
Commission	President	Vice-presidents
Commission for Petitions, Human Rights and Equal Opportunities	Eva Irgl (SDS)	
Commission for Public Finance Control	Andrej Šircelj (SDS)	
Commission for Public Office and Elections	Mitja Horvat (SMC)	
Commission for Relations with Slovenes in Neighbouring and Other Countries	Lazslo Göncz (IMNS)	
Commission for the National Communities	Ivan Hršak (DeSUS)	
Commission for the Rules of Procedure	Matej Tašner Vatovec (Levica)	
Commission for the Supervision of Intelligence and Security Services	Branko Grims (SDS)	
Constitutional Commission	Milan Brglez (SMC)	

=== Other bodies ===
Body	President	Vice-presidents	Members
Council of the Speaker of the National Assembly	Milan Brglez (SMC)		Speaker and Deputy Speakers (no voting right); Leaders of political groups (voting right); Representatives of National Minorities (voting right)
Club of the Female MPs	Suzana Lep Šimenko (SDS)	Marija Antonija Kovačič (DeSUS); Andreja Potočnik (SMC)	Female MPs

== Appointments and nominations ==
National Assembly appoints:

- Speaker and Deputy-Speakers (on the proposal of MPs),
- Prime Minister (on the proposal of the President of the Republic or MPs),
- ministers (on the proposal of the Prime Minister),
- judges of the Constitutional Court (on the proposal of the President of the Republic),
- President and vice-president of the Supreme Court (on the proposal of the Minister of Justice),
- Human Rights Ombudsman (on the proposal of the President of the Republic),
- judges of all regular courts (on the proposal of the Judicial Council),
- Secretary-General of the National Assembly (on the proposal of the Council of the Speaker),
- 5 members of the Judicial Council of the Republic of Slovenia (on the proposal of the President of the Republic),
- Governor and Vice-Governors of the Bank of Slovenia (on the proposal of the President of the Republic),
- members of the Court of Audit (on the proposal of the President of the Republic) and
- others, if set by law.

=== Elections ===
Date	Proposer	Position	Candidate	Voted	In favour	Against	Invalid	Comments
1 August 2014	31 MPs, first signatory Miro Cerar (SMC)	Speaker	Milan Brglez (SMC)	86	66	1	19	secret ballot
25 August 2014	President of the Republic Borut Pahor	Prime Minister	Miro Cerar (SMC)	69	57	11	1	secret ballot
25 August 2014	49 MPs, first signatory Matjaž Han (SD)	Deputy-Speaker	Janko Veber (SD)	87	59	9	19	secret ballot
25 August 2014	49 MPs, first signatory Franc Jurša (DeSUS)	Deputy-Speaker	Primož Hainz (DeSUS)	87	56	25	6	secret ballot
25 August 2014	Council of the Speaker	Secretary-General of the NA	Uršula Zore Tavčar	85	65	0	/	public voting
18 September 2014	Prime Minister Miro Cerar (SMC)	Minister of the Interior	Vesna Györkös Žnidar (SMC)	85	54	25	/	public voting
18 September 2014	Prime Minister Miro Cerar (SMC)	Minister of Foreign Affairs	Karl Erjavec (DeSUS)	85	54	25	/	public voting
18 September 2014	Prime Minister Miro Cerar (SMC)	Minister of Finance	Dušan Mramor (SMC)	85	54	25	/	public voting
18 September 2014	Prime Minister Miro Cerar (SMC)	Minister of Infrastructure	Peter Gašperšič (SMC)	85	54	25	/	public voting
18 September 2014	Prime Minister Miro Cerar (SMC)	Minister of Education, Science and Sport	Stanka Setnikar Cankar (SMC)	85	54	25	/	public voting
18 September 2014	Prime Minister Miro Cerar (SMC)	Minister of Defence	Janko Veber (SD)	85	54	25	/	public voting
18 September 2014	Prime Minister Miro Cerar (SMC)	Minister of Economic Development and Technology	Jožef Petrovič (SMC)	85	54	25	/	public voting
18 September 2014	Prime Minister Miro Cerar (SMC)	Minister of Justice	Goran Klemenčič (SMC)	85	54	25	/	public voting
18 September 2014	Prime Minister Miro Cerar (SMC)	Minister of Public Administration	Boris Koprivnikar (SMC)	85	54	25	/	public voting
18 September 2014	Prime Minister Miro Cerar (SMC)	Minister of Health	Milojka Kolar Celarc (SMC)	85	54	25	/	public voting
18 September 2014	Prime Minister Miro Cerar (SMC)	Minister of Labour, Family, Social Affairs and Equal Opportunities	Anja Kopač Mrak (SD)	85	54	25	/	public voting
18 September 2014	Prime Minister Miro Cerar (SMC)	Minister of Culture	Julijana Bizjak Mlakar (DeSUS)	85	54	25	/	public voting
18 September 2014	Prime Minister Miro Cerar (SMC)	Minister of Agriculture, Forestry and Food	Dejan Židan (SD)	85	54	25	/	public voting
18 September 2014	Prime Minister Miro Cerar (SMC)	Minister of Environment and Spatial Planning	Irena Majcen (DeSUS)	85	54	25	/	public voting
18 September 2014	Prime Minister Miro Cerar (SMC)	Minister without portfolio for Slovenian diaspora	Gorazd Žmavc (DeSUS)	85	54	25	/	public voting
18 September 2014	Prime Minister Miro Cerar (SMC)	Minister without Portfolio responsible for Development, Strategic Projects and Cohesion	Violeta Bulc (SMC)	85	54	25	/	public voting
30 September 2014	Human Rights Ombudsman Vlasta Nussdorfer	Deputy Human Rights Ombudsman	Tonček Dolčič	75	54	15	/	public voting
30 September 2014	Human Rights Ombudsman Vlasta Nussdorfer	Deputy Human Rights Ombudsman	Jernej Rovšek	69	50	16	/	public voting
30 September 2014	45 MPs, first signatory Matjaž Han (SD)	Deputy-Speaker	Andreja Katič (SD)	74	60	1	13	secret ballot

== Composition of the executive ==
- President of the Republic: Borut Pahor (SD), since 22 December 2012
- Prime Minister: Miro Cerar (SMC), since 18 September 2014
  - 12th Government

=== Interpellations, votes of confidence, and charges before the Constitutional Court ===
==== Interpellations ====
According to the Article 118 of the Constitution at least 10 MPs can submit and interpellation against a minister or government as a whole.

Date	Proposer	Interpellated	Quorum	In favour	Against	Abstain	Comments
No interpellation has yet been submitted.

==== Votes of confidence ====
Prime Minister can, according to the Article 117 of the Constitution request a vote of confidence. If government does not win the vote of confidence, National Assembly has to elect new Prime Minister within 30 days. If it fails, President of the Republic dissolves the National Assembly and snap election takes place within 60 days.

Also, according to the Article 116 of the Constitution, 10 MPs can propose a vote of no confidence and at the same time propose a candidate for the new Prime Minister.

==== Charges before the Constitutional Court ====
Based on Articles 109 and 119 of the Constitution National Assembly can press charges against President of the Republic, Prime Minister or ministers before the Constitutional Court if they brake the Constitution or laws.

== Legislative services heads ==
- Secretary-General: Uršula Zore Tavčar
  - Head of the Secretariat and Deputy Secretary-General: Jerneja Bergoč
    - Head of29 the Sector for the activities of the National Assembly: Mojca Marn Čepuran
      - Head of the department for preparation of sessions of the National Assembly and working bodies:
      - Head of the department for international activity, protocol and translation: Tatjana Pandev
    - Head of the Research and documentation sector: Tatjana Krašovec
      - Head of the Research department: Igor Zobavnik
      - Head of the Documentation and Library Department: Vojka Vuk Dirnbek
  - Director and Deputy Secretary-General: Igor Ivančič
    - Head of the General sector: Anita Longo
      - Head of the Department of Organization and Staff: Sonja Nahtigal
      - Head of the Financial department: Rok Tomšič
    - Head of the Information sector:
      - Head of the Information Systems Development Department: Bojan Verbič
      - Head of the department for work with materials and mail: Gordana Černe
      - Head of the Department of Operations Service: Jela Jelič
      - Head of the department for printing: Iztok Potočnik
    - Head of the Operational-technical sector: Alenka Urbančič
      - Head of the Investment and Maintenance Department: Janez Gomboc
      - Head of the Catering Department: Verica Novaković
      - Head of the Department of Transportation: Ivo Paal
      - Head of the Department for Reception and Telephones: Anita Knez
- Services of the political groups
  - Expert assistance for the political groups
- Head of the Office of the President: Katarina Ratoša
- Head of the Legal Service: Nataša Voršič
- Head of the Public Relations Office: Karmen Uglešič
- Permanent Representative of the National Assembly to the European Parliament: Zvone Bergant
