= List of bills in the 8th National Assembly of the Republic of Slovenia =

List includes bills that were introduced in the 8th National Assembly.

== General ==
Bill can be submitted to the National Assembly by:

- the Government,
- MP,
- National Council or
- 5,000 voters.

Legislative procedure begins when Speaker passes bill to the MPs.

There are 3 possible legislative procedures:

- regular legislative procedure,
- shortened legislative procedure or
- urgent legislative procedure.

Bills are usually passed with the majority of the present MPs. If the Constitution demands a two thirds majority (laws regulating electoral systems, referendums and constitutional laws which amend the Constitution) then at least 60 MPs have to vote in favor of the bill to pass it.

== Legend ==
Enacted into law

Acronyms for Ministries:

Ministry	Acronym
Government	G
Ministry of Finance	MF
Ministry of Public Administration	MJU
Ministry of Health	MZ
Ministry of Foreign Affairs	MZZ
Ministry of Agriculture, Forestry and Food	MKGP
Ministry of the Interior	MNZ
Ministry of Defence	MO
Ministry of Economic Development and Technology	MGRT
Ministry of Justice	MP
Ministry of Labour, Family, Social Affairs and Equal Opportunities	MDDSZEM
Ministry of Education, Science and Sport	MIZŠ
Ministry of Infrastructure	MI
Ministry of Culture	MK
Ministry of the Environment and Spatial Planning	MOP

== Bills proposed by the government ==
Full list of the bills is available on the National Assembly website.

#	EPA	Slovenian title	Acronym	Introduced		Legislative procedure	Quorum	In favor	Against	Description
1	0016-VIII	Zakon o dopolnitvi Zakona o zdravniški službi	ZZdrS-E	28 June 2018	G, MZ	urgent	77	48	12	Allowing to employ physicians from the third countries (outside EU) more easily.
2	0042-VIII	Zakon za zaščito vrednosti kapitalske naložbe Republike Slovenije v Novi Ljubljanski banki d.d., Ljubljana	ZVKNNLB	16 July 2018	G, MF	urgent	74	59	11	Protecting NLB from verdicts of Croatian courts against NLB.
3	0062-VIII	Zakon o trgu finančnih instrumentov	ZTFI-1	27 July 2018	G, MF	urgent				Implementing Regulations of the European Parliament and of the Council 2014/65/EU, 600/2014 and 2016/1011 and delegated regulation of the Commission 2017/593.
4	0063-VIII	Zakon o spremembah in dopolnitvah Zakona o investicijskih skladih in družbah za upravljanje	ZISDU-3C	27 July 2018	G, MF	urgent				Implementing Regulations of the European Parliament and of the Council 600/2014, 648/2012 and 2016/1011, delegated regulation of the Commission 2017/593 and Directive MiFID II.
5	0066-VIII	Zakon o spremembah in dopolnitvah Zakona o upravljavcih alternativnih investicijskih skladov	ZUAIS-A	27 July 2018	G, MF	urgent				Implementing Directive MiFID II, Regulations of the European Parliament and of the Council 600/2014 and 2016/1011 and delegated regulation of the Commission 2017/593

== Bills proposed by MPs ==
#	EPA	Slovenian title	Acronym	Introduced		Legislative procedure	Quorum	In favor	Against	Description
1	0119-VIII	Zakon o spremembah Zakona o dohodnini	ZDoh-2T	6 September 2018	Group of MPs, first signatory Jožef Horvat	regular				
2	0117-VIII	Zakon o spremembah in dopolnitvah Zakona o zdravstvenem varstvu in zdravstvenem zavarovanju	ZZVZZ-N	6 September 2018	Group of MPs, first signatory Jožef Horvat	regular				
3	0121-VIII	Zakon o spremembah in dopolnitvah Zakona o pokojninskem in invalidskem zavarovanju	ZPIZ-2F	11 September 2018	Group of MPs, first signatory Jožef Horvat	regular				
4	0122-VIII	Zakon o spremembi Zakona o delovnih razmerjih	ZDR-1B	11 September 2018	Group of MPs, first signatory Jožef Horvat	regular				

== Bills proposed by the National Council ==
#	EPA	Slovenian title	Acronym	Introduced	Legislative procedure	Quorum	In favor	Against	Description
1	0029-VIII	Zakon o spremembah in dopolnitvah Zakona o stvarnem premoženju države in samoupravnih lokalnih skupnosti	ZSPDSLS-1A	5 July 2018	shortened				
2	0163-VIII	Zakon o dopolnitvi Zakona o voznikih	ZVoz-1B	13 September 2018	regular				
3	0164-VIII	Zakon o spremembah in dopolnitvah Gradbenega zakona	GZ-A	13 September 2018	shortened				

== Bills proposed by voters ==
No bills yet.
