= Tomaž Lisec =

Slovenian politician (born 1978)

Member of the National Assembly
- Incumbent
- Assumed office 21 December 2011
- Constituency: Novo Mesto – Sevnica

Personal details
- Born: 19 February 1978 (age 48)
- Party: Slovenian Democratic Party

Tomaž Lisec (born 19 February 1978) is a Slovenian politician serving as a member of the National Assembly since 2011. He has been a municipal councillor of Sevnica since 2006.
