= Irena Vodopivec Jean =

Slovenian economist and banker

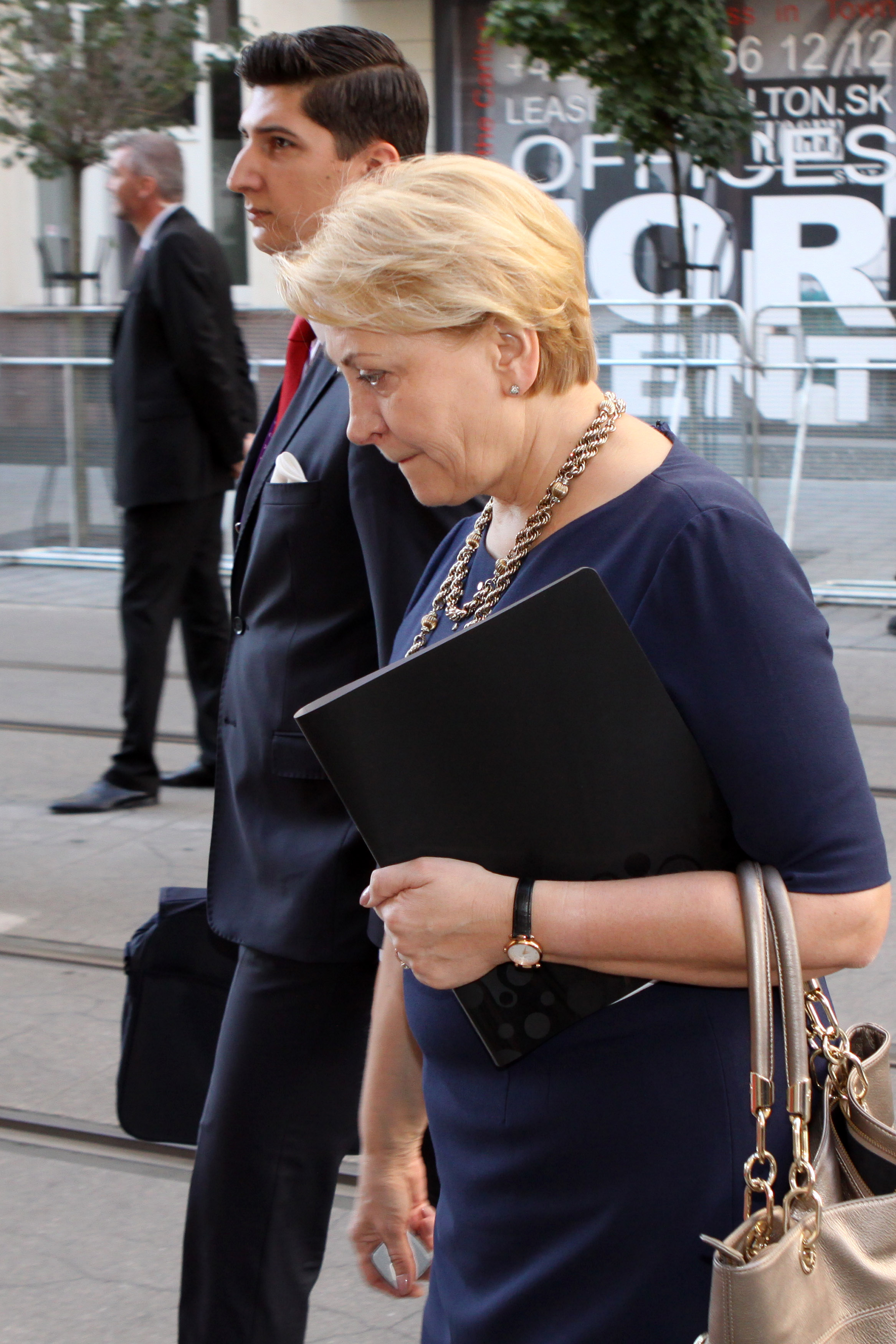
- Jean at an Informal Meeting of Ministers for Economic and Financial Affairs (2016)
- Born: Slovenia
- Education: University of Ljubljana
- Occupations: Economist and central banker
- Known for: Vice governor of the Bank of Slovenia

Irena Vodopivec Jean is a Slovenian economist and central banker. She has assumed positions of increasing responsibility with the central bank of Slovenia, the Bank of Slovenia and the Slovenian Ministry of Finance.

== Early life and education ==
Jean received a master's degree in banking from the Faculty of Social Sciences in 2007 at the University of Ljubljana. Her thesis was titled, State Aid Control in Slovenia.

== Career ==
She began working as a graduate economist in 1991 at the Chamber of Commerce and Industry. There, she was tasked with preparing economic analyses and negotiation materials. Three years later, she joined the Bank of Slovenia as a consultant and analyst. From 1999 to 2002, she worked as an advisor in banking supervision at the Bank of Slovenia before moving on to the Ministry of Finance. Between 2002 and 2006, she was the deputy head of the sector for monitoring state aid. Then she was promoted to head of the sector for the financial system, and in 2007 she became the Director General of the Directorate for the Financial System and took over the sector for international financial relations, working with the World Bank and International Monetary Fund.

According to a published article by Jenko, Jean supervised a financial institution called Abanka from 2006 to 2009 "at a time when it granted – as it later turned out – several hundred million worth of bad loans, and the state had to support it with a substantial financial injection last year [in 2014]. She herself now rejects the accusations and responds that she 'carefully and responsibly supervised Abanka.'"

In 2011, after nine years with the Ministry of Finance, Jean left to go to work for the Association of Banks of Slovenia, becoming its deputy director. In a 2015 vote, the National Assembly approved a proposal of President Borut Pahor that Jean, then the deputy director of the Association of Banks of Slovenia, become the new vice governor of the Bank of Slovenia, replacing Janez Fabijan on the bank's board.

=== Early resignation ===
In June 2022, Jean resigned from her position of vice governor for personal reasons, writing to the National Assembly that, "Life is unpredictable, and circumstances have arisen in my personal life that have led me to decide not to continue my intensive work at the Bank of Slovenia."

On 18 December 2024, Jean joined a meeting between the Delegation of the Council of Europe Congress of Local and Regional Authorities and the Slovenian Court of Audit. Jean was listed as an advisor to the President. The participants at the meeting discussed the financing of local governments and reviewed the recommendations proposed by the Congress in 2018 regarding local democracy in Slovenia.
