= Anja Bah Žibert =

Slovenian politician

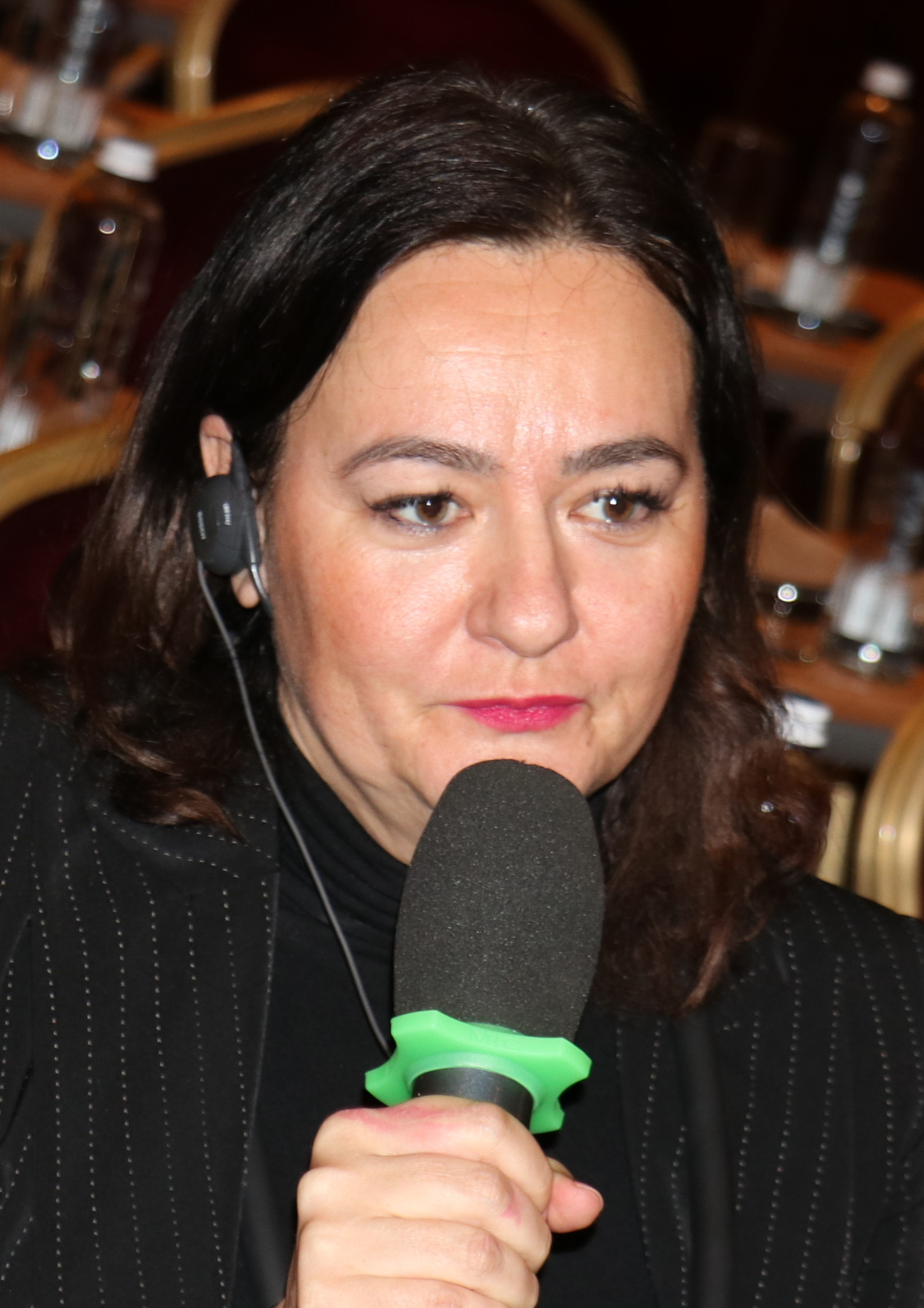
- Anja Bah Žibert, in 2019

Member of the National Assembly
- Incumbent
- Assumed office 2014

Personal details
- Born: 27 June 1973 (age 52) Koper, Slovenia
- Party: Slovenian Democratic Party – SDS

Anja Bah Žibert (born 27 June 1973) is a Slovenian politician, currently serving as member of the Slovenian National Assembly.
