= Matjaž Han =

Slovenian politician (born 1971)

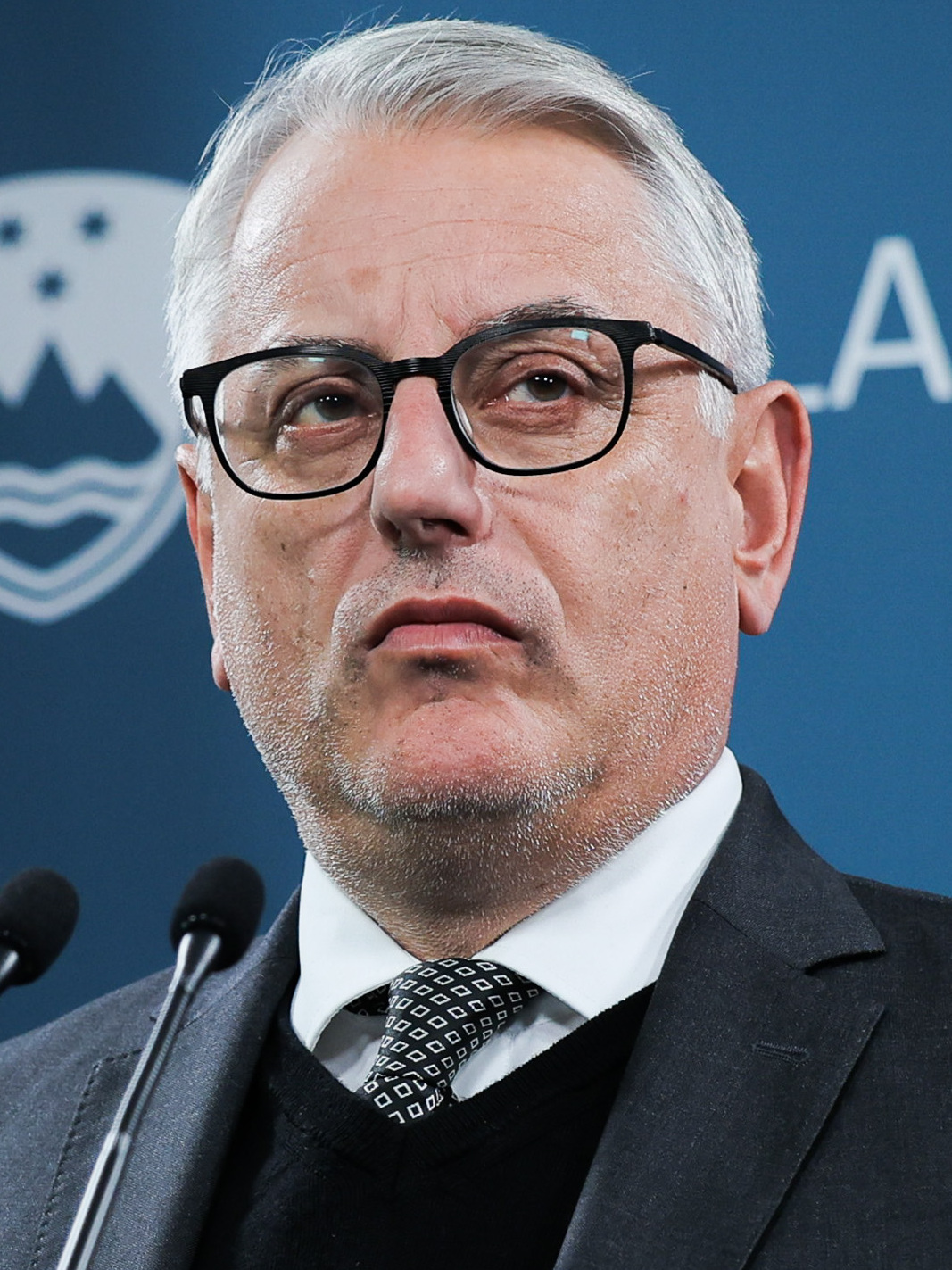
- Han in 2025

Minister of the Economy, Tourism and Sport
- In office 1 June 2022 – 4 June 2026
- Prime Minister: Robert Golob

Mayor of the Municipality of Radeče
- In office 2006–2011

Personal details
- Born: 17 January 1971 (age 55) Celje, SR Slovenia, SFR Yugoslavia

Matjaž Han (born 17 January 1971) is a Slovenian politician. He currently serves as the Minister of Economy, Tourism and Sport since 1 June 2022. Prior to his appointment as minister, he was a Member of the National Assembly of the Republic of Slovenia since 2004 and a long-time leader of the Social Democrats' parliamentary group. He was elected as President of the Social Democrats in April 2024.

== Early life and career ==
He attended the Secondary Trade and Commercial School in Celje. He co-founded the family company M and M international with his father and worked as its director between 1992 and 2004. In 2006, he became the mayor of the municipality of Radeče. In 2010, he was re-elected mayor.

In the 2011, parliamentary elections, he ran on the Social Democrats platform; with the confirmation of his parliamentary mandate, his mayoral function automatically ended. In 2013, he became the leader of the Social Democrats' parliamentary group and served in the National Assembly until 2022. He was member of the Committee on Economy and Committee on Internal Policy, Public Administration and Justice of the National Assembly of Slovenia. He was appointed Minister of Economic Development and Technology in the 15th Government of Slovenia on 1 June 2022 by Robert Golob. On January 24, 2023, following a government reorganization, his position was renamed to Minister of the Economy, Tourism and Sport.
