= List of speakers of the National Assembly of Slovenia =

List of speakers of the National Assembly of Slovenia.

The speaker of the National Assembly of Slovenia (Slovene: Predsednik Državnega zbora Republike Slovenije, literally the president of the National Assembly of the Republic of Slovenia) is the presiding officer of that legislature.

Below is a list of office-holders:

== Socialist Republic of Slovenia (within Yugoslavia) ==
No.	Portrait	Name	Term of office		Party
Speaker of the Slovenian People's Liberation Council
1		Josip Vidmar	1944	1946	ZKS
Speaker of the Constituent Assembly of the Socialist Republic of Slovenia
1		Ferdo Kozak	1946	1947	Ind
Speakers of the National Assembly of the Socialist Republic of Slovenia
1		Ferdo Kozak	1947	1953	Ind
2		Miha Marinko	1953	1962	ZKS
3		Vida Tomšič	1962	1963	ZKS
4		Ivan Maček	1963	1967	ZKS
5		Sergej Kraigher	1967	1973	ZKS
6		Marijan Brecelj	1974	1978	ZKS
7		Milan Kučan	1978	1982	ZKS
8		Vinko Hafner	1982	1986	ZKS
9		Miran Potrč	1986	1990	ZKS

== Republic of Slovenia (independent country) ==
No.	Portrait	Name	Term of office		Party
Speaker of the Constitutional National Assembly of the Republic of Slovenia
1		France Bučar	9 May 1990	23 December 1992	SDZ
Speakers of the National Assembly of the Republic of Slovenia
2		Herman Rigelnik	23 December 1992	14 September 1994	LDS
—		Miroslav Mozetič (acting)	14 September 1994	16 September 1994	SKD
3		Jožef Školč	16 September 1994	3 December 1996	LDS
4		Janez Podobnik	3 December 1996	27 October 2000	SLS
5		Borut Pahor	10 November 2000	9 July 2004	SD
—		Valentin Pohorec (acting)	9 July 2004	12 July 2004	DeSUS
6		Feri Horvat	12 July 2004	22 October 2004	SD
7		France Cukjati	22 October 2004	15 October 2008	SDS
8		Pavel Gantar	15 October 2008	2 September 2011	Zares
—		Vasja Klavora (acting)	2 September 2011	2 September 2011	DeSUS
9		Ljubo Germič	2 September 2011	21 December 2011	LDS
10		Gregor Virant	21 December 2011	28 January 2013	DL
—		Jakob Presečnik (acting)	28 January 2013	27 February 2013	SLS
11		Janko Veber	27 February 2013	1 August 2014	SD
12		Milan Brglez	1 August 2014	22 June 2018	SMC
13		Matej Tonin	22 June 2018	23 August 2018	NSi
—		Tina Heferle (acting)	23 August 2018	23 August 2018	LMŠ
14		Dejan Židan	23 August 2018	3 March 2020	SD
—		Branko Simonovič (acting)	3 March 2020	5 March 2020	DeSUS
15		Igor Zorčič	5 March 2020	13 May 2022	SMC
16		Urška Klakočar Zupančič	13 May 2022	10 April 2026	GS
17		Zoran Stevanović	10 April 2026	Incumbent	Resni.ca

== See also ==
- National Assembly (Slovenia)
