= Janko Veber =

Slovenian politician

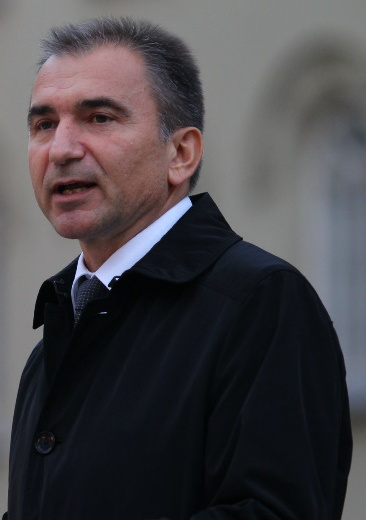

Speaker of the National Assembly of Slovenia
- In office 27 February 2013 – 1 August 2014
- Preceded by: Gregor Virant
- Succeeded by: Milan Brglez

Personal details
- Born: 30 July 1960 (age 66) Ljubljana, Yugoslavia
- Party: Social Democrats
- Education: University of Ljubljana
- Profession: Politician

Janko Veber (born 30 July 1960 in Ljubljana) is a Slovenian politician.

Veber studied civil engineering at the University of Ljubljana. Then he moved to Kočevje, where he was elected mayor and served three terms, from 1994 to 2010. In 1996, he was elected member of the National Assembly as a member of Social Democrats.

In February 2013, Veber was elected Speaker of the National Assembly, following the resignation of Gregor Virant from this position earlier in January. After the 2014 elections, he became Minister of Defence.

Political offices
Preceded by Gregor Virant	Speaker of the National Assembly of Slovenia; 2013 – 2014	Succeeded by Milan Brglez
