= Matej Tonin =

Slovenian politician

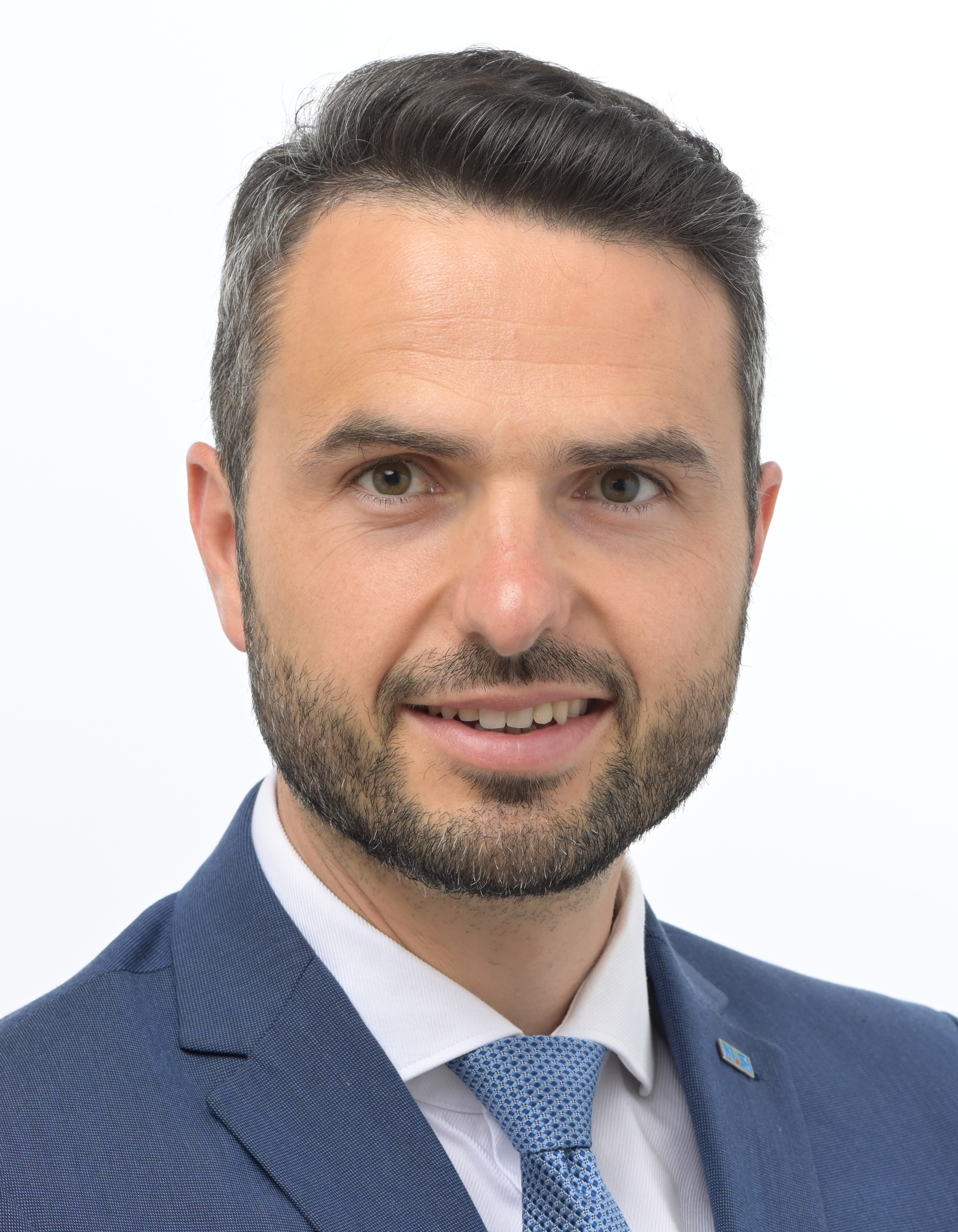
- Official portrait, 2024

Member of the European Parliament for Slovenia
- Incumbent
- Assumed office 16 July 2024

Member of the National Assembly
- In office 21 December 2011 – 15 July 2024

Minister of Defence
- In office 13 March 2020 – 1 June 2022
- President: Borut Pahor
- Prime Minister: Janez Janša
- Preceded by: Karl Erjavec
- Succeeded by: Marjan Šarec

Speaker of the National Assembly
- In office 22 June 2018 – 23 August 2018
- Preceded by: Milan Brglez
- Succeeded by: Dejan Židan

Personal details
- Born: 30 July 1983 (age 43)
- Party: Slovenia: New Slovenia; EU: European People's Party
- Education: University of Ljubljana
- Occupation: Political scientist • Politician

Matej Tonin (born 30 July 1983) is a Slovenian politician.

Tonin graduated from political sciences at the University of Ljubljana in 2007. A member of the New Slovenia (NSi) party, he was seen as one of the key people that helped the party win seats in the 2011 parliamentary election, having been absent in the 2008–2011 assembly. Tonin was also elected an MP in the 2014 and 2018 election.

In January 2018, Ljudmila Novak announced her resignation as the president of NSi and Tonin took over the party.

On 22 June 2018 Tonin was elected 13th Speaker of the National Assembly. Following the formation of the coalition around Marjan Šarec, Tonin stepped down on 23 August 2018 to be replaced by Dejan Židan of Social Democrats.

On 13 March 2020, Tonin became the Minister of Defence in the 14th Government of Slovenia.

On 9 June 2024, Tonin was elected to become a MEP on the 2024 European Parliament election when his party NSi remained with its 1-seat after receiving 7.66% of the national vote. Tonin gained the seat as the lead candidate of his party, earning the seat from his colleague, the previous MEP for NSi, Ljudmila Novak.

In the European Parliament, Tonin is part of the EPP parliamentary group.

Political offices
Preceded by Ljudmila Novak	Member of the European Parliament; 2024	Succeeded by Incumbent
