= Dejan Židan =

Slovenian politician

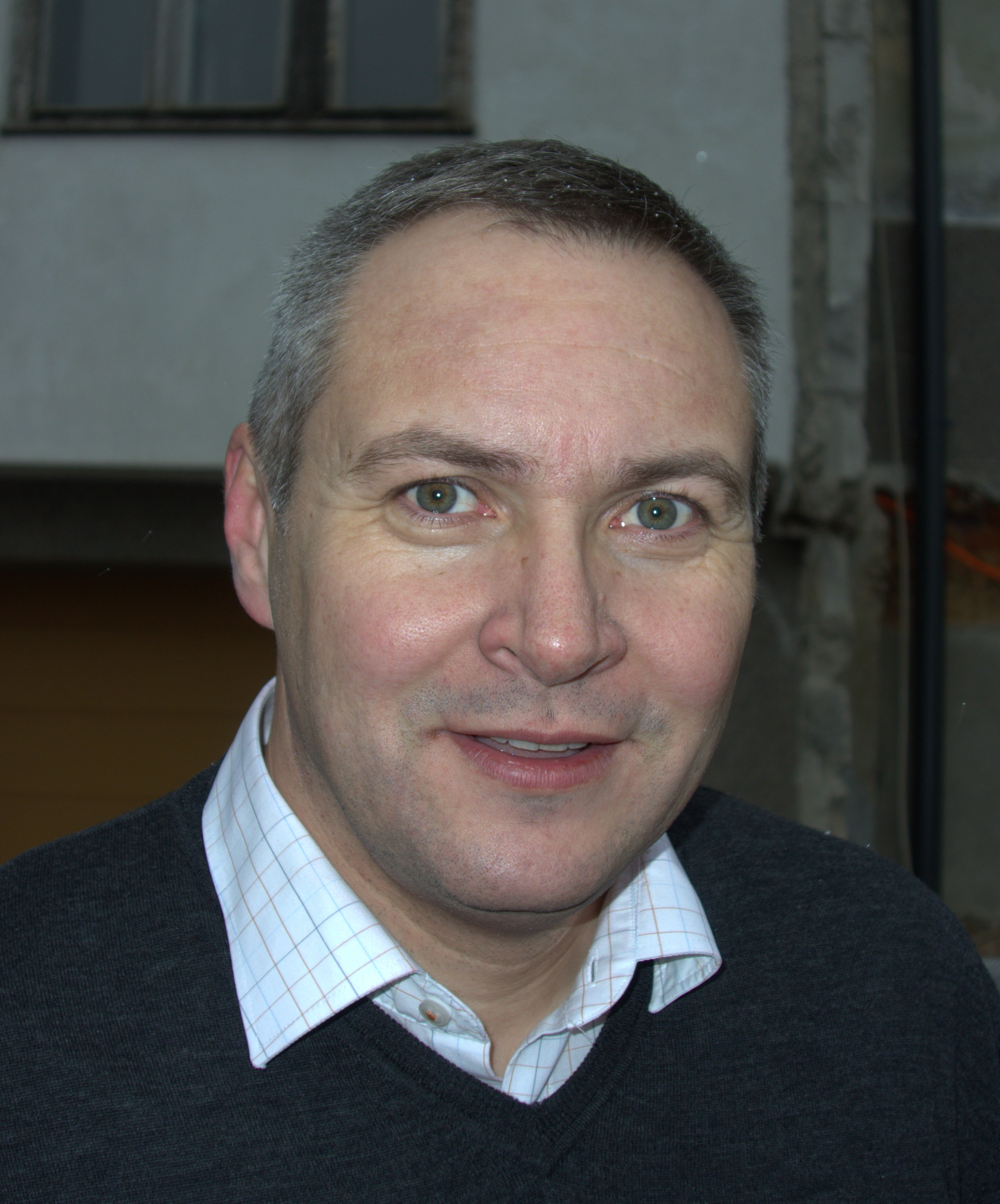
- Židan in 2018

Speaker of the National Assembly of Slovenia
- In office 23 August 2018 – 3 March 2020
- Preceded by: Matej Tonin
- Succeeded by: Igor Zorčič

Member of the National Assembly of Slovenia
- Incumbent
- Assumed office 13 July 2014

Minister of Agriculture, Forestry and Food
- In office 5 May 2010 – August 2018

Personal details
- Born: 16 October 1967 (age 58) Maribor, Yugoslavia (now Slovenia)
- Party: Social Democrats
- Education: University of Ljubljana

Dejan Židan (pronounced [ˈdɛːjan ˈʒiːdan]) (born 16 October 1967) is a Slovenian politician, former leader of the Social Democrats, and the former speaker of the National Assembly of Slovenia.

A veterinarian by education, Židan served as minister of agriculture, forestry, and nutrition from 2010 in 2012 in Borut Pahor's government. In the 2011 parliamentary election, Židan was elected a member of the National Assembly. In 2013, Židan became minister of agriculture and the environment in Alenka Bratušek's government. In March 2014, Židan was named the most popular Slovenian politician in a public opinion poll. Following the European Parliament election, Židan replaced Igor Lukšič as acting president of the Social Democrats.

Party political offices
Preceded by Igor Lukšič	Leader of the Social Democrats; 2014–2020	Succeeded by Tanja Fajon
Preceded by Matej Tonin	Speaker of the National Assembly of Slovenia; 2018 – 2020	Incumbent
