= National Assembly (Slovenia) =

Lower house, Parliament of Slovenia

Coordinates: 46°03′06″N 14°30′05″E

National Assembly of the Republic of Slovenia Državni zbor Republike Slovenije
- 10th National Assembly

Type
- Type: Lower house

Leadership
- Speaker: Zoran Stevanović, Resni.ca since 10 April 2026

Structure
- Seats: 90
- Political groups: Government (4th Janša Cabinet) (43): SDS (28); SA (9) (Note: NSi (7); SLS (1); FOKUS (1)); Democrats (6); Supported by (7): Resni.ca (3); Hungarian and Italian national minorities (2); Katja Kokot and Aleksander Štorek (2); Opposition (40): GS (29); SD (6); The Left (5)

Elections
- Voting system: Open list proportional representation with a 4% election threshold
- First election: 8 April 1990
- Last election: 22 March 2026
- Next election: By 22 March 2030

Meeting place
- National Assembly Building, Ljubljana

Website
- https://www.dz-rs.si

A view of the building from across Republic Square

The National Assembly (Slovene: Državni zbor Republike Slovenije, pronounced [dəɾˈʒàːwni ˈzbɔ́ɾ ɾɛˈpúːblikɛ slɔˈʋèːnijɛ] or [-ˈzbɔ̀ːɾ-]; short form državni zbor) is the general representative body of Slovenia. According to the Constitution of Slovenia and the Constitutional Court of Slovenia, it is the major part of the distinctively incompletely bicameral Slovenian Parliament, the legislative branch of the Republic of Slovenia. It has 90 members, elected for a four-year term. 88 members are elected using the party-list proportional representation system and the remaining two, using the Borda count, by the Hungarian and Italian-speaking ethnic minorities, who have an absolute veto in matters concerning their ethnic groups.

As of April 2026, the 10th National Assembly of the Republic of Slovenia is in session.

== Legislative procedure ==
A bill can be submitted to the National Assembly by:

- the Government
- an MP
- the National Council
- 5,000 voters

The legislative procedure begins when the Speaker passes a bill to the MPs.

There are three possible legislative procedures:

- regular legislative procedure
- abbreviated legislative procedure
- urgent legislative procedure

Bills are normally passed by a majority of the present MPs. If the Constitution demands a two-thirds majority (laws regulating electoral systems, referendums and constitutional laws which amend the Constitution), then at least 60 of the 90 MPs must vote for the bill for passage.

=== Regular legislative procedure ===
==== First reading ====
The first reading is completed with passing the bill to the MPs by the Speaker, unless ten MPs request a session of the assembly within 15 days to discuss reasons why bill was submitted.

If the session is held, the assembly must vote on the resolution if the bill is appropriate for a further procedure.

The Speaker determines a working body that will discuss the bill in the further procedure. Other bodies can also discuss the bill if there is such interest, however they cannot vote on it.

==== Second reading ====
During the second reading bill is first discussed by the working body that can amend the bill and make a report on the bill which is the basis for the plenary of assembly. Working body discusses and votes on each article of the bill. Assembly later votes and discusses only the articles that were amended during the session of the working body.

Assembly and working body can accept a resolution that the bill is not appropriate for a further procedure if not such resolution was accepted during the first reading.

==== Third reading ====
In the third reading working body and assembly vote on the bill as a whole. If it is accepted the bill is sent to the President to sign it.

=== Shortened legislative procedure ===
During shortened legislative procedure there is no first reading and the second and third readings are held at the same session.

It can be applied for a bills that regulate minor matters, another law is abolished with the bill, if national laws have to be harmonised with Acquis communautaire or when bill regulates procedures before the Constitutional Court or Constitutional Court order changes of the laws.

=== Urgent legislative procedure ===
Bill can be passed under urgent procedure if it is important for the security or defence of the country, if it is addressing the consequences of natural disasters or it is proposed to prevent irreversible consequences for the country.

There is no first reading, the second and third readings are held at the same session, amendments to the bill can be given orally and timeline of the procedure is shorter.

=== Suspensive veto ===
Upon passage of a bill, the National Council can (within two weeks) veto it. An absolute majority of the National Assembly is required to override the veto.

== List of speakers of the National Assembly ==
1. France Bučar (SDZ): 9 May 1990 – 23 December 1992
2. Herman Rigelnik (LDS): 23 December 1992 – 14 September 1994
-- Miroslav Mozetič (acting) (SKD): 14 September 1994 - 16 September 1994
3. Jožef Školč (LDS): 16 September 1994 – 3 December 1996
4. Janez Podobnik (SLS): 3 December 1996 – 27 October 2000
5. Borut Pahor (ZLSD): 10 November 2000 – 9 July 2004
-- Valentin Pohorec (acting) (DeSUS): 9–12 July 2004
6. Feri Horvat (ZLSD): 12 July 2004 – 22 October 2004
7. France Cukjati (SDS): 22 October 2004 – 15 October 2008
8. Pavel Gantar (Zares): 15 October 2008 – 2 September 2011
-- Vasja Klavora (acting) (DeSUS): 2 September 2011
9. Ljubo Germič (LDS): 2 September 2011 – 21 December 2011
10. Gregor Virant (LGV/DL): 21 December 2011 – 28 January 2013
-- Jakob Presečnik (acting) (SLS): 28 January 2013 – 27 February 2013
11. Janko Veber (SD): 27 February 2013 – 1 August 2014
12. Milan Brglez (SMC): 1 August 2014 – 22 June 2018
13. Matej Tonin (NSi): 22 June 2018 – 23 August 2018
-- Tina Heferle (acting) (LMŠ): 23 August 2018
14. Dejan Židan (SD): 23 August 2018 – 3 March 2020
-- Branko Simonovič (acting) (DeSUS): 3 March 2020 - 5 March 2020
15. Igor Zorčič (SMC): 5 March 2020 - 13 May 2022
16. Urška Klakočar Zupančič (GS): 13 May 2022 - 10 April 2026
17. Zoran Stevanović (Resni.ca): 10 April 2026 - (incumbent)

== Electoral system ==
The 90 members of the National Assembly are elected by two methods. 88 are elected by open list proportional representation in eight 11-seat constituencies and seats are allocated to the parties at the constituency level using the Droop quota. The elected Deputies are identified by ranking all of a party's candidates in a constituency by the percentage of votes they received in their district. The seats that remain unallocated are allocated to the parties at the national level using the d'Hondt method with an electoral threshold of 4%. Although the country is divided into 88 electoral districts, deputies are not elected from all 88 districts. More than one deputy is elected in some districts, which results in some districts not having an elected deputy (for instance, 21 of 88 electoral districts did not have an elected deputy in the 2014 elections). Parties must have at least 35% of their lists from each gender, except in cases where there are only three candidates. For these lists, there must be at least one candidate of each gender.

Two additional deputies are elected by the Italian and Hungarian minorities. Voters rank all of the candidates on the ballot paper using numbers (1 being highest priority). A candidate is awarded the most points (equal to the number of candidates on the ballot paper) when a voter ranks them first. The candidate with most points wins.

== History ==
The pre-1992 legislature of the Socialist Republic of Slovenia had a tricameral structure, comprising a Socio-Political Assembly, a Municipalities' Assembly, and an Assembly of United Labor. The National Assembly is the successor of the 1974-1990 Socio-Political Assembly.

Between 1947 and 1974, Slovenia (as a constituent of Yugoslavia) had a universal-suffrage assembly dominated by the League of Communists of Slovenia. This was initially a unicameral legislature, but was converted into a house in 1953, when the Assembly was made bicameral. Of the two houses ("zbor", usually also translated as "assembly"), the generally-representative one was the Assembly of the Republic (republiški zbor). This was later supplemented with four other houses in 1963, before being reduced to two in 1968.

The 1974 Yugoslav Constitution abolished the Assembly of the Republic altogether. Its competencies were transferred to the Socio-Political Assembly - a relatively small body, with only 50 delegates. Unlike the Assembly of the Republic, nominally elected by universal suffrage, the Socio-Political Assembly was an explicitly partisan body: its seats (ten each) were formally allocated to the League of Communists of Slovenia (ZKS) and four of its subsidiary organizations: the League of Socialist Youth of Slovenia (ZSMS), the Socialist League of the Working People of Slovenia (SZDLS), the League of Trade Unions, and the Association of Veterans of the Slovenian National Liberation War. Socio-Political Assembly delegates were elected indirectly, in Soviet-style single-candidate approval votes held by lower-level socio-political assemblies of individual municipalities.

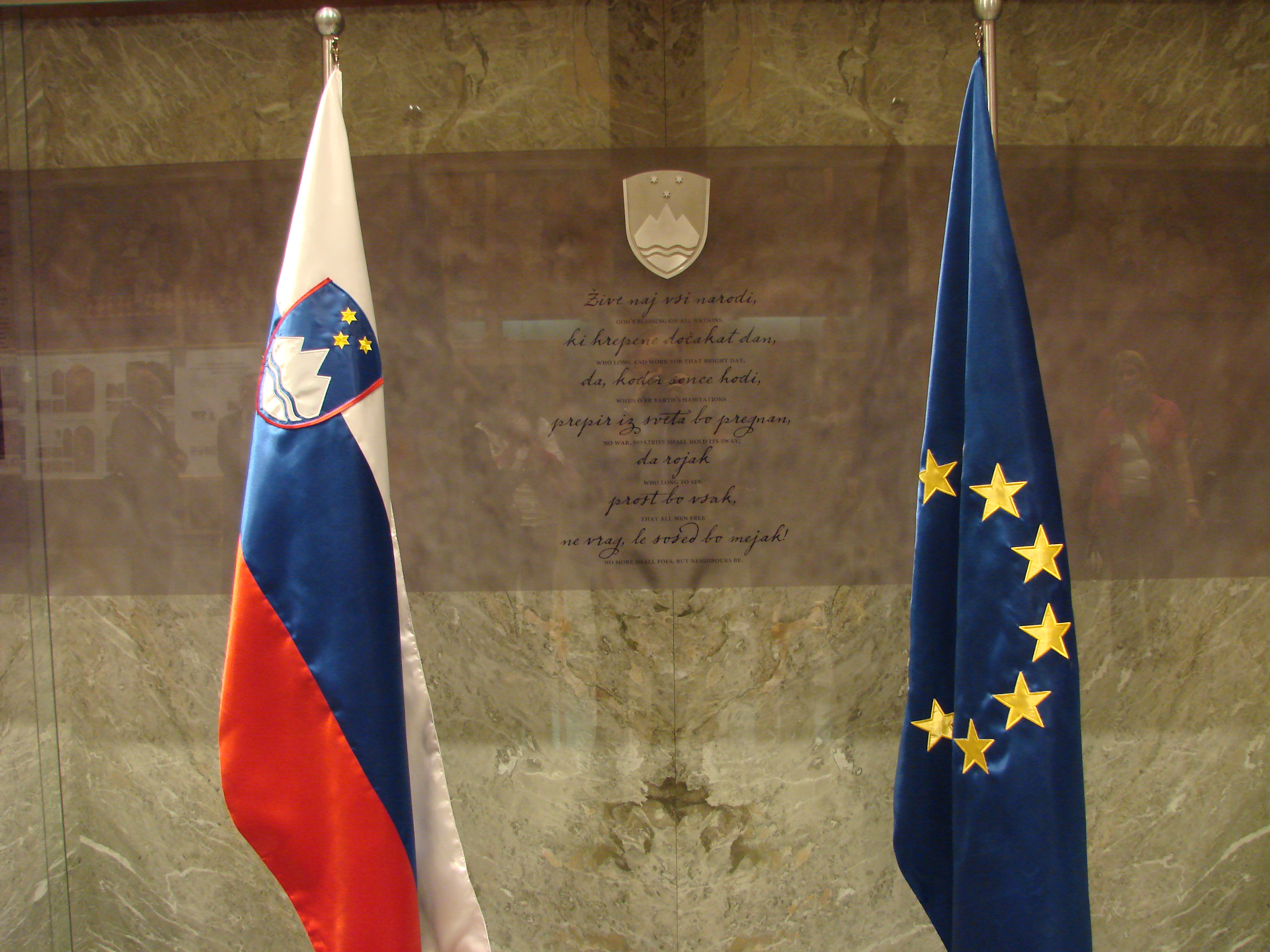
Slovenian anthem text in the lobby of NA.

== Latest election ==
Party	Votes	%	Seats	+/–
Freedom Movement	338,102	28.66	29	–12
Slovenian Democratic Party	328,923	27.88	28	+1
Together in Action	109,201	9.26	9	+1
Social Democrats	79,175	6.71	6	–1
Democrats	78,902	6.69	6	New
Levica and Vesna	67,183	5.69	5	0
Resni.ca	64,799	5.49	5	+5
Prerod – Party of Vladimir Prebilič	35,976	3.05	0	New
Pirate Party	27,811	2.36	0	0
Slovenian National Party	26,375	2.24	0	0
We, Socialists!	5,657	0.48	0	New
Greens of Slovenia and Party of Generations	5,277	0.45	0	0
Alternative for Slovenia	4,785	0.41	0	0
Voice of Pensioners	4,193	0.36	0	New
Karl Erjavec – Trust Party	2,995	0.25	0	New
Unity	251	0.02	0	0
Solution – Party of Pensioners Velenje	164	0.01	0	New
Italian and Hungarian national minorities			2	0
Total	1,179,769	100.00	90	0
Valid votes	1,179,769	99.07		
Invalid/blank votes	11,050	0.93		
Total votes	1,190,819	100.00		
Registered voters/turnout	1,695,220	70.25		
Source: dvk-rs.si

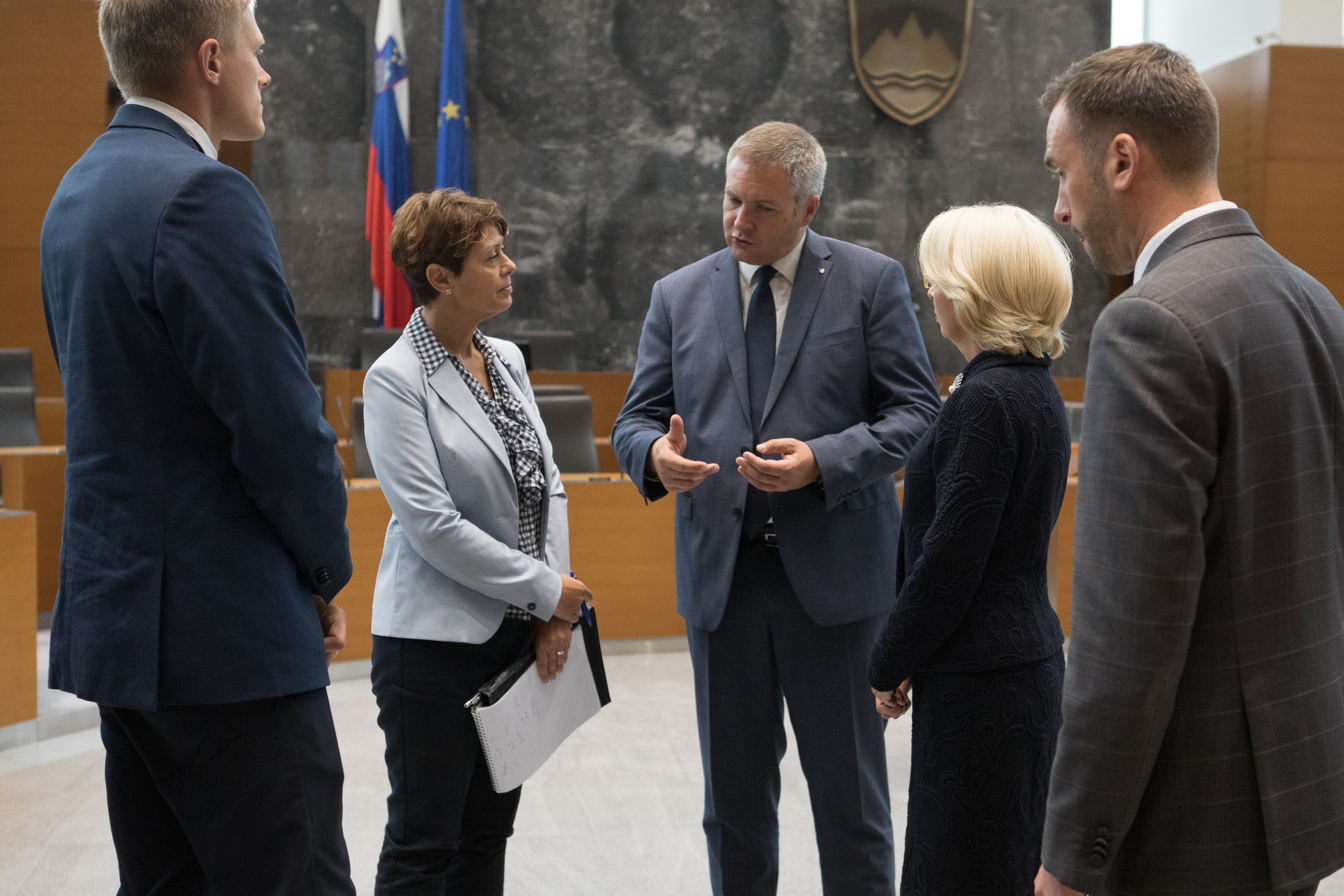
President of NA Dejan Židan (in the middle)

=== Elections of the representatives of national minorities ===
==== Italian national minority ====
Candidate	Votes	%
Felice Žiža	776	41.63
Alberto Scheriani	562	30.15
Christian Poletti	326	17.49
Stefano Destefano	200	10.73
Valid votes	1,864	98.11
Invalid/blank votes	33	1.89
Total	1,900	100.00
Registered voters/turnout	2,856	66.53
Source: Volitve

==== Hungarian national minority ====
Candidate	Points	%
Ferenc Horváth	2,209	72.71
Tomi Horvat	829	27.29
Valid votes	3,038	96.97
Invalid/blank votes	95	3.03
Total	3,133	100.00
Registered voters/turnout	5,384	58.19
Source: Volitve

== Historical composition of the Slovenian National Assembly ==
SSS / ZL/Levica / SMS / ZKS/ZLSD/SD / LZJ-PS / Zares / LDS / GS / SAB / LMŠ / SMC / DeSUS / LGV / SOS / DS / DEM / ZS / SKD / SDZ / N.Si / SLS / FOKUS / SDSS/SDS / SNS / Resni.ca / Minorities
1990	5 / 14 / 12 / 3 / 8 / 11 / 8 / 11 / 6 / 2
1992	14 / 22 / 6 / 5 / 15 / 10 / 4 / 12 / 2
1996	9 / 25 / 5 / 10 / 19 / 16 / 4 / 2
2000	4 / 11 / 34 / 4 / 8 / 9 / 14 / 4 / 2
2004	10 / 23 / 4 / 9 / 7 / 29 / 6 / 2
2008	29 / 9 / 5 / 7 / 5 / 28 / 5 / 2
2011	10 / 28 / 6 / 8 / 4 / 6 / 26 / 2
2014	6 / 6 / 4 / 36 / 10 / 5 / 21 / 2
2018	9 / 10 / 5 / 13 / 10 / 5 / 7 / 25 / 4 / 2
2022	5 / 7 / 41 / 8 / 27 / 2
2026	5 / 6 / 29 / 6 / 7 / 1 / 1 / 28 / 5 / 2

== Terms ==
- 1st National Assembly
- 2nd National Assembly
- 3rd National Assembly
- 4th National Assembly
- 5th National Assembly
- 6th National Assembly
- 7th National Assembly
- 8th National Assembly

== Members ==
- List of members of the 1st National Assembly of the Republic of Slovenia
- List of members of the 2nd National Assembly of the Republic of Slovenia
- List of members of the 3rd National Assembly of the Republic of Slovenia
- List of members of the 4th National Assembly of the Republic of Slovenia
- List of members of the 5th National Assembly of the Republic of Slovenia
- List of members of the 6th National Assembly of the Republic of Slovenia
- List of members of the 7th National Assembly of the Republic of Slovenia
- List of members of the 8th National Assembly of the Republic of Slovenia
