= Ptuj (National Assembly constituency) =

Constituency in Slovenia

- Constituency for the National Assembly
- Location of Ptuj within Slovenia
- Municipality: List: Apače; Beltinci; Benedikt; Cankova; Cerkvenjak; Cirkulane; Črenšovci; Destrnik; Dobronak; Dornava; Gorišnica; Gornja Radgona; Gornji Petrovci; Grad; Hajdina; Hodos; Juršinci; Kidričevo; Kobilje; Križevci; Kungota; Kuzma; Lenart; Lendava; Ljutomer; Majšperk; Markovci; Moravske Toplice; Murska Sobota; Odranci; Ormož; Pesnica; Podlehnik; Ptuj; Puconci; Radenci; Razkrižje; Rogašovci; Šalovci; Šentilj; Središče ob Dravi; Sveta Ana; Sveta Trojica v Slovenskih Goricah; Sveti Andraž v Slovenskih Goricah; Sveti Jurij ob Ščavnici; Sveti Jurij v Slovenskih Goricah; Sveti Tomaž; Tišina; Trnovska Vas; Turnišče; Velika Polana; Veržej; Videm; Zavrč; Žetale
- Population: 240,715 (2025)
- Electorate: 209,921 (2026)
- Area: 2,589 km^{2} (2024)

Current Constituency
- Created: 1992
- Seats: 11 (1992–present)
- Deputies: List: Franc Breznik (SDS); Matej Grah (Svoboda); Aleksander Gungl (NSi); Andrej Kosi (SDS); Jožef Lenart (SDS); Boris Mijič (Resni.ca); Luka Simonič (SDS); Dejan Süč (Svoboda); Sara Žibrat (Svoboda); Mojca Žnidarič (D); Damijan Zrim (SD)
- Electoral districts: List: Gornja Radgona; Lenart; Lendava; Ljutomer; Murska Sobota 1; Murska Sobota 2; Ormož; Pesnica; Ptuj 1; Ptuj 2; Ptuj 3

Ptuj, officially known as the 8th constituency (Slovene: 8. volilna enota), is one of the eight multi-member constituencies (electoral units) of the National Assembly, the national legislature of Slovenia. The constituency was established in 1992 following Slovenia's independence from Yugoslavia. It consists of the municipalities of Apače, Beltinci, Benedikt, Cankova, Cerkvenjak, Cirkulane, Črenšovci, Destrnik, Dobronak, Dornava, Gorišnica, Gornja Radgona, Gornji Petrovci, Grad, Hajdina, Hodos, Juršinci, Kidričevo, Kobilje, Križevci, Kungota, Kuzma, Lenart, Lendava, Ljutomer, Majšperk, Markovci, Moravske Toplice, Murska Sobota, Odranci, Ormož, Pesnica, Podlehnik, Ptuj, Puconci, Radenci, Razkrižje, Rogašovci, Šalovci, Šentilj, Središče ob Dravi, Sveta Ana, Sveta Trojica v Slovenskih Goricah, Sveti Andraž v Slovenskih Goricah, Sveti Jurij ob Ščavnici, Sveti Jurij v Slovenskih Goricah, Sveti Tomaž, Tišina, Trnovska Vas, Turnišče, Velika Polana, Veržej, Videm, Zavrč and Žetale. The constituency currently elects 11 of the 90 members of the National Assembly using the open party-list proportional representation electoral system. At the 2026 parliamentary election the constituency had 209,921 registered electors.

== History ==
The 8th constituency (Ptuj) was one of the eight constituencies established by the Determination of Constituencies for the Election of Deputies to the National Assembly Act (ZDVEDZ) (Zakon o določitvi volilnih enot za volitve poslancev v državni zbor (ZDVEDZ)) passed by the Assembly of the Republic of Slovenia (Skupščina Republike Slovenije) in September 1992. It consisted of the municipalities of Gornja Radgona, Lenart, Lendava, Ljutomer, Murska Sobota, Ormož, Pesnica and Ptuj.

Following the re-organisation of municipalities in October 1994, parts of Gornja Radgona municipality were transferred to the newly created municipalities of Radenci and Sveti Jurij; parts of Lendava municipality were transferred to the newly created municipalities of Črenšovci, Kobilje, Odranci and Turnišče; parts of Murska Sobota municipality were transferred to the newly created municipalities of Beltinci, Cankova–Tišina, Gornji Petrovci, Hodos–Sal, Kuzma, Moravske Toplice, Puconci and Rogašovci; parts of Pesnica municipality were transferred to the newly created municipalities of Kungota and Šentilj; and parts of Ptuj municipality were transferred to the newly created municipalities of Destrnik–Trnovska Vas, Dornava, Gorišnica, Juršinci, Kidričevo, Majšperk, Videm and Zavrč.

In August 1998 parts of Cankova–Tišina municipality were transferred to the newly created Tišina municipality whilst Cankova–Tišina was renamed Cankova; parts of Črenšovci municipality were transferred to the newly created Velika Polana municipality; parts of Destrnik–Trnovska Vas municipality were transferred to the newly created municipalities of Sveti Andraž v Slovenskih Goricah and Trnovska Vas whilst Destrnik–Trnovska Vas was renamed Destrnik; parts of Hodos–Sal municipality were transferred to the newly created Šalovci municipality whilst Hodos–Sal was renamed Hodos; parts of Kuzma municipality were transferred to the newly created Grad municipality; parts of Lenart municipality were transferred to the newly created municipalities of Benedikt, Cerkvenjak and Sveta Ana; parts of Lendava municipality were transferred to the newly created Dobronak municipality; parts of Ljutomer municipality were transferred to the newly created municipalities of Križevci, Razkrižje and Veržej; parts of Majšperk municipality were transferred to the newly created Žetale municipality; parts of Ptuj municipality were transferred to the newly created municipalities of Hajdina and Markovci; and parts of Videm municipality were transferred to the newly created Podlehnik.

In June 2006 parts of Gorišnica municipality were transferred to the newly created Cirkulane municipality; parts of Gornja Radgona municipality were transferred to the newly created Apače municipality; parts of Lenart municipality were transferred to the newly created municipalities of Sveta Trojica v Slovenskih Goricah and Sveti Jurij v Slovenskih Goricah; and parts of Ormož municipality were transferred to the newly created municipalities of Središče ob Dravi and Sveti Tomaž. Sveti Jurij municipality was renamed Sveti Jurij ob Ščavnici municipality in February 2011.

In February 2021 the National Assembly passed Amendments and Supplements to the Determination of Constituencies for the Election of Deputies to the National Assembly Act (ZDVEDZ-B) (Zakon o spremembah in dopolnitvah Zakona o določitvi volilnih enot za volitve poslancev v državni zbor (ZDVEDZ-B)) which defined the Ptuj constituency as consisting of the municipalities of Apače, Beltinci, Benedikt, Cankova, Cerkvenjak, Cirkulane, Črenšovci, Destrnik, Dobronak, Dornava, Gornja Radgona, Gornji Petrovci, Gorišnica, Grad, Hajdina, Hodos, Juršinci, Kidričevo, Kobilje, Križevci, Kuzma, Kungota, Lenart, Lendava, Ljutomer, Majšperk, Markovci, Moravske Toplice, Murska Sobota, Odranci, Ormož, Pesnica, Podlehnik, Puconci, Ptuj, Radenci, Razkrižje, Rogašovci, Šalovci, Šentilj, Središče ob Dravi, Sveti Tomaž, Sveta Ana, Sveta Trojica v Slovenskih Goricah, Sveti Andraž v Slovenskih Goricah, Sveti Jurij, Sveti Jurij v Slovenskih Goricah, Tišina, Trnovska Vas, Turnišče, Velika Polana, Veržej, Videm, Zavrč and Žetale.

== Electoral system ==
Ptuj currently elects 11 of the 90 members of the National Assembly using the open party-list proportional representation electoral system. Each constituency is divided into 11 electoral districts (volilni okraji) in which each party stands a single candidate. Electors vote for a candidate of their choice in their electoral district and then the votes received by each party's candidates are aggregated at the constituency level.

Allocation of seats was carried out in two stages. In the first stage, seats are allocated to parties at the constituency level using the Droop quota (Hare quota prior to 2006). In the second stage, unallocated seats from the first stage are aggregated at the national level and allocated to parties using the D'Hondt method (any seats won by the party at the constituency level are subtracted from the party's national seats). Though calculated nationally, national seats are allocated at the constituency level.

Since 2000, only parties that reach the 4% national threshold compete for seats at both constituency and national levels. Prior to this there was no threshold at the constituency level but parties needed to reach 3/88 (c3.4%) to compete for seats at the national level.

Seats won by each party in a constituency are allocated to the candidates with the highest percentage of votes. As a consequence, multiple candidates may be elected from an electoral district whilst others may have no candidates elected. Prior to 2000 parties had the option to have up to 50% of their national seats allocated in the order they appear on their party list (closed list).

== Electoral districts ==
Ptuj is divided into 11 electoral districts:

- 1. Lendava - municipalities of Črenšovci, Dobronak, Kobilje, Lendava, Odranci, Turnišče and Velika Polana.
- 2. Ormož - municipalities of Ormož, Središče ob Dravi and Sveti Tomaž.
- 3. Ljutomer - municipalities of Križevci, Ljutomer, Razkrižje and Veržej.
- 4. Murska Sobota 1 - municipalities of Cankova, Gornji Petrovci, Grad, Hodos, Kuzma, Moravske Toplice (except Bogojina, Bukovnica, Filovci, Ivanci, Lukačevci, Mlajtinci, Moravske Toplice, Suhi Vrh, Tešanovci and Vučja Gomila), Murska Sobota (Krog, Markišavci, Nemčavci and Satahovci only), Puconci, Rogašovci, Šalovci and Tišina.
- 5. Murska Sobota 2 - municipalities of Beltinci, Moravske Toplice (Bogojina, Bukovnica, Filovci, Ivanci, Lukačevci, Mlajtinci, Moravske Toplice, Suhi Vrh, Tešanovci and Vučja Gomila only) and Murska Sobota (except Krog, Markišavci, Nemčavci and Satahovci).
- 6. Gornja Radgona - municipalities of Apače, Gornja Radgona, Radenci and Sveti Jurij ob Ščavnici.
- 7. Lenart - municipalities of Benedikt, Cerkvenjak, Lenart, Sveta Ana, Sveti Jurij v Slovenskih Goricah and Sveta Trojica v Slovenskih Goricah.
- 8. Pesnica - municipalities of Kungota, Pesnica and Šentilj.
- 9. Ptuj 1 - municipalities of Destrnik, Dornava, Gorišnica, Juršinci, Markovci, Ptuj (except Spuhlja and parts of Ptuj), Sveti Andraž v Slovenskih Goricah and Trnovska Vas.
- 10. Ptuj 2 - municipalities of Hajdina and Ptuj (Spuhlja and parts of Ptuj only).
- 11. Ptuj 3 - municipalities of Cirkulane, Kidričevo, Majšperk, Podlehnik, Videm, Zavrč and Žetale.

== Election results ==
=== Summary ===
Election	Left Levica / ZL / TRS			Social Democrats SD / ZLSD / ZL			Freedom Movement Svoboda			Positive Slovenia PS / LZJ-PS			Liberal Democracy LDS			Let's Connect PoS / SMC			Slovenian People's SLS / SLS-SMS / SLS-SKD			Christian Democrats SKD			New Slovenia NSi			Slovenian Democrats SDS / SDSS			Slovenian Nationalists SNS		
Election	Votes	%	Seats	Votes	%	Seats	Votes	%	Seats	Votes	%	Seats	Votes	%	Seats	Votes	%	Seats	Votes	%	Seats	Votes	%	Seats	Votes	%	Seats	Votes	%	Seats	Votes	%	Seats
2026	4,333	3.16%	0	8,691	6.34%	0	38,130	27.82%	3										with NSi						11,807	8.62%	1	44,780	32.67%	3	3,080	2.25%	0
2022	4,168	3.06%	0	10,031	7.37%	0	40,990	30.12%	3							6,303	4.63%	0	with PoS						8,750	6.43%	0	39,475	29.01%	3	3,083	2.27%	0
2018	6,100	5.85%	0	11,517	11.04%	1										8,647	8.29%	0	3,859	3.70%	0				8,087	7.75%	0	29,446	28.22%	3	5,421	5.19%	0
2014	4,282	4.35%	0	8,282	8.41%	1				1,433	1.46%	0				29,314	29.77%	3	6,451	6.55%	0				5,615	5.70%	0	20,939	21.27%	2	3,746	3.80%	0
2011	1,246	0.99%	0	12,692	10.03%	1				21,087	16.67%	2	3,865	3.06%	0				17,100	13.52%	1				6,389	5.05%	0	35,195	27.83%	3	3,060	2.42%	0
2008				27,790	23.05%	2							8,933	7.41%	0				10,153	8.42%	1	674	0.56%	0	5,629	4.67%	0	38,270	31.75%	3	8,113	6.73%	0
2004				8,095	7.15%	0							24,870	21.97%	2				11,349	10.02%	1				12,903	11.40%	1	32,102	28.35%	3	6,164	5.44%	0
2000				10,708	8.54%	1							46,043	36.72%	4				15,636	12.47%	1	with SLS			12,146	9.69%	1	17,796	14.19%	1	4,876	3.89%	0
1996				6,478	5.21%	0							34,166	27.48%	3				29,248	23.52%	2	16,410	13.20%	1				16,798	13.51%	1	2,569	2.07%	0
1992				15,729	10.94%	1							27,905	19.41%	2				20,872	14.52%	1	25,265	17.57%	1				6,380	4.44%	0	4,677	3.25%	0

(Excludes national seats. Figures in italics represent alliances/joint lists.)

=== Detailed ===
Party has received at least 4% of the vote nationally (since 2000).

==== 2020s ====
===== 2026 =====
Results of the 2026 parliamentary election held on 22 March 2026:

Party		Votes per electoral district											Total votes	%	Seats		
Party		Gornja Radgona	Lenart	Lendava	Ljutomer	Murska Sobota 1	Murska Sobota 2	Ormož	Pesnica	Ptuj 1	Ptuj 2	Ptuj 3	Total votes	%	Con.	Nat.	Tot.
Slovenian Democratic Party	SDS	3,394	4,283	3,783	2,961	3,991	4,353	3,689	4,262	5,612	3,415	5,037	44,780	32.67%	3	1	4
Freedom Movement	Svoboda	3,338	2,533	3,894	3,031	4,700	5,470	2,389	3,403	3,306	3,056	3,010	38,130	27.82%	3	0	3
New Slovenia – Christian Democrats, Slovenian People's Party and Focus	NSi-SLS- FOKUS	871	1,362	1,183	693	1,024	1,153	678	753	1,578	978	1,534	11,807	8.62%	1	0	1
Democrats	D	833	786	888	763	948	1,030	906	686	1,219	858	922	9,839	7.18%	0	1	1
Resni.ca	Resni.ca	1,044	890	607	647	921	860	476	944	1,224	620	799	9,032	6.59%	0	1	1
Social Democrats	SD	726	439	504	487	2,071	1,592	353	580	669	672	598	8,691	6.34%	0	1	1
The Left and Vesna – Green Party	Levica-Vesna	448	325	379	333	423	682	190	358	357	539	299	4,333	3.16%	0	0	0
Slovenian National Party	SNS	263	233	169	220	327	266	392	276	370	223	341	3,080	2.25%	0	0	0
Prerod	Prerod	219	197	180	189	315	283	183	190	313	362	217	2,648	1.93%	0	0	0
Pirate Party	Pirati	164	190	206	135	194	286	120	223	218	222	179	2,137	1.56%	0	0	0
Greens of Slovenia and Party of Generations	ZS-SG	177	45	28	86	49	37	35	28	200	200	64	949	0.69%	0	0	0
Voice of Pensioners	GU	58	26	47	51	66	56	31	56	54	36	52	533	0.39%	0	0	0
We, Socialists!	MI!	42	19	38	40	30	56	15	39	39	42	30	390	0.28%	0	0	0
Karl Erjavec - Trust Party	SZ	34	24	38	58	59	37	18	29	24	24	22	367	0.27%	0	0	0
Alternative for Slovenia	AzaS	31	20	19	29	51	45	33	29	29	24	24	334	0.24%	0	0	0
Valid votes		11,642	11,372	11,963	9,723	15,169	16,206	9,508	11,856	15,212	11,271	13,128	137,050	100.00%	7	4	11
Rejected votes		102	100	122	75	139	123	77	77	133	98	135	1,181	0.85%			
Total polled		11,744	11,472	12,085	9,798	15,308	16,329	9,585	11,933	15,345	11,369	13,263	138,231	65.85%			
Registered electors		17,770	16,699	21,175	15,077	24,297	24,750	14,064	18,128	21,431	16,947	19,583	209,921				
Turnout		66.09%	68.70%	57.07%	64.99%	63.00%	65.98%	68.15%	65.83%	71.60%	67.09%	67.73%	65.85%				

The following candidates were elected:

- Constituency seats - Franc Breznik (SDS, Lenart), 4,283 votes; Matej Grah (Svoboda, Murska Sobota 2), 5,470 votes; Aleksander Gungl (NSi-SLS-FOKUS, Lenart), 1,362 votes; Andrej Kosi (SDS, Ormož), 3,689 votes; Suzana Lep Šimenko (SDS, Ptuj 3), 5,037 votes; Dejan Süč (Svoboda, Lendava), 3,894 votes; and Sara Žibrat (Svoboda, Ljutomer), 3,031 votes.
- National seats - Jožef Lenart (SDS, Ptuj 1), 5,612 votes; Boris Mijič (Resni.ca, Gornja Radgona), 1,044 votes; Mojca Žnidarič (D, Ormož), 906 votes; and Damijan Zrim (SD, Murska Sobota 1), 2,071 votes.

Substitutions:

- Suzana Lep Šimenko (SDS, Ptuj 3) forfeited her seat on 4 June 2026 upon being elected to the government and was replaced by Luka Simonič (SDS, Pesnica) on 9 June 2026.

===== 2022 =====
Results of the 2022 parliamentary election held on 24 April 2022:

Party		Votes per electoral district											Total votes	%	Seats		
Party		Gornja Radgona	Lenart	Lendava	Ljutomer	Murska Sobota 1	Murska Sobota 2	Ormož	Pesnica	Ptuj 1	Ptuj 2	Ptuj 3	Total votes	%	Con.	Nat.	Tot.
Freedom Movement	Svoboda	3,893	3,003	3,810	3,397	4,445	5,329	2,186	3,924	3,762	3,976	3,265	40,990	30.12%	3	2	5
Slovenian Democratic Party	SDS	2,814	3,630	3,778	2,647	3,932	3,954	2,893	3,527	4,918	3,050	4,332	39,475	29.01%	3	1	4
Social Democrats	SD	782	527	537	637	2,165	2,175	456	629	747	797	579	10,031	7.37%	0	1	1
New Slovenia – Christian Democrats	NSi	798	811	1,361	471	678	872	651	585	935	689	899	8,750	6.43%	0	1	1
Let's Connect Slovenia	PoS	489	447	297	345	680	955	673	243	1,137	325	712	6,303	4.63%	0	0	0
Resni.ca		445	400	352	286	556	415	211	554	569	323	388	4,499	3.31%	0	0	0
The Left	Levica	418	289	342	298	464	642	199	327	358	516	315	4,168	3.06%	0	0	0
List of Marjan Šarec	LMŠ	290	229	332	299	481	498	428	279	256	284	299	3,675	2.70%	0	0	0
Our Country		320	315	187	269	269	198	656	218	468	239	516	3,655	2.69%	0	0	0
Slovenian National Party	SNS	292	204	173	177	344	302	426	217	415	225	308	3,083	2.27%	0	0	0
Party of Alenka Bratušek	SAB	213	132	164	169	322	323	77	253	220	225	176	2,274	1.67%	0	0	0
For a Healthy Society	ZSi	189	196	149	172	137	239	118	137	223	252	159	1,971	1.45%	0	0	0
Our Future and Good Country	SNP-DD	218	112	171	109	130	194	147	132	200	126	166	1,705	1.25%	0	0	0
Pirate Party		187	133	149	120	144	235	80	148	157	158	127	1,638	1.20%	0	0	0
Democratic Party of Pensioners of Slovenia	DeSUS	165	91	124	189	233	123	68	86	88	62	120	1,349	0.99%	0	0	0
For the People of Slovenia	ZLS	73	59	50	81	75	79	137	131	100	101	126	1,012	0.74%	0	0	0
Vesna – Green Party		80	93	85	61	86	105	44	113	90	85	73	915	0.67%	0	0	0
Liberate Slovenia Alliance	ZOS	29	20	18	10	23	14	9	24	22	19	35	223	0.16%	0	0	0
List of Boris Popovič – Let's Digitize Slovenia	LBP	18	22	9	20	23	29	15	20	27	18	15	216	0.16%	0	0	0
Homeland League	DOM	19	8	19	9	16	13	5	18	10	12	13	142	0.10%	0	0	0
Valid votes		11,732	10,721	12,107	9,766	15,203	16,694	9,479	11,565	14,702	11,482	12,623	136,074	100.00%	6	5	11
Rejected votes		118	103	134	120	151	165	110	96	156	73	145	1,371	1.00%			
Total polled		11,850	10,824	12,241	9,886	15,354	16,859	9,589	11,661	14,858	11,555	12,768	137,445	65.13%			
Registered electors		17,863	16,338	21,398	15,208	24,689	25,086	14,290	17,937	21,444	17,082	19,707	211,042				
Turnout		66.34%	66.25%	57.21%	65.01%	62.19%	67.20%	67.10%	65.01%	69.29%	67.64%	64.79%	65.13%				

The following candidates were elected:

- Constituency seats - Franc Breznik (SDS, Lenart), 3,630 votes; Darko Krajnc (Svoboda, Pesnica), 3,924 votes; Jožef Lenart (SDS, Ptuj 1), 4,918 votes; Suzana Lep Šimenko (SDS, Ptuj 3), 4,332 votes; Jan Zaveck (Svoboda, Ptuj 2), 3,976 votes; and Sara Žibrat (Svoboda, Ljutomer), 3,397 votes.
- National seats - Vera Granfol (Svoboda, Gornja Radgona), 3,893 votes; Jožef Horvat (NSi, Lendava), 1,361 votes; Janez Magyar (SDS, Lendava), 3,778 votes; Tine Novak (Svoboda, Murska Sobota 2), 5,329 votes; and Damijan Zrim (SD, Murska Sobota 1), 2,165 votes.

Substitutions:

- Janez Magyar (SDS, Lendava) forfeited his seat on 23 December 2022 upon being elected Mayor of Lendava and was replaced by Andrej Kosi (SDS, Ormož) on 9 January 2023.
- Jan Zaveck (Svoboda, Ptuj 2) resigned on 18 September 2023 upon being elected Mayor of Lendava and was replaced by Dejan Süč (Svoboda, Lendava) on 20 September 2023.

==== 2010s ====
===== 2018 =====
Results of the 2018 parliamentary election held on 3 June 2018:

Party		Votes per electoral district											Total votes	%	Seats		
Party		Gornja Radgona	Lenart	Lendava	Ljutomer	Murska Sobota 1	Murska Sobota 2	Ormož	Pesnica	Ptuj 1	Ptuj 2	Ptuj 3	Total votes	%	Con.	Nat.	Tot.
Slovenian Democratic Party	SDS	2,186	2,697	2,772	1,840	3,103	2,880	2,062	2,861	3,406	2,374	3,265	29,446	28.22%	3	1	4
Social Democrats	SD	1,135	539	808	767	1,961	2,803	464	667	714	1,052	607	11,517	11.04%	1	0	1
List of Marjan Šarec	LMŠ	1,013	808	850	983	1,196	1,130	954	863	986	770	925	10,478	10.04%	1	0	1
Modern Centre Party	SMC	643	659	820	786	1,023	1,270	805	656	632	672	681	8,647	8.29%	0	1	1
New Slovenia – Christian Democrats	NSi	568	813	1,624	531	646	979	618	493	820	432	563	8,087	7.75%	0	1	1
The Left	Levica	527	357	531	548	607	1,076	309	465	501	782	397	6,100	5.85%	0	1	1
Democratic Party of Pensioners of Slovenia	DeSUS	566	221	524	820	611	532	522	383	366	545	733	5,823	5.58%	0	1	1
Slovenian National Party	SNS	431	346	321	444	553	610	743	352	747	391	483	5,421	5.19%	0	1	1
Slovenian People's Party	SLS	347	152	192	321	797	348	216	141	581	215	549	3,859	3.70%	0	0	0
Party of Alenka Bratušek	SAB	264	265	244	275	476	532	202	283	416	442	243	3,642	3.49%	0	0	0
Andrej Čuš and Greens of Slovenia	AČZS	72	166	52	106	76	79	247	78	1,043	727	436	3,082	2.95%	0	0	0
Save Slovenia from Elite and Tycoons	ReSET	572	228	66	82	389	162	64	215	134	48	65	2,025	1.94%	0	0	0
Pirate Party		126	98	146	109	120	235	60	127	140	171	98	1,430	1.37%	0	0	0
Good Country	DD	129	47	54	68	77	106	85	75	133	125	71	970	0.93%	0	0	0
List of Journalist Bojan Požar	LNBP	37	47	37	32	200	93	28	81	49	64	44	712	0.68%	0	0	0
United Slovenia	ZSi	60	47	51	46	64	54	63	83	88	56	55	667	0.64%	0	0	0
For a Healthy Society	ZD	85	69	32	37	60	53	24	43	50	47	21	521	0.50%	0	0	0
United Right		16	30	8	12	11	50	13	32	138	18	31	359	0.34%	0	0	0
United Left and Unity	ZLS	40	59	31	11	58	37	14	16	25	20	24	335	0.32%	0	0	0
Economic Active Party	GAS	20	13	23	14	41	29	6	116	19	21	25	327	0.31%	0	0	0
Party of Slovenian People	SSN	29	16	24	11	34	21	28	13	35	26	32	269	0.26%	0	0	0
Movement Together Forward	GSN	16	13	16	8	18	23	12	34	36	44	48	268	0.26%	0	0	0
Socialist Party of Slovenia	SPS	8	10	11	13	30	41	5	13	31	23	10	195	0.19%	0	0	0
Solidarity–For a Fair Society!		24	5	15	41	19	16	8	10	15	14	14	181	0.17%	0	0	0
Valid votes		8,914	7,705	9,252	7,905	12,170	13,159	7,552	8,100	11,105	9,079	9,420	104,361	100.00%	5	6	11
Rejected votes		105	64	140	100	103	124	81	89	102	78	118	1,104	1.05%			
Total polled		9,019	7,769	9,392	8,005	12,273	13,283	7,633	8,189	11,207	9,157	9,538	105,465	49.41%			
Registered electors		18,205	16,209	21,967	15,662	25,380	25,469	14,714	16,733	21,560	17,487	20,070	213,456				
Turnout		49.54%	47.93%	42.76%	51.11%	48.36%	52.15%	51.88%	48.94%	51.98%	52.36%	47.52%	49.41%				

The following candidates were elected:

- Constituency seats - Franc Breznik (SDS, Lenart), 2,697 votes; Aljaž Kovačič (LMŠ, Ormož), 954 votes; Suzana Lep Šimenko (SDS, Ptuj 3), 3,265 votes; Marijan Pojbič (SDS, Pesnica), 2,861 votes; and Dejan Židan (SD, Murska Sobota 2), 2,803 votes.
- National seats - Jožef Horvat (NSi, Lendava), 1,624 votes; Jani Ivanuša (SNS, Ormož), 743 votes; Franc Jurša (DeSUS, Ljutomer), 820 votes; Boštjan Koražija (Levica, Ptuj 2), 782 votes; Jožef Lenart (SDS, Ptuj 1), 3,406 votes; and Mojca Žnidarič (SMC, Ormož), 805 votes.

Substitutions:

- Franc Breznik (SDS, Lenart) forfeited his seat on 2 April 2020 upon being appointed to the government and was replaced by Nuša Ferenčič (SDS, Ptuj 2) on the same day.
- Nuša Ferenčič (SDS, Ptuj 2) forfeited her seat on 18 April 2020 when Franc Breznik (SDS, Lenart) lost his government position, regaining his seat.

===== 2014 =====
Results of the 2014 parliamentary election held on 13 July 2014:

Party		Votes per electoral district											Total votes	%	Seats		
Party		Gornja Radgona	Lenart	Lendava	Ljutomer	Murska Sobota 1	Murska Sobota 2	Ormož	Pesnica	Ptuj 1	Ptuj 2	Ptuj 3	Total votes	%	Con.	Nat.	Tot.
Modern Centre Party	SMC	2,641	1,968	2,612	2,458	3,385	4,033	1,818	2,438	2,659	3,065	2,237	29,314	29.77%	3	1	4
Slovenian Democratic Party	SDS	1,430	2,099	1,680	1,239	1,876	2,317	1,353	2,184	2,496	2,044	2,221	20,939	21.27%	2	2	4
Democratic Party of Pensioners of Slovenia	DeSUS	1,104	647	1,010	1,539	1,230	1,237	925	998	804	767	921	11,182	11.36%	1	0	1
Social Democrats	SD	829	446	464	571	1,374	2,247	416	397	384	682	472	8,282	8.41%	1	0	1
Slovenian People's Party	SLS	441	478	257	373	1,361	572	448	244	1,057	258	962	6,451	6.55%	0	0	0
New Slovenia – Christian Democrats	NSi	474	394	1,084	311	457	663	646	295	653	261	377	5,615	5.70%	0	1	1
United Left	ZL	388	341	350	339	344	647	222	335	456	507	353	4,282	4.35%	0	0	0
Alliance of Alenka Bratušek	ZaAB	283	190	317	385	611	550	238	234	382	426	300	3,916	3.98%	0	0	0
Slovenian National Party	SNS	221	233	175	171	598	345	383	260	745	274	341	3,746	3.80%	0	0	0
Positive Slovenia	PS	133	81	109	93	198	206	201	66	92	133	121	1,433	1.46%	0	0	0
Pirate Party		102	68	81	65	118	188	64	86	95	95	0	962	0.98%	0	0	0
Verjamem		228	54	111	48	84	96	43	74	44	74	52	908	0.92%	0	0	0
Civic List	DL	53	90	93	41	60	49	19	24	35	33	41	538	0.55%	0	0	0
Greens of Slovenia	ZS	38	29	53	37	48	36	27	39	35	119	53	514	0.52%	0	0	0
Equal Land–Forward Slovenia	ED-NPS	0	0	0	11	28	30	17	20	22	18	28	174	0.18%	0	0	0
Economically Liberal Party	LGS	1	4	9	14	23	31	9	5	6	12	7	121	0.12%	0	0	0
Party of Humane Slovenia	HS	8	8	0	0	0	0	0	11	15	29	14	85	0.09%	0	0	0
Valid votes		8,374	7,130	8,405	7,695	11,795	13,247	6,829	7,710	9,980	8,797	8,500	98,462	100.00%	7	4	11
Rejected votes		88	95	119	98	91	111	99	101	102	88	138	1,130	1.13%			
Total polled		8,462	7,225	8,524	7,793	11,886	13,358	6,928	7,811	10,082	8,885	8,638	99,592	46.28%			
Registered electors		18,373	15,992	22,190	15,775	25,872	25,637	14,985	16,877	21,379	17,753	20,360	215,193				
Turnout		46.06%	45.18%	38.41%	49.40%	45.94%	52.10%	46.23%	46.28%	47.16%	50.05%	42.43%	46.28%				

The following candidates were elected:

- Constituency seats - Franc Breznik (SDS, Lenart), 2,099 votes; Franc Jurša (DeSUS, Ljutomer), 1,539 votes; Aleksander Kavčič (SMC, Ljutomer), 2,458 votes; Klavdija Markež (SMC, Ptuj 2), 3,065 votes; Marijan Pojbič (SDS, Pesnica), 2,184 votes; Vesna Vervega (SMC, Pesnica), 2,438 votes; and Dejan Židan (SD, Murska Sobota 2), 2,247 votes.
- National seats - Andrej Čuš (SDS, Ptuj 1), 2,496 votes; Jožef Horvat (NSi, Lendava), 1,084 votes; Franc Laj (SMC, Lendava), 2,612 votes; and Suzana Lep Šimenko (SDS, Ptuj 3), 2,221 votes.

Substitutions:

- Dejan Židan (SD, Murska Sobota 2) forfeited his seat on 18 September 2014 upon being elected to the government and was replaced by Marija Bačič (SD, Murska Sobota 1) on 30 September 2014.
- Klavdija Markež (SMC, Ptuj 2) forfeited her seat on 27 March 2015 upon being elected to the government and was replaced by Dušan Radič (SMC, Murska Sobota 2) on 31 March 2015.
- Dušan Radič (SMC, Murska Sobota 2) forfeited his seat on 9 April 2015 when Klavdija Markež (SMC, Ptuj 2) lost her government position, regaining her seat.
- Klavdija Markež (SMC, Ptuj 2) resigned on 9 April 2015 and was replaced by Dušan Radič (SMC, Murska Sobota 2) on the same day.

===== 2011 =====
Results of the 2011 parliamentary election held on 4 December 2011:

Party		Votes per electoral district											Total votes	%	Seats		
Party		Gornja Radgona	Lenart	Lendava	Ljutomer	Murska Sobota 1	Murska Sobota 2	Ormož	Pesnica	Ptuj 1	Ptuj 2	Ptuj 3	Total votes	%	Con.	Nat.	Tot.
Slovenian Democratic Party	SDS	2,653	3,017	2,647	1,991	2,969	3,286	2,888	3,818	4,252	3,449	4,225	35,195	27.83%	3	0	3
Zoran Janković's List – Positive Slovenia	LZJ-PS	1,702	1,139	2,113	1,434	2,239	3,545	1,755	1,408	1,748	2,477	1,527	21,087	16.67%	2	0	2
Slovenian People's Party	SLS	983	1,111	2,633	1,412	2,902	2,563	495	528	2,376	614	1,483	17,100	13.52%	1	1	2
Social Democrats	SD	1,543	736	786	832	2,505	2,118	533	830	776	1,231	802	12,692	10.03%	1	0	1
Gregor Virant's Civic List	LGV	1,030	1,092	660	713	859	1,379	856	781	1,354	1,091	1,127	10,942	8.65%	1	0	1
Democratic Party of Pensioners of Slovenia	DeSUS	971	554	659	1,801	889	821	864	738	936	866	1,030	10,129	8.01%	0	1	1
New Slovenia – Christian People's Party	NSi	580	369	1,033	421	448	857	709	300	788	399	485	6,389	5.05%	0	1	1
Liberal Democracy of Slovenia	LDS	272	458	348	289	520	583	256	214	345	239	341	3,865	3.06%	0	0	0
Slovenian National Party	SNS	298	219	159	168	386	311	532	254	313	209	211	3,060	2.42%	0	0	0
Youth Party – European Greens	SMS-Z	156	410	92	127	117	91	53	637	74	65	178	2,000	1.58%	0	0	0
Party for Sustainable; Development of Slovenia	TRS	118	119	77	91	115	187	76	64	102	212	85	1,246	0.99%	0	0	0
Zares		308	20	81	77	150	81	28	32	35	83	74	969	0.77%	0	0	0
Democratic Labour Party	DSD	59	53	96	42	64	60	70	55	49	60	68	676	0.53%	0	0	0
Greens of Slovenia	ZS	47	42	28	36	43	40	45	71	46	116	51	565	0.45%	0	0	0
Movement for Slovenia	GZS	22	22	15	26	28	57	10	16	22	30	36	284	0.22%	0	0	0
Party of Equal Opportunities	SEM-Si	18	11	25	7	38	15	6	10	16	0	0	146	0.12%	0	0	0
Party of Slovenian People	SSN	13	11	12	9	23	8	11	19	13	13	9	141	0.11%	0	0	0
Valid votes		10,773	9,383	11,464	9,476	14,295	16,002	9,187	9,775	13,245	11,154	11,732	126,486	100.00%	8	3	11
Rejected votes		234	185	224	234	216	238	169	246	235	162	291	2,434	1.89%			
Total polled		11,007	9,568	11,688	9,710	14,511	16,240	9,356	10,021	13,480	11,316	12,023	128,920	59.79%			
Registered electors		18,358	15,728	22,392	15,817	26,031	25,742	14,992	16,835	21,275	17,935	20,499	215,604				
Turnout		59.96%	60.83%	52.20%	61.39%	55.75%	63.09%	62.41%	59.52%	63.36%	63.09%	58.65%	59.79%				

The following candidates were elected:

- Constituency seats - Franc Breznik (SDS, Lenart), 3,017 votes; Branko Ficko (LZJ-PS, Murska Sobota 2), 3,545 votes; Darko Jazbec (LZJ-PS, Ptuj 2), 2,477 votes; Branko Marinič (SDS, Ptuj 3), 4,225 votes; Marijan Pojbič (SDS, Pesnica), 3,818 votes; Ivan Vogrin (LGV, Lenart), 1,092 votes; Radovan Žerjav (SLS, Lendava), 2,633 votes; and Dejan Židan (SD, Murska Sobota 1), 2,505 votes.
- National seats - Jožef Horvat (NSi, Lendava), 1,033 votes; Franc Jurša (DeSUS, Ljutomer), 1,801 votes; and Franc Pukšič (SLS, Ptuj 1), 2,376 votes.

Substitutions:

- Radovan Žerjav (SLS, Lendava) forfeited his seat on 10 February 2012 upon being elected to the government and was replaced by Jasmina Opec (SLS, Murska Sobota 2) on 14 February 2012.
- Branko Marinič (SDS, Ptuj 3) resigned on 1 February 2013 and was replaced by Andrej Čuš (SDS, Ptuj 1) on 4 February 2013.
- Jasmina Opec (SLS, Murska Sobota 2) forfeited her seat on 20 March 2013 when Radovan Žerjav (SLS, Lendava) lost his government position, regaining his seat.
- Radovan Žerjav (SLS, Lendava) resigned on 20 March 2013 and was replaced by Jasmina Opec (SLS, Murska Sobota 2) on 27 March 2013.
- Dejan Židan (SD, Murska Sobota 1) forfeited his seat on 20 March 2013 upon being elected to the government and was replaced by Branko Smodiš (SD, Ljutomer) on 27 March 2013.

==== 2000s ====
===== 2008 =====
Results of the 2008 parliamentary election held on 21 September 2008:

Party		Votes per electoral district											Total votes	%	Seats		
Party		Gornja Radgona	Lenart	Lendava	Ljutomer	Murska Sobota 1	Murska Sobota 2	Ormož	Pesnica	Ptuj 1	Ptuj 2	Ptuj 3	Total votes	%	Con.	Nat.	Tot.
Slovenian Democratic Party	SDS	2,944	2,874	2,936	2,179	4,063	4,162	2,635	3,503	5,374	3,397	4,203	38,270	31.75%	3	1	4
Social Democrats	SD	3,752	1,402	1,951	2,025	3,561	4,619	1,386	1,678	1,919	3,237	2,260	27,790	23.05%	2	0	2
Slovenian People's Party and Youth Party of Slovenia	SLS-SMS	359	1,081	1,847	941	1,075	1,721	158	1,196	547	232	996	10,153	8.42%	1	0	1
Democratic Party of Pensioners of Slovenia	DeSUS	795	556	599	1,953	780	653	788	734	539	833	806	9,036	7.50%	0	1	1
Liberal Democracy of Slovenia	LDS	358	1,272	937	544	1,737	1,685	275	300	599	634	592	8,933	7.41%	0	1	1
Slovenian National Party	SNS	798	468	573	462	1,294	990	750	578	778	701	721	8,113	6.73%	0	1	1
Zares		777	292	580	415	713	1,059	1,282	832	533	821	400	7,704	6.39%	0	1	1
New Slovenia – Christian People's Party	NSi	347	260	1,175	212	822	445	986	131	607	205	439	5,629	4.67%	0	0	0
Lipa		106	106	122	85	185	144	84	240	204	194	124	1,594	1.32%	0	0	0
List for Justice and Development	LPR	33	72	32	27	124	26	24	157	121	140	81	837	0.69%	0	0	0
Christian Democratic Party	SKD	69	46	77	29	71	183	73	24	56	16	30	674	0.56%	0	0	0
Greens of Slovenia	ZS	46	18	66	29	33	43	82	35	70	175	63	660	0.55%	0	0	0
Green Coalition: Green Party and Green Progress	ZL-ZP	43	16	98	46	68	64	3	39	6	18	11	412	0.34%	0	0	0
List for Clear Drinking Water	LZČPV	51	19	42	13	82	41	26	16	35	19	24	368	0.31%	0	0	0
Party of Slovenian People	SSN	25	30	33	23	70	37	17	21	36	35	39	366	0.30%	0	0	0
Valid votes		10,503	8,512	11,068	8,983	14,678	15,872	8,569	9,484	11,424	10,657	10,789	120,539	100.00%	6	5	11
Rejected votes		221	212	289	196	247	286	162	206	181	151	232	2,383	1.94%			
Total polled		10,724	8,724	11,357	9,179	14,925	16,158	8,731	9,690	11,605	10,808	11,021	122,922	57.28%			
Registered electors		18,318	15,318	22,415	15,747	26,133	25,725	14,881	16,776	20,913	18,096	20,282	214,604				
Turnout		58.54%	56.95%	50.67%	58.29%	57.11%	62.81%	58.67%	57.76%	55.49%	59.73%	54.34%	57.28%				

The following candidates were elected:

- Constituency seats - Anton Kampuš (SD, Gornja Radgona), 3,752 votes; Dejan Levanič (SD, Ptuj 2), 3,237 votes; Branko Marinič (SDS, Ptuj 3), 4,203 votes; Marijan Pojbič (SDS, Pesnica), 3,503 votes; Franc Pukšič (SDS, Ptuj 1), 5,376 votes; and Radovan Žerjav (SLS-SMS, Lendava), 1,847 votes.
- National seats - Marjan Bezjak (SDS, Lenart), 2,874 votes; Milan Gumzar (LDS, Lenart), 1,272 votes; Miran Györek (SNS, Murska Sobota 1), 1,294 votes; Franc Jurša (DeSUS, Ljutomer), 1,953 votes; and Vili Trofenik (Zares, Ormož), 1,282 votes.

===== 2004 =====
Results of the 2004 parliamentary election held on 3 October 2004:

Party		Votes per electoral district											Total votes	%	Seats		
Party		Gornja Radgona	Lenart	Lendava	Ljutomer	Murska Sobota 1	Murska Sobota 2	Ormož	Pesnica	Ptuj 1	Ptuj 2	Ptuj 3	Total votes	%	Con.	Nat.	Tot.
Slovenian Democratic Party	SDS	2,225	2,041	2,865	1,544	3,627	3,340	1,319	2,613	5,115	3,991	3,422	32,102	28.35%	3	0	3
Liberal Democracy of Slovenia	LDS	2,278	1,165	2,489	1,550	3,414	4,840	2,070	1,147	1,476	2,337	2,104	24,870	21.97%	2	1	3
New Slovenia – Christian People's Party	NSi	797	713	1,605	899	967	1,631	2,541	740	1,215	516	1,279	12,903	11.40%	1	1	2
Slovenian People's Party	SLS	706	1,516	892	881	1,257	1,571	496	786	1,269	777	1,198	11,349	10.02%	1	0	1
United List of Social Democrats	ZLSD	1,161	403	1,122	802	833	1,522	315	450	373	788	326	8,095	7.15%	0	1	1
Slovenian National Party	SNS	533	463	422	465	748	806	395	558	644	617	513	6,164	5.44%	0	1	1
Democratic Party of Pensioners of Slovenia	DeSUS	364	277	445	732	579	491	374	707	295	408	370	5,042	4.45%	0	0	0
Youth Party of Slovenia	SMS	414	564	946	305	425	355	310	435	320	268	305	4,647	4.10%	0	0	0
Active Slovenia	AS	109	150	184	331	352	274	71	91	172	187	93	2,014	1.78%	0	0	0
Slovenia Is Ours	SN	101	138	34	280	298	108	74	350	75	107	328	1,893	1.67%	0	0	0
Greens of Slovenia	ZS	73	41	96	100	81	73	38	57	102	187	100	948	0.84%	0	0	0
June List	JL	79	30	41	28	188	136	50	21	54	84	55	766	0.68%	0	0	0
List for Enterprising Slovenia	PS	22	54	36	40	82	115	104	16	88	76	45	678	0.60%	0	0	0
Women's Voice of Slovenia, Association for Primorska, Union of Independents of Slovenia and New Democracy of Slovenia	GZS- ZZP- ZNS- NDS	99	12	23	68	36	56	42	40	35	28	29	468	0.41%	0	0	0
Democratic Party of Slovenia	DS	45	38	46	29	45	50	36	46	25	23	47	430	0.38%	0	0	0
Party of Ecological; Movements of Slovenia	SEG	31	11	30	18	58	87	12	36	22	29	14	348	0.31%	0	0	0
Party of Slovenian People	SSN	86	34	24	14	37	21	25	16	35	9	23	324	0.29%	0	0	0
United for an Independent and Just Slovenia		35	7	11	1	51	33	9	3	8	9	9	176	0.16%	0	0	0
Valid votes		9,158	7,657	11,311	8,087	13,078	15,509	8,281	8,112	11,323	10,441	10,260	113,217	100.00%	7	4	11
Rejected votes		224	232	347	204	280	323	217	248	163	167	268	2,673	2.31%			
Total polled		9,382	7,889	11,658	8,291	13,358	15,832	8,498	8,360	11,486	10,608	10,528	115,890	56.06%			
Registered electors		17,616	14,591	20,814	15,250	25,408	25,075	14,386	15,971	20,068	18,044	19,511	206,734				
Turnout		53.26%	54.07%	56.01%	54.37%	52.57%	63.14%	59.07%	52.34%	57.24%	58.79%	53.96%	56.06%				

The following candidates were elected:

- Constituency seats - Geza Džuban (LDS, Murska Sobota 1), 3,414 votes; Janez Kramberger (SLS, Lenart), 1,516 votes; Miroslav Luci (SDS, Ptuj 2), 3,991 votes; Branko Marinič (SDS, Ptuj 3), 3,422 votes; Franc Pukšič (SDS, Ptuj 1), 5,115 votes; Alojz Sok (NSi, Ormož), 2,541 votes; and Mitja Slavinec (LDS, Murska Sobota 2), 4,840 votes.
- National seats - Feri Horvat (ZLSD, Gornja Radgona), 1,161 votes; Jožef Horvat (NSi, Lendava), 1,605 votes; Vili Trofenik (LDS, Ormož), 2,070 votes; and Boštjan Zagorac (SNS, Pesnica), 558 votes.

Substitutions:

- Miroslav Luci (SDS, Ptuj 2) forfeited his upon being appointed to the government and was replaced by Jožef Ficko (SDS, Murska Sobota 1) on 16 December 2004.
- Franc Pukšič (SDS, Ptuj 1) forfeited his upon being appointed to the government and was replaced by Marijan Pojbič (SDS, Pesnica) on 16 December 2004.ref name="Uradni 137/2004"/>
- Jožef Ficko (SDS, Murska Sobota 1) forfeited his seat on 30 November 2005 when Miroslav Luci (SDS, Ptuj 2) lost his government position, regaining his seat.
- Marijan Pojbič (SDS, Pesnica) forfeited his seat on 30 November 2005 when Franc Pukšič (SDS, Ptuj 1) lost his government position, regaining his seat.
- Miroslav Luci (SDS, Ptuj 2) resigned on 30 November 2005 and was replaced by Marijan Pojbič (SDS, Pesnica) on 8 December 2005.

===== 2000 =====
Results of the 2000 parliamentary election held on 15 October 2000:

Party		Votes per electoral district											Total votes	%	Seats		
Party		Gornja Radgona	Lenart	Lendava	Ljutomer	Murska Sobota 1	Murska Sobota 2	Ormož	Pesnica	Ptuj 1	Ptuj 2	Ptuj 3	Total votes	%	Con.	Nat.	Tot.
Liberal Democracy of Slovenia	LDS	2,772	2,084	5,539	4,327	7,325	7,778	2,249	2,378	2,968	4,532	4,091	46,043	36.72%	4	1	5
Social Democratic Party of Slovenia	SDSS	897	1,107	1,472	1,598	1,896	1,646	822	1,099	3,170	2,510	1,579	17,796	14.19%	1	0	1
Slovenian People's Party and Slovene Christian Democrats	SLS-SKD	1,197	2,190	1,207	848	1,579	1,303	2,103	1,300	2,183	562	1,164	15,636	12.47%	1	1	2
New Slovenia – Christian People's Party	NSi	922	692	1,535	796	1,016	1,595	1,418	557	1,362	729	1,524	12,146	9.69%	1	0	1
United List of Social Democrats	ZLSD	2,321	621	555	595	1,339	1,465	522	629	592	1,136	933	10,708	8.54%	1	0	1
Democratic Party of Pensioners of Slovenia	DeSUS	593	251	753	874	845	661	927	939	609	650	908	8,010	6.39%	0	1	1
Slovenian National Party	SNS	385	309	334	369	511	701	285	712	365	550	355	4,876	3.89%	0	0	0
Youth Party of Slovenia	SMS	443	203	773	188	439	529	289	315	430	472	328	4,409	3.52%	0	0	0
Democratic Party of Slovenia	DS	70	173	119	18	557	605	59	139	70	62	63	1,935	1.54%	0	0	0
Greens of Slovenia	ZS	106	64	476	112	178	149	142	69	90	126	89	1,601	1.28%	0	0	0
Women's Voice of Slovenia	GŽS	106	62	0	67	172	126	124	141	123	103	139	1,163	0.93%	0	0	0
New Party	NS	118	65	115	31	116	104	67	57	72	51	98	894	0.71%	0	0	0
Regional Party of Styria	DSŠ	40	26	0	15	0	12	23	0	45	20	0	181	0.14%	0	0	0
Valid votes		9,970	7,847	12,878	9,838	15,973	16,674	9,030	8,335	12,079	11,503	11,271	125,398	100.00%	8	3	11
Rejected votes		378	303	548	249	489	440	382	323	410	283	439	4,244	3.27%			
Total polled		10,348	8,150	13,426	10,087	16,462	17,114	9,412	8,658	12,489	11,786	11,710	129,642	64.20%			
Registered electors		17,066	14,017	20,558	15,031	25,361	24,752	14,032	15,172	19,036	17,963	18,948	201,936				
Turnout		60.64%	58.14%	65.31%	67.11%	64.91%	69.14%	67.08%	57.07%	65.61%	65.61%	61.80%	64.20%				

The following candidates were elected:

- Constituency seats - Geza Džuban (LDS); Andrej Gerenčer (LDS); Feri Horvat (ZLSD); Janez Kramberger (SLS-SKD); Ciril Pucko (LDS); Franc Pukšič (SDSS); Alojz Sok (NSi); and Jožef Špindler (LDS).
- National seats - Lidija Majnik (LDS); Valentin Pohorec (DeSUS); and Vili Trofenik (SLS-SKD).

Substitutions:

- Andrej Gerenčer (LDS) forfeited his seat on 15 May 2002 upon being appointed ambassador to Hungary and was replaced by Anton Butolen (LDS) on 11 June 2002.

==== 1990s ====
===== 1996 =====
Results of the 1996 parliamentary election held on 10 November 1996:

Party		Votes per electoral district											Total votes	%	Seats		
Party		Gornja Radgona	Lenart	Lendava	Ljutomer	Murska Sobota 1	Murska Sobota 2	Ormož	Pesnica	Ptuj 1	Ptuj 2	Ptuj 3	Total votes	%	Con.	Nat.	Tot.
Liberal Democracy of Slovenia	LDS	2,963	1,847	3,000	3,222	5,247	6,639	1,923	1,509	2,128	3,468	2,220	34,166	27.48%	3	0	3
Slovenian People's Party	SLS	1,898	2,493	2,801	2,225	3,704	2,496	3,922	1,979	3,825	1,394	2,511	29,248	23.52%	2	1	3
Social Democratic Party of Slovenia	SDSS	1,000	1,292	1,098	641	2,041	1,396	753	1,190	2,560	2,870	1,957	16,798	13.51%	1	1	2
Slovene Christian Democrats	SKD	1,693	871	2,448	1,226	1,703	2,557	1,071	993	1,511	742	1,595	16,410	13.20%	1	0	1
Democratic Party of Pensioners of Slovenia	DeSUS	739	205	477	757	508	514	853	765	634	598	1,014	7,064	5.68%	0	1	1
United List of Social Democrats	ZLSD	1,040	174	860	604	1,017	843	376	424	257	564	319	6,478	5.21%	0	1	1
Slovenian National Party	SNS	206	180	183	203	309	358	150	246	199	306	229	2,569	2.07%	0	0	0
Greens of Slovenia	ZS	142	136	473	190	206	194	217	121	137	343	329	2,488	2.00%	0	0	0
Slovenian Craftsmen and Entrepreneurial; Party and Centrum Party	SOPS	126	68	118	183	163	127	55	173	322	266	394	1,995	1.60%	0	0	0
Democratic Party of Slovenia	DS	201	151	142	85	130	173	65	98	152	211	97	1,505	1.21%	0	0	0
Franc Klančar (Independent)	Ind	82	20	115	71	280	234	40	15	42	68	35	1,002	0.81%	0	0	0
Liberal Party	LS	34	20	101	49	479	72	39	30	50	40	37	951	0.76%	0	0	0
Communist Party of Slovenia	KPS	44	20	75	40	132	74	39	54	64	109	64	715	0.58%	0	0	0
Green Alternative of Slovenia	ZA	43	26	109	39	168	80	28	103	50	19	39	704	0.57%	0	0	0
National Labour Party	NSD	68	38	58	42	106	43	37	56	60	51	90	649	0.52%	0	0	0
Christian Social Union	KSU	23	33	82	29	67	35	23	44	26	20	46	428	0.34%	0	0	0
Slovenian Forum	SF	31	76	35	23	32	52	62	20	10	53	14	408	0.33%	0	0	0
Slovenian National Right	SND	14	14	25	21	41	26	16	33	47	59	61	357	0.29%	0	0	0
Republican Association of Slovenia	RZS	12	18	28	19	36	25	16	17	25	30	22	248	0.20%	0	0	0
Patriotic United Retirement Party and League for Slovenia	DEUS-LZS	0	0	0	0	115	49	0	0	0	0	0	164	0.13%	0	0	0
Valid votes		10,359	7,682	12,228	9,669	16,484	15,987	9,685	7,870	12,099	11,211	11,073	124,347	100.00%	7	4	11
Rejected votes													7,857	5.94%			
Total polled													132,204	67.07%			
Registered electors													197,119				
Turnout													67.07%				

The following candidates were elected:

- Constituency seats - Geza Džuban (LDS); Andrej Gerenčer (LDS); Janez Kramberger (SLS); Miroslav Luci (SDSS); Ciril Pucko (SKD); Jožef Špindler (LDS); and Vili Trofenik (SLS).
- National seats - Feri Horvat (ZLSD); Zoran Lešnik (DeSUS); Franc Pukšič (SDSS); and Alojz Vesenjak (SLS).

===== 1992 =====
Results of the 1992 parliamentary election held on 6 December 1992:

Party		Votes	%	Seats		
Party		Votes	%	Con.	Nat.	Tot.
Liberal Democracy of Slovenia	LDS	27,905	19.41%	2	0	2
Slovene Christian Democrats	SKD	25,265	17.57%	1	1	2
Slovenian People's Party	SLS	20,872	14.52%	1	0	1
United List	ZL	15,729	10.94%	1	0	1
Greens of Slovenia	ZS	6,541	4.55%	0	1	1
Social Democratic Party of Slovenia	SDSS	6,380	4.44%	0	1	1
Democratic Party of Slovenia	DS	6,345	4.41%	0	0	0
Socialist Party of Slovenia	SSS	4,972	3.46%	0	0	0
Slovenian National Party	SNS	4,677	3.25%	0	0	0
National Democratic Party and Slovenian Party	ND-SGS	3,136	2.18%	0	0	0
Liberal Party	LS	2,975	2.07%	0	0	0
Styrian Democratic Christian Party	SDKS	2,847	1.98%	0	0	0
Liberal Democratic Party of Slovenia	LDSS	2,579	1.79%	0	0	0
Slovenian Craftsmen and Entrepreneurial; Party and Centrum Party	SOPS	2,398	1.67%	0	0	0
Independent	Ind	2,101	1.46%	0	0	0
Independent Party	SN	1,805	1.26%	0	0	0
DEMOS	DEMOS	1,605	1.12%	0	0	0
Christian Socialists, DS Forward and Free Party	KS-DS	1,565	1.09%	0	0	0
“SMER" Association of Slovenia	SMER	970	0.67%	0	0	0
Slovenian Ecological Movement	SEG	918	0.64%	0	0	0
Provincial Party of Slovenia	DSS	912	0.63%	0	0	0
Republican Association of Slovenia	RZS	868	0.60%	0	0	0
Movement for General Democracy	GOD	403	0.28%	0	0	0
Valid votes		143,768	100.00%	5	3	8
Rejected votes		12,407	7.94%			
Total polled		156,175	80.95%			
Registered electors		192,920				

The following candidates were elected:

- Constituency seats - Gabrijel Berlič (LDS); Geza Džuban (LDS); Feri Horvat (ZL); Ciril Pucko (SKD); and Ludvik Toplak (SLS).
- National seats - Jožef Kocuvan (SKD); Bojan Korošec (ZS); and Drago Šiftar (SDSS).

Substitutions:

- Ciril Pucko (SKD) forfeited his seat on 11 September 1996 and was replaced by Jože Rajšp (SKD) on the same day.
- Ludvik Toplak (SLS) forfeited his seat on 9 November 1993 and was replaced by Janez Vindiš (SLS) on 25 February 1994.
