= Urban Municipality of Murska Sobota =

Urban municipality of Slovenia

Urban Municipality of Murska Sobota Mestna občina Murska Sobota
- City Municipality
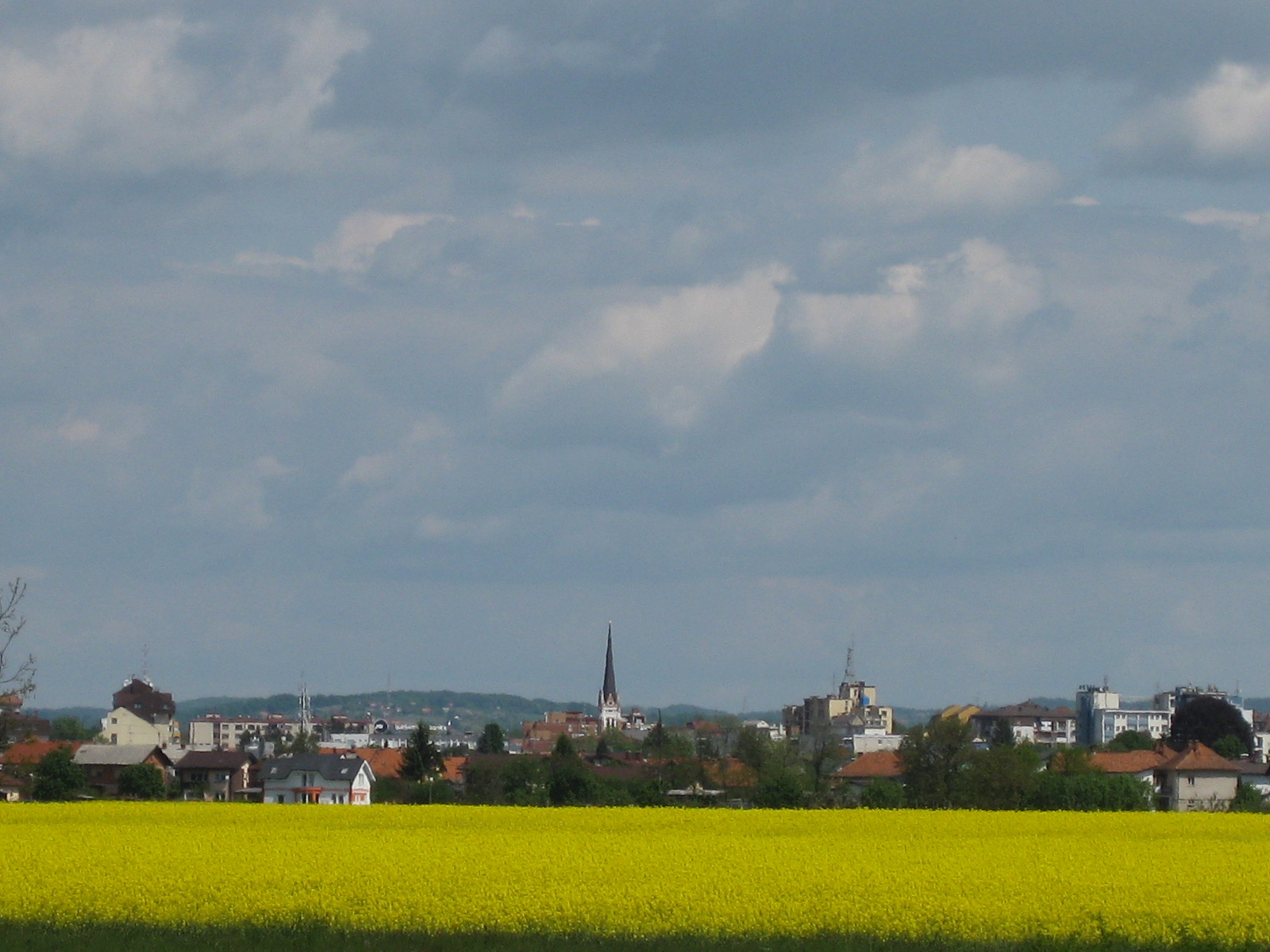

- Flag Coat of arms

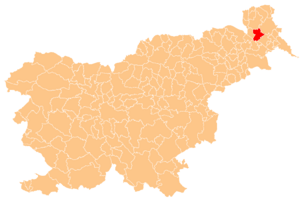
- Location of the Urban Municipality of Murska Sobota in Slovenia
- Coordinates: 46°39′N 16°10′E
- Country: Slovenia

Government
  - Mayor: Damjan Anželj (SD)

Area
  - Total: 64.4 km^{2} (24.9 sq mi)

Population (July 1, 2018)
  - Total: 18,752
  - Density: 291/km^{2} (754/sq mi)
- Time zone: UTC+01 (CET)
  - Summer (DST): UTC+02 (CEST)
- Postal code: SI-9000
- Area code: 02
- Website: www.murska-sobota.si

The Urban Municipality of Murska Sobota (pronounced [ˈmuːɾska ˈsoːbɔta]; Slovene: Mestna občina Murska Sobota) is one of twelve urban municipalities of Slovenia. It lies in northeastern Slovenia and was established in 1994. Its seat is the town of Murska Sobota. The area belongs to the traditional region of Prekmurje and has been included in the Mura Statistical Region since 1995.

== Settlements ==
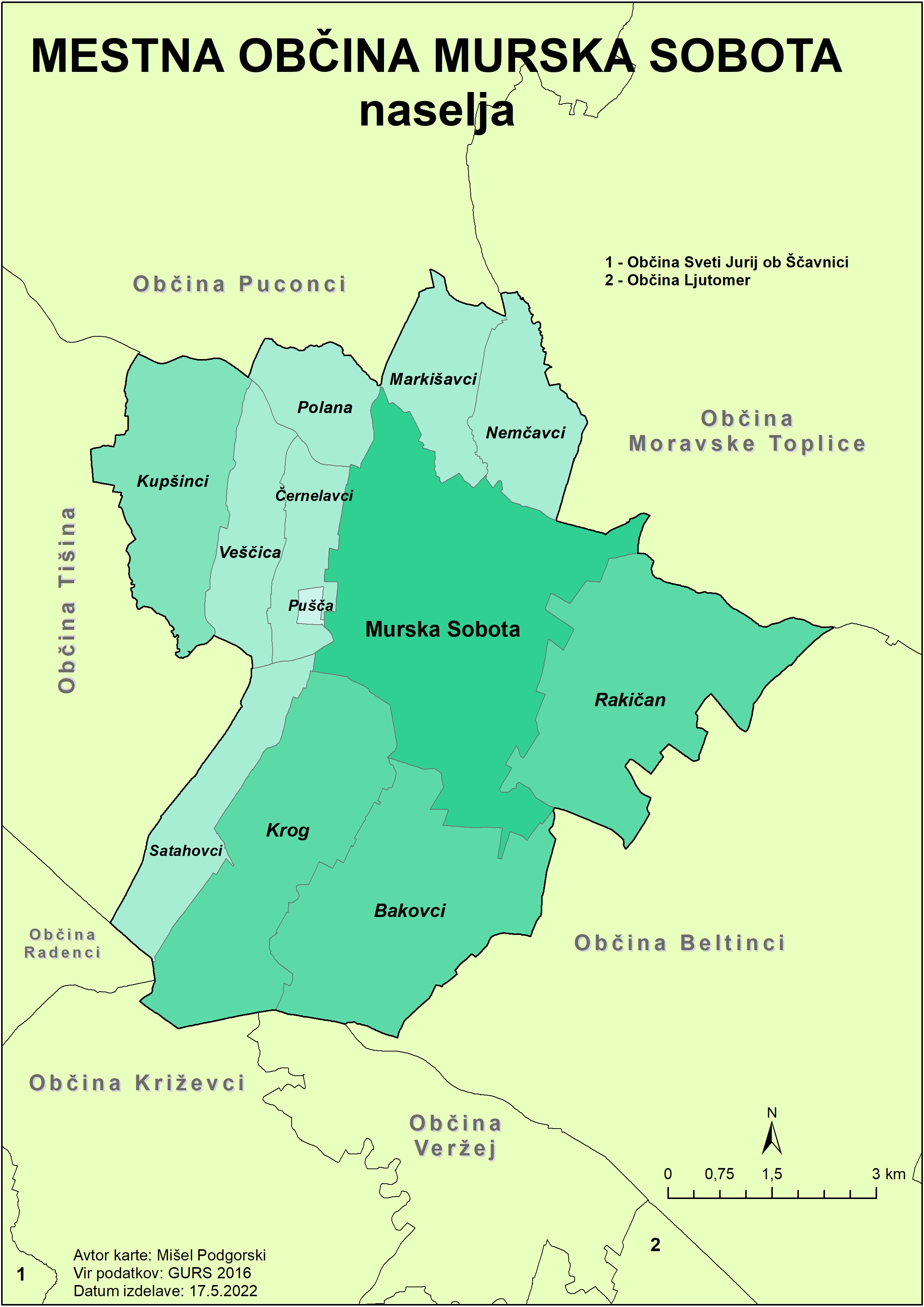
Villages in the municipality

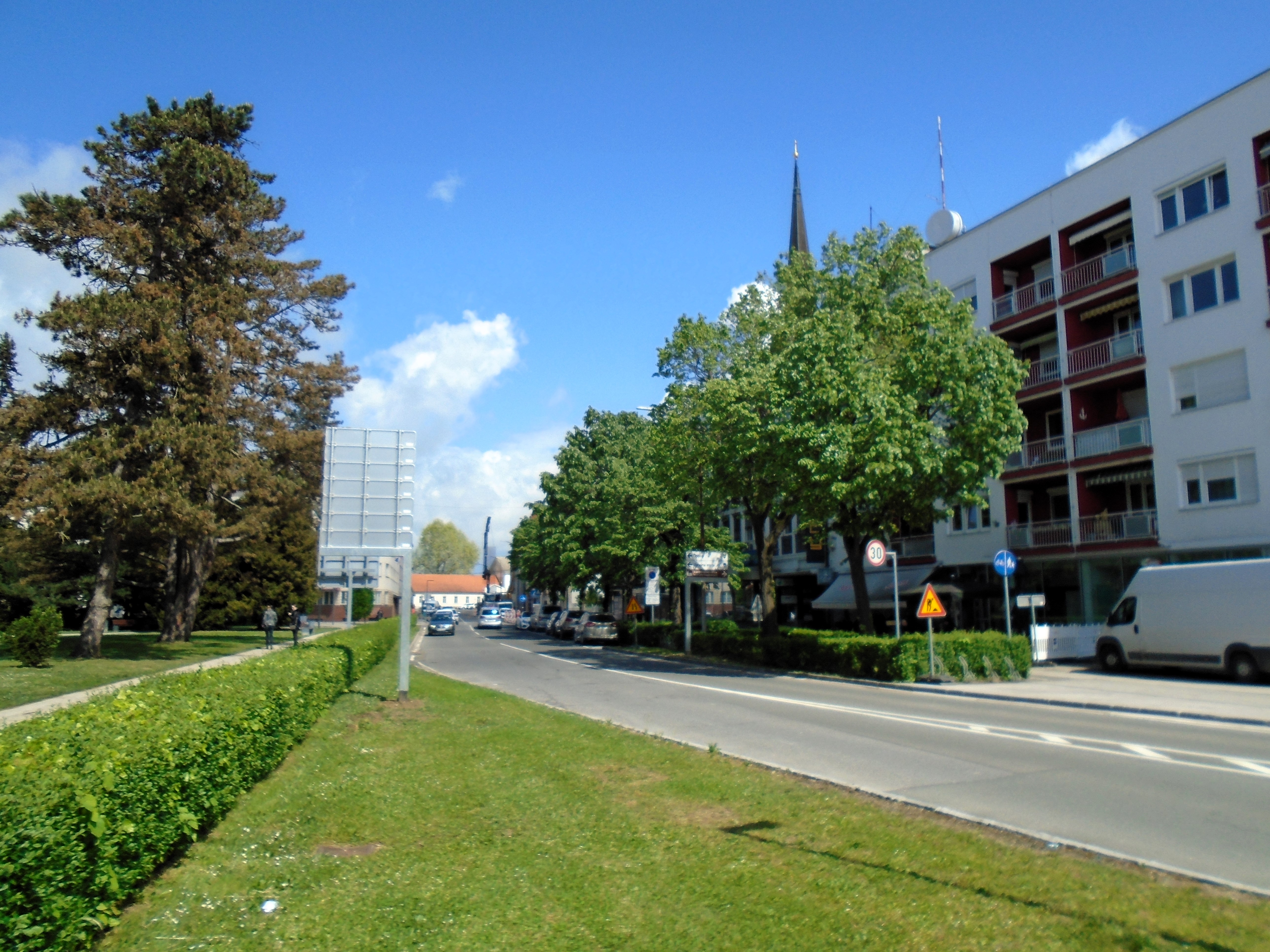
Lendava Street in the town of Murska Sobota

In addition to the municipal seat of Murska Sobota, the municipality also includes the following settlements:

- Bakovci
- Černelavci
- Krog
- Kupšinci
- Markišavci
- Nemčavci
- Polana
- Pušča
- Rakičan
- Satahovci
- Veščica
