= Sovjak =

Sovjak may refer to:

- Sovjak, Bosnia and Herzegovina, a village near Gradiška
- Sovjak, Sveti Jurij ob Ščavnici, a settlement in northeastern Slovenia
- Sovjak, Trnovska Vas, a settlement in northeastern Slovenia
- Sovjak, Croatia, a village near Suhopolje

== See also ==
- Sovljak (disambiguation), villages in Serbia
- Soyak, a town and Village Development Committee in Nepal
- Soyjak, a variation of the Wojak internet meme
