= Luka Simonič =

Slovenian politician (born 1999)

Member of the National Assembly
- Incumbent
- Assumed office 9 June 2026
- Preceded by: Suzana Lep Šimenko
- Constituency: Ptuj – Pesnica

Personal details
- Born: 27 August 1999 (age 27) Krems, Austria
- Party: Slovenian Democratic Party

Luka Simonič (born 27 August 1999) is a Slovenian politician serving as a member of the National Assembly since 2026. He has served as chairman of the Slovenian Democratic Youth since 2024.
