= Iván Persa =

Hungarian Slovene Roman Catholic priest and writer

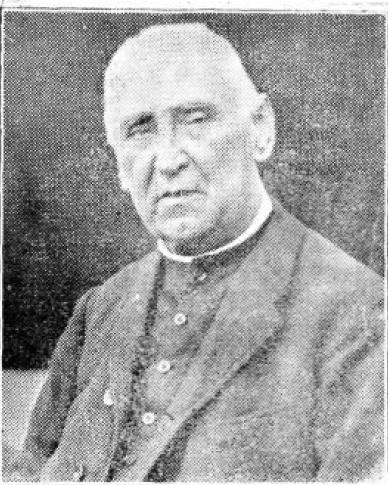
Iván Persa, Slovene writer and Catholic priest in Prekmurje

Iván Persa (Slovene: Ivan Perša) (April 2, 1861 – September 26, 1935) was a Hungarian Slovene Roman Catholic priest and writer.

Born in the Municipality of Beltinci in the village of Ižakovci, his parents were the farmers István Persa and Mária Kolár. He was ordained on July 14, 1885. Between 1885–1887 he served as a curate in Grad, where he founded the Scapulary and Heart of Jesus and Mary associations. From 1887–1894 he was a priest in Alsószölnök. From 1894–1913 he was a priest in Felsőszölnök, near Szentgotthárd. There, he also founded his two associations.

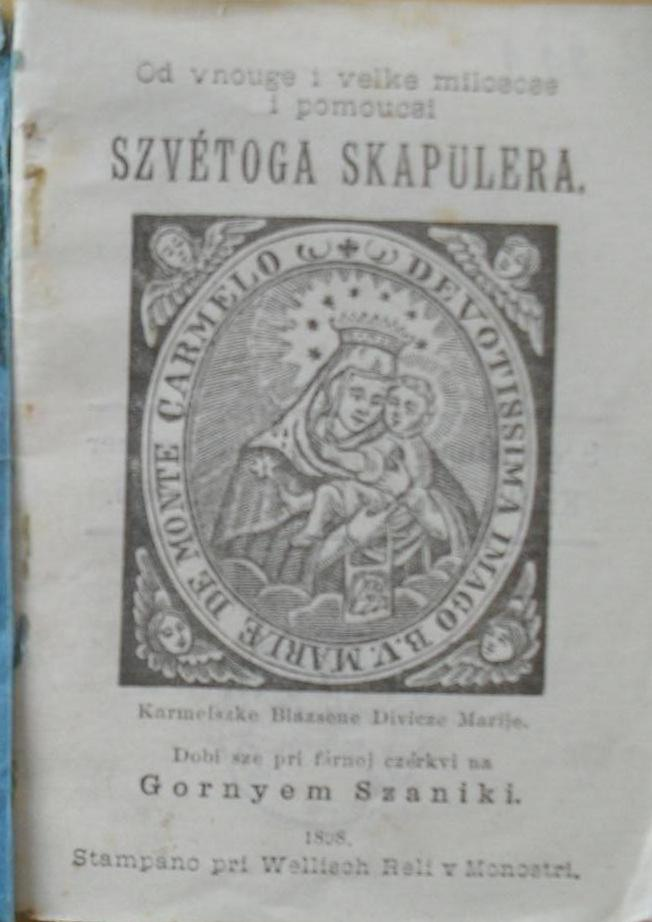
Od vnouge i velke miloscse i pomoucsi szvétoga skapulera, a Prekmurje Slovene scapular written by Persa in 1898.

By 1913 he was a priest in Pečarovci at St. Sebastian's Church. He died there in 1935.

== See also ==
- List of Slovene writers and poets in Hungary
