= Ana Osterman =

Slovene social worker and politician (born 1940)

Ana Osterman MP

Minister of Veterans Affairs
- In office 14 May 1992 – 25 January 1993
- Prime Minister: Janez Drnovšek
- Preceded by: Franc Godeša
- Succeeded by: Office disestablished

Member of Parliament
- In office 1990–1992

Personal details
- Born: 1940 (age 85–86) Krog, Prekmurje, Slovenia
- Party: Social Democrats

Ana Osterman (born 1940) is a Slovene social worker and politician who served as the Minister of Veterans Affairs from 1992 until 1993. A member of the Social Democrats, she previously served in the Parliament of Slovenia from 1990 until 1992.

== Biography ==
Ana Osterman was born in 1940 at the village of Krog in the Prekmurje region of Slovenia. Due to the presence of a nearby Roma settlement, Osterman was raised in a multicultural environment; this influenced her beliefs towards solidarity and tolerance. Her experiences growing up led her to become interested in social work, and she graduated from university with a degree in sociology. Osterman is considered to be an expert in the social situations in Slovenia. Initially focusing on "youth responsibility and crime", she eventually came to lead the Center for Social Work in the town of Ptuj for fourteen years. She later served as state secretary for social welfare in the Ministry of Labour, Family and Social Affairs.

Osterman was elected to the Parliament of Slovenia in the 1990 Slovenian parliamentary election, the first free and fair election in the country since 1925. A member of the Social Democrats, she "strove to solve women's issues in particular" during her tenure. Osterman left office at the end of her term in 1992. Later that year, she was appointed Minister of Veterans Affairs in the first government of Janez Drnovšek, serving until 1993.

Following her political career, Osterman has continued to engage in social work. Since 1999, she has been "a member of the Slovenian Philanthropy Association for the Promotion of Volunteering". She also led the Ptuj Optimists Association, through which she advocates for the elderly via a series of programs to provide assistance and social help.
