= Bišečki Vrh =

- Location in Slovenia
- Coordinates: 46°30′55.54″N 15°52′27.19″E
- Country: Slovenia
- Traditional region: Styria
- Statistical region: Drava
- Municipality: Trnovska Vas

Area
  - Total: 2.34 km^{2} (0.90 sq mi)
- Elevation: 321.4 m (1,054 ft)

Population (2002)
  - Total: 158

Bišečki Vrh (pronounced [biˈʃeːtʃki ˈʋəɾx]) is a settlement in the Municipality of Trnovska Vas in northeastern Slovenia. It lies in the hills west of Trnovska Vas. The area is part of the traditional region of Styria. It is now included in the Drava Statistical Region.

A small chapel-shrine in the settlement was built in the early 20th century.
