= Črmlja =

- Location in Slovenia
- Coordinates: 46°31′22.28″N 15°52′3.22″E
- Country: Slovenia
- Traditional region: Styria
- Statistical region: Drava
- Municipality: Trnovska Vas

Area
  - Total: 1.48 km^{2} (0.57 sq mi)
- Elevation: 262 m (860 ft)

Population (2002)
  - Total: 88

Črmlja (pronounced [ˈtʃəːɾmlja]) is a settlement in the Municipality of Trnovska Vas in northeastern Slovenia. It lies in a valley of a minor right tributary of the Pesnica River west of Trnovska Vas. The area is part of the traditional region of Styria. It is now included in the Drava Statistical Region.

A number of Roman period burial mounds have been identified in the hills southwest of the settlement in the Črmlja Woods (Slovene: Črmljenski les).
