= Ločič =

- Location in Slovenia
- Coordinates: 46°30′34.15″N 15°54′32.57″E
- Country: Slovenia
- Traditional region: Styria
- Statistical region: Drava
- Municipality: Trnovska Vas

Area
  - Total: 3.14 km^{2} (1.21 sq mi)
- Elevation: 225.7 m (740 ft)

Population (2002)
  - Total: 136

Ločič (pronounced [ˈloːtʃitʃ]) is a village on the left bank of the Pesnica River in the Municipality of Trnovska Vas in northeastern Slovenia. The area is part of the traditional region of Styria. It is now included in the Drava Statistical Region.

There is a small chapel-shrine and a plague column right next to it in the centre of the settlement. The column dates to the 16th century and the shrine was built in the early 20th century.

Two Roman-era burial mounds have been identified near the settlement.
