= Pečarovci =

Pečarovci Pečörovci
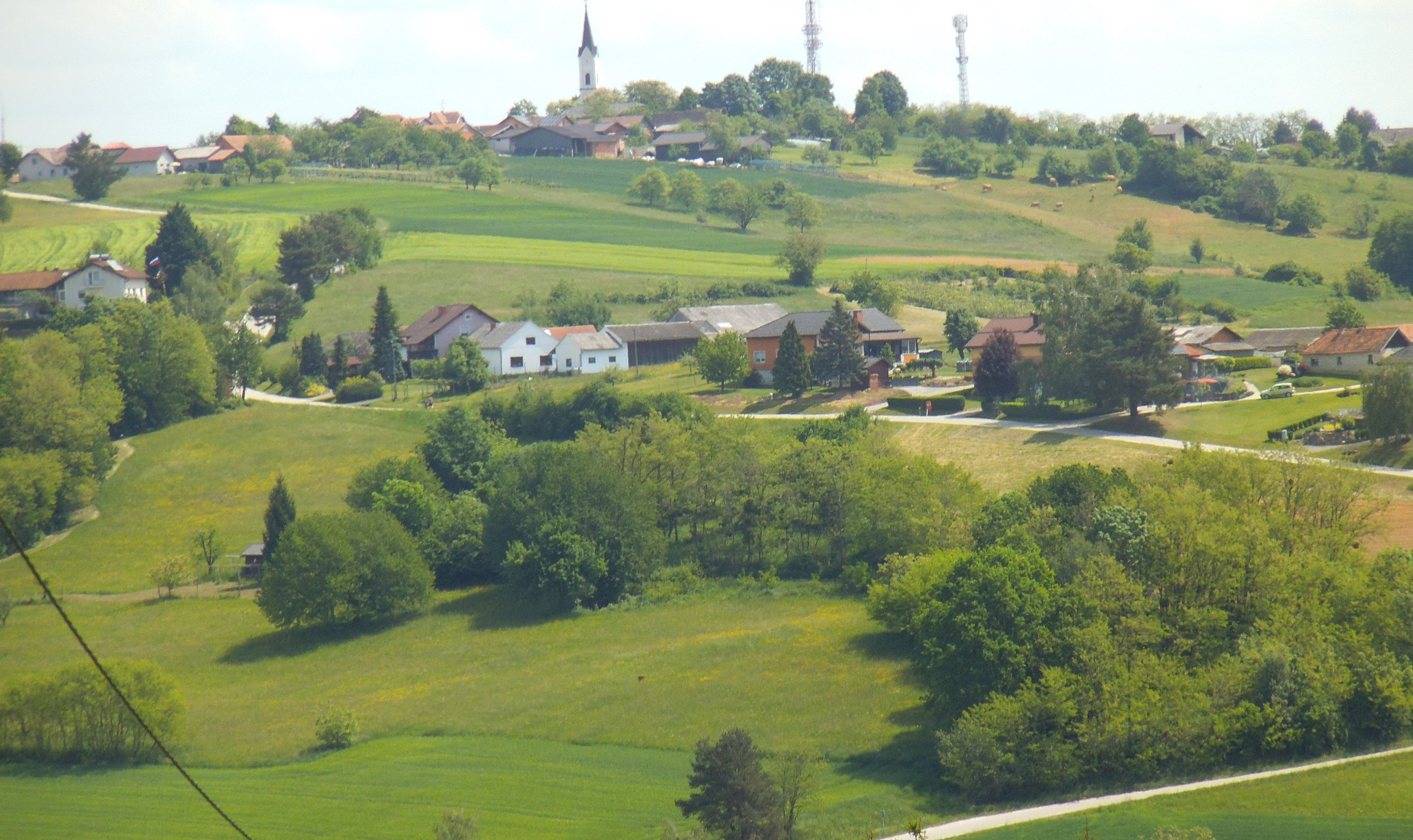

- Location in Slovenia
- Coordinates: 46°44′47.18″N 16°7′58.95″E
- Country: Slovenia
- Traditional region: Prekmurje
- Statistical region: Mura
- Municipality: Puconci

Area
  - Total: 8.11 km^{2} (3.13 sq mi)
- Elevation: 267.2 m (877 ft)

Population (2002)
  - Total: 414

Pečarovci (pronounced [pɛˈtʃaːɾɔu̯tsi]; in older sources also Sveti Sebeštjan, Hungarian: Szentsebestyén, Prekmurje Slovene: Pečörovci) is a village in the Municipality of Puconci in the Prekmurje region of Slovenia.

There are two churches in the settlement. The Roman Catholic parish church is dedicated to Saint Sebastian and was built in 1824. It has a single nave with a polygonal apse and a belfry on its eastern side. It belongs to the Diocese of Murska Sobota. The second church is a Lutheran church built north of the main settlement in the hamlet of Gorenšček.

== Notable people ==
Notable people that were born or lived in Pečarovci include:

- Mihály Bertalanits (1788–1853), poet and teacher
- József Klekl (1874–1948), politician
- Iván Persa (1861–1935), writer
