= Banovci, Veržej =

Banovci
- Location in Slovenia
- Coordinates: 46°34′13.5″N 16°9′51.57″E
- Country: Slovenia
- Traditional region: Styria
- Statistical region: Mura
- Municipality: Veržej

Area
  - Total: 2.64 km^{2} (1.02 sq mi)
- Elevation: 181.7 m (596 ft)

Population (2002)
  - Total: 192

Banovci (pronounced [ˈbaːnɔu̯tsi], German: Wanofzen) is a village in the Municipality of Veržej in northeastern Slovenia. The area is part of the traditional region of Styria. It is now included with the rest of the municipality in the Mura Statistical Region.

It is best known for its spa.
