= Bunčani =

- Location in Slovenia
- Coordinates: 46°35′25″N 16°8′23.84″E
- Country: Slovenia
- Traditional region: Styria
- Statistical region: Mura
- Municipality: Veržej

Area
  - Total: 3.23 km^{2} (1.25 sq mi)
- Elevation: 184.6 m (606 ft)

Population (2002)
  - Total: 206

Bunčani (pronounced [ˈbuːntʃani], German: Wantschen) is a village in the Municipality of Veržej in northeastern Slovenia. The area is part of the traditional region of Styria. It is now included with the rest of the municipality in the Mura Statistical Region.

A small Neo-Gothic chapel with a belfry was built in the settlement in 1890.
