= Trnovski Vrh =

- Location in Slovenia
- Coordinates: 46°30′46.19″N 15°53′3.64″E
- Country: Slovenia
- Traditional region: Styria
- Statistical region: Drava
- Municipality: Trnovska Vas

Area
  - Total: 2.43 km^{2} (0.94 sq mi)
- Elevation: 279.3 m (916 ft)

Population (2002)
  - Total: 134

Trnovski Vrh (pronounced [ˈtəɾnɔu̯ski ˈʋəɾx]) is a settlement in the Slovene Hills (Slovene: Slovenske gorice) in the Municipality of Trnovska Vas in northeastern Slovenia. The area is part of the traditional region of Styria. It is now included in the Drava Statistical Region.

A small chapel-shrine with a wooden belfry in settlement dates to the late 19th century.
