= Veržej =

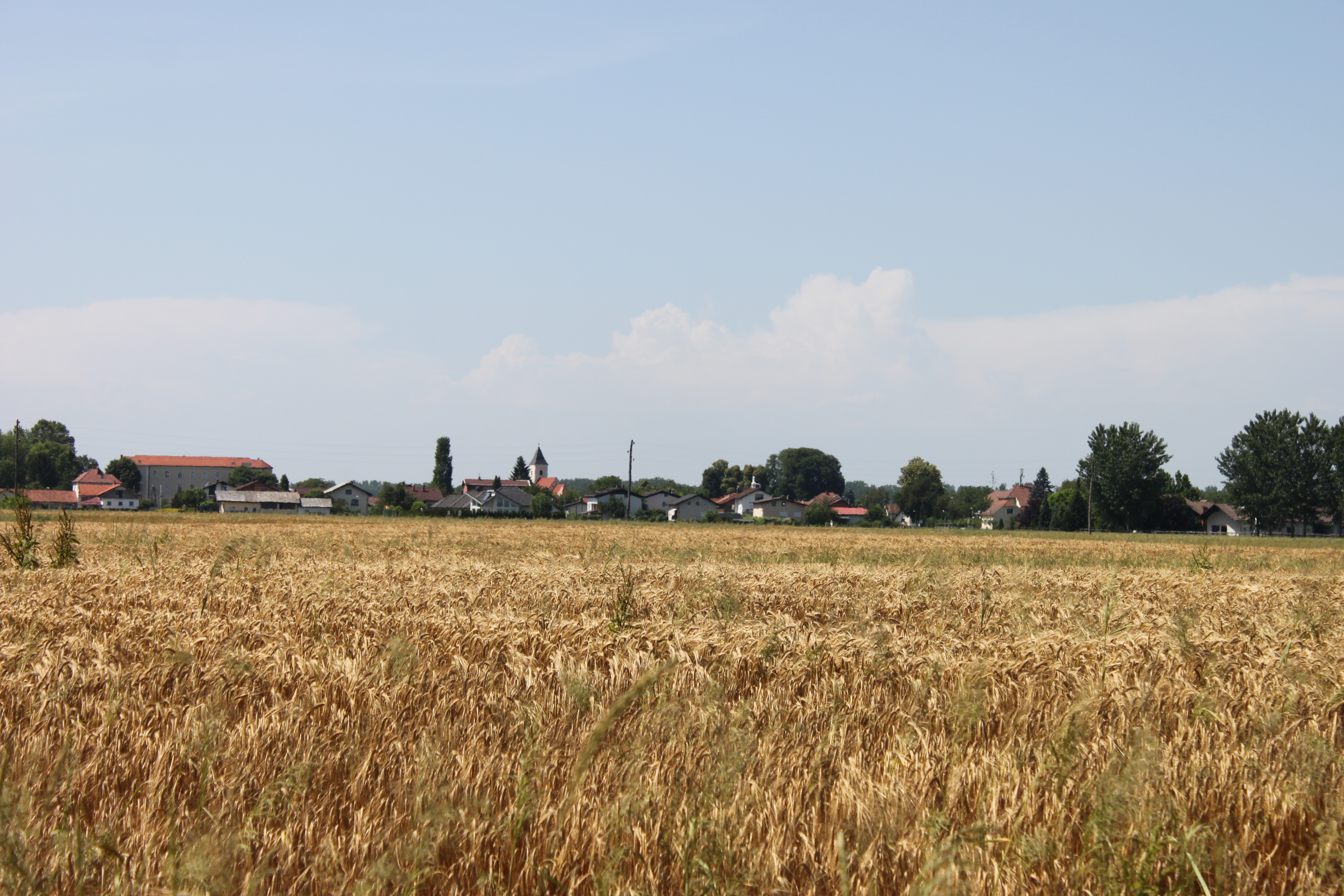

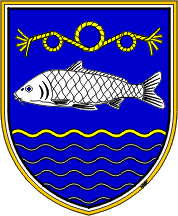
- Coat of arms

- Location in Slovenia
- Coordinates: 46°34′54.32″N 16°9′44.37″E
- Country: Slovenia
- Traditional region: Styria
- Statistical region: Mura
- Municipality: Veržej

Area
  - Total: 6.20 km^{2} (2.39 sq mi)
- Elevation: 182.5 m (599 ft)

Population (2012)
  - Total: 900

Veržej (pronounced [ʋɛɾˈʒeːi̯]) is a settlement in northeastern Slovenia. It is the seat of the Municipality of Veržej. It lies on the right bank of the Mura River. The area is part of the traditional region of Styria. The municipality is now included in the Mura Statistical Region. It was known for fields of white narcisi that bloom in the area in springtime.

== Name ==
Veržej was attested in historical sources as Schepfendorf in 1280–95, Wernse in 1354, and Werensee in 1445, among other names and spellings. The name may be derived from Middle High German Wernsee, a compound of were 'entrenchment' and sê 'lake'. A less likely hypothesis connects the name with a Balto-Slavic root related to Lithuanian viržis 'heather'.

== Church ==
The parish church in the settlement is dedicated to Saint Michael and belongs to the Roman Catholic Diocese of Murska Sobota. It was built in the early 18th century on the site of an older wooden church. It was renovated between 2007 and 2008 and a new chapel was added to the building.

== Notable people ==
Notable people that were born or lived in Veržej include:

- Slavko Osterc (1895–1941), composer
