= Sara Žibrat =

Slovenian politician (born 1992)

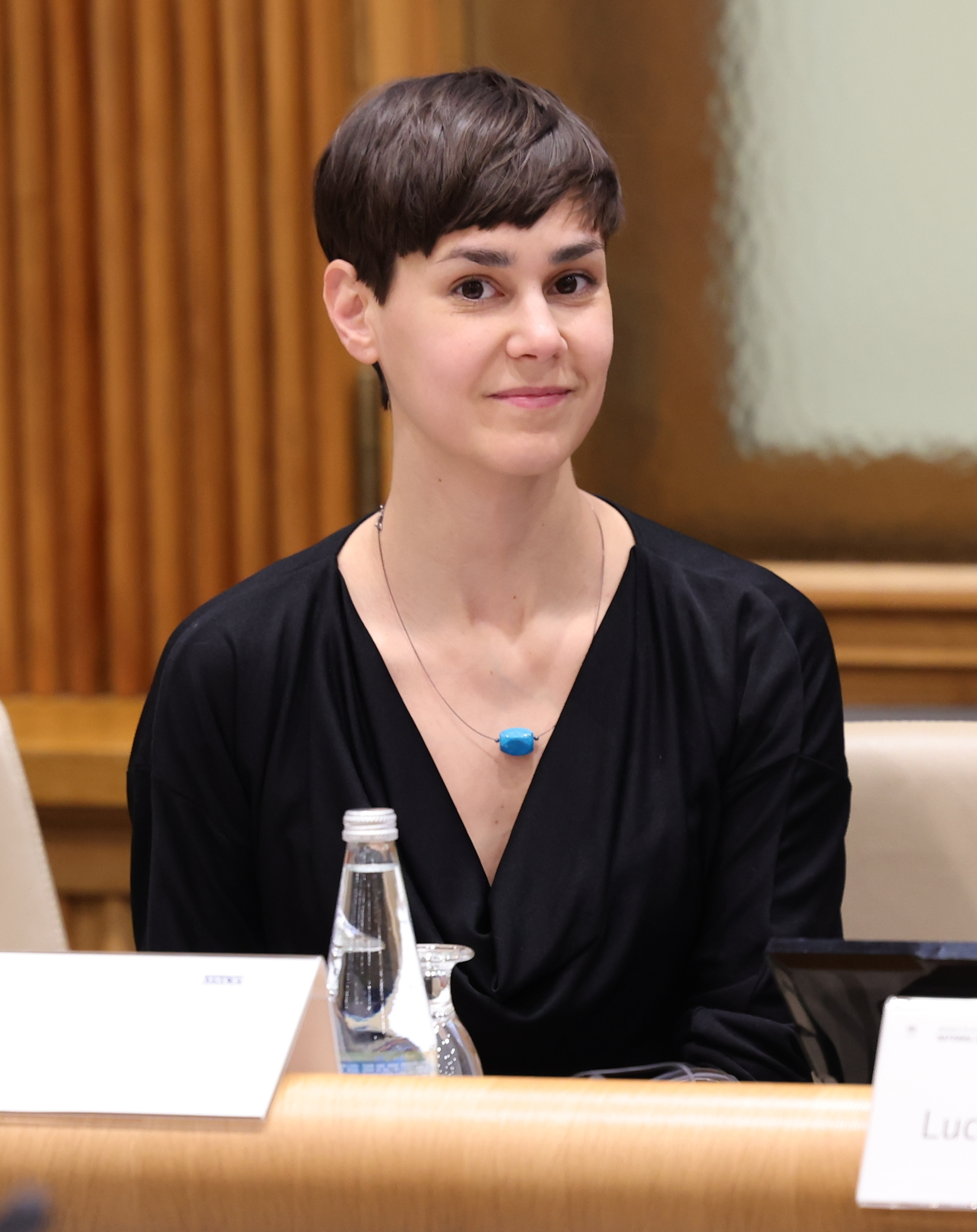
- Žibrat in 2025

Member of the National Assembly
- Incumbent
- Assumed office 13 May 2022
- Constituency: Ptuj – Ljutomer

Personal details
- Born: 16 May 1992 (age 33)
- Party: Freedom Movement (since 2022)

Sara Žibrat (born 16 May 1992) is a Slovenian politician serving as a member of the National Assembly since 2022. She has served as vice president of the Freedom Movement since 2023.
