= Melinci =

- Location in Slovenia
- Coordinates: 46°34′21.26″N 16°14′17.75″E
- Country: Slovenia
- Traditional region: Prekmurje
- Statistical region: Mura
- Municipality: Beltinci

Area
  - Total: 6.78 km^{2} (2.62 sq mi)
- Elevation: 175.6 m (576 ft)

Population (2019)
  - Total: 769
  - Density: 113/km^{2} (294/sq mi)

Melinci (pronounced [mɛˈliːntsi]; Hungarian: Muramelence) is a village in the Municipality of Beltinci in the Prekmurje region of northeastern Slovenia.

== Name ==
Melinci was attested in historical documents in 1322 as Hmelnice and Hmeliniche (and as Hmelinica in 1379). The name is derived from the Slovene common noun hmelj 'hops'.

== Cultural heritage ==
There is a small chapel in the settlement. It is dedicated to Our Lady of the Snows and belongs to the Parish of Beltinci.

== The Martyr of Melinci ==
A folk story called "The Martyr of Melinci" (Mälìnčki mantrník) collected by the Prekmurje Slovene writer Števan Kühar (1882–1915) describes how the Mura River was in flood and threatened to destroy the village. The men of the village gathered together and decided to bury alive a seven-year-old child, Števek from the Džuro farm (Džúrov Štèväk or Džurof Štefek) as a sacrifice to appease the river. After that the river never again flooded like it had before. The legend continues that the boy appeared in a dream to a pious woman, urging her to ask the village authorities to dig him up. This was permitted, but only a few shovels of soil had been turned before a powerful smell emanated from the earth. The officers of the parish then forbade the martyr to be disinterred. After this it was said that a light would appear at the place where Števek had been buried.
