= Sovjak, Trnovska Vas =

Sovjak
- Location in Slovenia
- Coordinates: 46°31′48.52″N 15°52′2.7″E
- Country: Slovenia
- Traditional region: Styria
- Statistical region: Drava
- Municipality: Trnovska Vas

Area
  - Total: 0.92 km^{2} (0.36 sq mi)
- Elevation: 263.2 m (864 ft)

Population (2002)
  - Total: 81

Sovjak (pronounced [ˈsoːu̯jak]) is a small settlement in the Municipality of Trnovska Vas in northeastern Slovenia. It lies in the hills just west of Biš. The area is part of the traditional region of Styria. It is now included in the Drava Statistical Region.
