= Dokležovje =

- St. Stephen's parish church, Dokležovje

- Location in Slovenia
- Coordinates: 46°36′3.65″N 16°10′21.19″E
- Country: Slovenia
- Traditional region: Prekmurje
- Statistical region: Mura
- Municipality: Beltinci

Area
  - Total: 5.277 km^{2} (2.037 sq mi)
- Elevation: 182.9 m (600 ft)

Population (2026)
  - Total: 852
  - Density: 162/km^{2} (420/sq mi)

Dokležovje (pronounced [dɔˈkleːʒɔu̯jɛ]; Hungarian: Murahely or Deklezs, Prekmurje Slovene: Dekležovje, German: Neufellsdorf) is a village in the Municipality of Beltinci in the Prekmurje region of northeastern Slovenia. In January 2026, the population was 852.

The parish church in the settlement is dedicated to Saint Stephen. It was built in 1844 and belongs to the Roman Catholic Diocese of Murska Sobota.
