= Ižakovci =

Ižakovci Ižekovci
- Location in Slovenia
- Coordinates: 46°35′7.41″N 16°12′44.66″E
- Country: Slovenia
- Traditional region: Prekmurje
- Statistical region: Mura
- Municipality: Beltinci

Area
  - Total: 8.615 km^{2} (3.326 sq mi)
- Elevation: 179.4 m (589 ft)

Population (2026)
  - Total: 719
  - Density: 84/km^{2} (220/sq mi)

Ižakovci (pronounced [ˈiːʒakou̯tsi]; Prekmurje Slovene: Ižekovci, Hungarian: Murasziget) is a village on the left bank of the Mura River in the Municipality of Beltinci in the Prekmurje region of northeastern Slovenia.In January 2026, the population was 719.

== Name ==
Ižakovci was attested in written sources in 1322 as Isakouc and Isacoush (and as Isakolch in 1381 and Isakowlch in 1428). The name of the settlement is derived from personal name Izak 'Isaac' and is a demonym meaning 'inhabitants of Isaac's village'. The phonemic change -z- > -ž- indicates that the Slovenian name developed through an intermediate German form.

== Cultural heritage ==
There is a chapel in the centre of the village. It is dedicated to Our Lady of Mount Carmel and belongs to the Parish of Beltinci.

== Notable people ==
Notable people that were born or lived in Ižakovci include:

- Iván Persa (1861–1935), writer
- Bertalan Koczuván (1828–1889), writer and teacher

== Bibliography ==
- Jakopin, Franc (1985). Sluga, Meta (ed.). Slovenska krajevna imena. Ljubljana: Cankarjeva založba.
