= Mihály Bertalanits =

Slovenian writer

- Born: November 8, 1788; Gerečavci
- Died: January 8, 1853 (aged 64)
- Occupation: Teacher

Mihály Bertalanits (Slovene: Mihael Bertalanitš, Prekmurje Slovene: Miháo Bertalanitš) (November 8, 1788 – January 8, 1853) was a Slovene cantor, teacher, and poet in Hungary.

Beralanits was the son of the peasants György Bertalanics and Katarina (unknown surname) and was born in the village of Gerečavci, now a hamlet of Sveti Jurij near Rogašovci. In 1806 he became an auxiliary teacher in Beltinci and in 1808 a teacher in Felsőszölnök. There he met an auxiliary teacher named Ferenc Marics and his father, György, the teacher and cantor of Apátistvánfalva, who was also born in Gerečavci.

Together, Bertalanits and Marics copied and reworked the Prekmurje Slovene hymnal of cantor-teacher Ruzsics. Marics used this hymnal in Istvánfalva and Bertalanits in Pečarovci, where he lived until his death from pneumonia in 1853.

== See also ==
- List of Slovene writers and poets in Hungary

== Literature ==
- Francek Mukič – Marija Kozar: Slovensko Porabje, Mohorjeva družba Celje, 1982.
