= Gančani =

- Location in Slovenia
- Coordinates: 46°37′47.99″N 16°14′51.44″E
- Country: Slovenia
- Traditional region: Prekmurje
- Statistical region: Mura
- Municipality: Beltinci

Area
  - Total: 13.586 km^{2} (5.246 sq mi)
- Elevation: 178.6 m (586 ft)

Population (2026)
  - Total: 984
  - Density: 72/km^{2} (190/sq mi)

Gančani (pronounced [ˈɡaːntʃani]; Hungarian: Lendvarózsavölgy) is a village in the Municipality of Beltinci in the Prekmurje region of northeastern Slovenia. In January 2026, the population was 984.

There is a chapel with a two-storey belfry in the centre of the village. It is dedicated to the Sacred Heart of Jesus and belongs to the Parish of Beltinci.
