= Damijan Zrim =

Slovenian politician (born 1993)

Member of the National Assembly
- Incumbent
- Assumed office 13 May 2022
- Constituency: Ptuj – Murska Sobota 1

Personal details
- Born: 12 May 1993 (age 32)
- Party: Social Democrats

Damijan Bezjak Zrim (born 12 May 1993) is a Slovenian politician serving as a member of the National Assembly since 2022. From 2018 to 2022, he was a municipal councillor of Kuzma.
