= Municipality of Odranci =

Municipality of Slovenia

Municipality of Odranci Občina Odranci
- Municipality
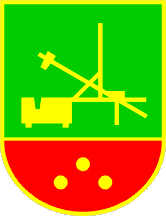
- Coat of arms

- Location of the Municipality of Odranci in Slovenia
- Coordinates: 46°35′N 16°16′E
- Country: Slovenia

Government
  - Mayor: Barbara Ferenčak (Independent)

Area
  - Total: 6.9 km^{2} (2.7 sq mi)

Population (2018)
  - Total: 1,633
  - Density: 240/km^{2} (610/sq mi)
- Time zone: UTC+01 (CET)
  - Summer (DST): UTC+02 (CEST)
- Website: www.odranci.si

The Municipality of Odranci (pronounced [ɔˈdɾaːntsi]; Slovene: Občina Odranci) is a municipality in the traditional region of Prekmurje in northeastern Slovenia. Its seat and only settlement is Odranci. It was formed in 1994, when it was split from the Municipality of Lendava.

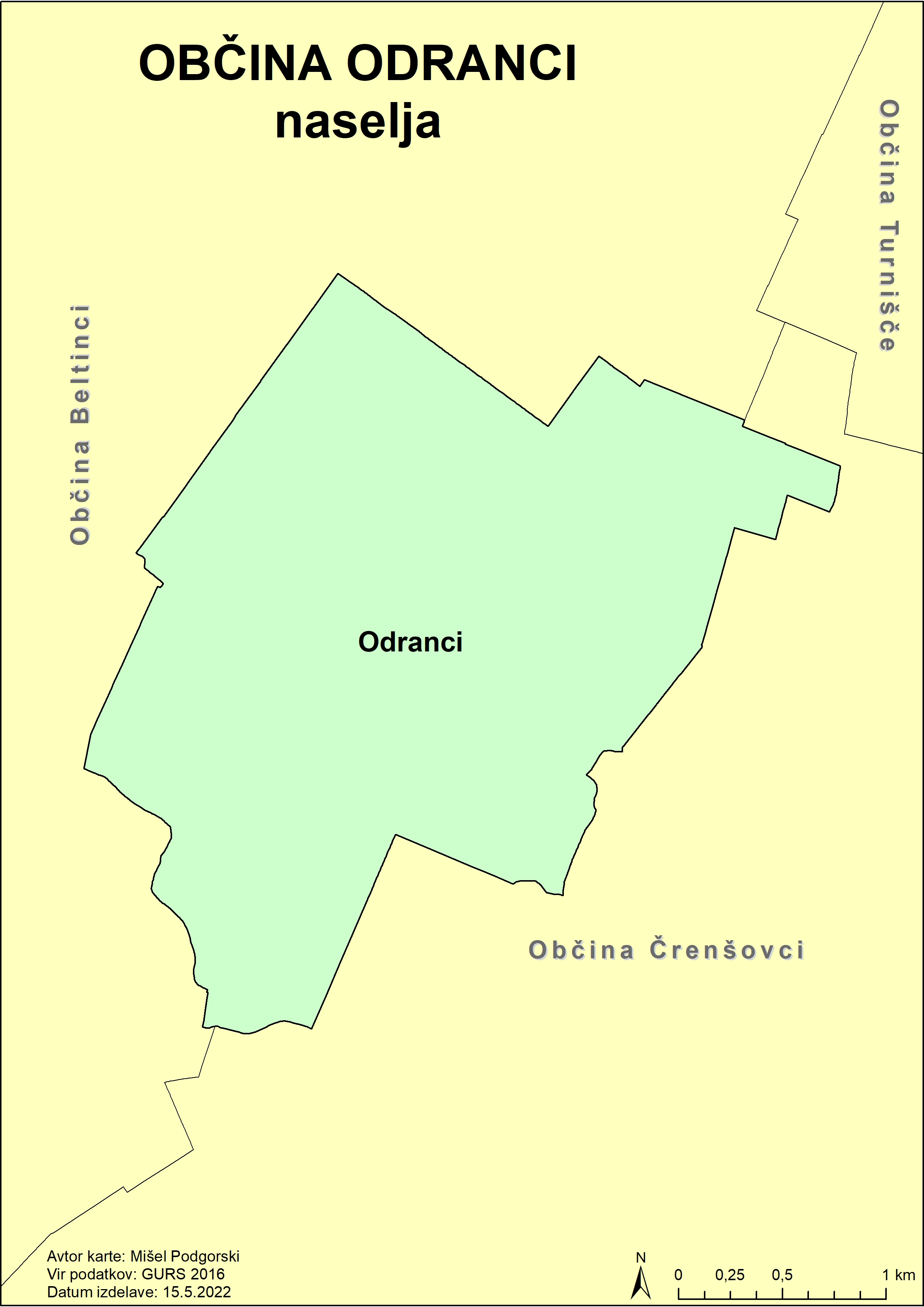
The sole village in the municipality

== Flag ==
The flag and coat of arms of Odranci were adopted by the municipal authorities and published in the Official Gazette of the Republic of Slovenia in 1998. The flag is rectangular, with a ratio of 1:2, vertically divided into three equal green, yellow, and red stripes, with the coat of arms set in the middle stripe. There is also a version for vertical hoisting, with the coat of arms rotated.
