= Sovljak =

Sovljak may refer to:

- Sovljak, Bogatić, a village in Serbia
- Sovljak, Ub, a village in Serbia
