= Kupšinci =

Kupšinci Küpšinci
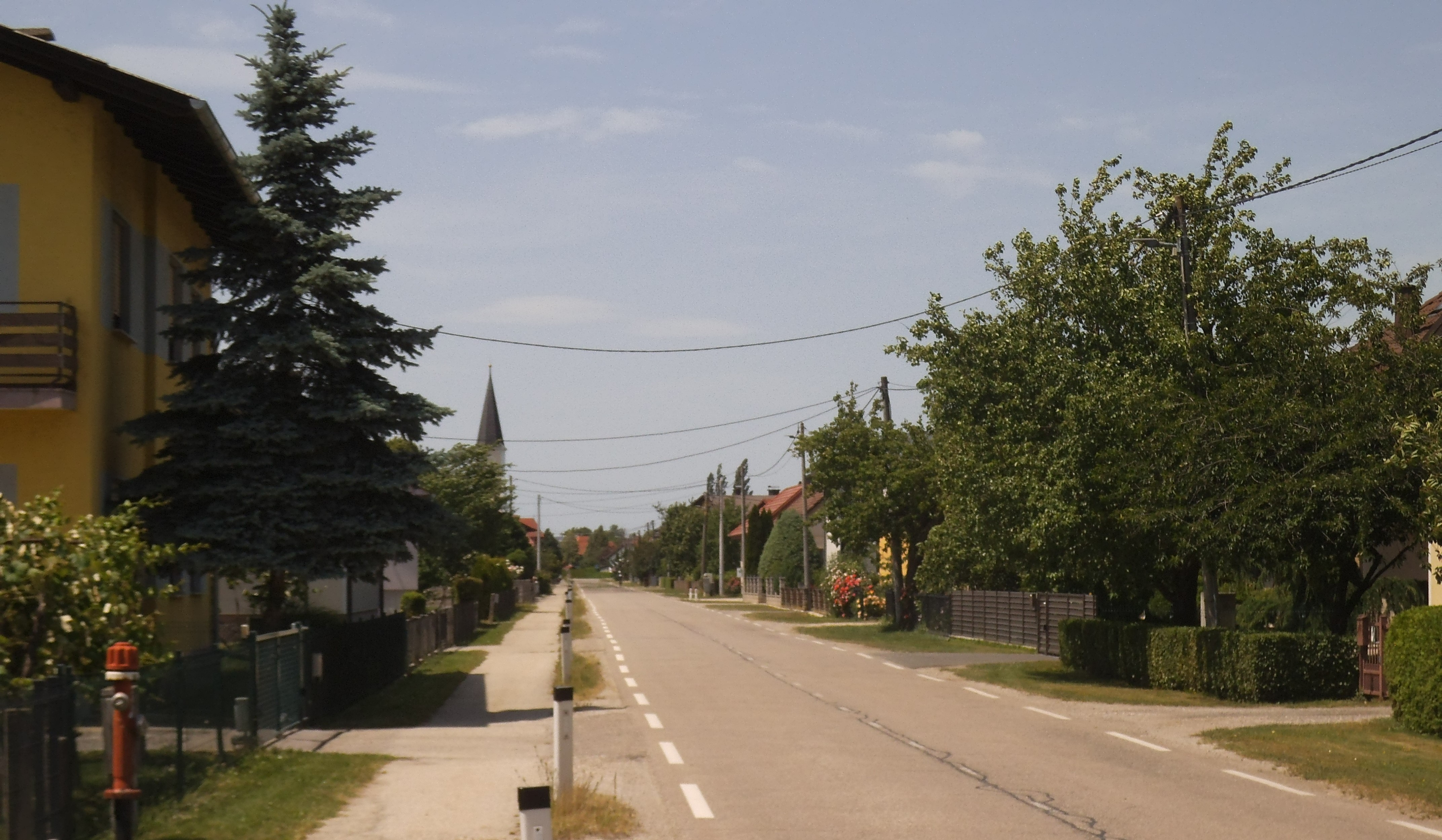

- Location in Slovenia
- Coordinates: 46°40′20″N 16°7′0″E
- Country: Slovenia
- Traditional region: Prekmurje
- Statistical region: Mura
- Municipality: Murska Sobota

Area
  - Total: 5.83 km^{2} (2.25 sq mi)
- Elevation: 194.6 m (638 ft)

Population (2002)
  - Total: 361

Kupšinci (pronounced [kuˈpʃiːntsi]; Hungarian: Murahalmos, Prekmurje Slovene: Küpšinci) is a village in the Municipality of Murska Sobota in the Prekmurje region of northeastern Slovenia.

== Chapel ==
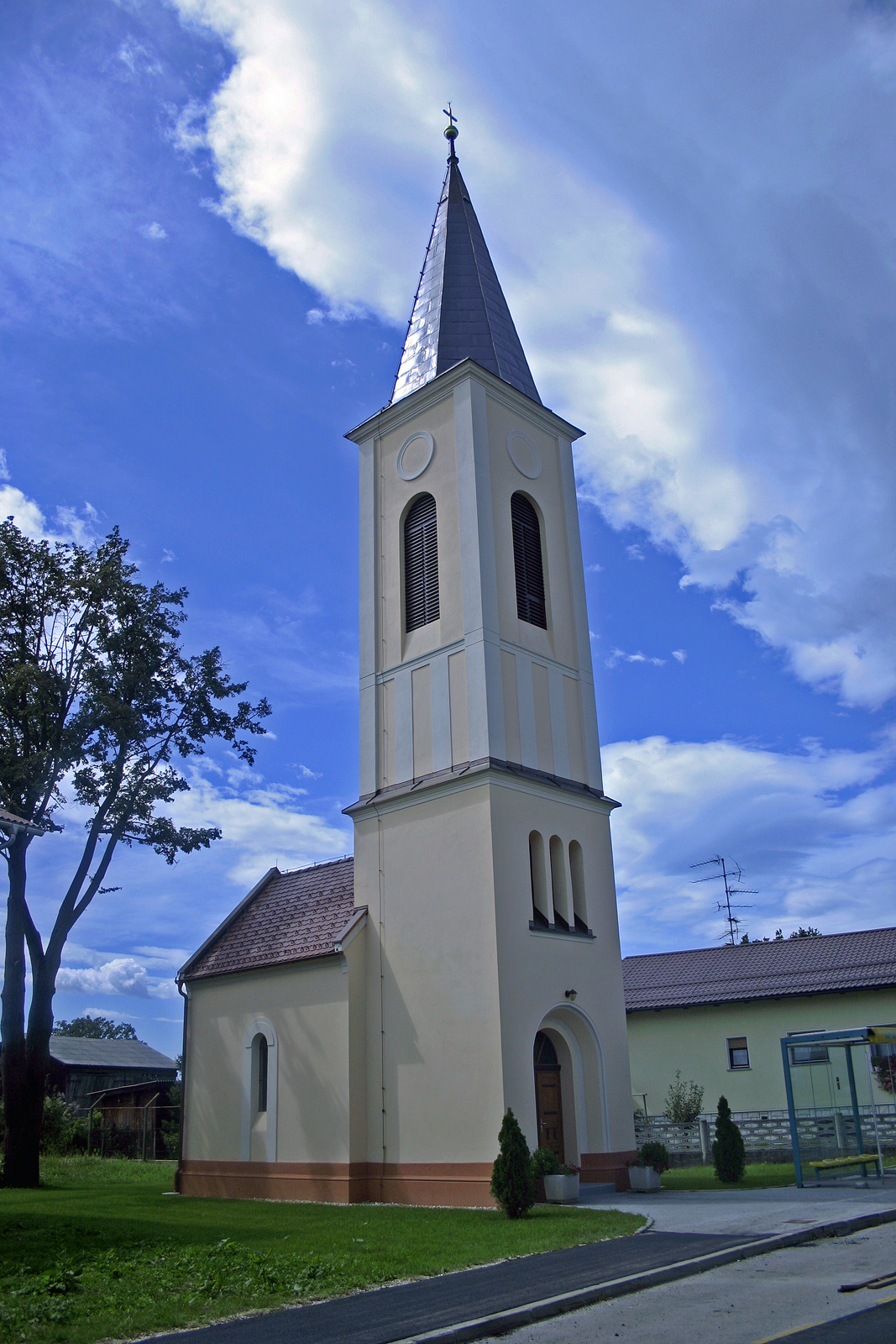
Lutheran chapel

There is a Lutheran chapel in the settlement. It was built in the early 20th century in a Neo-Romanesque style with a three-storey belfry.
