= Municipality of Veržej =

Municipality of Slovenia

Municipality of Veržej Občina Veržej
- Municipality
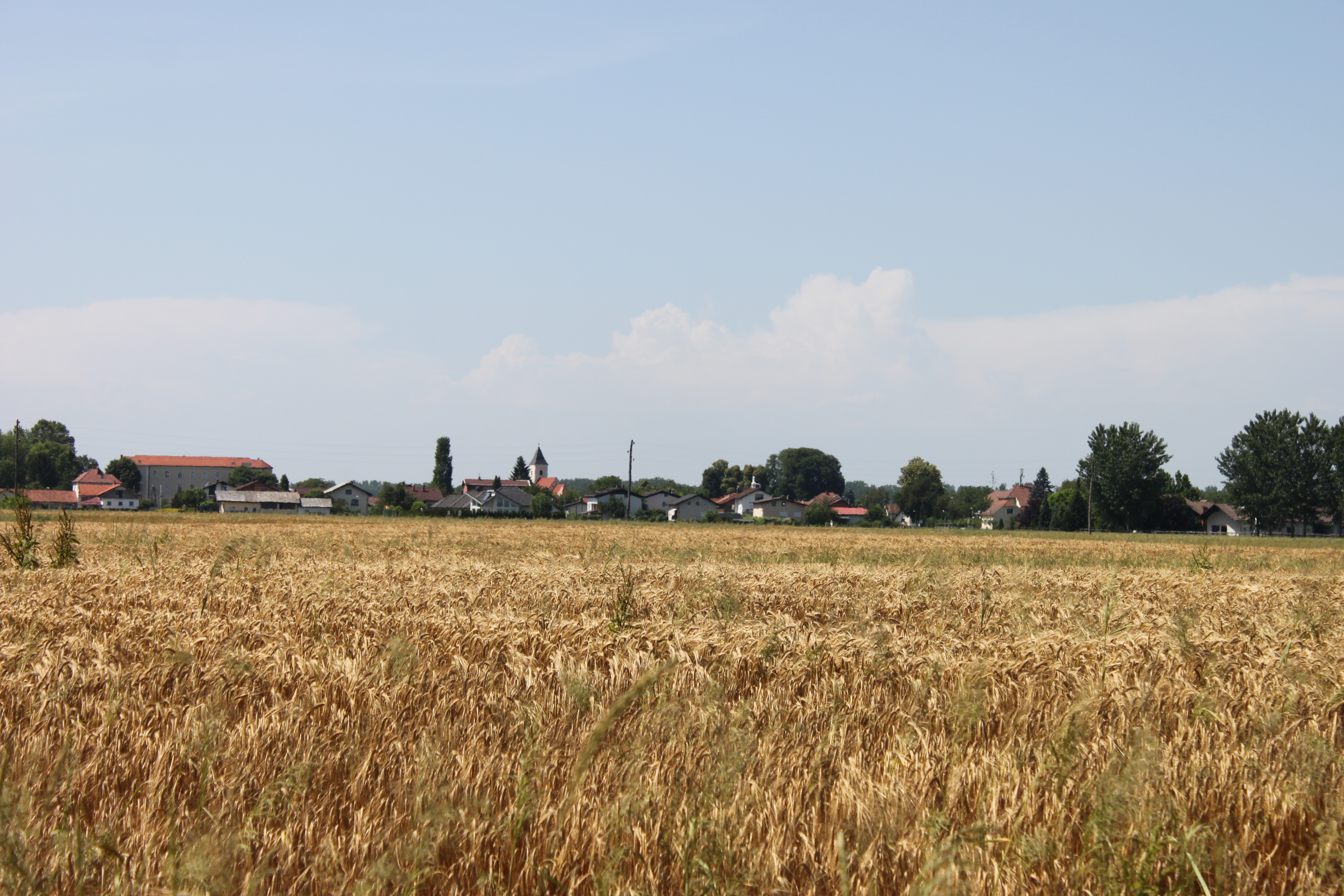

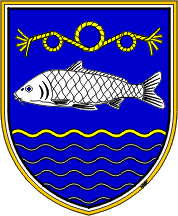
- Coat of arms

- Location of the Municipality of Veržej in Slovenia
- Coordinates: 46°35′N 16°10′E
- Country: Slovenia

Government
  - Mayor: Slavko Petovar

Area
  - Total: 12.0 km^{2} (4.6 sq mi)

Population (2002)
  - Total: 1,354
  - Density: 113/km^{2} (292/sq mi)
- Time zone: UTC+01 (CET)
  - Summer (DST): UTC+02 (CEST)
- Website: www.verzej.si

The Municipality of Veržej (pronounced [ʋɛɾˈʒeːi̯]; Slovene: Občina Veržej) is a small municipality in northeastern Slovenia. The seat of the municipality is the town of Veržej. It lies on the right bank of the Mura River. The area is part of the traditional region of Styria. The municipality is now included in the Mura Statistical Region. It is known for fields of white narcisi that bloom in the area in springtime.

== Settlements ==
In addition to the municipal seat of Veržej, the municipality also includes the settlements of Banovci and Bunčani.
