= Biš =

- Location in Slovenia
- Coordinates: 46°31′58.51″N 15°50′43.55″E
- Country: Slovenia
- Traditional region: Styria
- Statistical region: Drava
- Municipality: Trnovska Vas

Area
  - Total: 6.9 km^{2} (2.7 sq mi)
- Elevation: 330.9 m (1,086 ft)

Population (2002)
  - Total: 196

Biš (pronounced [ˈbiːʃ]) is a village in the Municipality of Trnovska Vas in northeastern Slovenia. It lies on the regional road from Lenart to Ptuj. The area is part of the traditional region of Styria. It is now included in the Drava Statistical Region.

The chapel with a belfry in the centre of the village dates to 1888.

A Roman period burial ground with four now destroyed burial mounds has been identified near the settlement.
