= Suzana Lep Šimenko =

Slovenian politician (born 1979)

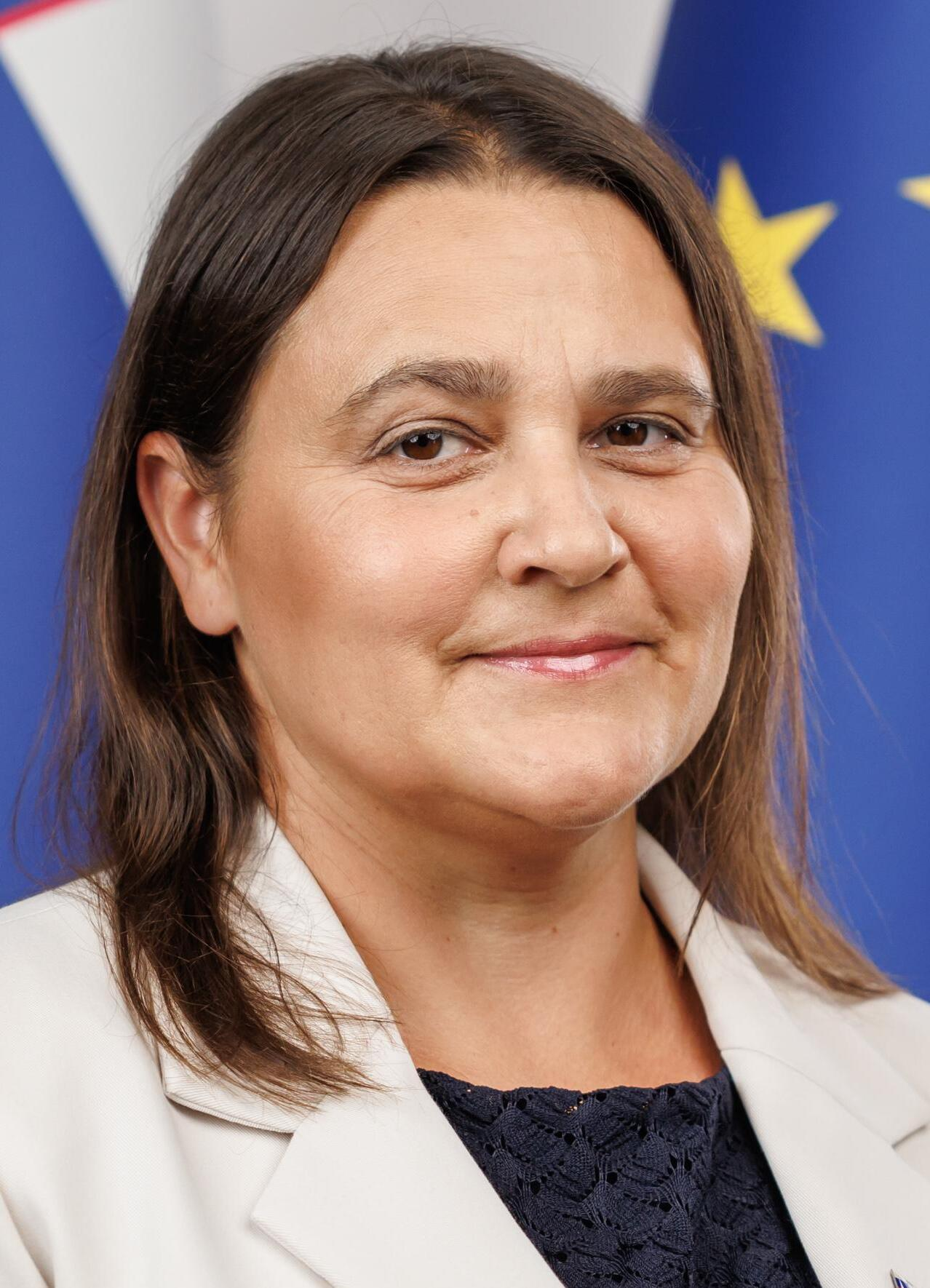
- Official portrait, 2026

Member of the National Assembly
- Incumbent
- Assumed office 1 August 2014
- Constituency: Ptuj – Ptuj III

Personal details
- Born: 30 October 1979 (age 46)
- Party: Slovenian Democratic Party

Suzana Lep Šimenko (born 30 October 1979) is a Slovenian politician serving as a member of the National Assembly since 2014. From 2020 to 2022, she was a member of the Parliamentary Assembly of the Council of Europe. She is the current Minister without portfolio for Relations between the Republic of Slovenia and the Autochthonous Slovenian National Community in Neighbouring Countries, and between the Republic of Slovenia and Slovenians Abroad.
