= Municipality of Trnovska Vas =

Municipality of Slovenia

Municipality of Trnovska Vas Občina Trnovska vas
- Municipality
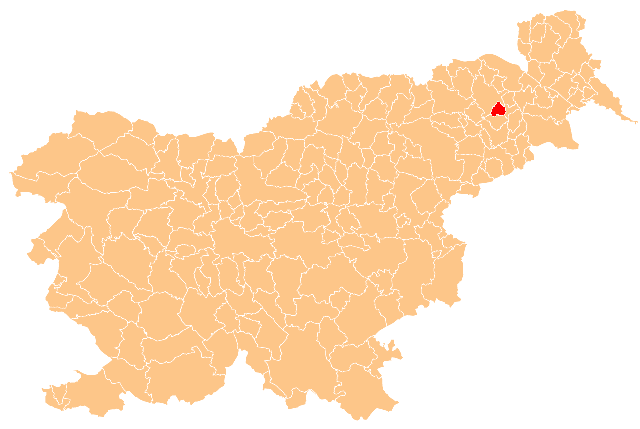
- Location of the Municipality of Trnovska Vas in Slovenia
- Coordinates: 46°31′N 15°54′E
- Country: Slovenia

Government
  - Mayor: Alojz Benko

Area
  - Total: 22.9 km^{2} (8.8 sq mi)

Population (2002)
  - Total: 1,208
  - Density: 52.8/km^{2} (137/sq mi)
- Time zone: UTC+01 (CET)
  - Summer (DST): UTC+02 (CEST)
- Website: www.trnovska-vas.si

The Municipality of Trnovska Vas (pronounced [ˈtəɾnɔu̯ska ˈʋaːs]; Slovene: Občina Trnovska vas) is a municipality in northeastern Slovenia. The seat of the municipality is the settlement of Trnovska Vas. The area is part of the traditional region of Styria. It is now included in the Drava Statistical Region.

== Settlements ==
In addition to the namesake town, the municipality also includes the following settlements:

- Biš
- Bišečki Vrh
- Črmlja
- Ločič
- Sovjak
- Trnovski Vrh
