= Nemčavci =

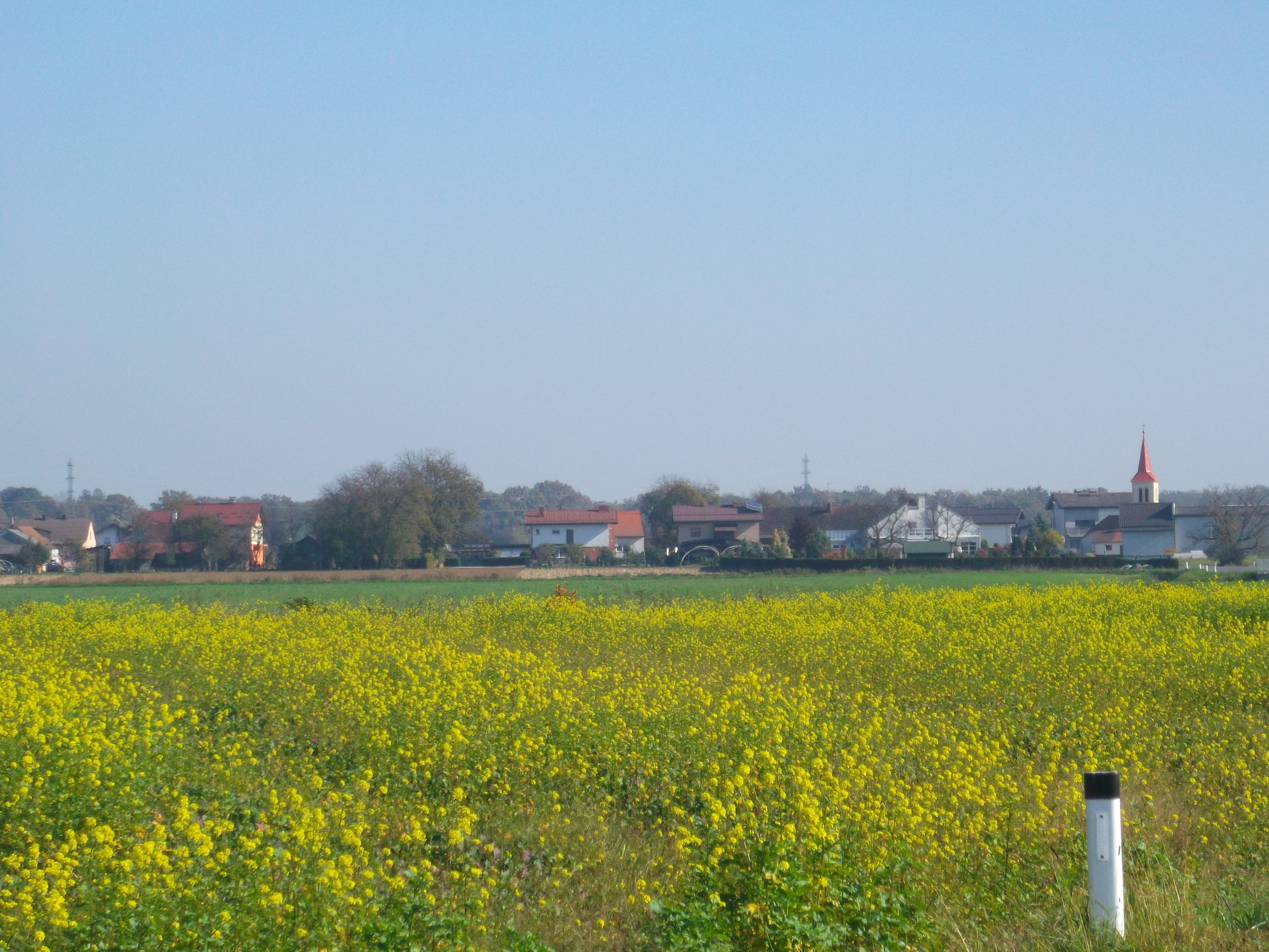

- Location in Slovenia
- Coordinates: 46°40′51″N 16°10′35″E
- Country: Slovenia
- Traditional region: Prekmurje
- Statistical region: Mura
- Municipality: Murska Sobota

Area
  - Total: 3.25 km^{2} (1.25 sq mi)
- Elevation: 192.5 m (632 ft)

Population (2002)
  - Total: 267

Nemčavci (pronounced [ˈneːmtʃau̯tsi], Hungarian: Lendvanemesd) is a village north of Murska Sobota in the Prekmurje region of Slovenia.
