= Markišavci =

- Location in Slovenia
- Coordinates: 46°40′58″N 16°9′49″E
- Country: Slovenia
- Traditional region: Prekmurje
- Statistical region: Mura
- Municipality: Murska Sobota

Area
  - Total: 2.92 km^{2} (1.13 sq mi)
- Elevation: 193.8 m (636 ft)

Population (2002)
  - Total: 160

Markišavci (pronounced [ˈmaːɾkiʃau̯tsi]; Hungarian: Márkusháza) is a village immediately north of Murska Sobota in the Prekmurje region of Slovenia.
