= Trnovska Vas =

Trnovska Vas Trnovska vas
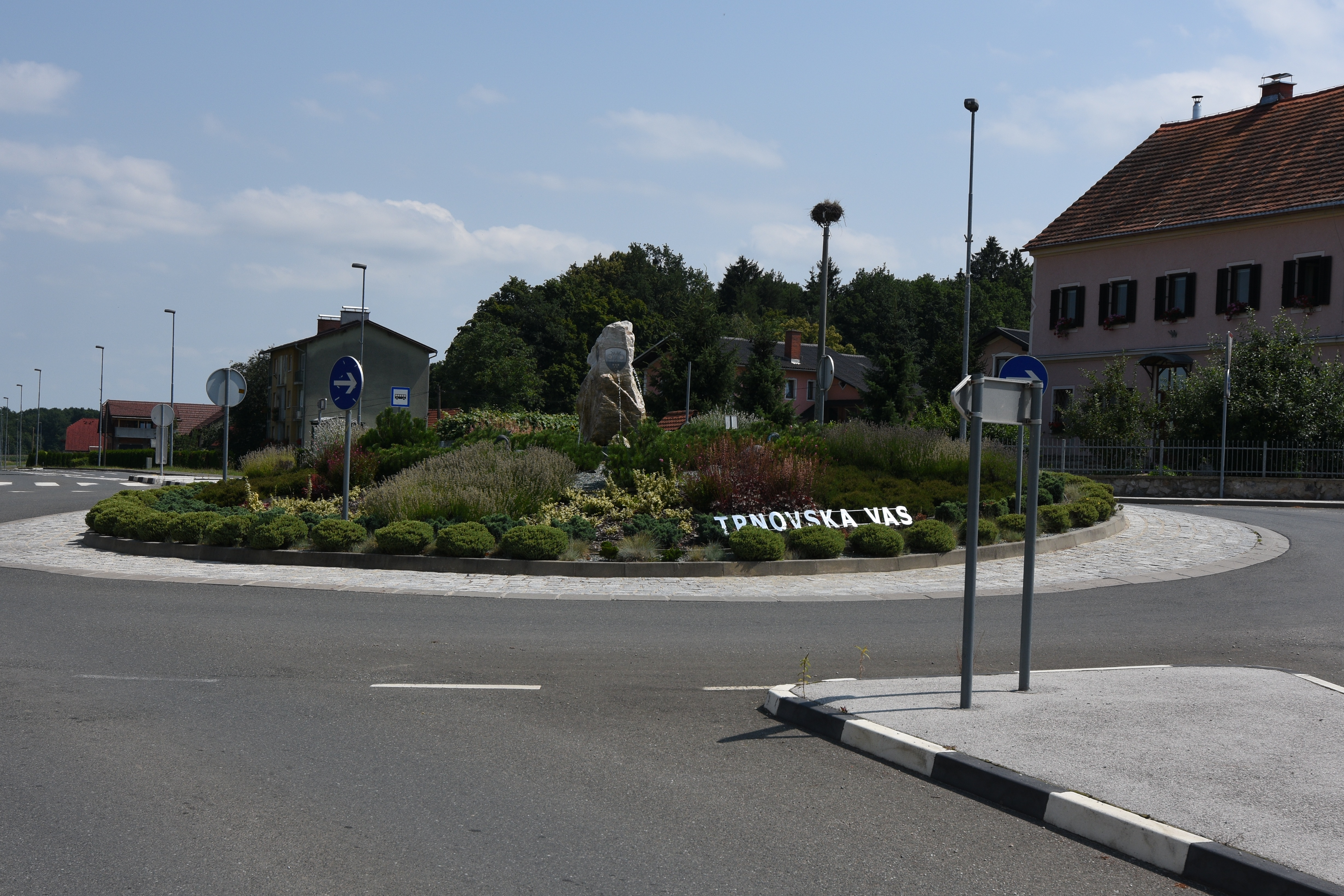

- Location in Slovenia
- Coordinates: 46°31′23.06″N 15°53′52.10″E
- Country: Slovenia
- Traditional region: Styria
- Statistical region: Drava
- Municipality: Trnovska Vas

Area
  - Total: 5.7 km^{2} (2.2 sq mi)
- Elevation: 229.7 m (754 ft)

Population (2012)
  - Total: 369

Trnovska Vas (pronounced [ˈtəɾnɔu̯ska ˈʋaːs]; Slovene: Trnovska vas) is a settlement in the Municipality of Trnovska Vas in northeastern Slovenia. It is the seat of the municipality. The area is part of the traditional region of Styria. It is now included in the Drava Statistical Region. The settlement lies on the regional road from Ptuj to Lenart v Slovenskih Goricah in the Pesnica Valley.

The local parish church is dedicated to Saint Wolfgang and belongs to the Roman Catholic Archdiocese of Maribor. It dates to the 18th century.
