= Municipality of Beltinci =

Municipality of Slovenia

Municipality of Beltinci Občina Beltinci
- Municipality
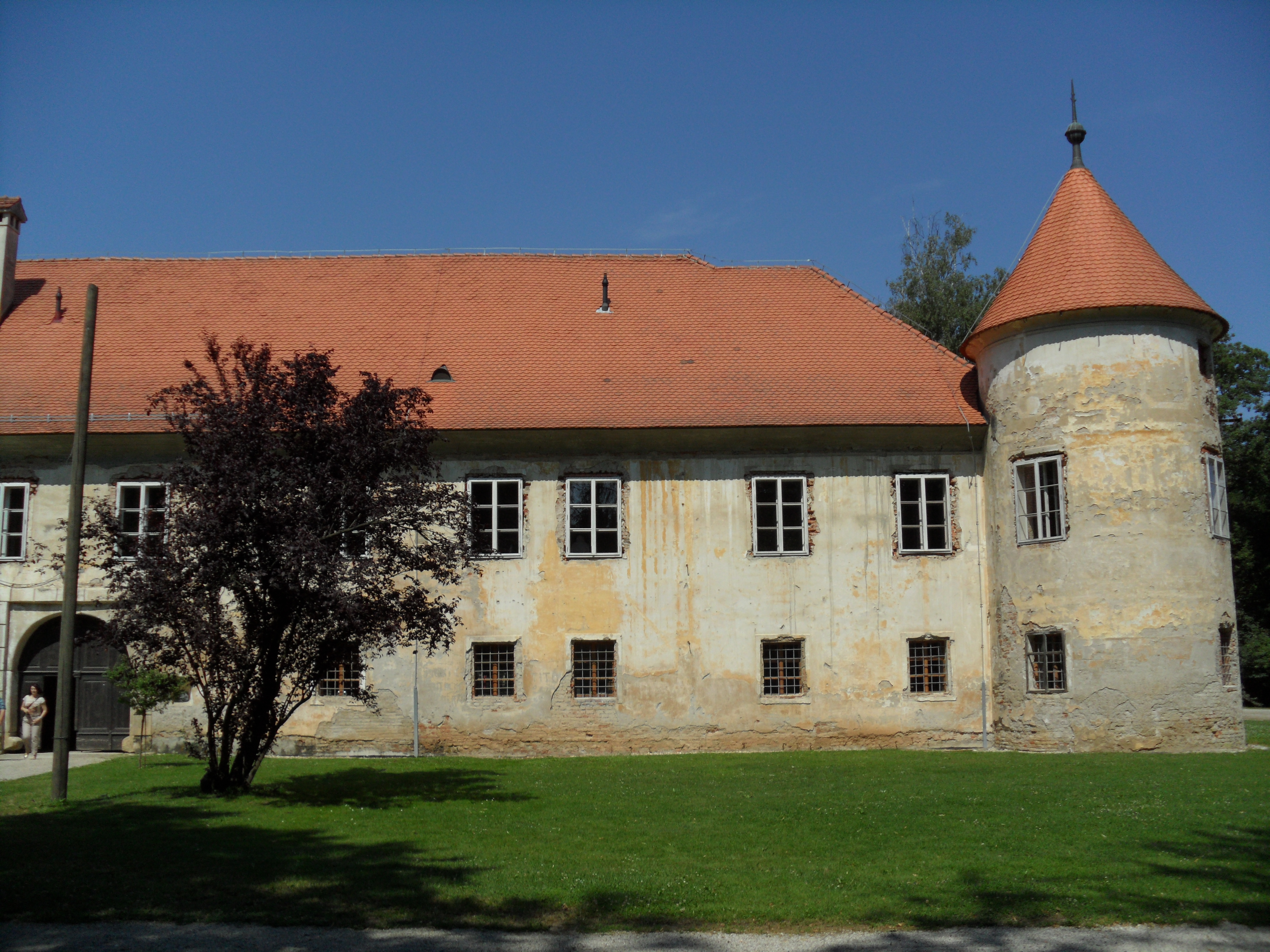

- Flag Coat of arms

- Location of the Municipality of Beltinci in Slovenia
- Coordinates: 46°36′N 16°14′E
- Country: Slovenia

Government
  - Mayor: Marko Virag (Independent)

Area
  - Total: 62.2 km^{2} (24.0 sq mi)
- Elevation: 177 m (581 ft)

Population (2002)
  - Total: 8,256
  - Density: 133/km^{2} (344/sq mi)
- Time zone: UTC+01 (CET)
  - Summer (DST): UTC+02 (CEST)
- Postal code: 9231
- Vehicle registration: MS
- Website: www.beltinci.si

The Municipality of Beltinci (pronounced [ˈbeːltintsi]; Slovene: Občina Beltinci) is a municipality in the Prekmurje region of northeastern Slovenia. Its seat is the settlement of Beltinci. The municipality has 8,256 inhabitants. It was a sanjak under the name Balatin that initially belonged to the Budin Eyalet, and later the Kanije Eyalet, during Ottoman rule before the Treaty of Karlowitz.

== Settlements ==
In addition to the municipal seat of Beltinci, the municipality also includes the following settlements:

- Bratonci
- Dokležovje
- Gančani
- Ižakovci
- Lipa
- Lipovci
- Melinci
