= Satahovci =

Satahovci Setovci (locally)
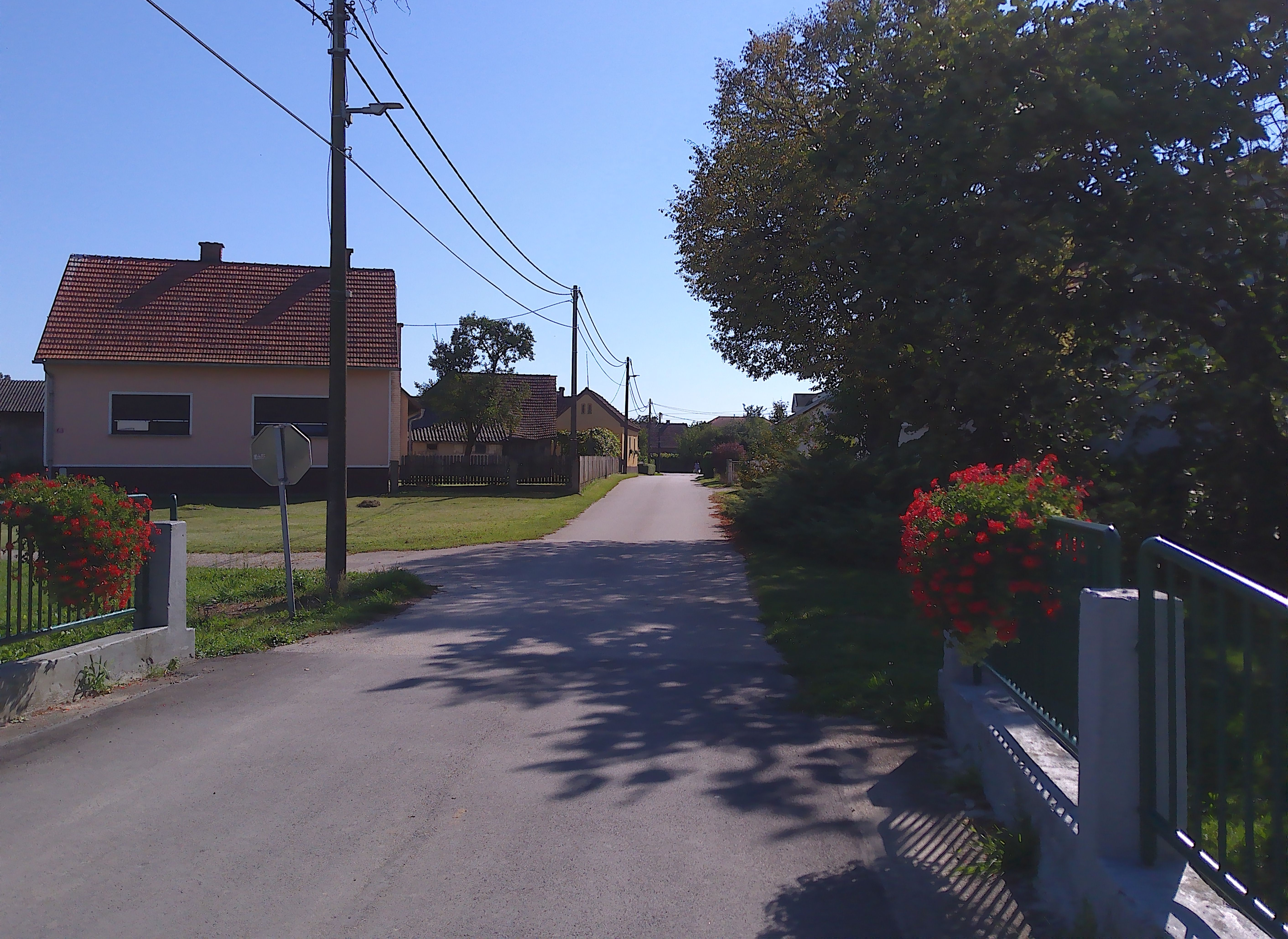

- Location in Slovenia
- Coordinates: 46°37′55″N 16°7′2″E
- Country: Slovenia
- Traditional region: Prekmurje
- Statistical region: Mura
- Municipality: Murska Sobota

Area
  - Total: 3.64 km^{2} (1.41 sq mi)
- Elevation: 191.7 m (629 ft)

Population (2002)
  - Total: 310

Satahovci (pronounced [sataˈxoːu̯tsi]; Hungarian: Muraszentes) is a village in the Municipality of Murska Sobota in the Prekmurje region of Slovenia.

== Name ==
Satahovci was attested in written sources as Zetekolcz in 1365. The Slovene name Satahovci (like the Hungarian name Muraszentes and older Szvetahócz or Szvetehócz) is derived from the adjective *svętъ 'holy, sacred', referring to a consecrated place. In older sources, Satahovci is also attested in Slovene as Setovci, Svetovci, and Svetahovci. Today his name in Prekmurje Slovene Setovci.

== Cultural heritage ==
There is a small chapel in the settlement dedicated to the Holy Spirit. It was built in 1852 and has a belfry with an onion-domed copper-covered roof.
