= Krog, Murska Sobota =

Krog Kroug
- Location in Slovenia
- Coordinates: 46°38′11″N 16°8′11″E
- Country: Slovenia
- Traditional region: Prekmurje
- Statistical region: Mura
- Municipality: Murska Sobota

Area
  - Total: 8.4 km^{2} (3.2 sq mi)
- Elevation: 189.5 m (622 ft)

Population (2002)
  - Total: 1,096

Krog (pronounced [ˈkɾoːk]; Hungarian: Korong, Prekmurje Slovene: Kroug) is a village in the Municipality of Murska Sobota in the Prekmurje region of northeastern Slovenia.

There is a small chapel in the settlement. It was built in 1849 and is dedicated to Saint Florian.
