= 9th National Assembly of Slovenia =

9th National Assembly of the Republic of Slovenia
←	8th National Assembly	10th National Assembly	→
- Seat composition of the 9th National Assembly

Overview
- Legislative body: National Assembly of Slovenia
- Jurisdiction: Slovenia
- Meeting place: National Assembly Building, Ljubljana
- Term: 13 May 2022 –
- Election: 24 April 2022
- Government: Svoboda-SD-Levica
- Opposition: SDS-New Slovenia
- Website: dz-rs.si
- Members: 90
- Speaker: Urška Klakočar Zupančič (Svoboda)
- Party control: Svoboda-SD-Levica majority

The 9th National Assembly of the Republic of Slovenia was elected during the presidency of Borut Pahor. It was elected during the legislative election held on 24 April 2022.

The constituent session was held on 13 May 2022. Urška Klakočar Zupančič was elected President of the National Assembly.

== History ==
On 9 May 2022, the temporary heads of parliamentary groups of the parties of the new convocation met with the then President of the National Assembly, Igor Zorčič. The Freedom Movement was represented by Robert Golob, SDS by Danijel Krivec, New Slovenia by Jožef Horvat, Social Democrats by Matjaž Han and Left Party by Miha Kordiš. They determined the seating order, whereby SDS, NSi and Left retained their seats, while GS and SD were placed in the middle of the hall. The Freedom Movement nominated Urška Klakočar Zupančič for the post of President of the National Assembly, while the remaining vice-presidential positions would go to SD, Left and SDS. Robert Golob said he wants women in these positions. The new coalition proposed Robert Pavšič, who was a member of the List of Marjan Šarec in the previous convocation, for the position of Secretary General of the National Assembly. The Slovenian Democratic Party and Nova Slovenija characterized the proposal as unacceptable, since this position must be occupied by a person with the appearance of impartiality and a more suitable education.

=== Constituting session ===
The inaugural session of the new National Assembly took place on Friday, May 13, 2022. The President of the Republic, Borut Pahor, and the outgoing President of the National Assembly, Igor Zorčič, addressed the gathering, and the deputies confirmed their mandates. The meeting was chaired by the oldest MP - Miroslav Gregorič from the Freedom Movement party. At the founding session, the new leadership of the National Assembly was elected; Urška Klakočar Zupančič was elected president, and Meira Hot became vice president. In the SDS and NSi, immediately after the confirmation of the mandates of the deputies, they submitted about 30 draft laws to the parliamentary procedure, among others on RTV Slovenia and STA, as well as on the prosecution and the legal profession. On May 25, Nataša Sukič from the Left party was also elected to the position of vice-president of the National Assembly.

A week later, on May 20, 2022, deputies established new parliamentary groups. On May 24, the collegium of the President of the National Assembly distributed the positions in the working bodies (13 committees and eight commissions): Nine presidential positions went to the Freedom Movement, five to SDS, three to New Slovenia, two to SD and one to the Left, one presidential position, in the commission for national community, and it also belonged to one of the minority MPs.The Slovenian Democratic Party expressed its disapproval of the split due to the ratio of presidential seats between them and the Nova Slovenija party. According to the proportional calculation, SDS would have six presidential seats, and Nova Slovenia two. At the collegium meeting, NSi proposed a supplement, with which they obtained one additional position of president (in the commission for the control of public finances) and gave up one of the three vice-president positions. The Nova Slovenije amendment was accepted by the collegium, only the head of the SDS parliamentary group Jelka Godec opposed it, who pointed out the violation of the Rules of Procedure of the National Assembly of the Republic of Slovenia. Her party has therefore announced that they will not appoint their members to the presidential posts, nor will they nominate a candidate for the position of vice president of the National Assembly.

On Thursday, June 9, 2022, another extraordinary session of the DZ will take place, at which the mandates of substitute deputies will be confirmed, and the deputies will also vote on the third vice-president of the DZ in a secret ballot. The candidate for this position is Danijel Krivec from SDS.

== Current composition ==
This list consists of current members of the 9th National Assembly of Slovenia.

Constituency		Deputy	Party	Birth year	Notes
Const.	District	Deputy	Party	Birth year	Notes
Kranj	Jesenice	Katarina Štravs	Svoboda	1981	
Kranj	Radovljica 2	Alma Intihar	Svoboda	1973	
Kranj	Kranj 1	Andreja Kert	Svoboda	1964	
Kranj	Kranj 2	Sandra Gazinkovski	Svoboda	1988	
Kranj	Tržič	Borut Sajovic	Svoboda	1960	
Postojna	Izola	Robert Janev	Svoboda	1969	
Postojna	Koper 1	Tamara Kozlovič	Svoboda	1978	
Postojna	Koper 2	Mateja Čalušić	Svoboda	1987	
Postojna	Sežana	Andreja Živic	Svoboda	1970	
Postojna	Nova Gorica 1, Nova Gorica 2	Aleksander Prosen Kralj	Svoboda	1985	replaced Matej Arčon
Ljubljana Center	Ljubljana Vič - Rudnik 2	Lucija Tacer Perlin	Svoboda	1997	
Ljubljana Center	Ljubljana Vič - Rudnik 3	Mojca Šetinc Pašek	Svoboda	1972	
Ljubljana Center	Ljubljana Center, Ljubljana Šiška 1	Bojan Čebela	Svoboda	1955	replaced Robert Golob
Ljubljana Center	Ljubljana Šiška 2	Lenart Žavbi	Svoboda	1999	
Ljubljana Center	Ljubljana Šiška 3	Urška Klakočar Zupančič	Svoboda	1975	
Ljubljana Bežigrad	Ljubljana Moste - Polje 2	Miroslav Gregorič	Svoboda	1948	
Ljubljana Bežigrad	Ljubljana Moste - Polje 3	Martin Premk	Svoboda	1971	
Ljubljana Bežigrad	Ljubljana Bežigrad 1	Mirjam Bon Klanjšček	Svoboda	1954	
Ljubljana Bežigrad	Ljubljana Bežigrad 2	Tereza Novak	Svoboda	1966	
Ljubljana Bežigrad	Domžale 2	Monika Pekošak	Svoboda	1974	
Celje	Celje 1	Miha Lamut	Svoboda	1987	
Celje	Celje 2	Janja Sluga	Svoboda	1974	
Celje	Žalec 1	Aleš Rezar	Svoboda	1987	
Celje	Žalec 2	Dean Premik	Svoboda	1962	
Celje	Slovenj Gradec	Dušan Stojanovič	Svoboda	1969	
Novo Mesto	Novo mesto 2	Jožica Derganc	Svoboda	1965	
Novo Mesto	Brežice	Nataša Avšič Bogovič	Svoboda	1971	
Novo Mesto	Krško	Tamara Vonta	Svoboda	1970	
Novo Mesto	Litija	Franc Props	Svoboda	1963	
Novo Mesto	Hrastnik - Trbovlje	Gašper Ovnik	Svoboda	1982	
Novo Mesto	Zagorje	Teodor Uranič	Svoboda	1971	
Maribor	Maribor 2	Andreja Rajbenšu	Svoboda	1966	
Maribor	Maribor 4	Lena Grgurevič	Svoboda	1972	
Maribor	Maribor 5	Tomaž Lah	Svoboda	1964	replaced Barbara Kolenko Helbl
Maribor	Maribor 6	Rastislav Vrečko	Svoboda	1961	
Maribor	Maribor 7	Martin Marzidovšek	Svoboda	1982	
Ptuj	Ljutomer	Sara Žibrat	Svoboda	1992	
Ptuj	Murska Sobota 2	Tine Novak	Svoboda	1988	
Ptuj	Gornja Radgona	Vera Granfol	Svoboda	1963	
Ptuj	Pesnica	Darko Krajnc	Svoboda	1975	
Ptuj	Ptuj 2	Dejan Zavec	Svoboda	1976	
Kranj	Kranj 3	Branko Grims	SDS	1962	
Kranj	Škofja Loka 1	Andrej Hoivik	SDS	1993	
Kranj	Škofja Loka 2	Žan Mahnič	SDS	1990	
Postojna	Tolmin	Danijel Krivec	SDS	1965	
Postojna	Postojna	Zvone Černač	SDS	1962	
Postojna	Ajdovščina	Eva Irgl	SDS	1976	
Ljubljana Center	Logatec	Zoran Mojškerc	SDS	1978	
Ljubljana Center	Ljubljana Vič - Rudnik 1	Alenka Jeraj	SDS	1973	
Ljubljana Center	Ljubljana Vič - Rudnik 4	Anže Logar	SDS	1976	
Ljubljana Bežigrad	Grosuplje, Ivančna Gorica	Janez Janša	SDS	1958	
Ljubljana Bežigrad	Ribnica	Jože Tanko	SDS	1956	
Ljubljana Bežigrad	Domžale 1	Rado Gladek	SDS	1967	
Celje	Šentjur	Jelka Godec	SDS	1969	
Celje	Mozirje	Jožef Jelen	SDS	1964	
Celje	Velenje 2	Franc Rosec	SDS	1967	
Celje	Radlje	Alenka Helbl	SDS	1965	
Novo Mesto	Novo mesto 1	Anja Bah Žibert	SDS	1973	
Novo Mesto	Trebnje	Franci Kepa	SDS	1964	
Novo Mesto	Sevnica	Tomaž Lisec	SDS	1978	
Maribor	Šmarje pri Jelšah	Anton Šturbej	SDS	1960	
Maribor	Slovenska Bistrica	Karmen Furman	SDS	1980	
Maribor	Slovenske Konjice	Bojan Podkrajšek	SDS	1968	
Maribor	Maribor 3	Dejan Kaloh	SDS	1975	
Ptuj	Lendava	Janez Magyar	SDS	1968	
Ptuj	Lenart	Franc Breznik	SDS	1970	
Ptuj	Ptuj 1	Jožef Lenart	SDS	1969	
Ptuj	Ptuj 3	Suzana Lep Šimenko	SDS	1979	
Kranj	Kranj 3, Kamnik	Matej Tonin	NSi	1983	
Kranj	Škofja Loka 2	Janez Žakelj	NSi	1964	
Postojna	Ajdovščina	Jernej Vrtovec	NSi	1985	
Ljubljana Center	Logatec	Iva Dimic	NSi	1972	
Ljubljana Bežigrad	Ribnica - Dobrepolje, Domžale 1	Janez Cigler Kralj	NSi	1978	
Celje	Žalec 2	Aleksander Reberšek	NSi	1980	
Novo Mesto	Novo mesto 1	Vida Čadonič Špelič	NSi	1959	
Ptuj	Lendava	Jožef Horvat	NSi	1955	
Postojna	Piran	Meira Hot	SD	1980	
Ljubljana Center	Ljubljana Šiška 2	Jonas Žnidaršič	SD	1962	replaced Tanja Fajon
Ljubljana Bežigrad	Kočevje	Predrag Baković	SD	1964	
Celje	Ravne na Koroškem	Jani Prednik	SD	1987	
Novo Mesto	Laško	Soniboj Knežak	SD	1962	replaced Matjaž Han
Maribor	Ruše	Bojana Muršič	SD	1971	
Ptuj	Murska Sobota 1	Damijan Zrim	SD	1993	
Kranj	Škofja Loka 1	Miha Kordiš	Levica	1989	
Maribor	Maribor 4	Tatjana Greif	Levica	1966	
Ljubljana Center	Ljubljana Center	Milan Jakopovič	Levica	1972	replaced Luka Mesec
Ljubljana Bežigrad	Ljubljana Bežigrad 2	Nataša Sukič	Levica	1962	
Postojna	Koper 1	Matej Tašner Vatovec	Levica	1983	
Minorities districts	Koper	Felice Žiža	Minorities	1963	
Minorities districts	Lendava	Ferenc Horváth	Minorities	1972	

== See also ==
- Politics of Slovenia
- 8th National Assembly of Slovenia
