= List of members of the 10th National Assembly of Slovenia =

This is a list of members of the 10th National Assembly of Slovenia elected at the parliamentary election held on 22 March 2026, and subsequent changes during the 2026–2030 legislative term.

At the election, the governing centre-left parties lost their majority in the 90 seat Assembly, winning 40 seats - Freedom Movement (Svoboda) 29 seats, Social Democrats (SD) six seats and Levica and Vesna five seats. Right-wing parties won 48 seats - Slovenian Democratic Party (SDS) 28 seats, NSi, SLS, FOKUS nine seats, Democrats (D) six seats and Resni.ca five seats. The remaining two seats were filled by representatives of national minorities.

The 10th National Assembly convened for the first time on 10 April 2026 and Zoran Stevanović, leader of the anti-establishment Resni.ca, was elected president of the National Assembly with the support of other right-wing parties. Danijel Krivec (SDS) and Franc Križan (D) were elected vice-presidents on 21 April 2026. The third vice-president position is traditionally reserved for the largest opposition group in the Assembly and on 11 May 2026 Svoboda's Nataša Avšič Bogovič was elected to the position.

Following two months of negotiations, Janez Janša (SDS), Jernej Vrtovec (NSi), Anže Logar (D), Tina Bregant (SLS) and Marko Lotrič (FOKUS) signed a coalition agreement on 21 May 2026 and, with Resni.ca providing external support to the coalition, Janša was elected Prime Minister by the Assembly the following day. Janša's nominations for the new government were approved by the Assembly on 4 June 2026.

Membership of the National Assembly is considered a professional position and the holding most outside positions, including being a member of the government, is deemed incompatible with being a member. Members are also barred from carrying any activity for the purpose of obtaining income or material gain, with a few exceptions. Up to June 2026 there have been seven changes in membership of the 10th National Assembly due to these incompatibilities.

== Members ==
Name	Constituency	Electoral district	Votes	%	Party	Alliance	Took office	Left office	Notes
Matej Arčon	Postojna	Nova Gorica 2	7,205	43.54%	Freedom Movement		10 April 2026		
Nataša Avšič Bogovič	Novo Mesto	Hrastnik-Trbovlje (Note: Also elected in Brežice.)	5,555	41.11%	Freedom Movement		10 April 2026		Vice-president
Maruša Babnik	Ljubljana Bežigrad	Ljubljana Moste Polje 1	4,227	25.35%	Slovenian Democratic Party		26 May 2026		Replaces Janez Janša.
Anja Bah Žibert	Novo Mesto	Novo Mesto 1	7,056	38.71%	Slovenian Democratic Party		10 April 2026		
Janez Beja	Ljubljana Bežigrad	Domžale 1	2,293	12.13%	New Slovenia	NSi-SLS-FOKUS	9 June 2026		Replaces Janez Cigler Kralj.
Klemen Boštjančič	Novo Mesto	Novo Mesto 2 (Note: Also elected in Krško.)	5,551	30.16%	Freedom Movement		10 April 2026		
Alenka Bratušek	Kranj	Jesenice (Note: Also elected in Kranj 2.)	5,969	36.69%	Freedom Movement		10 April 2026		
Tina Brecelj	Kranj	Škofja Loka 1	1,040	7.38%	The Left	Levica-Vesna	10 April 2026		
Franc Breznik	Ptuj	Lenart	4,283	37.66%	Slovenian Democratic Party		10 April 2026		President of the Committee on Foreign Policy.
Ana Cajhen	Ljubljana Bežigrad	Domžale 2	1,256	7.25%	Democrats		15 June 2026		Replaces Barbara Levstik Šega.
Mateja Čalušić	Postojna	Koper 2	6,737	39.62%	Freedom Movement		10 April 2026		
Zvonko Černač	Postojna	Ajdovščina	4,448	28.37%	Slovenian Democratic Party		10 April 2026		
Andrej Černigoj	Postojna	Ilirska Bistrica	1,181	15.76%	New Slovenia	NSi-SLS-FOKUS	9 June 2026		Replaces Jernej Vrtovec.
Janez Cigler Kralj	Ljubljana Bežigrad	Ribnica-Dobrepolje	1,492	14.18%	New Slovenia	NSi-SLS-FOKUS	10 April 2026	4 June 2026	Forfeited membership (government minister). Replaced by Janez Beja.
Iva Dimic	Ljubljana Center	Logatec	2,321	12.44%	New Slovenia	NSi-SLS-FOKUS	10 April 2026		President of the Committee on Health.
Karmen Furman	Maribor	Slovenska Bistrica	7,103	39.63%	Slovenian Democratic Party		10 April 2026		
Sandra Gazinkovski	Kranj	Kranj 1	4,169	29.55%	Freedom Movement		10 April 2026		
Rado Gladek	Ljubljana Bežigrad	Domžale 1	5,085	26.90%	Slovenian Democratic Party		10 April 2026		President of the Committee on Finance.
Jelka Godec	Celje	Šentjur	5,269	42.06%	Slovenian Democratic Party		10 April 2026		Leader of the SDS group.
Robert Golob	Ljubljana Bežigrad	Ljubljana Bežigrad 1 (Note: Also elected in Domžale 2.)	5,825	33.50%	Freedom Movement		10 April 2026		
Luka Goršek	Ljubljana Center	Ljubljana Šiška 2	1,078	8.29%	Social Democrats		10 April 2026		
Matej Grah	Ptuj	Murska Sobota 2	5,470	33.75%	Freedom Movement		10 April 2026		
Lena Grgurevič	Maribor	Maribor 4	2,845	34.47%	Freedom Movement		10 April 2026		
Jana Gržinič	Postojna	Postojna	3,109	25.42%	Slovenian Democratic Party		10 April 2026		
Aleksander Gungl	Ptuj	Lenart	1,362	11.98%	New Slovenia	NSi-SLS-FOKUS	10 April 2026		President of the Committee on Demography, Family, Social Affairs and Disability.
Matjaž Han	Novo Mesto	Laško	2,058	20.38%	Social Democrats		10 April 2026		President of the Committee on Local Self-Government and Regional Development.
Aleš Hojs	Ljubljana Center	Ljubljana Vič Rudnik 4	5,005	29.93%	Slovenian Democratic Party		10 April 2026		President of the Committee on Infrastructure and Energy.
Ferenc Horváth	Lendava		2,336	72.46%			10 April 2026		Hungarian national community member.
Meira Hot	Postojna	Piran	1,259	14.03%	Social Democrats		10 April 2026		Leader of the SD group.
Robert Janev	Postojna	Izola	3,203	40.03%	Freedom Movement		10 April 2026		
Janez Janša	Ljubljana Bežigrad	Ivančna Gorica (Note: Also elected in Grosuplje.)	4,593	44.24%	Slovenian Democratic Party		10 April 2026	22 May 2026	Forfeited membership (Prime Minister) Replaced by Maruša Babnik.
Jožef Jelen	Celje	Mozirje	3,709	36.14%	Slovenian Democratic Party		10 April 2026		
Alenka Jeraj	Ljubljana Center	Ljubljana Vič Rudnik 1	5,705	28.47%	Slovenian Democratic Party		10 April 2026		President of the Committee on Culture.
Jana Jerman	Novo Mesto	Črnomelj	4,284	29.74%	Freedom Movement		10 April 2026		
Andreja Katič	Celje	Velenje 1	1,377	12.82%	Social Democrats		10 April 2026		President of the Committee on EU Affairs.
Franci Kepa	Novo Mesto	Trebnje	4,640	36.36%	Slovenian Democratic Party		10 April 2026		
Andrej Klemenc	Ljubljana Center	Ljubljana Šiška 1	3,141	32.60%	Freedom Movement		10 April 2026		
Adrijana Kocjančič	Postojna	Ilirska Bistrica	1,987	26.52%	Slovenian Democratic Party		10 April 2026		
Katja Kokot	Maribor	Maribor 3	897	7.69%	Resni.ca		10 April 2026		Leader of the Resni.ca group. President of the Committee on Agriculture, Forestry and Food Sovereignty.
Andrej Kosec	Kranj	Kranj 3	6,388	32.77%	Slovenian Democratic Party		10 April 2026		
Andrej Kosi	Ptuj	Ormož	3,689	38.80%	Slovenian Democratic Party		10 April 2026		President of the Committee on the Environment and Spatial Planning.
Tea Košir	Kranj	Radovljica 2	1,020	8.83%	Democrats		10 April 2026	10 June 2026	Forfeited membership (state secretary). Replaced by Elena Zavadlav Ušaj.
Tamara Kozlovič	Postojna	Koper 1	4,713	41.35%	Freedom Movement		10 April 2026		
Danijel Krivec	Postojna	Tolmin	3,191	29.52%	Slovenian Democratic Party		10 April 2026		Vice-president
Franc Križan	Maribor	Šmarje pri Jelšah	1,527	8.29%	Democrats		10 April 2026		Vice-president
Tomaž Lah	Maribor	Maribor 6	3,823	36.14%	Freedom Movement		10 April 2026		
Jožef Lenart	Ptuj	Ptuj 1	5,612	36.89%	Slovenian Democratic Party		10 April 2026		
Suzana Lep Šimenko	Ptuj	Ptuj 3	5,037	38.37%	Slovenian Democratic Party		10 April 2026	4 June 2026	Forfeited membership (government minister. Replaced by Luka Simonič.
Manja Lesnik	Celje	Velenje 2	4,358	35.57%	Slovenian Democratic Party		10 April 2026		
Vinko Levstek	Ljubljana Bežigrad	Ribnica-Dobrepolje	4,325	41.09%	Slovenian Democratic Party		10 April 2026		
Barbara Levstik Šega	Ljubljana Bežigrad	Ribnica-Dobrepolje	915	8.69%	Democrats		10 April 2026	10 June 2026	Forfeited membership (state secretary). Replaced by Ana Cajhen.
Tomaž Lisec	Novo Mesto	Sevnica	4,250	35.79%	Slovenian Democratic Party		10 April 2026		
Vinko Logaj	Novo Mesto	Litija	3,700	29.29%	Freedom Movement		10 April 2026		
Žan Mahnič	Kranj	Škofja Loka 2	5,103	40.78%	Slovenian Democratic Party		10 April 2026		President of the Committee on Internal Affairs and Public Administration.
Luka Mesec	Ljubljana Center	Ljubljana Center (Note: Also elected in Ljubljana Šiška 1.)	2,681	19.69%	The Left	Levica-Vesna	10 April 2026		
Boris Mijič	Ptuj	Gornja Radgona	1,044	8.97%	Resni.ca		10 April 2026		
Martin Mikolič	Maribor	Šmarje pri Jelšah	2,076	11.28%	New Slovenia	NSi-SLS-FOKUS	10 April 2026		
Zoran Mojškerc	Ljubljana Center	Logatec	5,407	28.99%	Slovenian Democratic Party		10 April 2026		
Damjan Muzel	Celje	Celje 1	7,052	33.46%	Slovenian Democratic Party		10 April 2026		
Tereza Novak	Ljubljana Bežigrad	Ljubljana Bežigrad 2	4,843	33.72%	Freedom Movement		10 April 2026		
Srečko Ocvirk	Novo Mesto	Sevnica	1,874	15.78%	Slovenian People's Party	NSi-SLS-FOKUS	10 April 2026		President of the Committee on Defence.
Janez Jože Olovec	Novo Mesto	Krško	4,925	31.50%	Slovenian Democratic Party		10 April 2026		
Tadej Ostrc	Ljubljana Center	Ljubljana Vič Rudnik 4	1,418	8.48%	Democrats		10 April 2026	4 June 2026	Forfeited membership (government minister). Replaced by Dejan Zakrajšek.
Metka Pešl Šater	Celje	Ravne na Koroškem	4,636	32.42%	Freedom Movement		10 April 2026		
Bojan Podkrajšek	Maribor	Slovenske Konjice	5,725	40.42%	Slovenian Democratic Party		10 April 2026		
Andrej Poglajen	Kranj	Idrija	2,825	29.27%	Slovenian Democratic Party		10 April 2026		President of the Committee on Justice.
Robert Potnik	Celje	Radlje	1,567	11.12%	Democrats		10 April 2026		President of the Committee on the Economy, Labour and Sport.
Martin Premk	Ljubljana Bežigrad	Ljubljana Moste Polje 3	4,632	34.93%	Freedom Movement		10 April 2026		
Andreja Rajbenšu	Maribor	Maribor 7	2,888	36.56%	Freedom Movement		10 April 2026		
Darko Ratajc	Maribor	Slovenske Konjice	1,218	8.60%	Social Democrats		10 April 2026		
Aleksander Reberšek	Celje	Žalec 2	3,142	22.11%	New Slovenia	NSi-SLS-FOKUS	10 April 2026		
Borut Sajovic	Kranj	Tržič	2,525	29.53%	Freedom Movement		10 April 2026		Leader of the Svoboda group.
Vladimir Šega	Maribor	Maribor 4	872	10.56%	The Left	Levica-Vesna	10 April 2026		
Luka Simonič	Ptuj	Pesnica	4,262	35.95%	Slovenian Democratic Party		9 June 2026		Replaces Suzana Lep Šimenko.
Janja Sluga	Celje	Celje 2	4,357	31.07%	Freedom Movement		10 April 2026		
Marjeta Šmid	Kranj	Škofja Loka 1	2,108	14.96%	Focus	NSi-SLS-FOKUS	10 April 2026		President of the Committee on Education, Youth and Science.
Zoran Stevanović	Kranj	Kranj 2	1,698	11.55%	Resni.ca		10 April 2026		President
Dušan Stojanovič	Celje	Slovenj Gradec	4,569	33.88%	Freedom Movement		10 April 2026		
Aleksander Štorek	Celje	Celje 2	832	5.93%	Resni.ca		10 April 2026		
Anton Šturbej	Maribor	Šmarje pri Jelšah	6,549	35.58%	Slovenian Democratic Party		10 April 2026		
Dejan Süč	Ptuj	Lendava	3,894	32.55%	Freedom Movement		10 April 2026		
Nataša Sukič	Postojna	Koper 1	1,008	8.84%	The Left	Levica-Vesna	10 April 2026		
Lucija Tacer Perlin	Ljubljana Center	Ljubljana Šiška 3	3,895	32.16%	Freedom Movement		10 April 2026		
Nedeljko Todorović	Ljubljana Bežigrad	Ljubljana Moste Polje 2	725	7.64%	Resni.ca		10 April 2026		
Teodor Uranič	Novo Mesto	Zagorje	3,540	36.25%	Freedom Movement		10 April 2026		
Tamara Vonta	Ljubljana Center	Ljubljana Vič Rudnik 3	3,964	32.71%	Freedom Movement		10 April 2026		
Asta Vrečko	Ljubljana Bežigrad	Ljubljana Bežigrad 2	2,136	14.87%	The Left	Levica-Vesna	10 April 2026		Leader of the Levica-Vesna group.
Jernej Vrtovec	Postojna	Ajdovščina	2,717	17.33%	New Slovenia	NSi-SLS-FOKUS	10 April 2026	4 June 2026	Forfeited membership (government minister). Replaced by Andrej Černigoj.
Duško Vujanović	Ljubljana Center	Ljubljana Šiška 2	4,216	32.43%	Freedom Movement		10 April 2026		
Janez Žakelj	Kranj	Škofja Loka 2	2,184	17.45%	New Slovenia	NSi-SLS-FOKUS	10 April 2026		Leader of the NSi-SLS-FOKUS group.
Dejan Zakrajšek	Ljubljana Center	Ljubljana Vič Rudnik 1	1,525	7.61%	Democrats		9 June 2026		Replaces Tadej Ostrc.
Elena Zavadlav Ušaj	Kranj	Kranj 3	1,597	8.19%	Democrats		15 June 2026		Replaces Tea Košir. Leader of the D group.
Lenart Žavbi	Ljubljana Bežigrad	Ljubljana Moste Polje 2	3,668	38.63%	Freedom Movement		10 April 2026		
Sara Žibrat	Ptuj	Ljutomer	3,031	31.17%	Freedom Movement		10 April 2026		
Felice Ziza	Koper		802	41.45%			10 April 2026		Italian national community member. Leader of the National Communities group.
Mojca Žnidarič	Ptuj	Ormož	906	9.53%	Democrats		10 April 2026		
Damijan Zrim	Ptuj	Murska Sobota 1	2,071	13.65%	Social Democrats		10 April 2026		
