= Postojna (National Assembly constituency) =

Constituency in Slovenia

- Constituency for the National Assembly
- Location of Postojna within Slovenia
- Municipality: List: Ajdovščina; Ankaran; Bovec; Brda; Divača; Hrpelje-Kozina; Ilirska Bistrica; Izola; Kanal; Kobarid; Komen; Koper; Miren-Kostanjevica; Nova Gorica; Piran; Pivka; Postojna; Renče-Vogrsko; Šempeter-Vrtojba; Sežana; Tolmin; Vipava
- Population: 258,545 (2025)
- Electorate: 209,334 (2026)
- Area: 3,918 km^{2} (2024)

Current Constituency
- Created: 1992
- Seats: 11 (1992–present)
- Deputies: List: Matej Arčon (Svoboda); Mateja Čalušić (Svoboda); Zvone Černač (SDS); Andrej Černigoj (NSi); Jana Gržinič (SDS); Meira Hot (SD); Robi Janev (Svoboda); Adrijana Kocjančič (SDS); Tamara Kozlovič (Svoboda); Danijel Krivec (SDS); Nataša Sukič (Levica)
- Electoral districts: List: Ajdovščina; Ilirska Bistrica; Izola; Koper 1; Koper 2; Nova Gorica 1; Nova Gorica 2; Piran; Postojna; Sežana; Tolmin

Postojna, officially known as the 2nd constituency (Slovene: 2. volilna enota), is one of the eight multi-member constituencies (electoral units) of the National Assembly, the national legislature of Slovenia. The constituency was established in 1992 following Slovenia's independence from Yugoslavia. It consists of the municipalities of Ajdovščina, Ankaran, Bovec, Brda, Divača, Hrpelje-Kozina, Ilirska Bistrica, Izola, Kanal, Kobarid, Komen, Koper, Miren-Kostanjevica, Nova Gorica, Piran, Pivka, Postojna, Renče-Vogrsko, Šempeter-Vrtojba, Sežana, Tolmin and Vipava. The constituency currently elects 11 of the 90 members of the National Assembly using the open party-list proportional representation electoral system. At the 2026 parliamentary election the constituency had 209,334 registered electors.

== History ==
The 2nd constituency (Postojna) was one of the eight constituencies established by the Determination of Constituencies for the Election of Deputies to the National Assembly Act (ZDVEDZ) (Zakon o določitvi volilnih enot za volitve poslancev v državni zbor (ZDVEDZ)) passed by the Assembly of the Republic of Slovenia (Skupščina Republike Slovenije) in September 1992. It consisted of the municipalities of Ajdovščina, Ilirska Bistrica, Izola, Koper, Nova Gorica, Piran, Postojna, Sežana and Tolmin.

Following the re-organisation of municipalities in October 1994, parts of Ajdovščina municipality were transferred to the newly created Vipava municipality; parts of Nova Gorica municipality were transferred to the newly created municipalities of Brda, Kanal and Miren-Kostanjevica; parts of Postojna municipality were transferred to the newly created Pivka municipality; parts of Sežana municipality were transferred to the newly created municipalities of Divača, Hrpelje-Kozina and Komen; and parts of Tolmin municipality were transferred to the newly created municipalities of Bovec and Kobarid.

In August 1998 parts of Nova Gorica municipality were transferred to the newly created Šempeter-Vrtojba municipality. In June 2006 parts of Nova Gorica municipality were transferred to the newly created Renče-Vogrskoi municipality. Ankaran municipality was created from parts of Koper municipality in June 2011.

In February 2021 the National Assembly passed Amendments and Supplements to the Determination of Constituencies for the Election of Deputies to the National Assembly Act (ZDVEDZ-B) (Zakon o spremembah in dopolnitvah Zakona o določitvi volilnih enot za volitve poslancev v državni zbor (ZDVEDZ-B)) which defined the Postojna constituency as consisting of the municipalities of Ajdovščina, Ankaran, Bovec, Brda, Divača, Hrpelje-Kozina, Ilirska Bistrica, Izola, Kanal, Kobarid, Komen, Koper, Miren-Kostanjevica, Nova Gorica, Piran, Pivka, Postojna, Renče-Vogrsko, Šempeter-Vrtojba, Sežana, Tolmin and Vipava.

== Electoral system ==
Postojna currently elects 11 of the 90 members of the National Assembly using the open party-list proportional representation electoral system. Each constituency is divided into 11 electoral districts (volilni okraji) in which each party stands a single candidate. Electors vote for a candidate of their choice in their electoral district and then the votes received by each party's candidates are aggregated at the constituency level.

Allocation of seats was carried out in two stages. In the first stage, seats are allocated to parties at the constituency level using the Droop quota (Hare quota prior to 2006). In the second stage, unallocated seats from the first stage are aggregated at the national level and allocated to parties using the D'Hondt method (any seats won by the party at the constituency level are subtracted from the party's national seats). Though calculated nationally, national seats are allocated at the constituency level.

Since 2000, only parties that reach the 4% national threshold compete for seats at both constituency and national levels. Prior to this there was no threshold at the constituency level but parties needed to reach 3/88 (c3.4%) to compete for seats at the national level.

Seats won by each party in a constituency are allocated to the candidates with the highest percentage of votes. As a consequence, multiple candidates may be elected from an electoral district whilst others may have no candidates elected. Prior to 2000 parties had the option to have up to 50% of their national seats allocated in the order they appear on their party list (closed list).

== Electoral districts ==
Postojna is divided into 11 electoral districts:

- 1. Tolmin - municipalities of Bovec, Kobarid and Tolmin.
- 2. Piran - municipality of Piran.
- 3. Izola - municipality of Izola.
- 4. Koper 1 - municipality of Koper (Šalara and parts of Koper only).
- 5. Koper 2 - municipalities of Ankaran and Koper (except Šalara and parts of Koper).
- 6. Sežana - municipalities of Divača, Hrpelje-Kozina, Komen and Sežana.
- 7. Ilirska Bistrica - municipality of Ilirska Bistrica.
- 8. Postojna - municipalities of Pivka and Postojna.
- 9. Nova Gorica 1 - municipalities of Brda, Kanal, Miren-Kostanjevica, Nova Gorica (except Ajševica, Kromberk, Loke, Nova Gorica, Pristava, Rožna Dolina, Šmaver, Solkan, Stara Gora and Sveta Gora) and Renče-Vogrsko (Oševljek and Renče only).
- 10. Nova Gorica 2 - municipalities of Nova Gorica (Ajševica, Kromberk, Loke, Nova Gorica, Pristava, Rožna Dolina, Šmaver, Solkan, Stara Gora and Sveta Gora only), Renče-Vogrsko (except Oševljek and Renče) and Šempeter-Vrtojba.
- 11. Ajdovščina - municipalities Ajdovščina and Vipava.

== Election results ==
=== Summary ===
Election	Left Levica / ZL / TRS			Social Democrats SD / ZLSD / ZL			Freedom Movement Svoboda			Positive Slovenia PS / LZJ-PS			Liberal Democracy LDS			Let's Connect PoS / SMC			Slovenian People's SLS / SLS-SMS / SLS-SKD			Christian Democrats SKD			New Slovenia NSi			Slovenian Democrats SDS / SDSS			Slovenian Nationalists SNS		
Election	Votes	%	Seats	Votes	%	Seats	Votes	%	Seats	Votes	%	Seats	Votes	%	Seats	Votes	%	Seats	Votes	%	Seats	Votes	%	Seats	Votes	%	Seats	Votes	%	Seats	Votes	%	Seats
2026	8,663	6.16%	0	10,399	7.39%	0	48,930	34.79%	4										with PoS						12,763	9.08%	1	31,555	22.44%	2	2,899	2.06%	0
2022	6,873	4.77%	0	10,684	7.42%	0	56,448	39.19%	4							3,804	2.64%	0	with PoS						9,425	6.54%	0	27,880	19.36%	2	1,255	0.87%	0
2018	12,036	11.64%	1	13,484	13.04%	1										8,915	8.62%	1	1,713	1.66%	0				7,879	7.62%	0	22,523	21.79%	2	3,082	2.98%	0
2014	6,919	6.58%	0	8,360	7.95%	0				2,893	2.75%	0				35,983	34.21%	4	2,755	2.62%	0				5,659	5.38%	0	20,059	19.07%	2	1,546	1.47%	0
2011	2,016	1.54%	0	23,238	17.79%	2				35,222	26.97%	3	1,455	1.11%	0				4,964	3.80%	0				6,312	4.83%	0	29,773	22.79%	2	1,790	1.37%	0
2008				48,222	38.41%	4							4,971	3.96%	0				3,719	2.96%	0	647	0.52%	0	3,457	2.75%	0	34,584	27.55%	3	6,077	4.84%	0
2004				16,122	13.97%	1							23,458	20.33%	2				5,794	5.02%	0				9,792	8.49%	1	28,454	24.66%	2	6,146	5.33%	0
2000				26,469	20.24%	2							39,506	30.21%	3				11,227	8.58%	1	with SLS			10,667	8.16%	0	16,305	12.47%	1	5,979	4.57%	0
1996				17,179	13.07%	1							32,939	25.06%	2				21,521	16.37%	1	11,711	8.91%	0				17,980	13.68%	1	4,170	3.17%	0
1992				25,084	16.83%	1							30,659	20.57%	2				11,107	7.45%	0	20,545	13.78%	1				4,185	2.81%	0	12,824	8.60%	0

(Excludes national seats. Figures in italics represent alliances/joint lists.)

=== Detailed ===
Party has received at least 4% of the vote nationally (since 2000).

==== 2020s ====
===== 2026 =====
Results of the 2026 parliamentary election held on 22 March 2026:

Party		Votes per electoral district											Total votes	%	Seats		
Party		Ajdovš- čina	Ilirska Bistrica	Izola	Koper 1	Koper 2	Nova Gorica 1	Nova Gorica 2	Piran	Postojna	Sežana	Tolmin	Total votes	%	Con.	Nat.	Tot.
Freedom Movement	Svoboda	3,598	2,168	3,203	4,713	6,737	6,579	7,205	2,926	3,670	5,332	2,799	48,930	34.79%	4	0	4
Slovenian Democratic Party	SDS	4,448	1,987	1,466	1,757	3,257	4,502	3,256	1,764	3,109	2,818	3,191	31,555	22.44%	2	2	4
New Slovenia – Christian Democrats, Slovenian People's Party and Focus	NSi-SLS- FOKUS	2,717	1,181	376	507	929	1,677	1,076	478	1,159	1,015	1,648	12,763	9.08%	1	0	1
Social Democrats	SD	1,565	366	594	790	1,151	1,103	952	1,259	768	1,155	696	10,399	7.39%	0	1	1
The Left and Vesna – Green Party	Levica-Vesna	654	451	570	1,008	1,004	796	1,129	668	764	1,042	577	8,663	6.16%	0	1	1
Democrats	D	1,009	369	438	530	819	1,101	872	539	833	872	572	7,954	5.66%	0	0	0
Resni.ca	Resni.ca	402	243	511	959	1,323	595	624	536	619	678	374	6,864	4.88%	0	0	0
Prerod	Prerod	337	205	238	303	468	384	371	253	405	618	300	3,882	2.76%	0	0	0
Pirate Party	Pirati	442	159	204	356	492	389	361	230	305	391	240	3,569	2.54%	0	0	0
Slovenian National Party	SNS	242	208	164	199	438	396	286	122	301	339	204	2,899	2.06%	0	0	0
We, Socialists!	MI!	67	47	69	79	109	93	132	61	112	116	51	936	0.67%	0	0	0
Alternative for Slovenia	AzaS	88	26	60	71	94	84	103	40	46	71	64	747	0.53%	0	0	0
Greens of Slovenia and Party of Generations	ZS-SG	57	32	41	39	60	76	86	32	53	94	31	601	0.43%	0	0	0
Voice of Pensioners	GU	32	40	43	62	82	60	46	42	44	62	40	553	0.39%	0	0	0
Karl Erjavec - Trust Party	SZ	20	11	25	26	39	38	48	23	43	26	22	321	0.23%	0	0	0
Valid votes		15,678	7,493	8,002	11,399	17,002	17,873	16,547	8,973	12,231	14,629	10,809	140,636	100.00%	7	4	11
Rejected votes		179	109	104	117	163	174	154	94	172	190	111	1,567	1.10%			
Total polled		15,857	7,602	8,106	11,516	17,165	18,047	16,701	9,067	12,403	14,819	10,920	142,203	67.93%			
Registered electors		20,798	12,619	12,491	18,272	25,575	24,934	23,825	14,567	18,171	22,353	15,729	209,334				
Turnout		76.24%	60.24%	64.89%	63.03%	67.12%	72.38%	70.10%	62.24%	68.26%	66.30%	69.43%	67.93%				

The following candidates were elected:

- Constituency seats - Matej Arčon (Svoboda, Nova Gorica 2), 7,205 votes; Mateja Čalušić (Svoboda, Koper 2), 6,737 votes; Zvone Černač (SDS, Ajdovščina), 4,448 votes; Robi Janev (Svoboda, Izola) 3,203 votes; Tamara Kozlovič (Svoboda, Koper 1), 4,713 votes; Danijel Krivec (SDS, Tolmin), 3,191 votes; and Jernej Vrtovec (NSi-SLS-FOKUS, Ajdovščina), 2,717 votes.
- National seats - Jana Gržinič (SDS, Postojna), 3,109 votes; Meira Hot (SD, Piran), 1,259 votes; Adrijana Kocjančič (SDS, Ilirska Bistrica), 1,987 votes; and Nataša Sukič (Levica, Koper 1), 1,008 votes.

Substitutions:

- Jernej Vrtovec (NSi-SLS-FOKUS, Ajdovščina) forfeited his seat on 4 June 2026 upon being elected to the government and was replaced by Andrej Černigoj (NSi-SLS-FOKUS, Ilirska Bistrica) on 9 June 2026.

===== 2022 =====
Results of the 2022 parliamentary election held on 24 April 2022:

Party		Votes per electoral district											Total votes	%	Seats		
Party		Ajdovš- čina	Ilirska Bistrica	Izola	Koper 1	Koper 2	Nova Gorica 1	Nova Gorica 2	Piran	Postojna	Sežana	Tolmin	Total votes	%	Con.	Nat.	Tot.
Freedom Movement	Svoboda	4,359	2,443	3,682	5,213	7,466	7,484	7,936	3,691	4,266	6,178	3,730	56,448	39.19%	4	1	5
Slovenian Democratic Party	SDS	4,163	1,799	1,234	1,329	2,502	4,214	3,095	1,510	2,925	2,271	2,838	27,880	19.36%	2	1	3
Social Democrats	SD	1,390	354	710	864	1,169	1,117	1,321	1,097	738	1,029	895	10,684	7.42%	0	1	1
New Slovenia – Christian Democrats	NSi	2,275	1,095	273	324	646	1,250	760	315	661	669	1,157	9,425	6.54%	0	1	1
The Left	Levica	555	319	484	861	834	586	835	527	618	891	363	6,873	4.77%	0	1	1
List of Marjan Šarec	LMŠ	311	315	242	386	611	352	292	313	747	430	246	4,245	2.95%	0	0	0
Party of Alenka Bratušek	SAB	217	186	321	422	647	315	416	285	392	853	167	4,221	2.93%	0	0	0
Let's Connect Slovenia	PoS	363	284	193	184	279	473	373	140	378	419	718	3,804	2.64%	0	0	0
Resni.ca		227	149	234	316	512	287	264	263	235	338	174	2,999	2.08%	0	0	0
Our Future and Good Country	SNP-DD	204	110	200	341	432	253	647	178	179	287	95	2,926	2.03%	0	0	0
For a Healthy Society	ZSi	244	59	195	229	341	290	287	263	206	308	195	2,617	1.82%	0	0	0
Pirate Party		281	102	154	260	285	268	237	152	208	275	152	2,374	1.65%	0	0	0
Our Country		222	144	75	70	179	374	202	81	253	375	167	2,142	1.49%	0	0	0
List of Boris Popovič – Let's Digitize Slovenia	LBP	53	30	136	644	782	54	54	121	97	100	18	2,089	1.45%	0	0	0
Vesna – Green Party		173	91	86	100	167	369	187	87	131	177	165	1,733	1.20%	0	0	0
Slovenian National Party	SNS	123	121	52	80	105	161	131	62	133	169	118	1,255	0.87%	0	0	0
Democratic Party of Pensioners of Slovenia	DeSUS	106	66	83	86	94	131	95	68	119	119	68	1,035	0.72%	0	0	0
For the People of Slovenia	ZLS	69	55	64	92	125	131	76	60	56	94	54	876	0.61%	0	0	0
Homeland League	DOM	24	9	22	10	28	33	38	19	25	22	15	245	0.17%	0	0	0
Liberate Slovenia Alliance	ZOS	8	9	11	13	29	22	12	14	12	21	13	164	0.11%	0	0	0
Valid votes		15,367	7,740	8,451	11,824	17,233	18,164	17,258	9,246	12,379	15,025	11,348	144,035	100.00%	6	5	11
Rejected votes		181	128	105	152	145	165	147	104	130	193	101	1,551	1.07%			
Total polled		15,548	7,868	8,556	11,976	17,378	18,329	17,405	9,350	12,509	15,218	11,449	145,586	69.55%			
Registered electors		20,656	12,706	12,644	18,485	24,985	25,098	23,879	14,707	18,119	21,966	16,066	209,311				
Turnout		75.27%	61.92%	67.67%	64.79%	69.55%	73.03%	72.89%	63.58%	69.04%	69.28%	71.26%	69.55%				

The following candidates were elected:

- Constituency seats - Matej Arčon (Svoboda, Nova Gorica 1 & Nova Gorica 2), 15,420 votes; Mateja Čalušić (Svoboda, Koper 2), 7,466 votes; Eva Irgl (SDS, Ajdovščina), 4,163 votes; Robi Janev (Svoboda, Izola) 3,682 votes; Danijel Krivec (SDS, Tolmin), 2,838 votes; and Tamara Kozlovič (Svoboda, Koper 1), 5,213 votes.
- National seats - Zvone Černač (SDS, Postojna), 2,925 votes; Meira Hot (SD, Piran), 1,097 votes; Matej Tašner Vatovec (Levica, Koper 1), 861 votes; Jernej Vrtovec (NSi, Ajdovščina), 2,275 votes; and Andreja Živic (Svoboda, Sežana), 6,178 votes.

Substitutions:

- Matej Arčon (Svoboda, Nova Gorica 1 & Nova Gorica 2) forfeited his seat on 1 June 2022 upon being elected to the government and was replaced by Aleksander Prosen Kralj (Svoboda, Postojna) on 9 June 2022.
- Mateja Čalušić (Svoboda, Koper 2), forfeited his seat on 12 January 2024 upon being elected to the government and was replaced by Uroš Brežan (Svoboda, Tolmin) on 16 February 2024.
- Uroš Brežan (Svoboda, Tolmin) resigned on 30 January 2026. Brežan's seat as replacement for Mateja Čalušić was taken by Mojca Stegovec (Svoboda, Ajdovščina) on 3 February 2026.

==== 2010s ====
===== 2018 =====
Results of the 2018 parliamentary election held on 3 June 2018:

Party		Votes per electoral district											Total votes	%	Seats		
Party		Ajdovš- čina	Ilirska Bistrica	Izola	Koper 1	Koper 2	Nova Gorica 1	Nova Gorica 2	Piran	Postojna	Sežana	Tolmin	Total votes	%	Con.	Nat.	Tot.
Slovenian Democratic Party	SDS	3,498	1,335	930	1,026	1,762	3,372	2,586	1,002	2,481	1,792	2,739	22,523	21.79%	2	1	3
Social Democrats	SD	1,606	626	720	1,030	1,187	1,887	2,324	1,026	750	1,405	923	13,484	13.04%	1	1	2
The Left	Levica	963	520	785	1,554	1,593	1,063	1,717	880	1,041	1,332	588	12,036	11.64%	1	0	1
List of Marjan Šarec	LMŠ	961	544	572	876	1,342	1,044	950	621	1,158	1,157	795	10,020	9.69%	1	0	1
Modern Centre Party	SMC	593	478	727	822	1,234	929	956	698	925	854	699	8,915	8.62%	1	0	1
New Slovenia – Christian Democrats	NSi	1,787	696	197	408	644	1,038	734	270	604	512	989	7,879	7.62%	0	1	1
Party of Alenka Bratušek	SAB	356	280	348	628	719	876	1,043	470	490	1,028	400	6,638	6.42%	0	1	1
Democratic Party of Pensioners of Slovenia	DeSUS	289	486	510	538	616	814	613	458	408	640	410	5,782	5.59%	0	1	1
Slovenian National Party	SNS	244	253	176	264	409	360	268	155	258	489	206	3,082	2.98%	0	0	0
Pirate Party		256	93	157	279	271	281	284	188	228	287	183	2,507	2.43%	0	0	0
Slovenian People's Party	SLS	204	68	67	55	86	323	133	43	229	130	375	1,713	1.66%	0	0	0
Good Country	DD	105	85	182	156	262	147	228	153	122	164	102	1,706	1.65%	0	0	0
Movement Together Forward	GSN	83	62	143	131	186	115	234	73	41	267	77	1,412	1.37%	0	0	0
List of Journalist Bojan Požar	LNBP	191	47	82	93	157	138	104	79	77	88	49	1,105	1.07%	0	0	0
For a Healthy Society	ZD	66	22	75	79	120	99	83	82	45	85	184	940	0.91%	0	0	0
Andrej Čuš and Greens of Slovenia	AČZS	87	33	31	76	137	82	77	128	54	87	40	832	0.80%	0	0	0
United Left and Unity	ZLS	80	32	61	94	96	74	98	85	44	66	45	775	0.75%	0	0	0
United Slovenia	ZSi	124	20	22	44	66	95	118	33	23	56	45	646	0.62%	0	0	0
Economic Active Party	GAS	47	66	17	22	85	69	88	18	28	36	29	505	0.49%	0	0	0
Solidarity–For a Fair Society!		33	14	20	54	49	32	47	28	16	17	33	343	0.33%	0	0	0
Socialist Party of Slovenia	SPS	17	11	10	34	23	32	23	17	27	21	38	253	0.24%	0	0	0
Party of Slovenian People	SSN		9		12	22	18	17	20	14	20	12	144	0.14%	0	0	0
United Right		14	8	8	7	12	15	9	14	18	24	11	140	0.14%	0	0	0
Valid votes		11,604	5,788	5,840	8,282	11,078	12,903	12,734	6,541	9,081	10,557	8,972	103,380	100.00%	6	5	11
Rejected votes		230	102	120	146	225	170	166	115	97	188	137	1,696	1.61%			
Total polled		11,834	5,890	5,960	8,428	11,303	13,073	12,900	6,656	9,178	10,745	9,109	105,076	49.75%			
Registered electors		20,670	13,031	12,761	18,762	24,784	25,420	24,294	14,938	18,152	21,862	16,520	211,194				
Turnout		57.25%	45.20%	46.70%	44.92%	45.61%	51.43%	53.10%	44.56%	50.56%	49.15%	55.14%	49.75%				

The following candidates were elected:

- Constituency seats - Eva Irgl (SDS, Ajdovščina), 3,498 votes; Danijel Krivec (SDS, Tolmin), 2,739 votes; Matjaž Nemec (SD, Nova Gorica 2), 2,324 votes; Robert Pavšič (LMŠ, Postojna), 1,158 votes; Gregor Perič (SMC, Izola), 727 votes; and Matej Tašner Vatovec (Levica, Koper 1), 1,554 votes.
- National seats - Marko Bandelli (SAB, Sežana), 1,028 votes; Zvone Černač (SDS, Postojna), 2,481 votes; Meira Hot (SD, Piran), 1,026 votes; Branko Simonovič (DeSUS, Izola), 510 votes; and Jernej Vrtovec (NSi, Ajdovščina), 1,787 votes.

Substitutions:

- Marko Bandelli (SAB, Sežana) forfeited his seat on 13 September 2018 upon being elected to the government and was replaced by Andrej Šušmelj (SAB, Nova Gorica 2) on 26 September 2018.
- Andrej Šušmelj (SAB, Nova Gorica 2) forfeited his seat on 19 December 2018 when Marko Bandelli (SAB, Sežana) lost his government position, regaining his seat.
- Zvone Černač (SDS, Postojna) forfeited his seat on 13 March 2020 upon being elected to the government and was replaced by Elena Zavadlav Ušaj (SDS, Nova Gorica 1) on 19 March 2020.
- Jernej Vrtovec (NSi, Ajdovščina) forfeited his seat on 13 March 2020 upon being elected to the government and was replaced by Andrej Černigoj (NSi, Ilirska Bistrica) on 19 March 2020.

===== 2014 =====
Results of the 2014 parliamentary election held on 13 July 2014:

Party		Votes per electoral district											Total votes	%	Seats		
Party		Ajdovš- čina	Ilirska Bistrica	Izola	Koper 1	Koper 2	Nova Gorica 1	Nova Gorica 2	Piran	Postojna	Sežana	Tolmin	Total votes	%	Con.	Nat.	Tot.
Modern Centre Party	SMC	2,925	1,962	2,352	3,349	4,716	3,921	4,557	2,342	3,243	3,898	2,718	35,983	34.21%	4	0	4
Slovenian Democratic Party	SDS	3,379	1,170	715	926	1,370	3,069	2,310	875	2,082	1,637	2,526	20,059	19.07%	2	0	2
Democratic Party of Pensioners of Slovenia	DeSUS	831	693	864	1,193	1,438	1,324	1,237	1,071	698	1,134	742	11,225	10.67%	1	0	1
Social Democrats	SD	762	382	510	580	607	1,467	1,276	741	467	1,194	374	8,360	7.95%	0	1	1
United Left	ZL	626	214	448	880	891	682	1,103	457	490	720	408	6,919	6.58%	0	1	1
New Slovenia – Christian Democrats	NSi	1,422	222	136	219	469	890	542	207	472	410	670	5,659	5.38%	0	1	1
Alliance of Alenka Bratušek	ZaAB	380	267	320	540	655	565	909	397	483	653	455	5,624	5.35%	0	1	1
Positive Slovenia	PS	239	123	264	421	361	202	386	197	302	250	148	2,893	2.75%	0	0	0
Slovenian People's Party	SLS	273	250	92	113	247	449	206	92	267	216	550	2,755	2.62%	0	0	0
Pirate Party		200	0	95	206	242	192	216	147	162	190	135	1,785	1.70%	0	0	0
Slovenian National Party	SNS	156	83	113	104	178	166	147	116	104	240	139	1,546	1.47%	0	0	0
Verjamem		154	27	58	72	65	94	140	31	38	93	94	866	0.82%	0	0	0
Greens of Slovenia	ZS	62	46	39	51	74	66	86	45	41	71	60	641	0.61%	0	0	0
Civic List	DL	38	105	28	36	65	78	87	42	41	72	34	626	0.60%	0	0	0
Equal Land–Forward Slovenia	ED-NPS	21	22	32	21	21	19	30	27	17	23	0	233	0.22%	0	0	0
Valid votes		11,468	5,566	6,066	8,711	11,399	13,184	13,232	6,787	8,907	10,801	9,053	105,174	100.00%	7	4	11
Rejected votes		228	123	101	104	167	158	145	102	154	202	137	1,621	1.52%			
Total polled		11,696	5,689	6,167	8,815	11,566	13,342	13,377	6,889	9,061	11,003	9,190	106,795	50.54%			
Registered electors		20,530	13,192	12,873	18,807	24,183	25,625	24,409	15,029	18,140	21,655	16,853	211,296				
Turnout		56.97%	43.12%	47.91%	46.87%	47.83%	52.07%	54.80%	45.84%	49.95%	50.81%	54.53%	50.54%				

The following candidates were elected:

- Constituency seats - Tilen Božič (SMC, Izola), 2,352 votes; Erika Dekleva (SMC, Postojna), 3,243 votes; Marko Ferluga (SMC, Koper 1), 3,349 votes; Tomaž Gantar (DeSUS, Piran), 1,071 votes; Eva Irgl (SDS, Ajdovščina), 3,379 votes; Lilijana Kozlovič (SMC, Koper 2), 4,716 votes; and Danijel Krivec (SDS, Tolmin), 2,526 votes.
- National seats - Mirjam Bon Klanjšček (ZaAB, Nova Gorica 2), 909 votes; Matjaž Nemec (SD, Nova Gorica 1), 1,467 votes; Matej Tašner Vatovec (ZL, Koper 1), 880 votes; and Jernej Vrtovec (NSi, Ajdovščina), 1,422 votes.

Substitutions:

- Lilijana Kozlovič (SMC, Koper 2) resigned on 23 September 2016 and was replaced by Vlasta Počkaj (SMC, Sežana) on 27 September 2016.
- Tilen Božič (SMC, Izola) forfeited his seat on 23 September 2016 upon being appointed to the government and was replaced by Teja Ljubič (SMC, Ilirska Bistrica) on 27 September 2016.

===== 2011 =====
Results of the 2011 parliamentary election held on 4 December 2011:

Party		Votes per electoral district											Total votes	%	Seats		
Party		Ajdovš- čina	Ilirska Bistrica	Izola	Koper 1	Koper 2	Nova Gorica 1	Nova Gorica 2	Piran	Postojna	Sežana	Tolmin	Total votes	%	Con.	Nat.	Tot.
Zoran Janković's List – Positive Slovenia	LZJ-PS	2,272	1,826	2,832	4,178	4,355	3,308	4,327	2,892	3,644	3,644	1,944	35,222	26.97%	3	1	4
Slovenian Democratic Party	SDS	4,285	1,926	1,154	1,666	2,783	4,335	3,002	1,458	3,146	2,480	3,538	29,773	22.79%	2	1	3
Social Democrats	SD	1,838	842	1,408	1,833	2,286	3,650	4,684	1,574	1,102	2,863	1,158	23,238	17.79%	2	0	2
Gregor Virant's Civic List	LGV	1,326	732	621	856	1,216	1,396	1,175	703	931	1,101	909	10,966	8.40%	1	0	1
Democratic Party of Pensioners of Slovenia	DeSUS	783	788	661	912	1,328	984	758	805	607	1,155	717	9,498	7.27%	0	1	1
New Slovenia – Christian People's Party	NSi	1,583	229	141	273	515	1,104	645	222	512	353	735	6,312	4.83%	0	0	0
Slovenian People's Party	SLS	741	377	227	220	458	638	386	146	588	481	702	4,964	3.80%	0	0	0
Party for Sustainable; Development of Slovenia	TRS	120	73	150	252	224	185	307	163	183	212	147	2,016	1.54%	0	0	0
Slovenian National Party	SNS	101	123	98	115	293	214	224	111	106	203	202	1,790	1.37%	0	0	0
Liberal Democracy of Slovenia	LDS	90	71	101	126	161	222	140	99	121	184	140	1,455	1.11%	0	0	0
Youth Party – European Greens	SMS-Z	166	37	69	83	89	146	104	78	51	124	294	1,241	0.95%	0	0	0
Democratic Labour Party	DSD	418	59	39	65	121	121	80	54	52	141	65	1,215	0.93%	0	0	0
Zares		32	127	99	162	121	58	177	45	69	89	39	1,018	0.78%	0	0	0
Greens of Slovenia	ZS	31	29	43	67	73	59	54	53	36	77	51	573	0.44%	0	0	0
Movement for Slovenia	GZS	17	15	25	35	29	84	72	17	27	38	111	470	0.36%	0	0	0
Party of Slovenian People	SSN	27	19	14	18	27	37	15	28	20	48	27	280	0.21%	0	0	0
Party of Equal Opportunities	SEM-Si	16	8	9	18	57	27	30	11	7	17	13	213	0.16%	0	0	0
Acacias		5	10	15	36	36	14	16	12	13	28	27	212	0.16%	0	0	0
Party of Humane Slovenia	SHS	5	11	8	21	10	14	21	27	9	18	14	158	0.12%	0	0	0
Valid votes		13,856	7,302	7,714	10,936	14,182	16,596	16,217	8,498	11,224	13,256	10,833	130,614	100.00%	8	3	11
Rejected votes		230	184	179	222	269	276	207	158	197	288	227	2,437	1.83%			
Total polled		14,086	7,486	7,893	11,158	14,451	16,872	16,424	8,656	11,421	13,544	11,060	133,051	63.09%			
Registered electors		20,320	13,283	12,909	18,828	23,776	25,747	24,694	14,904	17,980	21,441	17,008	210,890				
Turnout		69.32%	56.36%	61.14%	59.26%	60.78%	65.53%	66.51%	58.08%	63.52%	63.17%	65.03%	63.09%				

The following candidates were elected:

- Constituency seats - Mirko Brulc (SD, Nova Gorica 1), 3,650 votes; Gašpar Gašpar Mišič (LZJ-PS, Koper 1), 4,178 votes; Lejla Hercegovac (LZJ-PS, Izola), 2,832 votes; Eva Irgl (SDS, Ajdovščina), 4,285 votes; Tina Komel (LZJ-PS, Koper 2), 4,355 votes; Danijel Krivec (SDS, Tolmin), 3,538 votes; Borut Pahor (SD, Nova Gorica 2), 4,684 votes; and Kristina Valenčič (LGV, Ilirska Bistrica), 732 votes.
- National seats - Jerko Čehovin (LZJ-PS, Postojna), 3,644 votes; Zvone Černač (SDS, Postojna), 3,146 votes; and Ivan Simčič (DeSUS, Ilirska Bistrica), 788 votes.

Substitutions:

- Zvone Černač (SDS, Postojna) forfeited his seat on 10 February 2012 upon being elected to the government and was replaced by Patricija Šulin (SDS, Nova Gorica 1) on 14 February 2012.
- Borut Pahor (SD, Nova Gorica 2) forfeited his seat on 22 December 2012 upon being elected President and was replaced by Ljubica Jelušič (SD, Sežana) on 28 December 2012.
- Patricija Šulin (SDS, Nova Gorica 1) forfeited her seat on 20 March 2013 when Zvone Černač (SDS, Postojna) lost his government position, regaining his seat.
- Tina Komel (LZJ-PS, Koper 2) forfeited her seat on 20 March 2013 upon being elected to the government and was replaced by Aljoša Jerič (LZJ-PS, Sežana) on 27 March 2013.
- Gašpar Gašpar Mišič (LZJ-PS, Koper 1) forfeited his seat on 2 April 2013 upon being appointed to the government and was replaced by Mirjam Bon Klanjšček (LZJ-PS, Nova Gorica 2) on 11 April 2013.
- Mirjam Bon Klan (LZJ-PS, Nova Gorica 2) forfeited her seat on 20 September 2013 when Gašpar Gašpar Mišič (LZJ-PS, Koper 1) lost his government position, regaining his seat.
- Gašpar Gašpar Mišič (LZJ-PS, Koper 1) resigned on 20 September 2013 and was replaced by Aljoša Jerič (LZJ-PS, Sežana) on the same day. Jerič's seat as replacement for Tina Komel was taken by Mirjam Bon Klan (LZJ-PS, Nova Gorica 2) on 20 September 2013.
- Mirjam Bon Klan (LZJ-PS, Nova Gorica 2) forfeited her seat on 24 February 2014 when Tina Komel (LZJ-PS, Koper 2) lost her government position, regaining her seat.

==== 2000s ====
===== 2008 =====
Results of the 2008 parliamentary election held on 21 September 2008:

Party		Votes per electoral district											Total votes	%	Seats		
Party		Ajdovš- čina	Ilirska Bistrica	Izola	Koper 1	Koper 2	Nova Gorica 1	Nova Gorica 2	Piran	Postojna	Sežana	Tolmin	Total votes	%	Con.	Nat.	Tot.
Social Democrats	SD	3,290	2,147	3,379	4,847	4,984	6,314	8,379	3,757	3,595	4,929	2,601	48,222	38.41%	4	1	5
Slovenian Democratic Party	SDS	5,261	2,243	1,409	1,853	2,997	5,110	3,652	1,526	3,417	2,952	4,164	34,584	27.55%	3	0	3
Zares		950	611	1,061	1,265	1,538	695	1,195	903	905	940	602	10,665	8.50%	1	0	1
Democratic Party of Pensioners of Slovenia	DeSUS	618	563	526	812	710	1,139	765	585	794	1,020	977	8,509	6.78%	0	1	1
Slovenian National Party	SNS	433	550	264	288	907	701	604	250	387	1,268	425	6,077	4.84%	0	1	1
Liberal Democracy of Slovenia	LDS	304	142	288	554	585	703	507	408	364	848	268	4,971	3.96%	0	0	0
Slovenian People's Party and Youth Party of Slovenia	SLS-SMS	255	479	70	131	306	367	166	108	623	229	985	3,719	2.96%	0	0	0
New Slovenia – Christian People's Party	NSi	836	141	57	180	279	562	334	143	238	192	495	3,457	2.75%	0	0	0
Lipa		521	57	151	201	239	249	177	152	183	241	93	2,264	1.80%	0	0	0
Greens of Slovenia	ZS	51	17	58	89	95	64	55	56	53	98	57	693	0.55%	0	0	0
Christian Democratic Party	SKD	96	93	19	31	54	76	91	25	32	53	77	647	0.52%	0	0	0
List for Justice and Development	LPR	17	14	47	48	37	42	92	30	25	113	12	477	0.38%	0	0	0
List for Clear Drinking Water	LZČPV	48	23	30	43	61	25	43	60	31	41	15	420	0.33%	0	0	0
Green Coalition: Green Party and Green Progress	ZL-ZP	19	39	21	25	61	13	33	6	59	49	11	336	0.27%	0	0	0
Party of Slovenian People	SSN	18	14	15	10	28	25	35	17	17	26	48	253	0.20%	0	0	0
Acacias		7	7	11	67	36	23	35	14	17	19	13	249	0.20%	0	0	0
Valid votes		12,724	7,140	7,406	10,444	12,917	16,108	16,163	8,040	10,740	13,018	10,843	125,543	100.00%	8	3	11
Rejected votes		257	229	124	216	253	272	256	148	220	253	230	2,458	1.92%			
Total polled		12,981	7,369	7,530	10,660	13,170	16,380	16,419	8,188	10,960	13,271	11,073	128,001	61.26%			
Registered electors		19,908	13,183	12,818	18,989	23,024	25,598	24,778	14,907	17,616	21,050	17,088	208,959				
Turnout		65.20%	55.90%	58.75%	56.14%	57.20%	63.99%	66.26%	54.93%	62.22%	63.05%	64.80%	61.26%				

The following candidates were elected:

- Constituency seats - Zvone Černač (SDS, Postojna), 3,417 votes; Eva Irgl (SDS, Ajdovščina), 5,261 votes; Franco Juri (Zares, Izola), 1,061 votes; Luka Juri (SD, Koper 1), 4,847 votes; Danijel Krivec (SDS, Tolmin), 4,164 votes; Borut Pahor (SD, Nova Gorica 2), 8,379 votes; Breda Pečan (SD, Izola), 3,379 votes; and Patrick Vlačič (SD, Piran), 3,757 votes.
- National seats - Mirko Brulc (SD, Nova Gorica 1), 6,314 votes; Vasja Klavora (DeSUS, Tolmin), 977 votes; and Srečko Prijatelj (SNS, Sežana), 1,268 votes.

Substitutions:

- Borut Pahor (SD, Nova Gorica 2) forfeited his seat on 7 November 2008 upon being elected Prime Minister and was replaced by Marijan Križman (SD, Koper 2) on 21 November 2008.
- Patrick Vlačič (SD, Piran) forfeited his seat on 21 November 2008 upon being elected to the government and was replaced by Miroslav Klun (SD, Sežana) on 16 December 2008.
- Srečko Prijatelj (SNS, Sežana)) forfeited his seat on 23 March 2011 upon being imprisoned for extortion and was replaced by Sara Viler (SNS, Koper 2) on 30 March 2011.

===== 2004 =====
Results of the 2004 parliamentary election held on 3 October 2004:

Party		Votes per electoral district											Total votes	%	Seats		
Party		Ajdovš- čina	Ilirska Bistrica	Izola	Koper 1	Koper 2	Nova Gorica 1	Nova Gorica 2	Piran	Postojna	Sežana	Tolmin	Total votes	%	Con.	Nat.	Tot.
Slovenian Democratic Party	SDS	3,735	2,064	1,207	1,339	2,052	4,177	3,198	1,409	2,901	2,595	3,777	28,454	24.66%	2	1	3
Liberal Democracy of Slovenia	LDS	1,722	1,120	1,598	2,109	2,122	2,951	2,761	2,087	2,183	3,170	1,635	23,458	20.33%	2	0	2
United List of Social Democrats	ZLSD	1,105	551	1,758	1,901	1,550	1,859	2,725	1,239	943	1,816	675	16,122	13.97%	1	1	2
New Slovenia – Christian People's Party	NSi	2,382	358	175	358	728	1,465	1,151	458	807	793	1,117	9,792	8.49%	1	0	1
Slovenia Is Ours	SN	281	374	278	2,218	2,347	831	1,129	475	260	196	102	8,491	7.36%	0	0	0
Slovenian National Party	SNS	438	393	304	463	727	737	818	362	638	870	396	6,146	5.33%	0	1	1
Democratic Party of Pensioners of Slovenia	DeSUS	307	455	388	586	636	526	585	427	333	503	1,079	5,825	5.05%	0	1	1
Slovenian People's Party	SLS	863	675	182	148	295	731	481	116	985	532	786	5,794	5.02%	0	1	1
Active Slovenia	AS	231	426	142	226	207	256	320	129	199	338	204	2,678	2.32%	0	0	0
Youth Party of Slovenia	SMS	134	111	71	90	135	291	272	156	146	186	514	2,106	1.83%	0	0	0
Women's Voice of Slovenia, Association for Primorska, Union of Independents of Slovenia and New Democracy of Slovenia	GZS- ZZP- ZNS- NDS	245	87	72	50	79	157	202	117	94	255	106	1,464	1.27%	0	0	0
June List	JL	78	33	107	73	106	124	192	95	71	150	103	1,132	0.98%	0	0	0
Greens of Slovenia	ZS	45	82	36	72	112	77	100	107	120	98	67	916	0.79%	0	0	0
Party of Slovenian People	SSN	50	28	16	22	53	203	197	29	28	61	31	718	0.62%	0	0	0
Marko Brecelj (Independent)	Ind	21	26	26	103	81	60	59	43	28	53	23	523	0.45%	0	0	0
List for Enterprising Slovenia	PS	116	14	12	40	68	38	76	23	14	41	37	479	0.42%	0	0	0
Party of Ecological; Movements of Slovenia	SEG	31	27	24	30	33	52	71	34	48	31	41	422	0.37%	0	0	0
United for an Independent and Just Slovenia		220	8	12	11	32	19	24	19	5	19	1	370	0.32%	0	0	0
Democratic Party of Slovenia	DS	77	15	19	31			52	27		35	31	287	0.25%	0	0	0
Mihael Svanjak (Independent)	Ind	3	4	21	60	55	5	9	13	3	15	3	191	0.17%	0	0	0
Valid votes		12,084	6,851	6,448	9,930	11,418	14,559	14,422	7,365	9,806	11,757	10,728	115,368	100.00%	6	5	11
Rejected votes		311	250	240	294	411	389	351	270	277	342	327	3,462	2.91%			
Total polled		12,395	7,101	6,688	10,224	11,829	14,948	14,773	7,635	10,083	12,099	11,055	118,830	59.71%			
Registered electors		18,588	12,181	12,296	18,670	21,376	24,793	24,160	14,578	16,484	19,450	16,440	199,016				
Turnout		66.68%	58.30%	54.39%	54.76%	55.34%	60.29%	61.15%	52.37%	61.17%	62.21%	67.24%	59.71%				

The following candidates were elected:

- Constituency seats - Andrej Bajuk (NSi, Ajdovščina), 2,382 votes; Eva Irgl (SDS, Ajdovščina), 3,735 votes; Danijel Krivec (SDS, Tolmin), 3,777 votes; Marko Pavliha (LDS, Piran), 2,087 votes; Breda Pečan (ZLSD, Izola), 1,758 votes; and Davorin Terčon (LDS, Sežana), 3,170 votes.
- National seats - Josip Bajc (SLS, Postojna), 985 votes; Aurelio Juri (ZLSD, Koper 1), 1,901 votes; Vasja Klavora (DeSUS, Tolmin), 1,079 votes; Srečko Prijatelj (SNS, Sežana), 870 votes; and Milan Zver (SDS, Ilirska Bistrica), 2,064 votes.

Substitutions:

- Andrej Bajuk (NSi, Ajdovščina) forfeited his seat on 3 December 2004 upon being elected to the government and was replaced by Ciril Testen (NSi, Tolmin) on 16 December 2004.
- Milan Zver (SDS, Ilirska Bistrica) forfeited his seat on 3 December 2004 upon being elected to the government and was replaced by Zvone Černač (SDS, Postojna) on 16 December 2004.

===== 2000 =====
Results of the 2000 parliamentary election held on 15 October 2000:

Party		Votes per electoral district											Total votes	%	Seats		
Party		Ajdovš- čina	Ilirska Bistrica	Izola	Koper 1	Koper 2	Nova Gorica 1	Nova Gorica 2	Piran	Postojna	Sežana	Tolmin	Total votes	%	Con.	Nat.	Tot.
Liberal Democracy of Slovenia	LDS	2,333	1,701	2,384	3,999	4,195	4,413	4,119	3,284	3,742	6,065	3,271	39,506	30.21%	3	1	4
United List of Social Democrats	ZLSD	1,553	1,224	2,197	3,420	2,597	3,045	5,616	1,920	1,415	1,715	1,767	26,469	20.24%	2	0	2
Social Democratic Party of Slovenia	SDSS	2,907	1,111	688	803	1,075	2,254	1,874	627	1,495	1,618	1,853	16,305	12.47%	1	0	1
Slovenian People's Party and Slovene Christian Democrats	SLS-SKD	1,536	874	315	336	957	2,090	960	370	1,354	975	1,460	11,227	8.58%	1	0	1
New Slovenia – Christian People's Party	NSi	1,555	636	368	538	769	1,774	1,203	560	1,332	626	1,306	10,667	8.16%	0	1	1
Democratic Party of Pensioners of Slovenia	DeSUS	543	1,160	461	618	818	1,398	794	527	596	830	734	8,479	6.48%	0	1	1
Youth Party of Slovenia	SMS	558	436	246	460	509	850	773	341	565	752	551	6,041	4.62%	0	1	1
Slovenian National Party	SNS	263	267	340	678	821	662	962	430	345	837	374	5,979	4.57%	0	0	0
New Party	NS	870	69	36	47	92	116	90	38	44	116	188	1,706	1.30%	0	0	0
Greens of Slovenia	ZS	79	79	153	136	204	150	155	219	81	146	55	1,457	1.11%	0	0	0
Democratic Party of Slovenia	DS	371	26	40	61	105	130	105	30	51	80	96	1,095	0.84%	0	0	0
Mojca		46	31	244	55	72	45	39	51	30	49	35	697	0.53%	0	0	0
Party of Democratic Action of Slovenia	SDAS	52	19	95	126	112	37	45	56	40	48	0	630	0.48%	0	0	0
Forward Slovenia	NPS	31	19	17	57	103	93	44	36	23	70	34	527	0.40%	0	0	0
Valid votes		12,697	7,652	7,584	11,334	12,429	17,057	16,779	8,489	11,113	13,927	11,724	130,785	100.00%	7	4	11
Rejected votes		451	429	419	337	492	661	434	353	445	590	630	5,241	3.85%			
Total polled		13,148	8,081	8,003	11,671	12,921	17,718	17,213	8,842	11,558	14,517	12,354	136,026	70.30%			
Registered electors		17,908	11,762	11,703	18,518	19,645	24,320	23,877	14,176	16,000	19,292	16,295	193,496				
Turnout		73.42%	68.70%	68.38%	63.03%	65.77%	72.85%	72.09%	62.37%	72.24%	75.25%	75.81%	70.30%				

The following candidates were elected:

- Constituency seats - Ivan Božič (SLS-SKD); Mihael Brejc (SDSS); Lucija Čok (LDS); Aurelio Juri (ZLSD); Borut Pahor (ZLSD); Dimitrij Rupel (LDS); and Davorin Terčon (LDS).
- National seats - Vojko Čeligoj (DeSUS); Ivan Mamić (NSi); Dorijan Maršič (LDS); and Igor Štemberger (SMS).

Substitutions:

- Lucija Čok (LDS) forfeited his seat on 30 November 2000 upon being elected to the government and was replaced by Mario Gasparini (LDS) on 19 December 2000.
- Dimitrij Rupel (LDS) forfeited his seat on 30 November 2000 upon being elected to the government and was replaced by Aleksander Merlo (LDS) on 19 December 2000.
- Mario Gasparini (LDS) forfeited his seat on 19 December 2002 when Lucija Čok (LDS) lost her government position, regaining her seat.
- Lucija Čok (LDS) resigned on 20 December 2002 and was replaced by Mario Gasparini (LDS) on 27 December 2002.
- Mihael Brejc (SDSS) forfeited his seat on 1 July 2004 upon being elected to the European Parliament and was replaced by Siniša Germovšek (SDSS) on 22 July 2004.
- Aleksander Merlo (LDS) forfeited his seat on 6 July 2004 when Dimitrij Rupel (LDS) lost his government position, regaining his seat.
- Borut Pahor (ZLSD) forfeited his seat on 20 July 2004 upon being elected to the European Parliament and was replaced by Breda Pečan (ZLSD) on 22 July 2004.
- Dorijan Maršič (LDS) forfeited his seat on 7 October 2004 upon being appointed director of the International Institution – Foundation for De-mining and Assistance to Mine Victims but was not replaced as the legislative term was close to expiring.

==== 1990s ====
===== 1996 =====
Results of the 1996 parliamentary election held on 10 November 1996:

Party		Votes per electoral district											Total votes	%	Seats		
Party		Ajdovš- čina	Ilirska Bistrica	Izola	Koper 1	Koper 2	Nova Gorica 1	Nova Gorica 2	Piran	Postojna	Sežana	Tolmin	Total votes	%	Con.	Nat.	Tot.
Liberal Democracy of Slovenia	LDS	2,108	1,232	2,105	3,180	3,336	3,839	4,052	2,326	3,398	4,292	3,071	32,939	25.06%	2	1	3
Slovenian People's Party	SLS	3,484	1,752	754	934	1,382	3,311	2,161	747	3,025	1,809	2,162	21,521	16.37%	1	1	2
Social Democratic Party of Slovenia	SDSS	2,810	1,747	598	1,061	1,157	2,237	1,722	949	1,529	2,349	1,821	17,980	13.68%	1	1	2
United List of Social Democrats	ZLSD	697	1,083	1,367	3,015	1,276	1,822	3,701	1,413	806	1,282	717	17,179	13.07%	1	1	2
Slovene Christian Democrats	SKD	1,487	448	408	527	1,125	2,133	1,396	439	949	905	1,894	11,711	8.91%	0	1	1
Slovenian Forum	SF	388	991	457	418	740	585	434	304	317	888	656	6,178	4.70%	0	0	0
Democratic Party of Pensioners of Slovenia	DeSUS	549	295	323	724	844	370	340	505	266	382	211	4,809	3.66%	0	1	1
Slovenian National Party	SNS	127	165	274	409	419	457	485	581	297	691	265	4,170	3.17%	0	0	0
Democratic Party of Slovenia	DS	171	91	120	379	240	269	595	161	205	230	159	2,620	1.99%	0	0	0
Greens of Slovenia	ZS	126	152	172	170	316	316	320	163	176	173	211	2,295	1.75%	0	0	0
National Labour Party	NSD	1,042	110	53	75	107	235	101	59	148	135	185	2,250	1.71%	0	0	0
Rudolf Šimac (Independent)	Ind	86	27	17	29	72	550	427	18	40	136	204	1,606	1.22%	0	0	0
Slovenian Craftsmen and Entrepreneurial; Party and Centrum Party	SOPS	68	60	132	189	323	171	156	194	59	95	70	1,517	1.15%	0	0	0
Marko Brecelj (Independent)	Ind	56	53	104	242	168	105	84	72	63	142	92	1,181	0.90%	0	0	0
Christian Social Union	KSU	83	49	46	74	91	126	40	51	44	105	99	808	0.61%	0	0	0
Liberal Party	LS	57	33	70	93	107	102	51	41	33	106	72	765	0.58%	0	0	0
Green Alternative of Slovenia	ZA	31	21	42	75	116	73	119	29	32	91	36	665	0.51%	0	0	0
Kristjan Verbič (Independent)	Ind	10	21	12	13	36	19	19	13	22	197	24	386	0.29%	0	0	0
Republican Association of Slovenia	RZS	11	20	13	24	52	56	26	70	20	49	27	368	0.28%	0	0	0
Slovenian National Right	SND	16	23	14	24	49	38	26	8	39	47	25	309	0.24%	0	0	0
Patriotic United Retirement Party and League for Slovenia	DEUS-LZS	0	0	0	83	123	0	0	0	0	0	0	206	0.16%	0	0	0
Valid votes		13,407	8,373	7,081	11,738	12,079	16,814	16,255	8,143	11,468	14,104	12,001	131,463	100.00%	5	6	11
Rejected votes													9,995	7.07%			
Total polled													141,458	75.60%			
Registered electors													187,115				
Turnout													75.60%				

The following candidates were elected:

- Constituency seats - Josip Bajc (SLS); Mario Gasparini (LDS); Ivo Hvalica (SDSS); Aurelio Juri (ZLSD); and Davorin Terčon (LDS).
- National seats - Ivan Božič (SKD); Vladimir Čeligoj (SDSS); Aleksander Merlo (LDS); Eda Okretič Salmič (DeSUS); Borut Pahor (ZLSD); and Branko Tomažič (SLS).

===== 1992 =====
Results of the 1992 parliamentary election held on 6 December 1992:

Party		Votes	%	Seats		
Party		Votes	%	Con.	Nat.	Tot.
Liberal Democracy of Slovenia	LDS	30,659	20.57%	2	0	2
United List	ZL	25,084	16.83%	1	1	2
Slovene Christian Democrats	SKD	20,545	13.78%	1	0	1
Slovenian National Party	SNS	12,824	8.60%	0	1	1
Slovenian People's Party	SLS	11,107	7.45%	0	1	1
Primorska Association	ZZP	9,030	6.06%	0	0	0
Democratic Party of Slovenia	DS	7,541	5.06%	0	1	1
Greens of Slovenia	ZS	5,247	3.52%	0	0	0
Social Democratic Party of Slovenia	SDSS	4,185	2.81%	0	0	0
Liberal Party	LS	3,462	2.32%	0	0	0
National Democratic Party and Slovenian Party	ND-SGS	3,276	2.20%	0	0	0
Socialist Party of Slovenia	SSS	2,834	1.90%	0	0	0
Slovenian Craftsmen and Entrepreneurial; Party and Centrum Party	SOPS	2,336	1.57%	0	0	0
Liberal Democratic Party of Slovenia	LDSS	1,828	1.23%	0	0	0
Independent Party	SN	1,563	1.05%	0	0	0
Christian Socialists, DS Forward and Free Party	KS-DS	1,460	0.98%	0	0	0
Independent	Ind	1,277	0.86%	0	0	0
Slovenian Ecological Movement	SEG	1,162	0.78%	0	0	0
Istrian Democratic Assembly	IDZ	1,125	0.75%	0	0	0
“SMER" Association of Slovenia	SMER	1,068	0.72%	0	0	0
DEMOS	DEMOS	812	0.54%	0	0	0
Movement for General Democracy	GOD	623	0.42%	0	0	0
Valid votes		149,048	100.00%	4	4	8
Rejected votes		12,286	7.62%			
Total polled		161,334	89.10%			
Registered electors		181,077				

The following candidates were elected:

- Constituency seats - Miroslav Geržina (SKD); Borut Pahor (ZL); Jadranka Šturm Kocjan (LDS); and Jaša Zlobec (LDS).
- National seats - Igor Bavčar (DS); Zoran Madon (SLS); Breda Pečan (ZL); and Marijan Poljšak (SNS).

Substitutions:

- Jaša Zlobec (LDS) forfeited his seat on 16 September 1993 upon being appointed ambassador to Belgium, Luxembourg and the Netherlands and was replaced by Janez Jug (LDS) on 5 October 1993.
