= Kozlovič =

Kozlovič (also spelt Kozlović) is a surname. The Croatian census of 2011 listed it as one of the most common surnames in Buje and Umag.

Notable people with the surname include:

- Lilijana Kozlovič, a Slovenian politician
- Tamara Kozlovič, a Slovenian politician
