= Koper (National Assembly constituency) =

Constituency in Slovenia

- Capodistria
- Constituency for the National Assembly
- Location of Koper within Slovenia
- Municipality: List: Izola; Koper; Piran
- Electorate: 2,822 (2026)
- Area: 376 km^{2} (2024)

Current Constituency
- Created: 1992
- Seats: 1 (1992–present)
- Deputies: Felice Ziza

Koper (Italian: Capodistria), officially known as the 9th constituency (Slovene: 9. volilna enota), is a special constituency (electoral unit) of the National Assembly, the national legislature of Slovenia, to elect a member of the Italian national community. The constituency was established in 1992 following Slovenia's independence from Yugoslavia. It consists of the municipalities of Izola, Koper and Piran. The constituency currently elects one of the 90 members of the National Assembly using a single round majority electoral system. At the 2026 parliamentary election the constituency had 2,822 registered electors.

== History ==
The 9th constituency (Koper) was one of the ten constituencies established by the Determination of Constituencies for the Election of Deputies to the National Assembly Act (ZDVEDZ) (Zakon o določitvi volilnih enot za volitve poslancev v državni zbor (ZDVEDZ)) passed by the Assembly of the Republic of Slovenia (Skupščina Republike Slovenije) in September 1992. It consisted of the municipalities of Izola, Koper and Piran.

== Electoral system ==
Koper currently elects one of the 90 members of the National Assembly using a single round majority electoral system. Prior to 2021, the Borda count ranked voting was used with voters ranking candidates in order of preference. These preferences were converted to points - each first preference received as many points as there were candidates, each second preference received one fewer point etc. The candidate with the most points was elected.

In addition to voting for an Italian candidate, electors belonging to the Italian national community in Koper may also vote for a candidate from the national parties in their electoral district. This means they have two votes, violating the principle of equal voting.

== Election results ==
=== 2020s ===
==== 2026 ====
Results of the 2026 parliamentary election held on 22 March 2026:

Candidate	Votes	%
Felice Ziza	802	41.45%
Alberto Scheriani	578	29.87%
Christian Poletti	347	17.93%
Stefano Destefano	208	10.75%
Valid votes	1,935	100.00%
Rejected votes	40	2.03%
Total polled	1,975	69.99%
Registered electors	2,822	

==== 2022 ====
Results of the 2022 parliamentary election held on 24 April 2022:

Candidate	Votes	%
Felice Ziza	1,127	60.36%
Maurizio Tremul	740	39.64%
Valid votes	1,867	100.00%
Rejected votes	51	2.66%
Total polled	1,918	69.92%
Registered electors	2,743	

=== 2010s ===
==== 2018 ====
Results of the 2018 parliamentary election held on 3 June 2018:

Candidate	Points	%
Felice Ziza	2,570	44.52%
Maurizio Tremul	2,160	37.42%
Bruno Orlando	1,043	18.07%
Total	5,773	100.00%
Valid votes	1,464	
Rejected votes	22	1.48%
Total polled	1,486	55.18%
Registered electors	2,693	

==== 2014 ====
Results of the 2014 parliamentary election held on 13 July 2014:

Candidate	Votes	%
Roberto Battelli	692	100.00%
Valid votes	692	100.00%
Rejected votes	120	14.78%
Total polled	812	31.00%
Registered electors	2,619	

==== 2011 ====
Results of the 2011 parliamentary election held on 4 December 2011:

Candidate	Votes	%
Roberto Battelli	1,009	100.00%
Valid votes	1,009	100.00%
Rejected votes	143	12.41%
Total polled	1,152	42.49%
Registered electors	2,711	

=== 2000s ===
==== 2008 ====
Results of the 2008 parliamentary election held on 21 September 2008:

Candidate	Points	%
Roberto Battelli	3,896	25.74%
Aurelio Juri	3,336	22.04%
Vladimiro Dellore	2,928	19.34%
Monica Luciano	2,827	18.68%
Sebastian Pelan	2,150	14.20%
Total	15,137	100.00%
Valid votes	1,337	
Rejected votes	48	3.47%
Total polled	1,385	50.57%
Registered electors	2,739	

==== 2004 ====
Results of the 2004 parliamentary election held on 3 October 2004:

Candidate	Votes	%
Roberto Battelli	1,015	100.00%
Valid votes	1,015	100.00%
Rejected votes	147	12.65%
Total polled	1,162	42.46%
Registered electors	2,737	

===== 2000 =====
Results of the 2000 parliamentary election held on 15 October 2000:

Candidate	Votes	%
Roberto Battelli	1,302	100.00%
Valid votes	1,302	100.00%
Rejected votes	198	13.20%
Total polled	1,500	54.55%
Registered electors	2,750	

=== 1990s ===
==== 1996 ====
Results of the 1996 parliamentary election held on 10 November 1996:

Candidate	Points	%
Roberto Battelli	3,067	31.17%
Alberto Scheriani	2,347	23.85%
Mario Steffe	2,258	22.95%
Gianfranco Siljan	2,167	22.02%
Total	9,839	100.00%
Valid votes	1,274	
Rejected votes	433	25.37%
Total polled	1,707	65.73%
Registered electors	2,597	

==== 1992 ====
Results of the 1992 parliamentary election held on 6 December 1992:

Candidate	Points	%
Roberto Battelli	1,907	55.28%
Amalia Petronio	1,543	44.72%
Total	3,450	100.00%
Valid votes	1,550	
Rejected votes	49	3.06%
Total polled	1,599	83.59%
Registered electors	1,913	
