= Irena Šinko =

Slovenian politician (born 1964)

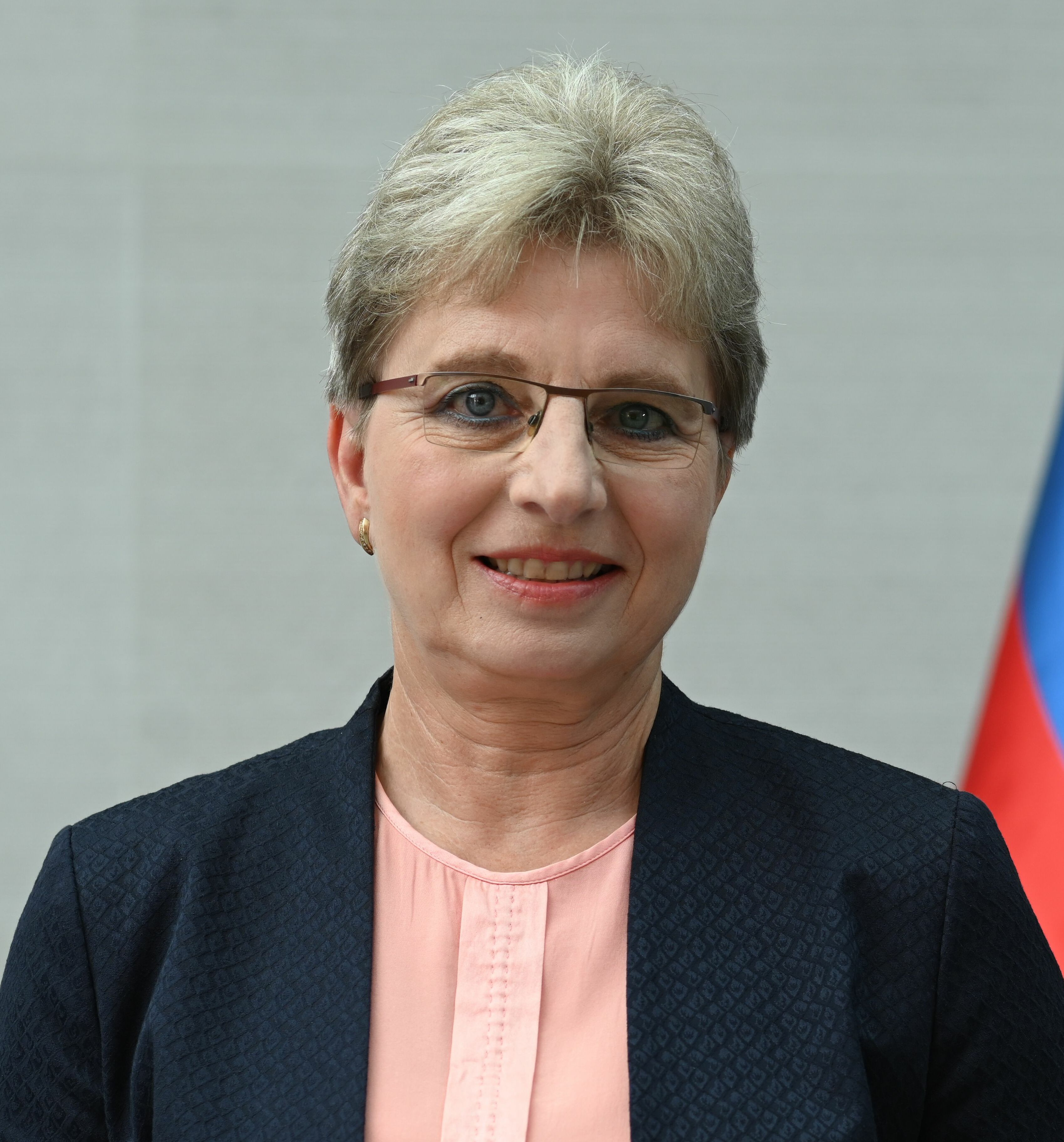
- Official portrait, 2022

Minister of Agriculture, Forestry and Food
- In office 1 June 2022 – 13 October 2023
- Succeeded by: Mateja Čalušić

Personal details
- Born: 5 January 1964 (age 62)
- Party: Freedom Movement (Slovenia)
- Education: University of Ljubljana

Irena Šinko (born 5 January 1964) is a lawyer and former Slovenian government official. She served as the minister of Agriculture, Forestry and Food of the Republic of Slovenia from 2022 until her dismissal in 2023.

== Early life and career ==
Šinko graduated with a degree in agricultural engineering from the University of Ljubljana and in law at the University of Maribor. She worked as a technologist in a feed factory in Lendava. From 1995, she headed the department of Agriculture and Economy in the administrative unit of Murska Sobota. Between 2010 and 2018, she served as the director of the state fund for Agricultural and Forest Land.

In June 2022, on the recommendation of the Freedom Movement, she took the position of the minister of Agriculture, Forestry and Food in the government of Robert Golob.

On 4 October 2023 Robert Golob sent a proposal to the National Assembly for her dismissal. A disagreement with the prime minister over the timely disclosure of possible pesticide contamination in some food products and nutria trapping in Ljubljana led to her leaving the government. She was dismissed at an extraordinary session on 13 October 2023; the dismissal was supported by 49 of the 62 deputies present.
