= Lendava (National Assembly constituency) =

Constituency in Slovenia

- Lendva
- Constituency for the National Assembly
- Location of Lendava within Slovenia
- Municipality: List: Dobronak; Hodos; Lendava; Moravske Toplice; Šalovci
- Electorate: 5,377 (2026)
- Area: 372 km^{2} (2024)

Current Constituency
- Created: 1992
- Seats: 1 (1992–present)
- Deputies: Ferenc Horváth

Lendava (Hungarian: Lendva), officially known as the 10th constituency (Slovene: 10. volilna enota), is a special constituency (electoral unit) of the National Assembly, the national legislature of Slovenia, to elect a member of the Hungarian national community. The constituency was established in 1992 following Slovenia's independence from Yugoslavia. It consists of the municipalities of Dobronak, Hodos, Lendava, Moravske Toplice and Šalovci. The constituency currently elects one of the 90 members of the National Assembly using a single round majority electoral system. At the 2026 parliamentary election the constituency had 5,377 registered electors.

== History ==
The 10th constituency (Lendava) was one of the ten constituencies established by the Determination of Constituencies for the Election of Deputies to the National Assembly Act (ZDVEDZ) (Zakon o določitvi volilnih enot za volitve poslancev v državni zbor (ZDVEDZ)) passed by the Assembly of the Republic of Slovenia (Skupščina Republike Slovenije) in September 1992. It consisted of the municipalities of Lendava and Murska Sobota.

Following the re-organisation of municipalities in October 1994, parts of Murska Sobota municipality were transferred to the newly created municipalities of Hodos–Sal and Moravske Toplice. In August 1998, parts of Hodos–Sal municipality were transferred to the newly created Šalovci municipality while Hodos–Sal was renamed Hodos; and parts of Lendava municipality were transferred to the newly created Dobronak municipality.

In February 2021, the National Assembly passed Amendments and Supplements to the Determination of Constituencies for the Election of Deputies to the National Assembly Act (ZDVEDZ-B) (Zakon o spremembah in dopolnitvah Zakona o določitvi volilnih enot za volitve poslancev v državni zbor (ZDVEDZ-B)) which defined the Lendava constituency as consisting of the municipalities of Dobronak, Hodos, Lendava, Moravske Toplice and Šalovci.

== Electoral system ==
Lendava currently elects one of the 90 members of the National Assembly using a single-round majority electoral system. Prior to 2021, the Borda count ranked voting was used with voters ranking candidates in order of preference. These preferences were converted to points - each first preference received as many points as there were candidates, each second preference received one fewer point etc. The candidate with the most points was elected.

In addition to voting for a Hungarian candidate, electors belonging to the Hungarian national community in Lendava may also vote for a candidate from the national parties in their electoral district. This means they have two votes, violating the principle of equal voting.

== Election results ==
=== 2020s ===
==== 2026 ====
Results of the 2026 parliamentary election held on 22 March 2026:

Candidate	Votes	%
Ferenc Horváth	2,336	72.46%
Tomi Horvat	888	27.54%
Valid votes	3,224	100.00%
Rejected votes	108	3.24%
Total polled	3,332	61.97%
Registered electors	5,377	

==== 2022 ====
Results of the 2022 parliamentary election held on 24 April 2022:

Candidate	Votes	%
Ferenc Horváth	2,026	57.74%
Mihael Kasaš	836	23.82%
Otto Močnek	647	18.44%
Valid votes	3,509	100.00%
Rejected votes	74	2.07%
Total polled	3,583	65.32%
Registered electors	5,485	

=== 2010s ===
==== 2018 ====
Results of the 2018 parliamentary election held on 3 June 2018:

Candidate	Points	%
Ferenc Horváth	4,193	60.20%
Gabriela Sobočan	2,772	39.80%
Total	6,965	100.00%
Valid votes	3,001	
Rejected votes	42	1.38%
Total polled	3,043	51.13%
Registered electors	5,952	

==== 2014 ====
Results of the 2014 parliamentary election held on 13 July 2014:

Candidate	Votes	%
László Göncz	2,265	100.00%
Valid votes	2,265	100.00%
Rejected votes	147	6.09%
Total polled	2,412	39.00%
Registered electors	6,184	

==== 2011 ====
Results of the 2011 parliamentary election held on 4 December 2011:

Candidate	Points	%
László Göncz	5,135	68.54%
Dušan Orban	2,357	31.46%
Total	7,492	100.00%
Valid votes	3,324	
Rejected votes	58	1.71%
Total polled	3,382	50.77%
Registered electors	6,661	

=== 2000s ===
==== 2008 ====
Results of the 2008 parliamentary election held on 21 September 2008:

Candidate	Points	%
László Göncz	11,003	26.25%
Mária Pozsonec	9,748	23.26%
Olga Požgai Horvat	7,561	18.04%
Albert Halasz	7,108	16.96%
Janez Somi	6,496	15.50%
Total	41,916	100.00%
Valid votes	3,699	
Rejected votes	69	1.83%
Total polled	3,768	53.35%
Registered electors	7,063	

==== 2004 ====
Results of the 2004 parliamentary election held on 3 October 2004:

Candidate	Preference votes					Total votes	Points	%
Candidate	1st	2nd	3rd	4th	5th	Total votes	Points	%
Mária Pozsonec	1,658	343	131	90	194	2,416	10,435	34.03%
Józef Kocoń	876	359	193	202	201	1,831	7,007	22.85%
Franc Vida	338	297	417	298	156	1,506	4,884	15.93%
Tomka György	327	212	254	336	375	1,504	4,297	14.01%
Janez Bogdan	245	226	304	328	339	1,442	4,040	13.18%
Total	3,444	1,437	1,299	1,254	1,265	8,699	30,663	100.00%
Valid votes							3,464	
Rejected votes							128	3.56%
Total polled							3,592	54.72%
Registered electors							6,564	

===== 2000 =====
Results of the 2000 parliamentary election held on 15 October 2000:

Candidate	Points	%
Mária Pozsonec	12,830	33.76%
Józef Kocoń	10,614	27.93%
Janez Somi	5,213	13.72%
Jožef Hančik	5,086	13.38%
József Mursics	4,262	11.21%
Total	38,005	100.00%
Valid votes	4,397	
Rejected votes	225	4.87%
Total polled	4,622	64.36%
Registered electors	7,181	

=== 1990s ===
==== 1996 ====
Results of the 1996 parliamentary election held on 10 November 1996:

Candidate	Points	%
Mária Pozsonec	10,264	42.85%
Albert Halasz	5,655	23.61%
Tomka György	4,880	20.37%
Geza Puhan	3,155	13.17%
Total	23,954	100.00%
Valid votes	3,545	
Rejected votes	534	13.09%
Total polled	4,079	65.91%
Registered electors	6,189	

==== 1992 ====
Results of the 1992 parliamentary election held on 6 December 1992:

Candidate	Points	%
Mária Pozsonec	25,335	33.04%
Jožef Horvat	6,455	8.42%
Elizabeta Bernjak	10,259	13.38%
Tomka György	14,786	19.28%
József Mursics	8,656	11.29%
David Janos	5,544	7.23%
Vili Herženjak	5,648	7.37%
Total	76,683	100.00%
Valid votes	4,936	
Rejected votes	209	4.06%
Total polled	5,145	79.51%
Registered electors	6,471	
