= Municipality of Ankaran =

Municipality of Slovenia

Municipality of Ankaran: Občina Ankaran; Comune di Ancarano
- Municipality
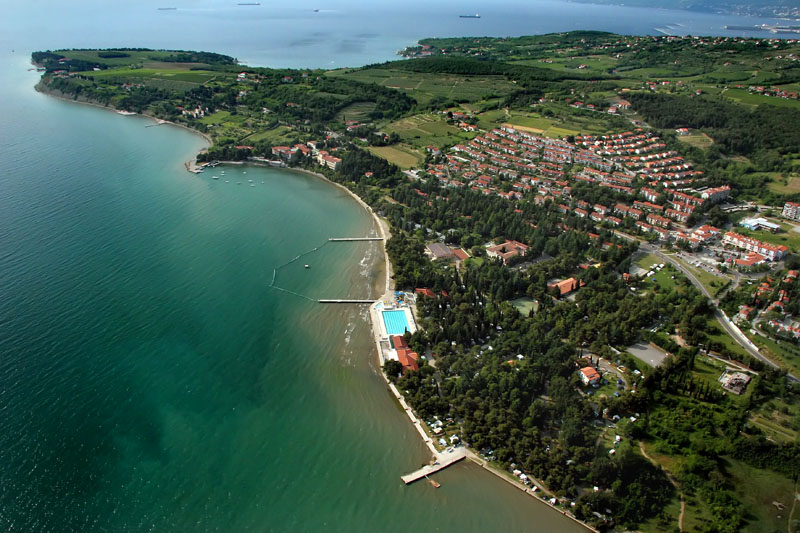

- Coat of arms

- Location of the Municipality of Ankaran in Slovenia
- Coordinates: 45°35′N 13°44′E
- Country: Slovenia

Government
  - Mayor: Gregor Strmčnik (Independent)

Area
  - Total: 8.0 km^{2} (3.1 sq mi)

Population (2016)
  - Total: 3,227
  - Density: 400/km^{2} (1,000/sq mi)
- Time zone: UTC+01 (CET)
  - Summer (DST): UTC+02 (CEST)
- Area code: +386 (0)5
- Vehicle registration: KP
- Website: www.obcina-ankaran.si

The Municipality of Ankaran (pronounced [aŋkaˈɾaːn]; Slovene: Občina Ankaran) is a municipality on the coast of the Adriatic Sea in southwestern Slovenia. Its seat and only settlement is Ankaran. It was formed in 2011, when it was split from the Municipality of Koper and is Slovenia's youngest municipality and with a population of just over 3,000, it is one of Slovenia's smallest municipalities. It borders Italy.

== History and establishment ==
The Municipality of Ankaran was officially established in 2011, when it was split from the Municipality of Koper, following several referendums. The initiative began in the late 1990s, with the decisive referendum taking place in 2009, when a majority of the Ankaran residents voted to split from Koper.

== Geography and location ==
The Municipality of Ankaran is a coastal municipality, bordering the Adriatic Sea. To the north, it borders Italy and the Municipality of Koper. Close to the Italian border, the municipality is an hour's drive from Slovenia's capital Ljubljana. The area is characterised by a mild Mediterranean climate, greenery, vineyards, and olive groves.

== Governance and development ==
Oriented on development, the Municipality of Ankaran won the 2023 Golden Rock award as Slovenia's most development-oriented municipality. Since its establishment, the municipality invested in education, health care, security, a police station, culture, and sport, with the local residents directly deciding how to spend half the budget.

== Tourism ==
The Municipality of Ankaran is a popular tourist destination due to sunny location, mild climate, and lush vegetation. In the past monks established there the Monastery of St. Nicholas The municipality offers tourists well-maintained beaches, such as Valdoltra, Študent and Debeli rtič, as well as swimming pools, sports fields, and a kilometre-long sandy beach known as San Nicolò.

== Community and identity ==
The Municipality of Ankaran is a bilingual community, speaking Slovenian and Italian.
