= Lucija Čok =

Slovene linguist

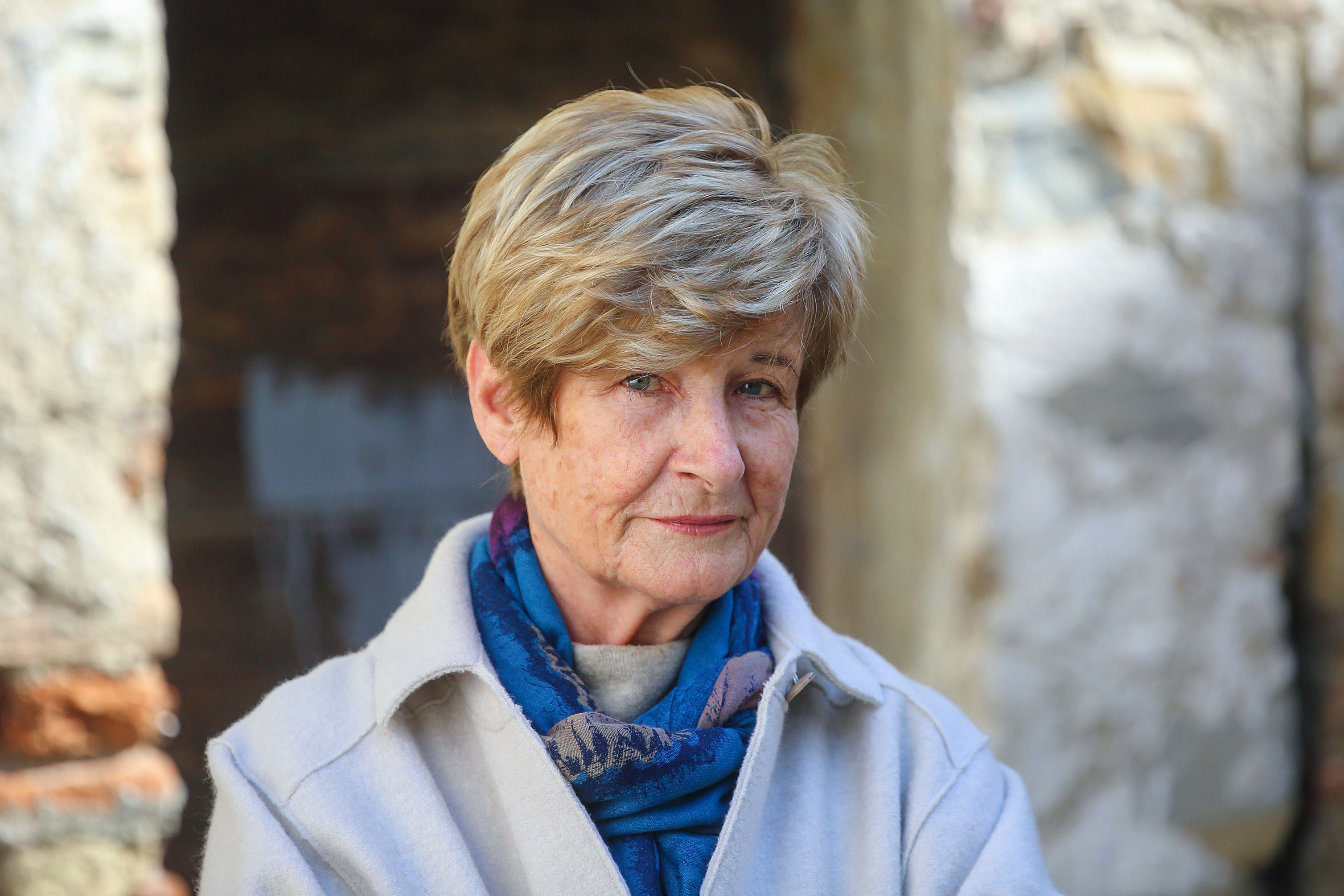
- Born: 7 April 1941 (age 85); Lokavec
- Honours: Légion d'honneur, Cavaliere della repubblica

Lucija Čok (born in 1941, Slovenia) is a Slovene linguist, senior researcher in the field of multilingualism and a professor of multilingualism and intercultural communication. Throughout her career, she has held several important positions, including that of the Minister of Education, Science and Sport (2000–2002) of the Government of the Republic of Slovenia. In her role as the Minister, she contributed to the establishment of higher education institutions in the Slovene region of Primorska and in 2003 she was elected as the first rector of the newly established university. She participated in European Commission high expert panels that have shaped linguistic policies and strategies of higher education and research. She has facilitated the preparation of the formal basis for Slovenia’s integration into the European Research Area. She was an expert of the Institutional evaluation program board (IEP EUA) and member of the Council of the Slovenian Quality Assurance Agency for Higher Education. Her research work and publications focus on the formation of models of bilingual education in areas of linguistic and cultural contact, sociolinguistic and didactics of intercultural communication. In 2013, the University of Primorska named her professor emeritus. The same year, she received a lifetime achievement award for her work in the field of Higher Education by the Ministry of Education, Science and Sport.

== Education and career ==
Following her graduation in the French and Italian languages and literature, she earned a Master's Degree in pedagogy of the Italian language and a PhD in Educational Sciences at the Faculty of Arts in Ljubljana. She taught at the Faculty of Education and at the Faculty of Arts at the University of Ljubljana. From 1995 to 2000 she was the director of the Scientific Research Centre in Koper.

She has cooperated for a decade in the project group for the establishment of the University in Primorska, in the framework of which she heads expert groups, laying the groundwork for what became the Faculty of Humanities in 2000. In the period 2000 – 2002, she was a member of the Slovenian government. In January 2003, she was appointed as acting director of the newly established University of Primorska and in 2003, she was elected as the first rector of the university. During her mandate, she channelled her efforts into the reform process of university activities and quality assurance, the integration of research and educational work at the university, students’ active participation in higher education reform and into the formation of an open, top-notch and innovative Slovene university that cooperates with the economic sector (Board of Trustees, Consortium of Technical Education in Primorska). In 2013, the University of Primorska named her professor emeritus. She is a scientific advisor at the Science and Research Centre (SRC Koper).

== Research work ==
Her research is focused on phenomena related to languages and cultures in contact, language learning and teaching, sociolinguistics and promotion of linguistic diversity, as well as to education that encourages the peaceful coexistence of various cultures and ethnic groups. Her research findings have been published in several foreign languages and she has lectured at many foreign universities. She has headed and co-ordinated national and international projects in the fields of didactics of foreign languages, early multilingualism and intercultural communication. Her work focuses on the formation of models of bilingual education in areas of linguistic and cultural contact and of didactics of intercultural communication.

== Achievements and honours ==
- 1999, Knight of the Order of Academic Palms for the promotion of French language and culture (Chevalier des Palmes Accademiques), Ministry of Culture, Republic of France;
- 2005, Commander of the Order of the Star of Italian Solidarity, awarded by the President of the Republic of Italy;
- 2006, Knight of the Legion of Honour (Chevalier de la Légion d'honneur), awarded by the President of the Republic of France.
- 2013, Lifetime Achievement in Higher Education Award, conferred by the Ministry of Education, Science and Sport of the Republic of Slovenia

== Selected publications ==
- ČOK, Lucija. Lost in translation : expressivity and style between the French original and the Slovenian translation. In: MIKOLIČ, Vesna (ed.). Language and culture in the intercultural world. Newcastle upon Tyne: Cambridge Scholars Publishing, 2020. Str. 402-417. ISBN 978-1-5275-5688-1. COBISS 47714819
- ČOK, Lucija. L'education interculturelle : espace ouvert aux rencontres de la raison et de la foi. Poligrafi : revija za religiologijo, mitologijo in filozofijo. [Tiskana izd.]. 2018, letn. 23, št. 89/90, str. 139-149, 154, 458-159. ISSN 1318-8828. http://www.zrs-kp.si/index.php/research-2/zalozba/poligrafi/. COBISS 2558931, [SNIP]
- ČOK, Lucija. Culture in languages: multiplicity of interpretations. V: LESENCIUC, Adrian (ur.). [Wor(l)ds : selection of papers presented within 4th RCIC Conference, Brasov, 21–23 May 2015, (International Conference "Redefining Community in Intercultural Context" (Print), ISSN 2285-2689, vol. 4, no. 1). Brasov: 'Henri Coandǎ' Air Force Academy Publishing House, 2015, str. 7-16. COBISS 1537706948
- ČOK, Lucija, CAVAION, Irina Moira. Virtual and live in the second language classroom. V: SCHRAMMEL-LEBER, Barbara (ur.), KORB, Christina (ur.). Dominated Languages in the 21st Century : papers from the International conference on minority languages XIV, (Grazer Plurilingualismus Studien, 1). Graz: Karl-Franzens-Universität, 2015, str. 208-223. COBISS 1537534660
- Čok, Lucija, Jasmina Žgank, Doris Sodja, Tina Čok, Janez Vrečko, and Salvator Žitko. 2014. Srečko in Peter: esej o prijateljstvu med Petrom Martincem in Srečkom Kosovelom. Koper: Kulturno društvo Peter Martinc.
- ČOK, Lucija, ZADEL, Maja. Linguistic plurality in European countries : Slovenian Istria between a policy of coexistence and the issue of immigration. V: CARUANA, Sandro (ur.), COPOSESCU, Liliana (ur.), SCAGLIONE, Stefania (ur.). Migration, multilingualism and schooling in Southern Europe. Newcastle upon Tyne: Cambridge Scholars Publishing, cop. 2013, str. 343-367, ilustr., graf. prikazi. COBISS 2377427
- ČOK, Lucija. L'italiano e le lingue comunitarie in prospettiva interculturale : applicazione di una ricerca. V: ČOK, Lucija. Hic et nunc aude! : ustanovitev Univerze na Primorskem v času in prostoru, (Knjižnica Annales Majora). Koper: Univerza na Primorskem, Znanstveno-raziskovalno središče, Univerzitetna založba Annales: Zgodovinsko društvo za južno Primorsko, 2013. 251 str., ilustr. ISBN 978-961-6732-33-8.
- ČOK, Lucija. Hic et nunc aude!: Ustanovitev Univerze na Primorskem v času in prostoru. Koper: Univerzitetna Založba Annales. 2013 https://zdjp.si/wp-content/uploads/2020/12/Lucija-%C4%8Cok-HIC-ET-NUNC-AUDE-2020.pdf
- ČOK, Lucija, ZUDIČ ANTONIČ, Nives. Italian : the Italian language in education in Slovenia, (Regional dossiers series). 1st ed. Ljouwert = Leeuwarden: Mercator European Research Centre on Multilingualism and Language Learning, cop. 2012. 75 str., graf. prikazi.
- ČOK, Lucija, ZADEL, Maja. Slovenska Istra med politiko sožitja in priseljeništvom = Slovenian Istria between coexistence policy and immigration. Koper: Univerza na Primorskem, Znanstveno-raziskovalno središče, Univerzitetna založba Annales, 2012. 107 str., tabele, zvd. ISBN 978-961-6862-14-1.
- ČOK, Lucija. Intercultural education within the curricula. V: ČEBRON, Neva (ur.). Intercultural communicative competence across the high school curriculum : case studies drawing on insights gained from the Permit project. Koper: University of Primorska, Science and Research Center, Annales University Press, 2012, str. 65-81
- ŠURAN, Fulvio (ur.), DEGHENGHI OLUJIĆ, Elis (ur.), SCOTTI JURIĆ, Rita (ur.). Problematiche e prospettive della lingua e della cultura italiana in una società in trasformazione : atti del Convegno internazionale "Trent'anni di studi di italianistica a Pola: passato, presente, futuro" : Pola, 20 e 21 settembre 2008. Pola: Università Juraj Dobrila, Dipartimento di studi in lingua italiana, 2010, str. 41-52. COBISS 2026195
- ČOK, Lucija. Language policy for cultural and social cohesion. V: NEWBY, David (ur.), PENZ, Hermine (ur.). Languages for social cohesion : language education in a multilingual and multicultural Europe : European Centre for Modern Languages of the Council of Europe, 2004-2007. Strasbourg: Council of Europe, cop. 2009, str. 25-34. COBISS 512547456
- ČOK, Lucija. Comunicazione linguistica culturale : strumento di tolleranza o coscentizzazione?. V: DA RIF, Bianca Maria (ur.), PIRAS, Tiziana (ur.). Civiltà italiana e geografie d'Europa : XIX Congresso A.I.S.L.L.I., 19-24 settembre 2006, Trieste, Capodistria, Padova, Pola : relazioni. Trieste: EUT, Edizioni Università di Trieste, cop. 2009, str. 124-130. COBISS 1767379
- ČOK, Lucija. La langue et la culture françaises en Slovénie au prisme du passé commun. V: VAUDAY, Patrick (ur.), et al. Histoire de l'oubli en contextes postsocialiste et postcolonial = Zgodovina pozabe v postsocialističnem in postkolonialističnem kontekstu, (Knjižnica Annales Majora). Koper: Université de Primorska, Centre de recherches scientifiques, Maison d'édition Annales: Société d'historie de Primorska Sud, 2009, str. 361-372. COBISS 1752531
- ČOK, Lucija, PERTOT, Susanna. Bilingual education in the ethnically mixed areas along the Slovene-Italian border. Comparative education, ISSN 0305-0068, 2010, vol. 46, iss. 1, str. 63-78. doi:10.1080/03050060903538699
