= List of constituencies in Slovenia =

The National Assembly of Slovenia is divided in eight national constituencies, and two special constituencies, for elections of representatives of national minorities (Italian and Hungarian). Each of the eight constituencies has approximately 200,000 voters. Each constituency consists of eleven electoral districts, and eleven MPs are elected from each constituency, although not necessary one in each of the electoral districts.

The 88 districts are named after the 62 municipalities existing before 1994.

== List of constituencies and districts ==
#	Constituency	Electoral districts										
#	Constituency	1	2	3	4	5	6	7	8	9	10	11
1	Kranj	Jesenice	Radovljica I	Radovljica II	Kranj I	Kranj II	Kranj III	Tržič	Škofja Loka I	Škofja Loka II	Kamnik	Idrija
2	Postojna	Tolmin	Piran	Izola	Koper I	Koper II	Sežana	Ilirska Bistrica	Postojna	Nova Gorica I	Nova Gorica II	Ajdovščina
3	Ljubljana Center	Logatec	Vrhnika	Ljubljana Vič-Rudnik I	Ljubljana Vič-Rudnik II	Ljubljana Vič-Rudnik III	Ljubljana Vič-Rudnik IV	Ljubljana Center	Ljubljana Šiška I	Ljubljana Šiška II	Ljubljana Šiška III	Ljubljana Šiška IV
4	Ljubljana Bežigrad	Kočevje	Ribnica	Grosuplje	Litija	Ljubljana Moste-Polje I	Ljubljana Moste-Polje II	Ljubljana Moste-Polje III	Ljubljana Bežigrad I	Ljubljana Bežigrad II	Domžale I	Domžale II
5	Celje	Šentjur pri Celju	Celje I	Celje II	Žalec I	Žalec II	Mozirje	Velenje I	Velenje II	Slovenj Gradec	Ravne na Koroškem	Radlje ob Dravi
6	Novo Mesto	Črnomelj	Novo Mesto I	Novo Mesto II	Trebnje	Brežice	Krško	Sevnica	Laško	Hrastnik	Trbovlje	Zagorje ob Savi
7	Maribor	Šmarje pri Jelšah	Slovenska Bistrica	Slovenske Konjice	Ruše	Maribor I	Maribor II	Maribor III	Maribor IV	Maribor V	Maribor VI	Maribor VII
8	Ptuj	Lendava	Ormož	Ljutomer	Murska Sobota I	Murska Sobota II	Gornja Radgona	Lenart	Pesnica	Ptuj I	Ptuj II	Ptuj III
9	Koper	Representative of Italian national minority										
10	Lendava	Representative of Hungarian national minority										
