= Matej Arčon =

Slovenian politician (born 1972)

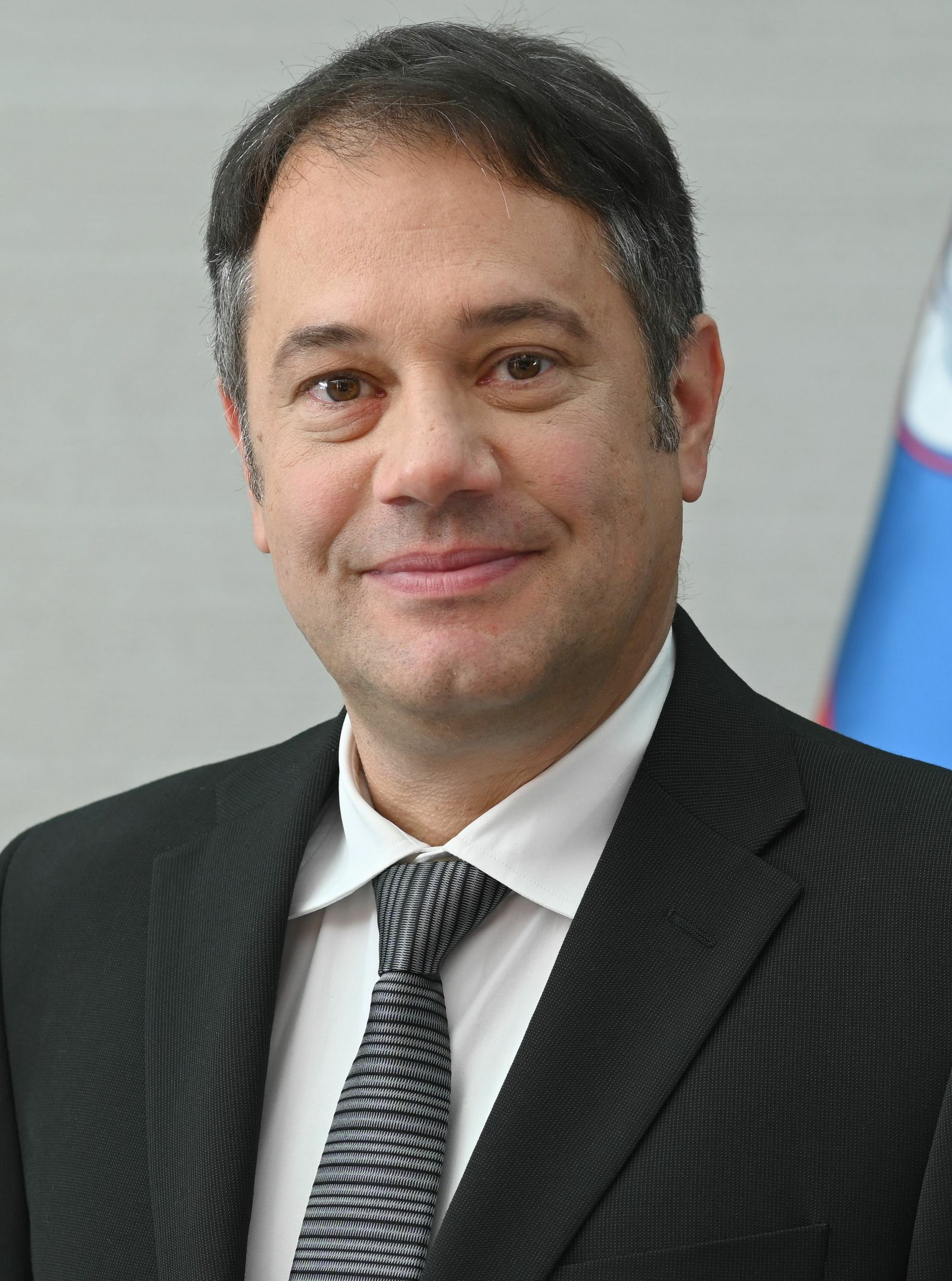
- Official portrait, 2022

Deputy of the National Assembly (Slovenia)
- Incumbent
- Assumed office May 2022
- Constituency: Postojna – Nova Gorica

Mayor of Nova Gorica
- In office October 2014 – 2018

Personal details
- Born: 4 November 1972 (age 53) Šempeter pri Gorici, SR Slovenia, SFR Yugoslavia
- Party: GS (since 2022)
- Occupation: Politician

Matej Arčon (born 4 November 1972) is a Slovenian politician.

== Career ==
Between 1998 and 2010 he was a member of the city council of Nova Gorica. In 2004, he was elected deputy mayor of Nova Gorica. He served as deputy mayor till 2006 and re-elected deputy mayor in October 2007. From 2007 to 2012 he was a member of the National Council (Slovenia), where he represented the local interests of Nova Gorica. In 2010, as the LDS candidate, who also received the support of the SDS, NSi and Zares parties in the second round, as well as Robert Golob and Gregor Veličkov's list, he was elected mayor of Nova Gorica in October 2014. He competed again in the local elections in 2018, when he received the most votes in the first round, and was defeated by Klemen Miklavič.

On 26 January 2022 Robert Golob introduced him as the General Secretary of his Slovenian political party, Freedom Movement. He also ran on the party list in the parliamentary elections and received the highest number of votes from all elected candidates of about 15,271.

He ran in the districts of Nova Gorica 1 and Nova Gorica 2.
