= Aurelio Juri =

Slovenian politician

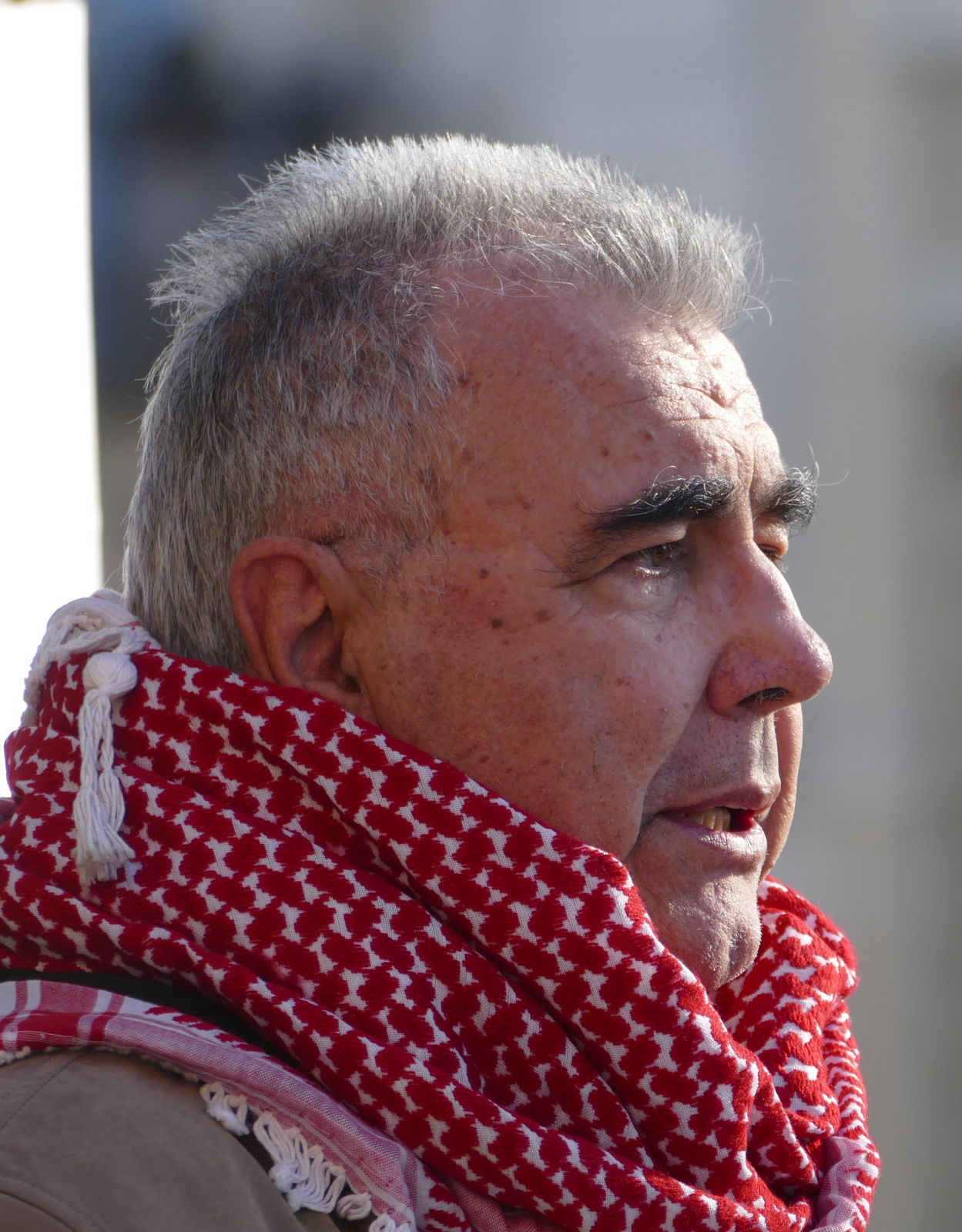
Image of Aurelio Juri

Aurelio Juri (born 27 July 1949) is a Slovenian politician and journalist of Italian ethnic origin. Between 2008 and 2009, he served as Member of the European Parliament. He was an influential member of the Social Democrats, before he left the party in 2009.

Juri was born in an Italian-speaking family of Friulian descent in Pula, Croatia, then part of Yugoslavia. He spent his childhood in the Slovenian coastal town of Koper, where he started his political career in the League of Communists of Slovenia. In 1978, he became a member of the Town Council. A staunch supporter of the reformist wing of the party led by Milan Kučan, became a member of the Central Committee of the Communist Party of Slovenia in 1989, one year before the democratic changes in Slovenia. Between 1986 and 1990, he also served as chairman of the autonomous organization of the Italian Community of Koper.

In 1994, he became mayor of Koper, but resigned in 1996, after being elected to the Slovenian National Assembly on the list of the United List of Social Democrats. He remained in Parliament for three consecutive terms. In November 2008, he replaced the party leader Borut Pahor, who was elected Prime Minister of Slovenia, as a member of the European Parliament.

His brother Franco Juri is a prominent cartoonist, musician, and politician. His son Luka Juri is also a journalist and prominent Social Democrat politician.
