= Eva Irgl =

Slovenian politician (born 1976)

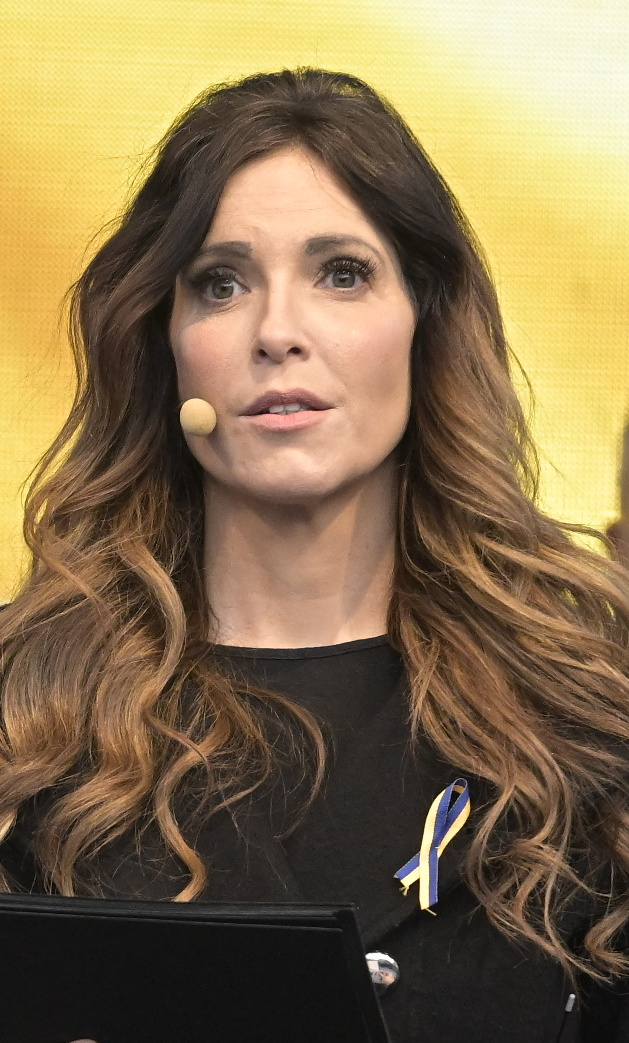

Member of the National Assembly for Ajdovščina Electoral District
- In office 3 October 2004 – 10 April 2026

Personal details
- Born: 9 December 1976 (age 49) Šempeter pri Gorici, Nova Gorica, SFR Yugoslavia
- Party: Democrats (since 2024)
- Other political affiliations: Slovenian Democratic Party (2004–2024)

Eva Irgl (born 9 December 1976) is a Slovenian politician and former TV host who served as member of the Slovenian National Assembly.

== Life and career ==
Eva Irgl was born in Šempeter near Nova Gorica in western Slovenia, then part of former Yugoslavia. She was the daughter of an elementary schoolmaster. She spent her childhood in Vipava, Slovenia. She finished the grammar school in Ajdovščina and studied theology at the University of Ljubljana. During her studies, she had passed an audition for the Slovenian national television. She had hosted a TV show for three years and assisted in a morning programme. She also wrote columns for the Mag magazine, which had at the time a right of centre editorial policy.

In the 2004 parliamentary elections, she was elected to the Slovenian National Assembly on the list of the Slovenian Democratic Party. She was re-elected in 2008, 2011, 2014, 2018 and 2022

As an MP, she is sitting in the following parliamentary committees:

- Commission for Petitions, Human Rights and Equal Opportunities (chair)
- Committee on Domestic Policy, Public Administration and Justice (Member)
- Committee on Higher Education, Science and Technological Development (Member)

Besides Slovene, she is fluent in English, Serbo-Croatian and Italian.
