= 2000 Slovenian parliamentary election =

- 15 October 2000
- All 90 seats in the National Assembly; 46 seats needed for a majority
- Turnout: 70.09% (▼3.58 pp)
Party	Leader	Vote %	Seats	+/–
LDS	Janez Drnovšek	36.26	34	+9
SDS	Janez Janša	15.81	14	−2
ZLSD	Borut Pahor	12.08	11	+2
SLS–SKD	Franc Zagožen	9.54	9	−20
NSi	Andrej Bajuk	8.66	8	New
DeSUS	Janko Kušar	5.17	4	−1
SNS	Zmago Jelinčič	4.39	4	0
SMS–Zeleni	Dominik Černjak	4.34	4	New
This lists parties that won seats. See the complete results below.
Prime Minister before	Prime Minister after
Andrej Bajuk; NSi	Janez Drnovšek; LDS

Parliamentary elections were held in Slovenia on 15 October 2000, after a successful vote of no confidence defeated the government of Andrej Bajuk. The result was a victory for Liberal Democracy of Slovenia, which won 34 of the 90 seats. Following the election, Liberal Democracy leader Janez Drnovšek returned to the post of Prime Minister.

== Results ==
Party	Votes	%	Seats	+/–
Liberal Democracy of Slovenia	390,306	36.26	34	+9
Slovenian Democratic Party	170,228	15.81	14	–2
United List of Social Democrats	130,079	12.08	11	+2
Slovenian People's Party–Slovene Christian Democrats	102,691	9.54	9	–20
New Slovenia	93,247	8.66	8	New
Democratic Party of Pensioners of Slovenia	55,634	5.17	4	–1
Slovenian National Party	47,214	4.39	4	0
Youth Party of Slovenia	46,674	4.34	4	New
Greens of Slovenia	9,691	0.90	0	0
Democratic Party of Slovenia	8,079	0.75	0	0
New Party	6,338	0.59	0	0
Voice of Slovenian Women	4,745	0.44	0	New
Forward Slovenia	3,300	0.31	0	0
Party of Democratic Action	3,208	0.30	0	New
Communist Party of Slovenia	1,945	0.18	0	0
Regional Party of Styria	732	0.07	0	New
Independents	2,409	0.22	0	0
Minority representatives			2	0
Total	1,076,520	100.00	90	0
Valid votes	1,076,520	96.69		
Invalid/blank votes	36,904	3.31		
Total votes	1,113,424	100.00		
Registered voters/turnout	1,588,528	70.09		
Source: DVK

== Opinion polls ==
Fieldwork date	Polling firm	Publisher(s)	Sample size	LDS	SLS	SDS	ZLSD	DeSUS	NSi	SNS	Others	None	Und.	Abst.	Lead	Source
3–6 Oct 2000	Ninamedia		1,200	25.8	3.7	6.2	6.0	1.7	4.0	2.3	0.9		41.6	7.9	19.6	
27–29 Sep 2000	Ninamedia		1,000	19.0	2.6	4.6	3.2	2.0	2.7	1.1	0.9		53.6	10.2	14.4	
19–20 Sep 2000	Ninamedia		1,000	21.1	2.4	6.4	5.3	0.6	1.6	0.9	0.2		55.2	6.3	14.7	
11–13 Sep 2000	Ninamedia		1,000	27.3	4.5	8.0	6.2	1.1	4.7	0.4	0.5		37.7	9.5	19.3	
