= Tamara Kozlovič =

Slovenian politician (born 1978)

Member of the National Assembly
- Incumbent
- Assumed office 13 May 2022
- Constituency: Postojna – Koper I

Personal details
- Born: 2 July 1978 (age 47)
- Party: Freedom Movement (since 2022)

Tamara Kozlovič (born 2 July 1978) is a Slovenian politician serving as a member of the National Assembly since 2022. She is the chairwoman of the health committee.
