= Mateja Čalušić =

Slovenian politician

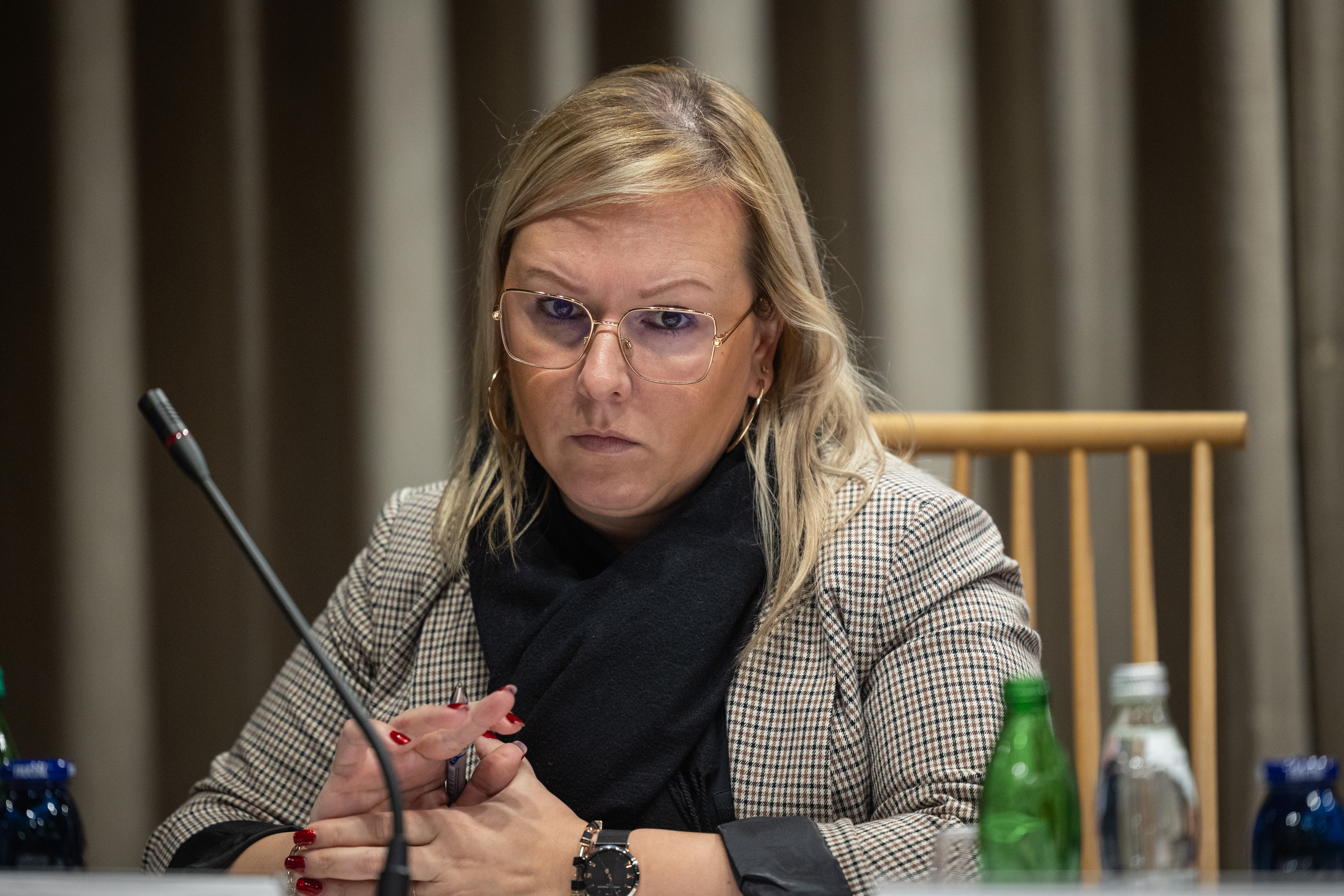
- Čalušić in 2026

Minister of Agriculture, Forestry and Food
- In office 12 January 2024 – 4 June 2026
- Prime Minister: Robert Golob
- Preceded by: Irena Šinko
- Succeeded by: Janez Cigler Kralj

Member of the National Assembly
- In office 13 May 2022 – 12 January 2024

Personal details
- Born: 5 September 1987 (age 38) Koper, SR Slovenia, SFR Yugoslavia
- Party: Freedom Movement
- Education: University of Ljubljana

Mateja Čalušić (born 5 September 1987) is a Slovenian politician. She served as the minister of agriculture, forestry and food of the Republic of Slovenia from January 2024 until June 2026

== Early life and education ==
Mateja Čalušić holds a bachelor degree in applied science in agriculture from the biotechnical faculty of the University of Ljubljana.

== Political career ==
After the 2022 Slovenian parliamentary election, Čalušić became a member of the National Assembly for the political party Freedom Movement and was vice president of the committee on agriculture, forestry and food.

On 4 January 2024, Prime Minister Robert Golob proposed to his government that Čalušić become the new Minister of Agriculture, Forestry and Food after the resignation of Irena Šinko in October 2023. On 12 January 2024, Čalušić was sworn in by the National Assembly and took over from the interim minister, Marjan Šarec.

In January 2025, Čalušić introduced measures to prohibit the confinement of egg-laying hens in battery cages by 2029 and the castration of piglets without anesthetic by 2026. The measures were approved by the National Assembly in July 2025, overriding the veto of the National Council.
