= Bitnje =

Bitnje may refer to several settlements in Slovenia:

- Bitnje, Bohinj, a settlement in the Municipality of Bohinj
- Spodnje Bitnje, a settlement in the Municipality of Kranj
- Srednje Bitnje, a settlement in the Municipality of Kranj
- Zgornje Bitnje, a settlement in the Municipality of Kranj
