= Struževo =

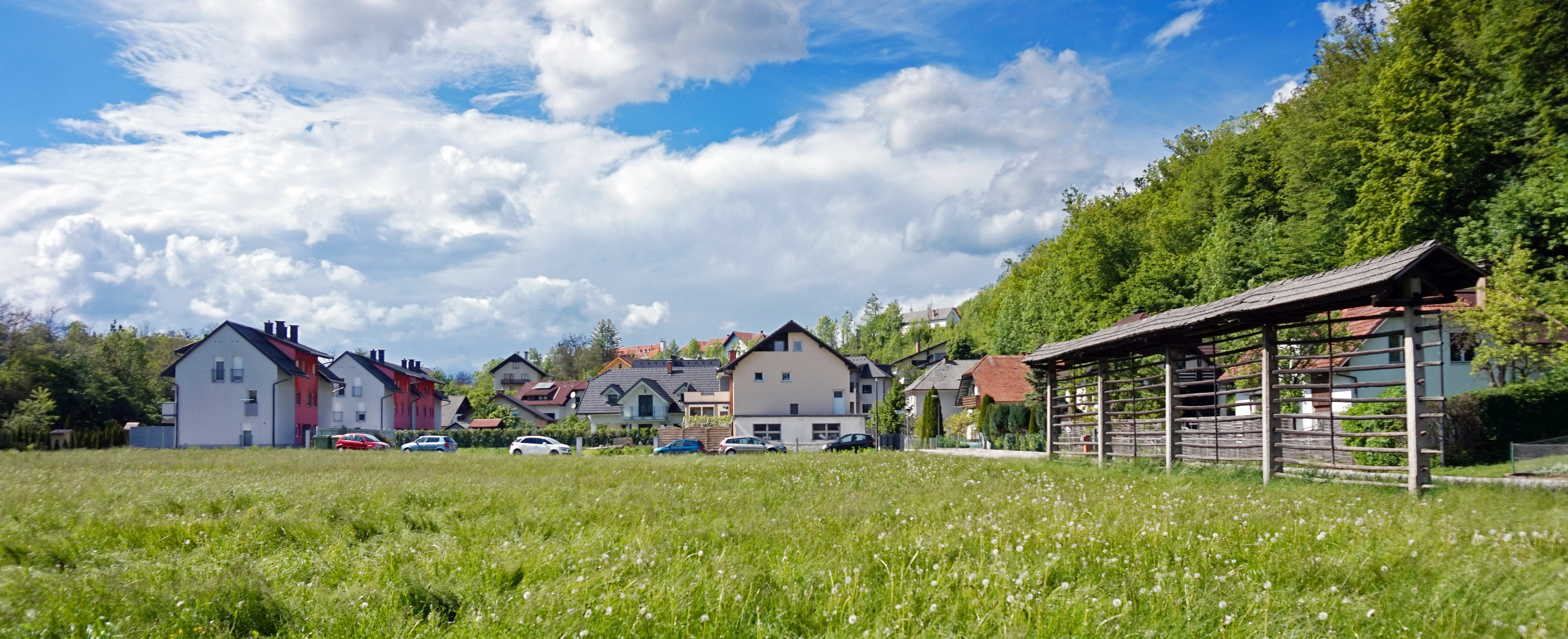

- Location in Slovenia
- Coordinates: 46°15′05.78″N 14°20′19.09″E
- Country: Slovenia
- Traditional region: Upper Carniola
- Statistical region: Upper Carniola
- Municipality: Kranj

Struževo (pronounced [stɾuˈʒeːʋɔ]; locally Strževo and in older sources also Straževo, German: Sterscheu) is a former settlement in the Municipality of Kranj in the Upper Carniola region of Slovenia. It now corresponds to the neighborhood of Struževo in Kranj. It is located above the Sava River at the edge of the Naklo Valley. There is a railroad bridge across the Sava below the village.

== Name ==
Struževo was attested in written records in 1497 as Strisew bei Nagkl. It was also known as locally (and sometimes officially) as Strževo, and in older sources also Straževo and Strževo pri Naklem. In the past, the German name of the settlement was Sterscheu.

== History ==
Struževo was annexed by the city of Kranj in 1957, ending its existence as a separate settlement.

== Notable people ==
Notable people that were born or lived in Struževo include:

- Blaž Potočnik (1799–1872), poet, textbook writer, and religious writer
- Ivo Slavec (nom de guerre Jokl, 1916–1943), Slovene Partisan and People's Hero of Yugoslavia
