= Sutna =

Sutna may refer to:

- Šutna, Kranj
- Šutna, Krško
- Satna
