= Čirčiče =

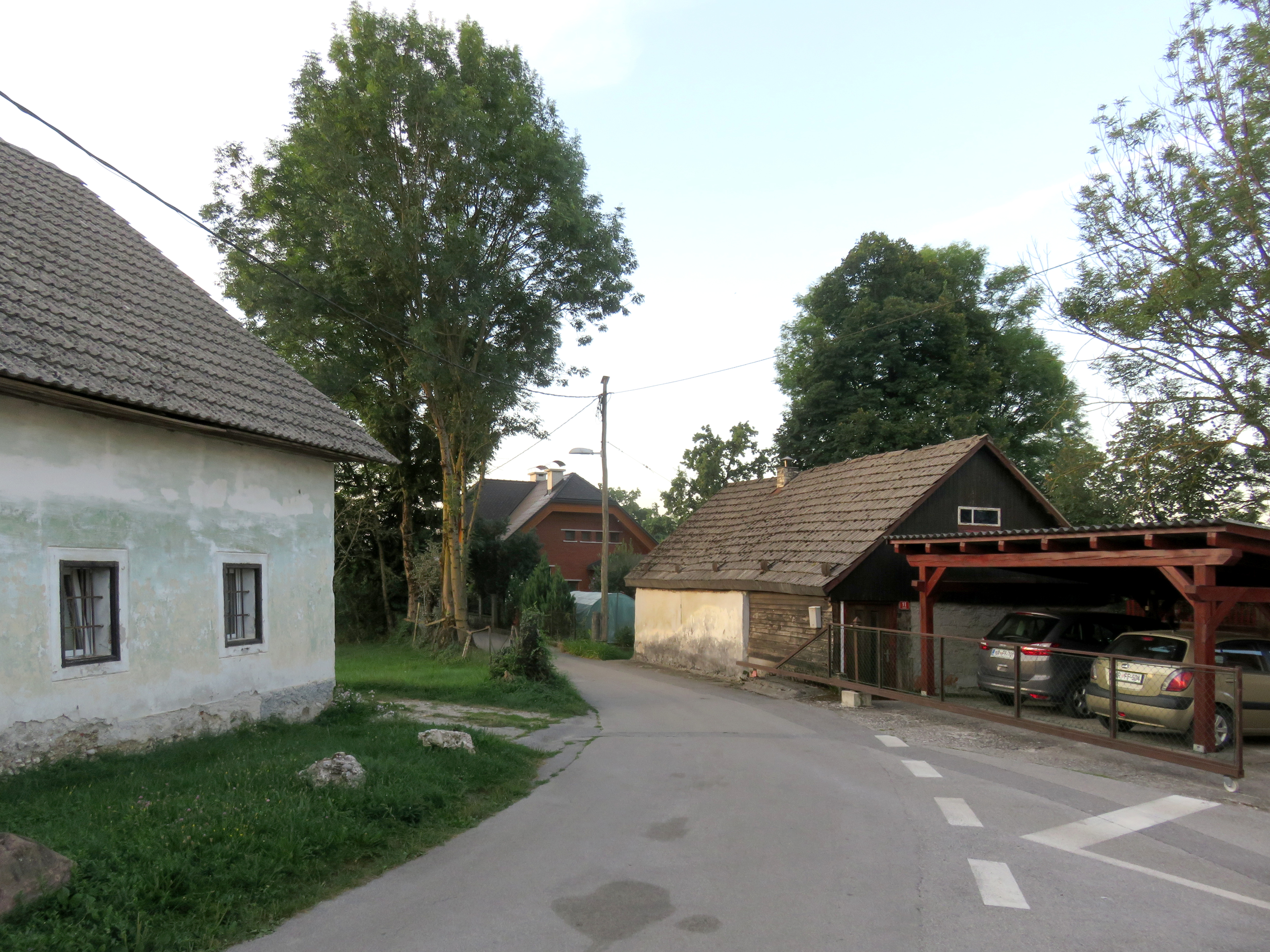

- Location in Slovenia
- Coordinates: 46°13′26.09″N 14°22′18.60″E
- Country: Slovenia
- Traditional region: Upper Carniola
- Statistical region: Upper Carniola
- Municipality: Kranj
- Elevation: 380 m (1,250 ft)

Čirčiče (pronounced [ˈtʃiːɾtʃitʃɛ]; German: Zirtschitsch) is a former settlement in the Municipality of Kranj in the Upper Carniola region of Slovenia. It now corresponds to the neighborhood of Čirče in Kranj.

== Name ==
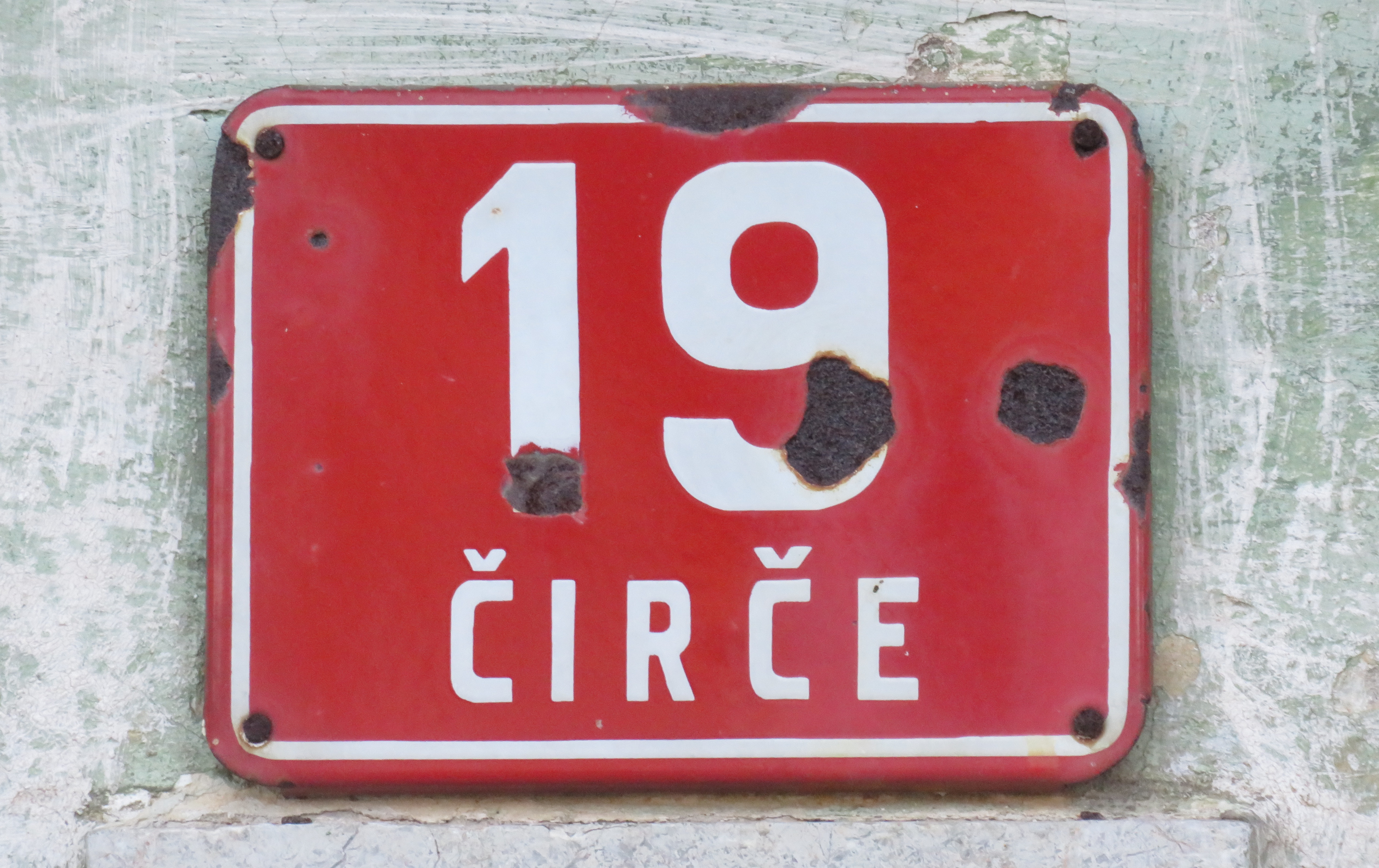
A house sign in Čirčiče

Čirčiče was mentioned in written sources in 1363 as Czyczericz and Cziczericz pey Chrainpurg (and as Ziecricz pey Chrainburg in 1369). The medieval attestations indicate that the name was originally *Čičerič(an)e, which can be derived from the Slavic personal name *Čičerъ, thus meaning 'Čičerъ's people'. Locally, the settlement was also called Čirče, a syncopated form that is also the name of the corresponding neighborhood in Kranj today. In the past the German name was Zirtschitsch.

== History ==
Čirčiče was annexed by the city of Kranj in 1957, ending its existence as a separate settlement.

== Church ==
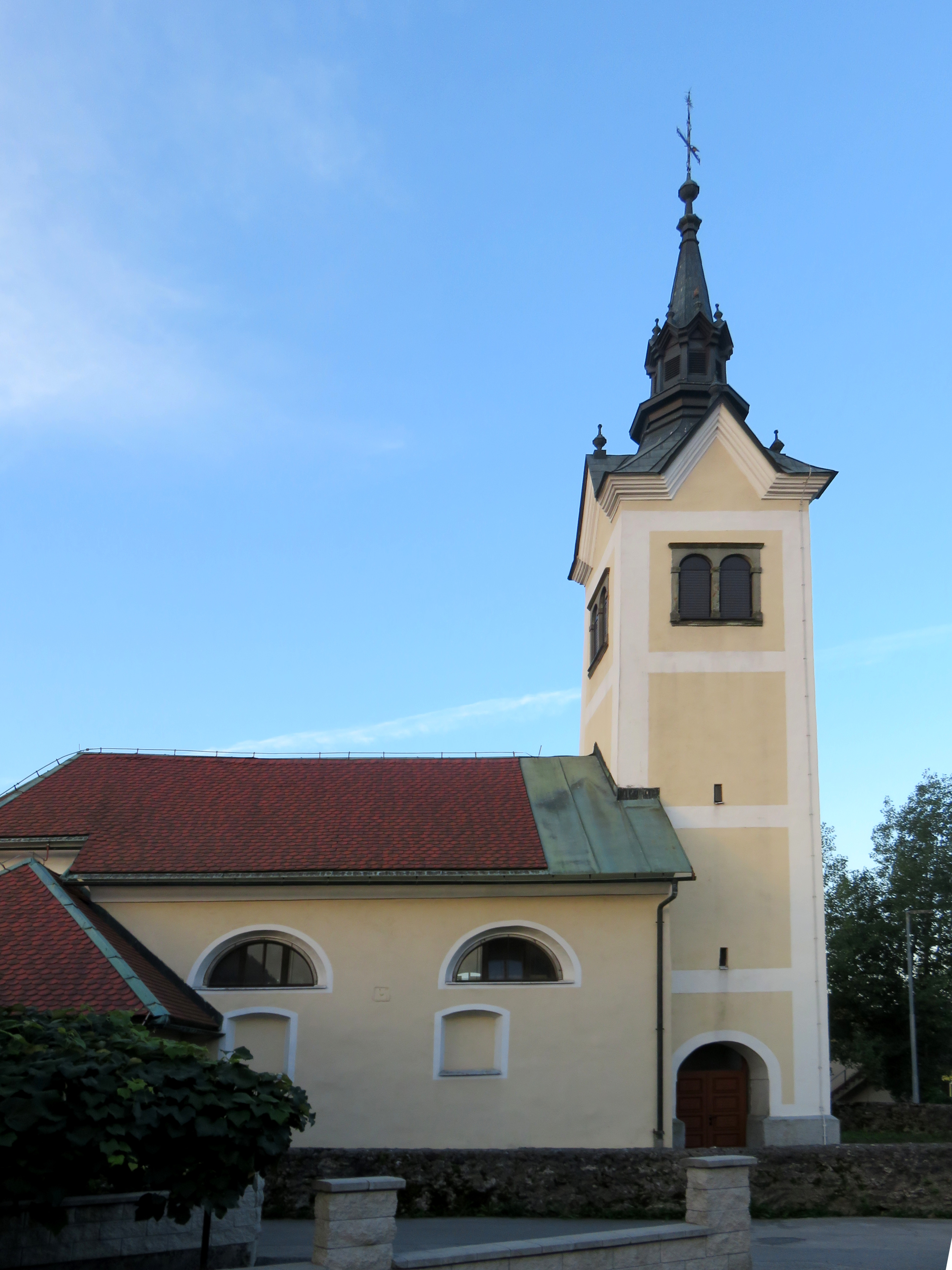
Saint Oswald's Church

The church in Čirčiče is dedicated to Saint Oswald (Slovene: sveti Ožbalt). It initially belonged to the Parish of Preddvor, but was transferred to the Parish of Kranj in 1794. The main gold altar is from 1679, while the other church furnishings originated in the 18th and 19th centuries. The former flat ceiling of the nave was replaced with a vaulted ceiling in 1848, and the church was renovated in 1931. The altar painting is by Franz Wissiak (a.k.a. Franc Vizjak, 1810–1880).
