= Čadovlje, Kranj =

Čadovlje
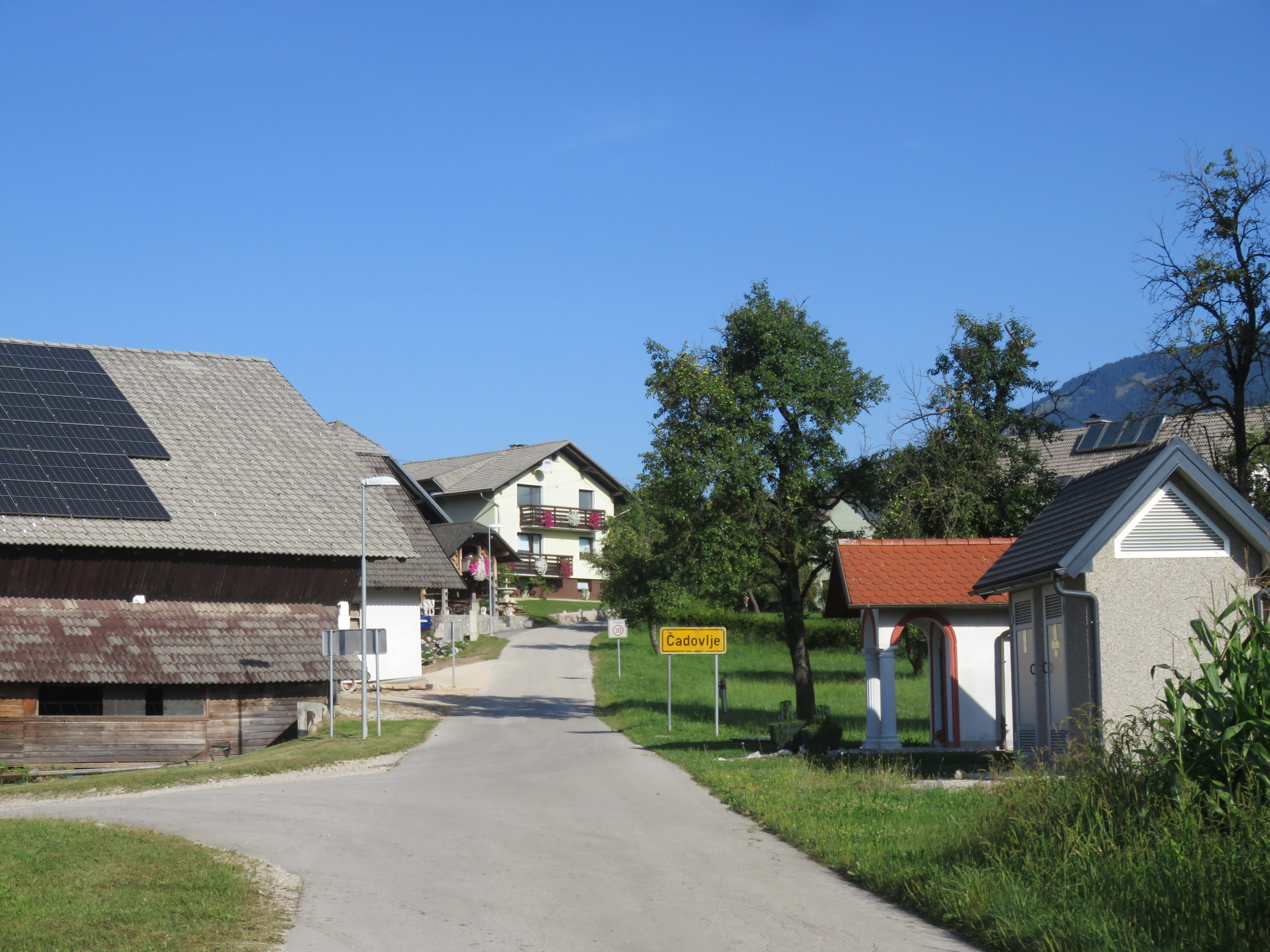

- Location in Slovenia
- Coordinates: 46°18′31.72″N 14°22′35.59″E
- Country: Slovenia
- Traditional region: Upper Carniola
- Statistical region: Upper Carniola
- Municipality: Kranj

Area
  - Total: 1.09 km^{2} (0.42 sq mi)
- Elevation: 488.7 m (1,603 ft)

Population (2002)
  - Total: 94

Čadovlje (pronounced [ˈtʃaːdɔu̯ljɛ]; German: Otschadoule) is a small settlement in the Municipality of Kranj in the Upper Carniola region of Slovenia.
