= Povlje =

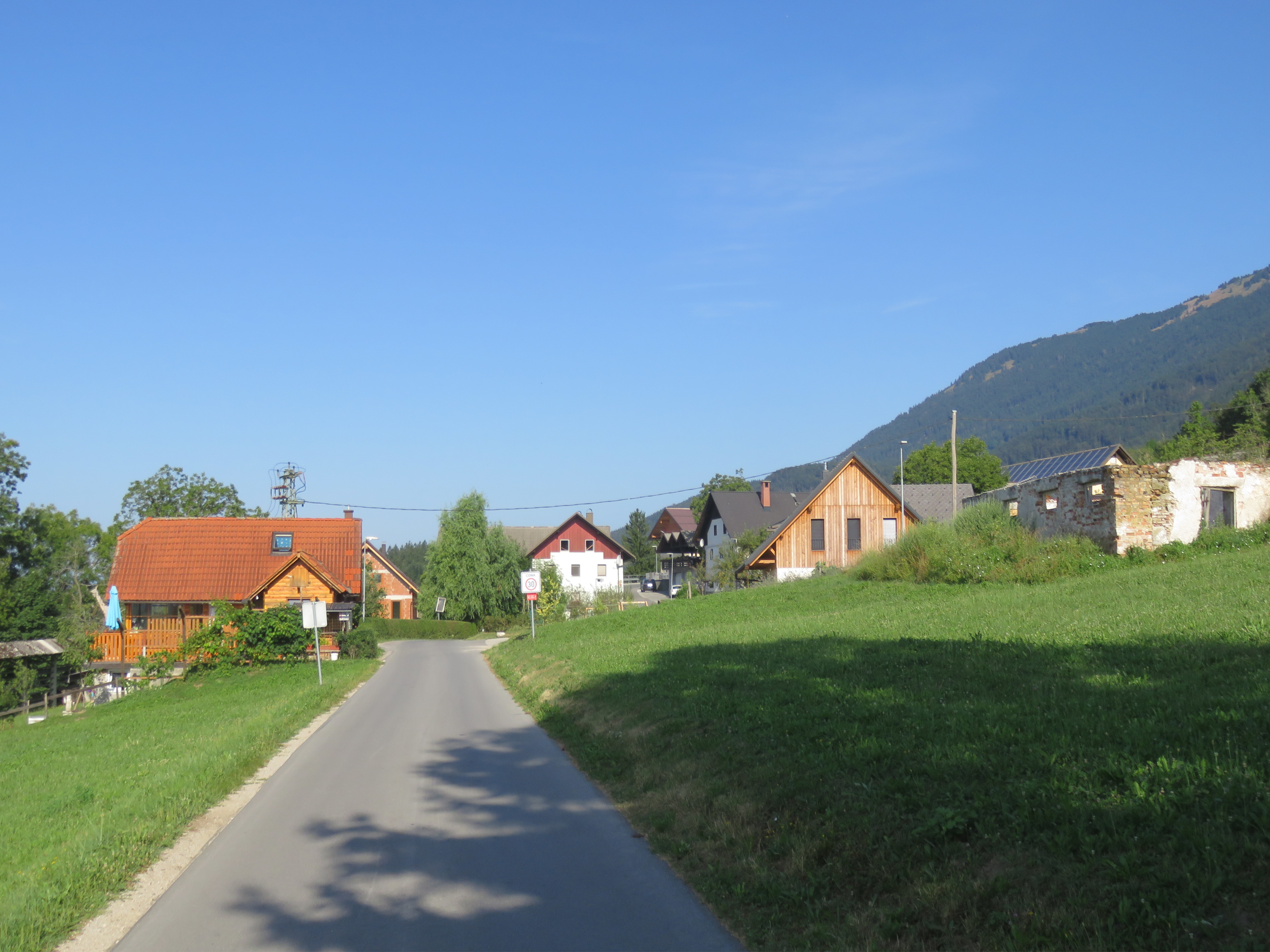

- Location in Slovenia
- Coordinates: 46°19′22.87″N 14°22′31.27″E
- Country: Slovenia
- Traditional region: Upper Carniola
- Statistical region: Upper Carniola
- Municipality: Kranj

Area
  - Total: 5.04 km^{2} (1.95 sq mi)
- Elevation: 613.9 m (2,014 ft)

Population (2002)
  - Total: 28

Povlje (pronounced [ˈpoːu̯ljɛ]) is a small village below Mount Storžič in the Municipality of Kranj in the Upper Carniola region of Slovenia.

== Gallery ==
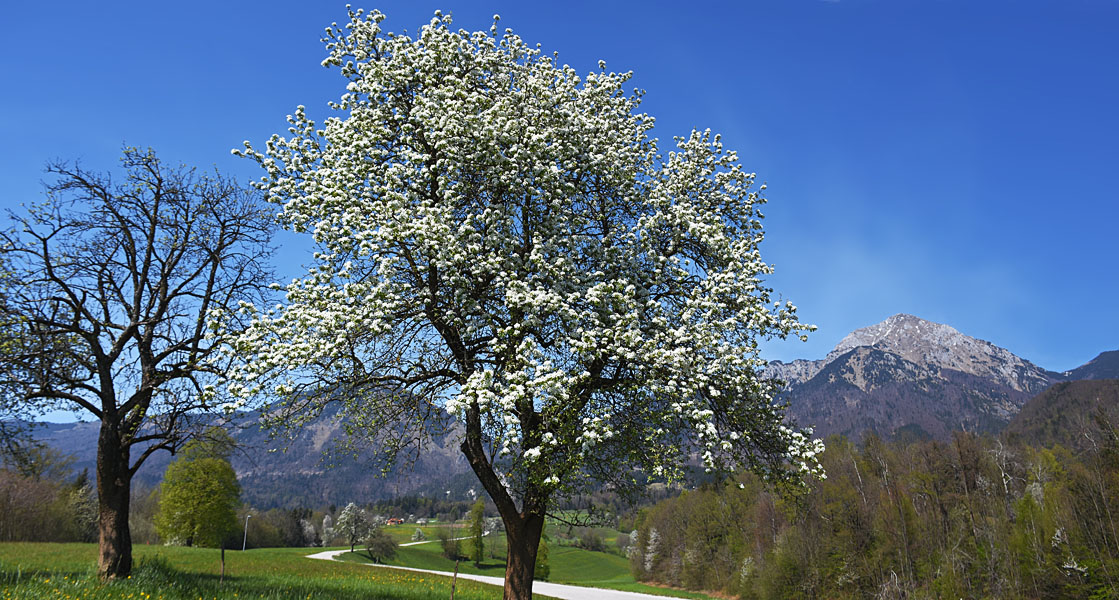
Spring in Povlje, Mount Storžič in the background
