= Tatinec =

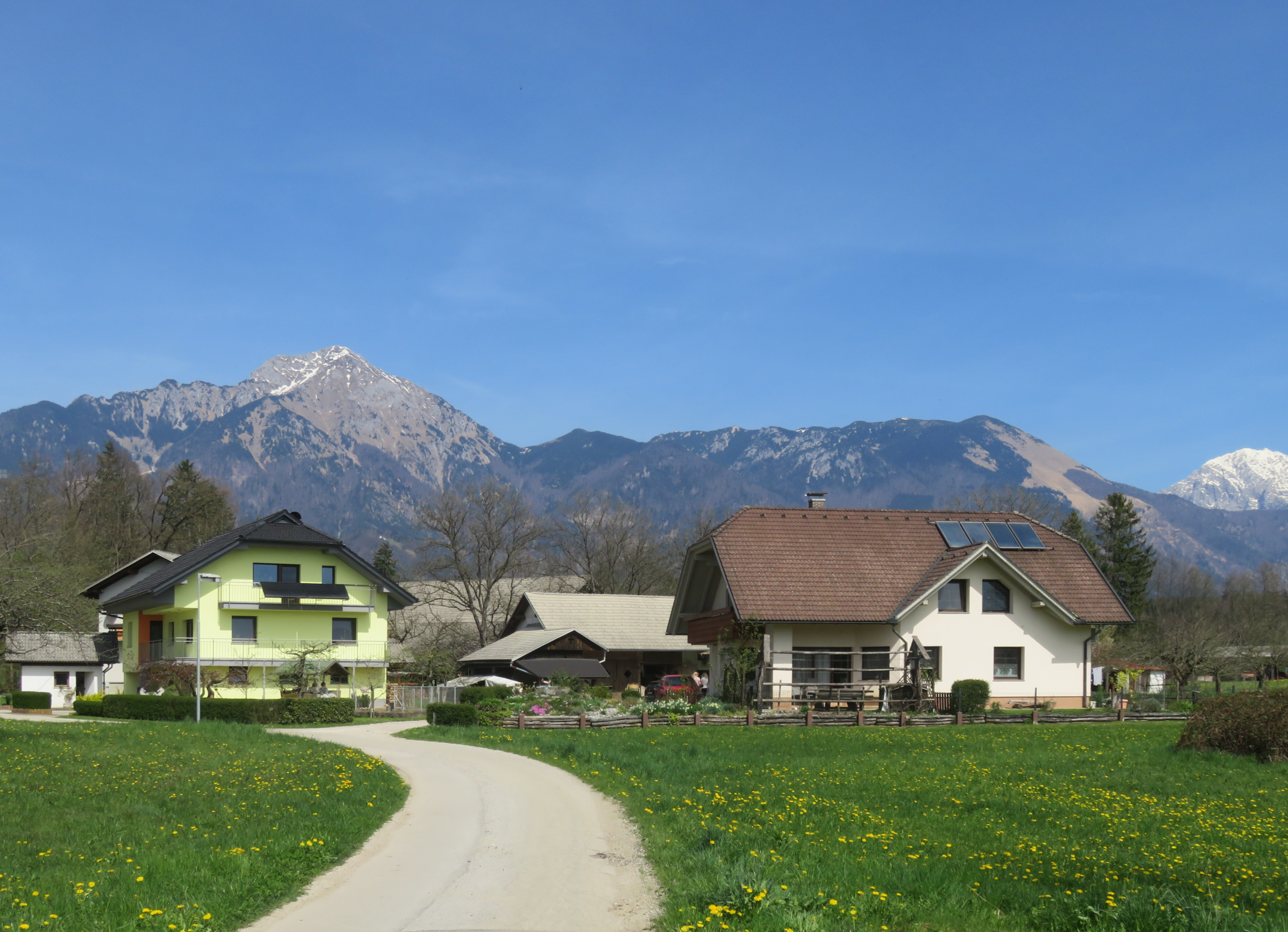

- Location in Slovenia
- Coordinates: 46°17′19.33″N 14°22′6.04″E
- Country: Slovenia
- Traditional region: Upper Carniola
- Statistical region: Upper Carniola
- Municipality: Kranj

Area
  - Total: 1.29 km^{2} (0.50 sq mi)
- Elevation: 423.2 m (1,388 ft)

Population (2002)
  - Total: 70

Tatinec (pronounced [taˈtiːnəts]) is a settlement north of Kranj in the Upper Carniola region of Slovenia.

== Name ==
Tatinec was attested in historical sources as Tateniç in 1309, Teteÿnicz in 1370, Tettinecz in 1452, and Tattynitsch in 1458, among other spellings.
