= Čepulje =

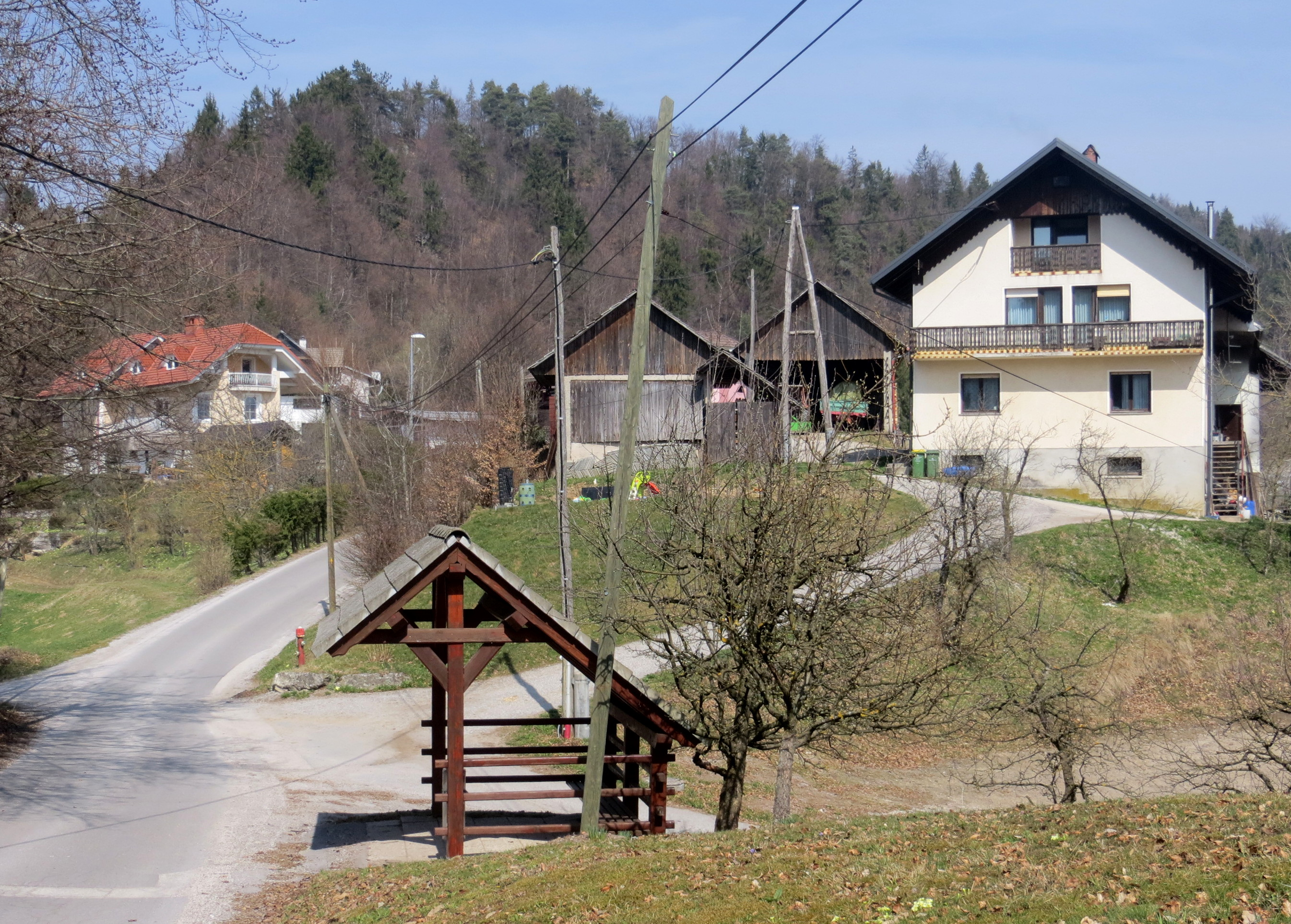

- Location in Slovenia
- Coordinates: 46°13′50.58″N 14°17′5.05″E
- Country: Slovenia
- Traditional region: Upper Carniola
- Statistical region: Upper Carniola
- Municipality: Kranj

Area
  - Total: 1.29 km^{2} (0.50 sq mi)
- Elevation: 677.3 m (2,222 ft)

Population (2002)
  - Total: 33

Čepulje (pronounced [tʃɛˈpuːljɛ]; German: Tschepule) is a small settlement in the Municipality of Kranj in the Upper Carniola region of Slovenia .
