= Podblica =

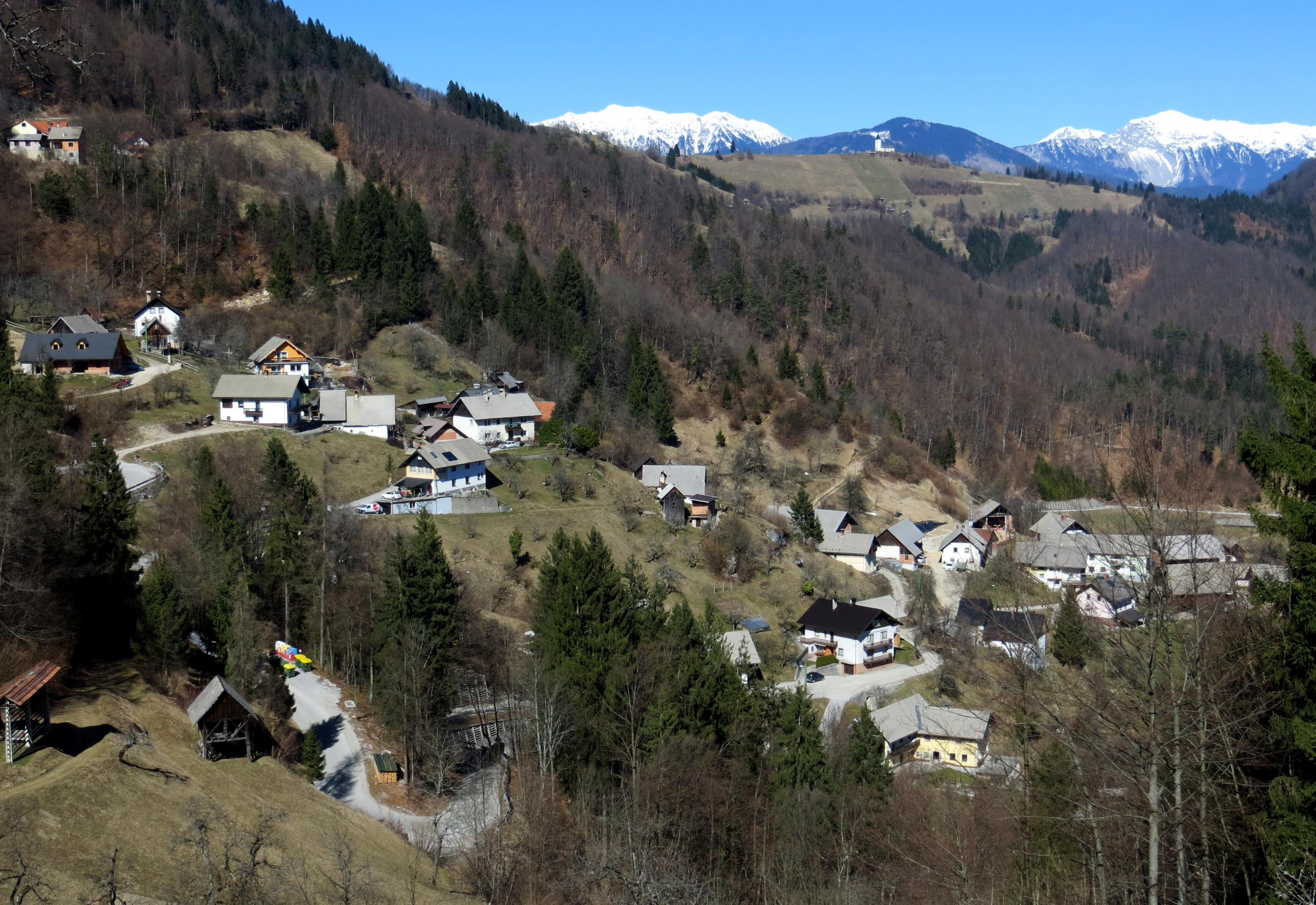

- Location in Slovenia
- Coordinates: 46°15′32.14″N 14°12′35.69″E
- Country: Slovenia
- Traditional region: Upper Carniola
- Statistical region: Upper Carniola
- Municipality: Kranj

Area
  - Total: 3.22 km^{2} (1.24 sq mi)
- Elevation: 631 m (2,070 ft)

Population (2002)
  - Total: 115

Podblica (pronounced [pɔdˈbliːtsa]) is a village in the hills west of Kranj in the Upper Carniola region of Slovenia.
