= Babni Vrt =

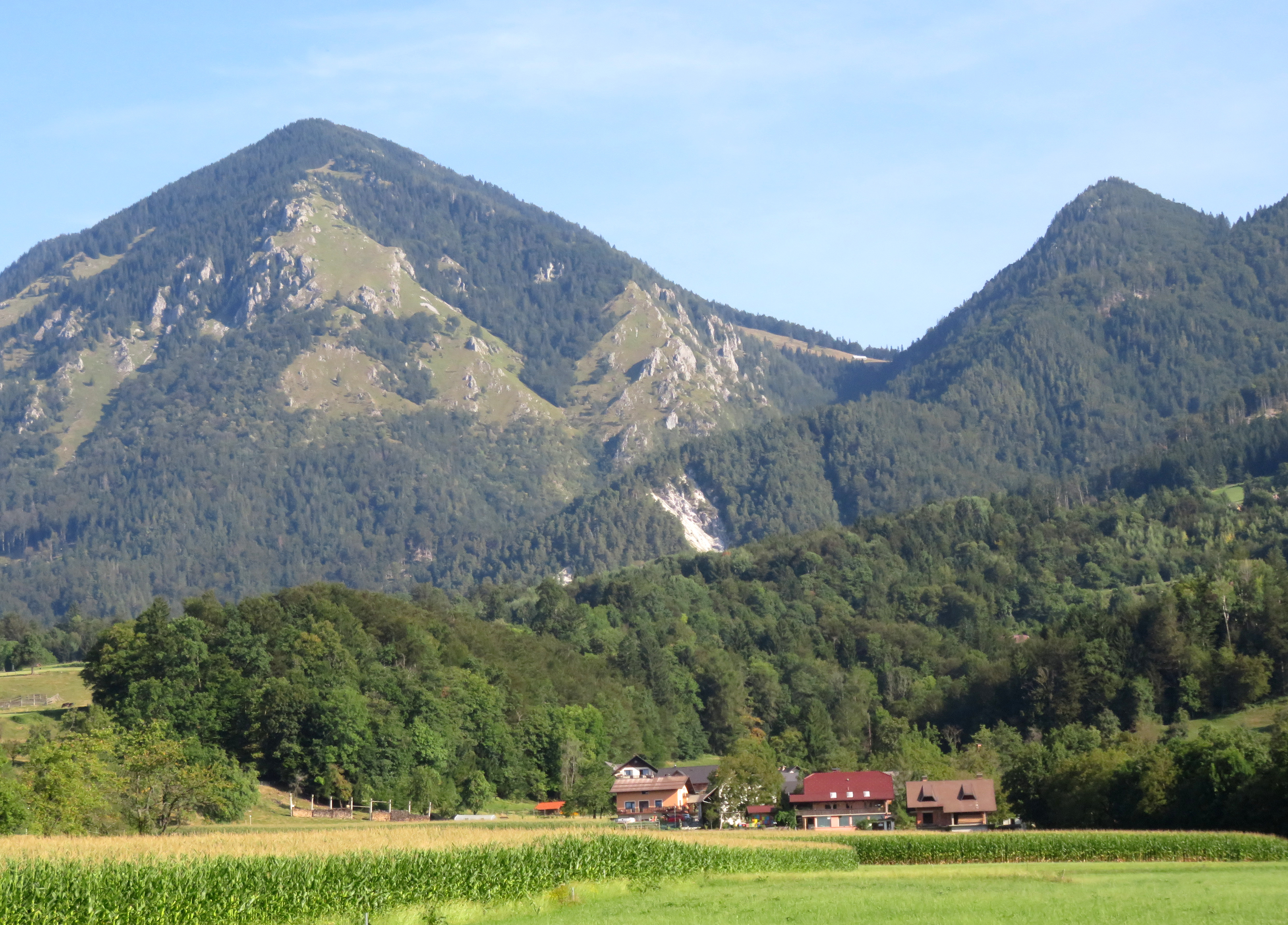

- Location in Slovenia
- Coordinates: 46°19′13.28″N 14°22′52.22″E
- Country: Slovenia
- Traditional region: Upper Carniola
- Statistical region: Upper Carniola
- Municipality: Kranj

Area
  - Total: 1.76 km^{2} (0.68 sq mi)
- Elevation: 539.9 m (1,771 ft)

Population (2002)
  - Total: 58

Babni Vrt (pronounced [ˈbaːbni ˈʋəɾt]; in older sources also Babin Vrt, German: Babendorf) is a small settlement in the Municipality of Kranj in the Upper Carniola region of Slovenia.

== Name ==
Babni Vrt was attested in historical sources as Babenwort between 1205 and 1208, Waben garten and Wabinwart in 1444, and Babeygartt in 1481, among other spellings.
