= Mlaka pri Kranju =

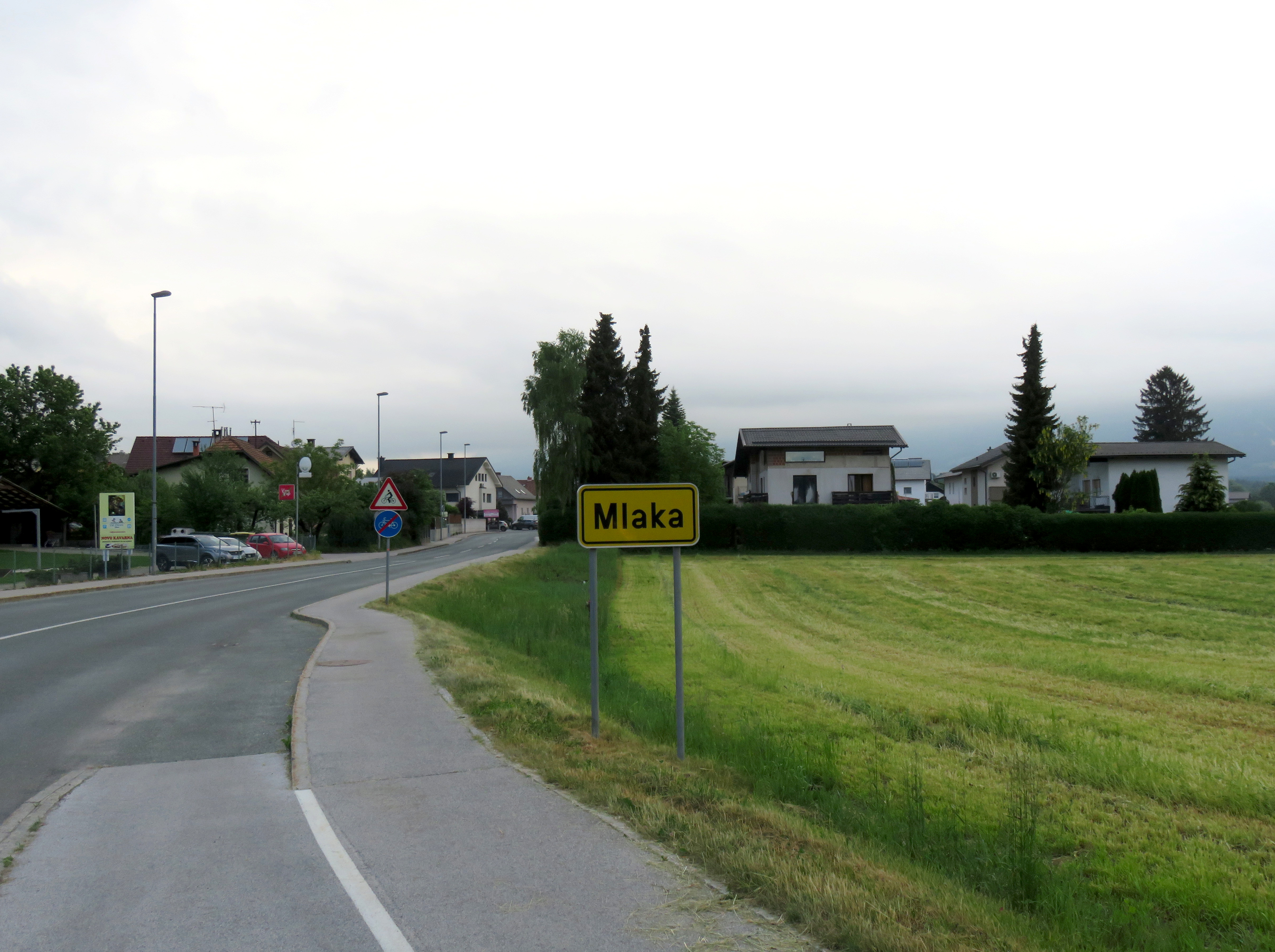

- Location in Slovenia
- Coordinates: 46°16′26.63″N 14°20′50.92″E
- Country: Slovenia
- Traditional region: Upper Carniola
- Statistical region: Upper Carniola
- Municipality: Kranj

Area
  - Total: 2.22 km^{2} (0.86 sq mi)
- Elevation: 416.1 m (1,365 ft)

Population (2002)
  - Total: 1,502

Mlaka pri Kranju (pronounced [ˈmlaːka pɾi ˈkɾaːnju]) is an urbanized settlement just north of Kranj in the Upper Carniola region of Slovenia.

== Name ==
The name of the settlement was changed from Mlaka to Mlaka pri Kranju in 1955.
