= Zabukovje, Kranj =

Zabukovje
- Location in Slovenia
- Coordinates: 46°14′42.38″N 14°18′47.09″E
- Country: Slovenia
- Traditional region: Upper Carniola
- Statistical region: Upper Carniola
- Municipality: Kranj

Area
  - Total: 1.13 km^{2} (0.44 sq mi)
- Elevation: 553 m (1,814 ft)

Population (2002)
  - Total: 83

Zabukovje (pronounced [zaˈbuːkɔu̯jɛ]) is a dispersed settlement below Sveti Jošt in the Municipality of Kranj in the Upper Carniola region of Slovenia.
