= Nemilje =

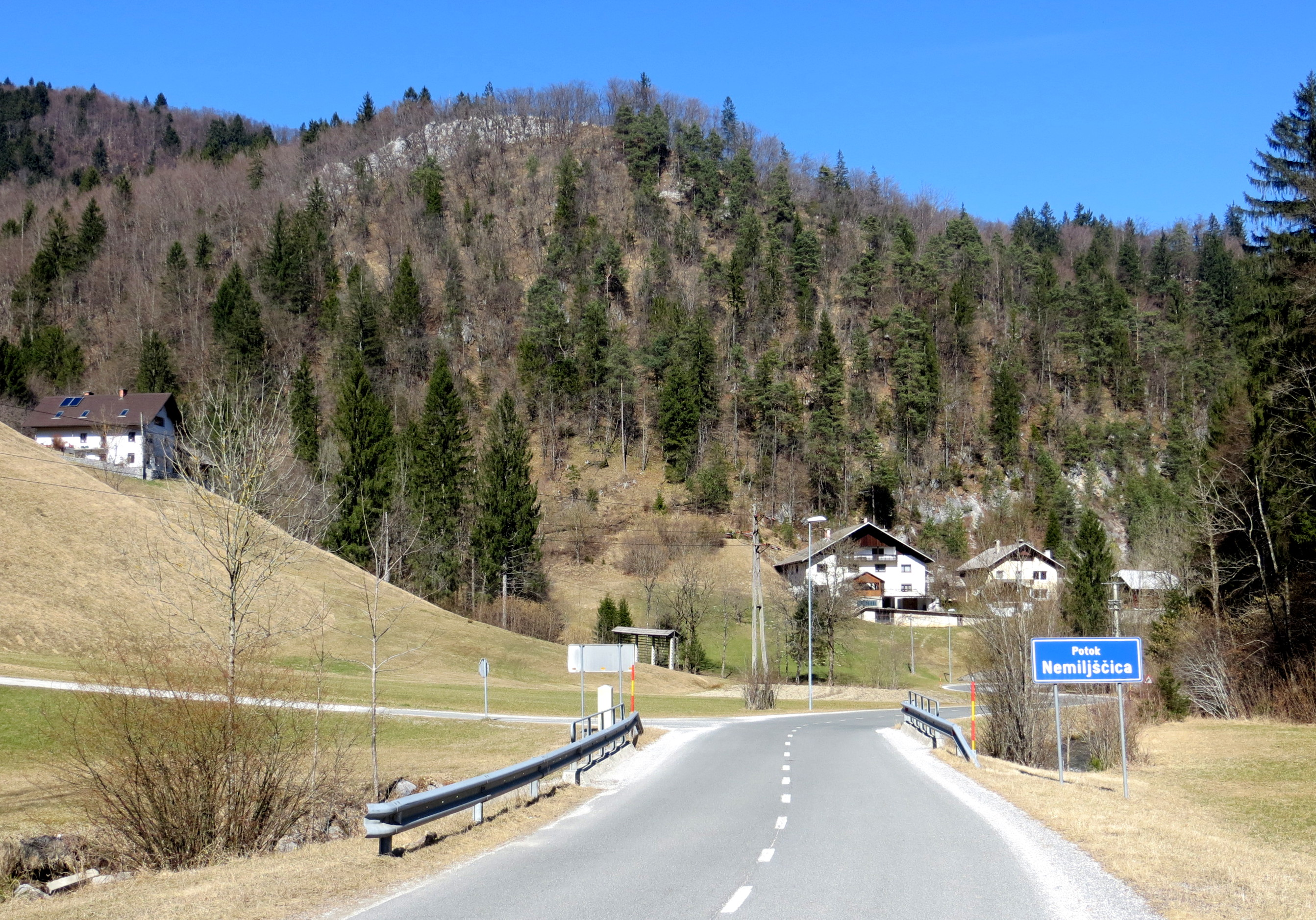

- Location in Slovenia
- Coordinates: 46°15′37.36″N 14°13′29.32″E
- Country: Slovenia
- Traditional region: Upper Carniola
- Statistical region: Upper Carniola
- Municipality: Kranj

Area
  - Total: 2.93 km^{2} (1.13 sq mi)
- Elevation: 504 m (1,654 ft)

Population (2002)
  - Total: 76

Nemilje (pronounced [nɛˈmiːljɛ]; German: Nemile) is a dispersed settlement in the hills west of Kranj in the Upper Carniola region of Slovenia .
