= Njivica =

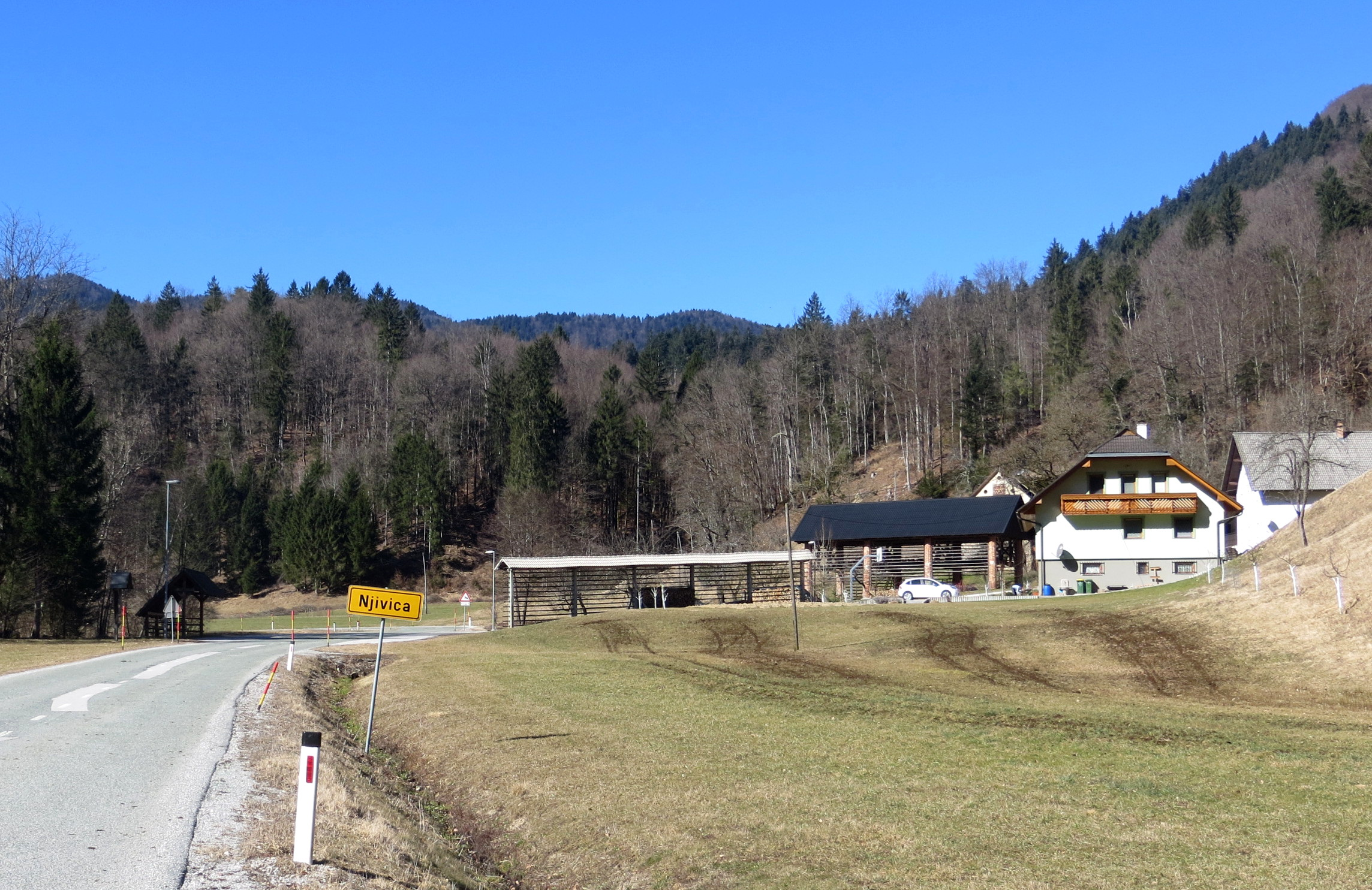

- Location in Slovenia
- Coordinates: 46°16′7.25″N 14°14′31.02″E
- Country: Slovenia
- Traditional region: Upper Carniola
- Statistical region: Upper Carniola
- Municipality: Kranj

Area
  - Total: 0.87 km^{2} (0.34 sq mi)
- Elevation: 514.8 m (1,689 ft)

Njivica (pronounced [ˈnjiːʋitsa]) is a small settlement in the Municipality of Kranj in the Upper Carniola region of Slovenia .
