= Meja, Kranj =

Meja
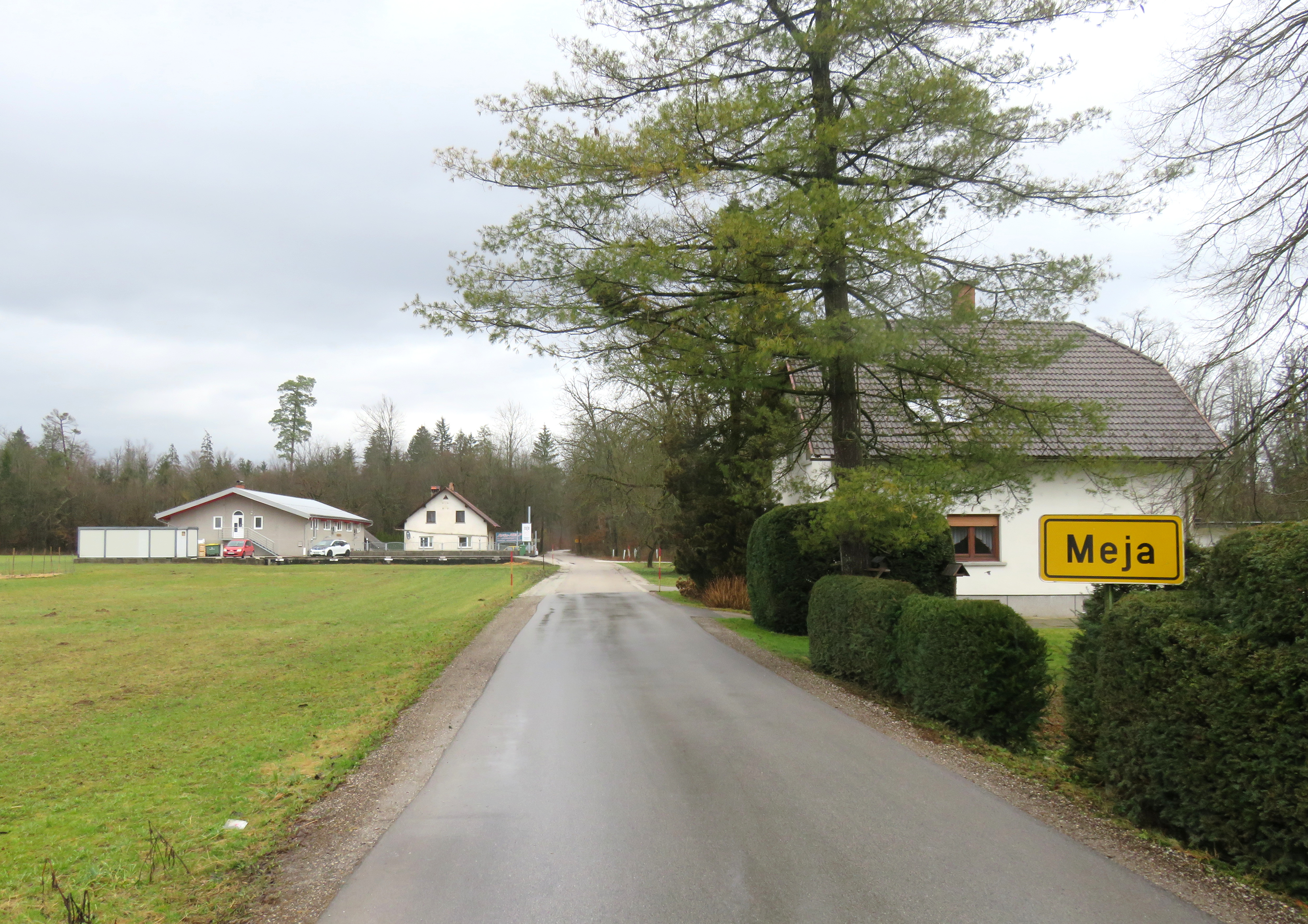

- Location in Slovenia
- Coordinates: 46°11′28.7″N 14°22′35.23″E
- Country: Slovenia
- Traditional region: Upper Carniola
- Statistical region: Upper Carniola
- Municipality: Kranj

Area
  - Total: 2.73 km^{2} (1.05 sq mi)
- Elevation: 365.3 m (1,198 ft)

Population (2002)
  - Total: 13

Meja (pronounced [ˈmɛːja]) is a small settlement near Mavčiče in the Municipality of Kranj in the Upper Carniola region of Slovenia.

== Name ==
The name Meja means 'border'. The name refers to the location of the village along the road from Jeprca to Kranj, which largely corresponded to the western border of the Dominion of Škofja Loka from 973 to 1803.
