= Srakovlje =

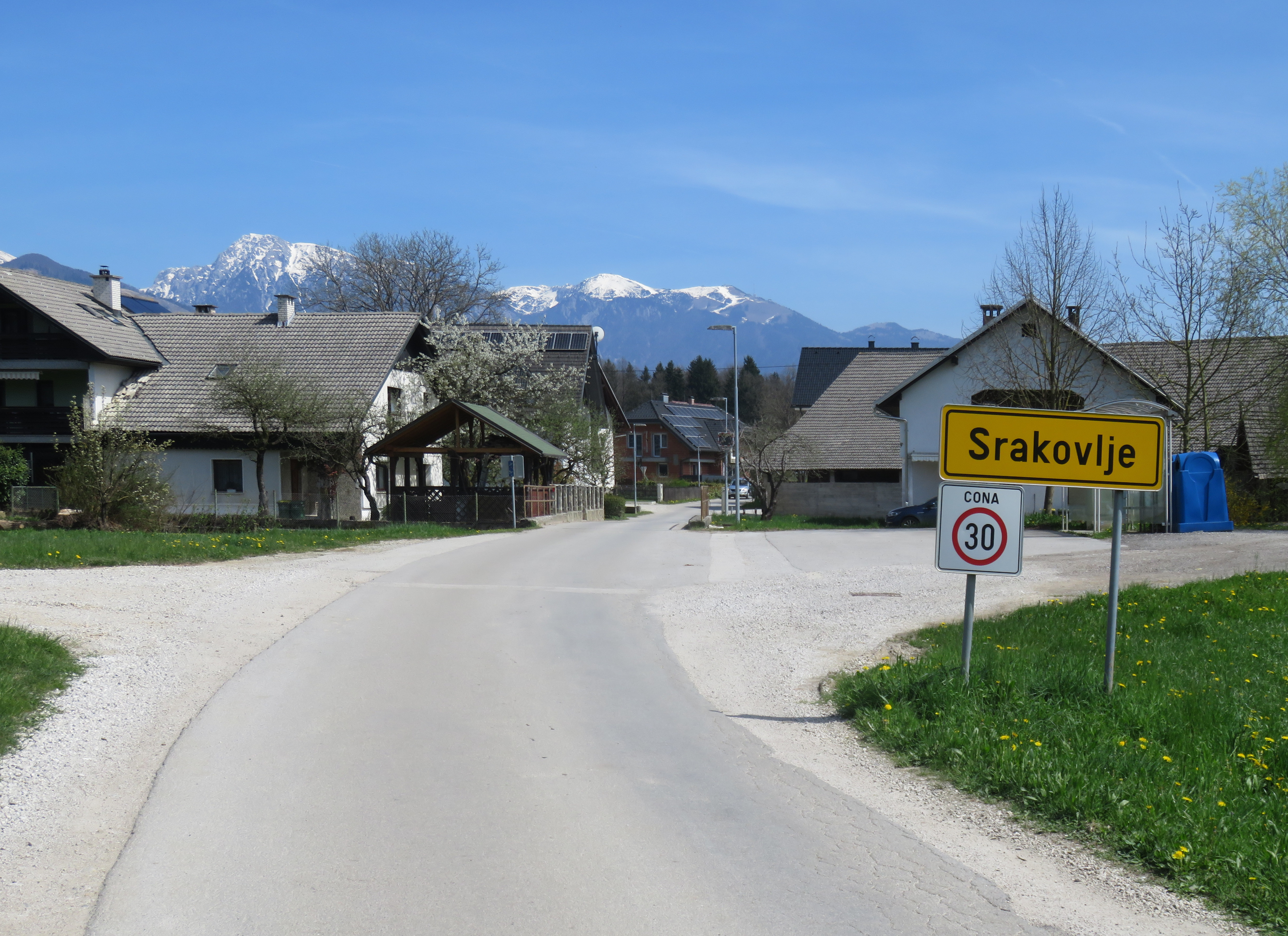

- Location in Slovenia
- Coordinates: 46°16′51.02″N 14°21′42.54″E
- Country: Slovenia
- Traditional region: Upper Carniola
- Statistical region: Upper Carniola
- Municipality: Kranj

Area
  - Total: 2.67 km^{2} (1.03 sq mi)
- Elevation: 412.2 m (1,352 ft)

Population (2002)
  - Total: 88

Srakovlje (pronounced [ˈsɾaːkɔu̯ljɛ]) is a dispersed settlement north of Kranj in the Upper Carniola region of Slovenia.
