= Breg ob Savi =

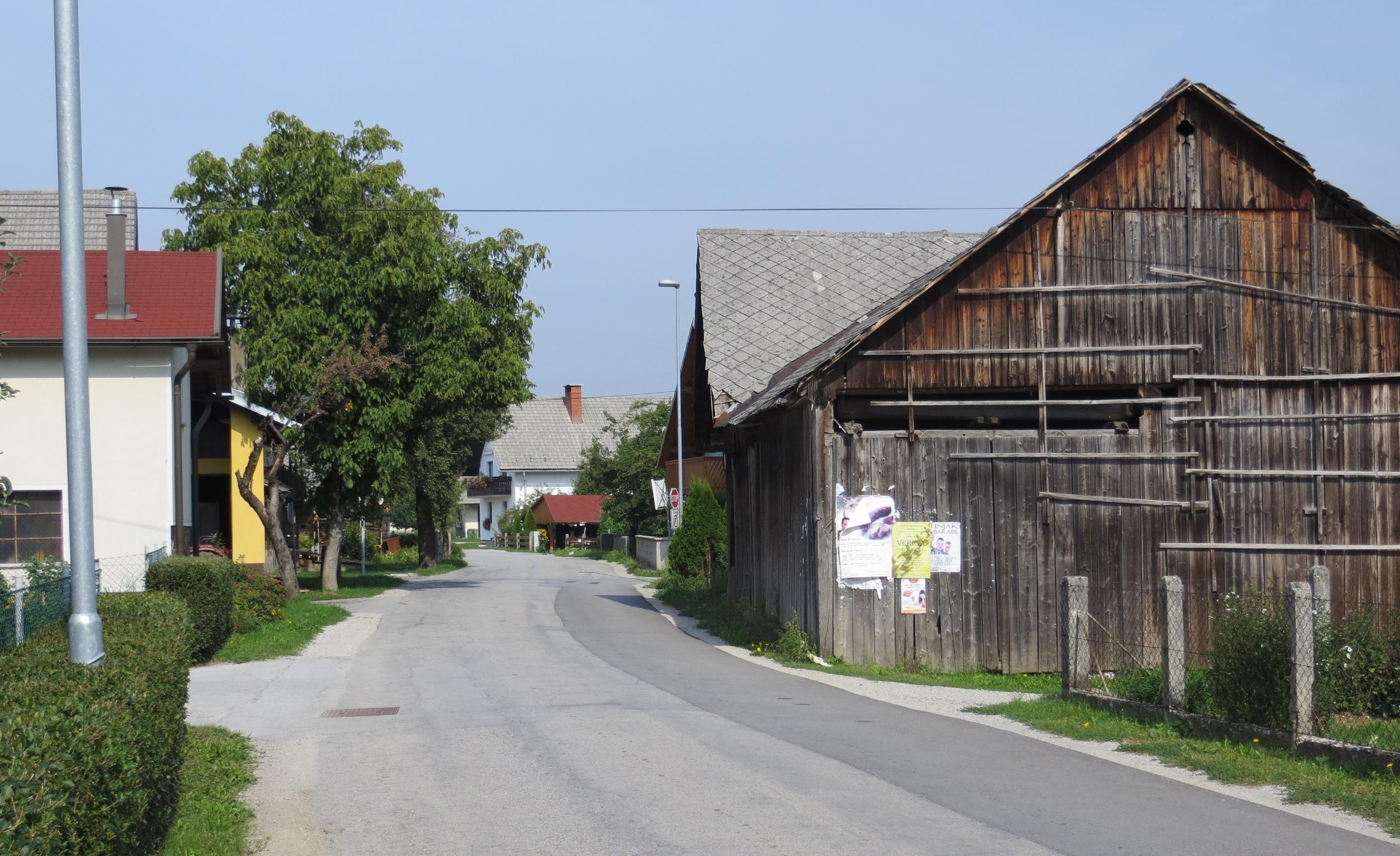

- Location in Slovenia
- Coordinates: 46°12′35.96″N 14°23′15.53″E
- Country: Slovenia
- Traditional region: Upper Carniola
- Statistical region: Upper Carniola
- Municipality: Kranj

Area
  - Total: 2.48 km^{2} (0.96 sq mi)
- Elevation: 364.8 m (1,197 ft)

Population (2002)
  - Total: 412

Breg ob Savi (pronounced [ˈbɾeːk ɔp ˈsaːʋi]) is a village on the right bank of the Sava River, just south of Kranj in the Upper Carniola region of Slovenia.

== Name ==
Breg ob Savi was attested in historical sources as Rayn in 1464 and Rain in 1476. The name of the settlement was changed from Breg to Breg ob Savi in 1953.

== Church ==
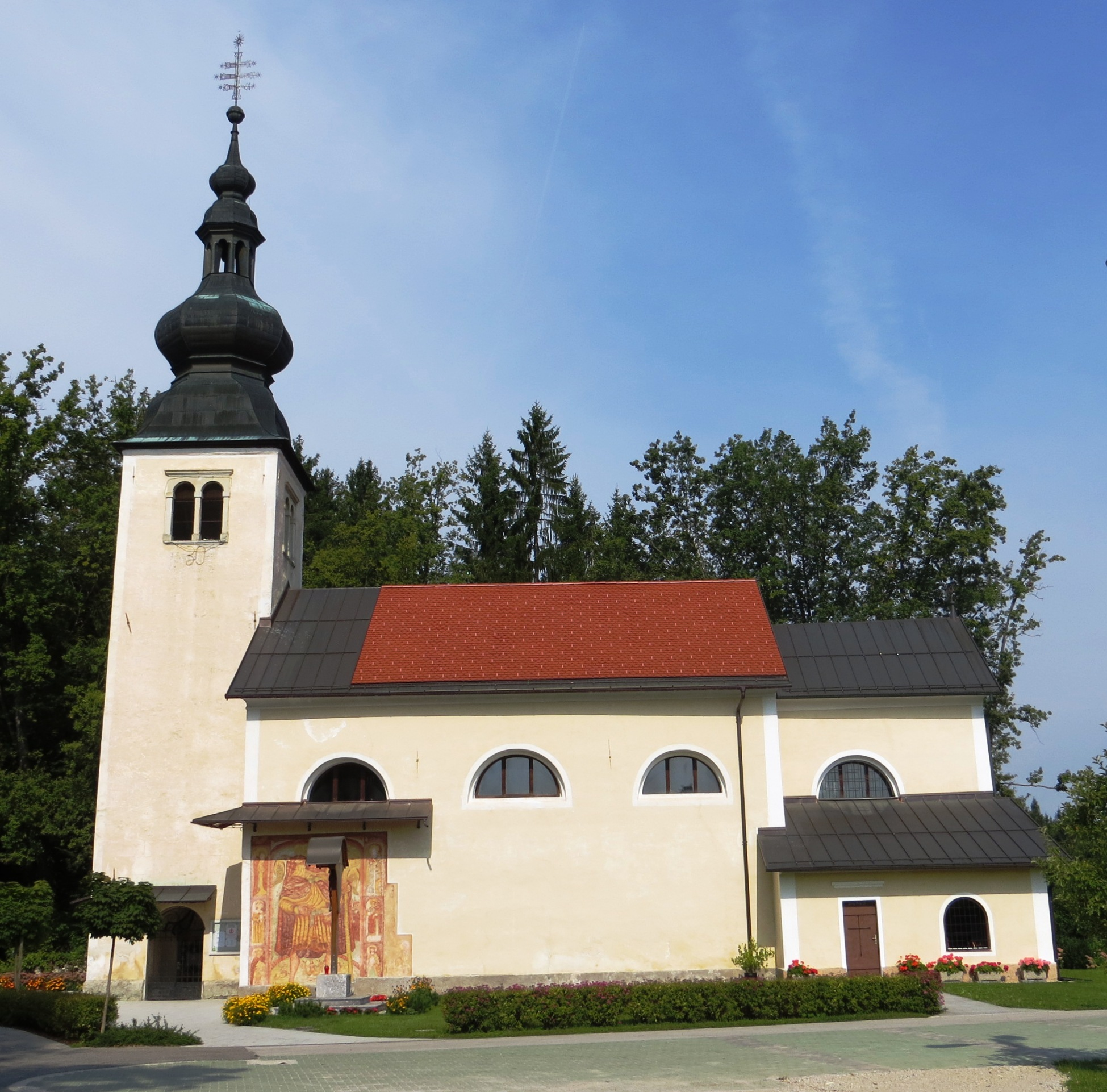
View from south

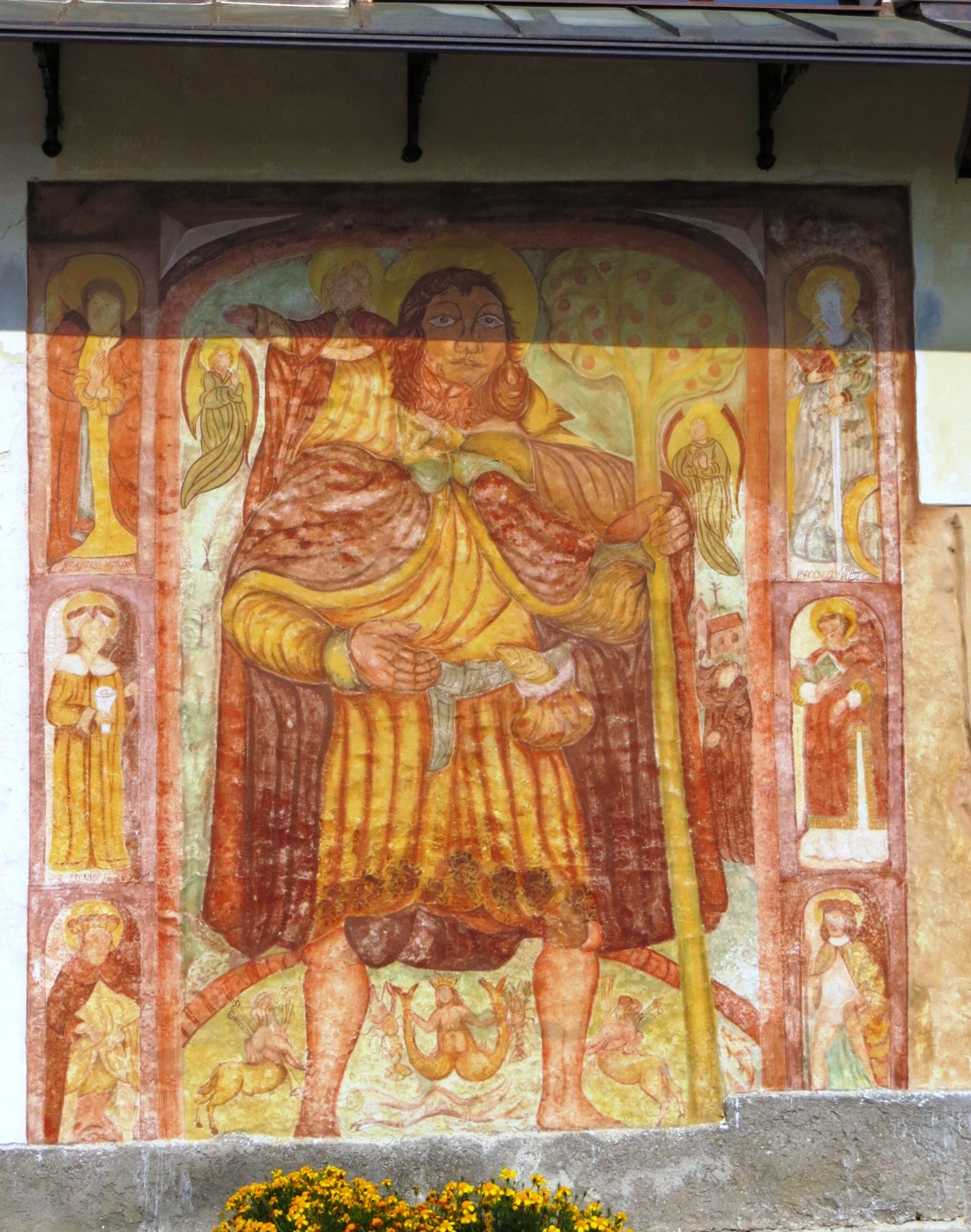
Fresco of Saint Christopher by Jernej of Loka (1525–30)

Mother of God Church

The church in the settlement is dedicated to the Mother of God. It is the parish church of the Parish of Kranj–Drulovka / Breg.
