= Hrastje, Kranj =

Hrastje
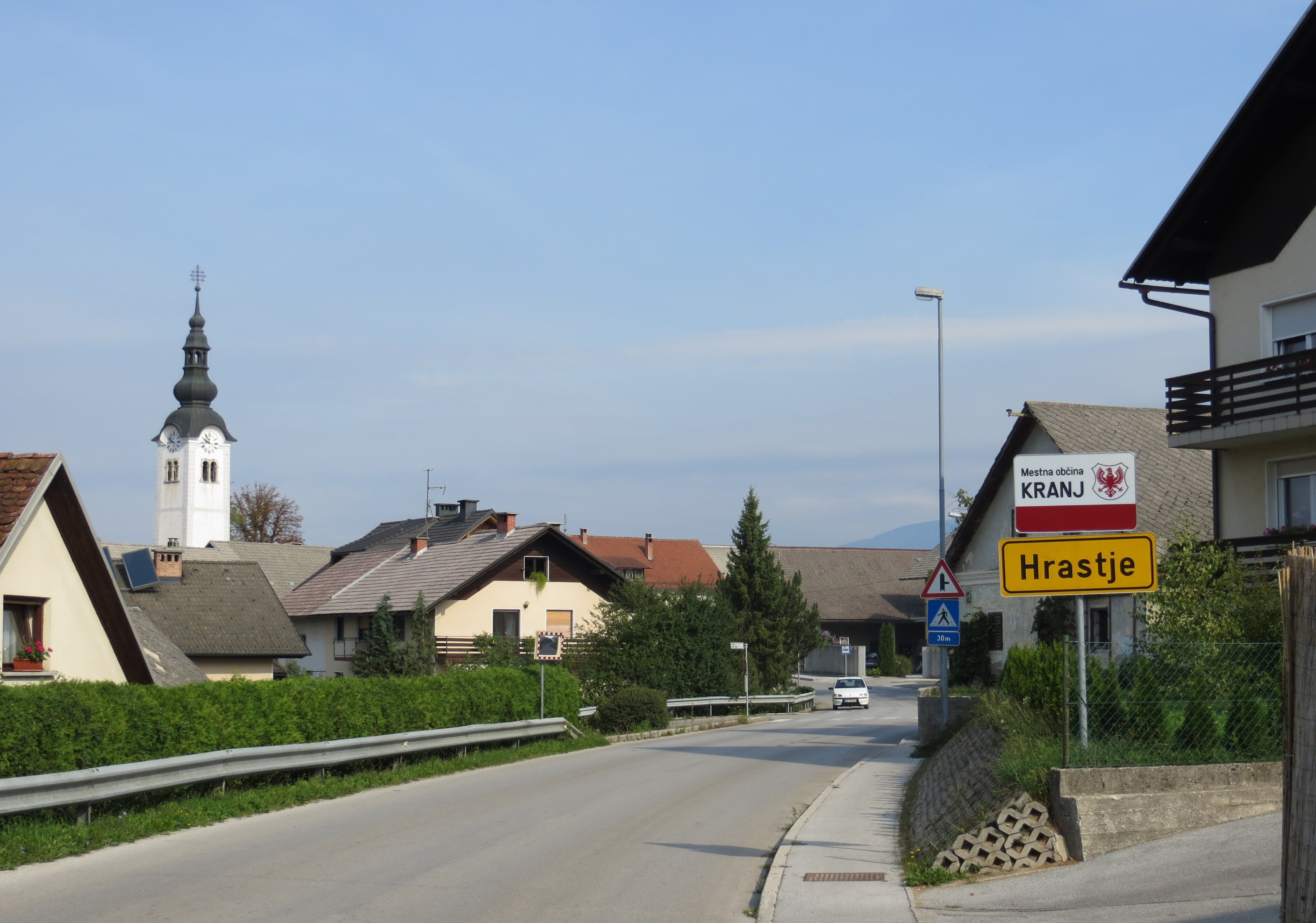

- Location in Slovenia
- Coordinates: 46°13′25.85″N 14°22′53.14″E
- Country: Slovenia
- Traditional region: Upper Carniola
- Statistical region: Upper Carniola
- Municipality: Kranj

Area
  - Land: 2.92 km^{2} (1.13 sq mi)
- Elevation: 374.6 m (1,229 ft)

Population (2002)
  - Total: 1,040

Hrastje (pronounced [ˈxɾaːstjɛ]; German: Hrastie) is a village on the left bank of the Sava River just south of Kranj in the Upper Carniola region of Slovenia.

== Name ==
The name Hrastje is derived from the Slovene common noun hrast 'oak', referring to the local vegetation. The settlement was known as Hrastie in German in the past.

== Church ==
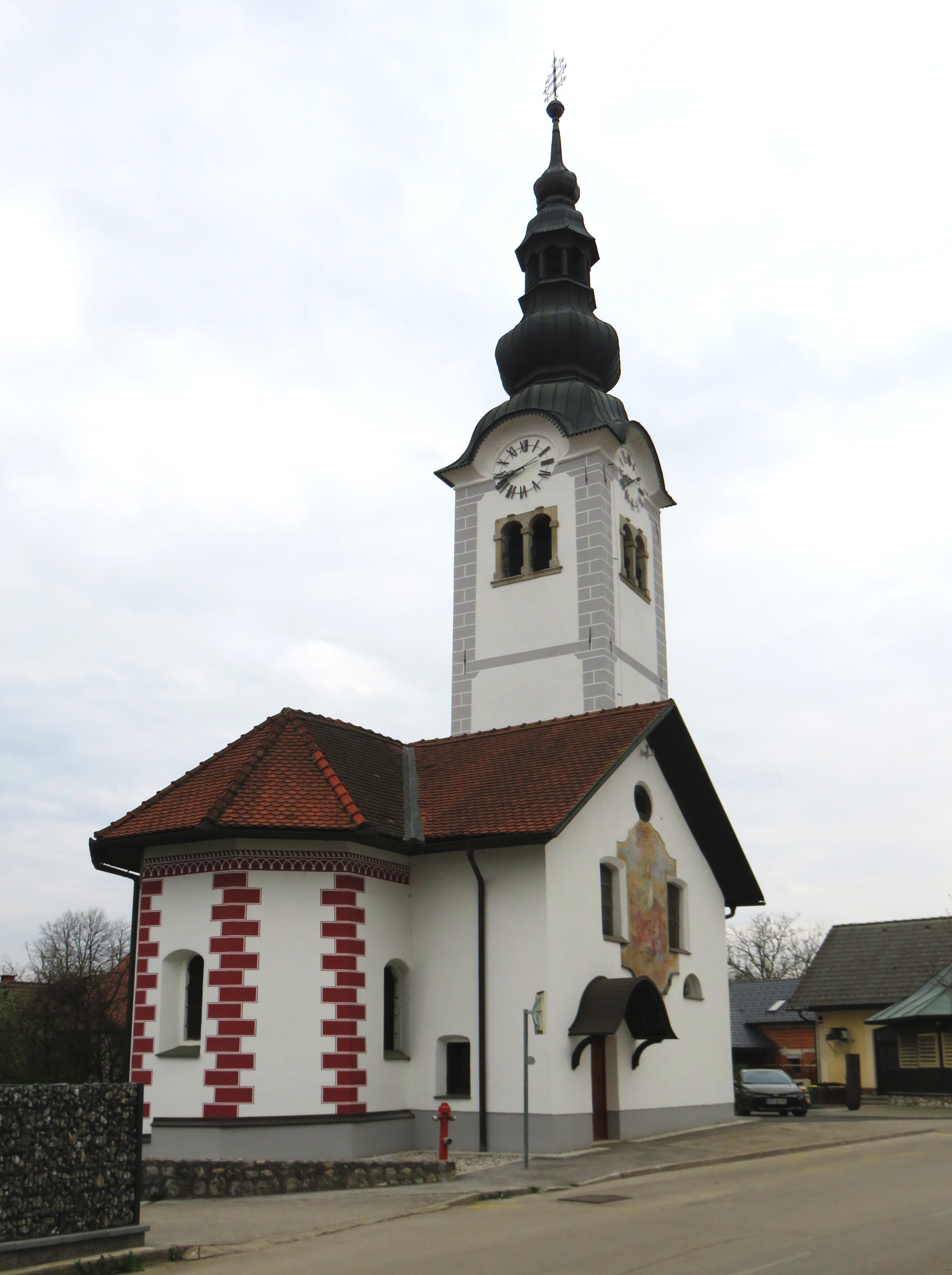
Saint Matthew's Church

The local church is dedicated to Saint Matthew. It was built in 1508 in a Gothic style and altered in the 17th century. Its greatest treasure is a 17th-century gilded wooden altar. The belfry was built in 1723.
