= Suha pri Predosljah =

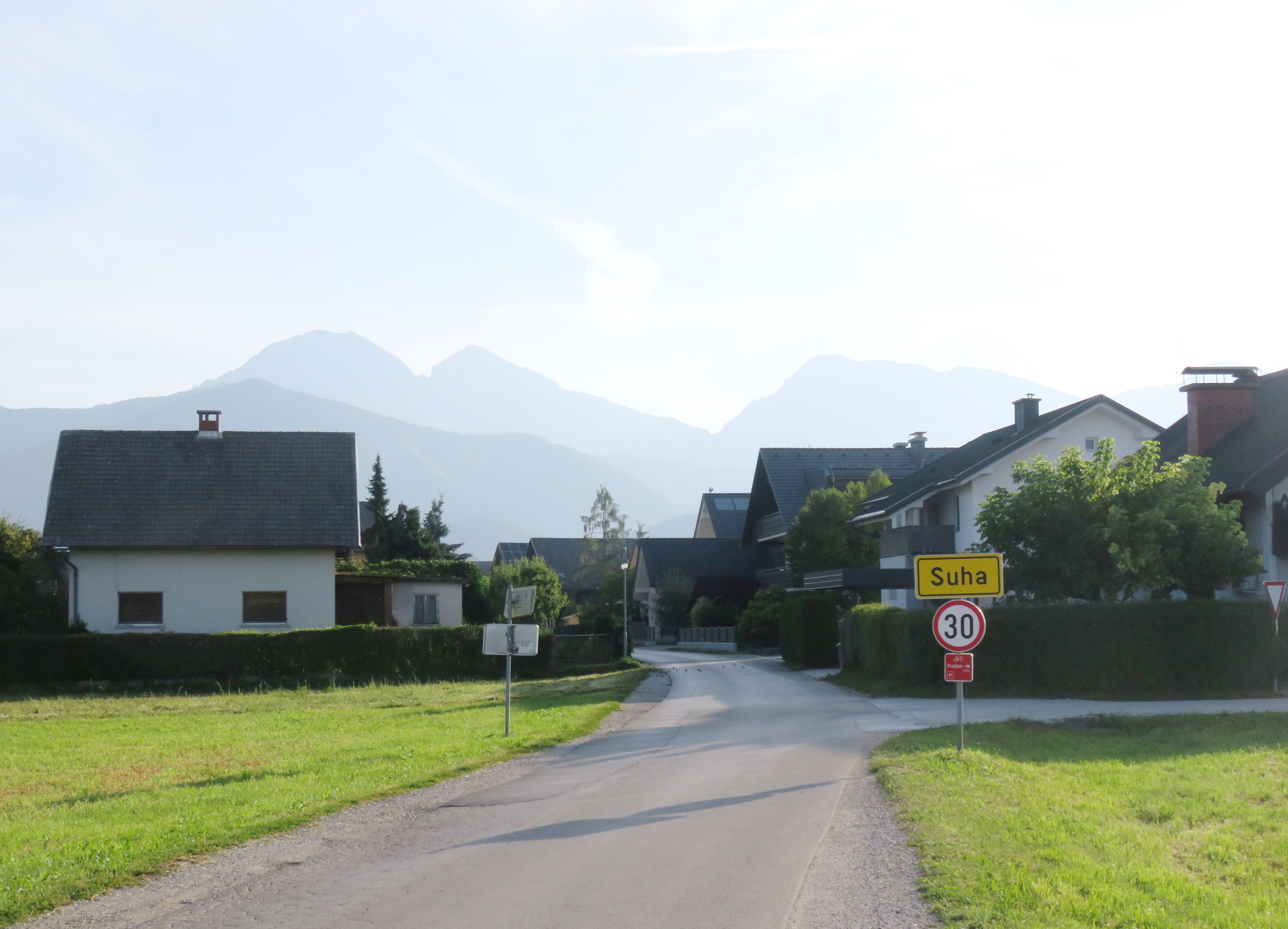

- Location in Slovenia
- Coordinates: 46°16′20.64″N 14°23′56.48″E
- Country: Slovenia
- Traditional region: Upper Carniola
- Statistical region: Upper Carniola
- Municipality: Kranj

Area
  - Total: 3.72 km^{2} (1.44 sq mi)
- Elevation: 430.2 m (1,411 ft)

Population (2002)
  - Total: 229

Suha pri Predosljah (pronounced [ˈsuːxa pɾi ˈpɾeːdɔsljax]; German: Sucha) is a village north of Kranj in the Upper Carniola region of Slovenia.

== Name ==
The name of the settlement was changed from Suha to Suha pri Predosljah in 1953. In the past the German name was Sucha.

== Church ==
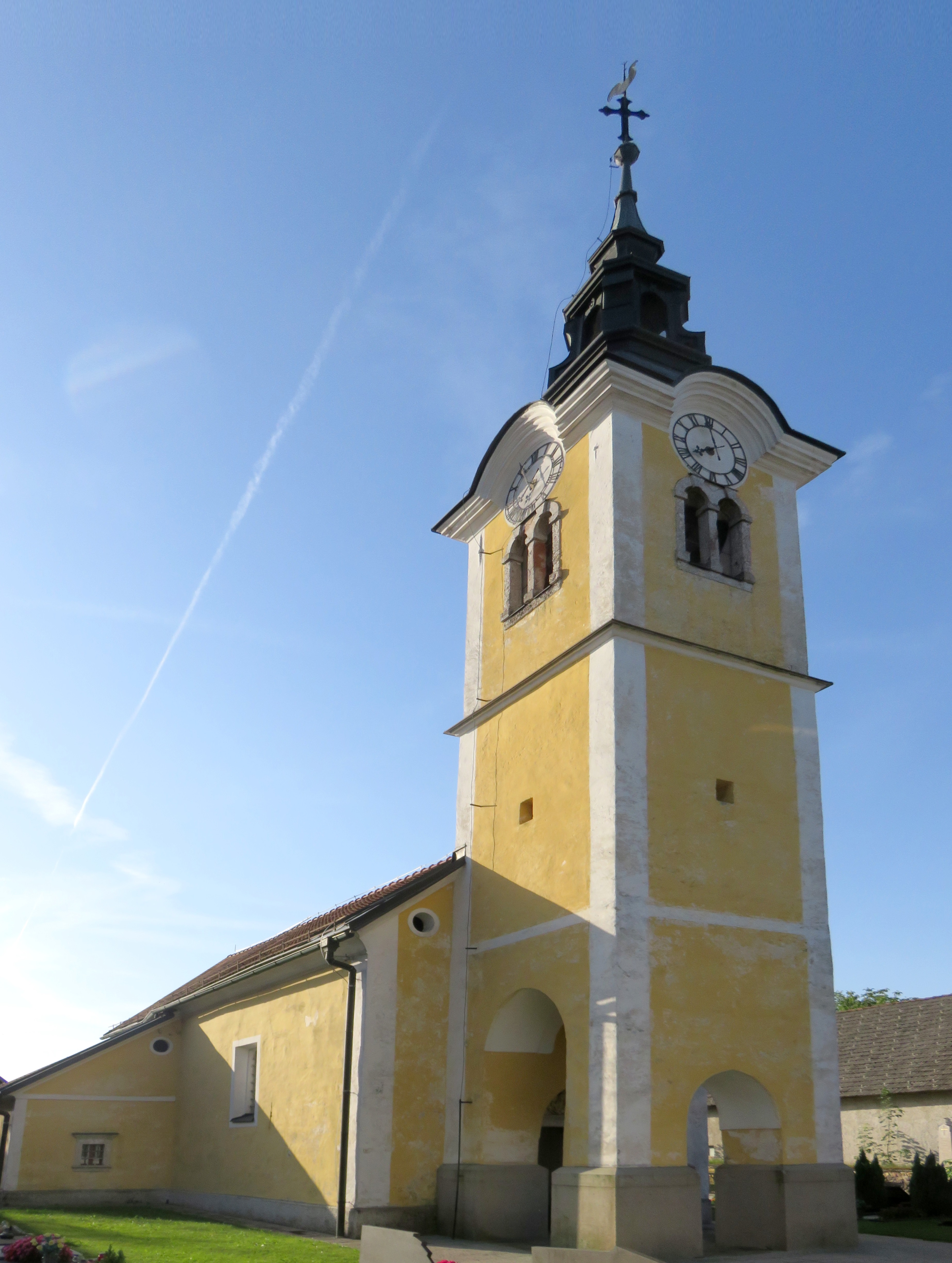
Saint Stephen's Church

The local church is dedicated to Saint Stephen.
