= Pangršica =

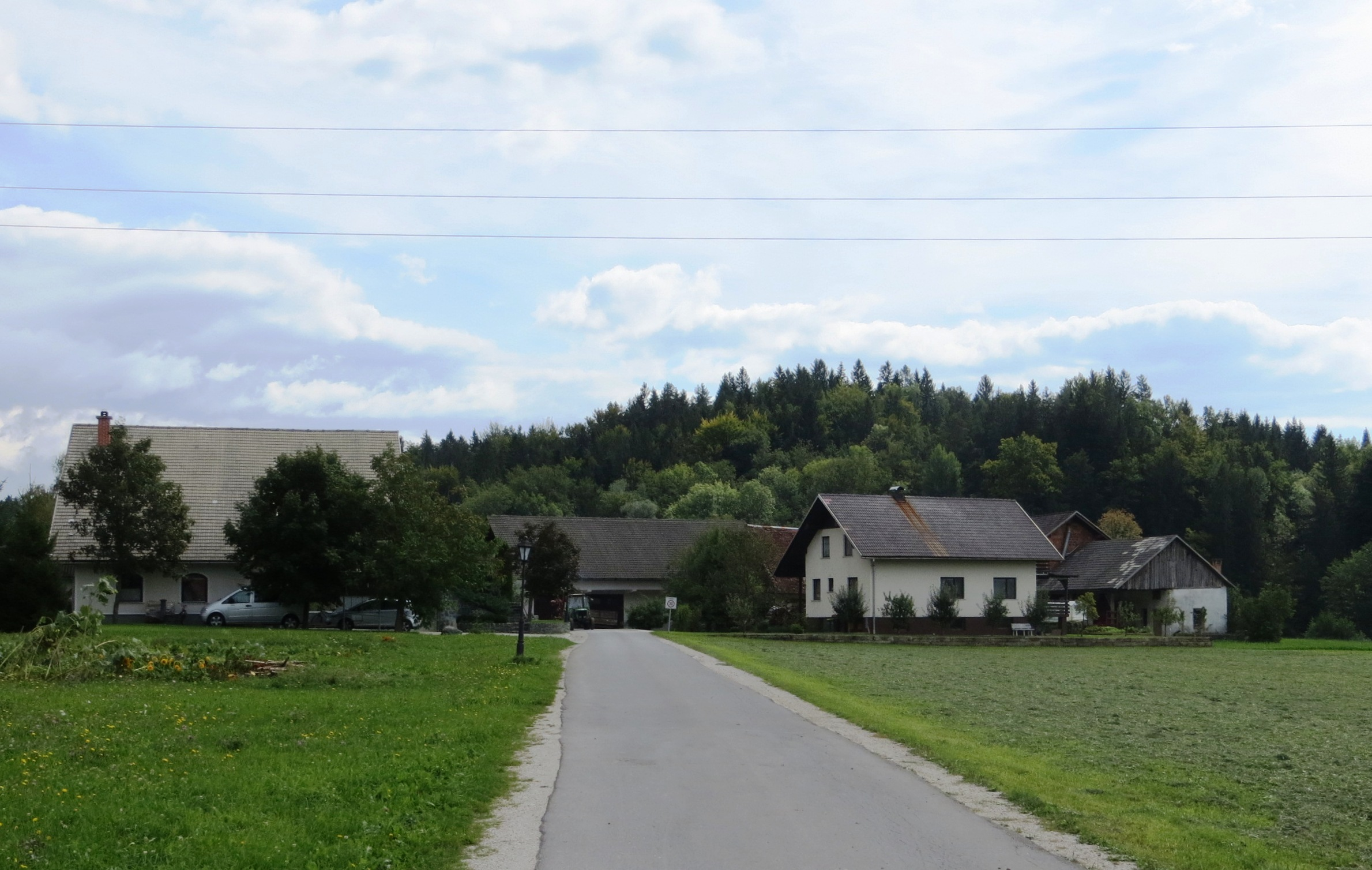

- Location in Slovenia
- Coordinates: 46°18′36.28″N 14°21′40.85″E
- Country: Slovenia
- Traditional region: Upper Carniola
- Statistical region: Upper Carniola
- Municipality: Kranj

Area
  - Total: 1.07 km^{2} (0.41 sq mi)
- Elevation: 463.2 m (1,520 ft)

Population (2002)
  - Total: 61

Pangršica (pronounced [ˈpaːŋɡəɾʃitsa]; German: Pangerschitz) is a small dispersed settlement north of Kranj in the Upper Carniola region of Slovenia .
