= Javornik, Kranj =

Javornik
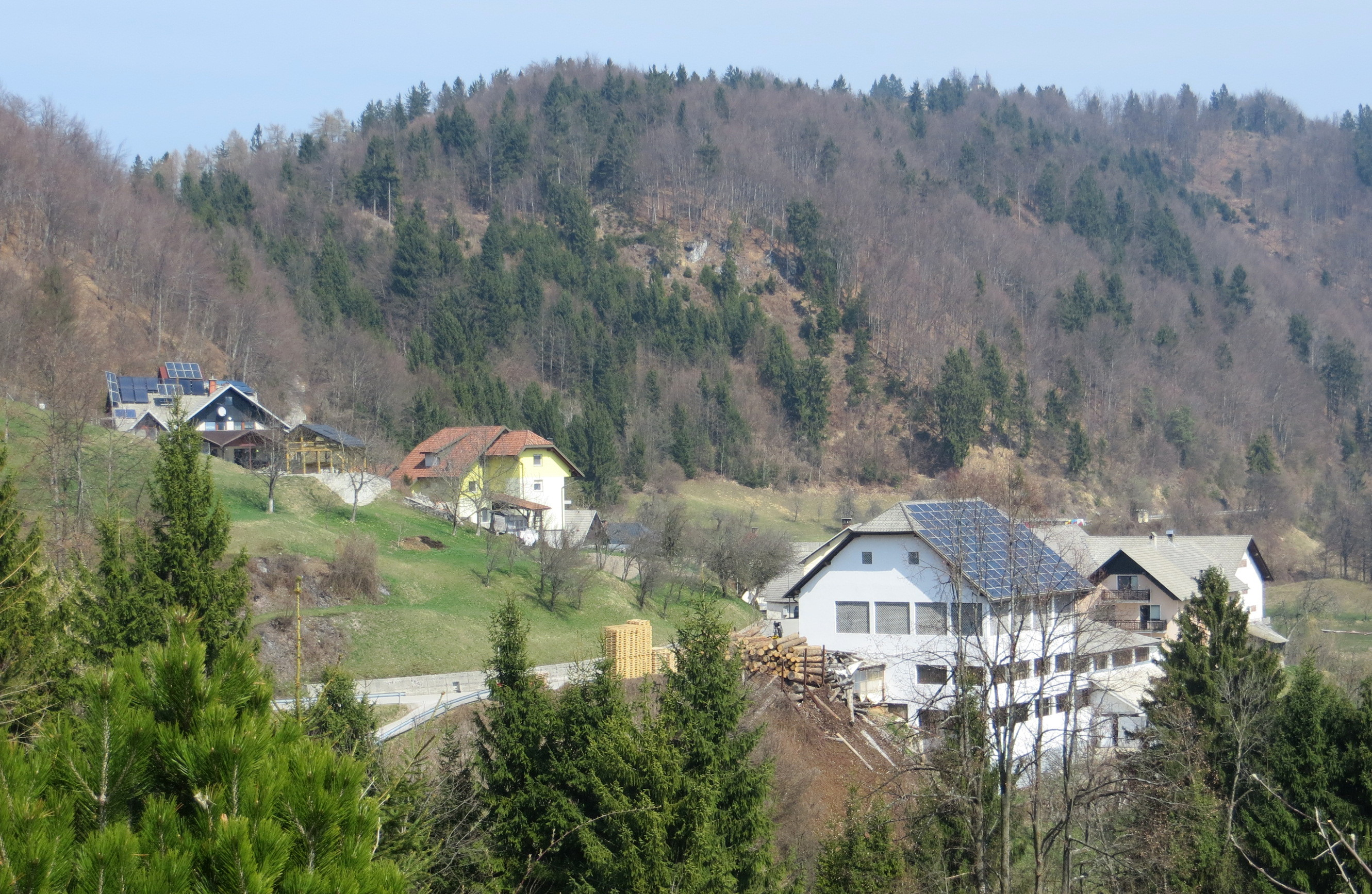

- Location in Slovenia
- Coordinates: 46°14′8.28″N 14°17′37.96″E
- Country: Slovenia
- Traditional region: Upper Carniola
- Statistical region: Upper Carniola
- Municipality: Kranj

Area
  - Total: 1.37 km^{2} (0.53 sq mi)
- Elevation: 653.6 m (2,144 ft)

Population (2002)
  - Total: 53

Javornik (pronounced [ˈjaːʋɔɾnik]) is a dispersed settlement near Sveti Jošt nad Kranjem in the Municipality of Kranj in the Upper Carniola region of Slovenia.
