= Pševo =

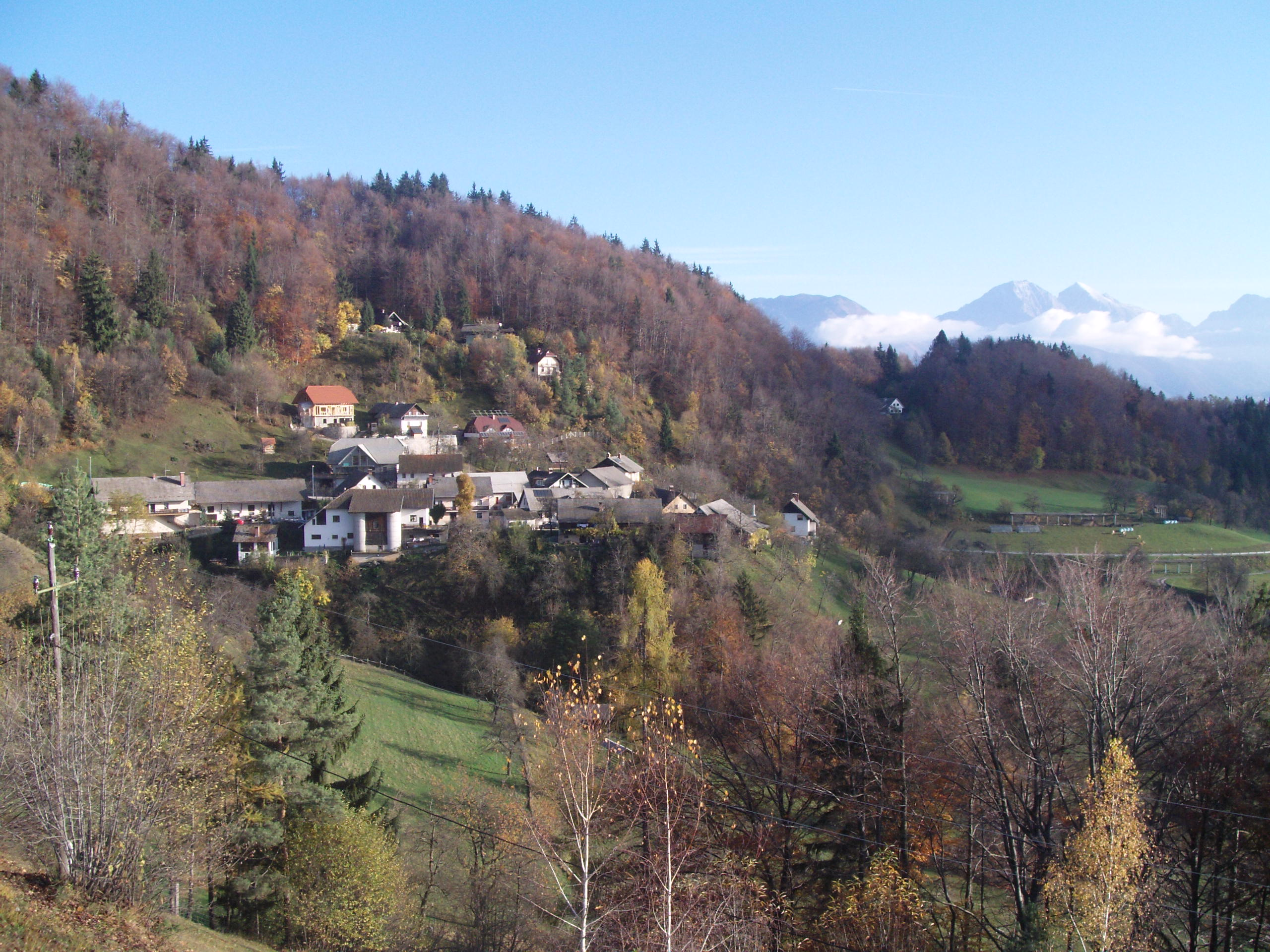

- Location in Slovenia
- Coordinates: 46°14′23.49″N 14°18′28.65″E
- Country: Slovenia
- Traditional region: Upper Carniola
- Statistical region: Upper Carniola
- Municipality: Kranj

Area
  - Total: 1.13 km^{2} (0.44 sq mi)
- Elevation: 603 m (1,978 ft)

Population (2002)
  - Total: 61

Pševo (pronounced [ˈpʃeːʋɔ]) is a small village in the hills west of Kranj in the Upper Carniola region of Slovenia.
