= Rakovica, Kranj =

Rakovica
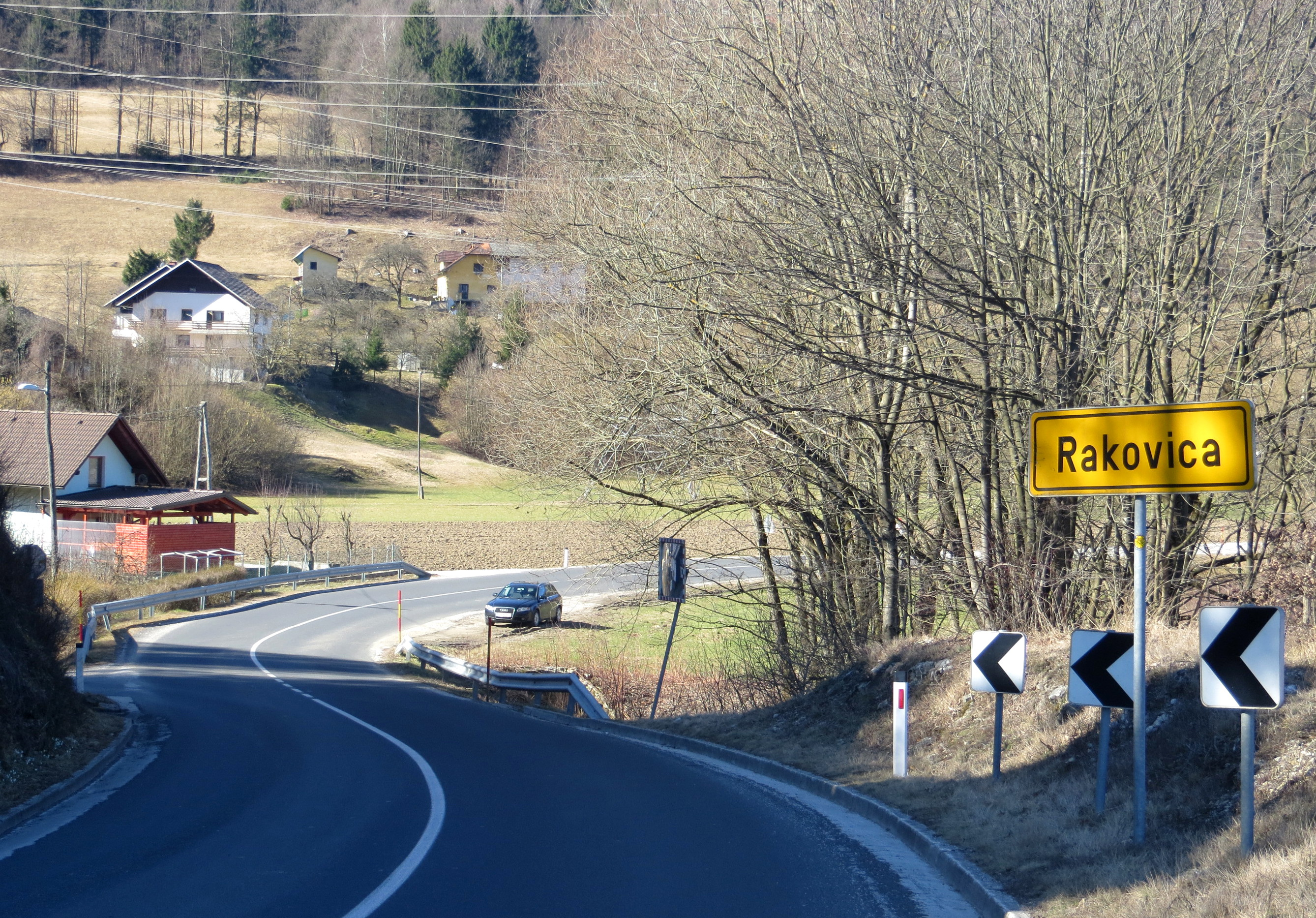

- Location in Slovenia
- Coordinates: 46°14′52.03″N 14°19′28.99″E
- Country: Slovenia
- Traditional region: Upper Carniola
- Statistical region: Upper Carniola
- Municipality: Kranj

Area
  - Total: 0.59 km^{2} (0.23 sq mi)
- Elevation: 377.2 m (1,238 ft)

Population (2002)
  - Total: 69

Rakovica (pronounced [ˈɾaːkɔʋitsa]) is a settlement on the right bank of the Sava River northwest of Kranj in the Upper Carniola region of Slovenia.
