= Ilovka =

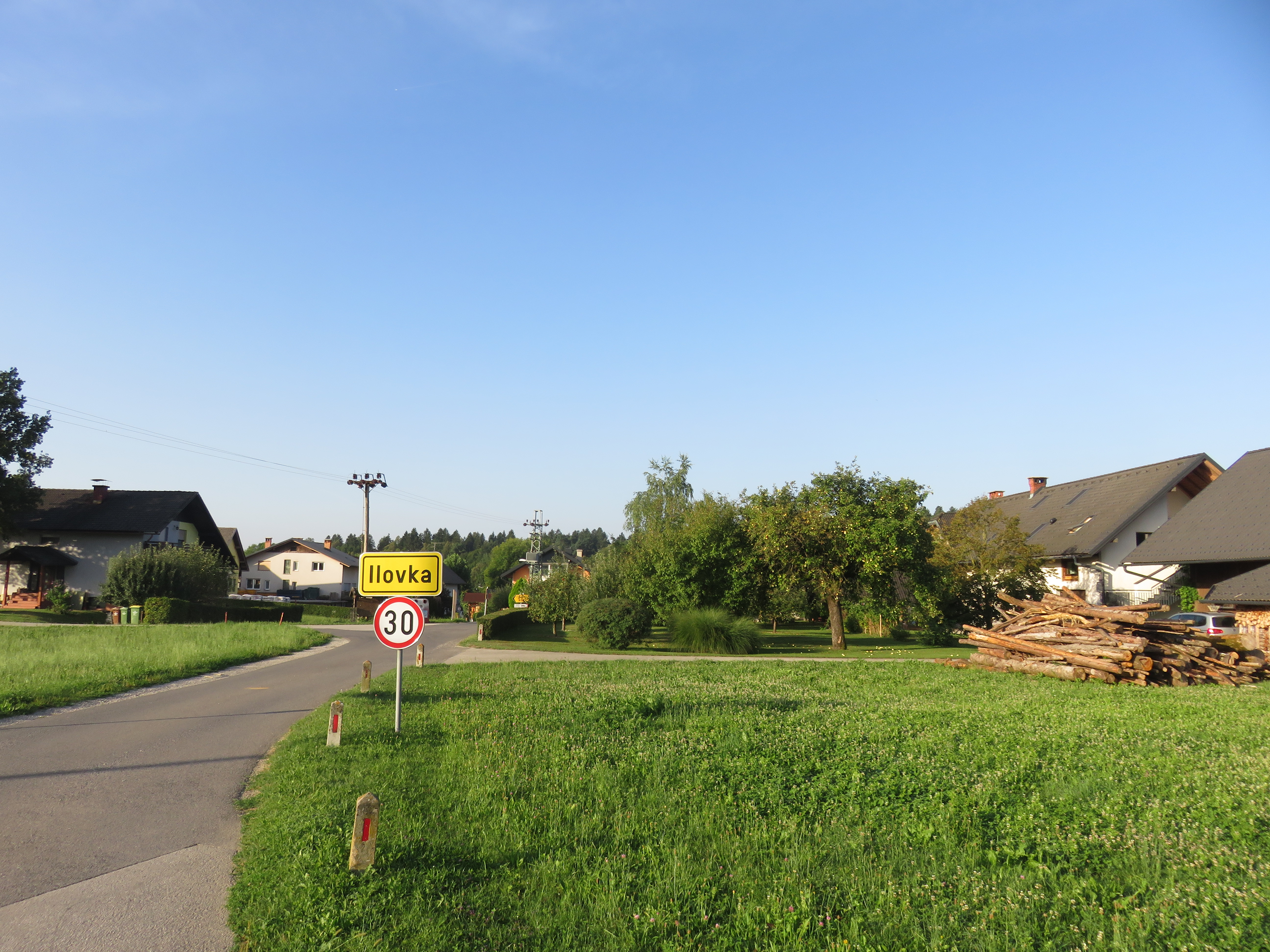

- Location in Slovenia
- Coordinates: 46°15′46.69″N 14°22′6.63″E
- Country: Slovenia
- Traditional region: Upper Carniola
- Statistical region: Upper Carniola
- Municipality: Kranj

Area
  - Total: 0.78 km^{2} (0.30 sq mi)
- Elevation: 404.3 m (1,326 ft)

Population (2002)
  - Total: 53

Ilovka (pronounced [ˈiːlɔu̯ka]) is a small settlement in the Municipality of Kranj in the Upper Carniola region of Slovenia.
