= Srednje Bitnje =

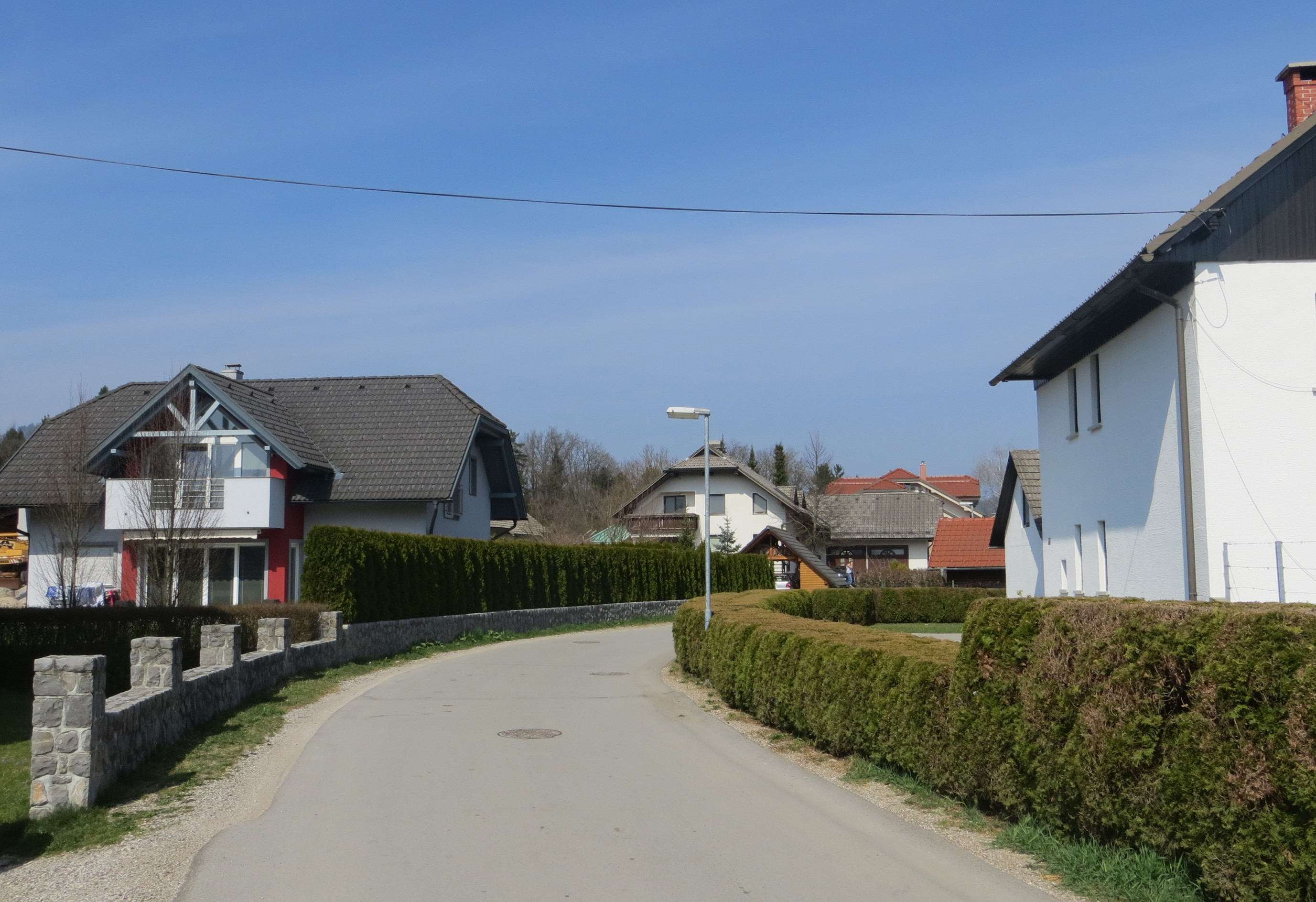

- Location in Slovenia
- Coordinates: 46°12′50.21″N 14°20′15.03″E
- Country: Slovenia
- Traditional region: Upper Carniola
- Statistical region: Upper Carniola
- Municipality: Kranj

Area
  - Total: 5.07 km^{2} (1.96 sq mi)
- Elevation: 382.2 m (1,254 ft)

Population (2002)
  - Total: 540

Srednje Bitnje (pronounced [ˈsɾeːdnjɛ ˈbiːtnjɛ]; German: Mitterfeichting) is a village south of Kranj in the Upper Carniola region of Slovenia.

The local church, built in a field outside the village, is dedicated to Saint Ursula.
