= Zgornje Bitnje =

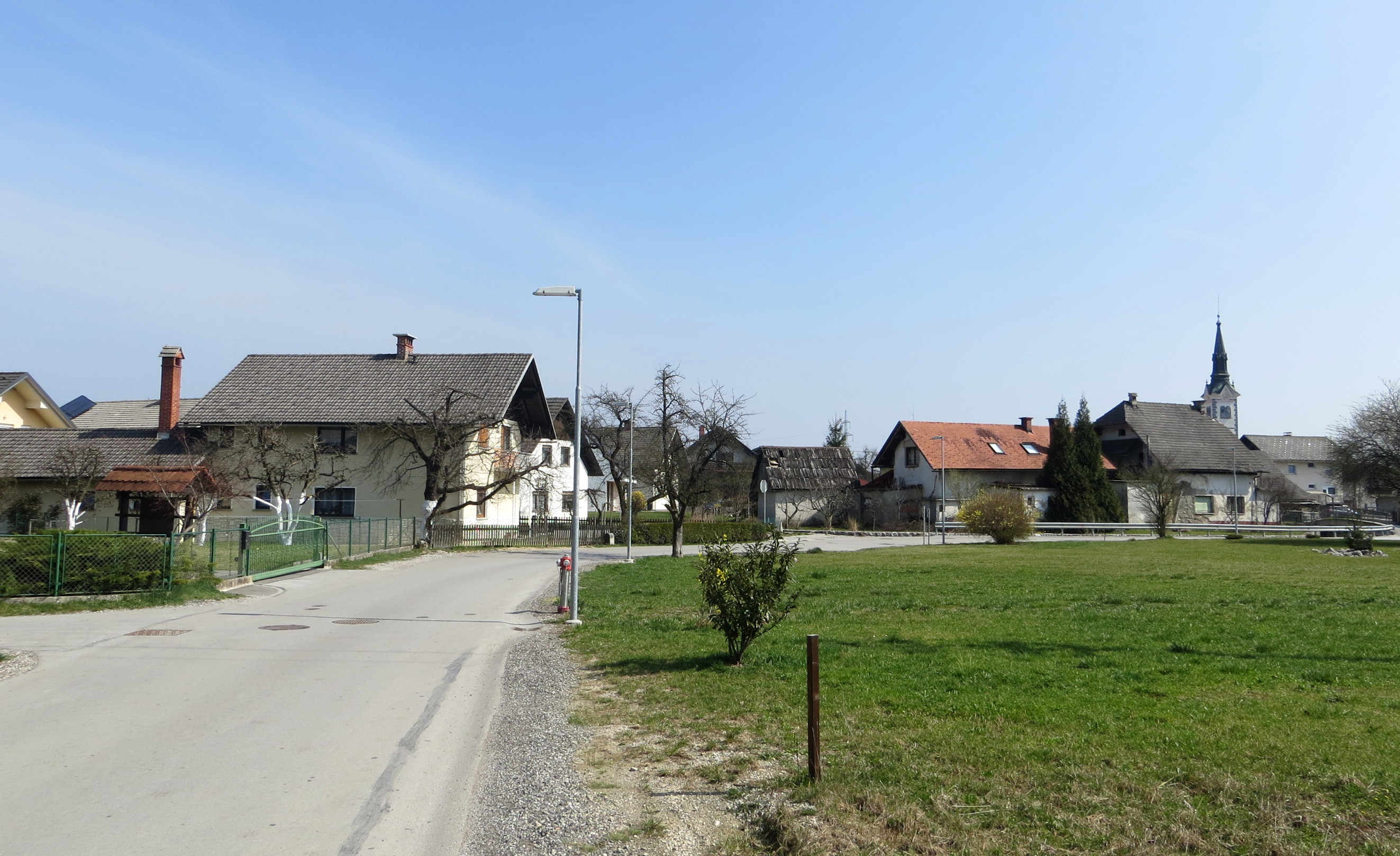

- Location in Slovenia
- Coordinates: 46°13′12.2″N 14°20′14.54″E
- Country: Slovenia
- Traditional region: Upper Carniola
- Statistical region: Upper Carniola
- Municipality: Kranj

Area
  - Total: 2.8 km^{2} (1.1 sq mi)
- Elevation: 383.1 m (1,257 ft)

Population (2015)
  - Total: 1,555
  - Density: 560/km^{2} (1,400/sq mi)
- Postal code: 4209

Zgornje Bitnje (pronounced [ˈzɡoːɾnjɛ ˈbiːtnjɛ]; German: Oberfeichting) is a settlement just south of Kranj in the Upper Carniola region of Slovenia.

== Church ==
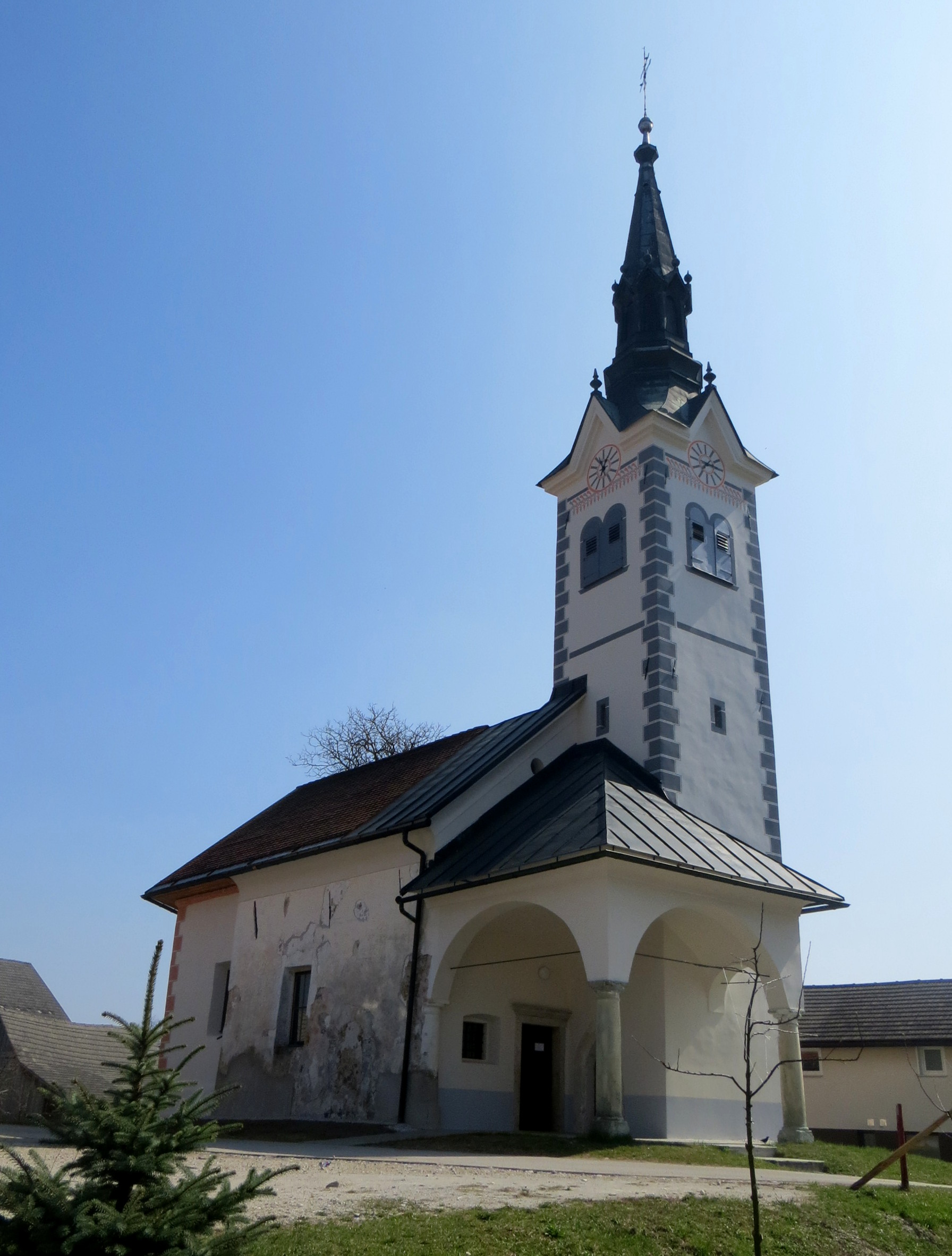
Saint Thomas's Church

The local church is dedicated to Saint Thomas.
