= Spodnje Bitnje =

Villiage in Upper Carniola, Slovenia

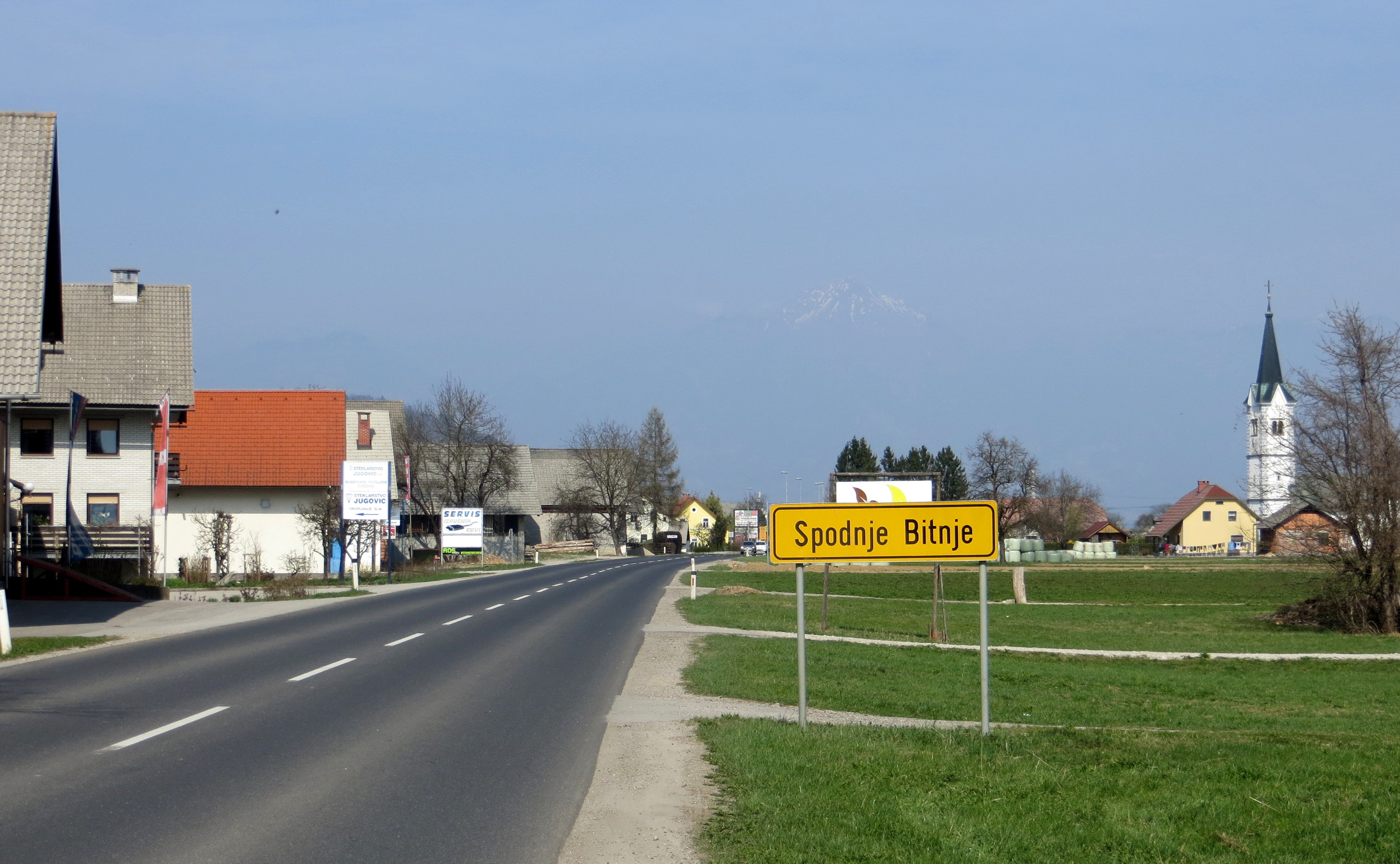

- Location in Slovenia
- Coordinates: 46°12′23.88″N 14°20′3.92″E
- Country: Slovenia
- Traditional region: Upper Carniola
- Statistical region: Upper Carniola
- Municipality: Kranj

Area
  - Total: 3.47 km^{2} (1.34 sq mi)
- Elevation: 378.4 m (1,241 ft)

Population (2002)
  - Total: 237

Spodnje Bitnje (pronounced [ˈspoːdnjɛ ˈbiːtnjɛ]; German: Unterfeichting) is a village south of Kranj in the Upper Carniola region of Slovenia.

== Church ==
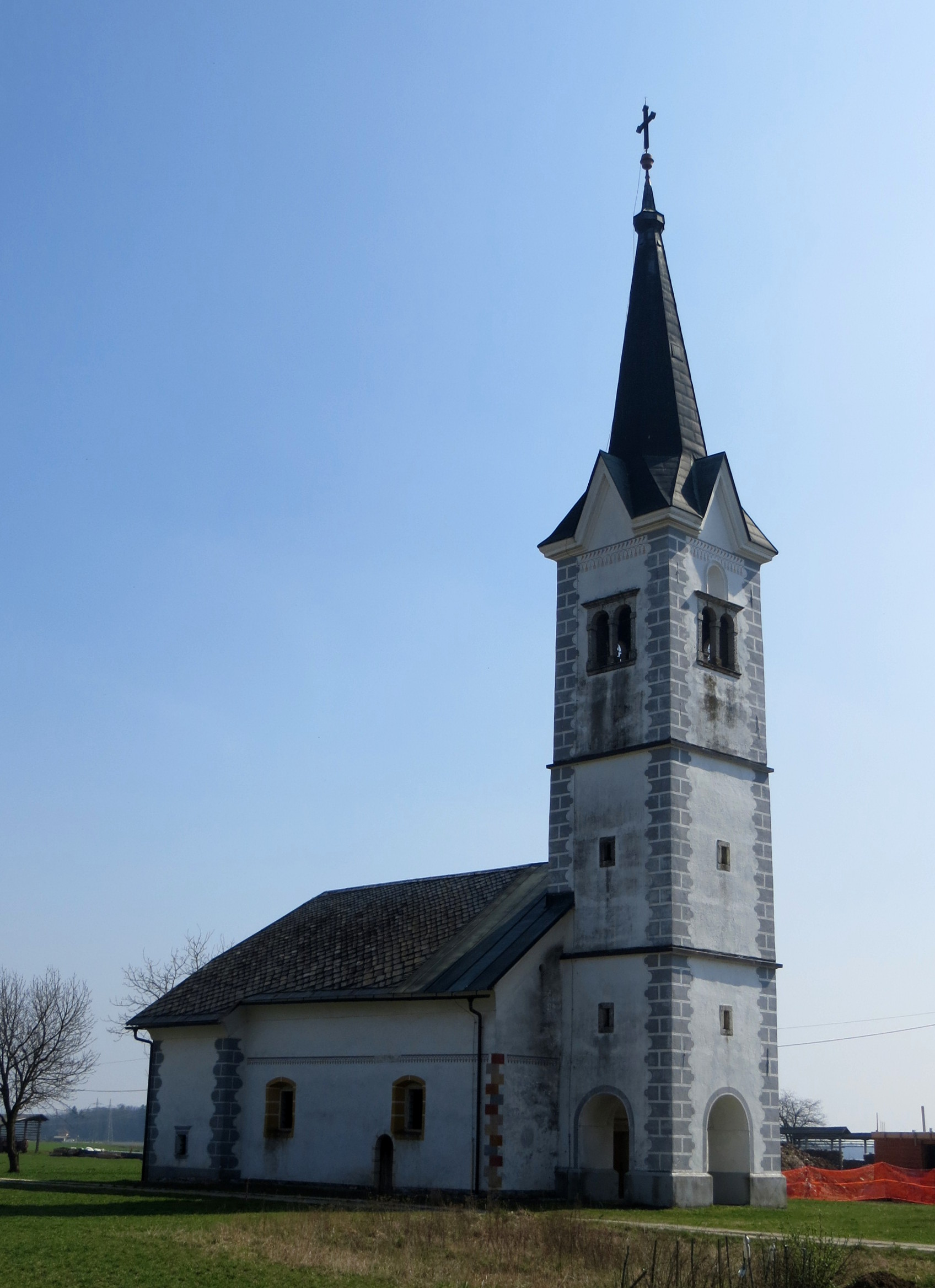
Saint Nicholas's Church

The local church is dedicated to Saint Nicholas and belongs to the Parish of Žabnica.
