= Šutna, Kranj =

Šutna
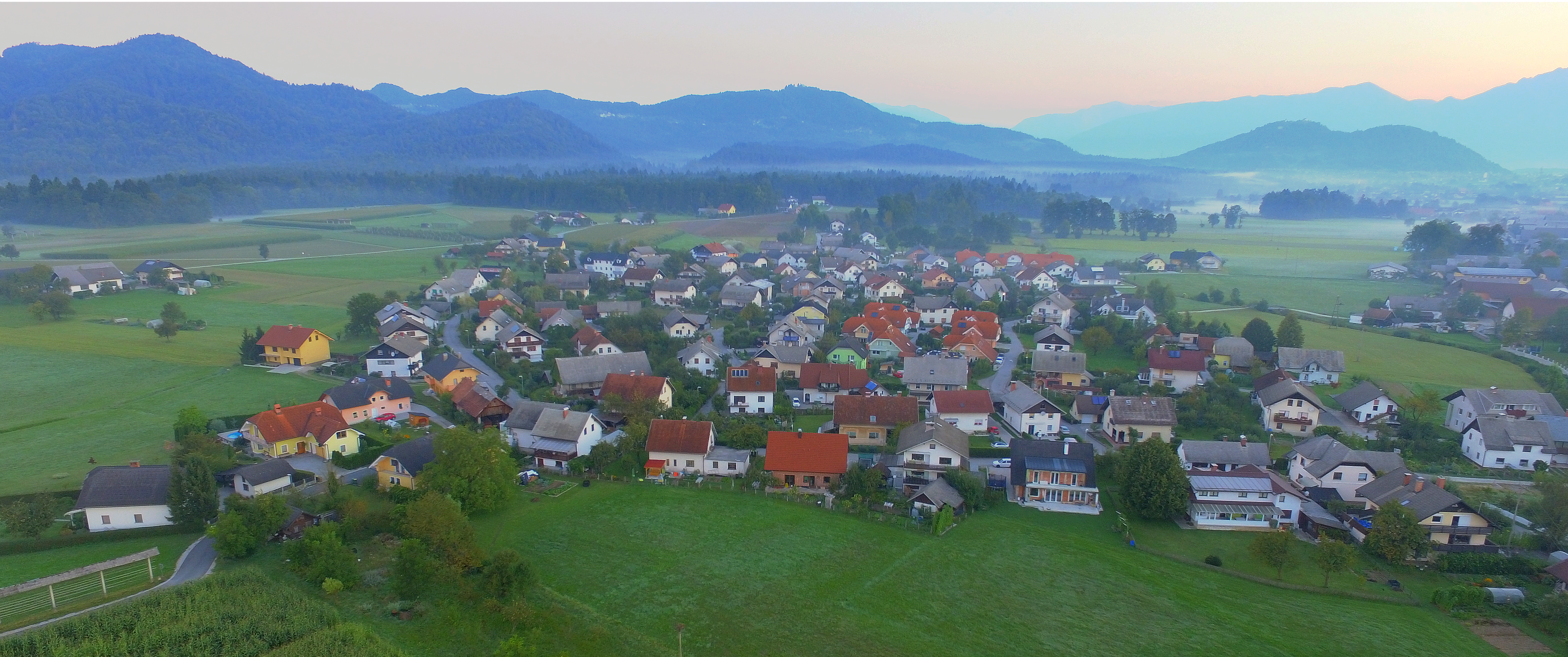

- Location in Slovenia
- Coordinates: 46°12′9.46″N 14°19′35.17″E
- Country: Slovenia
- Traditional region: Upper Carniola
- Statistical region: Upper Carniola
- Municipality: Kranj

Area
  - Total: 3.88 km^{2} (1.50 sq mi)
- Elevation: 377.7 m (1,239 ft)

Population (2002)
  - Total: 420

Šutna (pronounced [ˈʃuːtna]) is a village in the Municipality of Kranj in the Upper Carniola region of Slovenia.

== Name ==
The name of the village was changed from Šutna - del (literally, 'part of Šutna') to Šutna in 1979. The epithet del referred to part of the village being in the Municipality of Kranj and part being in the Municipality of Škofja Loka. The part of the village in the Municipality of Škofja Loka was incorporated into Dorfarje in 1979.
