= Urban Municipality of Kranj =

Urban municipality of Slovenia

Urban Municipality of Kranj Mestna občina Kranj
- Urban municipality
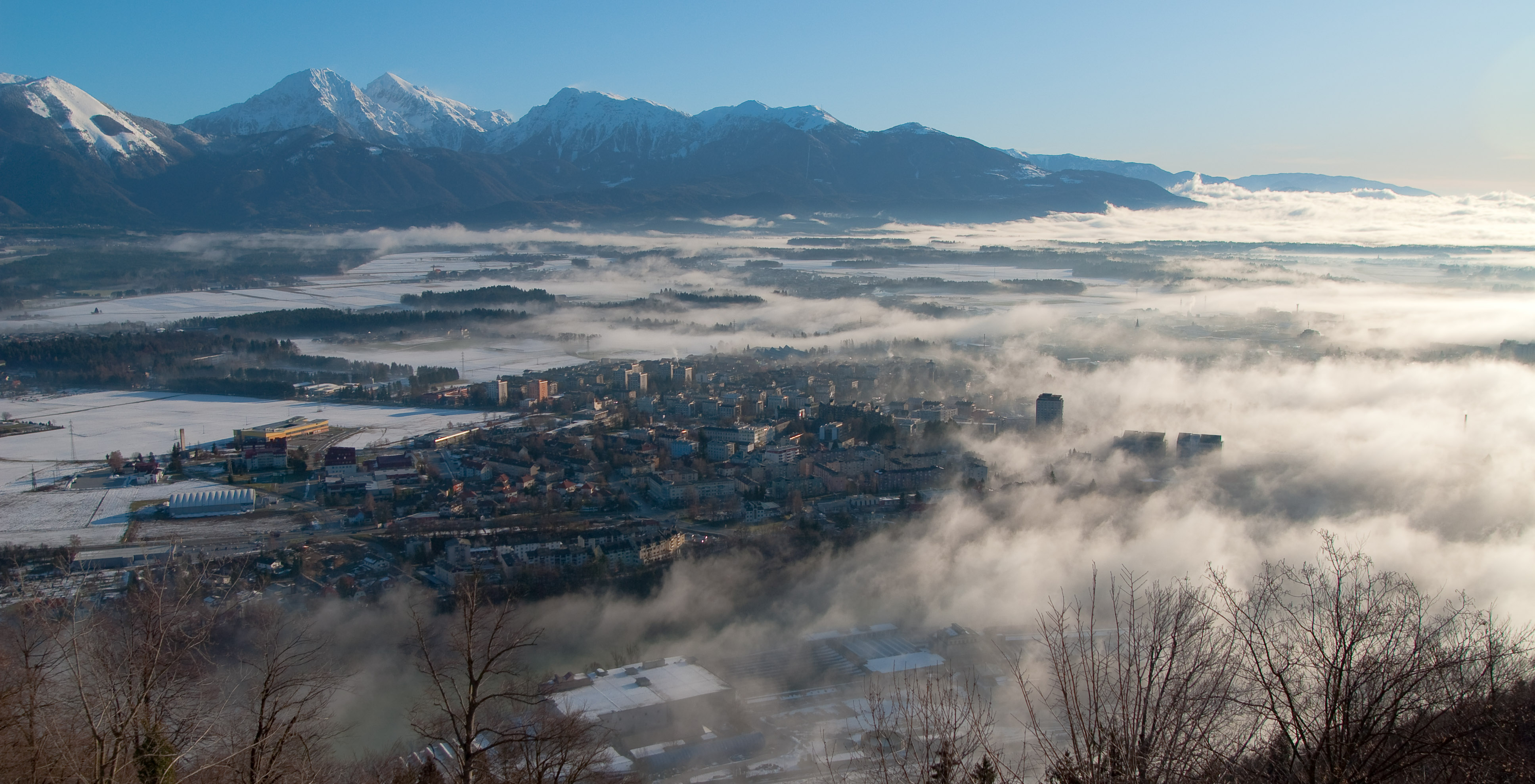

- Coat of arms

- Location of the Urban Municipality of Kranj in Slovenia
- Coordinates: 46°14′N 14°21′E
- Country: Slovenia

Government
  - Mayor: Matjaž Rakovec (SD)

Area
  - Total: 151.0 km^{2} (58.3 sq mi)

Population (2018)
  - Total: 55,795
  - Density: 369.5/km^{2} (957.0/sq mi)
- Time zone: UTC+01 (CET)
  - Summer (DST): UTC+02 (CEST)
- Website: www.kranj.si

The Urban Municipality of Kranj (pronounced [ˈkɾaːn]; Slovene: Mestna občina Kranj) is one of twelve urban municipalities of Slovenia. It lies in northwestern Slovenia and was established in 1994. Its seat is the town of Kranj. The area traditionally belongs to the region of Upper Carniola and has been included in Upper Carniola Statistical Region since 1995.

== Settlements ==
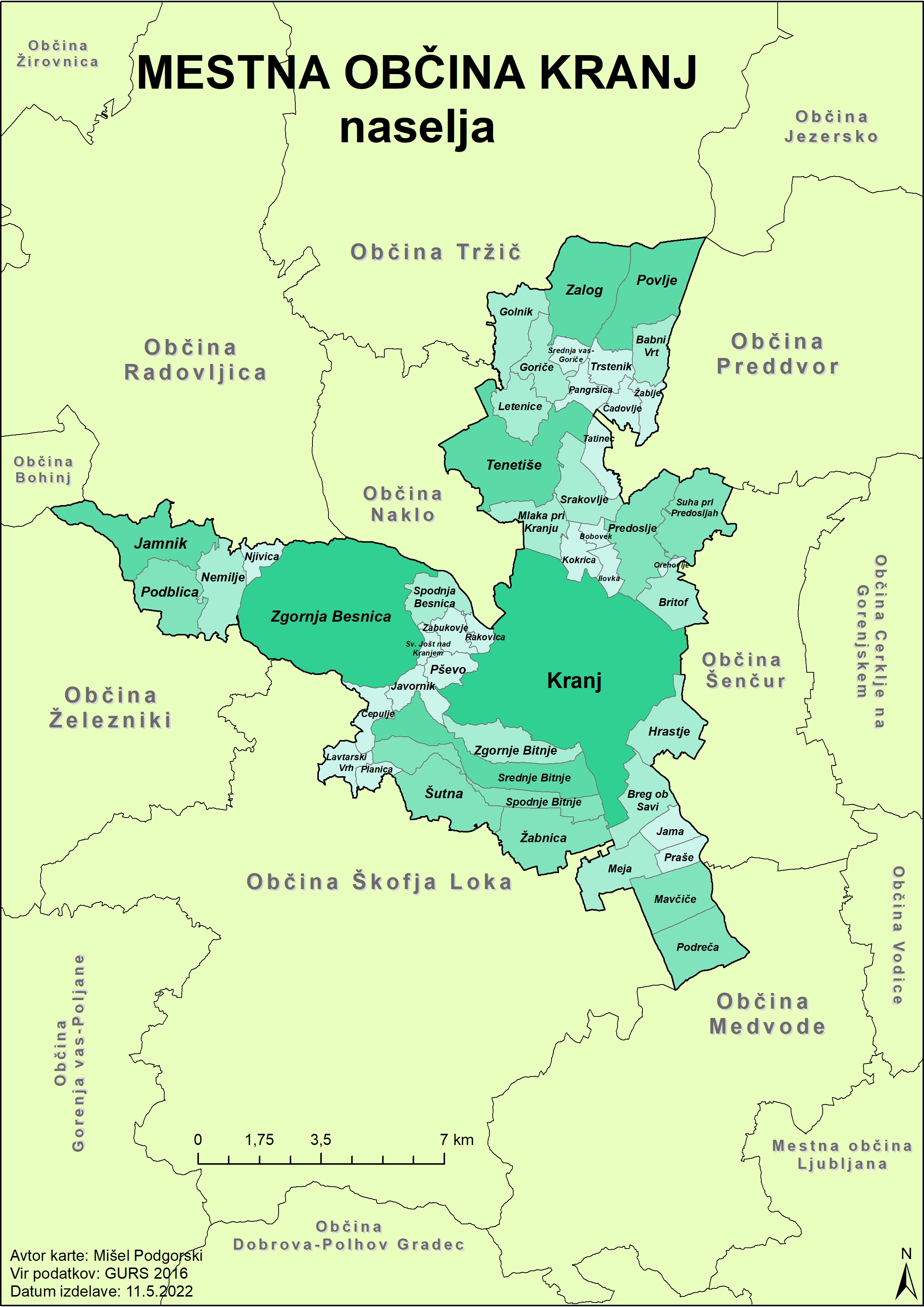
Villages in the municipality

In addition to the municipal seat of Kranj, the municipality also include the following settlements:

- Babni Vrt
- Bobovek
- Breg ob Savi
- Britof
- Čadovlje
- Čepulje
- Golnik
- Goriče
- Hrastje
- Ilovka
- Jama
- Jamnik
- Javornik
- Kokrica
- Lavtarski Vrh
- Letenice
- Mavčiče
- Meja
- Mlaka pri Kranju
- Nemilje
- Njivica
- Orehovlje
- Pangršica
- Planica
- Podblica
- Podreča
- Povlje
- Praše
- Predoslje
- Pševo
- Rakovica
- Spodnja Besnica
- Spodnje Bitnje
- Srakovlje
- Srednja Vas–Goriče
- Srednje Bitnje
- Suha pri Predosljah
- Šutna
- Sveti Jošt nad Kranjem
- Tatinec
- Tenetiše
- Trstenik
- Žablje
- Žabnica
- Zabukovje
- Zalog
- Zgornja Besnica
- Zgornje Bitnje
