= Kranj (National Assembly constituency) =

Constituency in Slovenia

- Constituency for the National Assembly
- Location of Kranj within Slovenia
- Municipality: List: Bled; Bohinj; Cerklje na Gorenjskem; Cerkno; Gorenja Vas–Poljane; Gorje; Idrija; Jesenice; Jezersko; Kamnik; Komenda; Kranj; Kranjska Gora; Naklo; Preddvor; Radovljica; Šenčur; Škofja Loka; Tržič; Železniki; Žiri; Žirovnica
- Population: 262,663 (2025)
- Electorate: 208,971 (2026)
- Area: 2,851 km^{2} (2024)

Current Constituency
- Created: 1992
- Seats: 11 (1992–present)
- Deputies: List: Alenka Bratušek (Svoboda); Tina Brecelj (Levica); Sandra Gazinkovski (Svoboda); Andrej Kosec (SDS); Žan Mahnič (SDS); Andrej Poglajen (SDS); Borut Sajovic (Svoboda); Marjeta Šmid (FOKUS); Zoran Stevanović (Resni.ca); Janez Žakelj (NSi); Elena Zavadlav Ušaj (D)
- Electoral districts: List: Idrija; Jesenice; Kamnik; Kranj 1; Kranj 2; Kranj 3; Radovljica 1; Radovljica 2; Škofja Loka 1; Škofja Loka 2; Tržič

Kranj, officially known as the 1st constituency (Slovene: 1. volilna enota), is one of the eight multi-member constituencies (electoral units) of the National Assembly, the national legislature of Slovenia. The constituency was established in 1992 following Slovenia's independence from Yugoslavia. It consists of the municipalities of Bled, Bohinj, Cerklje na Gorenjskem, Cerkno, Gorenja Vas–Poljane, Gorje, Idrija, Jesenice, Jezersko, Kamnik, Komenda, Kranj, Kranjska Gora, Naklo, Preddvor, Radovljica, Šenčur, Škofja Loka, Tržič, Železniki, Žiri and Žirovnica. The constituency currently elects 11 of the 90 members of the National Assembly using the open party-list proportional representation electoral system. At the 2026 parliamentary election the constituency had 208,971 registered electors.

== History ==
The 1st constituency (Kranj) was one of the eight constituencies established by the Determination of Constituencies for the Election of Deputies to the National Assembly Act (ZDVEDZ) (Zakon o določitvi volilnih enot za volitve poslancev v državni zbor (ZDVEDZ)) passed by the Assembly of the Republic of Slovenia (Skupščina Republike Slovenije) in September 1992. It consisted of the municipalities of Idrija, Jesenice, Kamnik, Kranj, Radovljica, Škofja Loka and Tržič.

Following the re-organisation of municipalities in October 1994, parts of Idrija municipality were transferred to the newly created Cerkno municipality; parts of Jesenice municipality were transferred to the newly created Kranjska Gora municipality; parts of Kranj municipality were transferred to the newly created municipalities of Cerklje na Gorenjskem, Naklo, Preddvor and Šenčur; parts of Radovljica municipality were transferred to the newly created municipalities of Bled and Bohinj; and parts of Škofja Loka municipality was split into the newly created municipalities of Gorenja Vas–Poljane, Železniki and Žiri.

In August 1998 parts of Jesenice municipality were transferred to the newly created Žirovnica municipality; parts of Kamnik municipality were transferred to the newly created Komenda municipality; and parts of Preddvor municipality were transferred to the newly created Jezersko municipality. Gorje municipality was created from parts of Bled municipality in June 2006.

In February 2021 the National Assembly passed Amendments and Supplements to the Determination of Constituencies for the Election of Deputies to the National Assembly Act (ZDVEDZ-B) (Zakon o spremembah in dopolnitvah Zakona o določitvi volilnih enot za volitve poslancev v državni zbor (ZDVEDZ-B)) which defined the Kranj constituency as consisting of the municipalities of Bled, Bohinj, Cerklje na Gorenjskem, Cerkno, Gorje, Gorenja Vas–Poljane, Idrija, Jesenice, Jezersko, Kamnik, Komenda, Kranj, Kranjska Gora, Naklo, Preddvor, Radovljica, Šenčur, Škofja Loka, Tržič, Železniki, Žiri and Žirovnica.

== Electoral system ==
Kranj currently elects 11 of the 90 members of the National Assembly using the open party-list proportional representation electoral system. Each constituency is divided into 11 electoral districts (volilni okraji) in which each party stands a single candidate. Electors vote for a candidate of their choice in their electoral district and then the votes received by each party's candidates are aggregated at the constituency level.

Allocation of seats was carried out in two stages. In the first stage, seats are allocated to parties at the constituency level using the Droop quota (Hare quota prior to 2006). In the second stage, unallocated seats from the first stage are aggregated at the national level and allocated to parties using the D'Hondt method (any seats won by the party at the constituency level are subtracted from the party's national seats). Though calculated nationally, national seats are allocated at the constituency level.

Since 2000, only parties that reach the 4% national threshold compete for seats at both constituency and national levels. Prior to this there was no threshold at the constituency level but parties needed to reach 3/88 (c3.4%) to compete for seats at the national level.

Seats won by each party in a constituency are allocated to the candidates with the highest percentage of votes. As a consequence, multiple candidates may be elected from an electoral district whilst others may have no candidates elected. Prior to 2000 parties had the option to have up to 50% of their national seats allocated in the order they appear on their party list (closed list).

== Electoral districts ==
Kranj is divided into 11 electoral districts:

- 1. Jesenice - municipalities of Jesenice, Kranjska Gora and Žirovnica.
- 2. Radovljica 1 - municipalities of Bled, Bohinj (except part of Nemški Rovt) and Gorje.
- 3. Radovljica 2 - municipalities of Bohinj (part of Nemški Rovt only) and Radovljica.
- 4. Kranj 1 - municipality of Kranj (Bobovek, Britof, Ilovka, Kokrica, Mlaka pri Kranju, Orehovlje, Predoslje, Srakovlje, Suha pri Predosljah, Tatinec and part of Kranj only).
- 5. Kranj 2 - municipality of Kranj (except Babni Vrt, Bobovek, Britof, Čadovlje, Golnik, Goriče, Hrastje, Ilovka, Kokrica, Letenice, Mlaka pri Kranju, Orehovlje, Pangršica, Povlje, Predoslje, Srakovlje, Srednja Vas–Goriče, Suha pri Predosljah, Tatinec, Tenetiše, Trstenik, Zalog, Žablje and part of Kranj).
- 6. Kranj 3 - municipalities of Cerklje na Gorenjskem, Jezersko, Kranj (Babni Vrt, Čadovlje, Golnik, Goriče, Hrastje, Letenice, Pangršica, Povlje, Srednja Vas–Goriče, Tenetiše, Trstenik, Zalog and Žablje only), Naklo, Preddvor and Šenčur.
- 7. Tržič - municipality of Tržič.
- 8. Škofja Loka 1 - municipality of Škofja Loka.
- 9. Škofja Loka 2 - municipalities of Gorenja Vas–Poljane, Železniki and Žiri.
- 10. Kamnik - municipalities of Kamnik and Komenda.
- 11. Idrija - municipalities of Cerkno and Idrija.

== Election results ==
=== Summary ===
| Election | Left Levica / ZL / TRS | | | Social Democrats SD / ZLSD / ZL | | | Freedom Movement Svoboda | | | Positive Slovenia PS / LZJ-PS | | | Liberal Democracy LDS | | | Let's Connect PoS / SMC | | | Slovenian People's SLS / SLS-SKD / SLS-SMS | | | Christian Democrats SKD | | | New Slovenia NSi | | | Slovenian Democrats SDS / SDSS | | | Slovenian Nationalists SNS | | |
| Election | Votes | % | Seats | Votes | % | Seats | Votes | % | Seats | Votes | % | Seats | Votes | % | Seats | Votes | % | Seats | Votes | % | Seats | Votes | % | Seats | Votes | % | Seats | Votes | % | Seats | Votes | % | Seats |
|---|---|---|---|---|---|---|---|---|---|---|---|---|---|---|---|---|---|---|---|---|---|---|---|---|---|---|---|---|---|---|---|---|---|
| 2026 | 9,014 | 5.95% | 0 | 8,108 | 5.35% | 0 | 39,573 | 26.13% | 3 | | | | | | | | | | with NSi | | | | | | 16,881 | 11.15% | 1 | 41,896 | 27.67% | 3 | 2,910 | 1.92% | 0 |
| 2022 | 6,792 | 4.43% | 0 | 8,137 | 5.31% | 0 | 48,970 | 31.97% | 3 | | | | | | | 5,127 | 3.35% | 0 | with PoS | | | | | | 12,980 | 8.48% | 1 | 34,599 | 22.59% | 2 | 1,933 | 1.26% | 0 |
| 2018 | 10,270 | 8.93% | 1 | 8,024 | 6.97% | 0 | | | | | | | | | | 8,894 | 7.73% | 0 | 2,360 | 2.05% | 0 | | | | 10,550 | 9.17% | 1 | 28,958 | 25.17% | 3 | 3,727 | 3.24% | 0 |
| 2014 | 7,141 | 6.43% | 0 | 4,573 | 4.12% | 0 | | | | 3,083 | 2.77% | 0 | | | | 37,541 | 33.78% | 4 | 4,140 | 3.73% | 0 | | | | 8,277 | 7.45% | 0 | 24,537 | 22.08% | 2 | 2,170 | 1.95% | 0 |
| 2011 | 2,173 | 1.53% | 0 | 12,086 | 8.54% | 1 | | | | 43,233 | 30.53% | 3 | 1,488 | 1.05% | 0 | | | | 8,760 | 6.19% | 0 | | | | 9,301 | 6.57% | 0 | 36,617 | 25.86% | 3 | 2,101 | 1.48% | 0 |
| 2008 | | | | 39,600 | 29.69% | 3 | | | | | | | 7,347 | 5.51% | 0 | | | | 6,084 | 4.56% | 0 | 558 | 0.42% | 0 | 5,930 | 4.45% | 0 | 42,063 | 31.54% | 3 | 6,405 | 4.80% | 0 |
| 2004 | | | | 13,013 | 10.46% | 1 | | | | | | | 27,640 | 22.22% | 2 | | | | 10,019 | 8.05% | 0 | | | | 12,277 | 9.87% | 1 | 38,917 | 31.28% | 3 | 5,780 | 4.65% | 0 |
| 2000 | | | | 17,439 | 12.67% | 1 | | | | | | | 43,892 | 31.89% | 3 | | | | 12,307 | 8.94% | 1 | with SLS | | | 15,805 | 11.48% | 1 | 25,503 | 18.53% | 2 | 4,242 | 3.08% | 0 |
| 1996 | | | | 11,966 | 8.76% | 0 | | | | | | | 35,200 | 25.76% | 2 | | | | 26,149 | 19.14% | 2 | 14,584 | 10.67% | 1 | | | | 25,908 | 18.96% | 2 | 4,362 | 3.19% | 0 |
| 1992 | | | | 18,203 | 12.24% | 1 | | | | | | | 31,405 | 21.11% | 2 | | | | 12,657 | 8.51% | 0 | 23,847 | 16.03% | 1 | | | | 4,701 | 3.16% | 0 | 23,051 | 15.50% | 1 |

(Excludes national seats. Figures in italics represent alliances/joint lists.)

=== Detailed ===
Party has received at least 4% of the vote nationally (since 2000).

==== 2020s ====
===== 2026 =====
Results of the 2026 parliamentary election held on 22 March 2026:

| Party | | Votes per electoral district | | | | | | | | | | | Total votes | % | Seats | | |
| Party | | Idrija | Jese- nice | Kamnik | Kranj 1 | Kranj 2 | Kranj 3 | Rado- vljica 1 | Rado- vljica 2 | Škofja Loka 1 | Škofja Loka 2 | Tržič | Total votes | % | Con. | Nat. | Tot. |
|---|---|---|---|---|---|---|---|---|---|---|---|---|---|---|---|---|---|
| Slovenian Democratic Party | SDS | 2,825 | 3,495 | 5,526 | 3,277 | 3,403 | 6,388 | 2,767 | 2,822 | 4,077 | 5,103 | 2,213 | 41,896 | 27.67% | 3 | 0 | 3 |
| Freedom Movement | Svoboda | 2,676 | 5,969 | 5,674 | 4,169 | 3,958 | 3,908 | 2,343 | 3,066 | 3,346 | 1,939 | 2,525 | 39,573 | 26.13% | 3 | 0 | 3 |
| New Slovenia – Christian Democrats, Slovenian People's Party and Focus | NSi-SLS- FOKUS | 1,035 | 933 | 2,598 | 1,076 | 1,497 | 2,722 | 932 | 1,076 | 2,108 | 2,184 | 720 | 16,881 | 11.15% | 1 | 1 | 2 |
| Resni.ca | Resni.ca | 441 | 1,512 | 1,088 | 1,356 | 1,698 | 1,163 | 557 | 874 | 800 | 525 | 627 | 10,641 | 7.03% | 0 | 1 | 1 |
| Democrats | D | 567 | 757 | 1,474 | 999 | 890 | 1,597 | 655 | 1,020 | 822 | 641 | 617 | 10,039 | 6.63% | 0 | 1 | 1 |
| The Left and Vesna – Green Party | Levica-Vesna | 424 | 854 | 1,225 | 1,086 | 1,017 | 888 | 630 | 802 | 1,040 | 612 | 436 | 9,014 | 5.95% | 0 | 1 | 1 |
| Social Democrats | SD | 742 | 899 | 1,055 | 790 | 757 | 917 | 530 | 644 | 649 | 610 | 515 | 8,108 | 5.35% | 0 | 0 | 0 |
| Prerod | Prerod | 274 | 748 | 654 | 436 | 486 | 642 | 651 | 437 | 418 | 265 | 281 | 5,292 | 3.49% | 0 | 0 | 0 |
| Pirate Party | Pirati | 253 | 408 | 583 | 407 | 399 | 515 | 275 | 347 | 302 | 237 | 202 | 3,928 | 2.59% | 0 | 0 | 0 |
| Slovenian National Party | SNS | 218 | 289 | 445 | 235 | 272 | 378 | 204 | 208 | 239 | 201 | 221 | 2,910 | 1.92% | 0 | 0 | 0 |
| We, Socialists! | MI! | 47 | 113 | 85 | 64 | 85 | 74 | 75 | 62 | 104 | 33 | 42 | 784 | 0.52% | 0 | 0 | 0 |
| Voice of Pensioners | GU | 43 | 101 | 97 | 46 | 67 | 89 | 42 | 54 | 55 | 40 | 59 | 693 | 0.46% | 0 | 0 | 0 |
| Alternative for Slovenia | AzaS | 45 | 75 | 95 | 68 | 56 | 69 | 54 | 61 | 63 | 46 | 47 | 679 | 0.45% | 0 | 0 | 0 |
| Greens of Slovenia and Party of Generations | ZS-SG | 30 | 60 | 70 | 48 | 70 | 81 | 40 | 46 | 41 | 40 | 29 | 555 | 0.37% | 0 | 0 | 0 |
| Karl Erjavec - Trust Party | SZ | 30 | 54 | 70 | 49 | 42 | 61 | 23 | 29 | 23 | 39 | 17 | 437 | 0.29% | 0 | 0 | 0 |
| Valid votes | | 9,650 | 16,267 | 20,739 | 14,106 | 14,697 | 19,492 | 9,778 | 11,548 | 14,087 | 12,515 | 8,551 | 151,430 | 100.00% | 7 | 4 | 11 |
| Rejected votes | | 152 | 210 | 157 | 125 | 143 | 174 | 119 | 110 | 140 | 104 | 98 | 1,532 | 1.00% | | | |
| Total polled | | 9,802 | 16,477 | 20,896 | 14,231 | 14,840 | 19,666 | 9,897 | 11,658 | 14,227 | 12,619 | 8,649 | 152,962 | 73.20% | | | |
| Registered electors | | 13,229 | 25,996 | 28,185 | 20,303 | 20,478 | 24,697 | 13,446 | 16,009 | 18,705 | 15,552 | 12,371 | 208,971 | | | | |
| Turnout | | 74.09% | 63.38% | 74.14% | 70.09% | 72.47% | 79.63% | 73.61% | 72.82% | 76.06% | 81.14% | 69.91% | 73.20% | | | | |

The following candidates were elected:

- Constituency seats - Alenka Bratušek (Svoboda, Jesenice & Kranj 2), 9,927 votes; Sandra Gazinkovski (Svoboda, Kranj 1), 4,169 votes; Andrej Kosec (SDS, Kranj 3), 6,388 votes; Žan Mahnič (SDS, Škofja Loka 2), 5,103 votes; Andrej Poglajen (SDS, Idrija), 2,825 votes; Borut Sajovic (Svoboda, Tržič), 2,525 votes; and Janez Žakelj (NSi-SLS-FOKUS, Škofja Loka 2), 2,184 votes.
- National seats - Tina Brecelj (Levica, Škofja Loka 1), 1,040 votes; Tea Košir (D, Radovljica 2), 1,020 votes; Marjeta Šmid (NSi-SLS-FOKUS, Škofja Loka 1), 2,108 votes; and Zoran Stevanović (Resni.ca, Kranj 2), 1,698 votes.

Substitutions:

- Tea Košir (D, Radovljica 2) forfeited her seat on 10 June 2026 upon being appointed to the government and was replaced by Elena Zavadlav Ušaj (D, Kranj 3) on 15 June 2026.

===== 2022 =====
Results of the 2022 parliamentary election held on 24 April 2022:

| Party | | Votes per electoral district | | | | | | | | | | | Total votes | % | Seats | | |
| Party | | Idrija | Jese- nice | Kamnik | Kranj 1 | Kranj 2 | Kranj 3 | Rado- vljica 1 | Rado- vljica 2 | Škofja Loka 1 | Škofja Loka 2 | Tržič | Total votes | % | Con. | Nat. | Tot. |
|---|---|---|---|---|---|---|---|---|---|---|---|---|---|---|---|---|---|
| Freedom Movement | Svoboda | 3,041 | 5,846 | 6,611 | 5,272 | 5,149 | 5,384 | 3,191 | 4,057 | 4,410 | 2,742 | 3,267 | 48,970 | 31.97% | 3 | 2 | 5 |
| Slovenian Democratic Party | SDS | 2,270 | 3,148 | 4,069 | 2,821 | 2,911 | 4,927 | 2,196 | 2,393 | 3,753 | 4,202 | 1,909 | 34,599 | 22.59% | 2 | 1 | 3 |
| New Slovenia – Christian Democrats | NSi | 848 | 779 | 2,610 | 911 | 1,069 | 2,141 | 737 | 809 | 1,130 | 1,318 | 628 | 12,980 | 8.48% | 1 | 1 | 2 |
| Social Democrats | SD | 864 | 1,058 | 887 | 940 | 813 | 802 | 598 | 692 | 594 | 530 | 359 | 8,137 | 5.31% | 0 | 0 | 0 |
| List of Marjan Šarec | LMŠ | 446 | 702 | 2,768 | 581 | 566 | 807 | 404 | 562 | 478 | 406 | 299 | 8,019 | 5.24% | 0 | 0 | 0 |
| The Left | Levica | 354 | 694 | 791 | 796 | 730 | 639 | 498 | 577 | 938 | 429 | 346 | 6,792 | 4.43% | 0 | 1 | 1 |
| Resni.ca | | 272 | 957 | 472 | 746 | 855 | 655 | 290 | 530 | 422 | 332 | 378 | 5,909 | 3.86% | 0 | 0 | 0 |
| Let's Connect Slovenia | PoS | 512 | 462 | 395 | 302 | 409 | 1,115 | 418 | 248 | 515 | 600 | 151 | 5,127 | 3.35% | 0 | 0 | 0 |
| Party of Alenka Bratušek | SAB | 178 | 670 | 490 | 726 | 829 | 481 | 356 | 340 | 348 | 228 | 216 | 4,862 | 3.17% | 0 | 0 | 0 |
| For a Healthy Society | ZSi | 160 | 341 | 311 | 230 | 243 | 355 | 294 | 411 | 256 | 194 | 304 | 3,099 | 2.02% | 0 | 0 | 0 |
| Pirate Party | | 165 | 334 | 358 | 277 | 296 | 338 | 184 | 216 | 270 | 218 | 165 | 2,821 | 1.84% | 0 | 0 | 0 |
| Our Future and Good Country | SNP-DD | 114 | 626 | 275 | 183 | 206 | 258 | 154 | 169 | 219 | 153 | 158 | 2,515 | 1.64% | 0 | 0 | 0 |
| Vesna – Green Party | | 134 | 225 | 263 | 243 | 186 | 288 | 216 | 207 | 238 | 177 | 264 | 2,441 | 1.59% | 0 | 0 | 0 |
| Our Country | | 128 | 280 | 253 | 126 | 152 | 343 | 129 | 175 | 140 | 189 | 77 | 1,992 | 1.30% | 0 | 0 | 0 |
| Slovenian National Party | SNS | 142 | 194 | 211 | 173 | 177 | 282 | 162 | 140 | 175 | 175 | 102 | 1,933 | 1.26% | 0 | 0 | 0 |
| For the People of Slovenia | ZLS | 53 | 121 | 147 | 111 | 111 | 120 | 116 | 105 | 89 | 99 | 67 | 1,139 | 0.74% | 0 | 0 | 0 |
| Democratic Party of Pensioners of Slovenia | DeSUS | 45 | 129 | 96 | 93 | 72 | 63 | 45 | 54 | 61 | 51 | 53 | 762 | 0.50% | 0 | 0 | 0 |
| List of Boris Popovič – Let's Digitize Slovenia | LBP | 39 | 73 | 38 | 31 | 26 | 45 | 54 | 50 | 28 | 26 | 41 | 451 | 0.29% | 0 | 0 | 0 |
| Homeland League | DOM | 7 | 80 | 50 | 46 | 52 | 41 | 48 | 30 | 35 | 30 | 11 | 430 | 0.28% | 0 | 0 | 0 |
| Liberate Slovenia Alliance | ZOS | 9 | 37 | 11 | 14 | 10 | 18 | 20 | 25 | 13 | 6 | 13 | 176 | 0.11% | 0 | 0 | 0 |
| Valid votes | | 9,781 | 16,756 | 21,106 | 14,622 | 14,862 | 19,102 | 10,110 | 11,790 | 14,112 | 12,105 | 8,808 | 153,154 | 100.00% | 6 | 5 | 11 |
| Rejected votes | | 154 | 225 | 177 | 116 | 133 | 174 | 105 | 126 | 125 | 104 | 107 | 1,546 | 1.00% | | | |
| Total polled | | 9,935 | 16,981 | 21,283 | 14,738 | 14,995 | 19,276 | 10,215 | 11,916 | 14,237 | 12,209 | 8,915 | 154,700 | 74.13% | | | |
| Registered electors | | 13,497 | 26,220 | 27,960 | 20,383 | 20,456 | 24,293 | 13,434 | 15,916 | 18,616 | 15,419 | 12,493 | 208,687 | | | | |
| Turnout | | 73.61% | 64.76% | 76.12% | 72.31% | 73.30% | 79.35% | 76.04% | 74.87% | 76.48% | 79.18% | 71.36% | 74.13% | | | | |

The following candidates were elected:

- Constituency seats - Andrej Hoivik (SDS, Škofja Loka 1), 3,753 votes; Andreja Kert (Svoboda, Kranj 1), 5,272 votes; Žan Mahnič (SDS, Škofja Loka 2), 4,202 votes; Borut Sajovic (Svoboda, Tržič), 3,267 votes; Katarina Štravs (Svoboda, Jesenice), 5,846 votes; and Matej Tonin (NSi, Kamnik & Kranj 3), 4,751 votes.
- National seats - Sandra Gazinkovski (Svoboda, Kranj 2), 5,149 votes; Branko Grims (SDS, Kranj 3), 4,927 votes; Alma Intihar (Svoboda, Radovljica 2), 4,057 votes; Miha Kordiš (Levica, Škofja Loka 1), 938 votes; and Janez Žakelj (NSi, Škofja Loka 2), 1,318 votes.

Substitutions:

- Branko Grims (SDS, Kranj 3) forfeited his seat on 16 July 2024 upon being elected to the European Parliament and was replaced by Andrej Poglajen (SDS, Idrija) on 5 September 2024.
- Matej Tonin (NSi, Kamnik & Kranj 3) forfeited his seat on 16 July 2024 upon being elected to the European Parliament and was replaced by Franc Medic (NSi, Idrija) on 5 September 2024.
- Borut Sajovic (Svoboda, Tržič) forfeited his seat on 7 October 2024 upon being elected to the government and was replaced by Aleš Lipičnik (Svoboda, Kamnik) on 21 October 2024.

==== 2010s ====
===== 2018 =====
Results of the 2018 parliamentary election held on 3 June 2018:

| Party | | Votes per electoral district | | | | | | | | | | | Total votes | % | Seats | | |
| Party | | Idrija | Jese- nice | Kamnik | Kranj 1 | Kranj 2 | Kranj 3 | Rado- vljica 1 | Rado- vljica 2 | Škofja Loka 1 | Škofja Loka 2 | Tržič | Total votes | % | Con. | Nat. | Tot. |
|---|---|---|---|---|---|---|---|---|---|---|---|---|---|---|---|---|---|
| Slovenian Democratic Party | SDS | 1,742 | 2,739 | 3,140 | 2,401 | 2,410 | 4,405 | 1,840 | 2,046 | 3,193 | 3,252 | 1,790 | 28,958 | 25.17% | 3 | 0 | 3 |
| List of Marjan Šarec | LMŠ | 1,039 | 1,759 | 6,160 | 1,535 | 1,449 | 2,241 | 1,042 | 1,305 | 1,357 | 1,199 | 1,022 | 20,108 | 17.48% | 2 | 1 | 3 |
| New Slovenia – Christian Democrats | NSi | 671 | 646 | 2,480 | 757 | 828 | 1,443 | 542 | 577 | 1,074 | 1,117 | 415 | 10,550 | 9.17% | 1 | 0 | 1 |
| The Left | Levica | 594 | 1,249 | 1,042 | 1,173 | 1,141 | 889 | 600 | 871 | 1,479 | 690 | 542 | 10,270 | 8.93% | 1 | 0 | 1 |
| Modern Centre Party | SMC | 595 | 1,012 | 1,039 | 967 | 994 | 1,010 | 609 | 750 | 818 | 530 | 570 | 8,894 | 7.73% | 0 | 1 | 1 |
| Social Democrats | SD | 1,034 | 1,044 | 656 | 808 | 770 | 778 | 595 | 719 | 634 | 520 | 466 | 8,024 | 6.97% | 0 | 1 | 1 |
| Party of Alenka Bratušek | SAB | 243 | 855 | 592 | 1,137 | 1,274 | 757 | 1,055 | 642 | 486 | 300 | 352 | 7,693 | 6.69% | 0 | 1 | 1 |
| Democratic Party of Pensioners of Slovenia | DeSUS | 184 | 640 | 419 | 486 | 448 | 401 | 347 | 281 | 309 | 212 | 394 | 4,121 | 3.58% | 0 | 0 | 0 |
| Slovenian National Party | SNS | 217 | 462 | 321 | 356 | 416 | 546 | 266 | 391 | 289 | 245 | 218 | 3,727 | 3.24% | 0 | 0 | 0 |
| Pirate Party | | 191 | 319 | 278 | 311 | 317 | 405 | 205 | 306 | 235 | 184 | 155 | 2,906 | 2.53% | 0 | 0 | 0 |
| Slovenian People's Party | SLS | 188 | 134 | 219 | 95 | 157 | 501 | 130 | 89 | 247 | 514 | 86 | 2,360 | 2.05% | 0 | 0 | 0 |
| Good Country | DD | 106 | 176 | 160 | 198 | 185 | 287 | 105 | 174 | 147 | 104 | 331 | 1,973 | 1.71% | 0 | 0 | 0 |
| List of Journalist Bojan Požar | LNBP | 70 | 138 | 109 | 116 | 92 | 135 | 62 | 97 | 95 | 66 | 67 | 1,047 | 0.91% | 0 | 0 | 0 |
| For a Healthy Society | ZD | 82 | 89 | 73 | 75 | 71 | 99 | 54 | 89 | 79 | 45 | 47 | 803 | 0.70% | 0 | 0 | 0 |
| Andrej Čuš and Greens of Slovenia | AČZS | 51 | 68 | 59 | 92 | 76 | 100 | 47 | 66 | 92 | 80 | 45 | 776 | 0.67% | 0 | 0 | 0 |
| United Slovenia | ZSi | 53 | 84 | 42 | 91 | 92 | 100 | 34 | 67 | 40 | 65 | 35 | 703 | 0.61% | 0 | 0 | 0 |
| United Left and Unity | ZLS | 22 | 82 | 43 | 74 | 67 | 53 | 23 | 48 | 58 | 17 | 21 | 508 | 0.44% | 0 | 0 | 0 |
| Movement Together Forward | GSN | 73 | 68 | 47 | 37 | 42 | 32 | 22 | 54 | 41 | 39 | 17 | 472 | 0.41% | 0 | 0 | 0 |
| Economic Active Party | GAS | 17 | 31 | 27 | 41 | 19 | 80 | 20 | 19 | 28 | 22 | 32 | 336 | 0.29% | 0 | 0 | 0 |
| Socialist Party of Slovenia | SPS | 14 | 65 | 31 | 24 | 25 | 17 | 23 | 25 | 19 | 6 | 13 | 262 | 0.23% | 0 | 0 | 0 |
| Solidarity–For a Fair Society! | | 27 | 36 | 12 | 15 | 19 | 19 | 15 | 20 | 17 | 18 | 6 | 204 | 0.18% | 0 | 0 | 0 |
| Forward Slovenia | NPS | 0 | 45 | 0 | 27 | 20 | 23 | 13 | 20 | 21 | 0 | 18 | 187 | 0.16% | 0 | 0 | 0 |
| Party of Slovenian People | SSN | 14 | 18 | 13 | 18 | 16 | 28 | 17 | 17 | 18 | 11 | 10 | 180 | 0.16% | 0 | 0 | 0 |
| Valid votes | | 7,227 | 11,759 | 16,962 | 10,834 | 10,928 | 14,349 | 7,666 | 8,673 | 10,776 | 9,236 | 6,652 | 115,062 | 100.00% | 7 | 4 | 11 |
| Rejected votes | | 161 | 165 | 174 | 146 | 122 | 168 | 103 | 83 | 127 | 124 | 110 | 1,483 | 1.27% | | | |
| Total polled | | 7,388 | 11,924 | 17,136 | 10,980 | 11,050 | 14,517 | 7,769 | 8,756 | 10,903 | 9,360 | 6,762 | 116,545 | 55.48% | | | |
| Registered electors | | 13,760 | 26,612 | 27,964 | 20,685 | 20,749 | 23,913 | 13,709 | 15,967 | 18,573 | 15,437 | 12,697 | 210,066 | | | | |
| Turnout | | 53.69% | 44.81% | 61.28% | 53.08% | 53.26% | 60.71% | 56.67% | 54.84% | 58.70% | 60.63% | 53.26% | 55.48% | | | | |

The following candidates were elected:

- Constituency seats - Branko Grims (SDS, Kranj 3), 4,405 votes; Miha Kordiš (Levica, Kranj 1 & Škofja Loka 1), 2,652 votes; Žan Mahnič (SDS, Škofja Loka 2), 3,252 votes; Igor Peček (LMŠ, Kranj 3), 2,241 votes; Marko Pogačnik (SDS, Škofja Loka 1), 3,193 votes; Marjan Šarec (LMŠ, Kamnik), 6,160 votes; and Matej Tonin (NSi, Kamnik), 2,480 votes.
- National seats - Samo Bevk (SD, Idrija), 1,034 votes; Franc Kramar (SAB, Radovljica 1), 1,055 votes; Edvard Paulič (LMŠ, Tržič), 1,022 votes; and Mateja Udovč (SMC, Kranj 2), 994 votes.

Substitutions:

- Marjan Šarec (LMŠ, Kamnik) forfeited his seat on 17 August 2018 upon being elected Prime Minister and was replaced by Karla Urh (LMŠ, Radovljica 2) on 23 August 2018.
- Karla Urh (LMŠ, Radovljica 2) forfeited her seat on 13 March 2020 when Marjan Šarec (LMŠ, Kamnik) lost his government position, regaining his seat.
- Matej Tonin (NSi, Kamnik) forfeited his seat on 13 March 2020 upon being elected to the government and was replaced by Mihael Prevc (NSi, Škofja Loka 2) on 19 March 2020.
- Žan Mahnič (SDS, Škofja Loka 2) forfeited his seat on 19 March 2020 upon being appointed to the government and was replaced by Jure Ferjan (SDS, Tržič) on the same day.
- Franc Kramar (SAB, Radovljica 1) died on 30 January 2021 and was replaced by Alenka Bratušek (SAB, Kranj 2) on 3 February 2021.

===== 2014 =====
Results of the 2014 parliamentary election held on 13 July 2014:

| Party | | Votes per electoral district | | | | | | | | | | | Total votes | % | Seats | | |
| Party | | Idrija | Jese- nice | Kamnik | Kranj 1 | Kranj 2 | Kranj 3 | Rado- vljica 1 | Rado- vljica 2 | Škofja Loka 1 | Škofja Loka 2 | Tržič | Total votes | % | Con. | Nat. | Tot. |
|---|---|---|---|---|---|---|---|---|---|---|---|---|---|---|---|---|---|
| Modern Centre Party | SMC | 2,449 | 4,240 | 5,128 | 3,958 | 3,827 | 4,028 | 2,661 | 3,210 | 3,344 | 2,292 | 2,404 | 37,541 | 33.78% | 4 | 0 | 4 |
| Slovenian Democratic Party | SDS | 1,481 | 2,123 | 3,053 | 2,018 | 1,991 | 3,748 | 1,619 | 1,628 | 2,862 | 2,639 | 1,375 | 24,537 | 22.08% | 2 | 1 | 3 |
| Democratic Party of Pensioners of Slovenia | DeSUS | 452 | 1,082 | 1,706 | 878 | 936 | 1,002 | 779 | 704 | 671 | 391 | 662 | 9,263 | 8.34% | 1 | 0 | 1 |
| New Slovenia – Christian Democrats | NSi | 540 | 497 | 1,938 | 638 | 693 | 1,212 | 439 | 517 | 782 | 728 | 293 | 8,277 | 7.45% | 0 | 1 | 1 |
| United Left | ZL | 419 | 696 | 892 | 842 | 779 | 715 | 474 | 591 | 844 | 521 | 368 | 7,141 | 6.43% | 0 | 1 | 1 |
| Alliance of Alenka Bratušek | ZaAB | 228 | 600 | 553 | 791 | 746 | 594 | 368 | 446 | 396 | 227 | 258 | 5,207 | 4.69% | 0 | 1 | 1 |
| Social Democrats | SD | 804 | 600 | 523 | 411 | 402 | 337 | 336 | 382 | 336 | 243 | 199 | 4,573 | 4.12% | 0 | 0 | 0 |
| Slovenian People's Party | SLS | 525 | 382 | 340 | 153 | 317 | 615 | 243 | 162 | 395 | 815 | 193 | 4,140 | 3.73% | 0 | 0 | 0 |
| Positive Slovenia | PS | 78 | 563 | 452 | 412 | 422 | 280 | 118 | 189 | 253 | 104 | 212 | 3,083 | 2.77% | 0 | 0 | 0 |
| Slovenian National Party | SNS | 96 | 165 | 271 | 175 | 218 | 294 | 263 | 179 | 209 | 176 | 124 | 2,170 | 1.95% | 0 | 0 | 0 |
| Pirate Party | | 95 | 195 | 240 | 241 | 188 | 271 | 183 | 175 | 130 | 106 | 0 | 1,824 | 1.64% | 0 | 0 | 0 |
| Civic List | DL | 72 | 48 | 78 | 69 | 85 | 65 | 97 | 69 | 133 | 558 | 33 | 1,307 | 1.18% | 0 | 0 | 0 |
| Verjamem | | 42 | 73 | 99 | 88 | 99 | 113 | 61 | 93 | 85 | 48 | 61 | 862 | 0.78% | 0 | 0 | 0 |
| Greens of Slovenia | ZS | 29 | 100 | 53 | 82 | 46 | 103 | 52 | 42 | 53 | 36 | 59 | 655 | 0.59% | 0 | 0 | 0 |
| Equal Land–Forward Slovenia | ED-NPS | 35 | 84 | 69 | 48 | 48 | 57 | 40 | 55 | 47 | 0 | 56 | 539 | 0.49% | 0 | 0 | 0 |
| Valid votes | | 7,345 | 11,448 | 15,395 | 10,804 | 10,797 | 13,434 | 7,733 | 8,442 | 10,540 | 8,884 | 6,297 | 111,119 | 100.00% | 7 | 4 | 11 |
| Rejected votes | | 138 | 182 | 182 | 160 | 167 | 209 | 126 | 132 | 157 | 132 | 124 | 1,709 | 1.51% | | | |
| Total polled | | 7,483 | 11,630 | 15,577 | 10,964 | 10,964 | 13,643 | 7,859 | 8,574 | 10,697 | 9,016 | 6,421 | 112,828 | 53.78% | | | |
| Registered electors | | 13,958 | 26,647 | 27,700 | 20,632 | 20,856 | 23,398 | 14,038 | 16,010 | 18,500 | 15,330 | 12,733 | 209,802 | | | | |
| Turnout | | 53.61% | 43.64% | 56.23% | 53.14% | 52.57% | 58.31% | 55.98% | 53.55% | 57.82% | 58.81% | 50.43% | 53.78% | | | | |

The following candidates were elected:

- Constituency seats - Julijana Bizjak Mlakar (DeSUS, Kamnik), 1,706 votes; Branko Grims (SDS, Kranj 3), 3,748 votes; Irena Kotnik (SMC, Radovljica 2), 3,210 votes; Žan Mahnič (SDS, Škofja Loka 2), 2,639 votes; Andreja Potočnik (SMC, Tržič), 2,404 votes; Maruša Škopac (SMC, Jesenice), 4,240 votes; and Branko Zorman (SMC, Kranj 1), 3,958 votes.
- National seats - Alenka Bratušek (ZaAB, Kranj 1 & Kranj 2), 1,537 votes; Miha Kordiš (ZL, Škofja Loka 1), 844 votes; Marko Pogačnik (SDS, Škofja Loka 1), 2,862 votes; and Matej Tonin (NSi, Kamnik), 1,938 votes.

Substitutions:

- Julijana Bizjak Mlakar (DeSUS, Kamnik)) forfeited her seat on 18 September 2014 upon being elected to the government and was replaced by Jana Jenko (DeSUS, Tržič) on 30 September 2014.
- Jana Jenko (DeSUS, Tržič) forfeited her seat on 25 April 2016 when Julijana Bizjak Mlakark (DeSUS, Kamnik) left her government position, regaining her seat.

===== 2011 =====
Results of the 2011 parliamentary election held on 4 December 2011:

| Party | | Votes per electoral district | | | | | | | | | | | Total votes | % | Seats | | |
| Party | | Idrija | Jese- nice | Kamnik | Kranj 1 | Kranj 2 | Kranj 3 | Rado- vljica 1 | Rado- vljica 2 | Škofja Loka 1 | Škofja Loka 2 | Tržič | Total votes | % | Con. | Nat. | Tot. |
|---|---|---|---|---|---|---|---|---|---|---|---|---|---|---|---|---|---|
| Zoran Janković's List – Positive Slovenia | LZJ-PS | 1,790 | 6,426 | 6,129 | 5,520 | 5,459 | 3,868 | 2,543 | 3,124 | 3,988 | 1,878 | 2,508 | 43,233 | 30.53% | 3 | 0 | 3 |
| Slovenian Democratic Party | SDS | 2,479 | 3,278 | 4,690 | 3,069 | 3,187 | 5,366 | 2,214 | 2,529 | 3,876 | 3,644 | 2,285 | 36,617 | 25.86% | 3 | 0 | 3 |
| Gregor Virant's Civic List | LGV | 776 | 1,367 | 1,444 | 1,167 | 1,209 | 1,509 | 816 | 967 | 1,128 | 1,095 | 795 | 12,273 | 8.67% | 1 | 0 | 1 |
| Social Democrats | SD | 1,467 | 1,581 | 1,441 | 1,200 | 1,196 | 1,066 | 910 | 1,040 | 893 | 704 | 588 | 12,086 | 8.54% | 1 | 0 | 1 |
| New Slovenia – Christian People's Party | NSi | 560 | 588 | 1,982 | 634 | 689 | 1,181 | 565 | 624 | 978 | 1,100 | 400 | 9,301 | 6.57% | 0 | 1 | 1 |
| Democratic Party of Pensioners of Slovenia | DeSUS | 425 | 1,031 | 1,533 | 885 | 918 | 1,043 | 726 | 703 | 645 | 515 | 702 | 9,126 | 6.44% | 0 | 1 | 1 |
| Slovenian People's Party | SLS | 889 | 638 | 974 | 477 | 622 | 1,696 | 471 | 533 | 816 | 1,209 | 435 | 8,760 | 6.19% | 0 | 1 | 1 |
| Party for Sustainable; Development of Slovenia | TRS | 146 | 244 | 228 | 335 | 260 | 236 | 140 | 179 | 163 | 122 | 120 | 2,173 | 1.53% | 0 | 0 | 0 |
| Slovenian National Party | SNS | 134 | 227 | 297 | 169 | 179 | 242 | 207 | 224 | 180 | 141 | 101 | 2,101 | 1.48% | 0 | 0 | 0 |
| Liberal Democracy of Slovenia | LDS | 63 | 192 | 170 | 147 | 123 | 135 | 155 | 112 | 100 | 87 | 204 | 1,488 | 1.05% | 0 | 0 | 0 |
| Zares | | 30 | 292 | 115 | 89 | 105 | 47 | 48 | 94 | 160 | 31 | 29 | 1,040 | 0.73% | 0 | 0 | 0 |
| Youth Party – European Greens | SMS-Z | 78 | 75 | 87 | 75 | 72 | 84 | 63 | 129 | 152 | 71 | 23 | 909 | 0.64% | 0 | 0 | 0 |
| Movement for Slovenia | GZS | 24 | 109 | 21 | 32 | 40 | 37 | 229 | 97 | 54 | 32 | 20 | 695 | 0.49% | 0 | 0 | 0 |
| Democratic Labour Party | DSD | 62 | 104 | 80 | 47 | 70 | 56 | 54 | 42 | 67 | 45 | 33 | 660 | 0.47% | 0 | 0 | 0 |
| Greens of Slovenia | ZS | 36 | 97 | 55 | 61 | 60 | 68 | 51 | 84 | 48 | 25 | 31 | 616 | 0.44% | 0 | 0 | 0 |
| Party of Equal Opportunities | SEM-Si | 23 | 35 | 34 | 30 | 34 | 34 | 30 | 24 | 40 | 26 | 12 | 322 | 0.23% | 0 | 0 | 0 |
| Party of Slovenian People | SSN | 12 | 25 | 20 | 13 | 29 | 23 | 11 | 20 | 20 | 18 | 9 | 200 | 0.14% | 0 | 0 | 0 |
| Valid votes | | 8,994 | 16,309 | 19,300 | 13,950 | 14,252 | 16,691 | 9,233 | 10,525 | 13,308 | 10,743 | 8,295 | 141,600 | 100.00% | 8 | 3 | 11 |
| Rejected votes | | 205 | 348 | 305 | 253 | 216 | 232 | 183 | 173 | 206 | 163 | 196 | 2,480 | 1.72% | | | |
| Total polled | | 9,199 | 16,657 | 19,605 | 14,203 | 14,468 | 16,923 | 9,416 | 10,698 | 13,514 | 10,906 | 8,491 | 144,080 | 68.85% | | | |
| Registered electors | | 14,041 | 26,789 | 27,518 | 20,772 | 20,831 | 22,963 | 13,977 | 15,977 | 18,455 | 15,202 | 12,745 | 209,270 | | | | |
| Turnout | | 65.52% | 62.18% | 71.24% | 68.38% | 69.45% | 73.70% | 67.37% | 66.96% | 73.23% | 71.74% | 66.62% | 68.85% | | | | |

The following candidates were elected:

- Constituency seats - Samo Bevk (SD, Idrija), 1,467 votes; Alenka Bratušek (LZJ-PS, Kranj 2), 5,459 votes; Branko Grims (SDS, Kranj 3), 5,366 votes; Alenka Pavlič (LZJ-PS, Jesenice), 6,426 votes; Marko Pogačnik (SDS, Škofja Loka 1), 3,876 votes; Lojz Potočnik (LZJ-PS, Kranj 1), 5,520 votes; Bojan Starman (LGV, Škofja Loka 2), 1,095 votes; and Irena Tavčar (SDS, Škofja Loka 2), 3,644 votes.
- National seats - Jana Jenko (DeSUS, Tržič), 702 votes; Mihael Prevc (SLS, Škofja Loka 2), 1,209 votes; and Matej Tonin (NSi, Kamnik), 1,982 votes.

Substitutions:

- Marko Pogačnik (SDS, Škofja Loka 1) forfeited his seat on 1 February 2013 upon being appointed to the government and was replaced by Rado Likar (SDS, Idrija) on 4 February 2013.
- Alenka Bratušek (LZJ-PS, Kranj 2) forfeited her seat on 27 February 2013 upon being elected Prime Minister and was replaced by Brane Golubović (LZJ-PS, Kamnik) on 4 March 2013.
- Rado Likar (SDS, Idrija) forfeited his seat on 20 March 2013 when Marko Pogačnik (SDS, Škofja Loka 1) lost his government position, regaining his seat.

==== 2000s ====
===== 2008 =====
Results of the 2008 parliamentary election held on 21 September 2008:

| Party | | Votes per electoral district | | | | | | | | | | | Total votes | % | Seats | | |
| Party | | Idrija | Jese- nice | Kamnik | Kranj 1 | Kranj 2 | Kranj 3 | Rado- vljica 1 | Rado- vljica 2 | Škofja Loka 1 | Škofja Loka 2 | Tržič | Total votes | % | Con. | Nat. | Tot. |
|---|---|---|---|---|---|---|---|---|---|---|---|---|---|---|---|---|---|
| Slovenian Democratic Party | SDS | 2,960 | 3,672 | 5,266 | 3,533 | 3,730 | 6,182 | 2,662 | 3,052 | 4,252 | 4,184 | 2,570 | 42,063 | 31.54% | 3 | 1 | 4 |
| Social Democrats | SD | 2,976 | 6,076 | 5,273 | 4,817 | 4,478 | 3,278 | 2,571 | 2,762 | 3,367 | 1,964 | 2,038 | 39,600 | 29.69% | 3 | 1 | 4 |
| Zares | | 358 | 1,432 | 1,581 | 1,566 | 1,452 | 1,147 | 742 | 1,045 | 1,366 | 476 | 546 | 11,711 | 8.78% | 1 | 0 | 1 |
| Democratic Party of Pensioners of Slovenia | DeSUS | 375 | 972 | 1,574 | 878 | 937 | 952 | 825 | 729 | 764 | 385 | 502 | 8,893 | 6.67% | 0 | 1 | 1 |
| Liberal Democracy of Slovenia | LDS | 328 | 812 | 921 | 504 | 619 | 428 | 527 | 1,016 | 497 | 224 | 1,471 | 7,347 | 5.51% | 0 | 1 | 1 |
| Slovenian National Party | SNS | 405 | 724 | 966 | 526 | 609 | 857 | 475 | 602 | 475 | 426 | 340 | 6,405 | 4.80% | 0 | 0 | 0 |
| Slovenian People's Party and Youth Party of Slovenia | SLS-SMS | 846 | 271 | 420 | 245 | 319 | 1,429 | 155 | 146 | 473 | 1,679 | 101 | 6,084 | 4.56% | 0 | 0 | 0 |
| New Slovenia – Christian People's Party | NSi | 273 | 410 | 1,452 | 464 | 396 | 585 | 337 | 396 | 809 | 605 | 203 | 5,930 | 4.45% | 0 | 0 | 0 |
| Lipa | | 127 | 268 | 265 | 215 | 217 | 188 | 126 | 151 | 174 | 100 | 98 | 1,929 | 1.45% | 0 | 0 | 0 |
| List for Clear Drinking Water | LZČPV | 46 | 77 | 133 | 82 | 72 | 110 | 41 | 88 | 64 | 45 | 38 | 796 | 0.60% | 0 | 0 | 0 |
| Greens of Slovenia | ZS | 35 | 65 | 80 | 78 | 66 | 84 | 65 | 94 | 49 | 42 | 35 | 693 | 0.52% | 0 | 0 | 0 |
| List for Justice and Development | LPR | 21 | 59 | 23 | 94 | 76 | 35 | 192 | 26 | 99 | 18 | 22 | 665 | 0.50% | 0 | 0 | 0 |
| Christian Democratic Party | SKD | 27 | 60 | 54 | 41 | 34 | 55 | 48 | 42 | 108 | 61 | 28 | 558 | 0.42% | 0 | 0 | 0 |
| Green Coalition: Green Party and Green Progress | ZL-ZP | 16 | 25 | 46 | 25 | 29 | 32 | 39 | 26 | 23 | 18 | 24 | 303 | 0.23% | 0 | 0 | 0 |
| Party of Slovenian People | SSN | 24 | 37 | 24 | 15 | 38 | 38 | 15 | 29 | 24 | 16 | 13 | 273 | 0.20% | 0 | 0 | 0 |
| Forward Slovenia | NPS | 0 | 42 | 0 | 13 | 16 | 16 | 12 | 0 | 13 | 4 | 18 | 134 | 0.10% | 0 | 0 | 0 |
| Valid votes | | 8,817 | 15,002 | 18,078 | 13,096 | 13,088 | 15,416 | 8,832 | 10,204 | 12,557 | 10,247 | 8,047 | 133,384 | 100.00% | 7 | 4 | 11 |
| Rejected votes | | 206 | 318 | 298 | 213 | 206 | 312 | 149 | 194 | 217 | 179 | 208 | 2,500 | 1.84% | | | |
| Total polled | | 9,023 | 15,320 | 18,376 | 13,309 | 13,294 | 15,728 | 8,981 | 10,398 | 12,774 | 10,426 | 8,255 | 135,884 | 65.54% | | | |
| Registered electors | | 14,048 | 26,884 | 26,919 | 20,588 | 20,625 | 22,403 | 13,886 | 15,871 | 18,336 | 14,951 | 12,829 | 207,340 | | | | |
| Turnout | | 64.23% | 56.99% | 68.26% | 64.64% | 64.46% | 70.20% | 64.68% | 65.52% | 69.67% | 69.73% | 64.35% | 65.54% | | | | |

The following candidates were elected:

- Constituency seats - Milan Čadež (SDS, Škofja Loka 2), 4,184 votes; Branko Grims (SDS, Kranj 3), 6,182 votes; Darja Lavtižar Bebler (SD, Kranj 1), 4,817 votes; Tomaž Tom Mencinger (SD, Jesenice), 6,076 votes; Damijan Perne (Zares, Kranj 1), 1,566 votes; Aleksander Ravnikar (SD, Kranj 2), 4,478 votes; and Milenko Ziherl (SDS, Škofja Loka 1), 4,252 votes.
- National seats - Samo Bevk (SD, Idrija), 2,976 votes; Rado Likar (SDS, Idrija), 2,960 votes; Borut Sajovic (LDS, Tržič), 1,471 votes; and Anton Urh (DeSUS, Radovljica 1), 825 votes.

Substitutions:

- Aleksander Ravnikar (SD, Kranj 2) died on 8 July 2009 and was replaced by Julijana Bizjak Mlakar (SD, Kamnik) on 15 July 2009.
- Damijan Perne (Zares, Kranj 1) forfeited his seat on 14 December 2009 upon being appointed director of the Begunje Psychiatric Hospital and was replaced by Lojz Potočnik ((Zares, Kranj 2) on 17 December 2009.

===== 2004 =====
Results of the 2004 parliamentary election held on 3 October 2004:

| Party | | Votes per electoral district | | | | | | | | | | | Total votes | % | Seats | | |
| Party | | Idrija | Jese- nice | Kamnik | Kranj 1 | Kranj 2 | Kranj 3 | Rado- vljica 1 | Rado- vljica 2 | Škofja Loka 1 | Škofja Loka 2 | Tržič | Total votes | % | Con. | Nat. | Tot. |
|---|---|---|---|---|---|---|---|---|---|---|---|---|---|---|---|---|---|
| Slovenian Democratic Party | SDS | 2,117 | 3,763 | 5,053 | 3,588 | 3,717 | 5,219 | 2,399 | 2,787 | 3,669 | 3,526 | 3,079 | 38,917 | 31.28% | 3 | 2 | 5 |
| Liberal Democracy of Slovenia | LDS | 1,100 | 3,473 | 3,705 | 3,302 | 3,162 | 2,337 | 1,992 | 2,354 | 2,607 | 1,450 | 2,158 | 27,640 | 22.22% | 2 | 1 | 3 |
| United List of Social Democrats | ZLSD | 1,816 | 2,188 | 1,321 | 1,388 | 1,279 | 1,086 | 847 | 988 | 849 | 706 | 545 | 13,013 | 10.46% | 1 | 0 | 1 |
| New Slovenia – Christian People's Party | NSi | 750 | 1,088 | 1,489 | 1,125 | 1,009 | 1,454 | 818 | 1,090 | 1,590 | 1,191 | 673 | 12,277 | 9.87% | 1 | 0 | 1 |
| Slovenian People's Party | SLS | 1,506 | 432 | 1,230 | 354 | 469 | 2,222 | 384 | 213 | 1,118 | 1,808 | 283 | 10,019 | 8.05% | 0 | 1 | 1 |
| Slovenian National Party | SNS | 311 | 692 | 670 | 743 | 734 | 635 | 488 | 527 | 419 | 267 | 294 | 5,780 | 4.65% | 0 | 0 | 0 |
| Active Slovenia | AS | 197 | 332 | 582 | 533 | 538 | 511 | 869 | 274 | 298 | 264 | 196 | 4,594 | 3.69% | 0 | 0 | 0 |
| Democratic Party of Pensioners of Slovenia | DeSUS | 128 | 374 | 736 | 281 | 284 | 321 | 215 | 232 | 244 | 191 | 159 | 3,165 | 2.54% | 0 | 0 | 0 |
| Slovenia is Ours | SN | 269 | 128 | 199 | 149 | 181 | 211 | 113 | 296 | 171 | 85 | 92 | 1,894 | 1.52% | 0 | 0 | 0 |
| Youth Party of Slovenia | SMS | 134 | 287 | 256 | 171 | 165 | 214 | 149 | 175 | 161 | 87 | 92 | 1,891 | 1.52% | 0 | 0 | 0 |
| June List | JL | 58 | 157 | 189 | 114 | 139 | 152 | 82 | 126 | 132 | 27 | 65 | 1,241 | 1.00% | 0 | 0 | 0 |
| Greens of Slovenia | ZS | 20 | 105 | 156 | 76 | 71 | 66 | 198 | 70 | 63 | 34 | 31 | 890 | 0.72% | 0 | 0 | 0 |
| List for Enterprising Slovenia | PS | 74 | 55 | 164 | 43 | 48 | 45 | 151 | 113 | 107 | 77 | 8 | 885 | 0.71% | 0 | 0 | 0 |
| Women's Voice of Slovenia, Association for Primorska, Union of Independents of Slovenia and New Democracy of Slovenia | GZS- ZZP- ZNS- NDS | 56 | 111 | 34 | 55 | 81 | 63 | 36 | 81 | 87 | 34 | 23 | 661 | 0.53% | 0 | 0 | 0 |
| Party of Ecological; Movements of Slovenia | SEG | 26 | 70 | 55 | 45 | 64 | 61 | 59 | 55 | 63 | 22 | 49 | 569 | 0.46% | 0 | 0 | 0 |
| Democratic Party of Slovenia | DS | 0 | 64 | 41 | 27 | 36 | 18 | 22 | 22 | 0 | 15 | 0 | 245 | 0.20% | 0 | 0 | 0 |
| Forward Slovenia | NPS | 25 | 59 | 25 | 15 | 17 | 17 | 26 | 7 | 7 | 11 | 23 | 232 | 0.19% | 0 | 0 | 0 |
| Party of Slovenian People | SSN | 10 | 28 | 29 | 17 | 14 | 22 | 17 | 14 | 13 | 8 | 13 | 185 | 0.15% | 0 | 0 | 0 |
| Social Liberal Party | LS | 5 | 4 | 11 | 47 | 55 | 9 | 10 | 8 | 10 | 5 | 5 | 169 | 0.14% | 0 | 0 | 0 |
| United for an Independent and Just Slovenia | | 1 | 25 | 34 | 5 | 16 | 7 | 4 | 5 | 18 | 4 | 19 | 138 | 0.11% | 0 | 0 | 0 |
| Valid votes | | 8,603 | 13,435 | 15,979 | 12,078 | 12,079 | 14,670 | 8,879 | 9,437 | 11,626 | 9,812 | 7,807 | 124,405 | 100.00% | 7 | 4 | 11 |
| Rejected votes | | 216 | 451 | 341 | 255 | 287 | 312 | 322 | 277 | 283 | 200 | 210 | 3,154 | 2.47% | | | |
| Total polled | | 8,819 | 13,886 | 16,320 | 12,333 | 12,366 | 14,982 | 9,201 | 9,714 | 11,909 | 10,012 | 8,017 | 127,559 | 64.08% | | | |
| Registered electors | | 13,805 | 25,957 | 25,017 | 19,912 | 20,037 | 21,226 | 13,479 | 15,167 | 17,631 | 14,400 | 12,435 | 199,066 | | | | |
| Turnout | | 63.88% | 53.50% | 65.24% | 61.94% | 61.72% | 70.58% | 68.26% | 64.05% | 67.55% | 69.53% | 64.47% | 64.08% | | | | |

The following candidates were elected:

- Constituency seats - Samo Bevk (ZLSD, Idrija), 1,816 votes; Branko Grims (SDS, Kranj 3), 5,219 votes; Anton Kokalj (NSi, Škofja Loka), 1,590 votes; Matej Lahovnik (LDS, Kranj 1), 3,302 votes; Pavel Rupar (SDS, Tržič), 3,079 votes; Borut Sajovic (LDS, Tržič), 2,158 votes; and Bojan Starman (SDS, Škofja Loka 2), 3,526 votes.
- National seats - Darja Lavtižar Bebler (LDS, Jesenice), 3,473 votes; Mihael Prevc (SLS, Škofja Loka 2), 1,808 votes; Rudi Veršnik (SDS, Kamnik), 5,053 votes; and Milenko Ziherl (SDS, Škofja Loka 1), 3,669 votes.

Substitutions:

- Pavel Rupar (SDS, Tržič) resigned on 23 October 2006 and was replaced by Bojan Homan (SDS, Kranj 2) on 25 October 2006.

===== 2000 =====
Results of the 2000 parliamentary election held on 15 October 2000:

| Party | | Votes per electoral district | | | | | | | | | | | Total votes | % | Seats | | |
| Party | | Idrija | Jese- nice | Kamnik | Kranj 1 | Kranj 2 | Kranj 3 | Rado- vljica 1 | Rado- vljica 2 | Škofja Loka 1 | Škofja Loka 2 | Tržič | Total votes | % | Con. | Nat. | Tot. |
|---|---|---|---|---|---|---|---|---|---|---|---|---|---|---|---|---|---|
| Liberal Democracy of Slovenia | LDS | 2,246 | 5,327 | 5,918 | 5,140 | 5,140 | 4,192 | 3,493 | 3,181 | 3,765 | 2,771 | 2,719 | 43,892 | 31.89% | 3 | 1 | 4 |
| Social Democratic Party of Slovenia | SDSS | 1,250 | 2,337 | 2,852 | 2,277 | 2,424 | 4,468 | 1,359 | 1,617 | 1,908 | 2,297 | 2,714 | 25,503 | 18.53% | 2 | 0 | 2 |
| United List of Social Democrats | ZLSD | 2,116 | 3,364 | 1,308 | 1,794 | 1,506 | 1,105 | 1,242 | 2,030 | 946 | 1,002 | 1,026 | 17,439 | 12.67% | 1 | 0 | 1 |
| New Slovenia – Christian People's Party | NSi | 635 | 1,500 | 2,118 | 1,234 | 1,198 | 1,876 | 1,132 | 1,354 | 1,470 | 2,734 | 554 | 15,805 | 11.48% | 1 | 1 | 2 |
| Slovenian People's Party and Slovene Christian Democrats | SLS-SKD | 2,036 | 550 | 2,173 | 673 | 688 | 1,468 | 746 | 349 | 1,315 | 1,788 | 521 | 12,307 | 8.94% | 1 | 0 | 1 |
| Youth Party of Slovenia | SMS | 429 | 949 | 903 | 836 | 754 | 852 | 567 | 623 | 526 | 422 | 343 | 7,204 | 5.23% | 0 | 1 | 1 |
| Democratic Party of Pensioners of Slovenia | DeSUS | 212 | 557 | 459 | 564 | 496 | 418 | 375 | 403 | 394 | 436 | 342 | 4,656 | 3.38% | 0 | 0 | 0 |
| Slovenian National Party | SNS | 244 | 525 | 480 | 569 | 546 | 416 | 291 | 360 | 328 | 217 | 266 | 4,242 | 3.08% | 0 | 0 | 0 |
| Women's Voice of Slovenia | GŽS | 104 | 264 | 209 | 184 | 181 | 165 | 154 | 142 | 150 | 114 | 91 | 1,758 | 1.28% | 0 | 0 | 0 |
| Greens of Slovenia | ZS | 57 | 161 | 253 | 173 | 138 | 93 | 96 | 110 | 87 | 48 | 116 | 1,332 | 0.97% | 0 | 0 | 0 |
| Democratic Party of Slovenia | DS | 51 | 123 | 148 | 65 | 90 | 123 | 131 | 101 | 60 | 101 | 16 | 1,009 | 0.73% | 0 | 0 | 0 |
| Party of Democratic Action of Slovenia | SDAS | 19 | 454 | 78 | 103 | 112 | 40 | 28 | 71 | 37 | 17 | 44 | 1,003 | 0.73% | 0 | 0 | 0 |
| Movement for Human Rights | GČP | 37 | 91 | 63 | 51 | 53 | 60 | 35 | 57 | 34 | 35 | 56 | 572 | 0.42% | 0 | 0 | 0 |
| New Party | NS | 41 | 66 | 70 | 49 | 55 | 85 | 24 | 26 | 40 | 64 | 16 | 536 | 0.39% | 0 | 0 | 0 |
| Forward Slovenia | NPS | 23 | 54 | 57 | 31 | 40 | 35 | 12 | 37 | 29 | 38 | 14 | 370 | 0.27% | 0 | 0 | 0 |
| Valid votes | | 9,500 | 16,322 | 17,089 | 13,743 | 13,421 | 15,396 | 9,685 | 10,461 | 11,089 | 12,084 | 8,838 | 137,628 | 100.00% | 8 | 3 | 11 |
| Rejected votes | | 468 | 884 | 585 | 425 | 447 | 607 | 343 | 491 | 385 | 421 | 326 | 5,382 | 3.76% | | | |
| Total polled | | 9,968 | 17,206 | 17,674 | 14,168 | 13,868 | 16,003 | 10,028 | 10,952 | 11,474 | 12,505 | 9,164 | 143,010 | 74.50% | | | |
| Registered electors | | 13,544 | 25,073 | 23,718 | 19,360 | 19,453 | 20,102 | 13,209 | 14,678 | 14,904 | 15,722 | 12,201 | 191,964 | | | | |
| Turnout | | 73.60% | 68.62% | 74.52% | 73.18% | 71.29% | 79.61% | 75.92% | 74.62% | 76.99% | 79.54% | 75.11% | 74.50% | | | | |

The following candidates were elected:

- Constituency seats - Andrej Bajuk (NSi); Samo Bevk (ZLSD); Franc Čebulj (SDSS); Jelko Kacin (LDS); Maksimiljan Lavrinc (LDS); Janez Podobnik (SLS-SKD); Pavel Rupar (SDSS); and Dušan Vučko (LDS).
- National seats - Jože Bernik (NSi); Blaž Kavčič (LDS); and Bogomir Vnučec (SMS).

Substitutions:

- Jelko Kacin (LDS) forfeited his seat on 1 July 2004 upon being elected to the European Parliament and was replaced by Darja Lavtižar Bebler (LDS) on 22 July 2004.

==== 1990s ====
===== 1996 =====
Results of the 1996 parliamentary election held on 10 November 1996:

| Party | | Votes per electoral district | | | | | | | | | | | Total votes | % | Seats | | |
| Party | | Idrija | Jese- nice | Kamnik | Kranj 1 | Kranj 2 | Kranj 3 | Rado- vljica 1 | Rado- vljica 2 | Škofja Loka 1 | Škofja Loka 2 | Tržič | Total votes | % | Con. | Nat. | Tot. |
|---|---|---|---|---|---|---|---|---|---|---|---|---|---|---|---|---|---|
| Liberal Democracy of Slovenia | LDS | 1,881 | 4,965 | 4,606 | 4,369 | 4,179 | 2,963 | 2,360 | 2,541 | 3,155 | 2,212 | 1,969 | 35,200 | 25.76% | 2 | 1 | 3 |
| Slovenian People's Party | SLS | 4,003 | 2,021 | 3,612 | 1,437 | 1,944 | 2,587 | 1,560 | 1,444 | 2,328 | 3,866 | 1,347 | 26,149 | 19.14% | 2 | 0 | 2 |
| Social Democratic Party of Slovenia | SDSS | 957 | 3,230 | 2,793 | 2,493 | 2,450 | 4,459 | 1,399 | 1,865 | 1,882 | 2,112 | 2,268 | 25,908 | 18.96% | 2 | 0 | 2 |
| Slovene Christian Democrats | SKD | 716 | 1,348 | 1,868 | 1,272 | 1,250 | 1,791 | 1,166 | 1,261 | 1,387 | 1,873 | 652 | 14,584 | 10.67% | 1 | 0 | 1 |
| United List of Social Democrats | ZLSD | 1,483 | 2,035 | 796 | 1,333 | 1,471 | 864 | 951 | 1,108 | 610 | 553 | 762 | 11,966 | 8.76% | 0 | 1 | 1 |
| Democratic Party of Slovenia | DS | 175 | 464 | 599 | 538 | 512 | 356 | 440 | 394 | 352 | 257 | 307 | 4,394 | 3.22% | 0 | 0 | 0 |
| Slovenian National Party | SNS | 276 | 698 | 446 | 369 | 367 | 300 | 470 | 646 | 339 | 259 | 192 | 4,362 | 3.19% | 0 | 0 | 0 |
| Greens of Slovenia | ZS | 103 | 209 | 642 | 298 | 232 | 279 | 178 | 177 | 248 | 118 | 203 | 2,687 | 1.97% | 0 | 0 | 0 |
| Liberal Party | LS | 77 | 121 | 91 | 1,026 | 233 | 686 | 86 | 81 | 122 | 77 | 82 | 2,682 | 1.96% | 0 | 0 | 0 |
| Democratic Party of Pensioners of Slovenia | DeSUS | 0 | 296 | 365 | 277 | 257 | 259 | 197 | 250 | 133 | 159 | 115 | 2,308 | 1.69% | 0 | 0 | 0 |
| Slovenian Craftsmen and Entrepreneurial; Party and Centrum Party | SOPS | 115 | 285 | 135 | 72 | 91 | 83 | 138 | 84 | 77 | 102 | 53 | 1,235 | 0.90% | 0 | 0 | 0 |
| Communist Party of Slovenia | KPS | 61 | 175 | 98 | 102 | 106 | 62 | 73 | 83 | 98 | 55 | 63 | 976 | 0.71% | 0 | 0 | 0 |
| Slovenian Forum | SF | 74 | 99 | 115 | 85 | 64 | 50 | 71 | 136 | 73 | 77 | 80 | 924 | 0.68% | 0 | 0 | 0 |
| Green Alternative of Slovenia | ZA | 48 | 111 | 107 | 56 | 79 | 45 | 47 | 42 | 39 | 31 | 31 | 636 | 0.47% | 0 | 0 | 0 |
| National Labour Party | NSD | 26 | 165 | 76 | 29 | 59 | 61 | 50 | 33 | 24 | 30 | 20 | 573 | 0.42% | 0 | 0 | 0 |
| Slovenian National Right | SND | 25 | 108 | 60 | 50 | 80 | 49 | 29 | 29 | 17 | 26 | 43 | 516 | 0.38% | 0 | 0 | 0 |
| Republican Association of Slovenia | RZS | 28 | 94 | 51 | 21 | 44 | 26 | 51 | 27 | 55 | 37 | 34 | 468 | 0.34% | 0 | 0 | 0 |
| Christian Social Union | KSU | 43 | 42 | 39 | 22 | 83 | 34 | 31 | 41 | 11 | 46 | 12 | 404 | 0.30% | 0 | 0 | 0 |
| Kristjan Verbič (Independent) | Ind | 26 | 32 | 27 | 23 | 24 | 29 | 23 | 28 | 17 | 19 | 131 | 379 | 0.28% | 0 | 0 | 0 |
| Patriotic United Retirement Party and League for Slovenia | DEUS-LZS | 0 | 90 | 0 | 93 | 90 | 0 | 0 | 0 | 0 | 0 | 0 | 273 | 0.20% | 0 | 0 | 0 |
| Valid votes | | 10,117 | 16,588 | 16,526 | 13,965 | 13,615 | 14,983 | 9,320 | 10,270 | 10,967 | 11,909 | 8,364 | 136,624 | 100.00% | 7 | 2 | 9 |
| Rejected votes | | | | | | | | | | | | | 9,022 | 6.19% | | | |
| Total polled | | | | | | | | | | | | | 145,646 | 78.03% | | | |
| Registered electors | | | | | | | | | | | | | 186,653 | | | | |
| Turnout | | | | | | | | | | | | | 78.03% | | | | |

The following candidates were elected:

- Constituency seats - Franc Čebulj (SDSS); Vincencij Demšar (SKD); Jelko Kacin (LDS); Darja Lavtižar Bebler (LDS); Jože Možgan (SLS); Janez Podobnik (SLS); and Pavel Rupar (SDSS).
- National seats - Samo Bevk (ZLSD); and Zoran Thaler (LDS).

Substitutions:

- Zoran Thaler (LDS) forfeited his seat on 27 February 1997 upon being elected to the government and was replaced by Maks Lavrinc (LDS) on 25 March 1997.
- Maks Lavrinc (LDS) forfeited his seat on 25 September 1997 when Zoran Thaler (LDS) left his government position, regaining his seat.
- Zoran Thaler (LDS) resigned on 25 September 1997 and was replaced by Maks Lavrinc (LDS) on 8 October 1997.

===== 1992 =====
Results of the 1992 parliamentary election held on 6 December 1992:

| Party | | Votes | % | Seats | | |
| Party | | Votes | % | Con. | Nat. | Tot. |
|---|---|---|---|---|---|---|
| Liberal Democracy of Slovenia | LDS | 31,405 | 21.11% | 2 | 0 | 2 |
| Slovene Christian Democrats | SKD | 23,847 | 16.03% | 1 | 1 | 2 |
| Slovenian National Party | SNS | 23,051 | 15.50% | 1 | 1 | 2 |
| United List | ZL | 18,203 | 12.24% | 1 | 0 | 1 |
| Slovenian People's Party | SLS | 12,657 | 8.51% | 0 | 1 | 1 |
| Democratic Party of Slovenia | DS | 7,184 | 4.83% | 0 | 0 | 0 |
| Social Democratic Party of Slovenia | SDSS | 4,701 | 3.16% | 0 | 0 | 0 |
| Greens of Slovenia | ZS | 4,510 | 3.03% | 0 | 0 | 0 |
| Liberal Party | LS | 3,573 | 2.40% | 0 | 0 | 0 |
| Socialist Party of Slovenia | SSS | 3,570 | 2.40% | 0 | 0 | 0 |
| National Democratic Party and Slovenian Party | ND-SGS | 3,504 | 2.36% | 0 | 0 | 0 |
| Independent Party | SN | 2,752 | 1.85% | 0 | 0 | 0 |
| Movement for General Democracy | GOD | 1,931 | 1.30% | 0 | 0 | 0 |
| Slovenian Craftsmen and Entrepreneurial; Party and Centrum Party | SOPS | 1,931 | 1.30% | 0 | 0 | 0 |
| Liberal Democratic Party of Slovenia | LDSS | 1,772 | 1.19% | 0 | 0 | 0 |
| Christian Socialists, DS Forward and Free Party | KS-DS | 1,077 | 0.72% | 0 | 0 | 0 |
| DEMOS | DEMOS | 1,024 | 0.69% | 0 | 0 | 0 |
| “SMER" Association of Slovenia | SMER | 750 | 0.50% | 0 | 0 | 0 |
| Slovenian Ecological Movement | SEG | 675 | 0.45% | 0 | 0 | 0 |
| Republican Association of Slovenia | RZS | 403 | 0.27% | 0 | 0 | 0 |
| Primorska Association | ZZP | 236 | 0.16% | 0 | 0 | 0 |
| Valid votes | | 148,756 | 100.00% | 5 | 3 | 8 |
| Rejected votes | | 10,094 | 6.35% | | | |
| Total polled | | 158,850 | 90.09% | | | |
| Registered electors | | 176,319 | | | | |

The following candidates were elected:

- Constituency seats - Dušan Bavdek (ZL); Maksimiljan Lavrinc (LDS); Štefan Matuš (SNS); Ignac Polajnar (SKD); and Zoran Thaler (LDS).
- National seats - Brane Eržen (SNS); Janez Podobnik (SLS); and Ivan Oman (SKD).
