= Srednja Vas–Goriče =

Srednja Vas–Goriče Srednja Vas (until 1953)
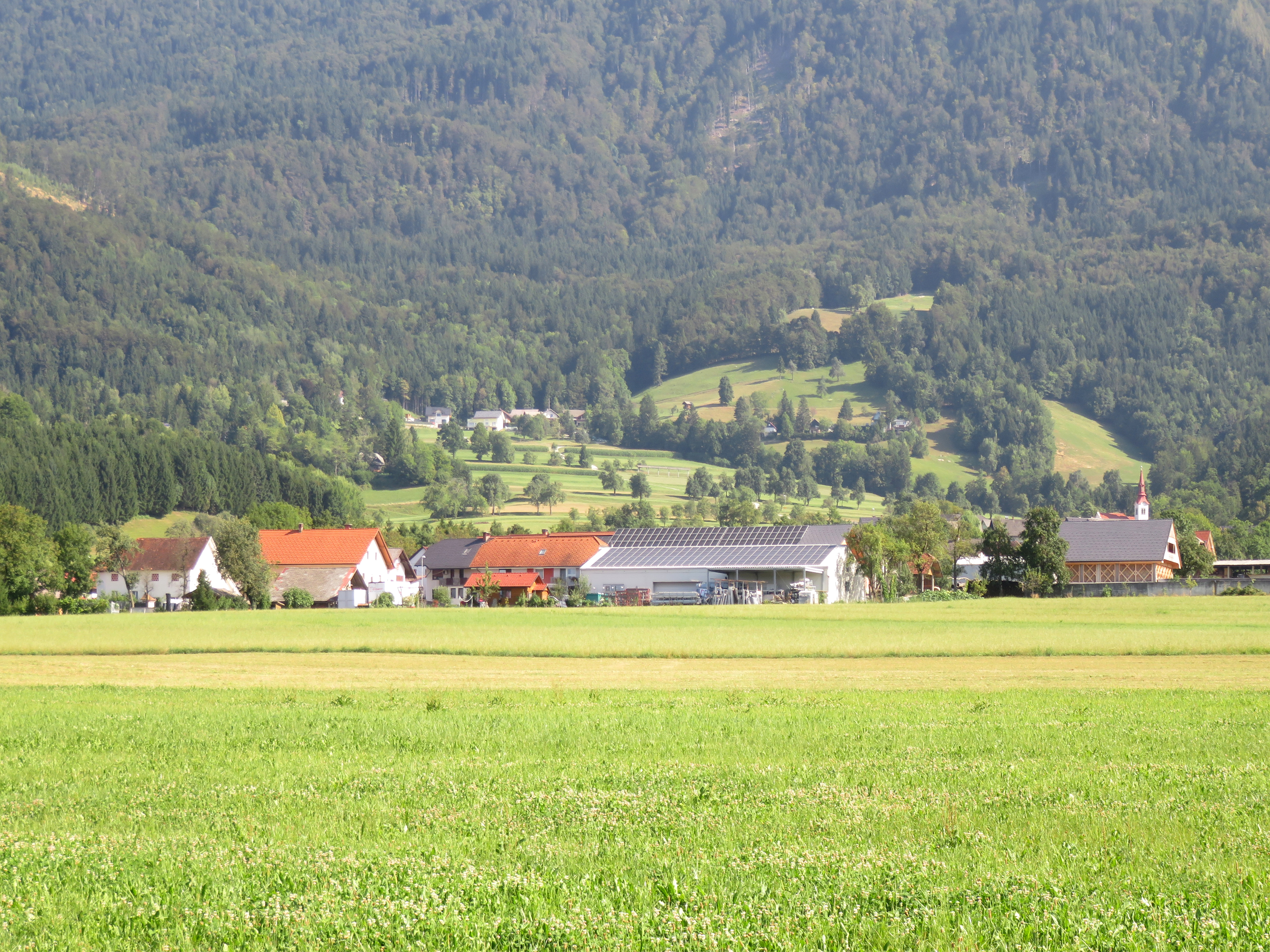

- Location in Slovenia
- Coordinates: 46°19′17.18″N 14°21′0.64″E
- Country: Slovenia
- Traditional region: Upper Carniola
- Statistical region: Upper Carniola
- Municipality: Kranj

Area
  - Total: 0.82 km^{2} (0.32 sq mi)
- Elevation: 490.9 m (1,611 ft)

Population (2012)
  - Total: 80
  - Density: 98/km^{2} (250/sq mi)

Srednja Vas–Goriče (pronounced [ˈsɾeːdnja ˈʋaːs ɡɔˈɾiːtʃɛ]; Slovene: Srednja vas - Goriče, German: Srednawas) is a settlement near Golnik in the Municipality of Kranj in the Upper Carniola region of Slovenia.

== Name ==
The name of the settlement was changed from Srednja vas to Srednja vas - Goriče in 1953. In the past the German name was Srednawas.

== Cultural heritage ==
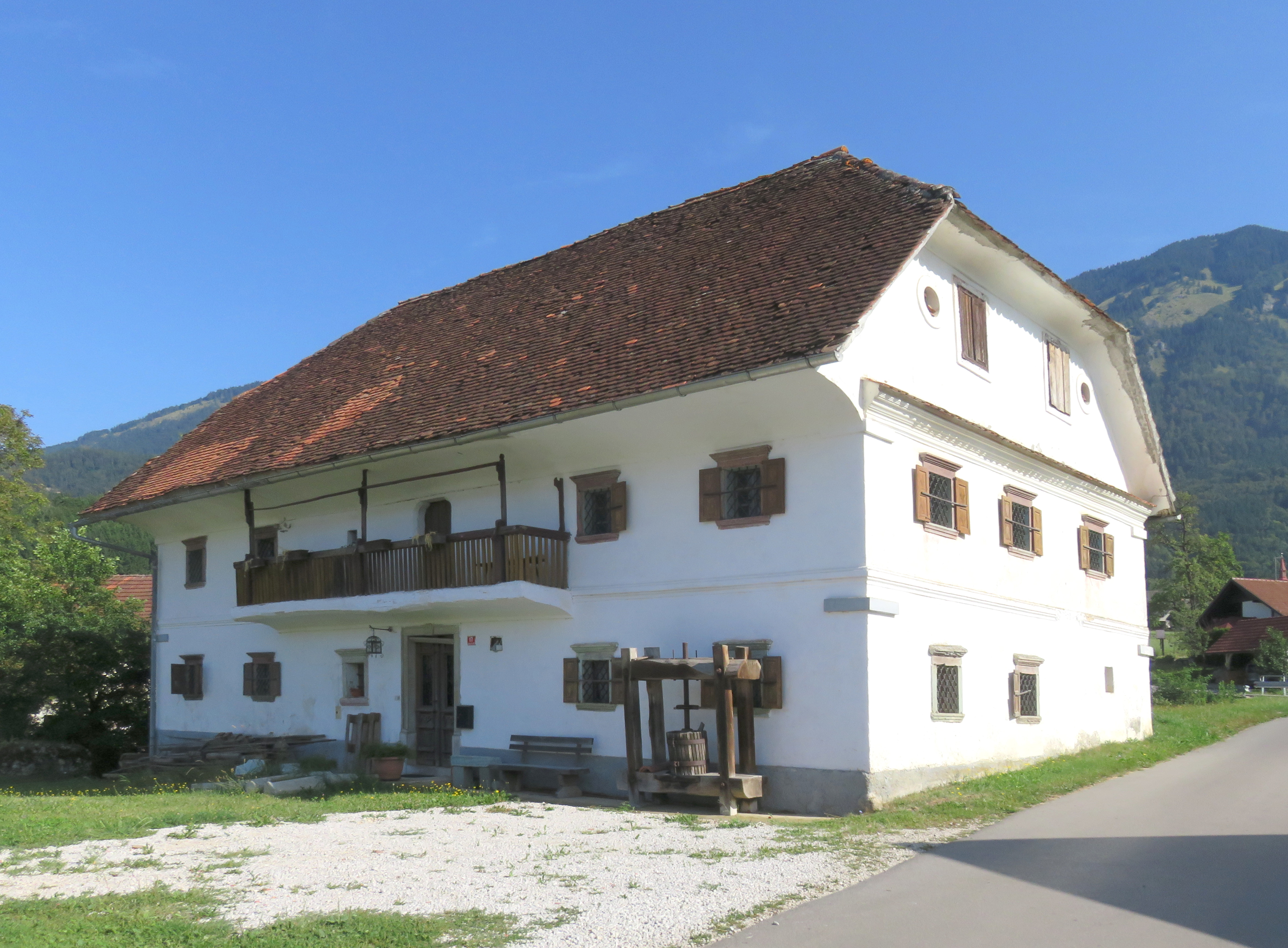
The Crk farm (Pr' Crku)

The house at the Crk farm (Slovene: Pr' Crku) at no. 17 in Srednja Vas–Goriče is registered as cultural heritage. It is a two-story manor house with a half-hip roof, window frames carved from tuff, cast-iron window gratings, and a balcony, dating from the mid-19th century and standing along the road from Goriče to Zalog. In addition to the house, the farm consists of a barn, a pigsty, a granary, a woodshed, other outbuildings, and an orchard.
