= Kamnjek =

- Location in Slovenia
- Coordinates: 46°18′33.36″N 14°19′41.45″E
- Country: Slovenia
- Traditional region: Upper Carniola
- Statistical region: Upper Carniola
- Municipality: Kranj
- Elevation: 428 m (1,404 ft)

Kamnjek (pronounced [ˈkaːmnjɛk]; German: Kamnik) is a former settlement in the Municipality of Kranj in the Upper Carniola region of Slovenia. It now a hamlet of the village of Letenice. It lies west of the village center of Letenice, in a small damp valley on a road leading into the east side of the Udin Woods (Slovene: Udin boršt).

== Name ==
Like similar names (e.g., Kamnik, Kamenik, Kamnje, Kamno, etc.), the name Kamnjek is ultimately derived from the Slavic common noun *kamy (accusative: *kamenь) 'stone', referring to the local geography. In the past the German name was Kamnik.

== History ==
Kamnjek was merged with the village of Letenice in 1953, ending its existence as a separate settlement.
