= Žan Mahnič =

Slovenian politician (born 1990)

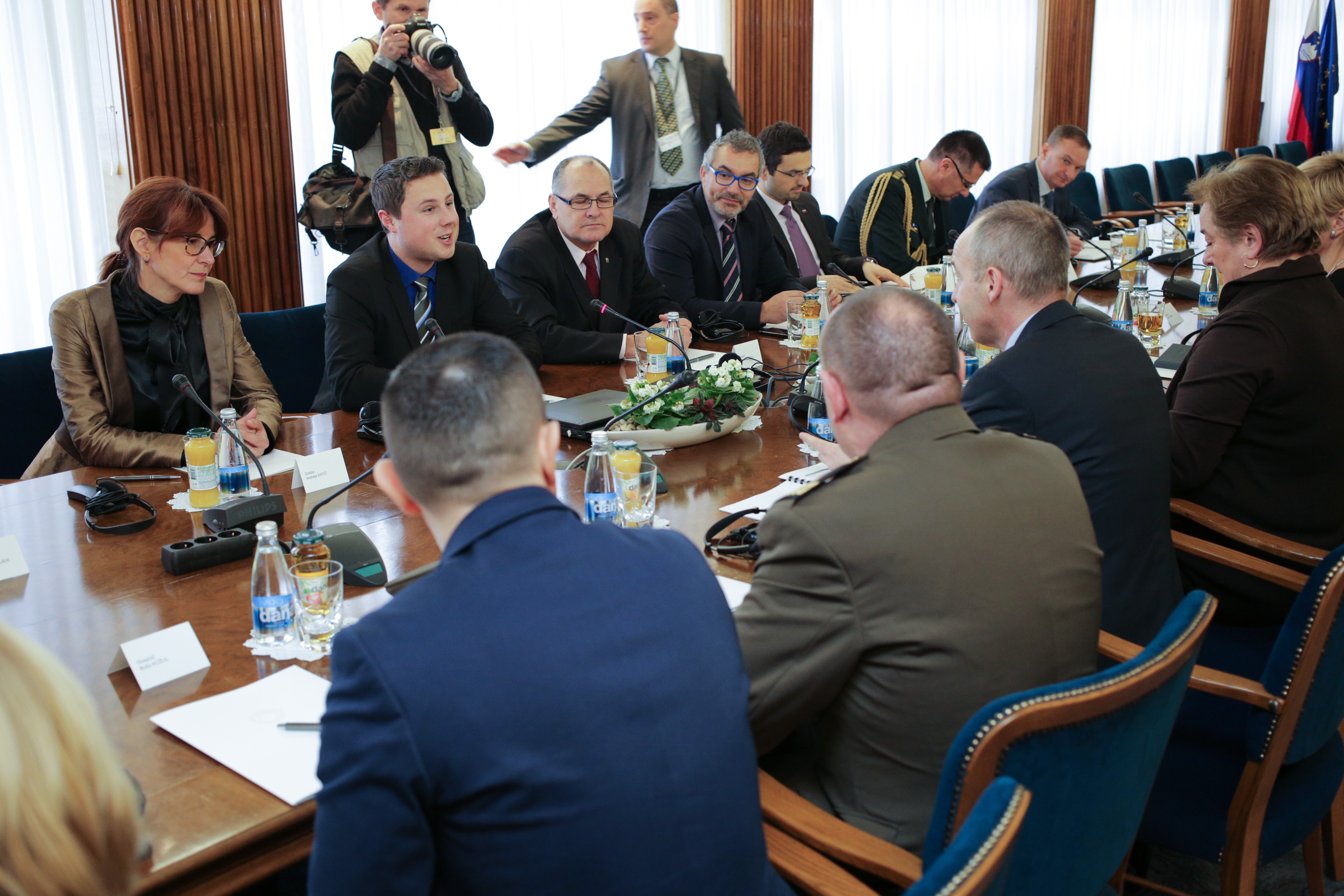
- Mahnič in 2017

State Secretary for National Security
- In office 3 March 2020 – 1 June 2022
- Prime Minister: Janez Janša
- Preceded by: Damir Črnčec
- Succeeded by: Andrej Benedejčič

Leader of the Slovenian Democratic Youth
- In office 31 January 2015 – 23 January 2021
- Preceded by: Andrej Čuš
- Succeeded by: Dominik Štrakl

Member of the National Assembly
- Incumbent
- Assumed office 9 June 2022
- Preceded by: Jure Ferjan
- Constituency: Kranj – Škofja Loka II
- In office 1 August 2014 – 3 March 2020
- Succeeded by: Jure Ferjan
- Constituency: Kranj – Škofja Loka II

Personal details
- Born: 12 January 1990 (age 36)
- Party: Slovenian Democratic Party (since 2008)

Žan Mahnič (born 12 January 1990) is a Slovenian politician of the Slovenian Democratic Party. Since 2014, he has been a member of the National Assembly. From 2020 to 2022, he served as state secretary for national security. From 2015 to 2021, he was the leader of the Slovenian Democratic Youth.
