= Pavel Rupar =

Slovenian politician (born 1960)

Member of the National Assembly
- In office 1993 – 12 October 2006
- Constituency: Tržič

Personal details
- Born: 21 May 1960 (age 65) Tržič, PR Slovenia, Yugoslavia
- Party: Independent (since 2026)
- Other political affiliations: SDS (until 2013); SLS (2018–2022); Pavel Rupar's Voice of Pensioners (2024–2026)

Pavel Rupar (born 21 May 1960) is a Slovenian politician. He is a former mayor of the Municipality of Tržič and a former Member of Parliament of the Slovenian Democratic Party (SDS). He is the president of the Pavel Rupar's Voice of Pensioners party, founded in January 2024.

== Life ==
By education he is an electrical technician. He first worked at Iskra, and later opened a private shop in Tržič.

He became actively involved in politics in 1994 and was elected mayor of the Municipality of Tržič that year. From 1996 he served as an MP for SDS until 12 October 2006, when he resigned in order to relieve the investigation into an affair involving a subtenant, in which it was determined that he had failed to report ownership information about two apartments to the Commission for the Prevention of Corruption of the Republic of Slovenia. The party supported his resignation. He thus became the first MP to resign from the position due to an investigation of suspected criminal activity.

In those years several criminal complaints were filed against him for abuse of office and damage to the municipal budget; in four cases he received suspended sentences and was ordered to return unlawfully obtained assets. In October 2012 the court also sentenced him to a prison term for the first time. A year later the first-instance ruling was confirmed by the Higher Court in Ljubljana, making it final. Earlier, in August 2013, Rupar left the SDS party, without publicly disclosing the reasons.

In 2018 he returned to politics and ran again for mayor in the local elections, this time as an independent candidate, but lost in the second round to Borut Sajovic. Later that year he became a member of the Slovenian People's Party (SLS).

In February 2023, together with the civil initiative Voice of Pensioners of Slovenia, he organized a protest rally of pensioners in front of the National Assembly. A second rally took place on 1 March and a third on 31 March. Regular monthly rallies were also held on 3 May, 31 May, 6 September, 18 October, when those gathered also voted by show of hands to establish a new pensioners’ party, and 1 December. At the end of June 2023 the initiative also visited Brussels, where they were received by Members of the European Parliament Milan Zver and Romana Tomc.

On 20 January 2024, at the founding congress of the new party Voice of Pensioners in Ljubljana, he was elected president of the party.
