= Kamenik =

Kamenik refers to the following places:

- Kamenik, Bulgaria
- Kamenik, Slovenia
- Kamenik, Montenegro
