= Goriče, Kranj =

Goriče
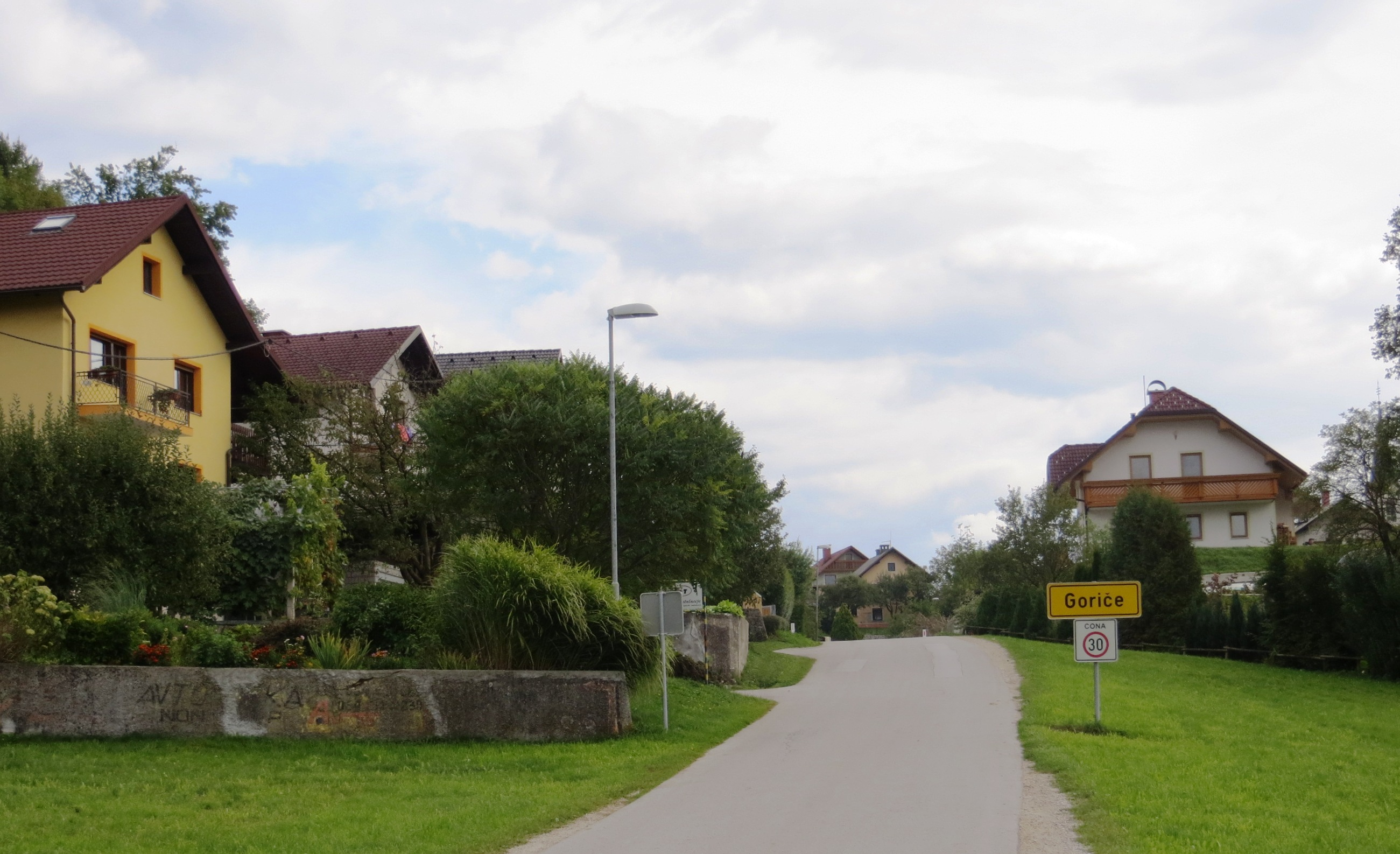

- Location in Slovenia
- Coordinates: 46°19′21.57″N 14°20′34.41″E
- Country: Slovenia
- Traditional region: Upper Carniola
- Statistical region: Upper Carniola
- Municipality: Kranj

Area
  - Total: 2.06 km^{2} (0.80 sq mi)
- Elevation: 465.4 m (1,527 ft)

Population (2002)
  - Total: 341

Goriče (pronounced [ɡɔˈɾiːtʃɛ]) is a village near Golnik in the Municipality of Kranj in the Upper Carniola region of Slovenia .

== Geography ==
Goriče stands at the foot of Mount Križe (Slovene: Kriška gora, 1,473 m), also known as Mount Zalog (Zaloška gora). It has a sunny exposure in a somewhat damp area along Sevnica Creek, which is subject to flash flooding during storms.

== Name ==
Goriče was attested in written sources in 1221 as Gorschach (and as Görczah in 1353 and Nider Goertschach in 1415). Like the structurally similar name Goričane, the name Goriče was originally a plural demonym, *Goričane 'residents of Gorica', derived from the common place name Gorica (literally, 'small mountain') and referring to the local topography.

== History ==
The local topographic name Na gradišču (literally, 'at the fortress') and the related farming surname Gradiščar hint that there was prehistoric settlement in the area. In addition to mention of the village in written sources in 1221, viticulture was recorded in Gradiče in 1376, preserved today in the microtoponym V vinogradu (literally, 'in the vineyard'). There were formerly a brick works and lime kiln in Goriče, but these have been abandoned. During the Second World War, five unknown hostages were shot in the village on 10 July 1942.

=== Mass grave ===
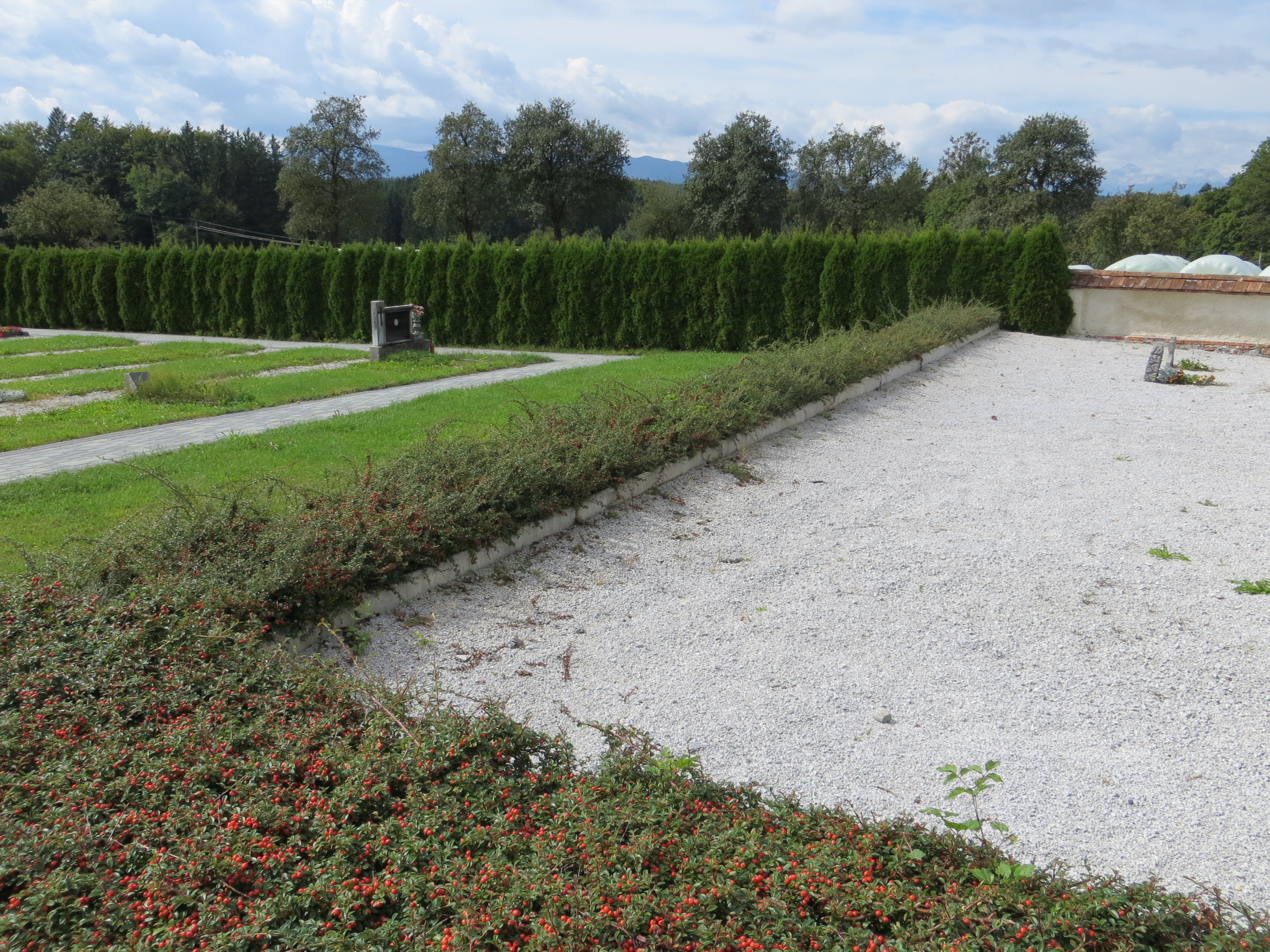
Goriče Mass Grave

Goriče is the site of a mass grave from the period immediately after the Second World War. The Goriče Mass Grave (Slovene: Grobišče Goriče) lies outside the old part of the village cemetery, next to the former cemetery wall, and is marked by a visible mound. The grave contains the remains of 40 German soldiers. The remains were discovered wrapped in tarpaulins while razing the old cemetery wall in 1973.

== Church ==
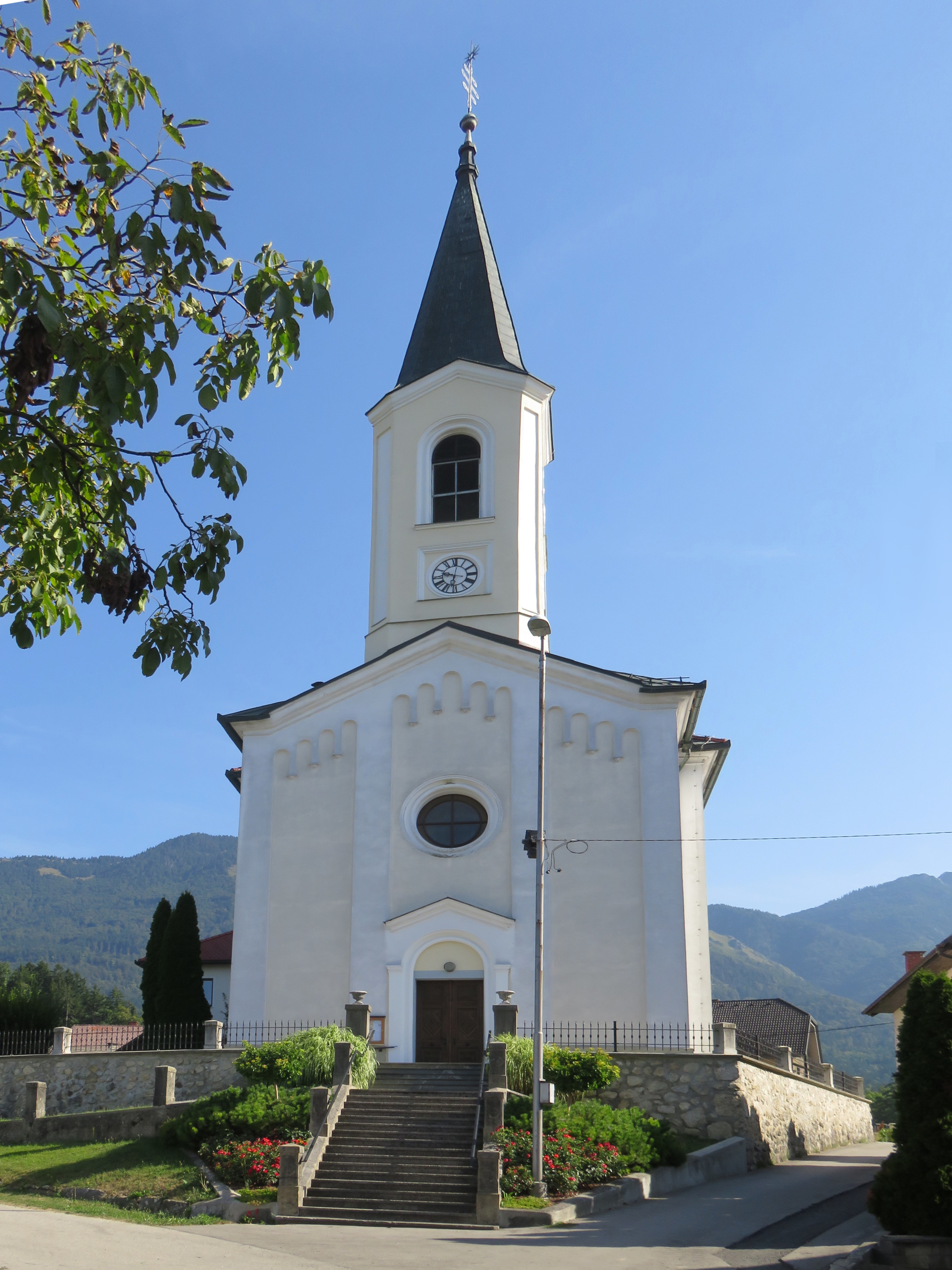
Saint Andrew's Church

The parish church in the settlement is dedicated to Saint Andrew. It contains paintings dating to 1852 by Gašpar Luka Goetzl (1782–1857) and Franc Pustavrh (1827–1871).
