= 1996 Slovenian parliamentary election =

← 1992	November 10, 1996	2000 →

All 90 seats in the National Assembly 46 seats needed for a majority
- Turnout: 73.67% (▼12.00 pp)
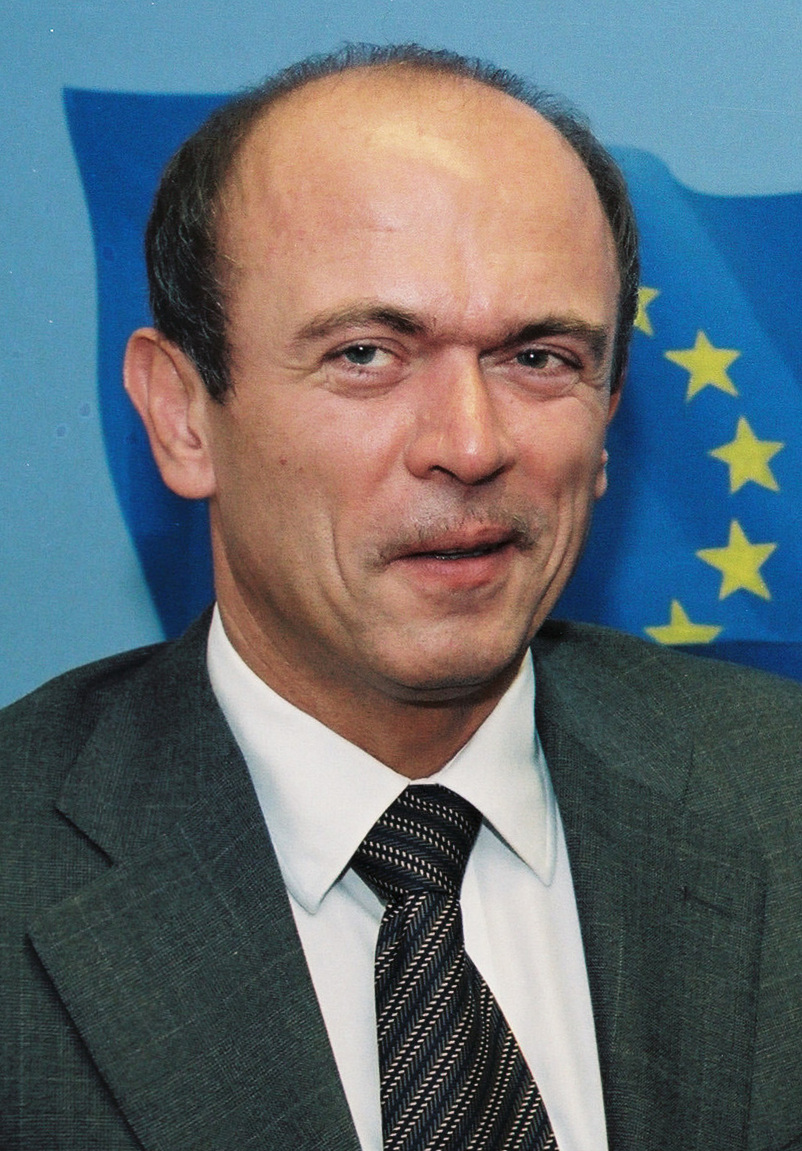

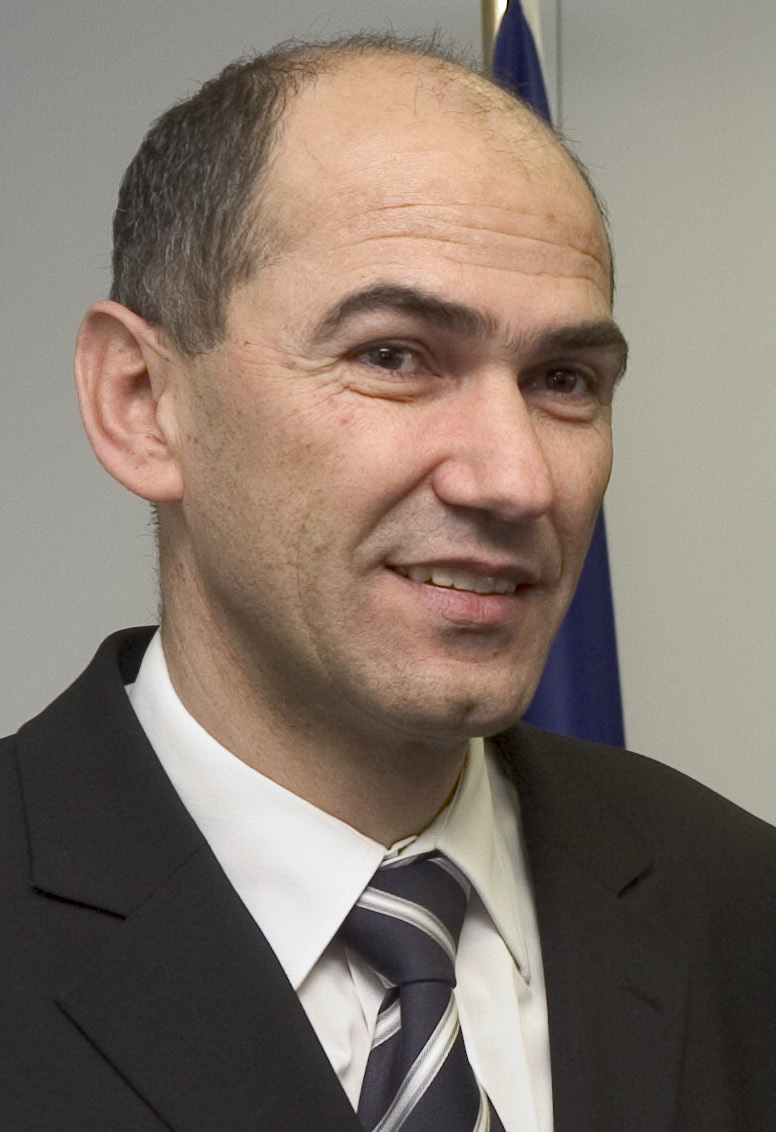

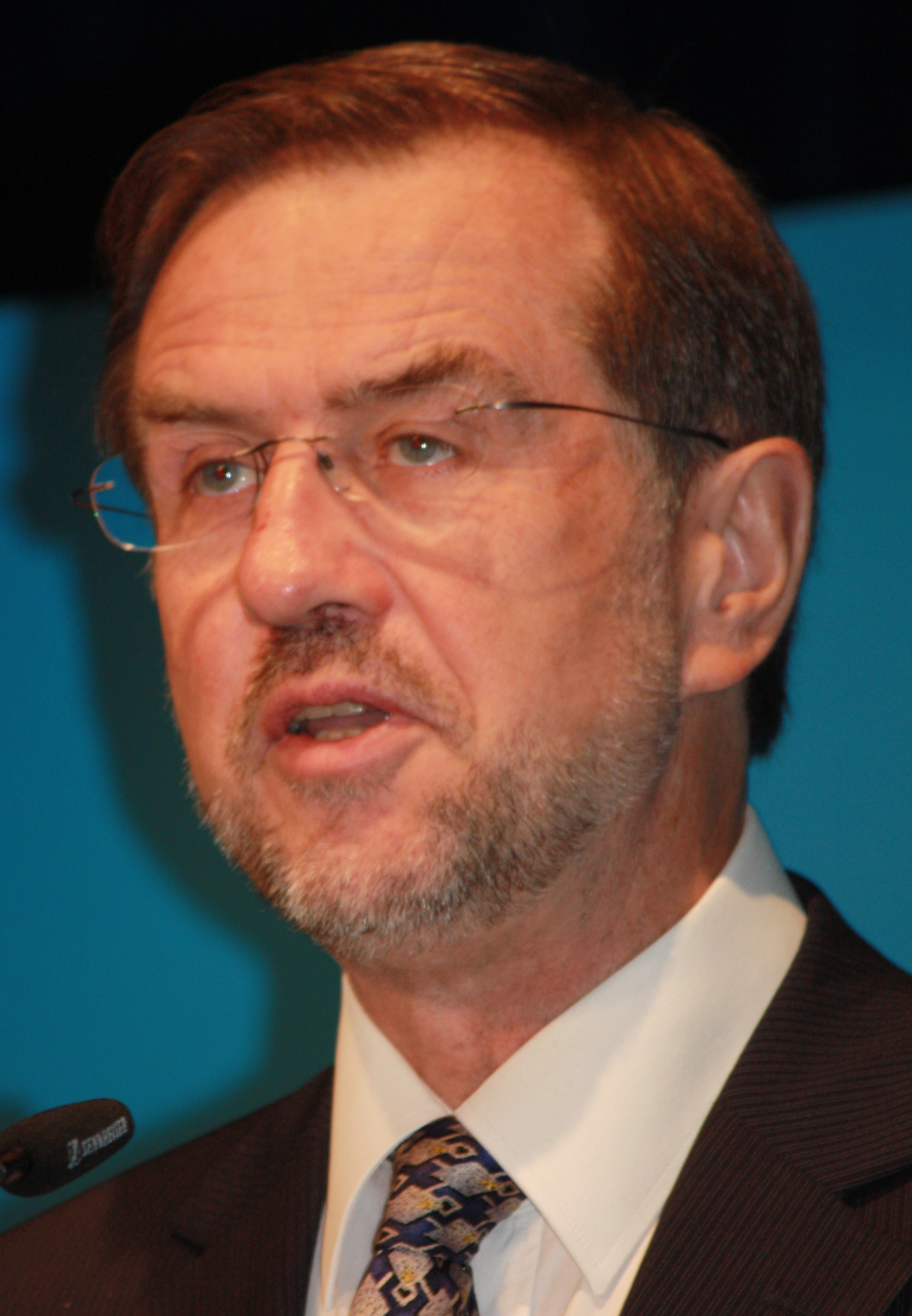

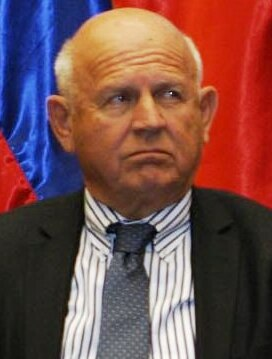

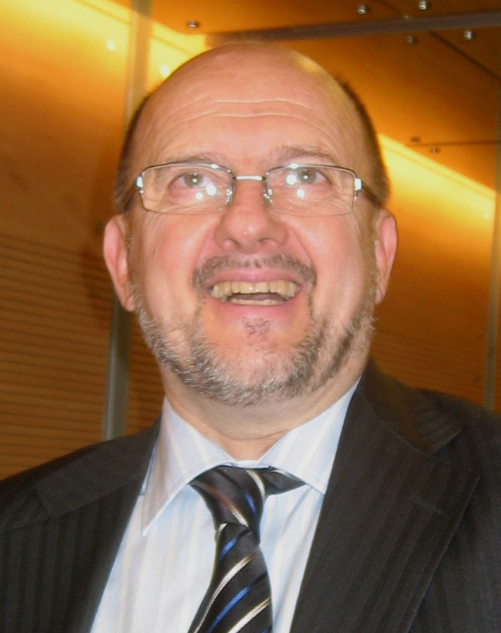
	First party	Second party	Third party
Leader	Janez Drnovšek	Marjan Podobnik	Janez Janša
Party	LDS	SLS	SDSS
Last election	22 seats	10	4 seats
Seats won	25	19	16
Seat change	▲3	▲9	▲12
Popular vote	288,783	207,186	172,470
Percentage	27.01%	19.38%	16.13%
	Fourth party	Fifth party	Sixth party
Leader	Lojze Peterle	Janez Kocijančič	Jože Globačnik
Party	SKD	ZLSD	DeSUS
Last election	15 seats	14 seats
Seats won	10	9	5
Seat change	▼5	▼5	New
Popular vote	102,852	96,597	46,152
Percentage	9.62%	9.03%	4.32%
	Seventh party
Leader	Zmago Jelinčič
Party	SNS
Last election	12
Seats won	4
Seat change	▼8
Popular vote	34,422
Percentage	3.22%
Prime Minister before election
Janez Drnovšek
LDS
Elected Prime Minister
Janez Drnovšek
LDS

Parliamentary elections were held in Slovenia on 10 November 1996. The result was a victory for Liberal Democracy of Slovenia, which won 25 of the 90 seats. Party leader Janez Drnovšek was re-elected Prime Minister by the Parliament on 9 January 1997.

== Results ==
Party	Votes	%	Seats	+/–
Liberal Democracy of Slovenia	288,783	27.01	25	+3
Slovenian People's Party	207,186	19.38	19	+9
Social Democratic Party of Slovenia	172,470	16.13	16	+12
Slovene Christian Democrats	102,852	9.62	10	–5
United List of Social Democrats	96,597	9.03	9	–5
Democratic Party of Pensioners of Slovenia	46,152	4.32	5	New
Slovenian National Party	34,422	3.22	4	–8
Democratic Party of Slovenia	28,624	2.68	0	–6
Greens of Slovenia	18,853	1.76	0	–5
Slovenian Craftsmen and Entrepreneurial Party–Centrum Party	12,335	1.15	0	0
Slovenian Forum	11,383	1.06	0	New
Liberal Party	7,972	0.75	0	0
National Labour Party	5,827	0.54	0	New
Green Alternative of Slovenia	5,602	0.52	0	New
Republican Association of Slovenia	5,071	0.47	0	0
Communist Party of Slovenia	5,027	0.47	0	New
Christian Social Union	4,767	0.45	0	New
Slovenian National Right	3,327	0.31	0	New
Patriotic United Retirement Party–League for Slovenia	2,025	0.19	0	New
New Party	1,104	0.10	0	New
Forward Slovenia	886	0.08	0	New
Party for the Equality of Regions	541	0.05	0	New
Independents	7,398	0.69	0	0
Minority representatives			2	0
Total	1,069,204	100.00	90	0
Valid votes	1,069,204	94.10		
Invalid/blank votes	67,007	5.90		
Total votes	1,136,211	100.00		
Registered voters/turnout	1,542,218	73.67		
Source: DVK
