= Kamenik (mountain) =

Mountain in Montenegro

- Каменик
- Location within Montenegro

Highest point
- Elevation: 1,815 m (5,955 ft)
- Coordinates: 42°38′30″N 19°18′56″E

Geography
- Location: Montenegro
- Parent range: Dinaric Alps

Kamenik (Montenegrin and Serbian Cyrillic: Каменик, literally: Rocky Mountain) is a Dinaric limestone mountain, located in Rovca region in central Montenegro.

Located in the far north of the Podgorica Capital City territory, to the west of the village of Trmanje, known as the birthplace of the People's Hero Veljko Vlahović. The highest peak is Veliki Kamenik, which is 1815 meters high. Kamenik is one of the most heavily karstified and least accessible Montenegrin mountains, due to the nature of the terrain and relief.
