= Borut Sajovic =

Slovene politician (born 1960)

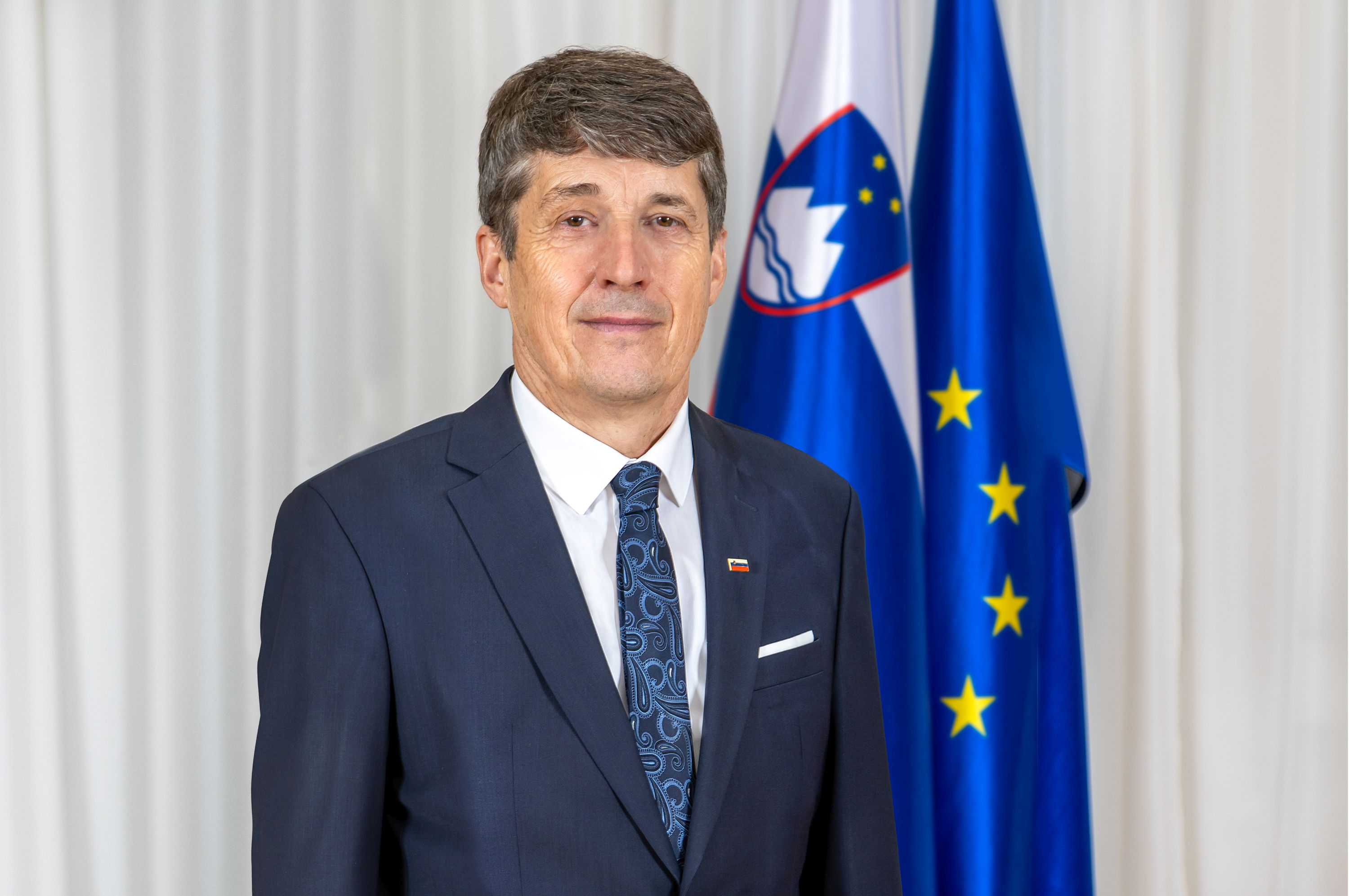

Minister of Defence of the Republic of Slovenia
- In office 7 October 2024 – 4 June 2026
- Prime Minister: Robert Golob
- Preceded by: Marjan Šarec

Member of the National Assembly of the Republic of Slovenia
- In office 13 May 2022 – 7 October 2024

Mayor of the Municipality of Tržič
- In office 2006 – 13 May 2022
- Preceded by: Pavel Rupar
- Succeeded by: Peter Miklič

Personal details
- Born: July 18, 1960 (age 65) Kranj, SFR Yugoslavia
- Party: Freedom Movement (since 2022)
- Other political affiliations: LDS (2004–2022)
- Profession: Veterinarian, politician

Borut Sajovic (born 18 July 1960 in Kranj) is a Slovenian politician, veterinarian and member of parliament.

Sajovic served as a member of the Freedom Movement in the National Assembly of the Republic of Slovenia from June 2022 to October 2024. He had previously been an MP between 2004 and 2011 as a member of the Liberal Democracy of Slovenia. From 2006 to 2022, he was the mayor of the Municipality of Tržič.

Since 7 October 2024, he has been serving as the Minister of Defence of the Republic of Slovenia.

== Biography ==
Borut Sajovic, a member of the Liberal Democracy of Slovenia political party, was elected to the National Assembly of the Republic of Slovenia in 2004. During that term, he served as a member of the Committee on the Environment and Spatial Planning and the Committee on Agriculture, Forestry and Food. He was also vice-president of the Commission under the Incompatibility of Holding Public Office with Gainful Activity Act and a member of the Mandate and Elections Commission.

In 2006, he was elected Mayor of the Municipality of Tržič. As mayor, he was accused of sexism. Despite the controversy, he remained in office until 2022, when he did not run for re-election (2006 – 54.15%, 2010 – 51.44%, 2014 – 61.16%, 2018 – 65.88%).

In 2022, Sajovic joined the Freedom Movement and was elected as a deputy in the National Assembly of the Republic of Slovenia, which ended his term as mayor of Tržič. On 25 May 2022, after Robert Golob was elected Prime Minister, Sajovic became the head of the Freedom Movement's parliamentary group. He also served as a member of the Mandate and Elections Commission and the Parliamentary Inquiry Commission investigating alleged financial irregularities in the companies GEN-I and STAR Solar, and their links to the financing of the Freedom Movement.

On 17 September 2024, Prime Minister Golob announced that he would nominate Sajovic as the new Minister of Defence. The candidate was presented to the coalition the same day during a meeting on personnel issues. Sajovic was confirmed by the relevant committee and sworn in as Minister on 7 October 2024.
