= Party of Slovenian People =

Party of Slovenian People Stranka slovenskega naroda
- Leader: Mihael Jarc
- Founded: 2001
- Split from: Slovenian National Party
- Headquarters: Ljubljana
- Ideology: Slovenian nationalism Direct democracy Soft euroscepticism
- National affiliation: Alliance Let us Liberate Slovenia
- Colours: Sky blue
- National Assembly: 0 / 90
- European Parliament: 0 / 9

Website
- ssn.si

The Party of Slovenian People (Stranka slovenskega naroda, SSN) is an extra-parliamentary party in Slovenia. In the 2008 legislative election in Slovenia, the party won 0.25% of the popular vote and no seats in the National Assembly. In the early election on 4 December 2011, the party won 0.09% of the vote, thus not gaining any seats in the National Assembly. The party won 0.4% of the vote in the European Parliament election on 25 May 2014, failing to gain any seats.

The party has its roots in the far-right Slovenian National Right party, which was transformed and renamed after its failure in the 1996 parliamentary election. In later years, it was associated with the nationalistic organization Hervardi. The party's candidate for the 2008 legislative election was Andrej Šiško, formerly a prominent member of the ultras group "Viole Maribor". Šiško was apprehended during a pre-election debate appearance due to an outstanding arrest warrant after failing to appear in prison to begin serving a prison sentence for a 1992 murder attempt.
