= Letenice =

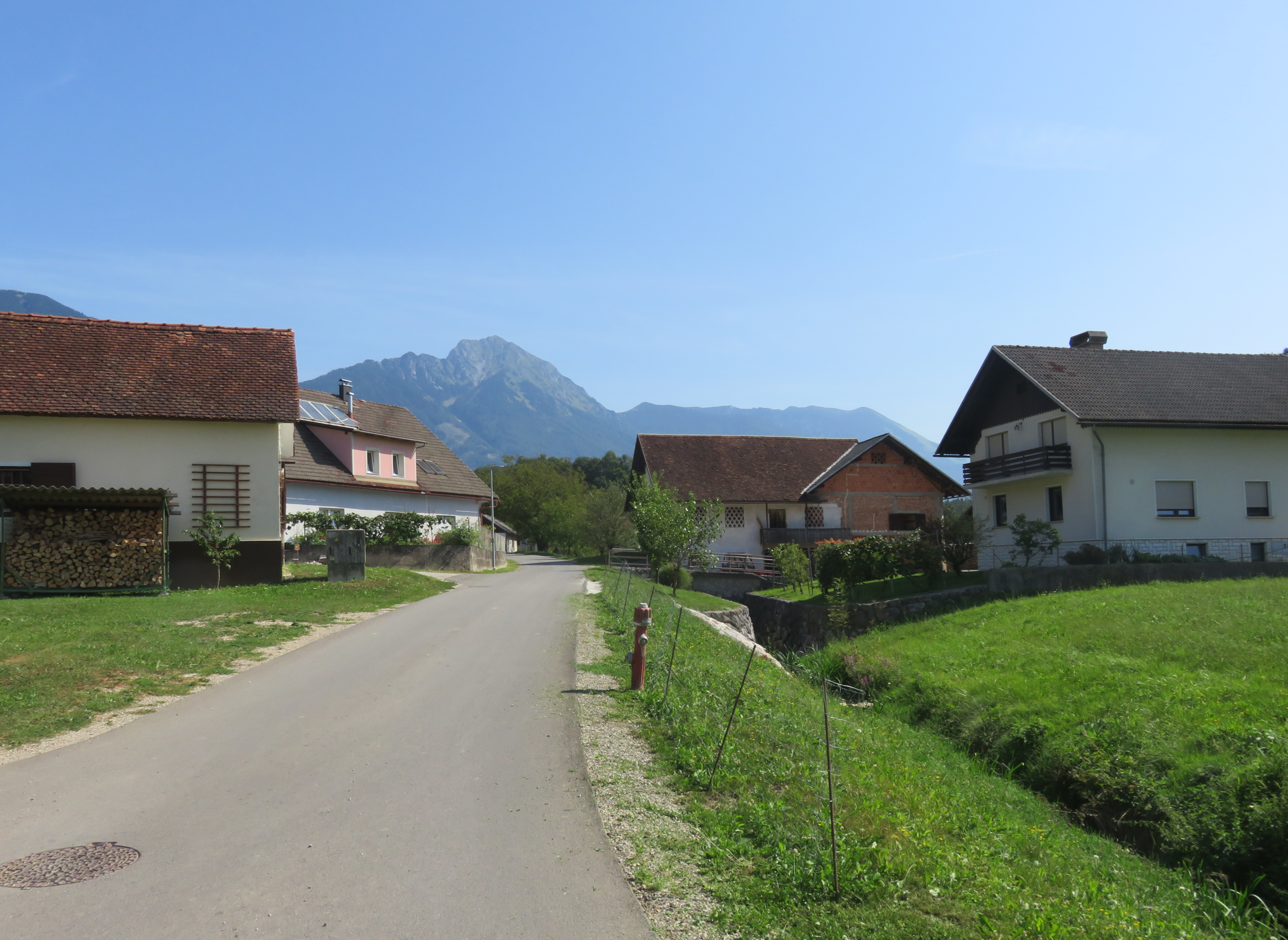

- Location in Slovenia
- Coordinates: 46°18′28.36″N 14°20′18.21″E
- Country: Slovenia
- Traditional region: Upper Carniola
- Statistical region: Upper Carniola
- Municipality: Kranj

Area
  - Total: 2.07 km^{2} (0.80 sq mi)
- Elevation: 435.8 m (1,430 ft)

Population (2002)
  - Total: 103

Letenice (pronounced [lɛˈteːnitsɛ]) is a small village north of Kranj in the Upper Carniola region of Slovenia. It includes the hamlets of Zavoda and Kamnjek.
