= Pavel Rupar's Voice of Pensioners =

Pavel Rupar's Voice of Pensioners Glas upokojencev Pavla Ruparja
- President: Pavel Rupar
- Vice President: Majda Kragelj Zbačnik
- Supervisory Board: Jože Zorko
- Founded: January 20, 2024
- Dissolved: April 23, 2026
- Ideology: Pensioners' interests Single-issue
- Political position: Centre-right
- International affiliation: none
- Colours: Blue White
- National Assembly: 0 / 90
- European Parliament: 0 / 9
- Mayors: 0 / 212
- Municipal councillors: 0 / 2,750

Website
- drustvo1oktober.si

Pavel Rupar's Voice of Pensioners (Slovene: Glas upokojencev Pavla Ruparja) was a Slovenian political party founded on January 20, 2024. Its president was Pavel Rupar. The party was established a year after the founding of the initiative Voice of Pensioners of Slovenia and the 1 October Institute, both advocated for higher pensions for Slovenian retirees.

== History ==
=== Early history ===
The Voice of Pensioners initiative was founded by former MP of the Slovenian Democratic Party (SDS) and former mayor of the Municipality of Tržič Pavel Rupar.

Due to what they described as increasingly difficult living conditions for Slovenian pensioners—caused by inflation and poor access to healthcare—the initiative first addressed the public in mid-January 2023 and presented its goals. They announced their first major rally, which was held on 1 February 2023. In April of the same year, Rupar confirmed that the Association 1 October was considering the formation of a pensioners' political party. The association also began collecting signatures for a legislative proposal aimed at increasing pensions.

On 12 June 2023, the Voice of Pensioners and the 1 October Institute submitted a bill to the legislative process calling for an extraordinary pension increase. The proposal stated that pensions under €1,000 would be increased by 20%, those up to €1,500 by 10%, and those above €1,500 by 5%. A total of 10,278 signatures were collected in support.

At the end of June 2023, a group of about 60 pensioners led by Rupar visited Brussels. During a small protest and Rupar’s speech, they highlighted the “unfair treatment of certain civil organizations by the Slovenian government” and the “discrediting of protest rallies in Slovenia.” They were received by Members of the European Parliament Milan Zver and Romana Tomc.

At a press conference in late September 2023, Rupar announced that a new political party, *Voice of Pensioners*, was in the process of being established. In the autumn, local party committees began forming across Slovenia.

=== Establishment and later developments ===
In November 2023, Rupar announced that the founding congress of the new party *Voice of Pensioners* would take place in Ljubljana on 20 January 2024. The party’s statute and program were published online.

Over 400 notarized forms of support were collected for the founding. At the congress, the party's program and statute were confirmed and party leadership was elected. The cultural portion of the event was hosted by actor Pavle Ravnohrib.

During his speech at the congress, Pavel Rupar announced that the party would participate in the 2024 European Parliament election in Slovenia as well as in the 2026 Slovenian parliamentary election. However, the party ultimately did not run its own list in the European elections but supported the SDS candidate Zala Tomašič.

In autumn 2024, internal conflicts arose within the party when president Rupar demanded explanations from vice president Igor Černoga over suspicions of embezzlement of party funds. Rupar denied the allegations and, allegedly in violation of the party's statute, expelled Černoga along with supervisory board member Suad Muslimovič.

== Election results ==
=== National Assembly ===
Election	Leader	Votes	%	Seats	+/–	Government
2026	Pavel Rupar	4,193	0.36 (#14)	0 / 90	New	Extra-parliamentary
