= Zalog, Kranj =

Zalog
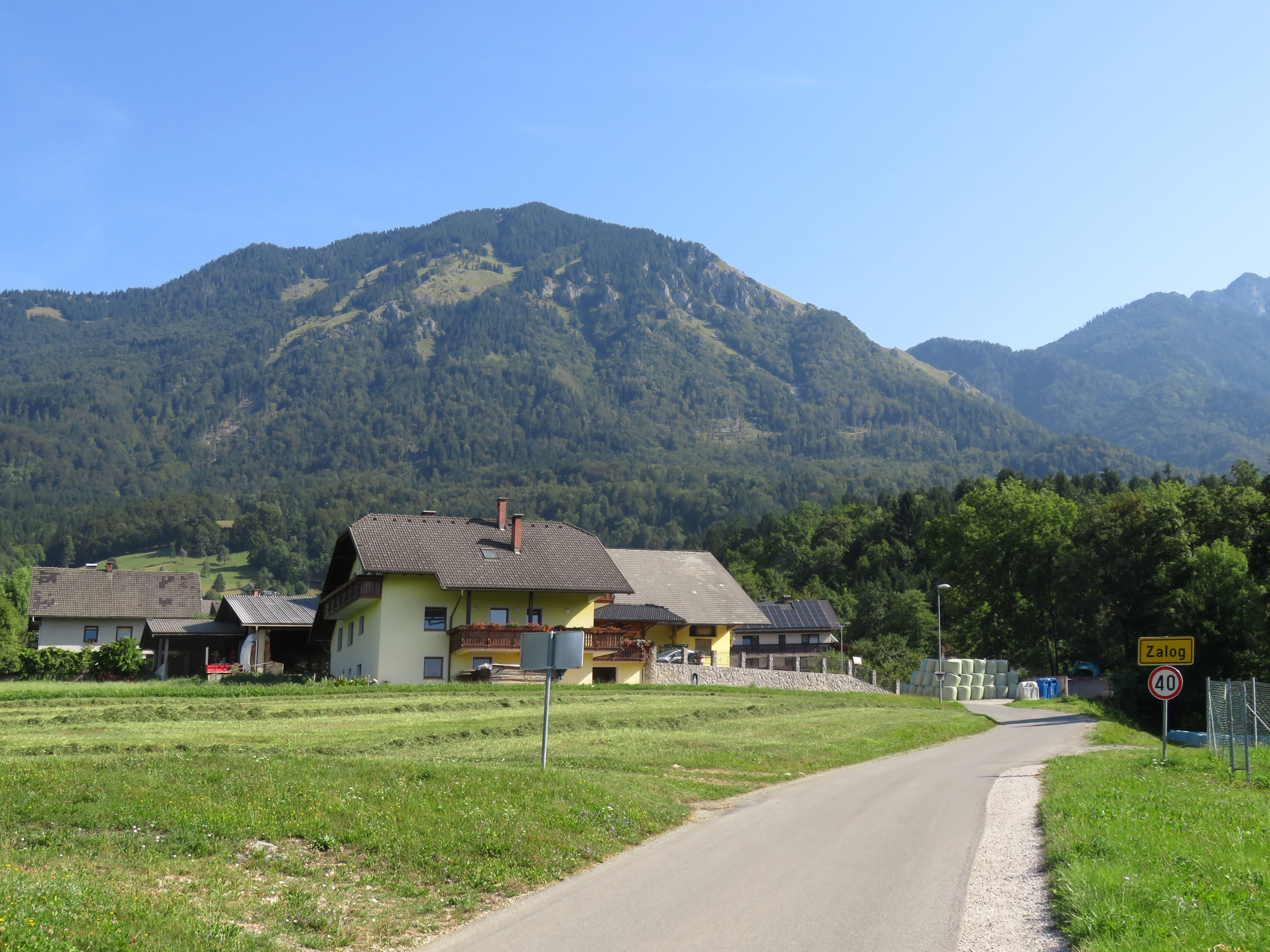

- Location in Slovenia
- Coordinates: 46°19′31.5″N 14°21′11.69″E
- Country: Slovenia
- Traditional region: Upper Carniola
- Statistical region: Upper Carniola
- Municipality: Kranj

Area
  - Total: 5.26 km^{2} (2.03 sq mi)
- Elevation: 525 m (1,722 ft)

Population (2002)
  - Total: 77

Zalog (pronounced [ˈzaːlɔk]; German: Saloch) is a small settlement in the hills north of Kranj in the Upper Carniola region of Slovenia. It includes the hamlet of Svarje.

== Name ==
Zalog is a relatively common place name in Slovenia. It is a fused prepositional phrase that has lost case inflection, derived from za 'behind' + log '(wet) partially wooded meadow near water' or 'woods (near a settlement)'. The name therefore originally refers to the settlement's location in relation to a local geographical feature. Nearby Mount Zalog (Zaloška gora, 1,715 metres or 5,627 feet), also known as Fat Peak (Tolsti vrh), is named after Zalog.

== History ==
In the past, Zalog was an important center of hog farming. Pigs from Zalog were sold as far away as Carinthia. In the 20th century many vacation houses were built in the area by residents of Kranj, Ljubljana, and Zagreb.

== Church ==
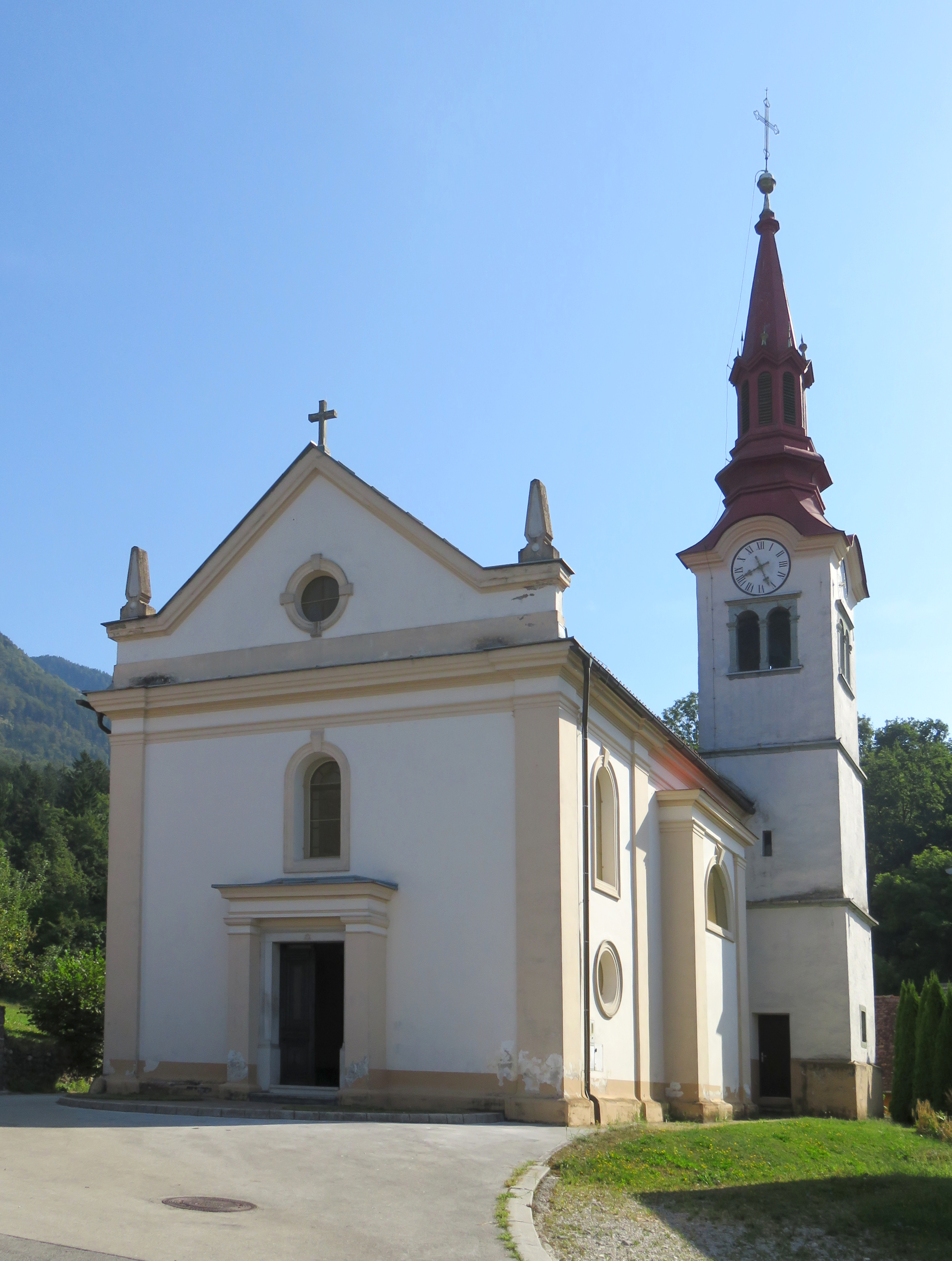
View from southwest

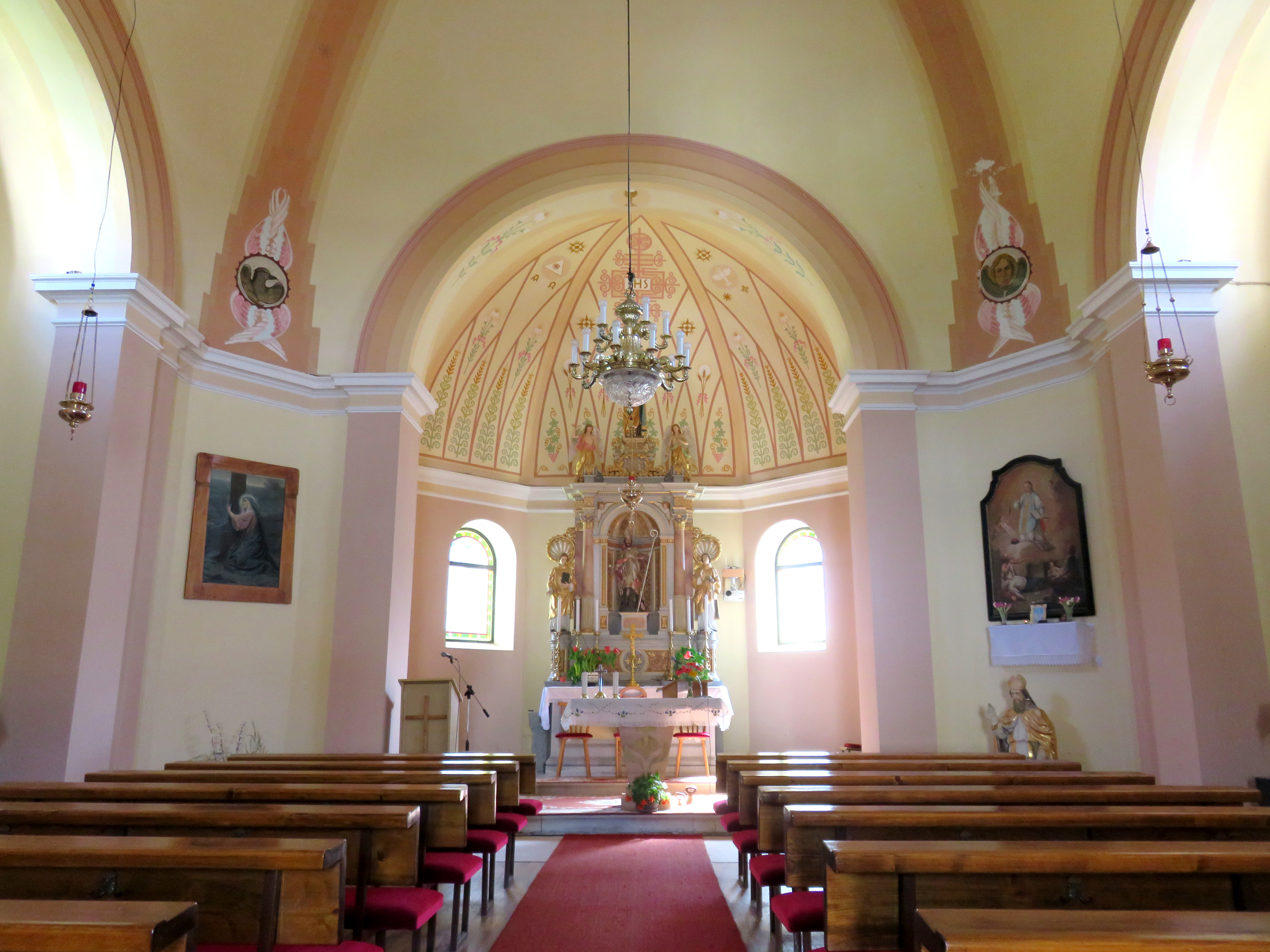
Interior

Saint Lambert's Church

The local church is dedicated to Saint Lambert. It is a late Gothic structure that was first mentioned in written sources in 1493 and was once a pilgrimage destination.
