= Golnik =

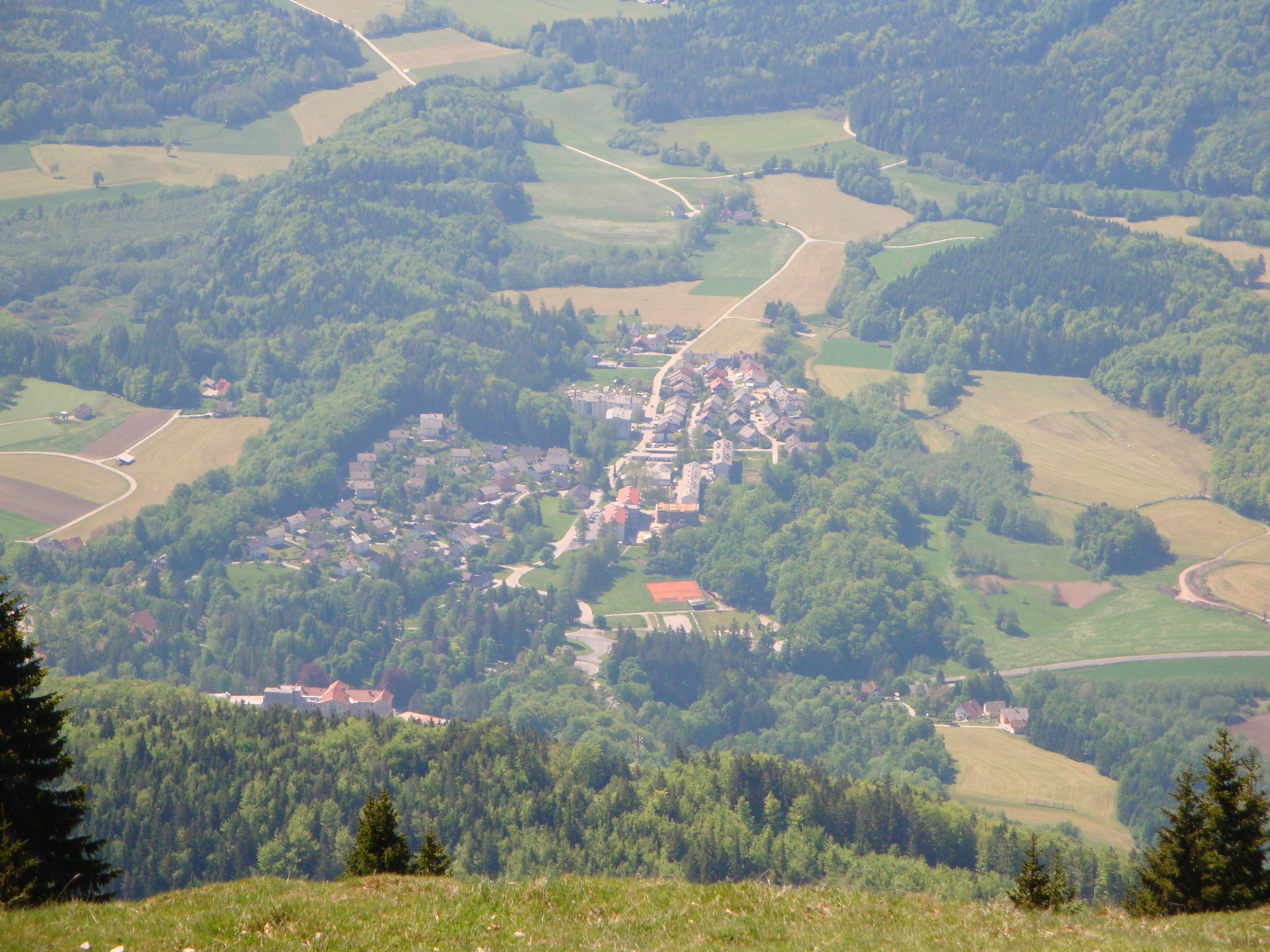

- Location in Slovenia
- Coordinates: 46°19′53.38″N 14°19′50.07″E
- Country: Slovenia
- Traditional region: Upper Carniola
- Statistical region: Upper Carniola
- Municipality: Kranj

Area
  - Total: 2.76 km^{2} (1.07 sq mi)
- Elevation: 557.9 m (1,830 ft)

Population (2002)
  - Total: 1,026
- Postal code: 4204

Golnik (pronounced [ɡɔlˈniːk] or [ɡɔu̯ˈniːk]; German: Gallenfels) is a village in the Municipality of Kranj in the Upper Carniolan region of Slovenia.

Since 1921, it has been best known for its hospital for diagnosis and treatment of patients with pulmonary and allergic diseases, now known as the Golnik University Clinic of Pulmonary and Allergic Diseases. Its location, good humidity conditions, and high number of sunny days per year have contributed to it becoming a leading health care centre in the region. A 16th-century castle is part of the hospital complex and it is surrounded by a park designed by the architect Ivan Vurnik.

== Gallenfels Manor ==
Golnik hospital stands in what were formerly the grounds of Gallenfels castle, a 16th century manor house that stands behind the hospital complex. The manor was constructed by the noble Kreutzer family, giving it its other name, Kreutzhof. The building retains Renaissance form. The wings envelop an arcaded quadrangle. The southern corners are reinforced by two defensive towers. In 1917 it was seized by the state in lieu of payment and subsequently used as the first location of Golnik hospital.
