= Josip Egartner =

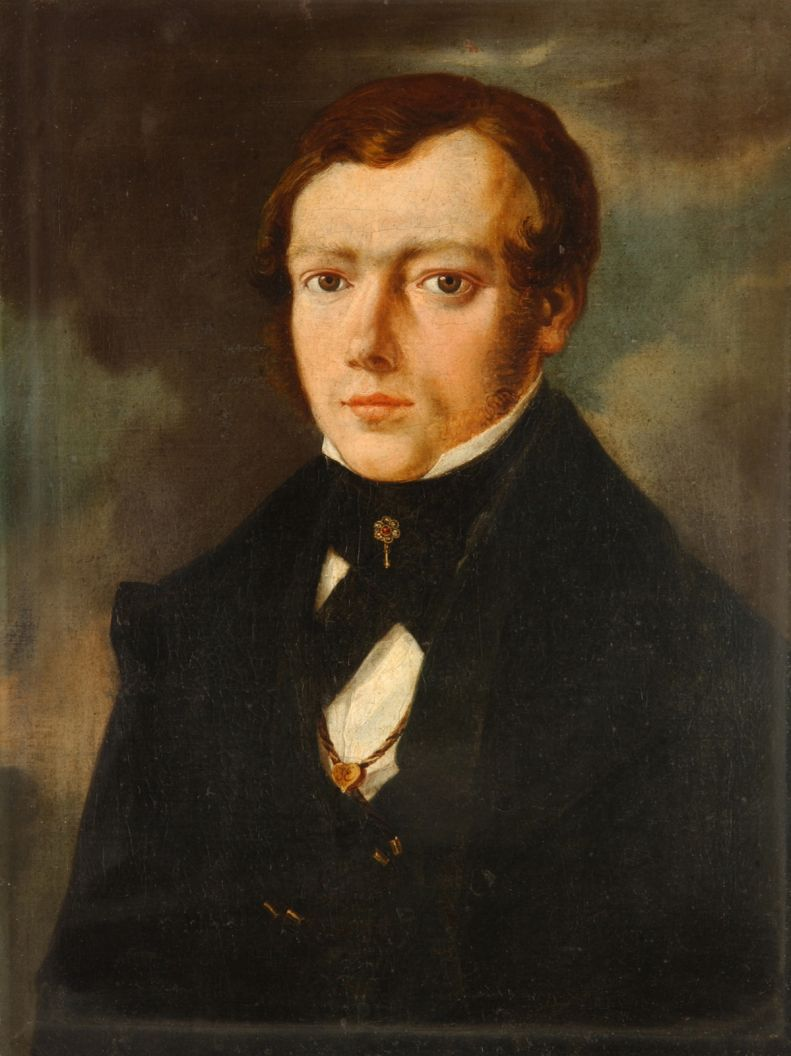
Egartner's self-portrait painting

Josip Egartner (27 March 1809 – 2 May 1849) was a Slovene painter of Austrian origin.

== Life and work ==
Josip Egartner was born as Josip Pessentheiner on 27 March 1809 in Gmünd, Carinthia.

He was adopted by the painter Leopold Layer (1752–1828), who was married to Marija Egartner, a relative of Josip Egartner. The couple did not have children of their own, and Layer taught Egartner to paint. Egartner's works are primarily of local significance.

In 1834 and 1835 he painted the frescos in the leftmost of the three churches at Rosalnice. His works include many altars and altar paintings, including two altars in the former village of Rupa (between Kokrica and Kranj) in 1838, a painting of Saint Florian in Sostro in 1839, two paintings for the pilgrimage Church of the Nativity of Mary at Trška Gora in 1843, a painting for the main altar of the parish church in Kranj, several paintings for the Church of the Nativity of Mary at Rovišče in 1844, and a painting of Saint Martin in Ig in 1849.

Egartner married Marija Pajer on 7 November 1832. His son Josip Egartner Jr. (1833–1905) was also a painter and sculptor. Egartner died in Kranj on 2 May 1849.
