= Trška Gora =

Trška Gora is a Slovene place name that may refer to:

- Trška Gora, Novo Mesto, a village on the Mount Trška Gora in the City Municipality of Novo Mesto, southeastern Slovenia
- Trška Gora, Krško, a village in the Municipality of Krško, southeastern Slovenia
