= Irene Rocas i Romaguera =

Catalan folklorist and lexicographer

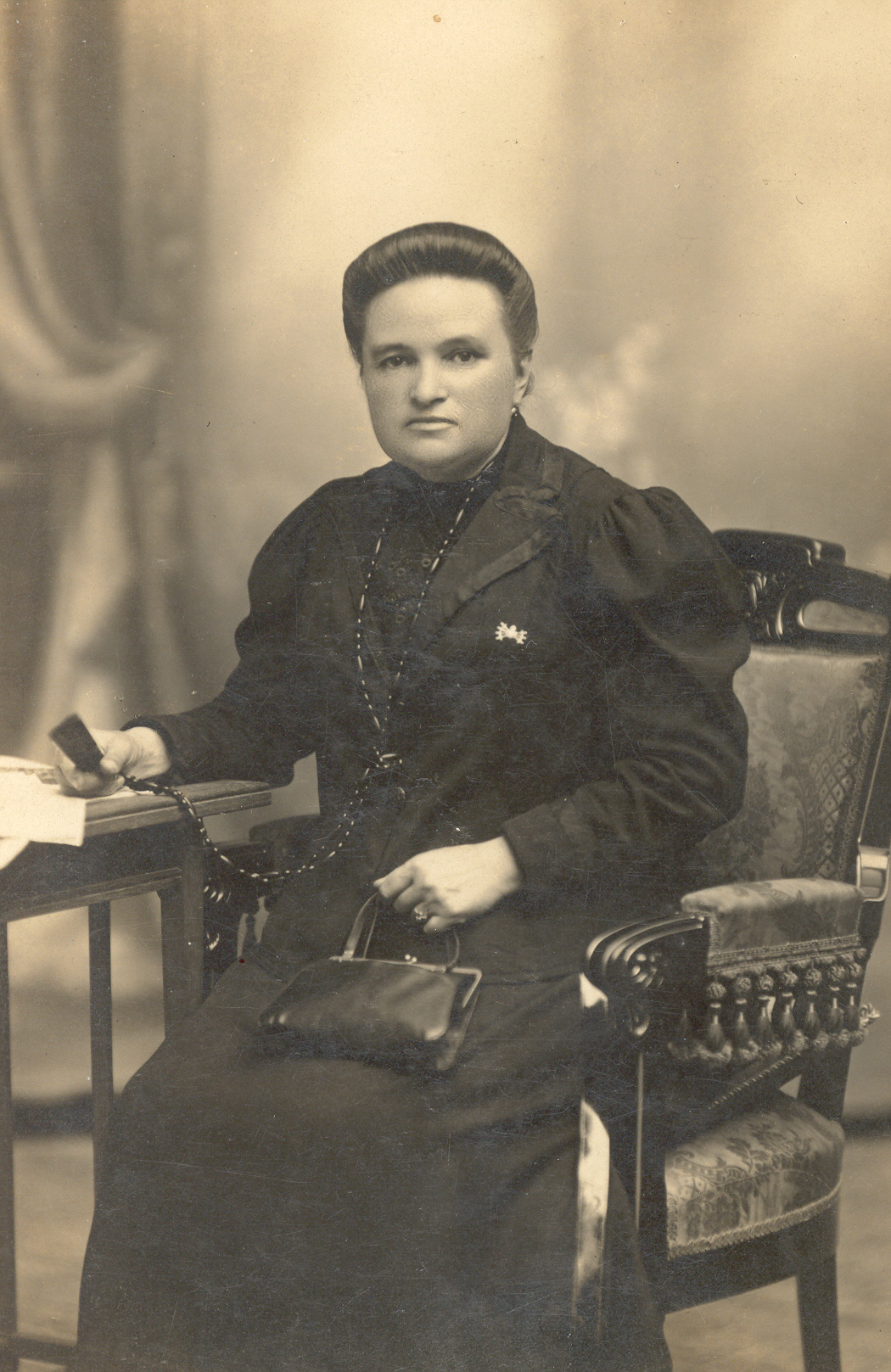
- Born: 10 August 1861; Llofriu
- Died: 5 February 1947 (aged 85); Buenos Aires
- Occupations: Writer, lexicographer
- Spouse: Joan Bassa i Bosch (m. 1882-1908; his death)
- Children: 9, including Maria Gràcia Bassa i Rocas, Florenci Bassa Rocas Q11922208, and Serafí Bassa Rocas Q11948257
- Writing career
- Language: Catalan; Spanish
- Notable work: Català-Valencià-Balear Dictionary

Irene Rocas i Romaguera (1861-1947) was a Catalan folklorist and lexicographer. Her works contributed to the research on Empordà language and literature. One of the most notable of these was the Diccionari català-valencià-balear, a collaboration with the Majorcan author Mossèn Alcover. She was the mother of the Spanish writer, folklorist, and academic, Maria Gracia Bassa i Rocas.

== Biography ==
Rocas i Romaguera was born in Llofriu on 10 August 1861, to an Empordà family. Her upbringing was described as conservative with strong religious conviction and Catalan influence. She would display the same convictions and values in her adult and family life. In 1882, Romaguera was married to Joan Bassa i Bosch, an Indian who was twenty years her senior and a resident of Llofriu. In 1908, her husband died, leaving her to raise those who remained of their nine children: M. Gràcia, Aniceta, Ernesta, Florenci Bassa Rocas, M. Àngels, Serafí Bassa Rocas, Lluís, M. Montserrat, and Maria. Some of these died in their infancy. She also lived in Olot for some time.

Rocas immigrated to Argentina and settled in Buenos Aires, as did her daughter Gracia. She started publishing her written works in the attempt to promote the Catalan language, values, and culture. She collaborated with l'Arxiu d'Etnografia i Folklore de Catalunya and the l'Arxiu de l'Obra del Cançoner Popular de Catalunya. Her works for these institutions included a compendium of corrandes, fables, and paremias. Her connections with the Catalan intelligentsia allowed her to practice her profession as a lexicographer. Rocas collaborated with Alcover in the production of a dictionary of the Catalan language beginning in 1911. This publication had more than 15,000 entries from the Emporda language.

Some of Rocas's published works include Refranys i dites populars de Llofriu, recollides per Irene Rocas. She was also the subject of the text written by Dolors Grau released in 2004 called, Memories per Irene Rocas (1861-1910): un testimoni excepcional des de l'Emporda, Olot i Barcelona.

Rocas heavily influenced her daughter Gracia, who also settled in Argentina and worked as a journalist. Gracia also became a folklorist and was instrumental in publishing a number of her mother's works.

She died on 5 February 1947, aged 85, in Buenos Aires.
