= 2026 Tour of Slovenia =

2026 UCI ProSeries
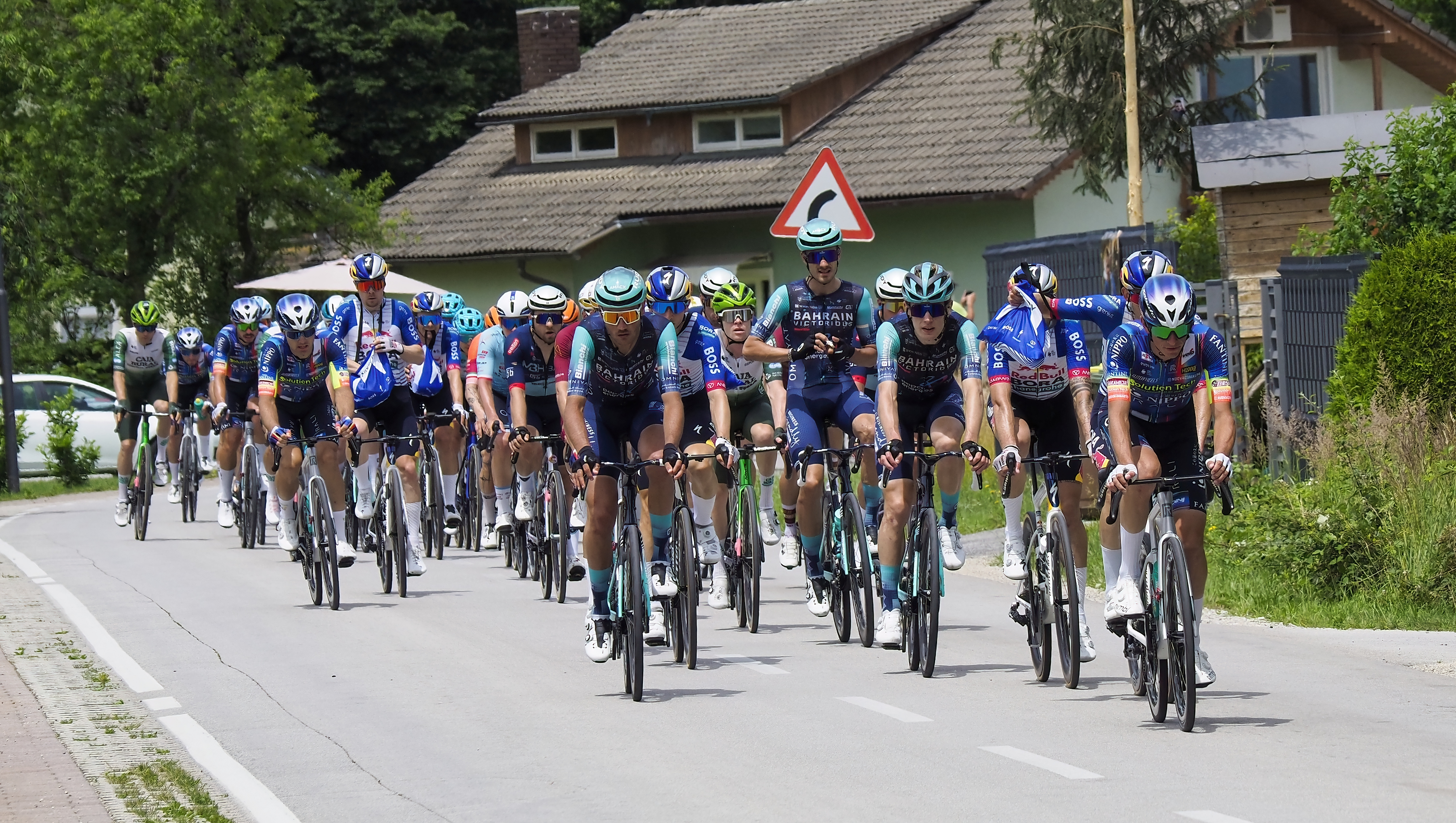
- Peloton at Stage 1 (km 31)

Race details
- Dates: 17–21 June 2025
- Stages: 5
- Distance: 800.6 km (497.5 mi)
- Winning time: 19h 45' 44"

Results
Jersey awarded to the overall winner	Winner	Florian Lipowitz (GER)	(Red Bull–Bora–Hansgrohe)
	Second	Giulio Pellizzari (ITA)	(Red Bull–Bora–Hansgrohe)
	Third	Jakob Omrzel (SLO)	(Team Bahrain Victorious)
Jersey awarded to the points classification winner	Points	Laurence Pithie (NZL)	(Red Bull–Bora–Hansgrohe)
Jersey awarded to the mountains classification winner	Mountains	Florian Lipowitz (GER)	(Red Bull–Bora–Hansgrohe)
Jersey awarded to the young rider classification winner	Young rider	Jakob Omrzel (SLO)	(Team Bahrain Victorious)
	Team	(Germany) Red Bull–Bora–Hansgrohe	

The 2026 Tour of Slovenia (Slovene: Dirka po Sloveniji) was the 32nd edition of the Tour of Slovenia stage race, held between 17 and 21 June 2026. The 2.Pro category race was part of the UCI ProSeries. The race returned to previous timetable to late June. The total prize money was €70,545.

Points classification leader jersey was changed from red to cyan blue this year.

== Teams ==
Two of eighteen UCI WorldTeams, ten UCI ProTeams and five UCI Continental teams make up the seventeen teams that participated in the race.

The best-positioned riders (according to the UCI ranking) were Florian Lipowitz (Red Bull–Bora–Hansgrohe), Giulio Pellizzari (Red Bull–Bora–Hansgrohe) and Laurence Pithie (Red Bull–Bora–Hansgrohe). Jakob Omrzel (Team Bahrain Victorious), winner of Paris–Roubaix Juniors (2024) and Giro Next Gen (2025).

UCI WorldTeams

- Red Bull–Bora–Hansgrohe
- Team Bahrain Victorious

UCI ProTeams

- Bardiani–CSF 7 Saber
- Burgos Burpellet BH
- Caja Rural–Seguros RGA
- Equipo Kern Pharma
- Euskaltel–Euskadi
- MBH Bank CSB Telecom Fort
- Modern Adventure Pro Cycling
- Solution Tech NIPPO Rali
- Team Novo Nordisk
- Team Polti VisitMalta

UCI Continental Teams

- Factor Racing
- Kolesarski Klub Novo Mesto
- Pogi Team Gusto Ljubljana
- Team United Shipping
- Wibatech Lubelskie Perła Polski

== Route ==
After 13 years, the race returns to the most famous mountain pass in Slovenia - Vršič (1611 m) in Stage 4.

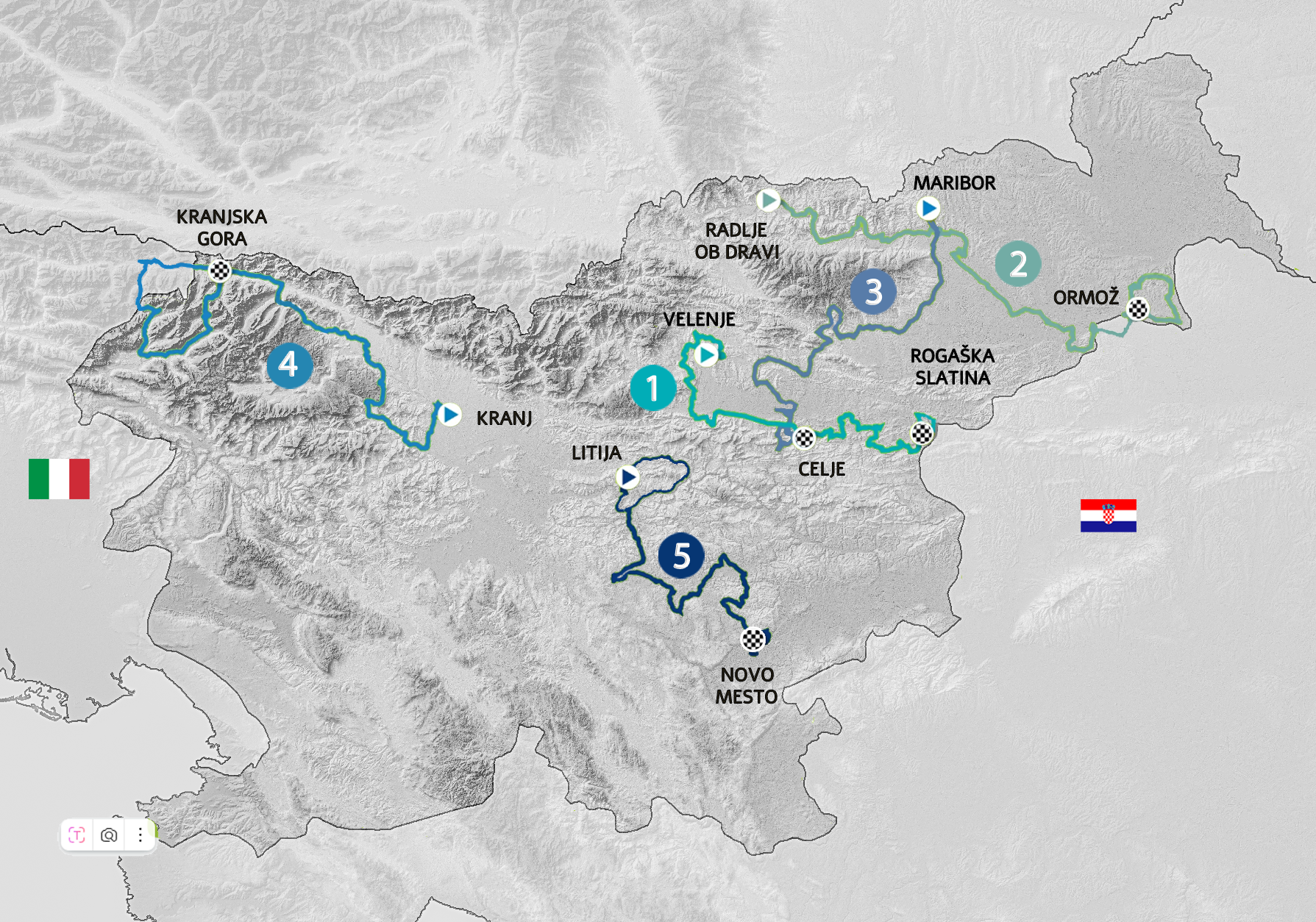
Route of the 2026 Tour of Slovenia

Stage characteristics and winners
Stage	Date	Course	Distance	Elevation gain	Type	Stage winner
1	17 June	Velenje to Rogaška Slatina	141.6 km (88.0 mi)	1,523 m (4,997 ft)	Plain stage	Laurence Pithie (NZL)
2	18 June	Radlje ob Dravi to Ormož	176.8 km (109.9 mi)	1,390 m (4,560 ft)	Hilly stage	Dušan Rajović (SRB)
3	19 June	Maribor to Celje	137 km (85 mi)	2,033 m (6,670 ft)	Hilly stage	Laurence Pithie (NZL)
4	20 June	Kranj to Kranjska Gora	183.1 km (113.8 mi)	3,825 m (12,549 ft)	Mountain stage	Florian Lipowitz (GER)
5	21 June	Litija to Novo Mesto	162.1 km (100.7 mi)	2,090 m (6,860 ft)	Hilly stage	Florian Lipowitz (GER)
Total			800.6 km (497.5 mi)	10,999 m (36,086 ft)		

== Stages ==
=== Stage 1 ===
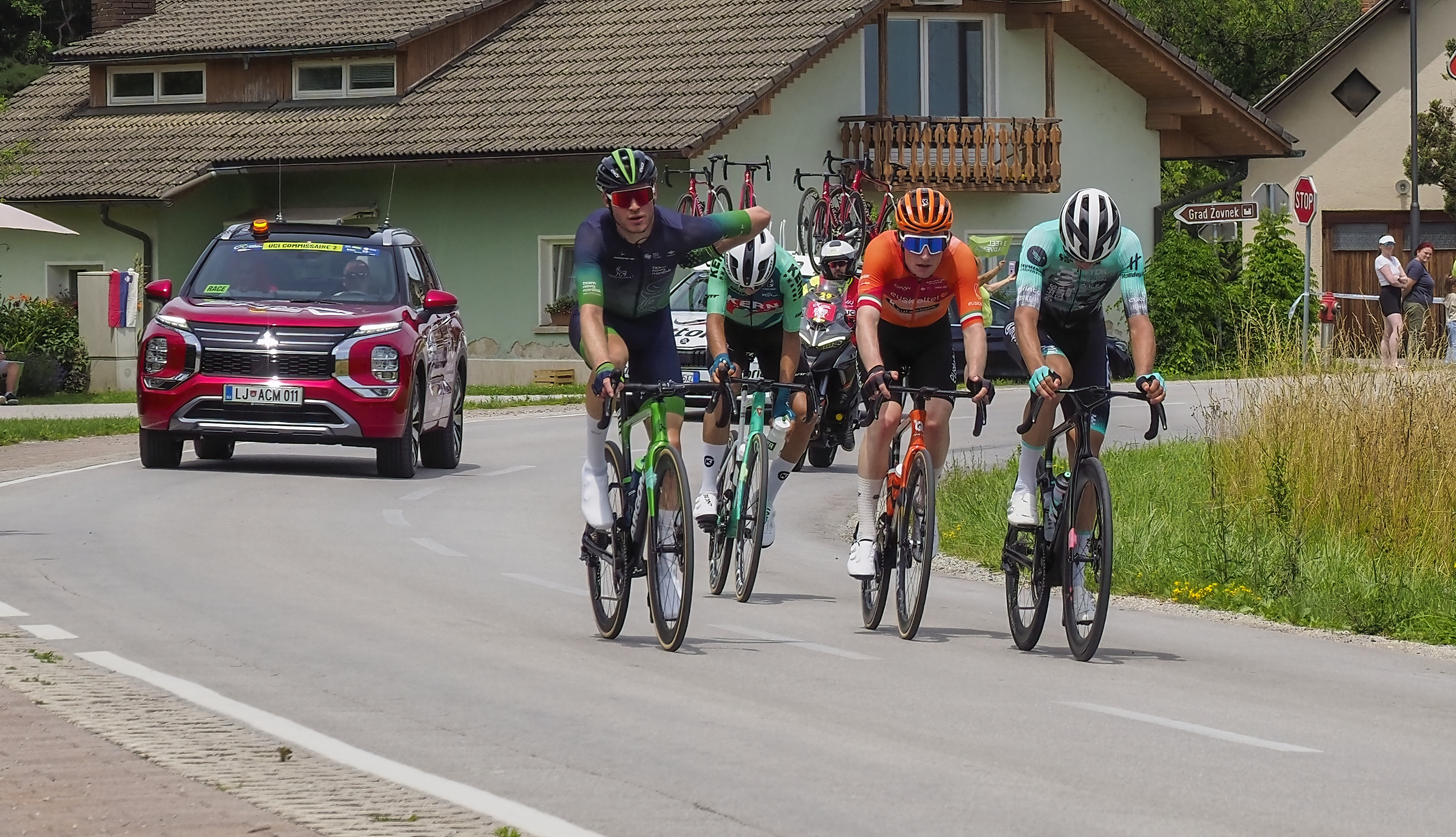
Breakaway group at Stage 1 (km 31)

17 June 2026 — Velenje to Rogaška Slatina, 141.6 km (88.0 mi)

Stage 1 ended in a bunch sprint, where team Red Bull–Bora–Hansgrohe claimed a first and second place, with Laurence Pithie's victory.

Stage 1 Result
Rank	Rider	Team	Time
1	Laurence Pithie (NZL)	Red Bull–Bora–Hansgrohe	3h 14' 10"
2	Arne Marit (BEL)	Red Bull–Bora–Hansgrohe	+ 0"
3	Edoardo Zambanini (ITA)	Team Bahrain Victorious	+ 0"
4	Stefano Oldani (ITA)	Caja Rural–Seguros RGA	+ 0"
5	Iván Cobo (ESP)	Equipo Kern Pharma	+ 0"
6	Joel Nicolau (ESP)	Caja Rural–Seguros RGA	+ 0"
7	Lorenzo Masciarelli (ITA)	MBH Bank CSB Telecom Fort	+ 0"
8	Tilen Finkšt (SLO)	Solution Tech NIPPO Rali	+ 0"
9	Xabier Berasategi (ESP)	Euskaltel–Euskadi	+ 0"
10	Mats Wenzel (AUT)	Equipo Kern Pharma	+ 0"

General classification after Stage 1
Rank	Rider	Team	Time
1	Laurence Pithie (NZL)	Red Bull–Bora–Hansgrohe	3h 14' 00"
2	Axel van der Tuuk (NED)	Euskaltel–Euskadi	+ 3"
3	Arne Marit (BEL)	Red Bull–Bora–Hansgrohe	+ 4"
4	Edoardo Zambanini (ITA)	Team Bahrain Victorious	+ 6"
5	Tomáš Přidal (CZE)	Team United Shipping	+ 6"
6	Stefano Oldani (ITA)	Caja Rural–Seguros RGA	+ 10"
7	Iván Cobo (ESP)	Equipo Kern Pharma	+ 10"
8	Joel Nicolau (ESP)	Caja Rural–Seguros RGA	+ 10"
9	Lorenzo Masciarelli (ITA)	MBH Bank CSB Telecom Fort	+ 10"
10	Tilen Finkšt (SLO)	Solution Tech NIPPO Rali	+ 10"

=== Stage 2 ===
The second stage ended similarly to the first, with a bunch sprint finish. Team Red Bull–Bora–Hansgrohe expected Laurence Pithie to win again, but were surprised by Serbian sprinter Dušan Rajović (Solution Tech NIPPO Rali), formerly a member of the Slovenian team Adria Mobil, who out-sprints Laurence Pithie.

Stage 2

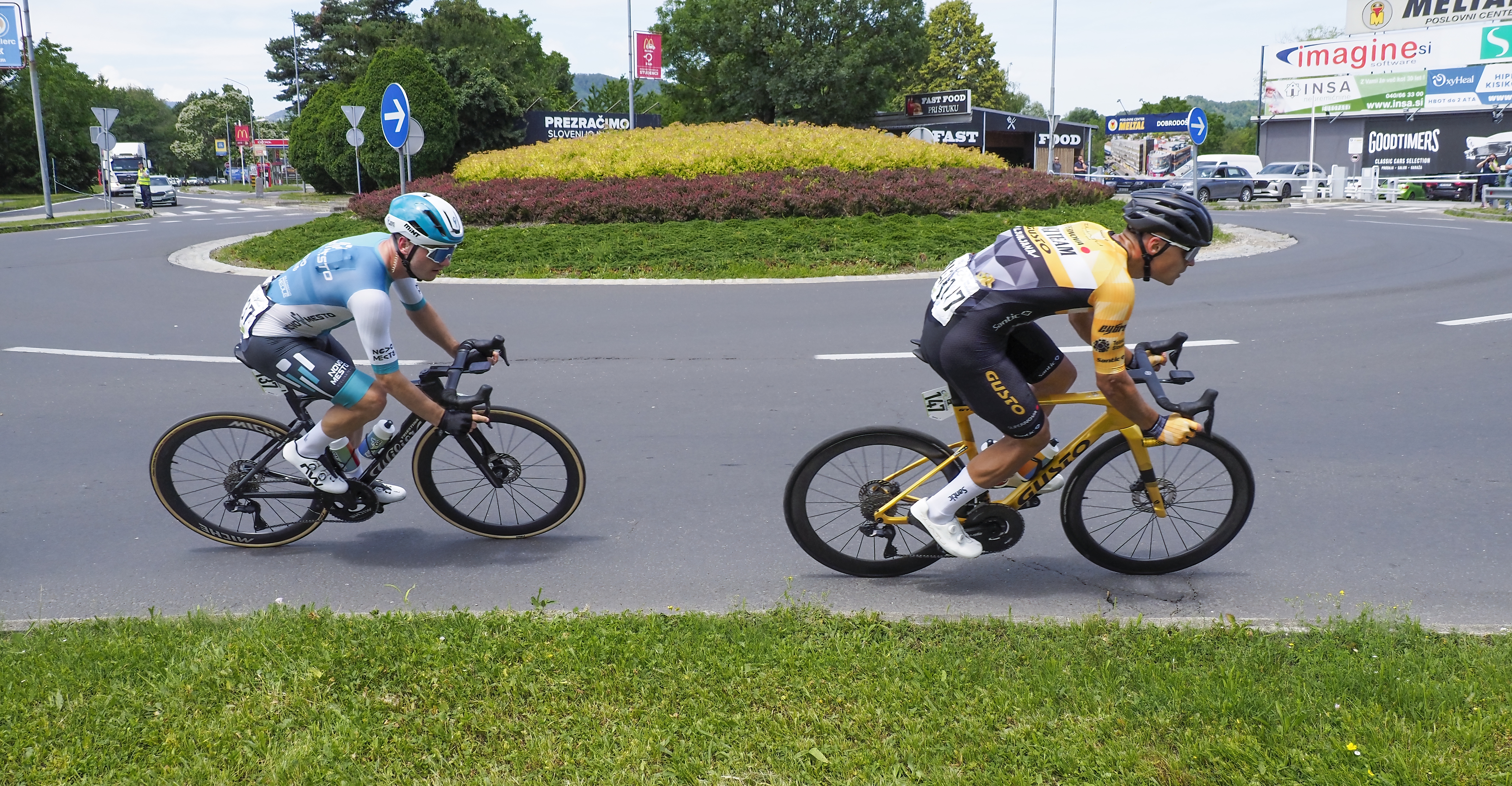
Breakaway group at Maribor (km 53)

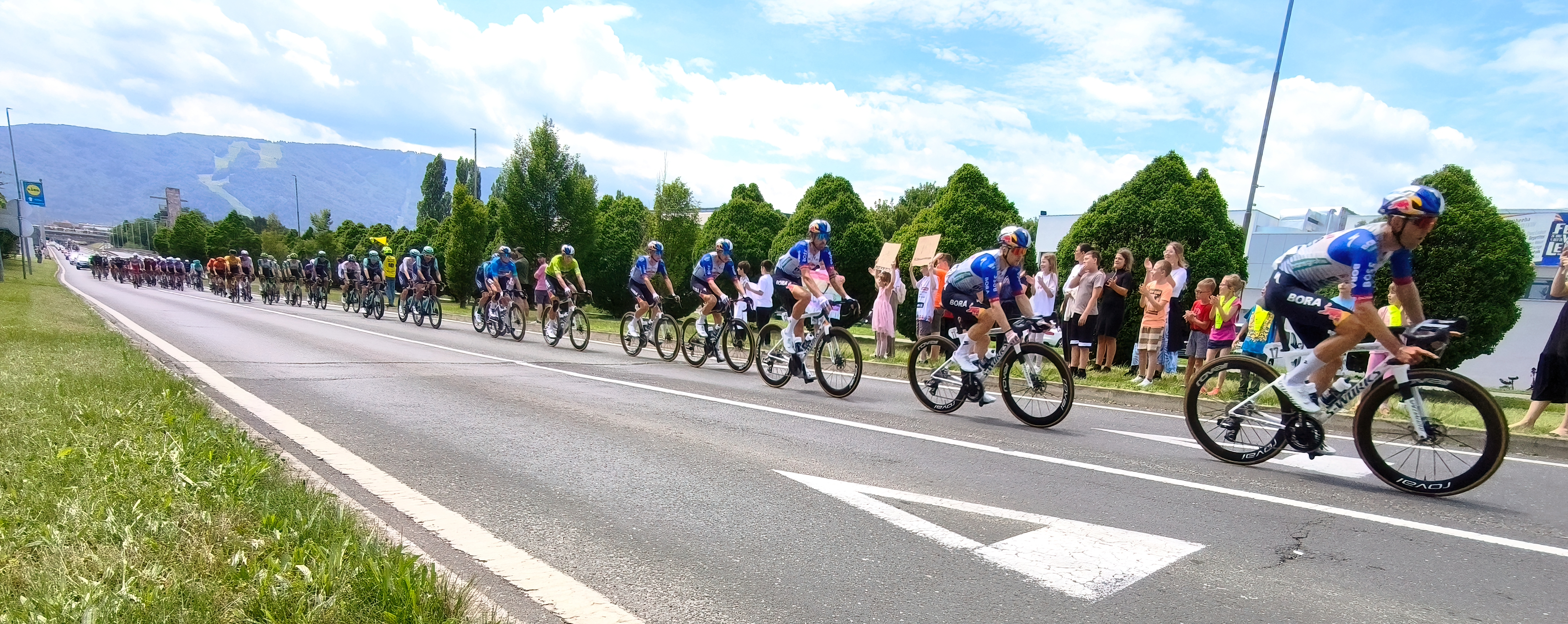
Team Red Bull–Bora–Hansgrohe pulling the peloton at Maribor (km 53)

18 June 2026 — Radlje ob Dravi to Ormož, 176.8 km (109.9 mi)

Stage 2 Result
Rank	Rider	Team	Time
1	Dušan Rajović (SRB)	Solution Tech NIPPO Rali	4h 20' 49"
2	Laurence Pithie (NZL)	Red Bull–Bora–Hansgrohe	+ 0"
3	Nikiforos Arvanitou (GRE)	Team United Shipping	+ 0"
4	Enrico Zanoncello (ITA)	Bardiani–CSF 7 Saber	+ 0"
5	Xabier Berasategi (ESP)	Euskaltel–Euskadi	+ 0"
6	Edoardo Zambanini (ITA)	Team Bahrain Victorious	+ 0"
7	Ben Oliver (NZL)	Modern Adventure Pro Cycling	+ 0"
8	Marcin Budziński (POL)	MBH Bank CSB Telecom Fort	+ 0"
9	Iván Cobo (ESP)	Equipo Kern Pharma	+ 0"
10	Stefano Oldani (ITA)	Caja Rural–Seguros RGA	+ 0"

General classification after Stage 2
Rank	Rider	Team	Time
1	Laurence Pithie (NZL)	Red Bull–Bora–Hansgrohe	7h 34' 43"
2	Axel van der Tuuk (NED)	Euskaltel–Euskadi	+ 9"
3	Arne Marit (BEL)	Red Bull–Bora–Hansgrohe	+ 10"
4	Edoardo Zambanini (ITA)	Team Bahrain Victorious	+ 12"
5	Tomáš Přidal (CZE)	Team United Shipping	+ 12"
6	Xabier Berasategi (ESP)	Euskaltel–Euskadi	+ 16"
7	Iván Cobo (ESP)	Equipo Kern Pharma	+ 16"
8	Stefano Oldani (ITA)	Caja Rural–Seguros RGA	+ 16"
9	Lorenzo Masciarelli (ITA)	MBH Bank CSB Telecom Fort	+ 16"
10	Francisco Muñoz (ESP)	Team Polti VisitMalta	+ 16"

=== Stage 3 ===
19 June 2026 — Maribor to Celje, 137 km (85 mi)

Second (tactical) victory in a bunch sprint for Laurence Pithie (Red Bull–Bora–Hansgrohe). Inside the final kilometre, teammate Mattia Cattaneo launched a surprise early attack. This forced rival teams (Equipo Kern Pharma) to expend energy chasing him down, perfectly setting up Laurence Pithie for the main sprint. Laurence Pithie proved his all-rounder capabilities by surviving the punchy climb of Celjska koča (Category 2 climb, 7.8 km at 6.1%) without losing contact with the front group.

Stage 3 Result
Rank	Rider	Team	Time
1	Laurence Pithie (NZL)	Red Bull–Bora–Hansgrohe	3h 27' 20"
2	Iván Cobo (ESP)	Equipo Kern Pharma	+ 0"
3	Stefano Oldani (ITA)	Caja Rural–Seguros RGA	+ 0"
4	Edoardo Zambanini (ITA)	Team Bahrain Victorious	+ 0"
5	Xabier Berasategi (ESP)	Euskaltel–Euskadi	+ 0"
6	Ben Oliver (NZL)	Modern Adventure Pro Cycling	+ 0"
7	Hugo de la Calle (ESP)	Burgos Burpellet BH	+ 0"
8	Mats Wenzel (LUX)	Equipo Kern Pharma	+ 26"
9	Lorenzo Masciarelli (ITA)	MBH Bank CSB Telecom Fort	+ 26"
10	Alessio Martinelli (ITA)	Bardiani–CSF 7 Saber	+ 0"

General classification after Stage 3
Rank	Rider	Team	Time
1	Laurence Pithie (NZL)	Red Bull–Bora–Hansgrohe	11h 01' 53"
2	Iván Cobo (ESP)	Equipo Kern Pharma	+ 20"
3	Edoardo Zambanini (ITA)	Team Bahrain Victorious	+ 22"
4	Stefano Oldani (ITA)	Caja Rural–Seguros RGA	+ 22"
5	Tomáš Přidal (CZE)	Team United Shipping	+ 22"
6	Xabier Berasategi (ESP)	Euskaltel–Euskadi	+ 26"
7	Lorenzo Masciarelli (ITA)	MBH Bank CSB Telecom Fort	+ 26"
8	Mats Wenzel (LUX)	Equipo Kern Pharma	+ 26"
9	Gotzon Martín (ESP)	Euskaltel–Euskadi	+ 26"
10	Francisco Muñoz (ESP)	Team Polti VisitMalta	+ 26"

=== Stage 4 ===
20 June 2026 — Kranj to Kranjska Gora, 183.1 km (113.8 mi)

Stage 4

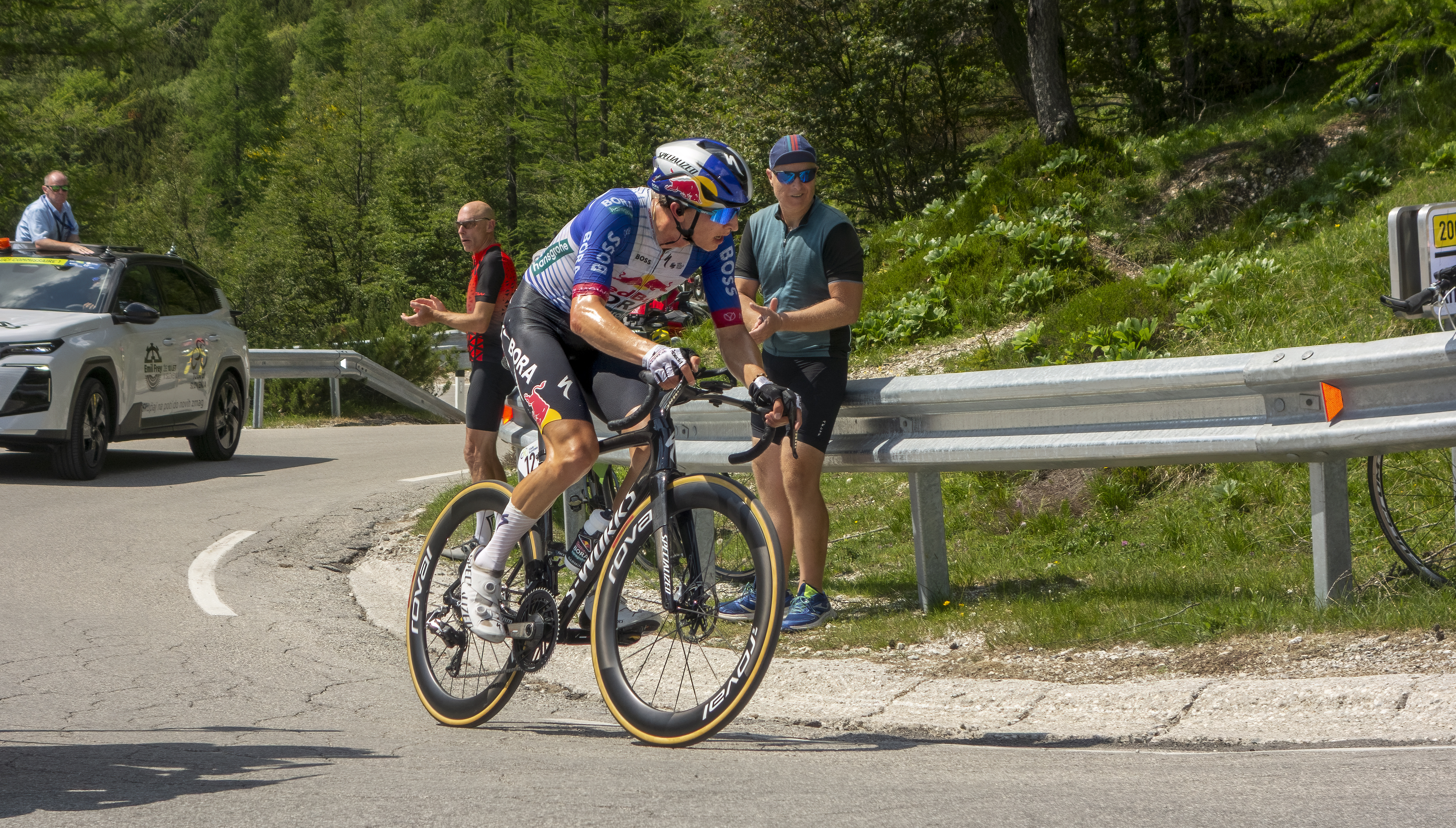
Florian Lipowitz (Red Bull–Bora–Hansgrohe) leading to Hors catégorie climb on Vršič Pass (1611 m), 13 km before the finish (winner of Stage 4)...

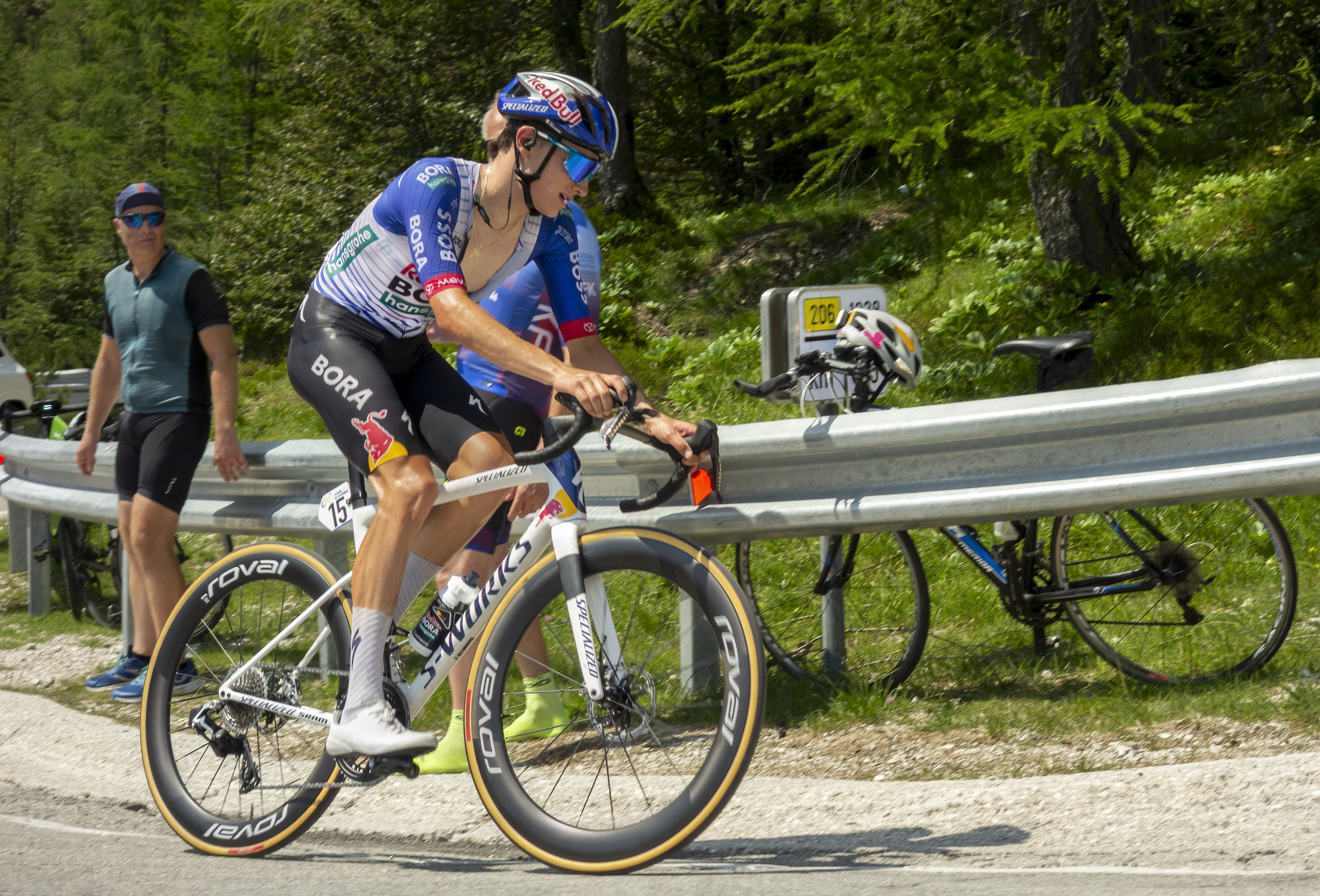
...Giulio Pellizzari (team Red Bull-Bora-hansgrohe) was second on Vršič's summit, but caught teammate Florian Lipowitz on the descent, and they crossed the finish line together...

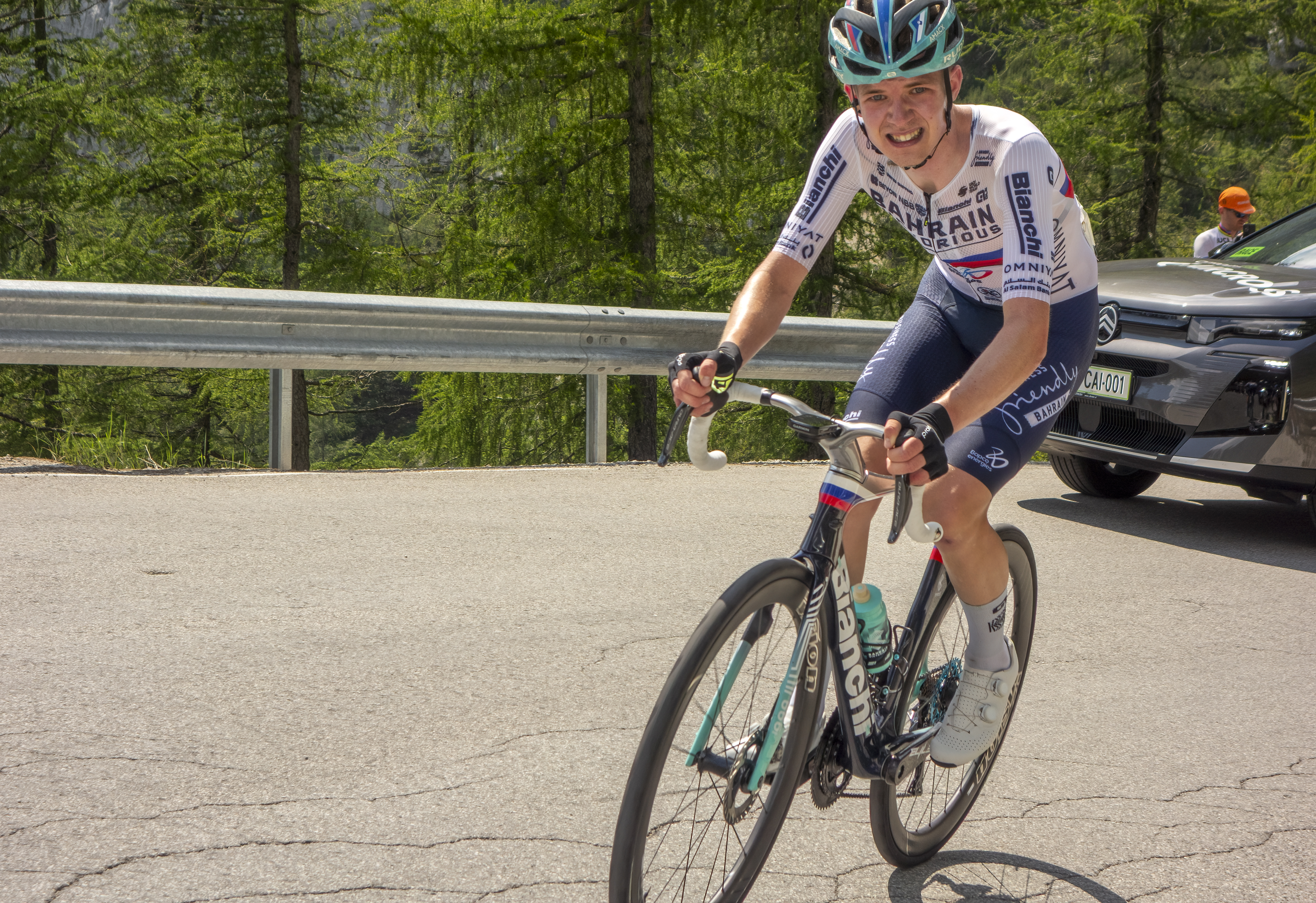
...Jakob Omrzel (Team Bahrain Victorious) was in third place at the Vršič summit, around 1:40 behind Lipowitz, but cut the deficit to 40 seconds on the descent.

Stage 4 was the Queen stage of the race, featuring the climb Dražgoše (category 2 climb; 4,1 km at 7.9%, with the summit at 816 m), Predel Pass (category 3 climb; 2,4 km at 7.7%, with the summit at 1156 m) and finally - most known Pass in Slovenia - Vršič Pass (HC category climb; 7.7 km at 12.6%, with the summit at 1611 m) in Julian Alps.

Stage 4 determined the overall winner, setting the stage for a highly anticipated duel between Jakob Omrzel (Red Bull–Bora–Hansgrohe) and Florian Lipowitz (Red Bull–Bora–Hansgrohe). At the end duo (Lipowitz, Pellizzari) from Bora team was too strong for Omrzel, who came at third place 1' 26" behind the winner.

Stage 4 Result
Rank	Rider	Team	Time
1	Florian Lipowitz (GER)	Red Bull–Bora–Hansgrohe	4h 40' 29"
2	Giulio Pellizzari (ITA)	Red Bull–Bora–Hansgrohe	+ 0"
3	Jakob Omrzel (SLO)	Team Bahrain Victorious	+ 1' 26"
4	Hugo de la Calle (ESP)	Burgos Burpellet BH	+ 1' 58"
5	Samuel Fernández (ESP)	Caja Rural–Seguros RGA	+ 2' 09"
6	Alessandro Fancellu (ITA)	MBH Bank CSB Telecom Fort	+ 2' 09"
7	Sebastian Berwick (AUS)	Caja Rural–Seguros RGA	+ 2' 11"
8	Joel Nicolau (ESP)	Caja Rural–Seguros RGA	+ 2' 40"
9	Alex Tolio (ITA)	Bardiani–CSF 7 Saber	+ 2' 40"
10	Jon Agirre (ESP)	Euskaltel–Euskadi	+ 2' 43"

General classification after Stage 4
Rank	Rider	Team	Time
1	Florian Lipowitz (GER)	Red Bull–Bora–Hansgrohe	15h 42' 38"
2	Giulio Pellizzari (ITA)	Red Bull–Bora–Hansgrohe	+ 4"
3	Jakob Omrzel (SLO)	Team Bahrain Victorious	+ 1' 32"
4	Alessandro Fancellu (ITA)	MBH Bank CSB Telecom Fort	+ 2' 19"
5	Samuel Fernández (ESP)	Caja Rural–Seguros RGA	+ 2' 19"
6	Sebastian Berwick (AUS)	Caja Rural–Seguros RGA	+ 2' 21"
7	Joel Nicolau (ESP)	Caja Rural–Seguros RGA	+ 2' 47"
8	Alex Tolio (ITA)	Bardiani–CSF 7 Saber	+ 2' 50"
9	Luca Covili (ITA)	Bardiani–CSF 7 Saber	+ 3' 03"
10	Iván Cobo (ESP)	Equipo Kern Pharma	+ 3' 41"

=== Stage 5 ===
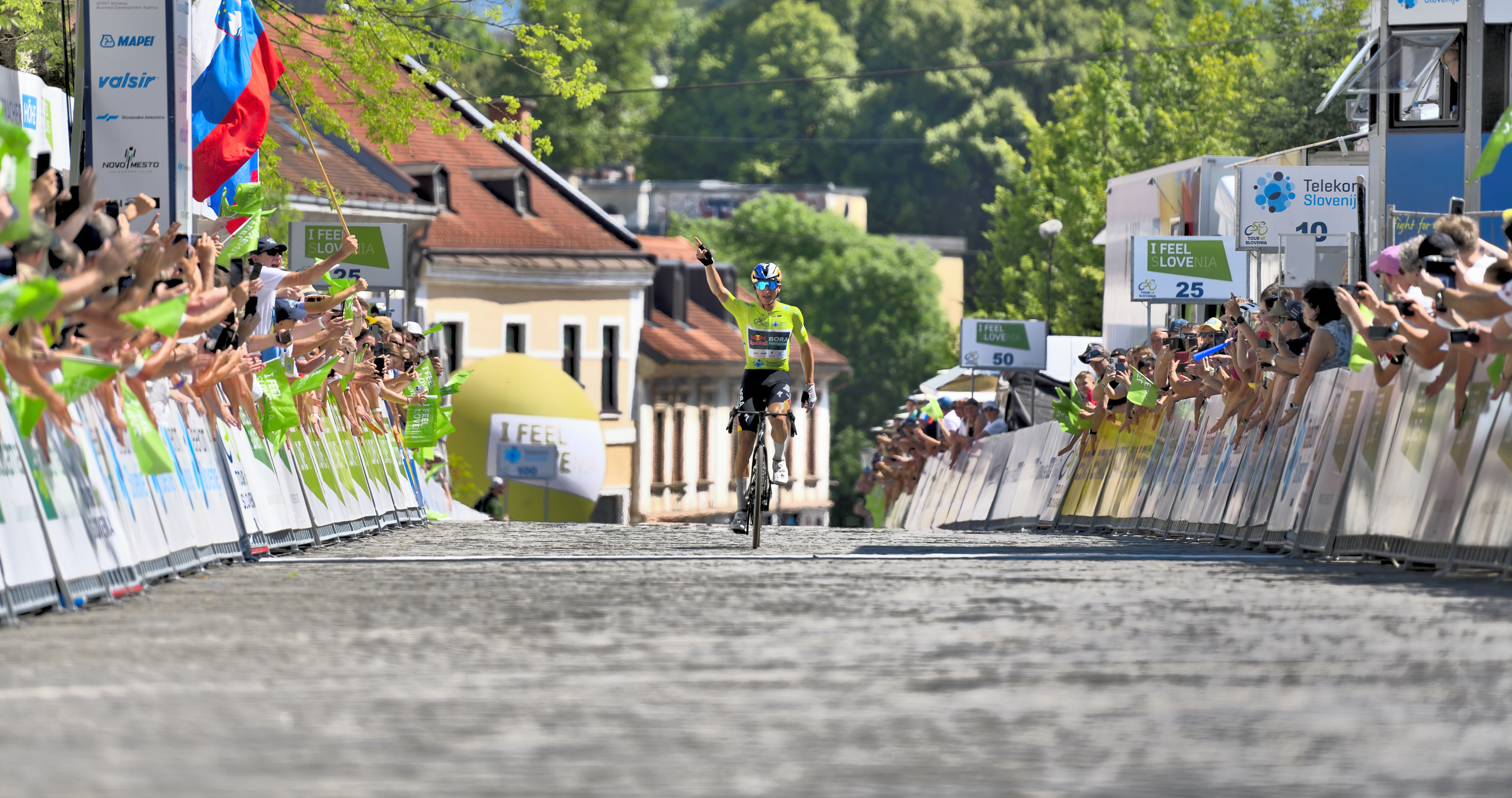
Florian Lipowitz (Red Bull–Bora–Hansgrohe) secures Stage 5 victory in Novo Mesto and claims the overall 2026 Tour of Slovenia title

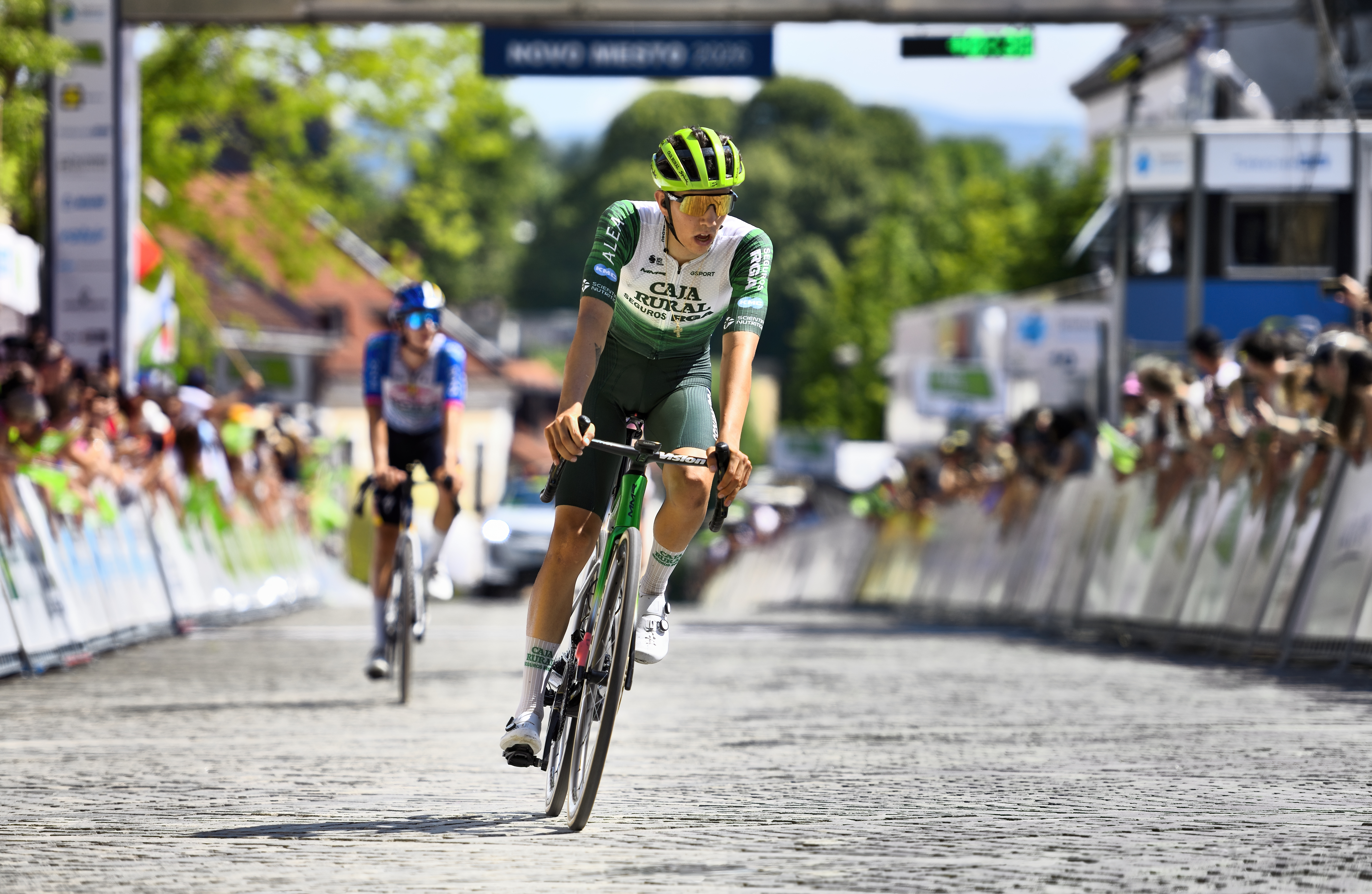
Samuel Fernandez Garcia (Caja Rural–Seguros RGA) at the finish of Stage 5 in Novo mesto

21 June 2026 — Litija to Novo Mesto, 162.1 km (100.7 mi)

The final stage, which starts in Litija (region Lower Carniola), crosses the Vače hill (category 2 climb; 5,6 km at 6.1%, with the summit at 596 m) and traditionally ends in Novo Mesto, the unofficial cycling capital of Slovenia. The last selection before the finish is the climb to Trška gora (category 2 climb; 1,7 km at 9.5%, max. climb 21%, with the summit at 357 m).

Breakaway group was formed early in the Stage 5, consisted of Fausto Masnada (MBH Bank CSB Telecom Fort), David Sutton (Euskaltel–Euskadi) and Veljko Stojnić (Team United Shipping). Later Fausto Masnada went solo and having 2 minutes before Peloton and with taking flying finish on Trebelno virtually wore the Blue jersey of the Mountain points classification. Red Bull–Bora–Hansgrohe picked up the pace and caught Fausto Masnada 27 km from the finish, and before the final climb to Trška Gora, where Florian Lipowitz won the flying finish and retook the Blue Jersey of the Mountain points classification from Fausto Madnada and soloed to victory in Novo mesto. This was the first time that the winner of a stage had also won Trška Gora. Bora showed their superiority (again) by taking first and second place in the stage - Florian Lipowitz and Laurence Pithie.

Red Bull–Bora–Hansgrohe dominated the five-day Tour of Slovenia, winning 4 of the 5 stages, taking first and second Overall, and securing the Points, Mountains, and Team classifications. Stage 2 was the only exception, won by Serbian rider Dušan Rajović (Solution Tech NIPPO Rali) while Slovenian Jakob Omrzel (Team Bahrain Victorious) won the White jersey for best young rider and took third place Overall.

Stage 5 Result
Rank	Rider	Team	Time
1	Florian Lipowitz (GER)	Red Bull–Bora–Hansgrohe	4h 03' 16"
2	Laurence Pithie (NZL)	Red Bull–Bora–Hansgrohe	+ 24"
3	Alessandro Fancellu (ITA)	MBH Bank CSB Telecom Fort	+ 24"
4	Joel Nicolau (ESP)	Caja Rural–Seguros RGA	+ 24"
5	Ivan Cobo (ESP)	Equipo Kern Pharma	+ 24"
6	Hugo de la Calle (ESP)	Burgos Burpellet BH	+ 24"
7	Sebastian Berwick (AUS)	Caja Rural–Seguros RGA	+ 24"
8	Alex Tolio (ITA)	Bardiani–CSF 7 Saber	+ 24"
9	Jakob Omrzel (SLO)	Team Bahrain Victorious	+ 24"
10	Luca Covili (ITA)	Bardiani–CSF 7 Saber	+ 24"

Final general classification
Rank	Rider	Team	Time
1	Florian Lipowitz (GER)	Red Bull–Bora–Hansgrohe	19h 45' 44"
2	Giulio Pellizzari (ITA)	Red Bull–Bora–Hansgrohe	+ 42"
3	Jakob Omrzel (SLO)	Team Bahrain Victorious	+ 2' 06"
4	Alessandro Fancellu (ITA)	MBH Bank CSB Telecom Fort	+ 2' 49"
5	Sebastian Berwick (AUS)	Caja Rural–Seguros RGA	+ 2' 55"
6	Samuel Fernández (ESP)	Caja Rural–Seguros RGA	+ 2' 57"
7	Joel Nicolau (ESP)	Caja Rural–Seguros RGA	+ 3' 21"
8	Alex Tolio (ITA)	Bardiani–CSF 7 Saber	+ 3' 24"
9	Luca Covili (ITA)	Bardiani–CSF 7 Saber	+ 3' 37"
10	Iván Cobo (ESP)	Equipo Kern Pharma	+ 4' 15"

== Classification leadership ==
Classification leadership by stage
Stage	Winner	General classification	Points classification	Mountains classification	Young rider classification	Team classification
1	Laurence Pithie	Laurence Pithie	Laurence Pithie	Tomáš Přidal	Tomáš Přidal	Caja Rural–Seguros RGA
2	Dušan Rajović	Laurence Pithie	Laurence Pithie	Zsombor Palumby	Tomáš Přidal	Caja Rural–Seguros RGA
3	Laurence Pithie	Laurence Pithie	Laurence Pithie	Samuel Fernández	Tomáš Přidal	Euskaltel–Euskadi
4	Florian Lipowitz	Florian Lipowitz	Laurence Pithie	Florian Lipowitz	Jakob Omrzel	Red Bull–Bora–Hansgrohe
5	Florian Lipowitz	Florian Lipowitz	Laurence Pithie	Florian Lipowitz	Jakob Omrzel	Red Bull–Bora–Hansgrohe
Final		Florian Lipowitz	Laurence Pithie	Florian Lipowitz	Jakob Omrzel	Red Bull–Bora–Hansgrohe

== Classification standings ==
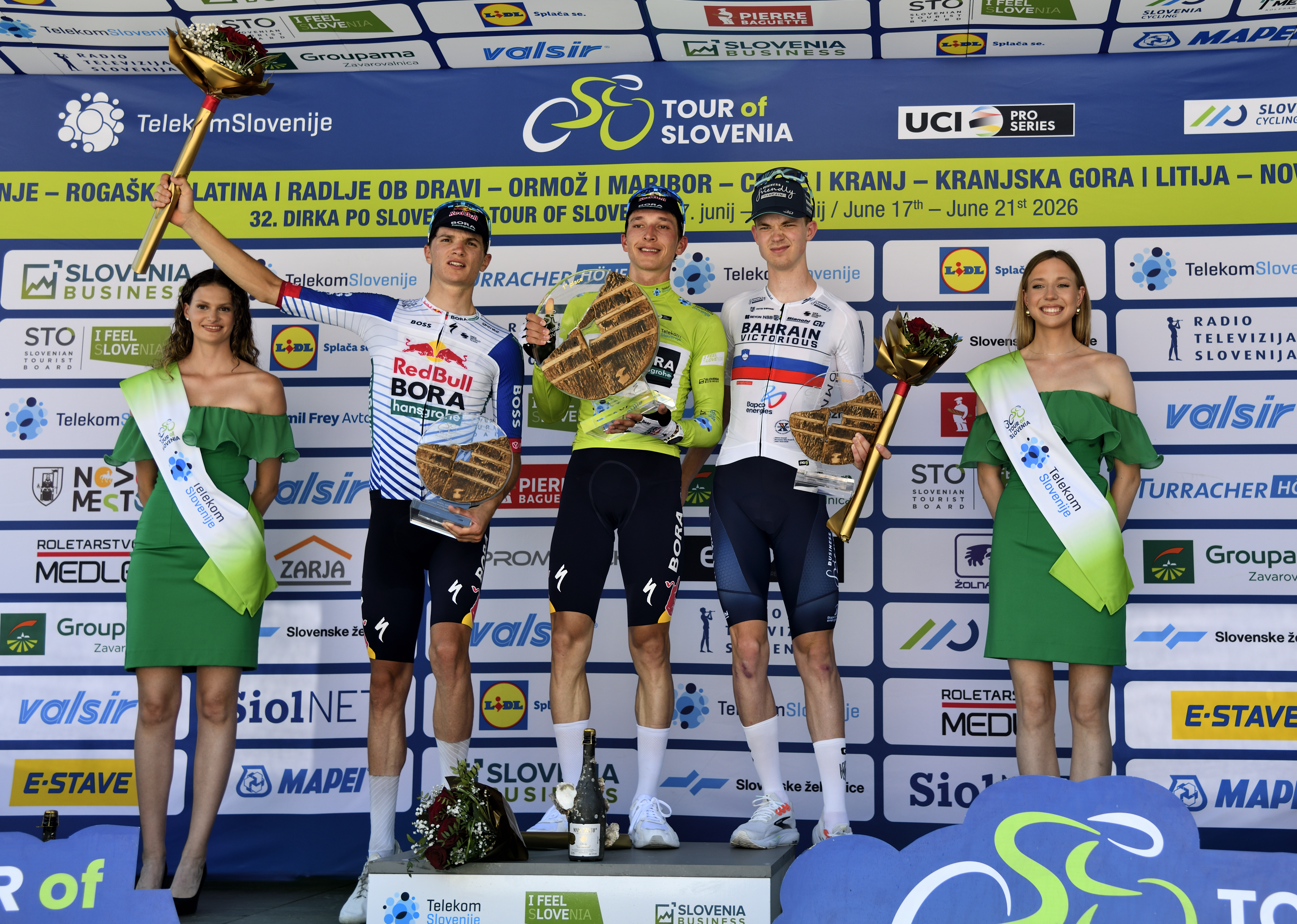
2026 Tour of Slovenia podium (first place Florian Lipowitz, second place Giulio Pellizzari, third place Jakob Omrzel)

Legend
Denotes the leader of the general classification	Denotes the leader of the points classification
Denotes the leader of the mountains classification	Denotes the leader of the young rider classification

=== General classification ===
Final general classification (1–10)
Rank	Rider	Team	Time
1	Florian Lipowitz (GER)	Red Bull–Bora–Hansgrohe	19h 45' 44"
2	Giulio Pellizzari (ITA)	Red Bull–Bora–Hansgrohe	+ 42"
3	Jakob Omrzel (SLO)	Team Bahrain Victorious	+ 2' 06"
4	Alessandro Fancellu (ITA)	MBH Bank CSB Telecom Fort	+ 2' 49"
5	Sebastian Berwick (AUS)	Caja Rural–Seguros RGA	+ 2' 55"
6	Samuel Fernández (ESP)	Caja Rural–Seguros RGA	+ 2' 57"
7	Joel Nicolau (ESP)	Caja Rural–Seguros RGA	+ 3' 21"
8	Alex Tolio (ITA)	Bardiani–CSF 7 Saber	+ 3' 24"
9	Luca Covili (ITA)	Bardiani–CSF 7 Saber	+ 3' 37"
10	Iván Cobo (ESP)	Equipo Kern Pharma	+ 4' 15"

=== Points classification ===
Final points classification (1–10)
Rank	Rider	Team	Points
1	Laurence Pithie (NZL)	Red Bull–Bora–Hansgrohe	90
2	Iván Cobo (ESP)	Equipo Kern Pharma	55
3	Florian Lipowitz (GER)	Red Bull–Bora–Hansgrohe	50
4	Joel Nicolau (ESP)	Caja Rural–Seguros RGA	37
5	Stefano Oldani (ITA)	Caja Rural–Seguros RGA	36
6	Hugo de la Calle (ESP)	Burgos Burpellet BH	33
7	Alessandro Fancellu (ITA)	MBH Bank CSB Telecom Fort	32
8	Xabier Berasategi (ESP)	Euskaltel–Euskadi	31
9	Fausto Masnada (ITA)	MBH Bank CSB Telecom Fort	23
10	Jakob Omrzel (SLO)	Team Bahrain Victorious	23

=== Mountains classification ===
Final mountains classification (1–10)
Rank	Rider	Team	Points
1	Florian Lipowitz (GER)	Red Bull–Bora–Hansgrohe	23
2	Fausto Masnada (ITA)	MBH Bank CSB Telecom Fort	21
3	Jon Agirre (ESP)	Euskaltel–Euskadi	15
4	Giulio Pellizzari (ITA)	Red Bull–Bora–Hansgrohe	12
5	Jakob Omrzel (SLO)	Team Bahrain Victorious	11
6	Louis Sutton (GBR)	Euskaltel–Euskadi	9
7	Samuel Fernández (ESP)	Caja Rural–Seguros RGA	8
8	Sebastian Berwick (AUS)	Caja Rural–Seguros RGA	8
9	Hugo de la Calle (ESP)	Burgos Burpellet BH	8
10	Veljko Stojnić (SRB)	Team United Shipping	5

=== Young rider classification ===
Final young rider classification (1–10)
Rank	Rider	Team	Time
1	Jakob Omrzel (SLO)	Team Bahrain Victorious	19h 47' 50"
2	Hugo de la Calle (ESP)	Burgos Burpellet BH	+ 3' 23"
3	Tomáš Přidal (CZE)	Team United Shipping	+ 5' 54"
4	Roman Ermakov (SLO)	Team Bahrain Victorious	+ 13' 03"
5	Max van der Meulen (NED)	Team Bahrain Victorious	+ 14' 14"
6	Jon Pritržnik (SLO)	Pogi Team Gusto Ljubljana	+ 28' 27"
7	Nicolas Gojković (CRO)	Pogi Team Gusto Ljubljana	+ 28' 41"
8	Jaka Marolt (SLO)	Factor Racing	+ 30' 00"
9	Fabrizio Crozzolo (ARG)	Team Polti VisitMalta	+ 30' 14"
10	Gasper Stajnar (SLO)	Pogi Team Gusto Ljubljana	+ 33' 43"

=== Team classification ===
Final team classification (1–10)
Rank	Team	Time
1	(Germany) Red Bull–Bora–Hansgrohe	59h 23' 20"
2	(Spain) Caja Rural–Seguros RGA	+ 3' 08"
3	(Hungary) MBH Bank CSB Telecom Fort	+ 9' 33"
4	(Spain) Euskaltel–Euskadi	+ 10' 16"
5	(Spain) Equipo Kern Pharma	+ 10' 24"
6	(Spain) Burgos Burpellet BH	+ 15' 35"
7	Team Bahrain Victorious	+ 16' 58"
8	(Italy) Team Polti VisitMalta	+ 20' 34"
9	(Italy) Bardiani–CSF 7 Saber	+ 32' 54"
10	(Hungary) Team United Shipping	+ 1h 04' 24"

Classification winners

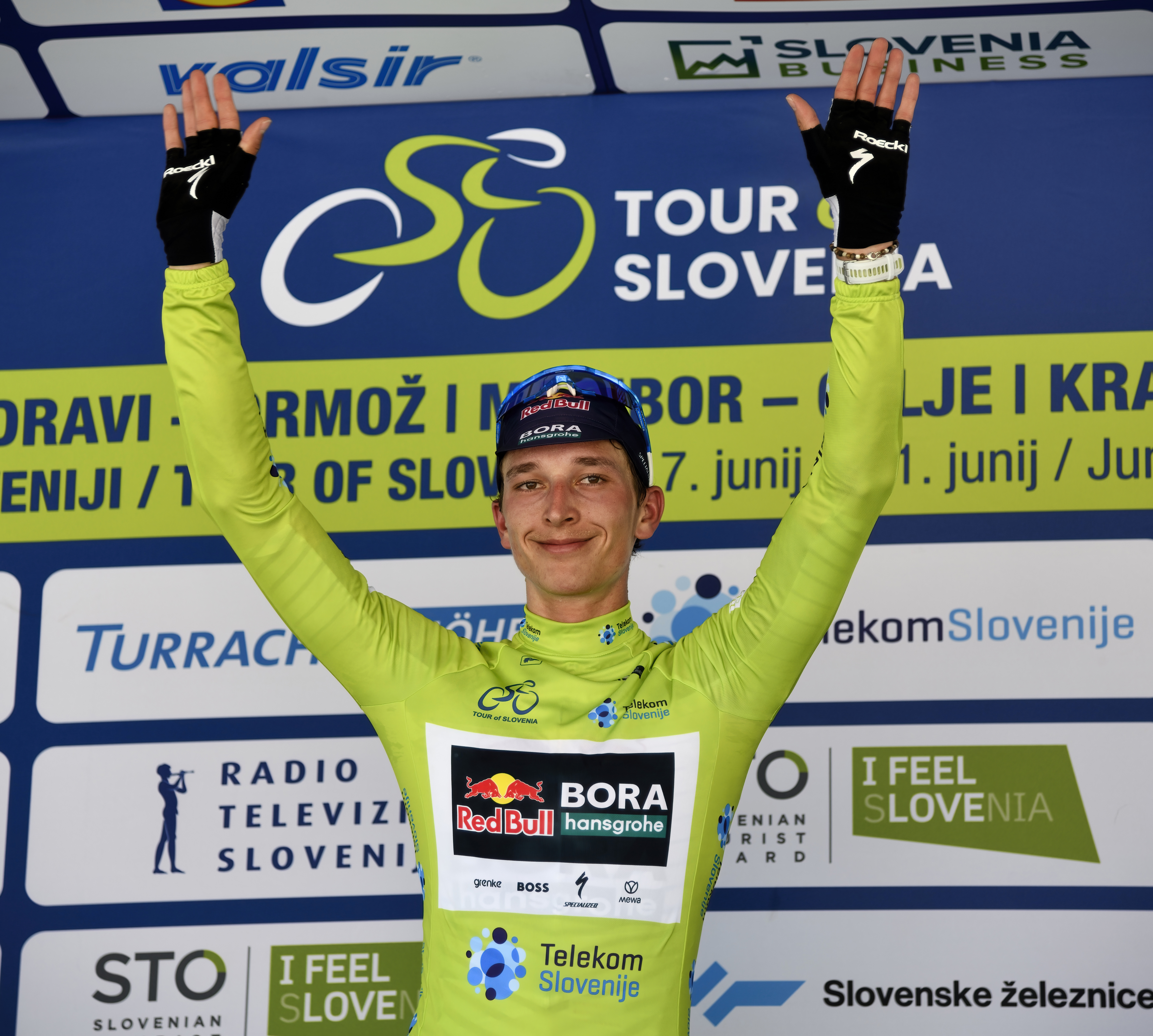
General
Florian Lipowitz

(Red Bull–Bora–Hansgrohe)

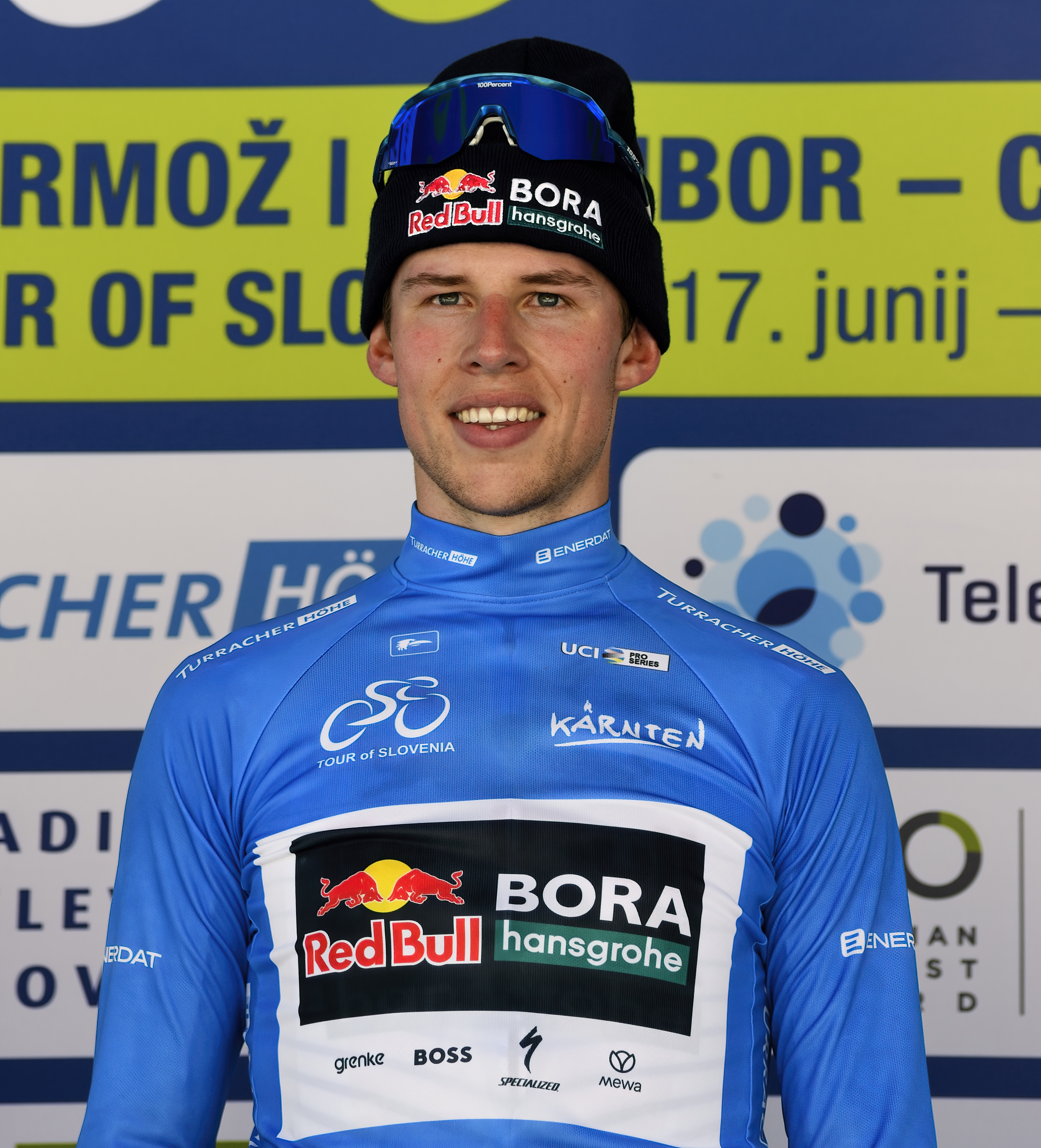
Points
Laurence Pithie

(Red Bull–Bora–Hansgrohe)

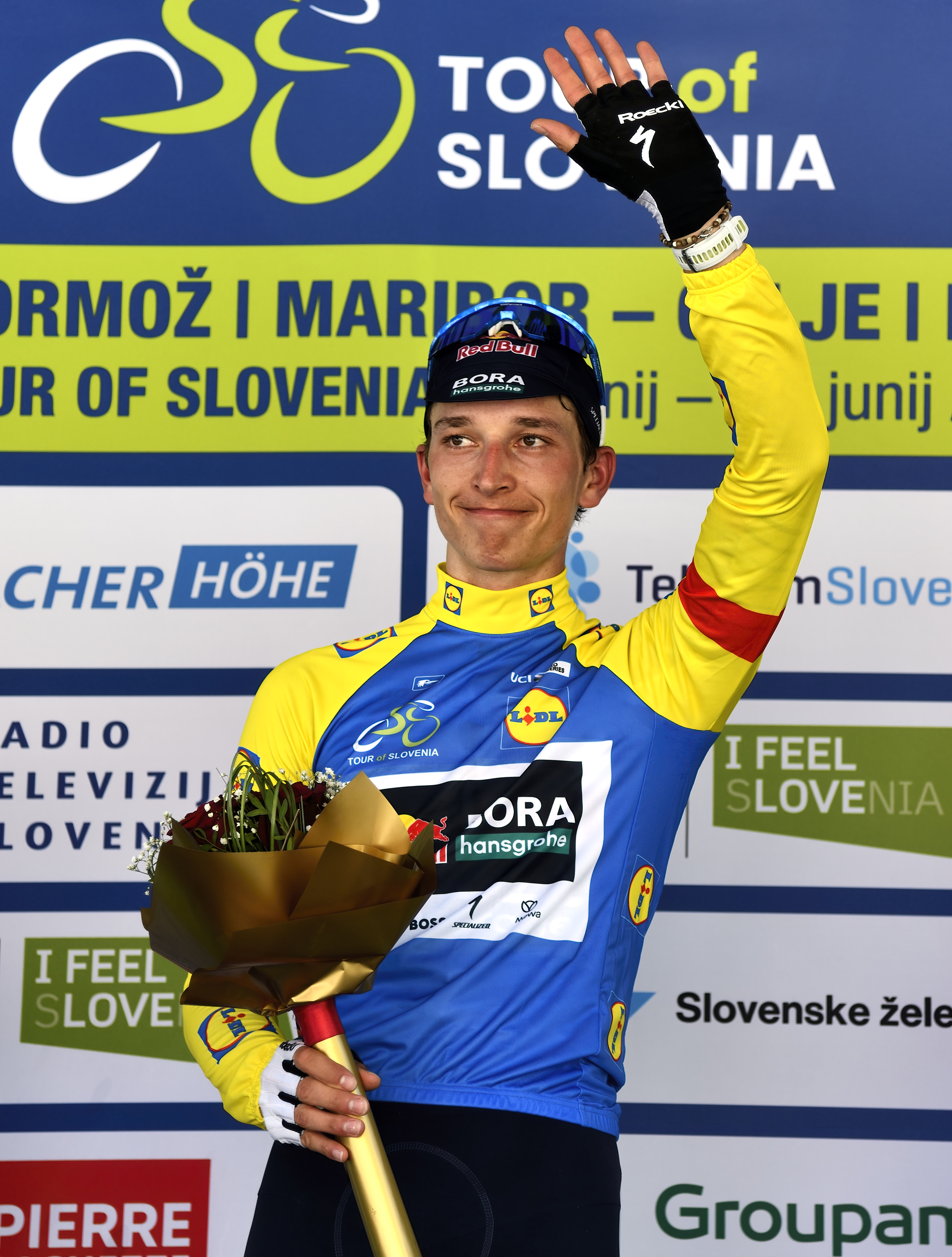
Mountains
Florian Lipowitz

(Red Bull–Bora–Hansgrohe)

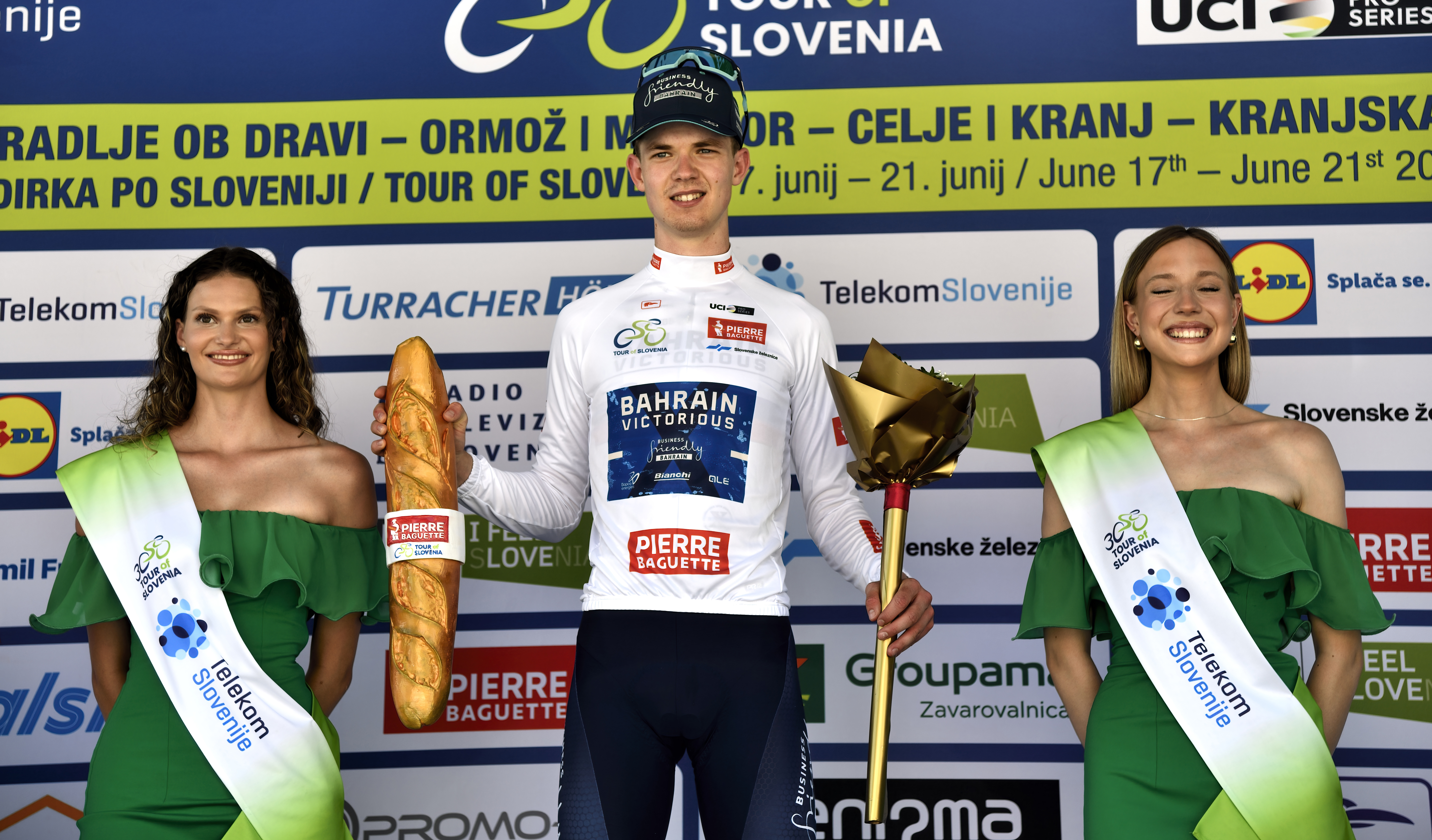
Young rider
Jakob Omrzel

(Team Bahrain Victorious)

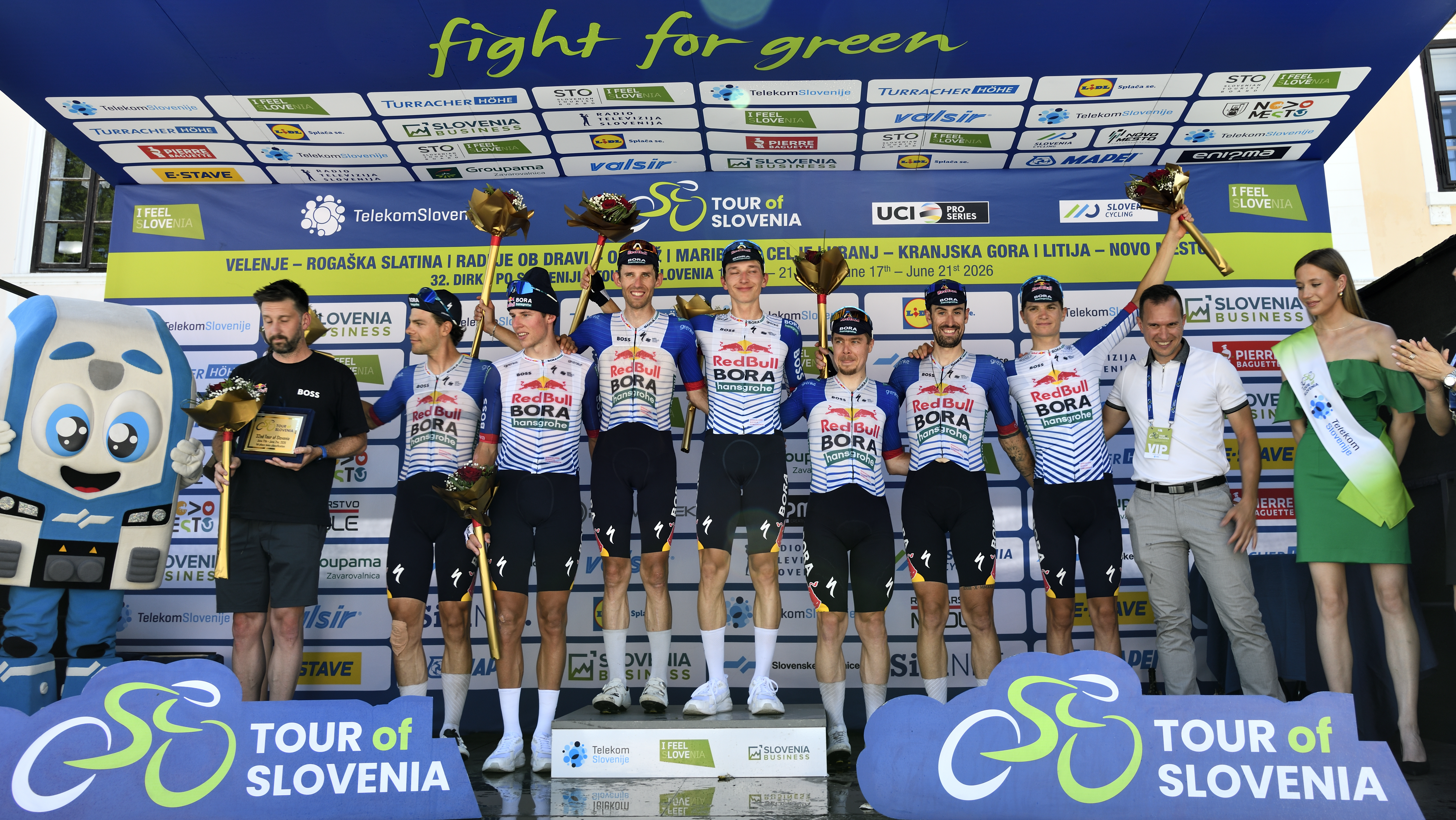
Team Red Bull–Bora–Hansgrohe
