= Joel Nicolau =

Spanish cyclist (born 1997)

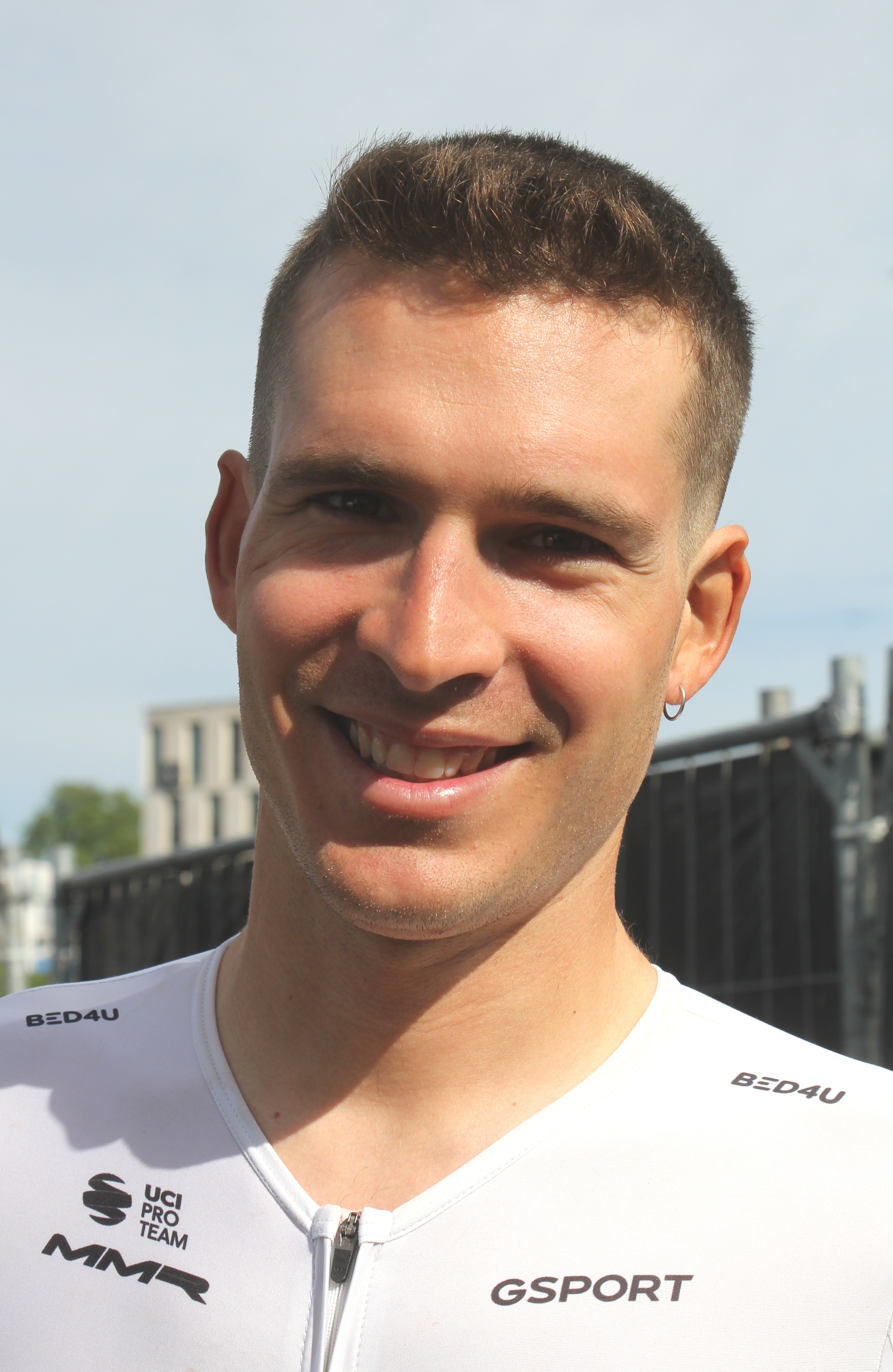
- Nicolau at the 2024 Rund um Köln

Personal information
- Full name: Joel Nicolau Beltrán
- Born: 23 December 1997 (age 28) Llofriu, Spain
- Height: 1.76 m (5 ft 9 in)
- Weight: 66 kg (146 lb)

Cycling career
- Sport: Cycling
- Current team: Caja Rural–Seguros RGA
- Discipline: Road
- Role: Rider
- Rider type: Climber

Amateur teams
- 2017: Compak–KC Sport
- 2018–2019: Caja Rural–Seguros RGA Amateur

Professional team
- 2019–: Caja Rural–Seguros RGA

Major wins
- Grand Tours Vuelta a España Combativity award (2025)

Joel Nicolau Beltrán (born 23 December 1997 in Llofriu) is a Spanish cyclist, who currently rides for UCI ProTeam Caja Rural–Seguros RGA.

== Major results ==
2021
8th Overall CRO Race
2022
1st Mountains classification, Tour of Norway
1st Mountains classification, Tour de Luxembourg
8th Overall Tour of Slovenia
2023
1st Mountains classification, Tour of Norway
Combativity award Stage 16 Vuelta a España
2024
7th Veenendaal–Veenendaal
7th Boucles de l'Aulne
8th GP Industria & Artigianato di Larciano
10th Tour du Finistère
2025
4th Overall CRO Race
8th Grand Prix du Morbihan
Vuelta a España

Held after Stages 4–5
Combativity award Overall

2026
2nd Road race, National Road Championships
7th Overall Tour of Slovenia

=== Grand Tour general classification results timeline ===
Grand Tour	2023	2024	2025	2026
Giro d'Italia	—	—	—	—
Tour de France	—	—	—	IP
Vuelta a España	100	—	111	—

Legend
—	Did not compete
DNF	Did not finish
