= Trška Gora, Krško =

Trška Gora
- Location in Slovenia
- Coordinates: 45°57′19.91″N 15°28′41.1″E
- Country: Slovenia
- Traditional region: Lower Carniola
- Statistical region: Lower Sava
- Municipality: Krško

Area
  - Total: 2.42 km^{2} (0.93 sq mi)
- Elevation: 253 m (830 ft)

Population (2002)
  - Total: 142
- Postal code: 8270

Trška Gora (pronounced [ˈtəɾʃka ˈɡɔːɾa]; German: Stadtberg) is a settlement in the hills above the right bank of the Sava River, opposite Krško in eastern Slovenia. The area is part of the traditional region of Lower Carniola. It is now included with the rest of the municipality in the Lower Sava Statistical Region.

== Name ==
The name Trška Gora literally means 'market town mountain' (the adjective trški comes from the common noun trg 'market town'), referring to its topography and position adjacent to the town of Krško. This etymology is shared with the village of Trška Gora in the Municipality of Novo Mesto. The German name Stadtberg (literally, 'town mountain') has the same semantic basis.

== Church ==
The local church is dedicated to Saint Joseph and belongs to the Parish of Krško. It is an early Baroque building with a low belfry dating to the 17th century with early 18th-century adaptations.
