= Hopplà–Petroli Firenze–Don Camillo =

Italian cycling team

Team information
- UCI code: CPH
- Registered: Italy
- Founded: 2019
- Discipline: Road
- Status: National (2019, 2021–); UCI Continental (2020)

Team name history
- 2019 2020– 2021 2022 2023–: Casillo–Maserati; Casillo–Petroli Firenze–Hopplà; Petroli Firenze–Hopplà–Don Camillo; Casillo–Petroli Firenze–Hopplà; Hopplà–Petroli Firenze–Don Camillo

Hopplà–Petroli Firenze–Don Camillo (UCI code: CPH) is an Italian cycling team founded in 2019. The team was amateur in 2019, and gained UCI Continental status in 2020, and returned to club status the following year.

== Team roster ==
As of 30 November 2020.

Rider	Date of birth
Pasquale Abenante (ITA)	27 February 1998 (age 28)
Gabriele Benedetti (ITA)	9 June 2000 (age 26)
Samuele Carpene (ITA)	31 March 2000 (age 26)
Lorenzo Cataldo (ITA)	7 November 1999 (age 26)
Andrea Cervellera (ITA)	23 December 1998 (age 27)
Luca Coati (ITA)	30 November 1999 (age 26)
Edoardo Faresin (ITA)	11 March 1998 (age 28)
Davide Ferrari (ITA)	8 September 1999 (age 26)

Rider	Date of birth
Moreno Marchetti (ITA)	27 April 1998 (age 28)
Marco Murgano (ITA)	29 March 1998 (age 28)
Alex Raimondi (ITA)	30 March 2000 (age 26)
Laurent Rigollet (ITA)	23 August 1999 (age 27)
Frederik Thomsen (DEN)	3 October 2000 (age 25)
Alex Tolio (ITA)	30 March 2000 (age 26)
Alessandro Verre (ITA)	17 November 2001 (age 24)
Matteo Zurlo (ITA)	1 August 1998 (age 28)
