= Iván Cobo =

Spanish cyclist (born 2000)

Personal information
- Full name: Iván Cobo Cayón
- Born: 2 January 2000 (age 26) El Astillero, Spain
- Height: 1.86 m (6 ft 1 in)
- Weight: 64 kg (141 lb)

Cycling career
- Sport: Cycling
- Current team: Equipo Kern Pharma
- Discipline: Road
- Role: Rider
- Rider type: Climber

Amateur teams
- 2019: Gomur–Cantabria Infinita
- 2020–2021: Lizarte

Professional teams
- 2020: Equipo Kern Pharma (stagiaire)
- 2022–: Equipo Kern Pharma

Iván Cobo Cayón (born 2 January 2000) is a Spanish cyclist, who currently rides for UCI ProTeam Equipo Kern Pharma.

== Major results ==
2017
2nd Road race, National Junior Road Championships
2018
1st Stage 3 Vuelta al Besaya
National Junior Road Championships

2nd Road race
2nd Time trial

2019
1st Stage 1 Vuelta a Segovia
2020
3rd Time trial, National Under-23 Road Championships
2021
1st Road race, National Under-23 Road Championships
1st Memorial Juan Manuel Santisteban
2024
9th Overall Tour of Oman
2025
3rd Tour du Doubs
4th Overall O Gran Camiño
2026 (1 pro win)
1st Region on Dodecanese GP
6th Overall Tour de Taiwan
10th Overall Tour of Slovenia
