= Rovišče, Zagorje ob Savi =

Rovišče
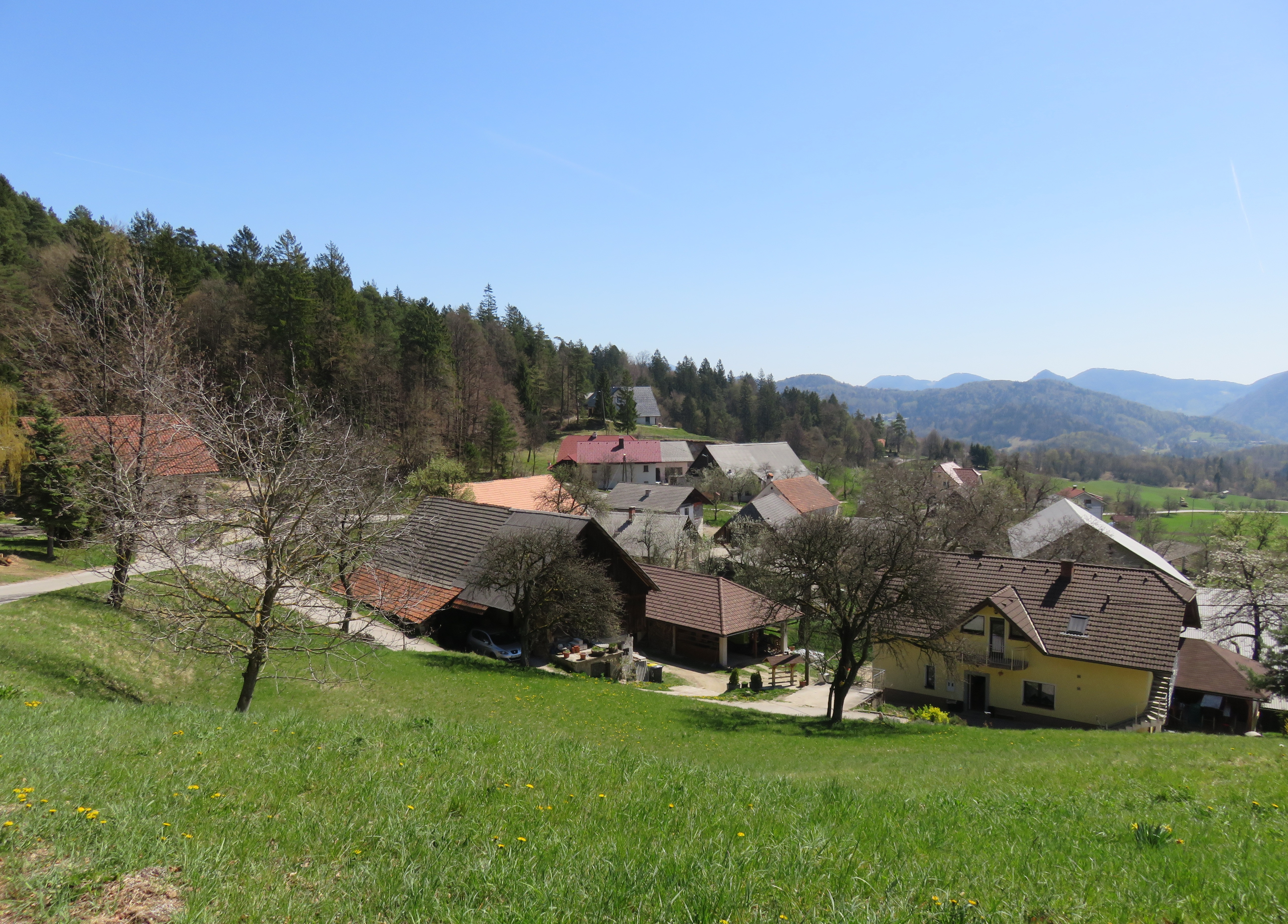

- Location in Slovenia
- Coordinates: 46°7′13.56″N 14°54′6.45″E
- Country: Slovenia
- Traditional region: Upper Carniola
- Statistical region: Central Sava
- Municipality: Zagorje ob Savi

Area
  - Total: 2.33 km^{2} (0.90 sq mi)
- Elevation: 667.5 m (2,190 ft)

Population (2002)
  - Total: 40
- Postal code: 1282

Rovišče (pronounced [ɾɔˈʋiːʃtʃɛ]; German: Rowische) is a settlement in the Municipality of Zagorje ob Savi in central Slovenia. The area is part of the traditional region of Upper Carniola. It is now included with the rest of the municipality in the Central Sava Statistical Region. It includes the hamlet of Zasavska Gora, also known as Sveta Gora (German: Heiligenberg).

The local parish church, built on Holy Mount (Slovene: Sveta gora), a peak north of the settlement, is dedicated to the Nativity of Mary (Slovene: Marijino Rojstvo) and belongs to the Roman Catholic Archdiocese of Ljubljana. It is a Gothic building with 18th-century modifications. Several of the paintings in the church are the work of Josip Egartner.
