= Antoni Maria Alcover i Sureda =

Mallorcan writer

Antoni Maria Alcover Sureda
- Mossèn Alcover
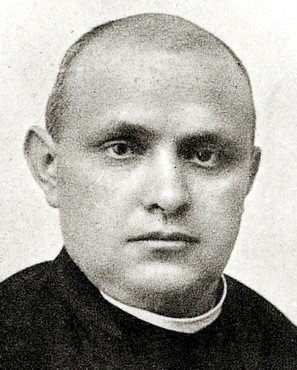
- Born: 2 February 1862; Santa Cirga, Manacor
- Died: 8 January 1932 (aged 69); Palma de Mallorca, Spain
- Occupation: parish priest
- Writing career
- Language: Catalan; Spanish
- Notable work: Català-Valencià-Balear Dictionary

Father Antoni Maria Alcover Sureda (Catalan: Mossèn Alcover, pronounced [muˈsɛn əlkuˈve]; 2 February 1862 – 8 January 1932) was a Mallorcan modernist writer, who wrote on a wide range of subjects including the Catholic Church, folklore and linguistics. He is chiefly associated with efforts to revive interest in the Catalan language and its dialects. Among his works was a Catalan-Valencian-Balearic dictionary.

== Biography ==
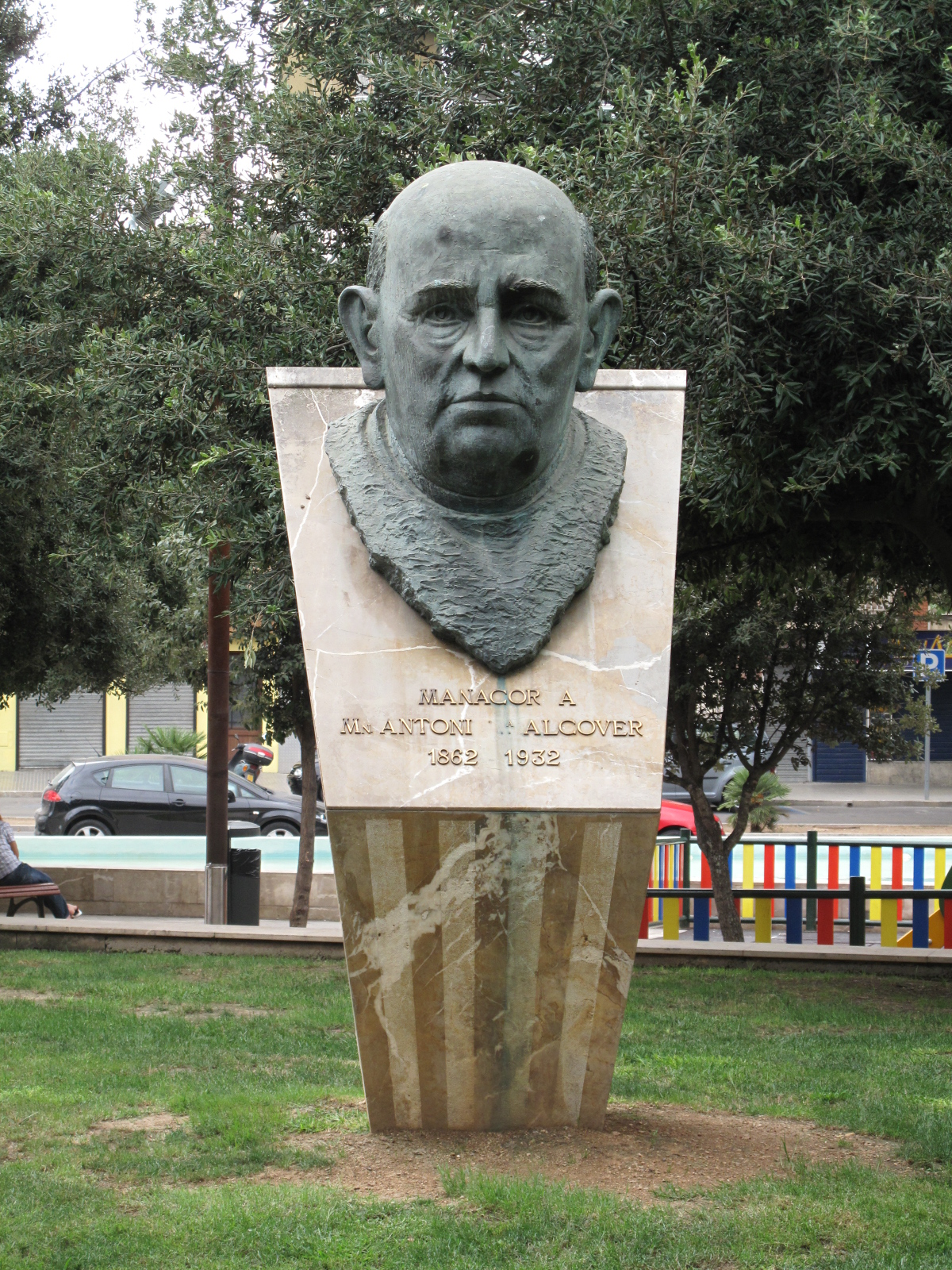
A monument in Manacor, Mallorca

Alcover was born in Santa Cirga, a small territory between Manacor and Porto Cristo, the son of laborers. After studying Latin and classics he moved at the age of 15 to Palma de Mallorca, where he continued his studies in seminary. He became quickly known as a stubborn polemicist.

Although his first literary efforts were in Spanish, he turned to the Catalan language after 1879. From this date, he undertook to collect the fables and folklore of Mallorca, which he began to publish in 1880 in various journals under the pseudonym Jordi d'es Racó. This collection is composed by around 430 folk-fables, which have been translated to several languages including English.

In 1886, he was ordained and became the parish priest for Manacor. In 1888 he became a professor of ecclesiastical history at the seminary in Palma. In 1898, the new bishop of Mallorca, Pere Joan Campins i Barceló, appointed him as vicar general of the Diocese of Mallorca. He remained in this position until 1916.

In 1905, he also obtained the position of magistral canon of the Cathedral of Mallorca.

In 1906, by his initiative and under his presidency, the first Congrés Internacional de la Llengua Catalana (International Congress of the Catalan Language) was held. He was named president of the philological branch of the Institute for Catalan Studies, a position which quickly ended after a furious dispute with other members of the institute.

His magnum opus was the Català-Valencià-Balear Dictionary, which he did not live to see completed. It was finished by his collaborator Francesc de Borja i Moll and the Catalan folklorist and lexicographer Irene Rocas i Romaguera.

Among other responsibilities, he was the correspondent of the Acadèmia de Bones Lletres de Barcelona in Barcelona and directed the publishing of the works of Ramon Llull.

== Work ==
His literary work focused on linguistic research, history, popular customs and folklore collections, various biographies, travel narratives and a novel.

- Antoni M. Alcover i Francesc de B. Moll, La flexió verbal en els dialectes catalans, 4 vols., Barcelona, Biblioteca Balmes, 1929–1933.
- Antoni M. Alcover, Aplec de rondaies mallorquines d'en Jordi d'es Racó, 24 vols., Palma, Moll, 1968–1975.
- Antoni M. Alcover, Per la llengua, ed. a cura de Josep Massot i Muntaner, Mallorca-Barcelona, Secció de Filologia Catalana de la Universitat de Palma-Publicacions de l'Abadia de Montserrat, 1983.
- Antoni M. Alcover, Dietari de l'excursió filològica (1906), edició a cura de Francesc de B. Moll, Barcelona, Departament de Cultura de la Generalitat de Catalunya, 1983.
- Diccionari català-valencià-balear: inventari lexicogràfic i etimològic de la llengua catalana en totes les seves formes literàries i dialectals, work started by Antoni Maria Alcover, written by Francesc de B. Moll, with the collaboration of Manuel Sanchis Guarner and Anna Moll Marquès, 10 vols., Palma, Moll, 1993.
