= Maria Gràcia Bassa i Rocas =

Spanish writer, folklorist and professor (1883–1961)

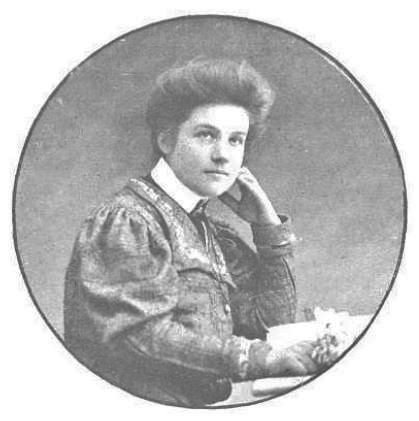
- Born: 1883; Llofriu
- Died: 1961 (aged 77–78)
- Parent(s): Irene Rocas i Romaguera

Maria Gràcia Bassa i Rocas (1883 in Llofriu – 1961 in Buenos Aires) was a Spanish folklorist, poet, and journalist.

== Life ==
The daughter of Joan Bassa i Bosch and Irene Rocas i Romaguera, she researched language and folklore, with her mother. She was a teacher in Llofriu.

In 1907, she married Joan Llorens i Carreras, in Pineda de Mar. They moved to Argentina, and Maria continued to take an interest in and promotion of Catalan culture and Catalan language. Her son Joan Llorens i Bassa (1908-1976) was also active in the Catalan literary community in Argentina.

She contributed to La Chronique de Palafrugell and to Feminal, the feminist magazine published in Barcelona. She participated in the Floral Games before her death in 1961 in Buenos Aires.

== Legacy ==
On 27 February 2008, the Town Hall of Palafrugell dedicated a street in the Llofriu district to her.

== Works ==
- Esplais de llunyania (1919)
- Branca florida (1933)
- Els camins de la pampa argentina (1941) (unpublished)
