= Rupa, Kranj =

Rupa
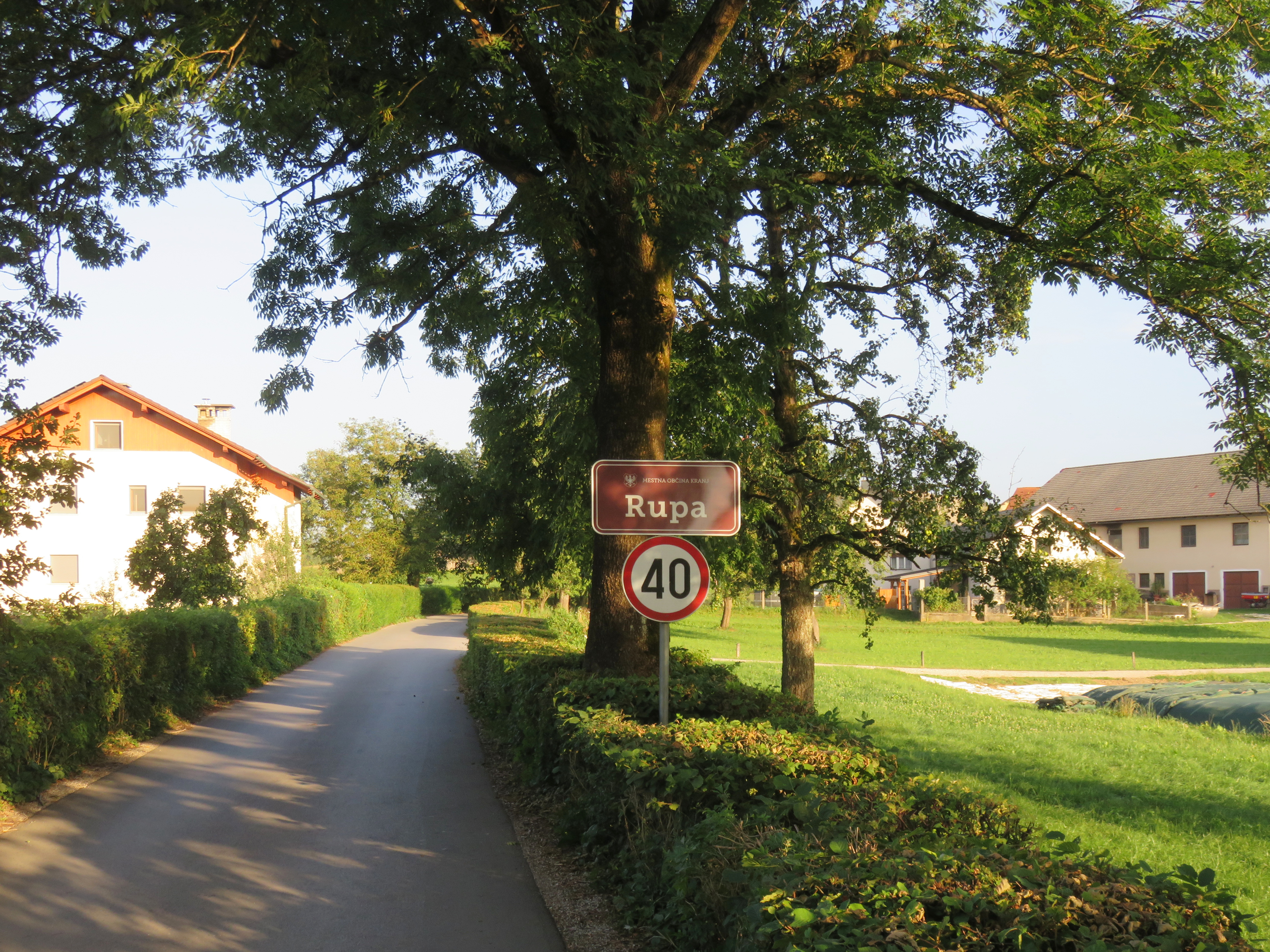

- Location in Slovenia
- Coordinates: 46°15′25″N 14°21′53″E
- Country: Slovenia
- Traditional region: Upper Carniola
- Statistical region: Upper Carniola
- Municipality: Kranj
- Elevation: 404 m (1,325 ft)

Rupa (pronounced [ˈɾuːpa]) is a former settlement in the Municipality of Kranj in the Upper Carniola region of Slovenia. It is now part of the city of Kranj.

== Geography ==
Rupa stands north of Kranj's city center, along the road to Kokrica, above the confluence of the Rupovščica (or Kokrica) River with the Kokra. Its rolling hills are a southern extension of the glacial terrace known as the Udin Woods.

== Name ==
Rupa was attested in historical sources as Rvb in 1326, Rûb in 1327, Rub in 1369, and Růb in 1385, among other variations. Rupa and names like it (e.g., the plural form Rupe) are found in various places in Slovenia. The name is derived from the Slovene common noun rupa 'cave, sinkhole, depression', referring to a local geographical feature.

== History ==
Rupa had a population of 154 in 38 houses in 1880, 164 in 30 houses in 1900, and 250 in 42 houses in 1931. Rupa was annexed by the city of Kranj in 1957, ending its existence as a separate settlement.

== Church ==
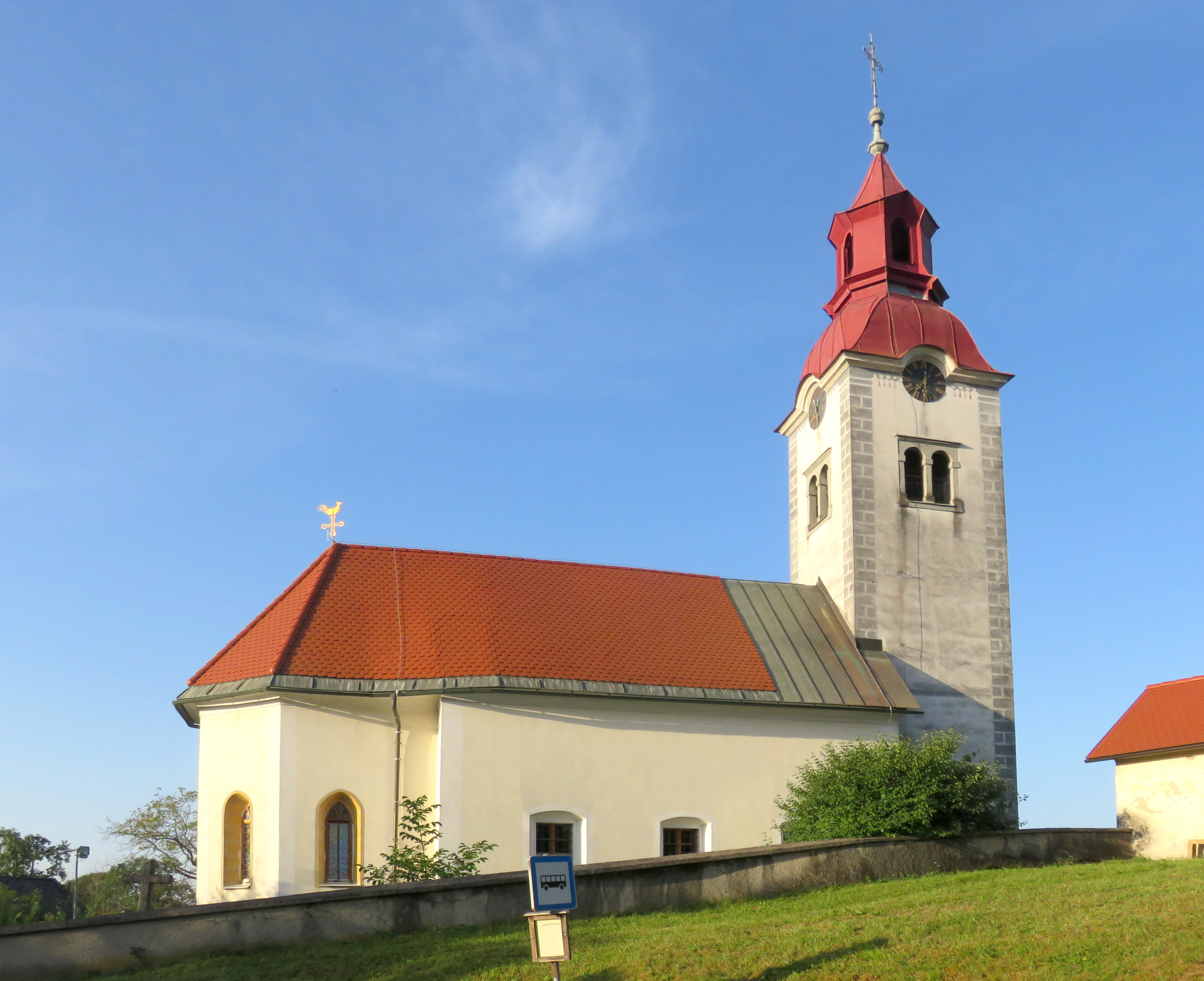
Saint Mary Magdalene Church

The church in Rupa is dedicated to Mary Magdalene and belongs to the Parish of Kranj–Zlato Polje. The church was mentioned in written records in 1483, and it was renovated in 1836–1838. The church cemetery was also used for burials of residents of Kokrica, Mlaka pri Kranju, Srakovlje, Ilovka, and Tatinec until 1787. After that, the large Parish of Predvor was split, and residents of these villages were buried at Suha pri Predosljah until the cemetery was established next to the church in Predoslje.

== Notable people ==
Notable people that were born or lived in Rupa include the following:

- Franc Josip Remec (1850–1883), translator
- Marjan Šorli (1915–1975), architect
