= Alex Tolio =

Italian cyclist

- Tolio in 2026

Personal information
- Born: 30 March 2000 (age 26) Bassano del Grappa, Italy

Cycling career
- Sport: Cycling
- Current team: Bardiani–CSF 7 Saber
- Discipline: Road
- Role: Rider
- Rider type: Climber

Amateur teams
- 2013: San Pietro in Gù
- 2014–2016: Guadense Rotogal
- 2017–2018: Pressix P3 Mito Sport
- 2019: Zalf–Euromobil–Désirée–Fior

Professional teams
- 2020: Casillo–Petroli Firenze–Hopplà
- 2021: Zalf Euromobil Fior
- 2022–: Bardiani–CSF–Faizanè

Alex Tolio (born 30 March 2000) is an Italian racing cyclist, who currently rides for UCI ProTeam Bardiani–CSF 7 Saber.

== Major results ==
2018
10th Overall Giro della Lunigiana
2019
1st Gran Premio Polverini Arredamenti
2020
1st Gran Premio Città di Empoli
10th Trofeo Città di San Vendemiano
2021
1st Strade Bianche di Romagna
1st Piccola Sanremo
3rd GP Capodarco
9th Trofeo Città di San Vendemiano
2022
3rd Ruota d'Oro
4th Gran Premio Sportivi di Poggiana
7th GP Capodarco
2023
4th GP Goriska & Vipava Valley
5th Flèche Ardennaise
8th Overall Tour du Rwanda
2025
10th Overall Tour of Slovenia
2026
8th Overall Tour of Slovenia
10th Overall Czech Tour
