= Llofriu =

Coordinates: 41°55′50.13″N 3°7′52.39″E

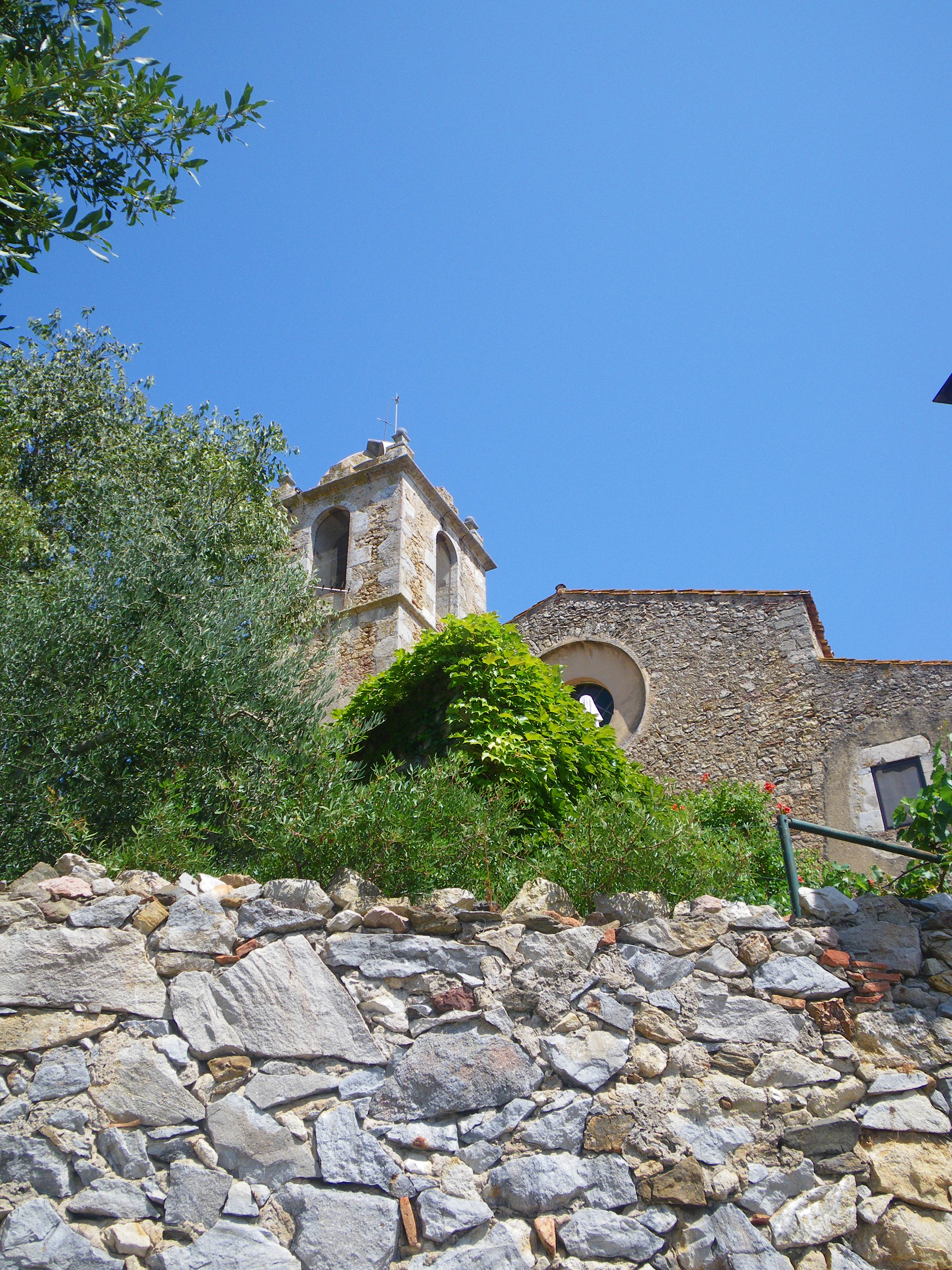
View of the church of St. Fruitós.

Llofriu (a name of Germanic origin) is a village of the town of Palafrugell (Baix Empordà), in Catalonia, Spain. As of 2026, it has about 270 inhabitants.

The parish church of St. Fruitós, as mentioned in a testament from 1121, was dependent on the priory of Santa Anna of Barcelona until the seizure (first third of the nineteenth century).

The economy is based primarily on agriculture and livestock, although the majority of its people work today in Palafrugell, the service sector.

There is an important cork oak forest just outside of the village.

== Main sights ==
Media related to Llofriu at Wikimedia Commons

- The Church of Saint Fructuosus (St. Fruítos) of Llofriu. The current edifice, dating from the 17th century, was rebuilt in an old Romanesque-style, of which only a group of pieces of iron in the door remain. It comprises a nave with side chapels and a polygonal apse, with a rectangular gate. Its bell tower is square. The church was sacked in 1638 by Spanish soldiers in retaliation for a revolt in Palafrugell.
- The Old Village (Nucli Antic) is collection of traditional architecture dating to the 17th-19th century. The oldest house dates from 1764 according to the inscription on one of its doors.
- Cementiri de Llofriu (1895), in the Neoclassical style. The writer Josep Pla i Casadevall is buried here.
- mas Pla, a 17th-century farmhouse, is located on the side of the C-31, very near to Palafrugell.
- Manor of Bassa Rocas (Can Bassa) (16th century). It houses drawings and texts by members of this family, who have made significant cultural contributions to Catalonia. After the house became vacant, it was converted into a primary school. Later the house became a cultural center, reopening in 2008.

== Notable people ==
- Maria Gràcia Bassa i Rocas, Catalán-language writer, folklorist, and feminist.
