= Kokrica =

Settlement in Upper Carniola, Slovenia

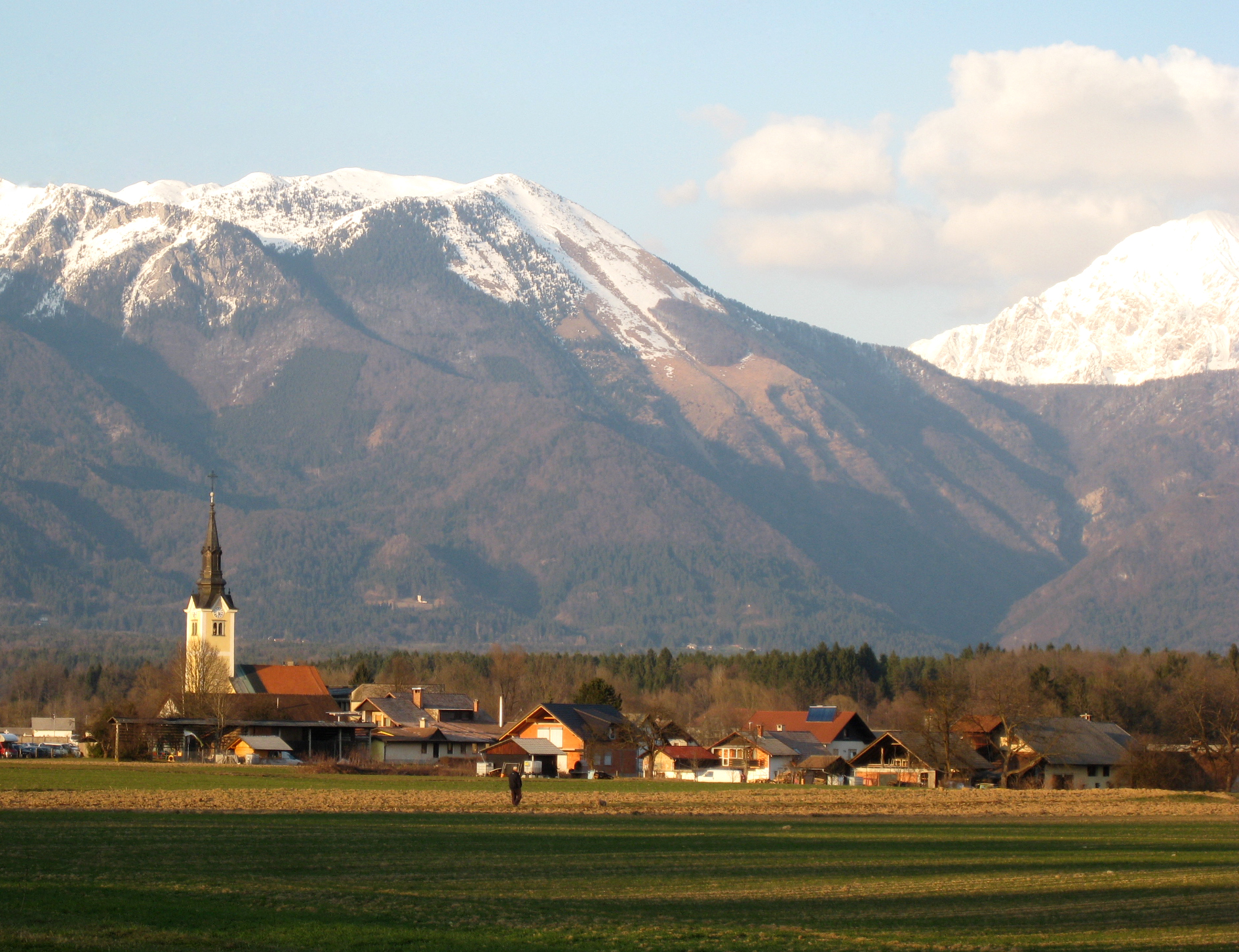

- Location in Slovenia
- Coordinates: 46°15′49.68″N 14°21′21.76″E
- Country: Slovenia
- Traditional region: Upper Carniola
- Statistical region: Upper Carniola
- Municipality: Kranj

Area
  - Total: 1.24 km^{2} (0.48 sq mi)
- Elevation: 409.2 m (1,343 ft)

Population (2002)
  - Total: 1,595

Kokrica (pronounced [ˈkoːkɾitsa]; German: Kokritz) is a settlement just north of Kranj in the Upper Carniola region of Slovenia.

The parish church, built slightly north of the main settlement centre, is dedicated to Saint Laurence.
