= Trška Gora, Novo Mesto =

Trška Gora
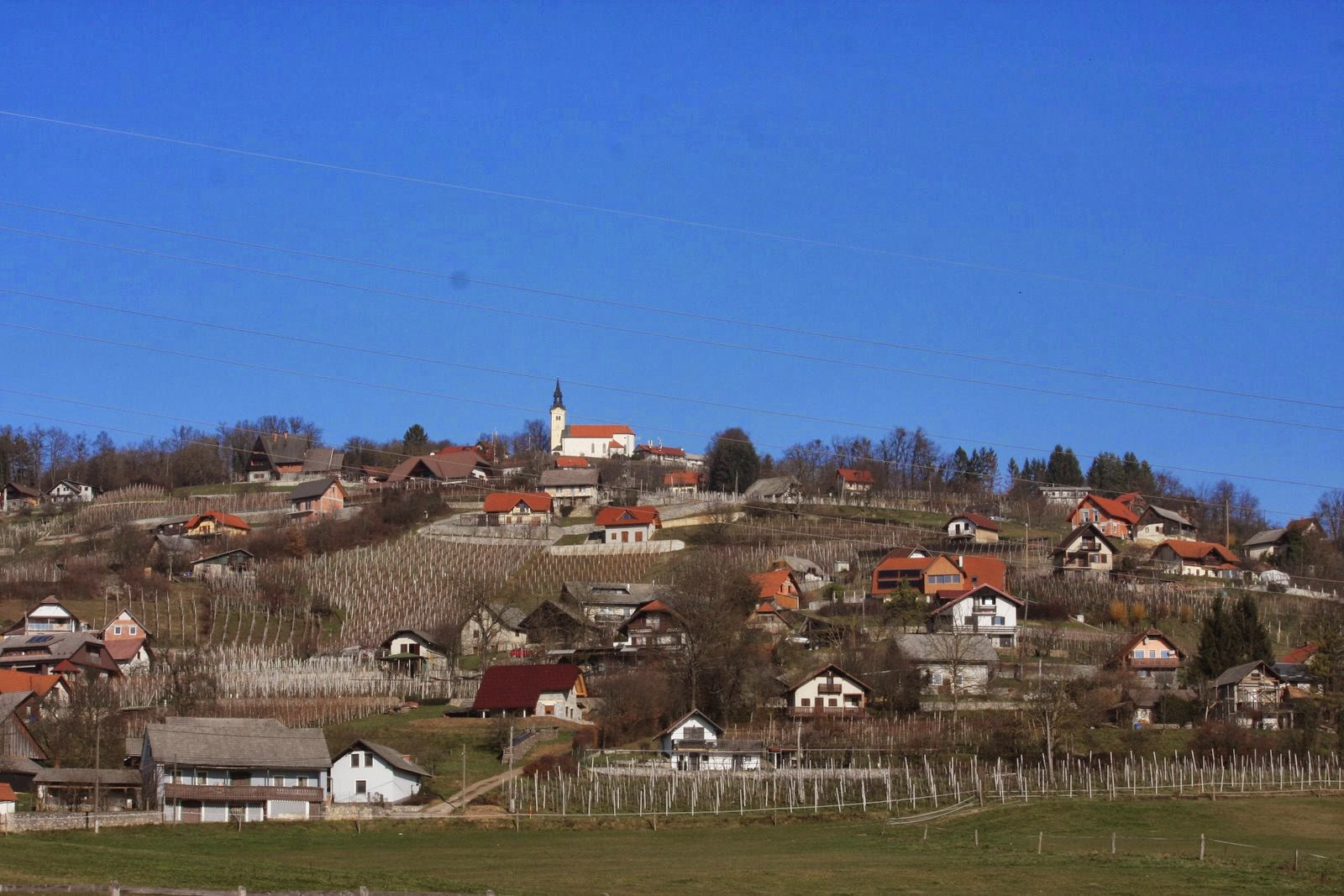

- Location in Slovenia
- Coordinates: 45°50′35.58″N 15°10′50.22″E
- Country: Slovenia
- Traditional region: Lower Carniola
- Statistical region: Southeast Slovenia
- Municipality: Novo Mesto

Area
  - Total: 1.324 km^{2} (0.511 sq mi)
- Elevation: 365.1 m (1,198 ft)

Population (2026)
  - Total: 285
  - Density: 215/km^{2} (560/sq mi)
- Time zone: CEST
  - Summer (DST): CET
- Postal code: 8000
- Area code: 07

Trška Gora (pronounced [ˈtəɾʃka ˈɡɔːɾa]) is a settlement on Mount Trška Gora north of Novo Mesto in southeastern Slovenia. The area is part of the traditional region of Lower Carniola and is now included in the Southeast Slovenia Statistical Region. In January 2026, the population was 285.

The local church, built on top of Mount Trška Gora in the northern part of the settlement, is dedicated to the Nativity of Mary and belongs to the Parish of Šentpeter–Otočec. It was built in 1621 on the site of an earlier church. Two of the paintings in the church are the work of Josip Egartner.

Shortly after the church was built, four linden trees were planted beside it. The largest one's trunk measures 830 centimeters (330 in) in circumference, making it the linden tree with the largest girth in Lower Carniola. The linden trees are nearly 400 years old.
