= Dialogue (disambiguation) =

Dialogue(s) or dialog(s) commonly refers to:

- Dialogue, a conversational exchange
  - Dialogue in writing, a verbal exchange between two or more characters

Dialogue(s) or dialog(s) may also refer to:

== Organizations ==
- Dialog (architectural firm), a Canadian architectural, engineering, interior design and planning firm
- Dialog (organization), a private society founded by Peter Thiel and Auren Hoffman

== Art and culture ==
=== Philosophical concepts ===
- Socratic dialogue, a genre of philosophical literary prose developed mainly by Plato
- Dialogue (Bakhtin), the concept of dialogue in the philosophy of Mikhail Bakhtin
- Philosophy of dialogue, a type of philosophy based on the work of Martin Buber

=== Books ===
- Dialogue Concerning the Two Chief World Systems, a 1632 book by Galileo Galilei
- Dialogues (Pope Gregory), a collection of four books written by Pope Gregory I
- Dialogs (Lem), a 1957 book-length essay by Polish science-fiction writer Stanisław Lem
- A Dialogue, a 1973 book by James Baldwin and Nikki Giovanni
- Dialogues (Gilles Deleuze), 1977 book of discussions between Deleuze and Claire Parnet

=== Periodicals ===
- Dialog (magazine), a Polish magazine that publishes contemporary Polish and foreign plays
- Dialog (newspaper), a weekly newspaper from Varna city, Bulgaria, Europe
- Dialogue: A Journal of Mormon Thought
- Dialogue: Canadian Philosophical Review
- Dialogue, philosophy journal of Phi Sigma Tau
- Dialogue (magazine), a 1978–2004 art magazine

=== Classical music ===
- Dialogues, 1923 piano solo by Federico Mompou
- Dialogues 1, Op. 25, and Dialogues 2, Op. 62, by Carlos Veerhoff
- Dialogues II, Op. 126, by Frank Campo
- Dialogues II, for piano and chamber orchestra by Elliott Carter

=== Groups and labels ===
- Dialogue+, a Japanese idol group

=== Music albums ===
- Dialogue (Bobby Hutcherson album), 1965
- Dialogue, by Valery Leontiev, 1984
- Dialogues (Carlos Paredes & Charlie Haden album), 1990
- Dialogue (Four Tet album), 1999
- Dialogues (Houston Person and Ron Carter album), 2002
- Dialogues (Kenny Davern album), 2005
- A Dialogue, by Gwen Stacy, 2009
- Dialogue (Thavius Beck album), 2009
- Dialogues (Ivar Antonsen & Vigleik Storaas album), 2010
- Dialogue (Steve Weingart & Renee Jones album), 2011
- Dialogue (EP) by Ayase, 2026

=== Restaurants ===
- Dialogue (restaurant), a defunct Michelin-starred restaurant in Santa Monica, California

=== Songs ===
- "Dialogue (Part I & II)", a 1972 song by Chicago

=== Television ===
- Dialogue, a television show on China Global Television Network formerly hosted by Yang Rui
- Dialogue, a television and radio program of the Woodrow Wilson International Center For Scholars

=== Works of art ===
- Dialogue (1989), an installation art work by Xiao Lu

=== Religion ===
- Interfaith dialogue
- Dialogue Mass, a religious rite

== Technology ==
- Dialog (online database), an information service
- Dialog (software), a shell script application that displays text user interface widgets
- Dialog Axiata, a Sri Lankan telecommunication company
  - Dialog TV, a direct broadcast satellite pay TV service
- Dialog box, a type of user interface
- Dialog Semiconductor, a Germany technology company
- Dialogue system, a computer system intended to converse with a human
- <dialog></dialog>, an HTML element
- Dyalog APL, a programming language implementation
- Ericsson Dialog, a telephone model
- Gorenje Dialog, a microcomputer system
