= Gorenje (disambiguation) =

Gorenje is a major appliance manufacturer from Slovenia. It can also refer to:

== Places in Slovenia ==
- Gorenje, Kočevje
- Gorenje, Kranj
- Gorenje, Lukovica
- Gorenje, Postojna
- Gorenje, Spodnje Koseze
- Gorenje, Velenje
- Dozens of places starting with Gorenje ("Upper"), see

== Other ==
- Gorenje Dialog, a microcomputer system
