= Bobovnik =

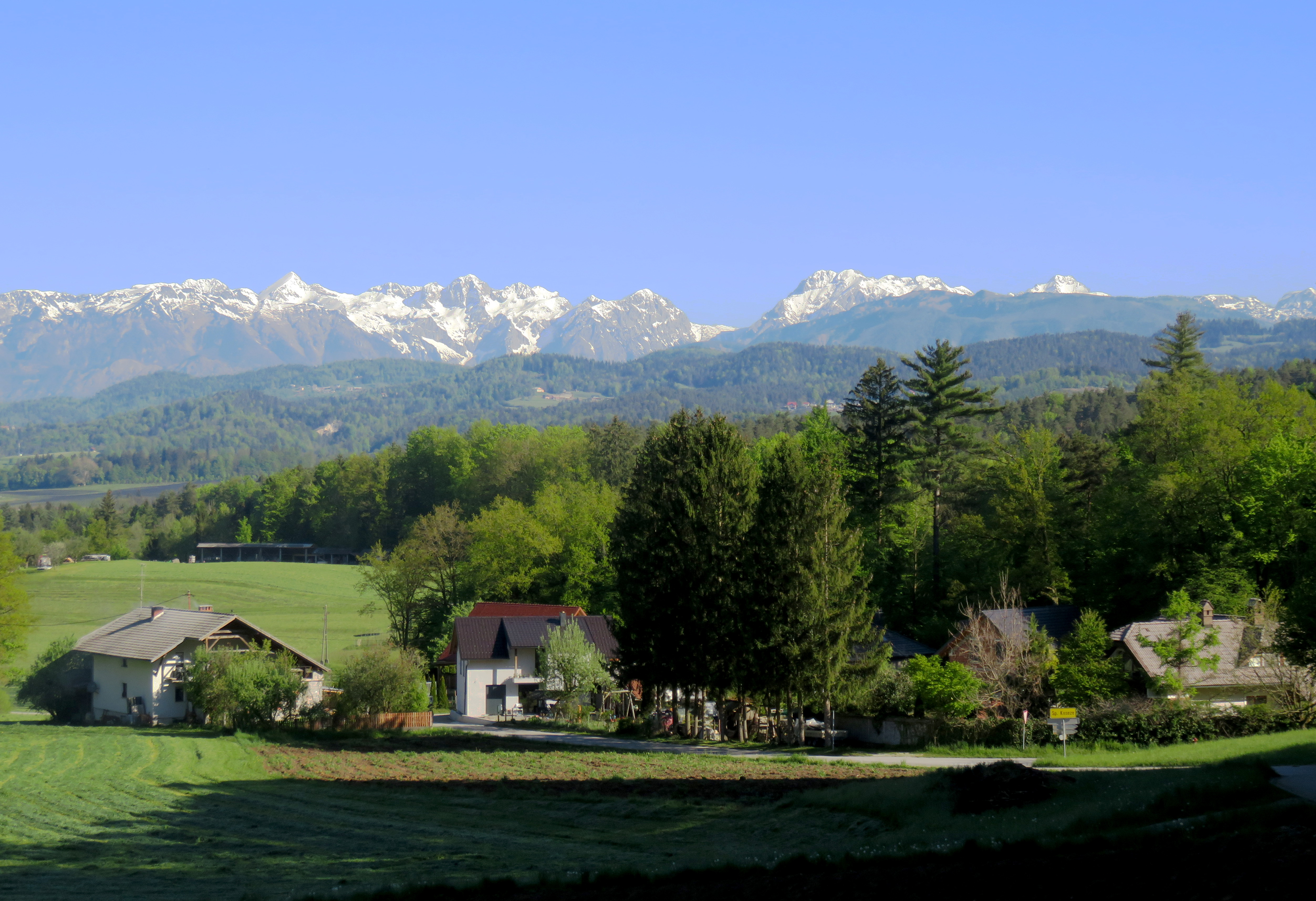

- Location in Slovenia
- Coordinates: 46°08′56″N 14°41′51″E
- Country: Slovenia
- Traditional region: Upper Carniola
- Statistical region: Central Slovenia
- Municipality: Lukovica
- Elevation: 356 m (1,168 ft)

Bobovnik (pronounced [bɔˈboːu̯nik]) is a former village in central Slovenia in the Municipality of Lukovica. It is now part of the village of Spodnje Koseze. It is part of the traditional region of Upper Carniola and is now included in the Central Slovenia Statistical Region.

== Geography ==
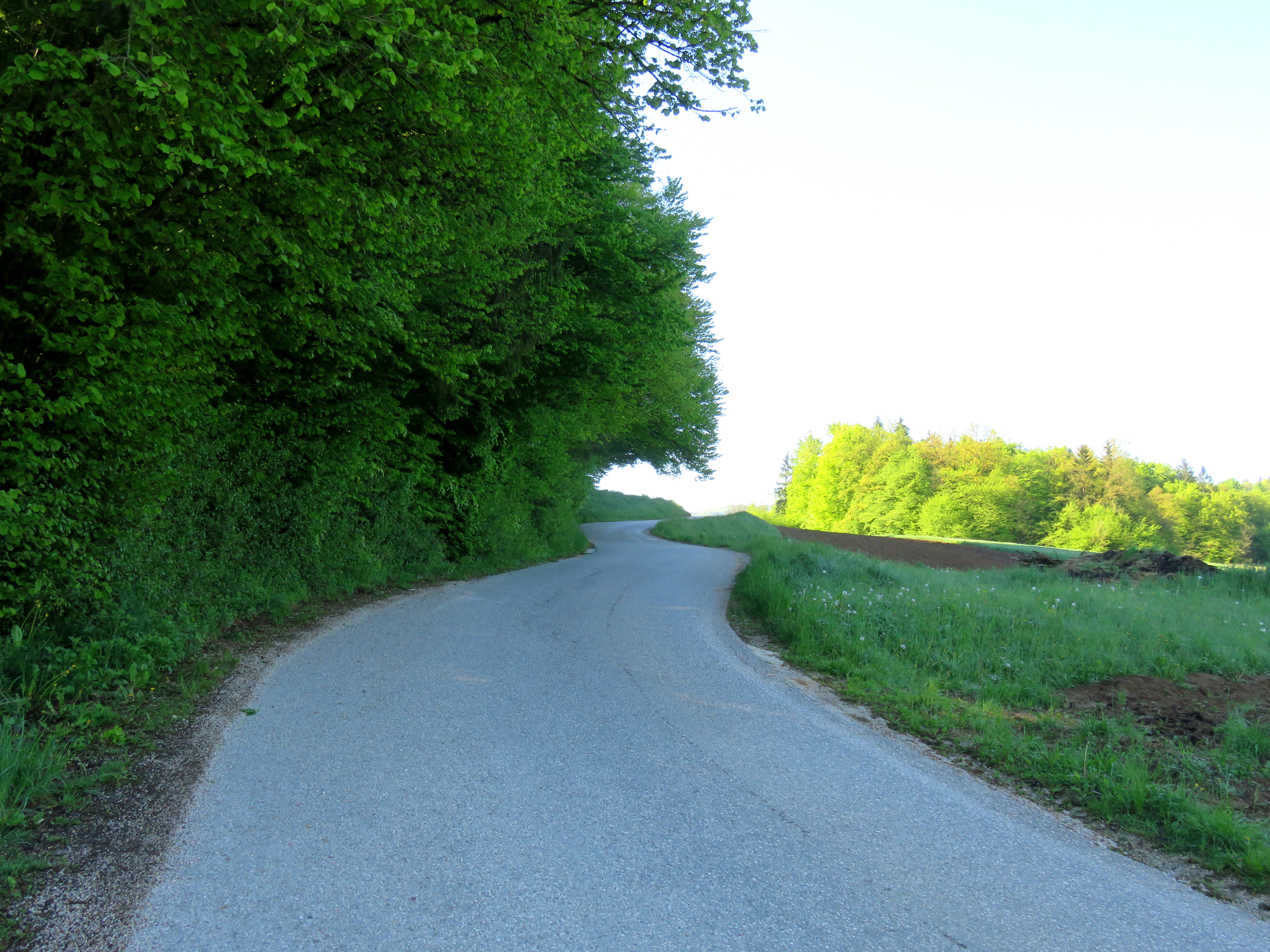
The Bobovnik Slope

Bobovnik stands in the northeasternmost part of Spodnje Koseze. It is located on the north side of the Bobovnik Slope (Slovene: Bobovniški klanec), beyond which lies the Moravče Basin.

== Name ==
The name Bobovnik is believed to derive from the common noun bob 'fava bean', either directly or secondarily as an anthroponym. Related place names in Slovenia include Bobovše, Bobošek, Bobovek, Bobovec, and Bobovo.

== History ==
Bobovnik had a population of five (in two houses) in 1900. Bobovnik was annexed by Spodnje Koseze in 1955, ending its existence as a separate settlement.
