= Trnjava =

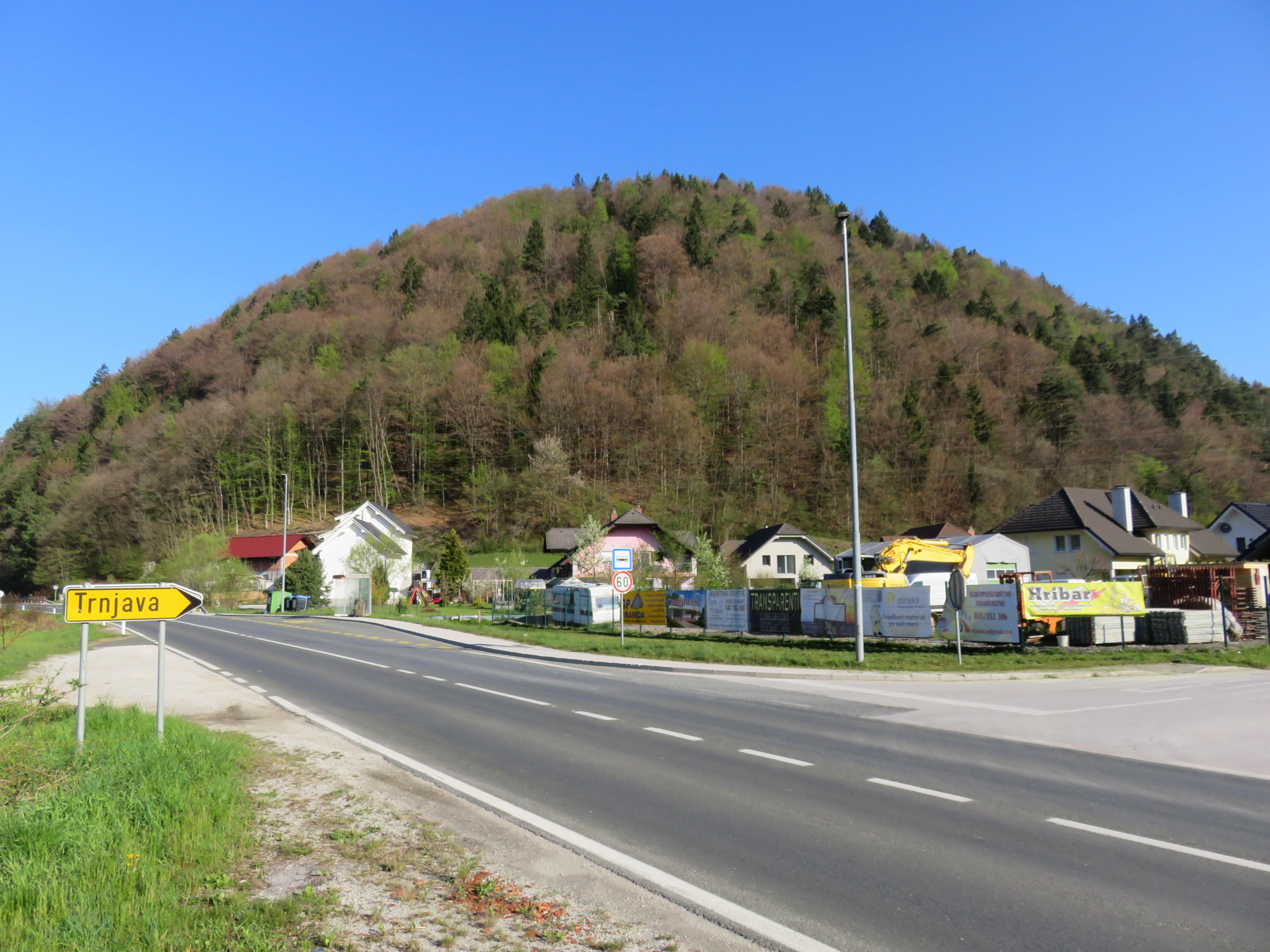

- Location in Slovenia
- Coordinates: 46°10′22.24″N 14°42′47.28″E
- Country: Slovenia
- Traditional region: Upper Carniola
- Statistical region: Central Slovenia
- Municipality: Lukovica

Area
  - Total: 1.5 km^{2} (0.58 sq mi)
- Elevation: 344.1 m (1,129 ft)

Population (2002)
  - Total: 172

Trnjava (pronounced [təɾˈnjaːʋa]) is a settlement east of Lukovica pri Domžalah in the eastern part of the Upper Carniola region of Slovenia.
