= Guardians of the Greenwood =

1995 video game

- Developer: 4Mation
- Designer: Mike Matson
- Platforms: Windows 3.1, RISC OS
- Release: January 1995
- Genre: Educational

Guardians of the Greenwood is a 1995 video game developed by 4Mation and published for Windows 3.1 and RISC OS compatible Acorn Archimedes personal computers. It is a fantasy-themed educational video game intended to teach children about environmental issues. Upon release, Guardians of the Greenwood received generally positive reviews, including praise for its visual design, and won a Silver award for Software at BETT in 1996.

== Gameplay ==
Gameplay screenshot

Players assist a young girl, Crinkle, who comes from a village named Rhymers Hatch, and help her explore her local forest and interact with its mythical inhabitants to save it from destruction by the industrial corporation Hawk Enterprises. Players navigate the forest using a map to travel across static scenes representing a photograph of a place, which is animated with cartoonlike images. The game features dialog with characters that includes digitised speech for over 30,000 words and a dictionary for 500 terms.

== Development ==
Guardians of the Greenwood was developed by designer Mike Matson. It was showcased at BETT in 1995, and received the Silver award for the Software category in the 1996 event. It was released on CD-ROM in January 1995.

== Reception ==
Reception

Review score
Publication	Score
Personal Computer World	4/5

Describing Guardians of the Greenwood as "ambitious", Acorn User commended the game's "clear" audio, and praised the visual fidelity of its digitised photography and 3D graphics as "clever" and "perfectly scaled". The publication awarded the game the 'Best CD-ROM' of 1995, praising it as "truly ground-breaking" for its educational content. Tes considered the game to contain "high artistic and technical merit" due to the "skilful blend of photographic backgrounds and animated cartoon-style images", the "personality and charm" of its characters, and "excellent" plot, although critiqued the "amount of time needed to accomplish" gameplay tasks. Personal Computer World enjoyed its inclusion of British folklore in its narrative, and considered it "doesn't preach" about its environmental messaging. However, it felt that the pace of the software was slow, and the gameplay was difficult and may require adult instruction.
