= Ericsson DBH 1001 telephone =

Line of Bakelite telephones

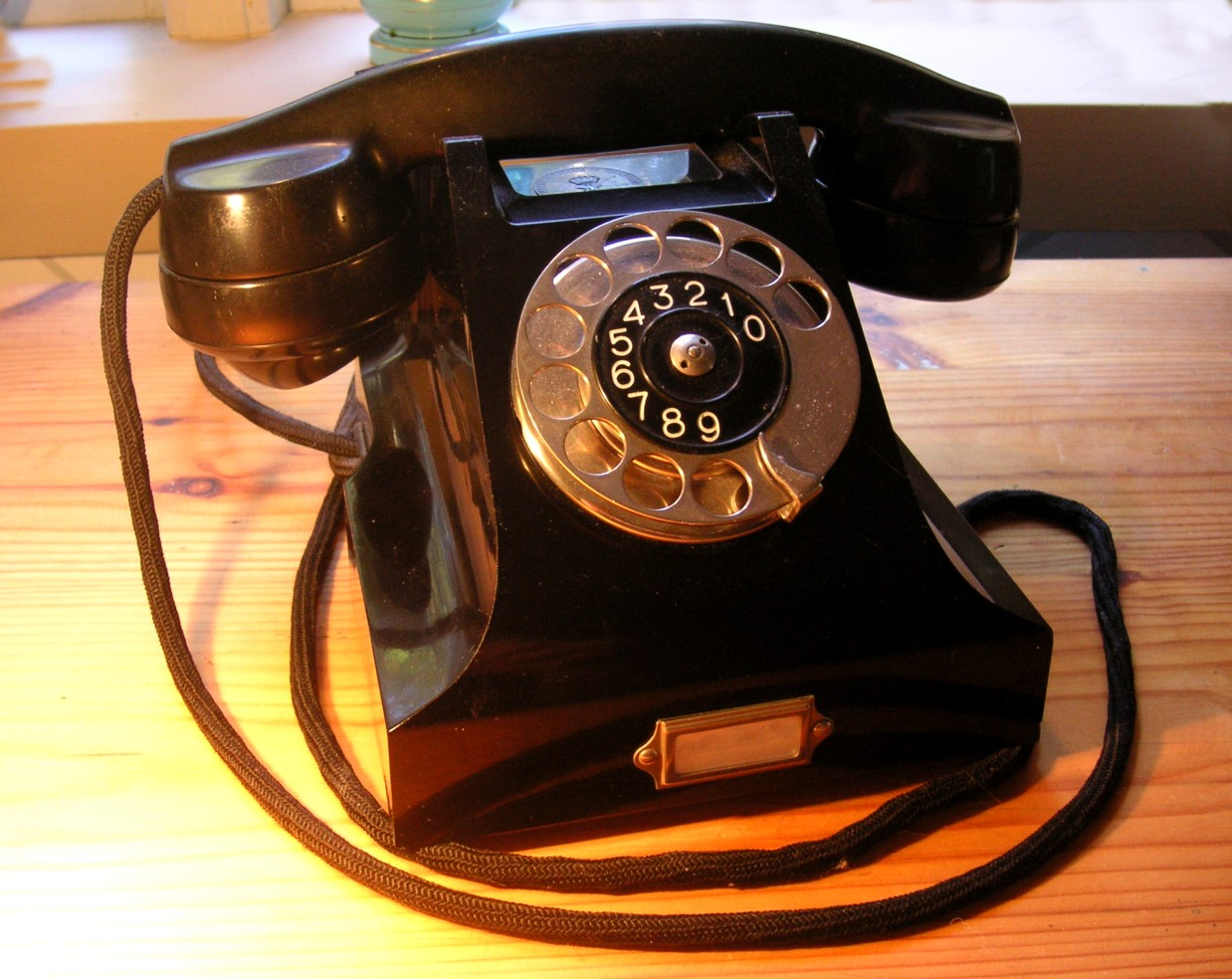
Ericsson Bakelite telephone 1931

The Bakelite phone (bakelittelefon) officially known as Ericsson DBH 1001, and later as M33, N1020, and ED 702, was a Swedish line of telephones made from the polymer Bakelite and produced for over thirty years between 1931 and 1962.

== History ==
The Ericsson DBH 1001 of 1931 was a collaborative project between the Elektrisk Bureau in Oslo, Televerket (Sweden) and Lars Magnus Ericsson (1846–1926). It was designed by Norwegian electrical engineer Johan Christian Bjerknes (1889-1983) and Norwegian artist and designer Jean Heiberg (1884–1976). It was the first Bakelite phone with integral cradle, dial and ringer, and was very modern for its time.

Until the early 1930s, the housing of the Swedish phone models was made from pressed steel. Material change from steel to Bakelite brought new opportunities in design, while also reducing the production time for the housing. The Bakelite phone was not only compact but also light at just below 3 kg (6.6 lb), and could be grasped by one hand. The device with its simple, curved angular design became an instant hit with the industry as well as the consumers, and was highly influential. In most of Europe, it was known as the Swedish type of telephone.

== Variants ==
Already in the mid 1930s, Ericsson showed a white Bakelite phone in advertisements, often in the hands of a young woman. However, this model seems never to have been offered to the public. At the 1939 World Fair in New York City, Ericsson showed a transparent variant made of acrylic and diakon plastic.

The standard color of the phone was black, but there were also variants in drab brown, red, and green. The process of using Bakelite did not permit the production of bright colors. The device was manufactured from 1933 in a smaller format, and from 1947 redesigned with softer, more rounded edges as the model designated M50. It was also offered in white melamine resin. The metal dial rotor was replaced with a plastic version, and a spiral cord became standard.

During 1950, Ericsson also experimented with a keypad version, instead of the rotary dial, but it would take another ten years before they became standard in Swedish phones. In 1962, the Bakelite phone was replaced by the Ericsson Dialog model.

== Images ==
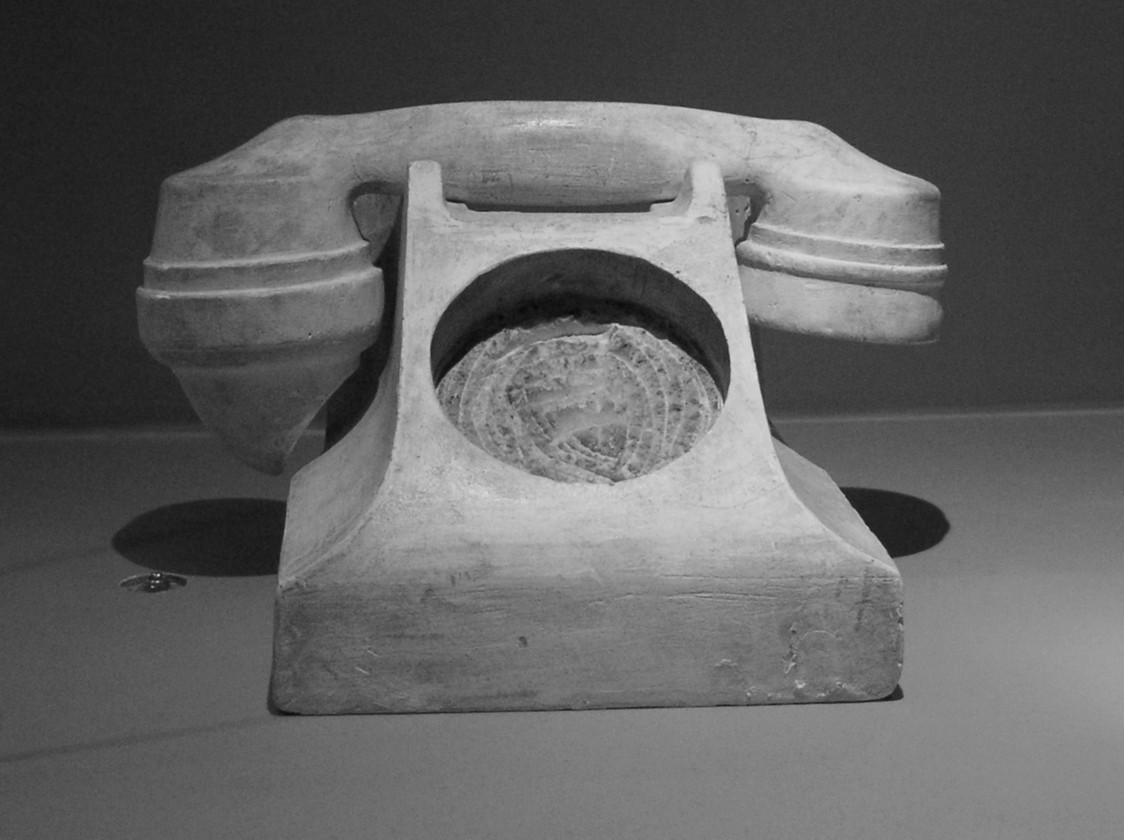
Clay model 1930

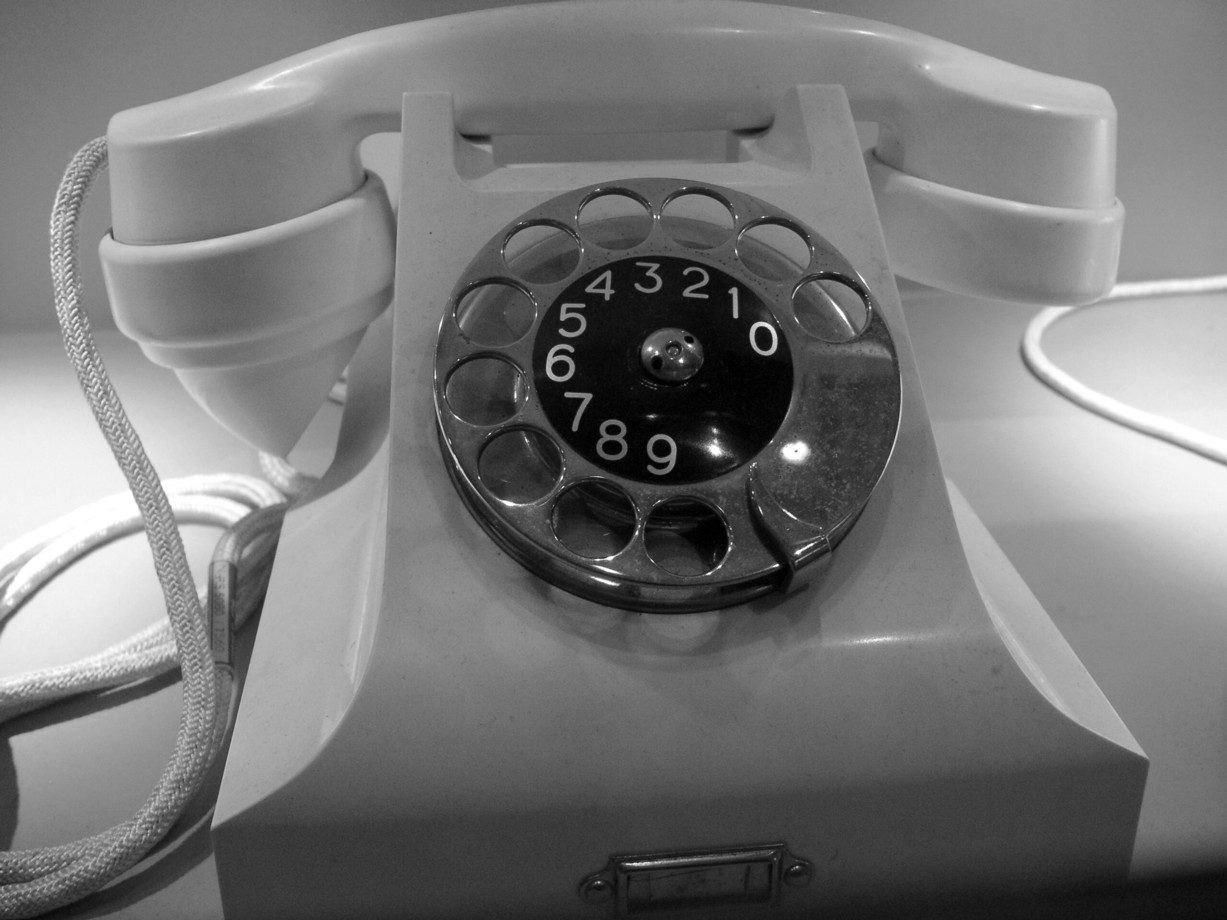
White melamine 1935

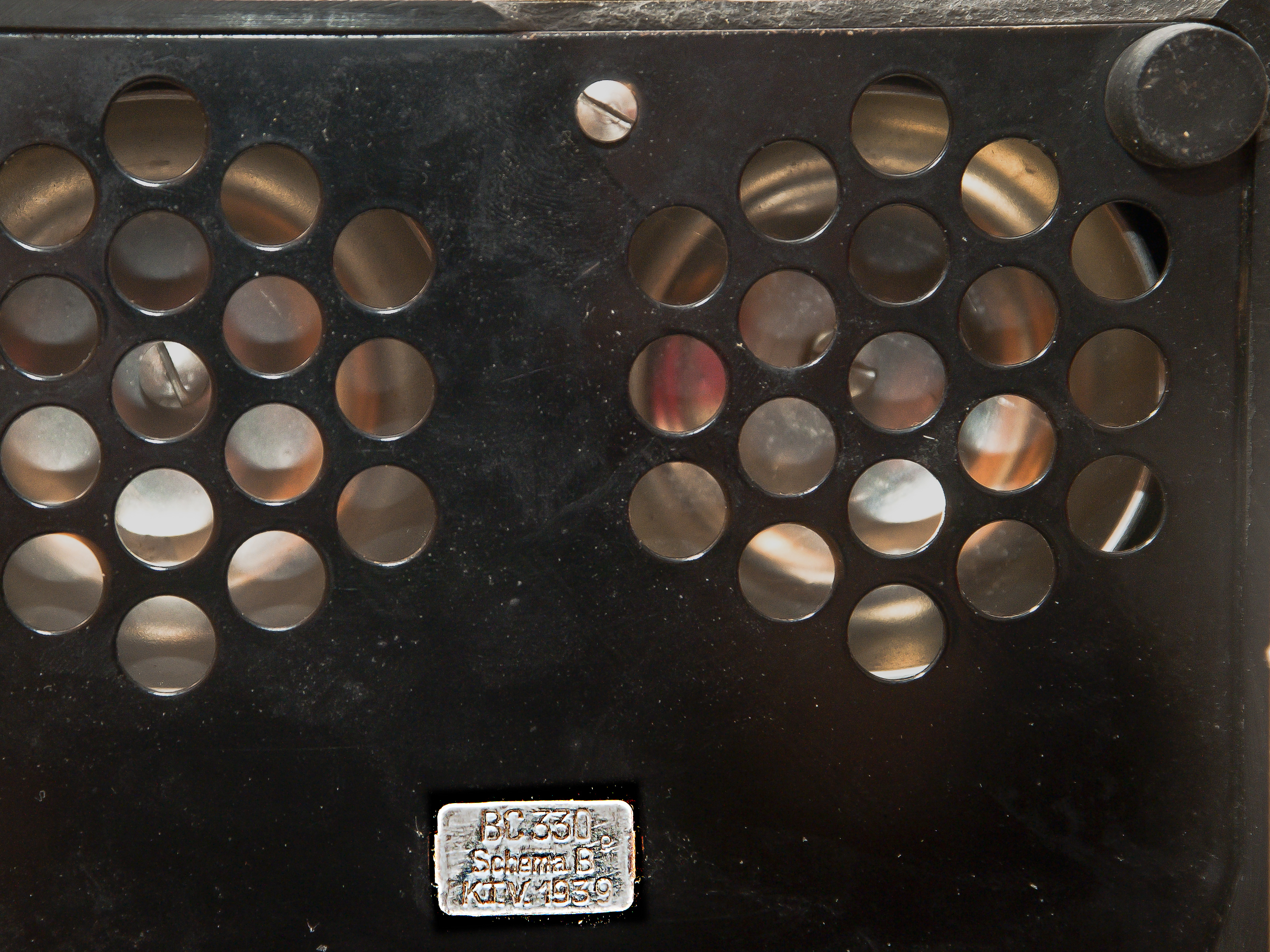
Model DBH 1001 (bottom plate) 1939

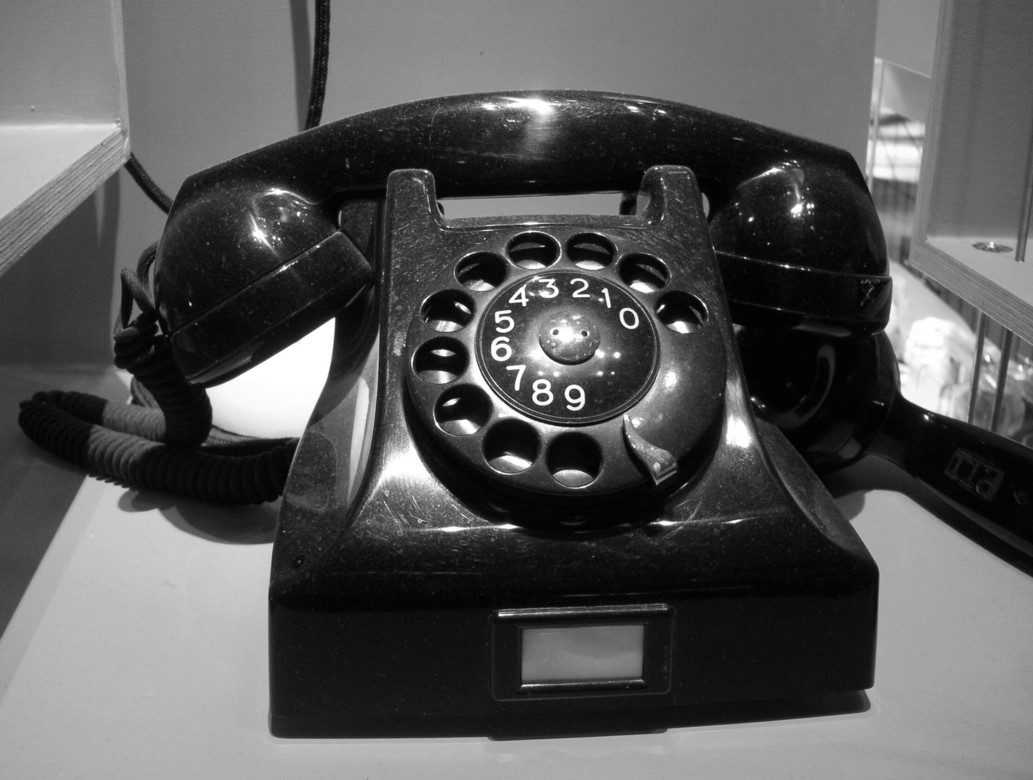
Revised with softer lines 1947–1962

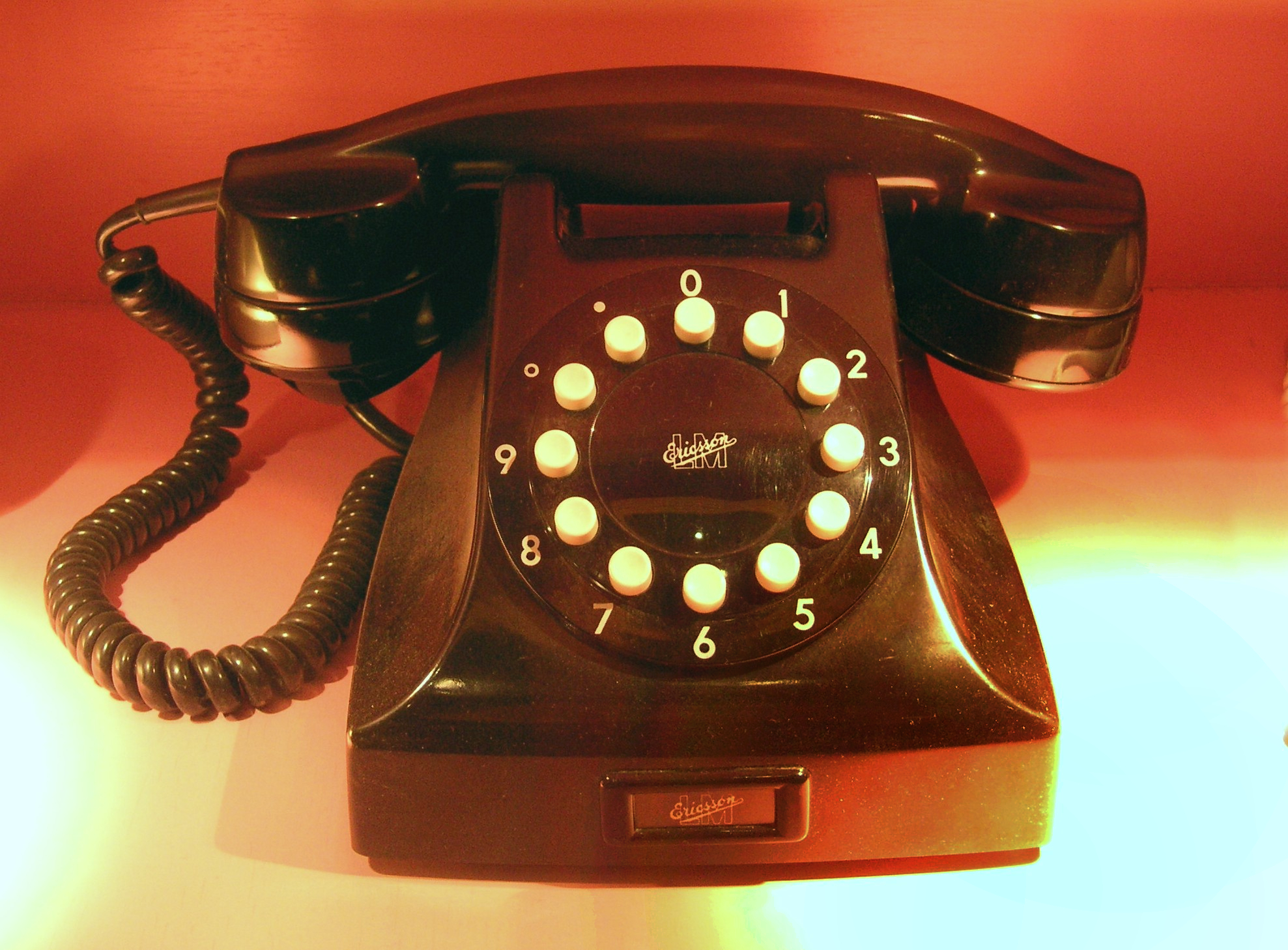
Experiment with keypad

== See also ==
- Ericofon
- Ericsson Dialog

== Other sources ==
- Kjetil Fallan (2010). Design History: Understanding Theory and Method. Berg Publishers. ISBN 9781847887030.
