= Huje =

Huje is a place name that may refer to:

Germany

- Huje (Germany), a municipality in the district of Steinburg, Schleswig-Holstein

Slovenia

- Huje, Ilirska Bistrica, a settlement in the Municipality of Ilirska Bistrica, southwestern Slovenia
- Huje, Kranj, a former village, now part of the city of Kranj, northwestern Slovenia
