= Janez Vesel =

Slovene lawyer and poet

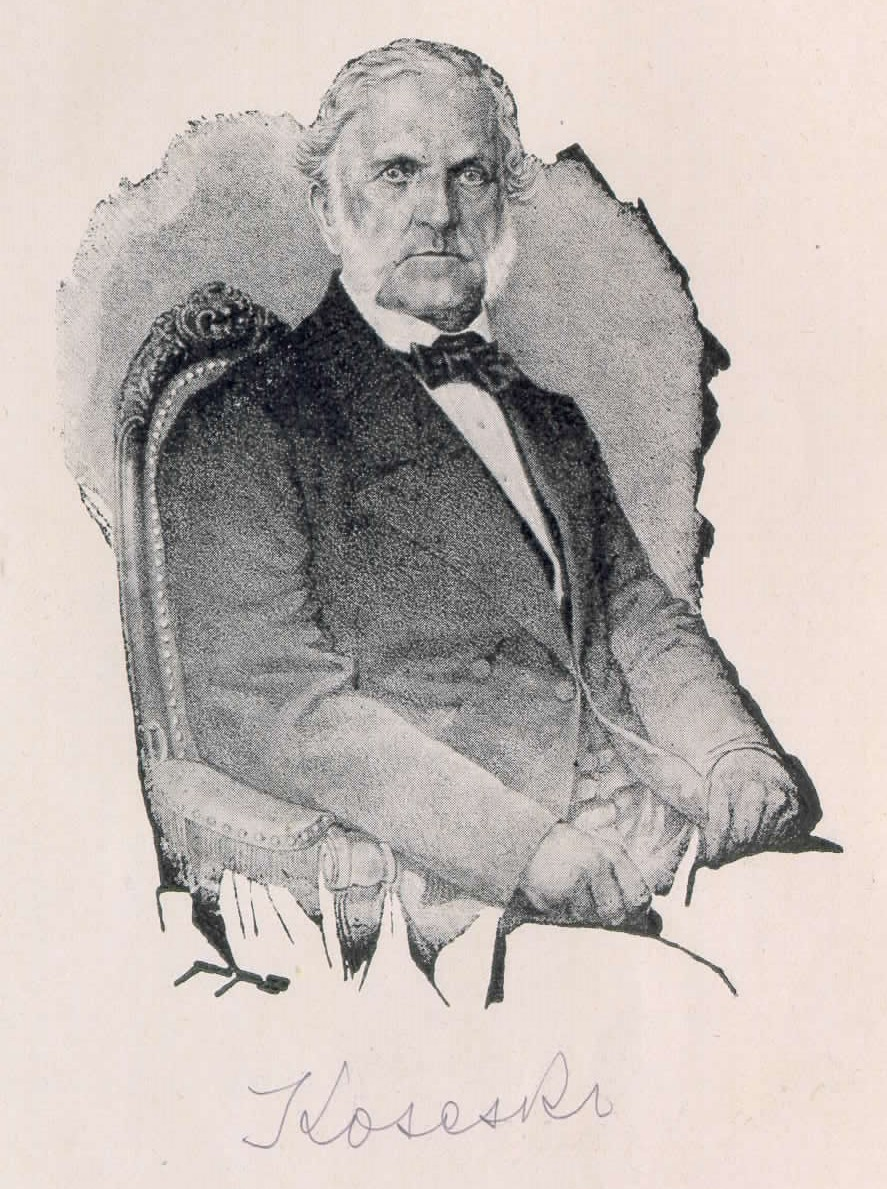
- Born: 12 September 1798; Gorenje (now part of Spodnje Koseze), Habsburg monarchy
- Died: 26 March 1884 (aged 85); Trieste, Austria-Hungary
- Occupations: Lawyer and poet
- Writing career
- Pen name: Jovan Koseski

Janez Vesel (12 September 1798 – 26 March 1884), known by his pen name Jovan Koseski (Slovene conventions also include the names Jovan Vesel – Koseski and, less often, Janez Vesel – Koseski or Ivan Vesel – Koseski (Note: The names Janez, Jovan, and Ivan are all variations of the name 'John'.)) was a Slovene lawyer and poet.

== Life and work ==
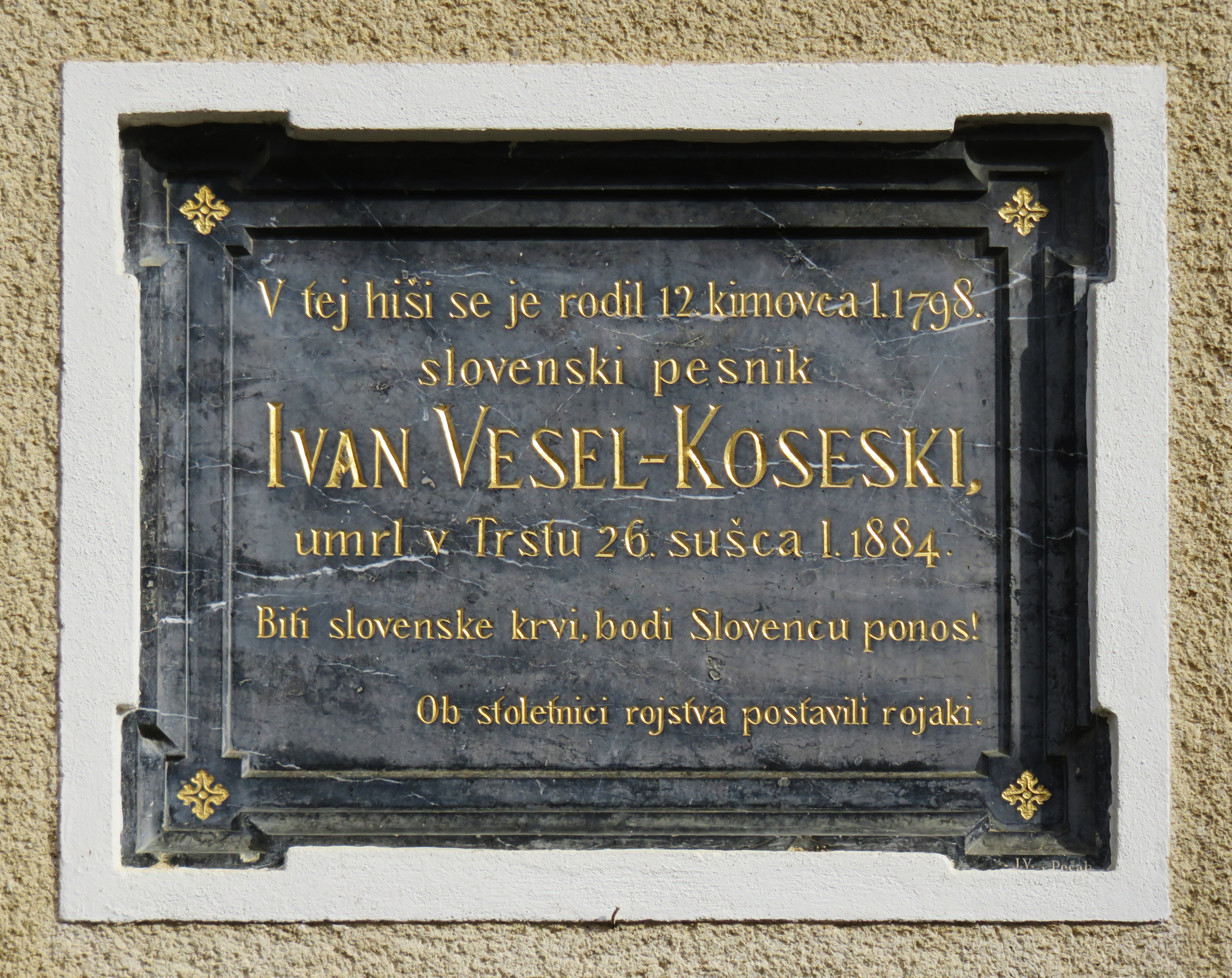
Plaque in Spodnje Koseze marking Vesel's birthplace

Vesel was born in Gorenje (now part of Spodnje Koseze) in the Duchy of Carniola in the Habsburg monarchy (now in Slovenia) and baptized Johannes Vesseu. He studied law in Graz and Vienna and worked in Trieste for most of his professional life. In his student years, he mostly wrote in German. In 1818, his sonnet Potažba (The Comfort) was the first sonnet ever printed in Slovene. No further works by Koseski are known until 1844, when he published his ode Slovenja Caru Ferdinandu (Slovenia to Emperor Ferdinand), dedicated to Emperor Ferdinand. The poem where he describes the history of the Slovene Lands since the Roman times is widely regarded as his best work. Afterwards, he continued writing and also translating poetry. Vesel was a grandfather of the Slovenian mountaineer and author Julius Kugy. He died in Trieste.

== The word Slovenija ==
Vesel's 1844 ode was long considered the earliest known printed use of the word Slovenija 'Slovenia', at the time referring to the Slovene Lands. In the early 1990s, it was found that the word was already printed in 1841 in the book Drevnie i nynešnie Slovene (The Ancient and Modern Slovenes) by the Russian writer Yuriy Venelin.
