= Klanec, Kranj =

Klanec
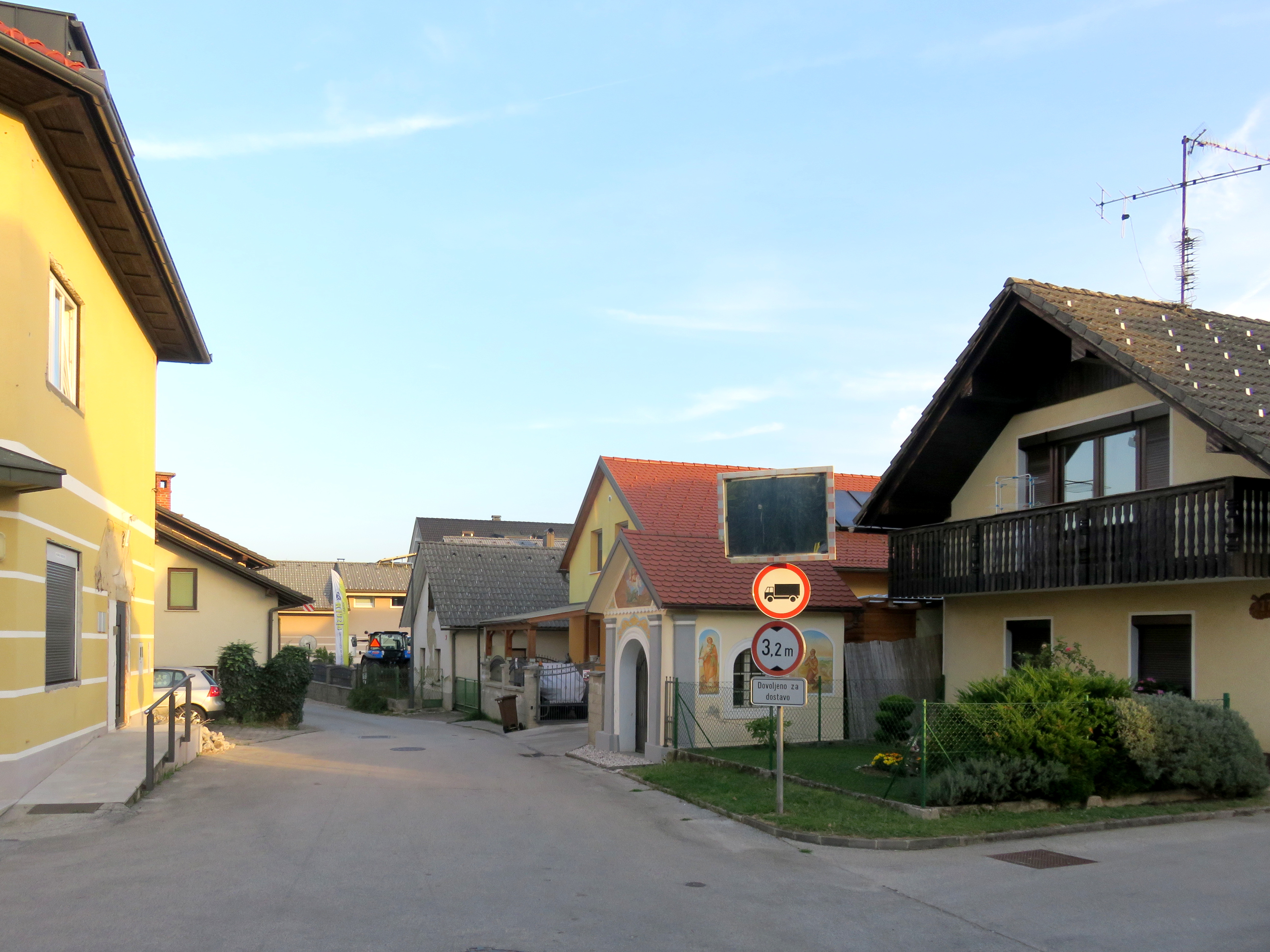

- Location in Slovenia
- Coordinates: 46°14′33.61″N 14°21′47.95″E
- Country: Slovenia
- Traditional region: Upper Carniola
- Statistical region: Upper Carniola
- Municipality: Kranj
- Elevation: 388 m (1,273 ft)

Klanec (pronounced [ˈklaːnəts]; occasionally Klanc, German: Klanz) is a former settlement in the Municipality of Kranj in the Upper Carniola region of Slovenia. It is now part of the city of Kranj. Klanec lies above the left bank of the Kokra River, connected to the center of Kranj by a bridge. The houses in Klanec mingle with those of neighboring Huje and Primskovo, both also former independent settlements.

== Name ==
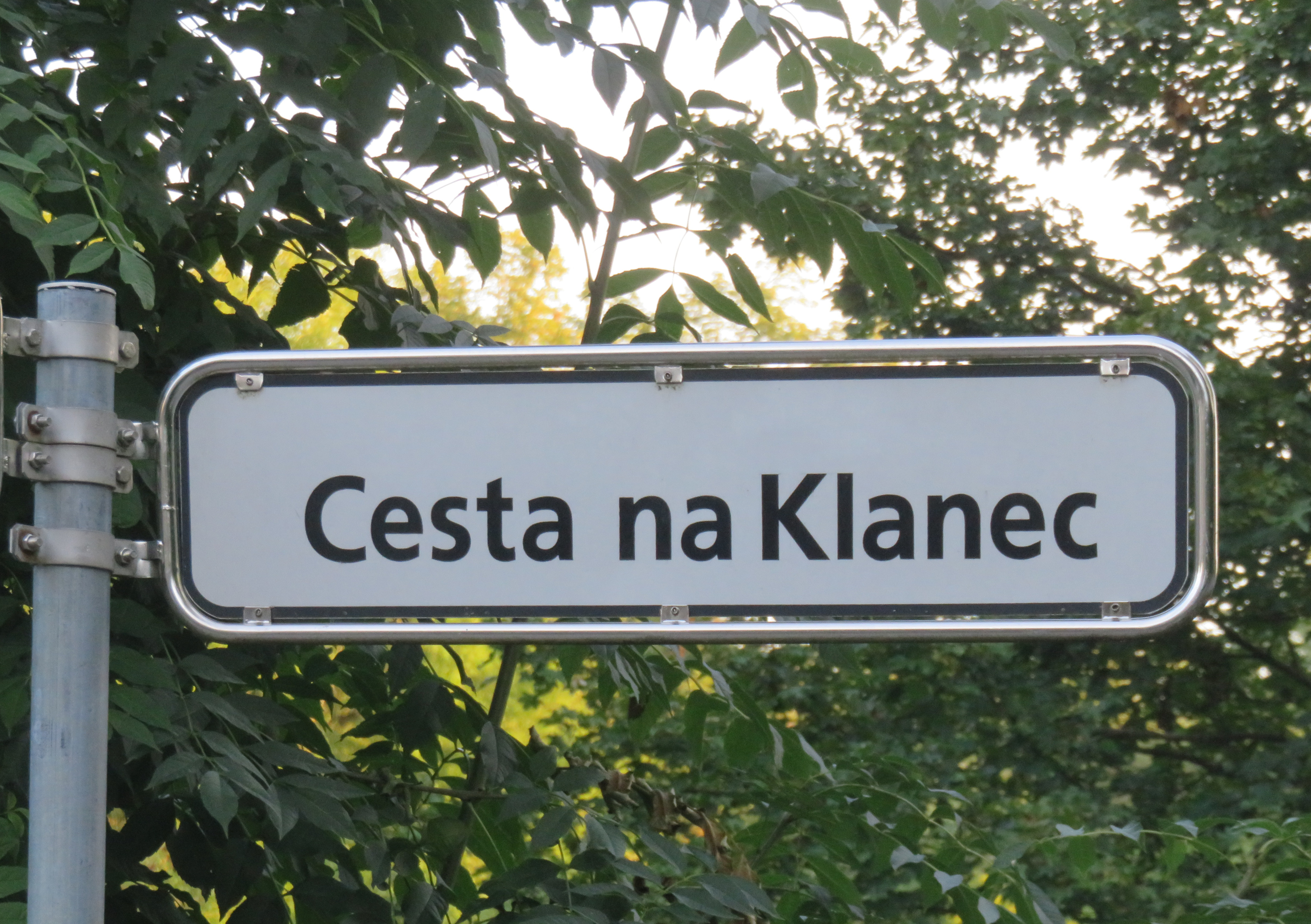
A sign for Cesta na Klanec 'Klanec Street'

The name Klanec is shared with several other settlements in Slovenia. The name is derived from the Slovene common noun klanec, which may variously mean 'steep path upwards', 'path through a narrow area', and 'isolated, tucked-away place'. In the past the German name was Klanz.

== History ==
Klanec was annexed by the city of Kranj in 1957, ending its existence as a separate settlement.

== Notable people ==
Notable people that were born or lived in Klanec include:

- Janez Nikolaj Pogačnik (1678–1755), painter
