= Gorenje, Kranj =

Gorenje
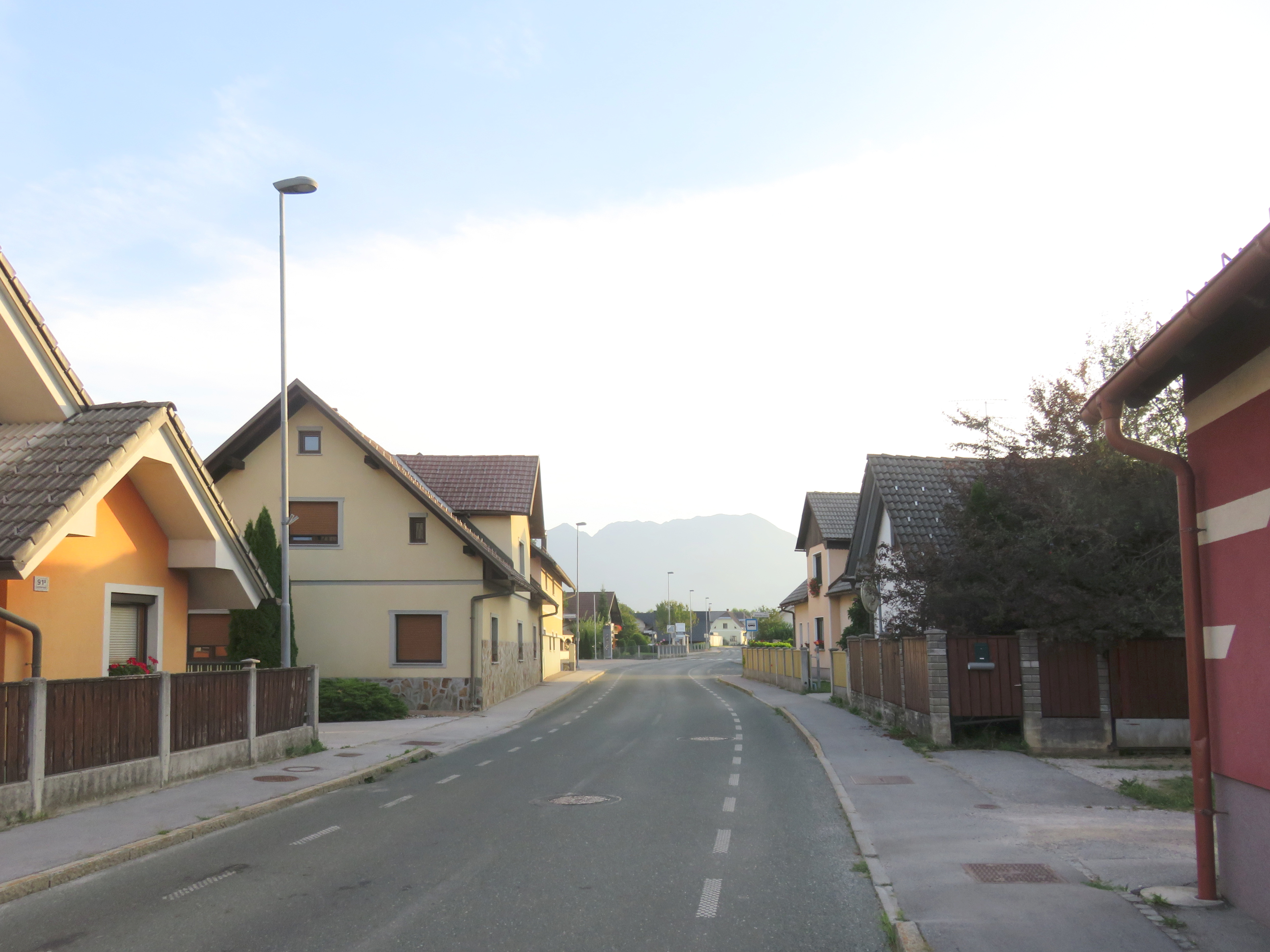

- Location in Slovenia
- Coordinates: 46°15′15″N 14°22′41″E
- Country: Slovenia
- Traditional region: Upper Carniola
- Statistical region: Upper Carniola
- Municipality: Kranj
- Elevation: 399 m (1,309 ft)

Gorenje (pronounced [ɡɔˈɾeːnjɛ]; German: Gorene) is a former settlement in the Municipality of Kranj in the Upper Carniola region of Slovenia. It is now part of the city of Kranj.

== Geography ==
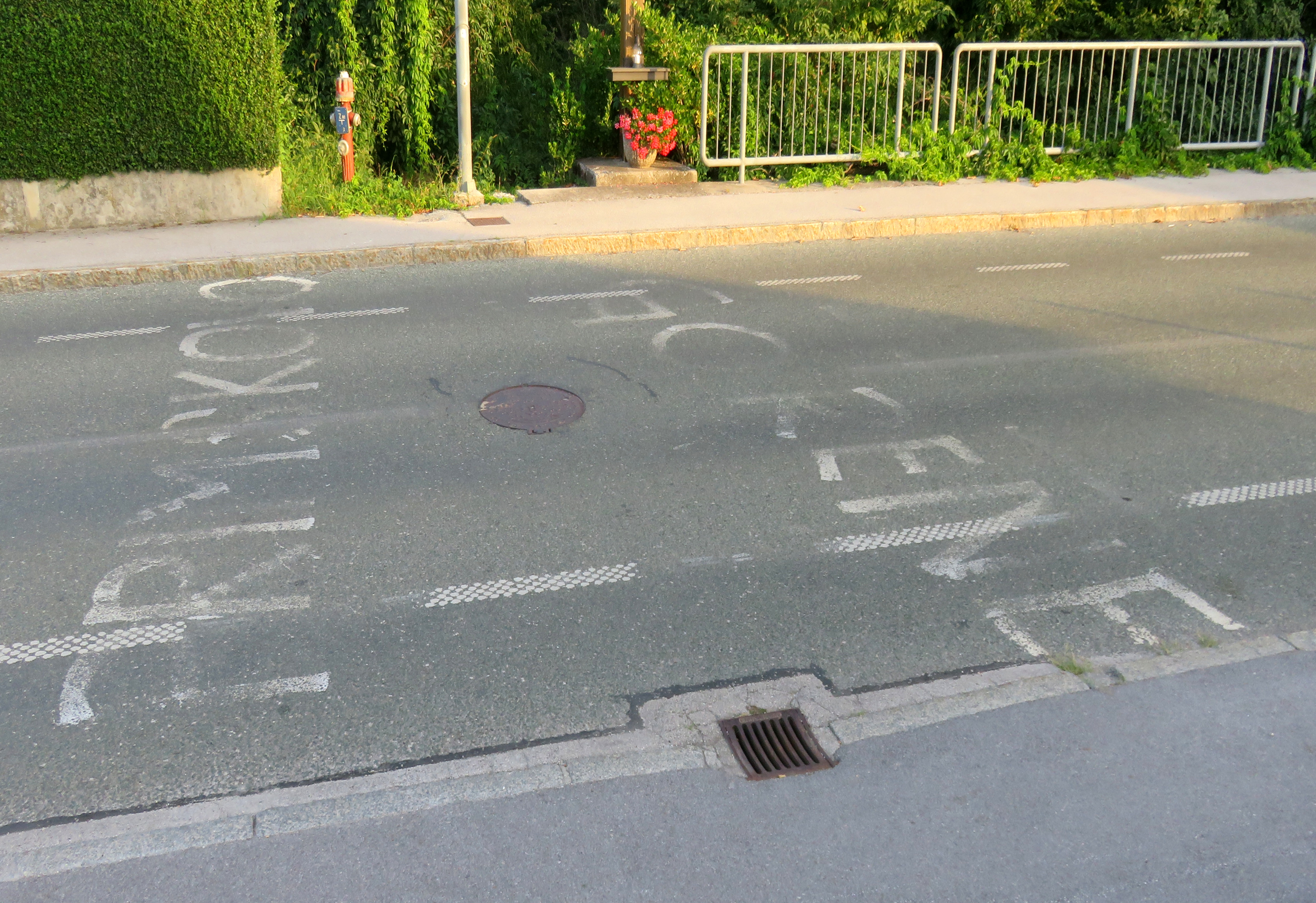
Road marking between Gorenje and Primskovo

Gorenje is located northeast of Kranj's city center and the former village of Primskovo, above the left bank of the Kokra River. The road from Kranj to Zgornje Jezersko runs through the village.

== Name ==
Gorenje was attested in written sources as Goreynach in 1385, Goreyne in 1458, and Gorenach in 1498. The toponym Gorenje appears in various places in Slovenia and may be singular or plural (as in this case). As a plural, it may originate from an ellipsis of the neuter singular *Gorenje selo (literally, 'upper village') that was reanalyzed as a feminine plural, or it may derive from the accusative form (in -e) of the masculine adjective gorenji 'upper', referring to people living in such a location, also reanalyzed as a feminine plural. In either case, the name refers to a settlement at a relatively higher location. Gorenje stands upriver from neighboring Primskovo and is 4 meters (13 ft) higher in elevation.

== History ==
Gorenje had a population of 112 in 21 houses in 1870, 104 in 21 houses in 1880, 83 in 20 houses in 1900, and 100 in 20 houses in 1931. Gorenje was annexed by the city of Kranj in 1957, ending its existence as a separate settlement.
