= Spodnje Koseze =

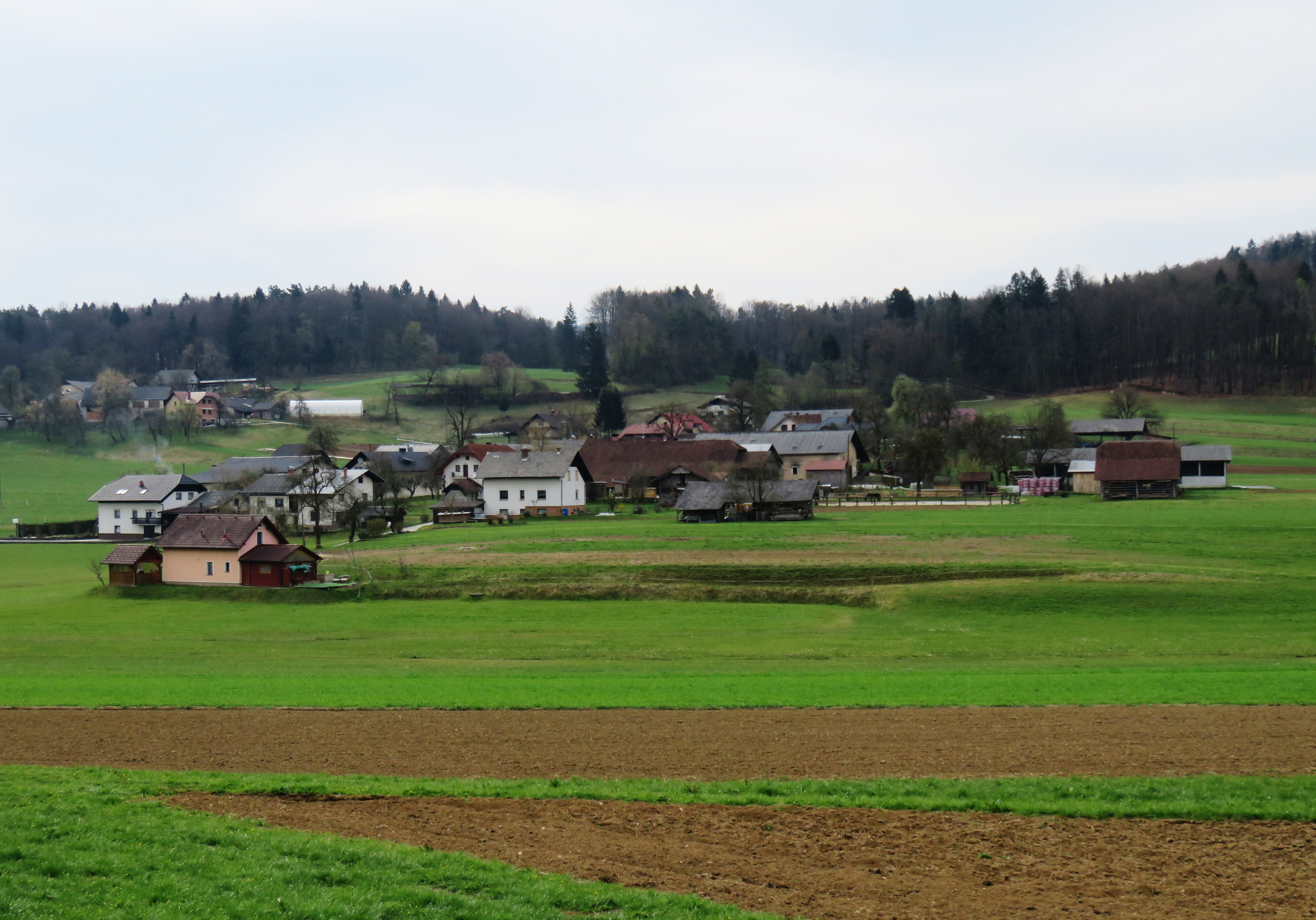

- Location in Slovenia
- Coordinates: 46°8′58.12″N 14°41′20.56″E
- Country: Slovenia
- Region: Upper Carniola
- Statistical region: Central Slovenia
- Municipality: Lukovica

Area
  - Total: 1.08 km^{2} (0.42 sq mi)
- Elevation: 335.9 m (1,102 ft)

Population (2002)
  - Total: 112

Spodnje Koseze (pronounced [ˈspoːdnjɛ kɔˈseːzɛ]; German: Unterkoses) is a village south of Lukovica pri Domžalah in the eastern part of the Upper Carniola region of Slovenia.

== Church ==
The local church, dedicated to Saint Lawrence, stands in Gorenje, which was a separate settlement until 1955.

== Notable people ==
Notable people that were born or lived in Spodnje Koseze include:

- Janez Vesel (a.k.a. Ivan Vesel, Jovan Koseski, 1798–1884), poet
