= Primskovo, Kranj =

Primskovo
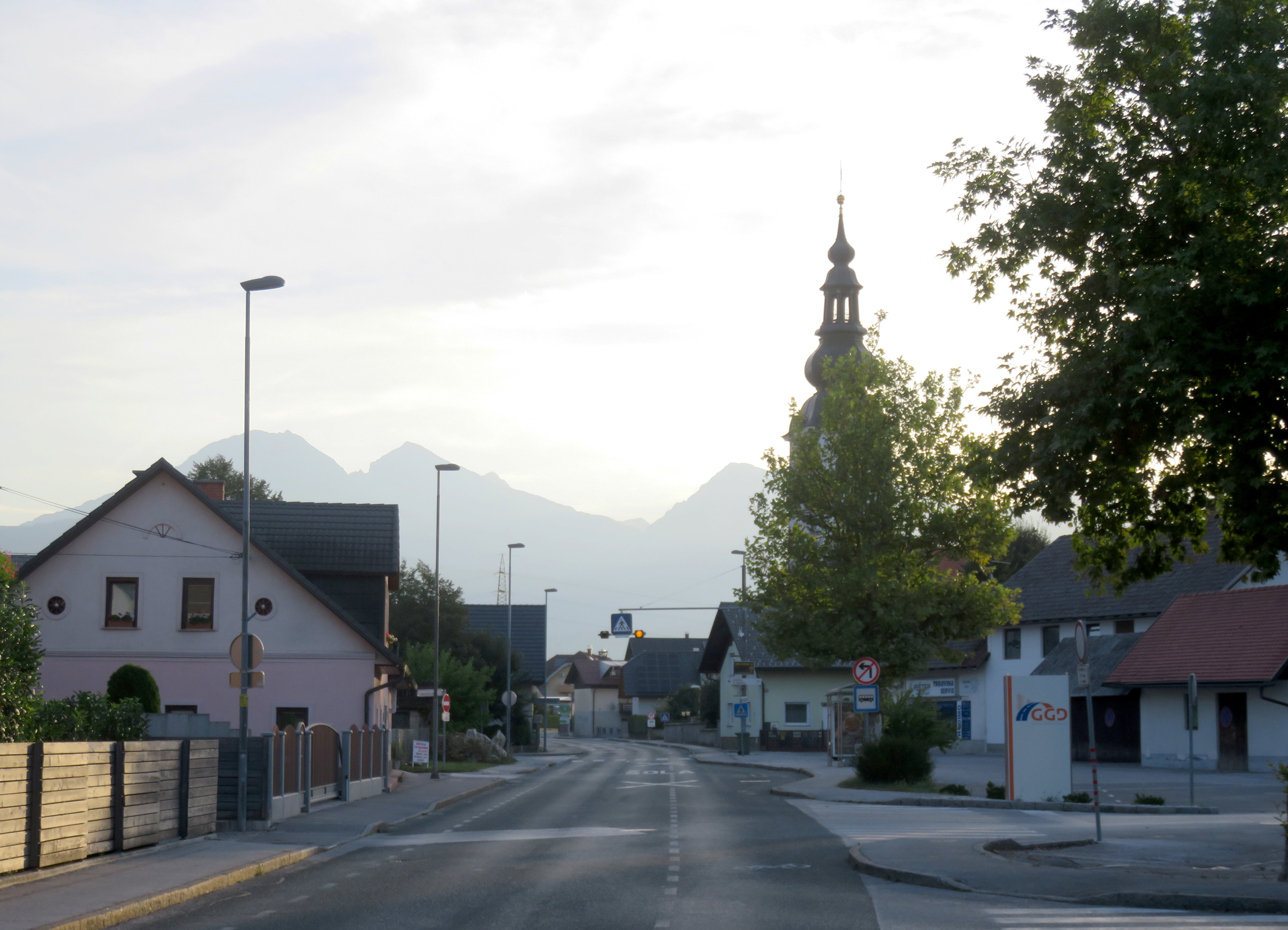

- Location in Slovenia
- Coordinates: 46°14′49.07″N 14°22′14.07″E
- Country: Slovenia
- Traditional region: Upper Carniola
- Statistical region: Upper Carniola
- Municipality: Kranj
- Elevation: 395 m (1,296 ft)

Primskovo (pronounced [ˈpɾiːmskɔʋɔ]; German: Primskau or Primskou) is a former settlement in the Municipality of Kranj in the Upper Carniola region of Slovenia. It is now part of the city of Kranj. Primskovo lies above the left bank of the Kokra River, connected to the center of Kranj by a bridge 28 m above the gorge of the river, offering an impressive view. The houses in Primskovo mingle with those of neighboring Klanec, also a former independent settlement.

== Name ==
The name Primskovo is probably derives from an adjective form of the Slavic common noun *prijьmьskъ 'son-in-law that settles on the bride's farm', shortened from a longer name such as Prijьmьskovo selo/polje (literally, 'son-in-law's village/field'). It may also be derived from the (unconfirmed) nickname *Primъ, meaning 'Primъ's (village/field)'. In the past the German name was Primskau or Primskou.

== History ==
The remains of a stronghold built for protection against Ottoman attacks are visible in Primskovo. A primary school with four grades was established in the village in 1890. Primskovo was annexed by the city of Kranj in 1957, ending its existence as a separate settlement.

== Church ==
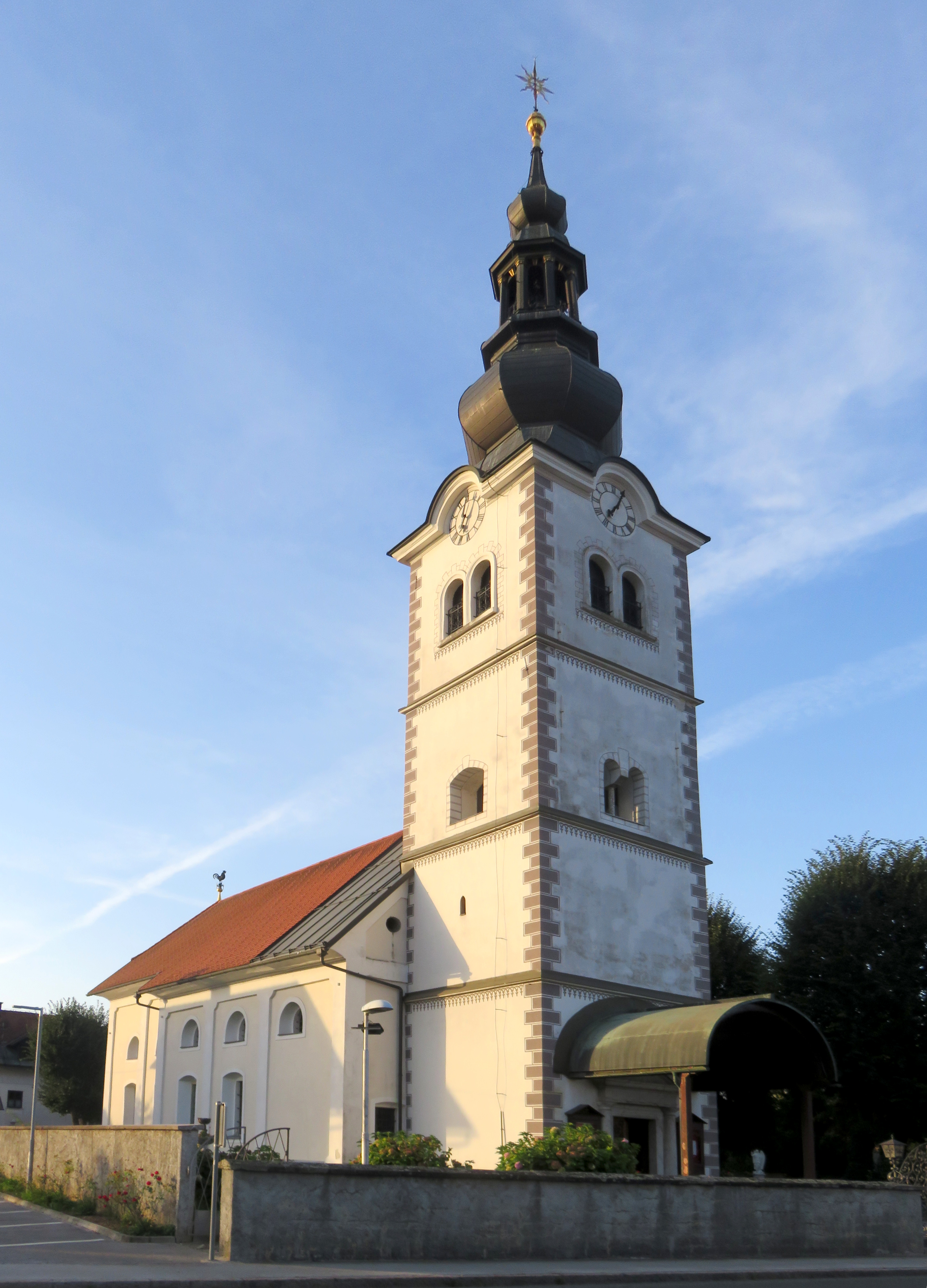
View from the north

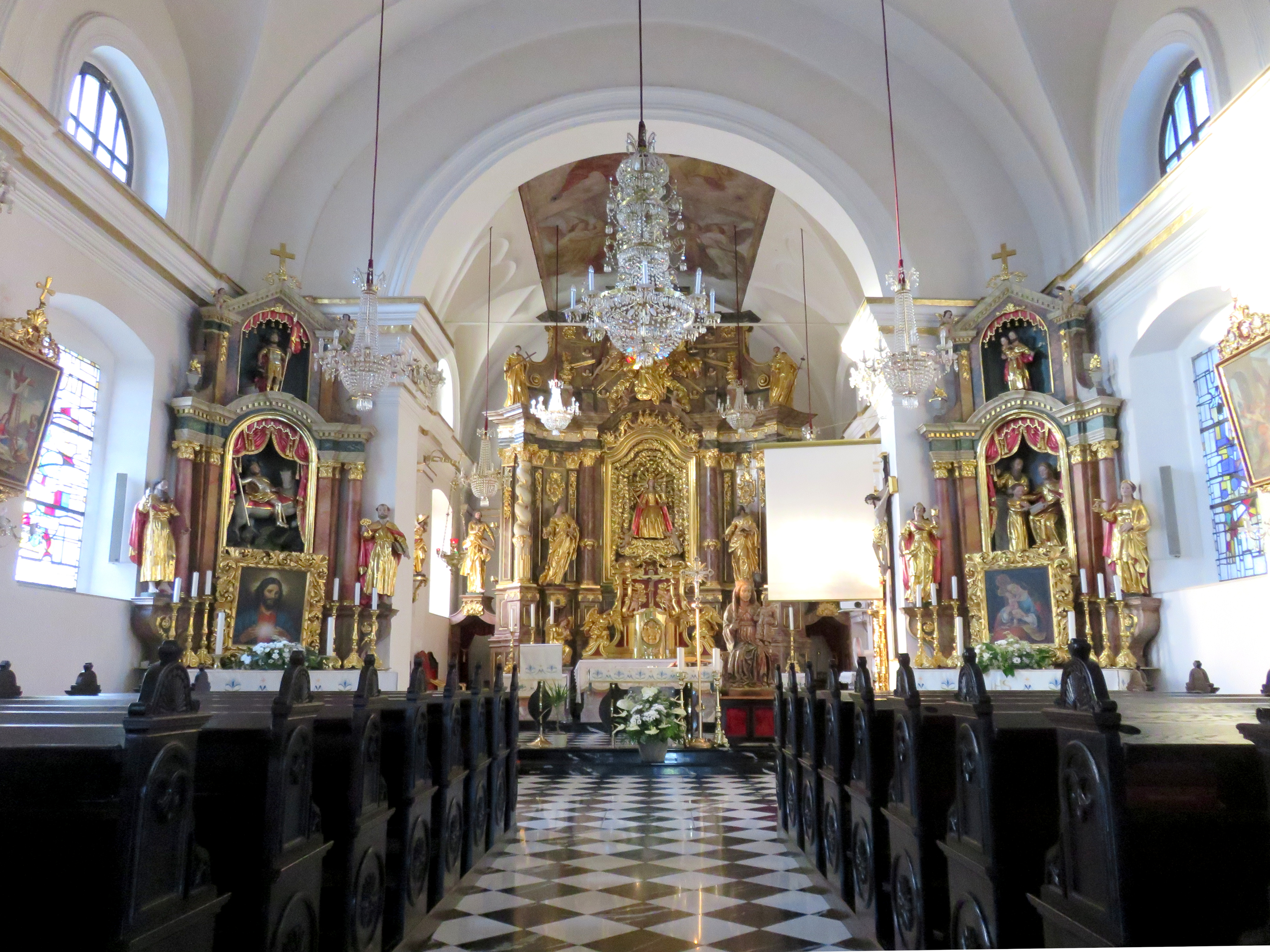
Interior

Assumption Church

The parish church in Primskovo is dedicated to the Assumption of Mary. It was first mentioned in written sources in 1631 in a visitation inventory. The current structure was built in 1729 as a chapel of ease of the Parish of Preddvor. The church was the seat of a chapelry from 1793 to 1814. It was elevated to the Parish of Kranj-Primskovo on 7 June 1965.

== Notable people ==
Notable people that were born or lived in Primskovo include:

- Anton Lizokar (1857–1933), businessman and politician
- Janko Rogelj (1895–1965), writer and journalist
