= Dialog (newspaper) =

Free weekly newspaper in Varna City, Bulgaria

Dialog (Bulgarian: Диалог), is a free weekly newspaper with only positive information and news from Varna city, Bulgaria, Europe.

The newspaper's first issue came out on 30 March 2007 with the biggest circulation in Varna region. The main idea of Dialog newspaper is to bring warmth and optimism, a sense for an orientation and direction in the world, to prove that life is a challenge and that it has to be lived in the best way. Its editor-in-chief is Svetlozar Nikolov.
