= A Dialogue =

1973 book by James Baldwin and Nikki Giovanni

- First edition cover
- Authors: James Baldwin and Nikki Giovanni
- Subject: Race relations
- Publisher: J. B. Lippincott & Co.
- Publication date: 1973
- Dewey Decimal: 301.45196073

A Dialogue is a 1973 collaborative work featuring a multi-topic conversation between writers James Baldwin and Nikki Giovanni. The preface was written by Ida Lewis, the afterword by Orde M. Coombs. It was published by J. B. Lippincott & Co.

The book was an adaptation of a 1971 conversation Baldwin and Giovanni had on the television series Soul!
