= Bobovek =

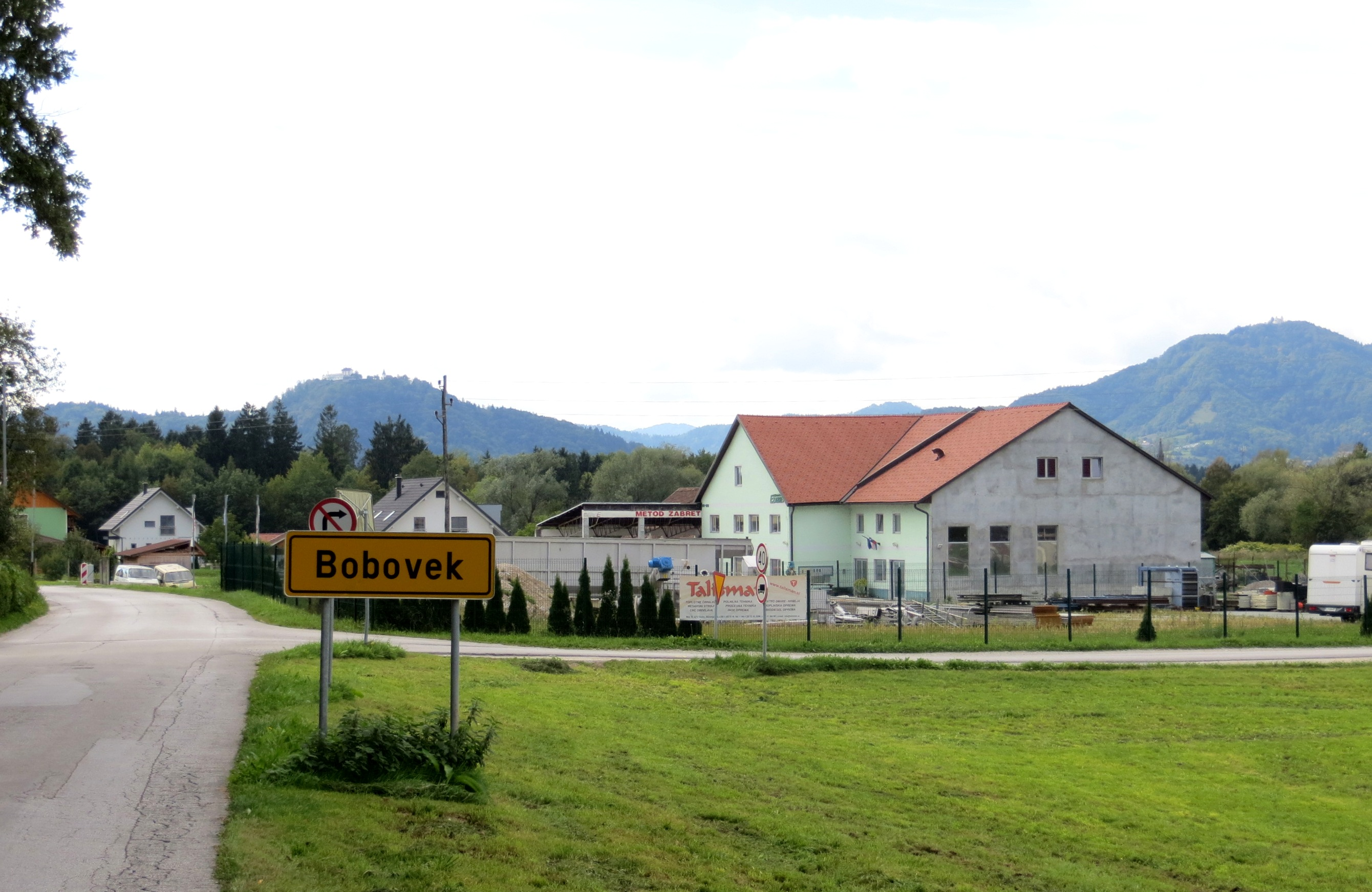

- Location in Slovenia
- Coordinates: 46°16′28.4″N 14°21′52.14″E
- Country: Slovenia
- Traditional region: Upper Carniola
- Statistical region: Upper Carniola
- Municipality: Kranj

Area
  - Total: 0.45 km^{2} (0.17 sq mi)
- Elevation: 410.7 m (1,347 ft)

Population (2002)
  - Total: 138

Bobovek (pronounced [bɔˈbɔːʋək] or [bɔˈboːʋək]) is a small settlement in the Municipality of Kranj in the Upper Carniola region of Slovenia.

== Geography ==
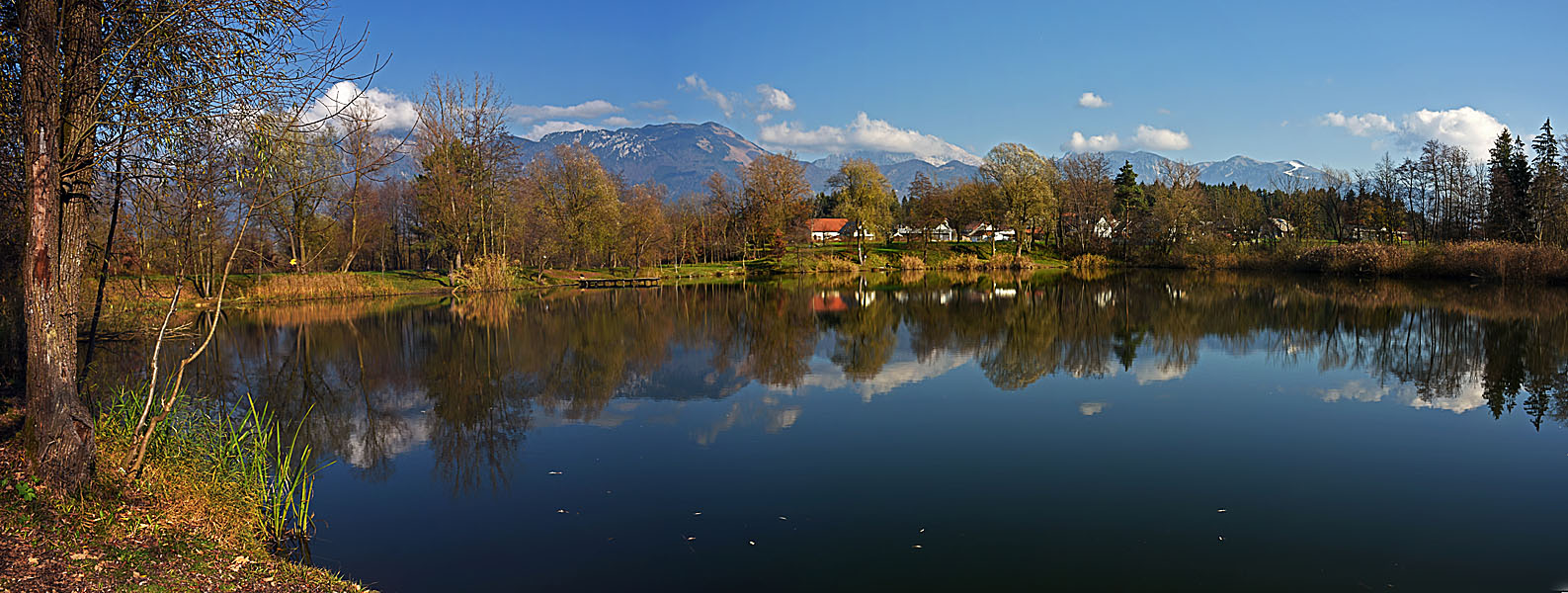
Former clay pits near Bobovek

West of the settlement, two former clay pits have formed small lakes with a unique biotope, which is now a protected nature reserve. Mammoth remains, as well as fossilized remains of shoals of common dace, have been discovered in the clay layers.

== Name ==
Bobovek was attested in written sources as Wobovik in 1399 and Bobwnig in 1417, among other spellings.

== Gallery ==
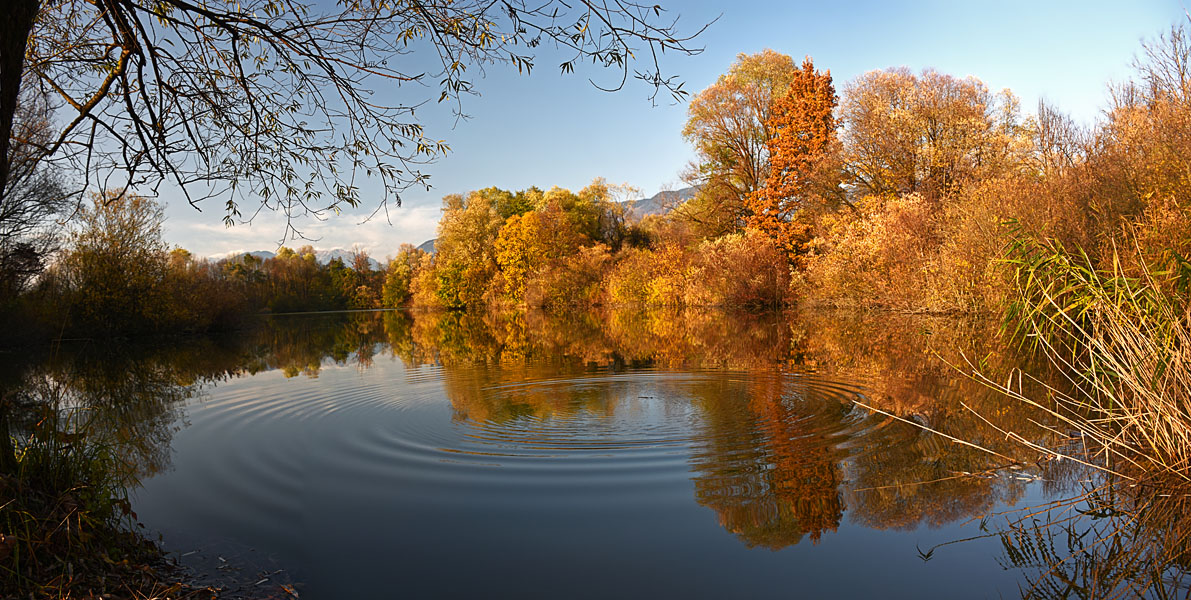
Northern lake (Krokodilnica)
