= Gorenje, Spodnje Koseze =

Gorenje
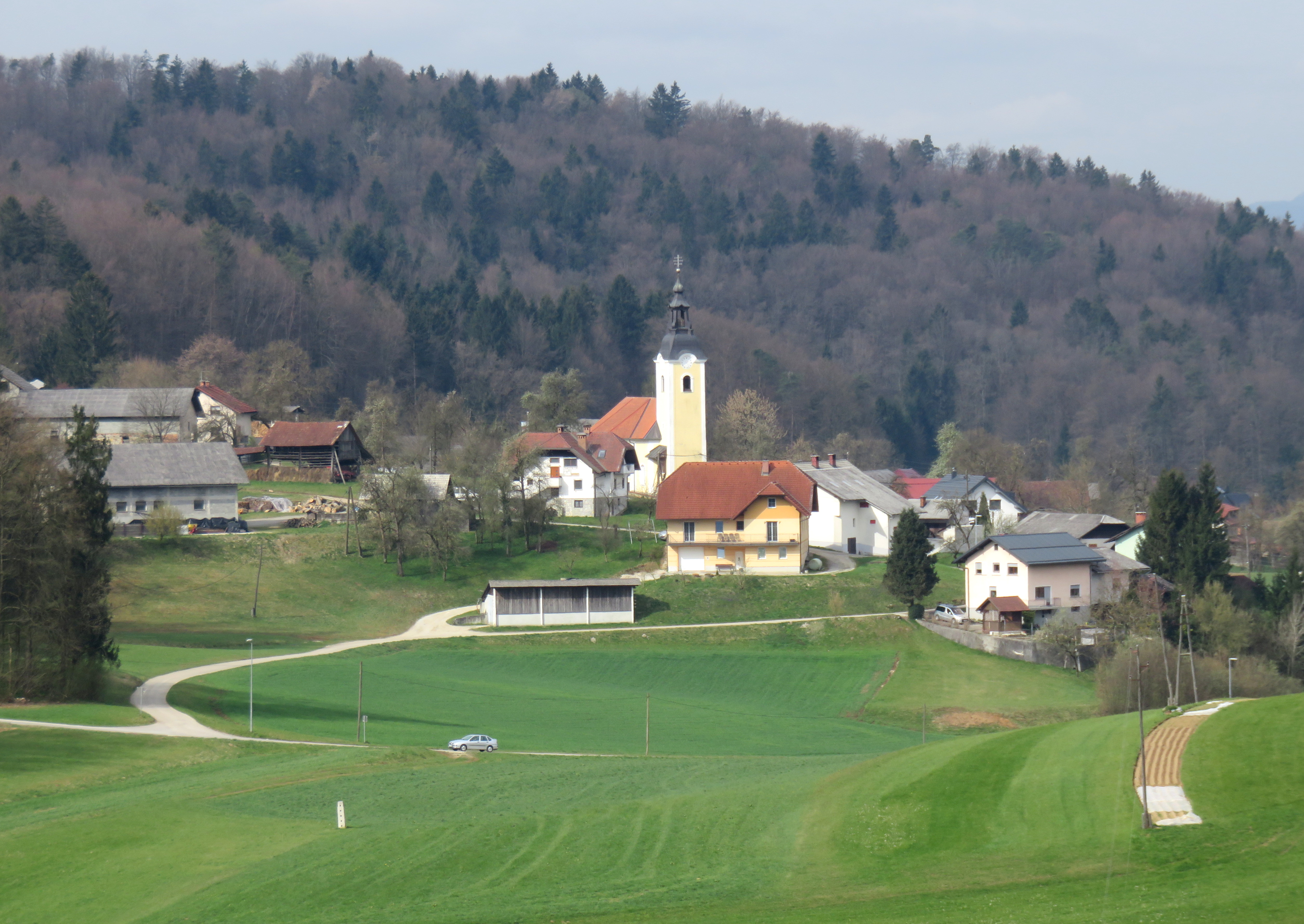

- Location in Slovenia
- Coordinates: 46°08′57″N 14°41′33″E
- Country: Slovenia
- Traditional region: Upper Carniola
- Statistical region: Central Slovenia
- Municipality: Lukovica
- Elevation: 355 m (1,165 ft)

Gorenje (pronounced [ɡɔˈɾeːnjɛ], German: Goreine) is a former village in central Slovenia in the Municipality of Lukovica. It is now part of the village of Spodnje Koseze. It is part of the traditional region of Upper Carniola and is now included in the Central Slovenia Statistical Region.

== Geography ==
Gorenje stands on a terrace above the road from Lukovica pri Domžalah to Moravče.

== Name ==
The name Gorenje is shared by several settlements in Slovenia. It arose through ellipsis of Gorenje selo (literally, 'upper village'), denoting the elevation of the place in relation to a neighboring settlement. Gorenje stands about 29 meters (95 ft) higher than neighboring Spodnje Koseze.

== History ==
Gorenje had a population of 53 (in nine houses) in 1900 and 47 (in seven houses) in 1931.

During the Second World War, the Partisans stored food and equipment nearby to supply a recruitment center. In August 1943, the Partisans built a bunker in Gorenje to treat wounded soldiers, and the Partisans' economic committee for the Lukovica region was based in Gorenje.

Gorenje was annexed by Spodnje Koseze in 1955, ending its existence as a separate settlement.

== Church ==
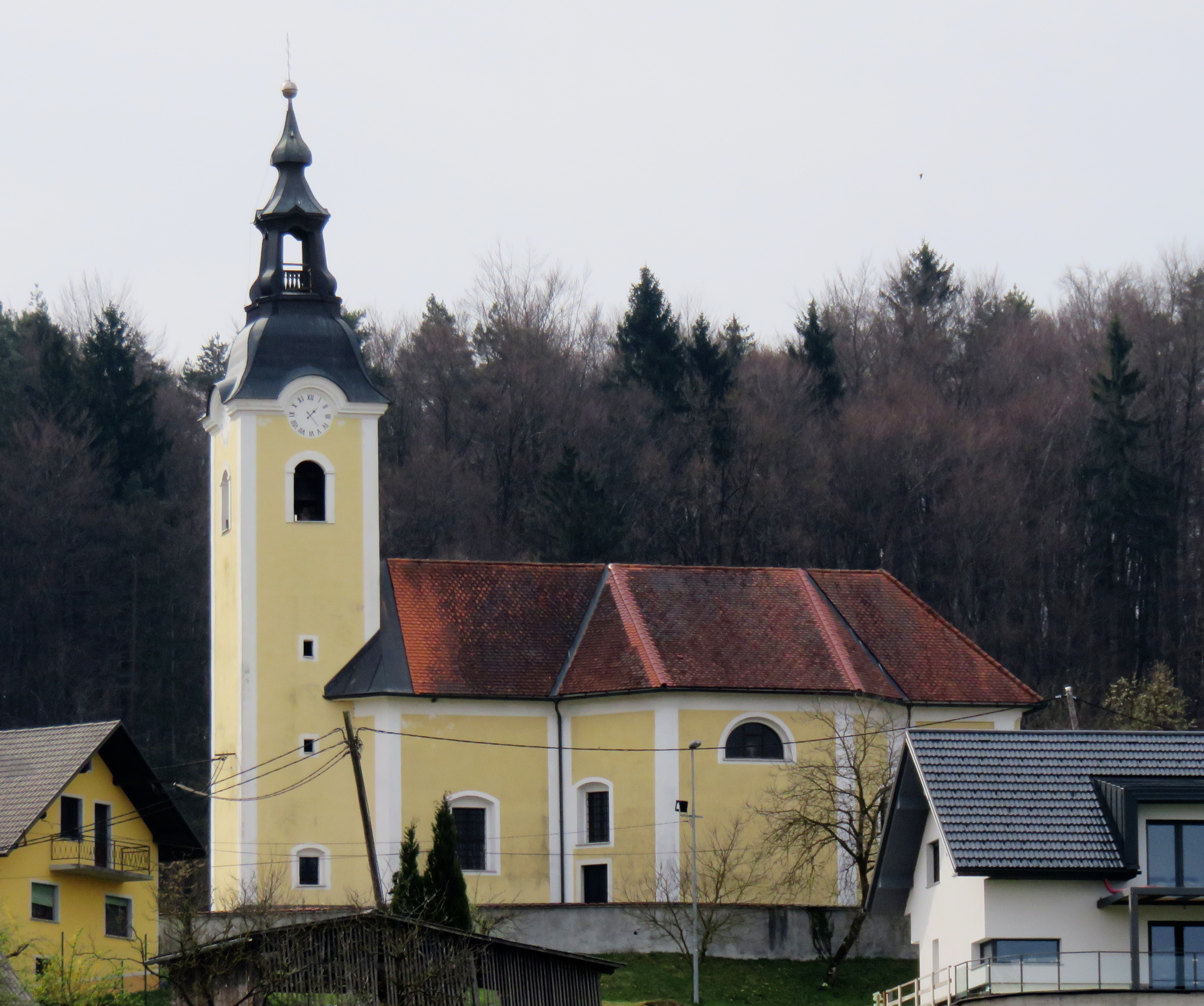
Saint Lawrence's Church

The local church in Gorenje, which also serves Spodnje Koseze, is dedicated to Saint Lawrence. It is a Baroque structure with a cupola vault, and the main altar dates from the 19th century. The paintings in the church were created by Gašpar Luka Goetzl (1782–1857) around 1843.
