= Huje, Kranj =

Huje
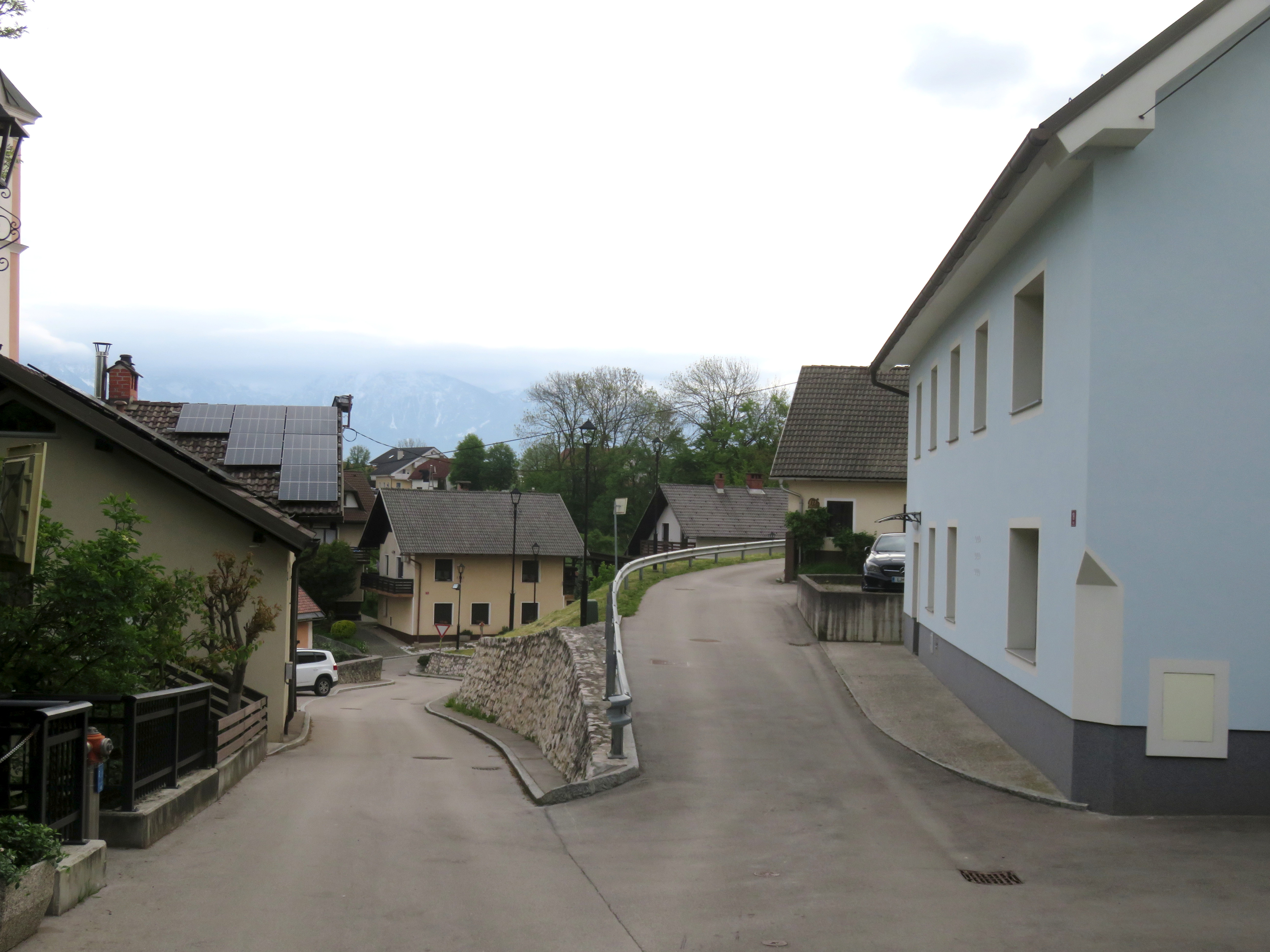

- Location in Slovenia
- Coordinates: 46°14′28.44″N 14°21′34.18″E
- Country: Slovenia
- Traditional region: Upper Carniola
- Statistical region: Upper Carniola
- Municipality: Kranj
- Elevation: 383 m (1,257 ft)

Huje (pronounced [ˈxuːjɛ]) is a former settlement in the Municipality of Kranj in the Upper Carniola region of Slovenia. It now corresponds to the neighborhood of Huje in Kranj. Huje lies on left bank of the Kokra River directly east of the old town center of Kranj, which it is connected to by two bridges.

== Name ==
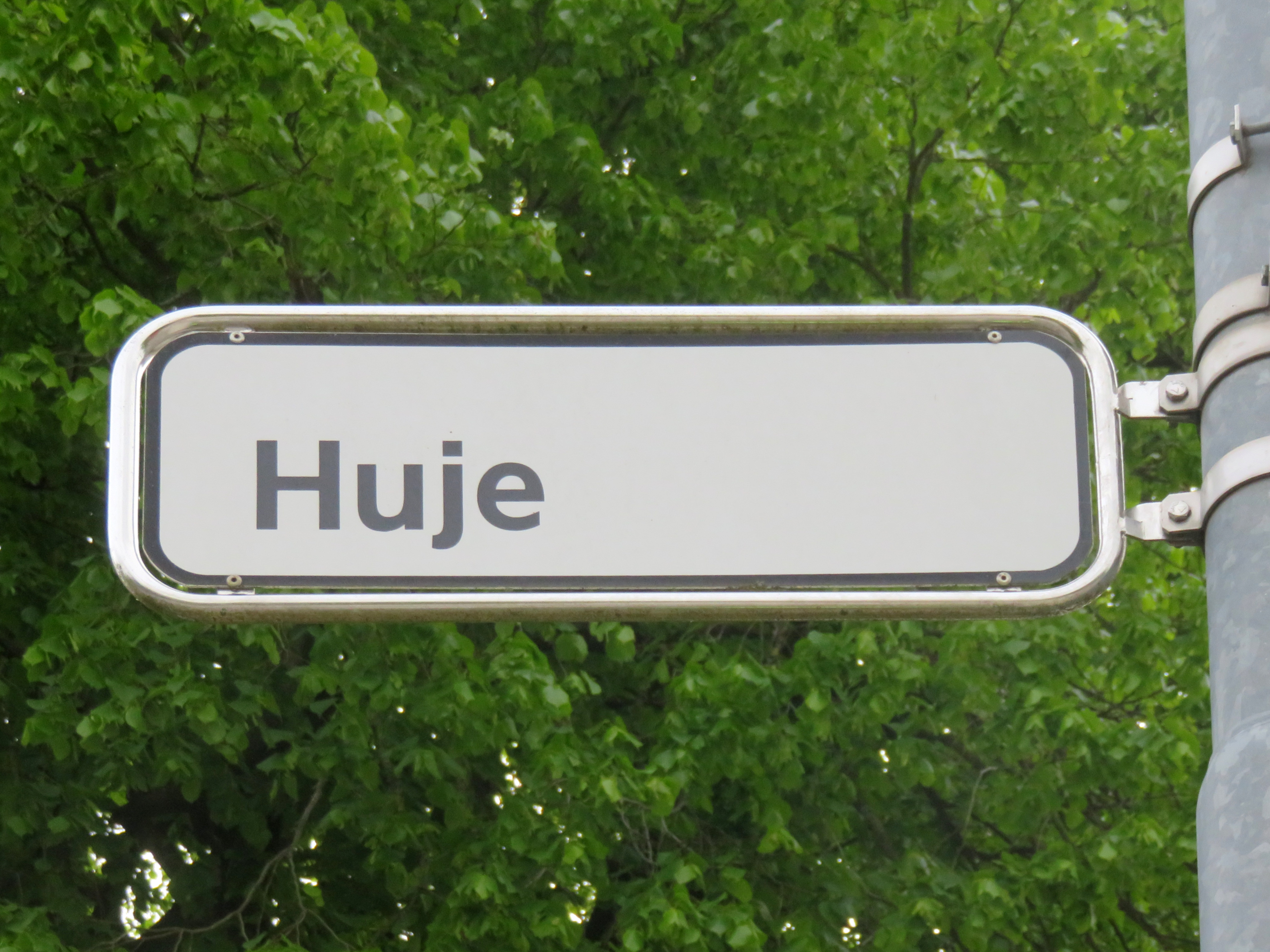
Sign for Huje (Huje Street)

Huje was mentioned in written sources in 1306 as Chuiach (and as Chvyach in 1308 and Chaud in 1397). It is derived from the plural demonym *Xuďane 'residents of poor-quality land'.

== History ==
Huje maintained a separate identity from the town of Kranj into the 20th century because of its markedly rural character and the deep river canyon separating it from the town. Huje was annexed by the city of Kranj in 1957, ending its existence as a separate settlement.

== Church ==
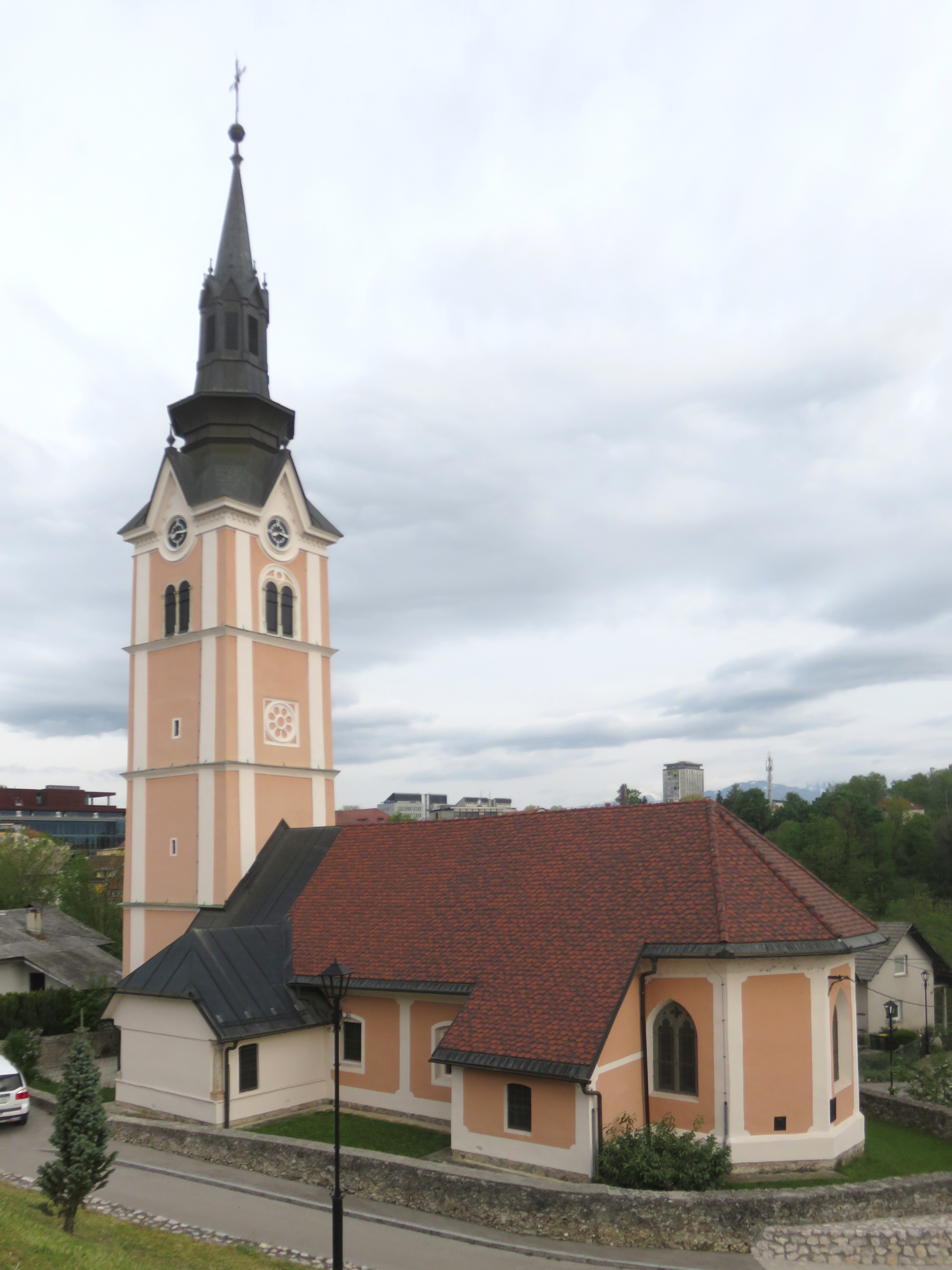
Saint Joseph's Church

The church in Huje is dedicated to Saint Joseph. It was consecrated in 1686 and was originally built as a Gothic structure. Until the end of the 18th century, the church belonged to the Parish of Šenčur.
