= Gorenje Dialog =

1980s microcomputer system

- Developer: Gorenje
- Type: Microcomputer
- Operating system: FEDOS (CP/M 2.2 compatible)
- CPU: Zilog Z-80A @ 4 MHz

Dialog was a microcomputer system developed by Gorenje in 1980s. It was based on the 8-bit 4 MHz Zilog Z-80A microprocessor. The primary operating system was FEDOS (CP/M 2.2 compatible), developed by Computer Structures and Systems Laboratory (Faculty of Electrical Engineering, University of Ljubljana) and Gorenje.

There were three variants of the Dialog microcomputer system, distinguished only by minor changed: home, laboratory and personal (PC) (in Slovene: hišni, laboratorijski, osebni). Three types of external memory can be connected with Dialog: cassette recorder, floppy drive (5,25" and 8") and hard drive. The home variant of Dialog used resident FEBASIC (a variant of BASIC).
