= Ericsson Dialog =

Swedish telephone model

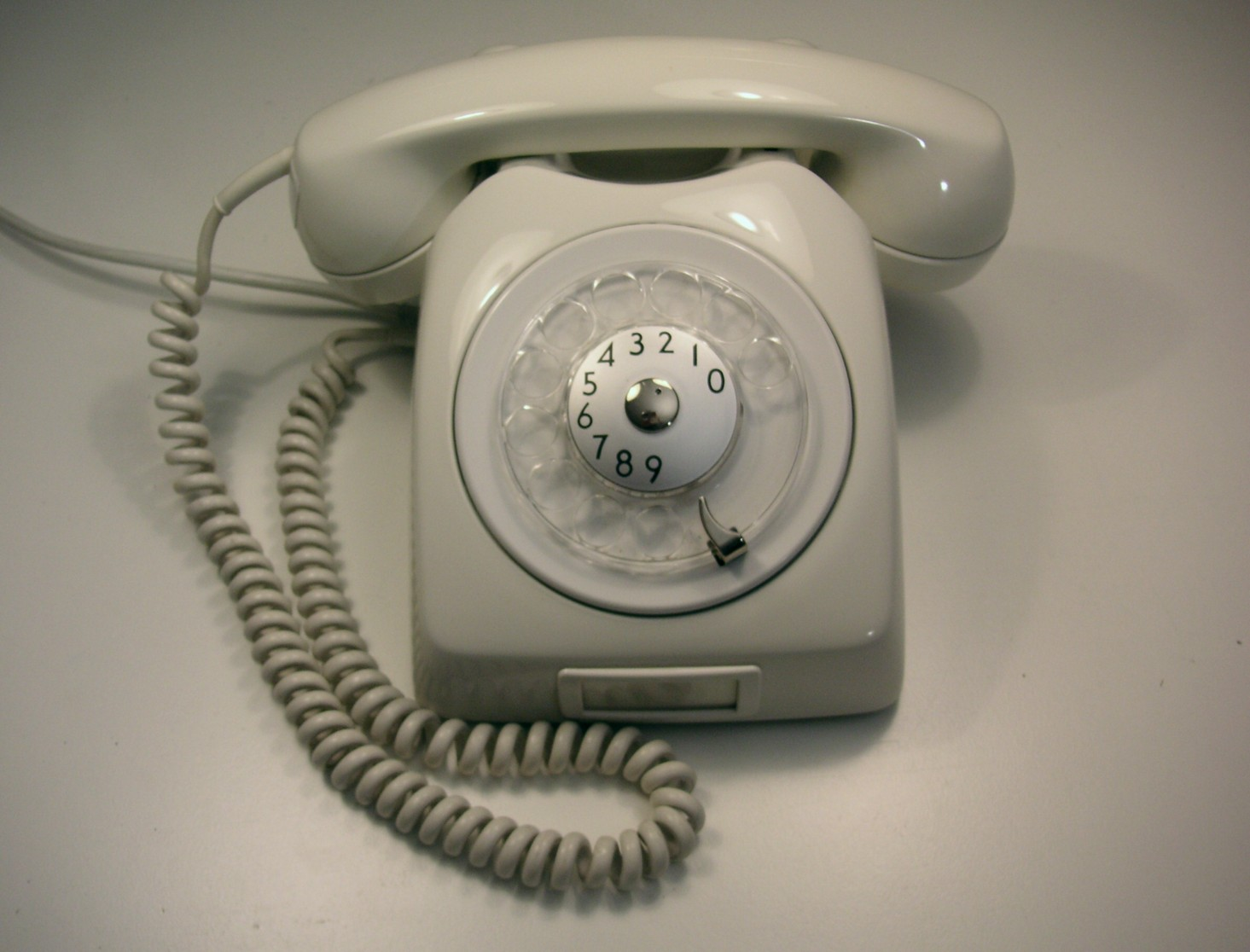

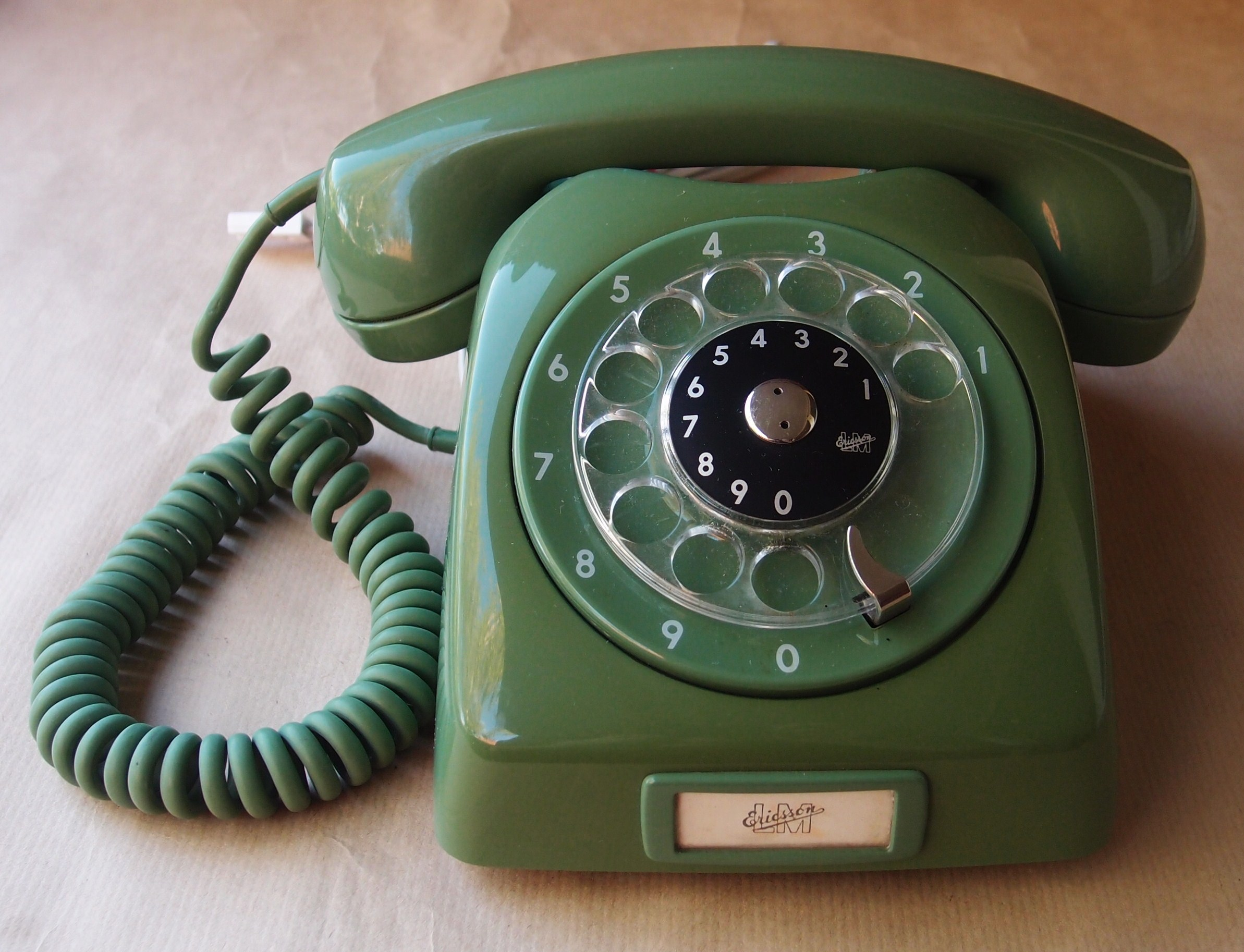

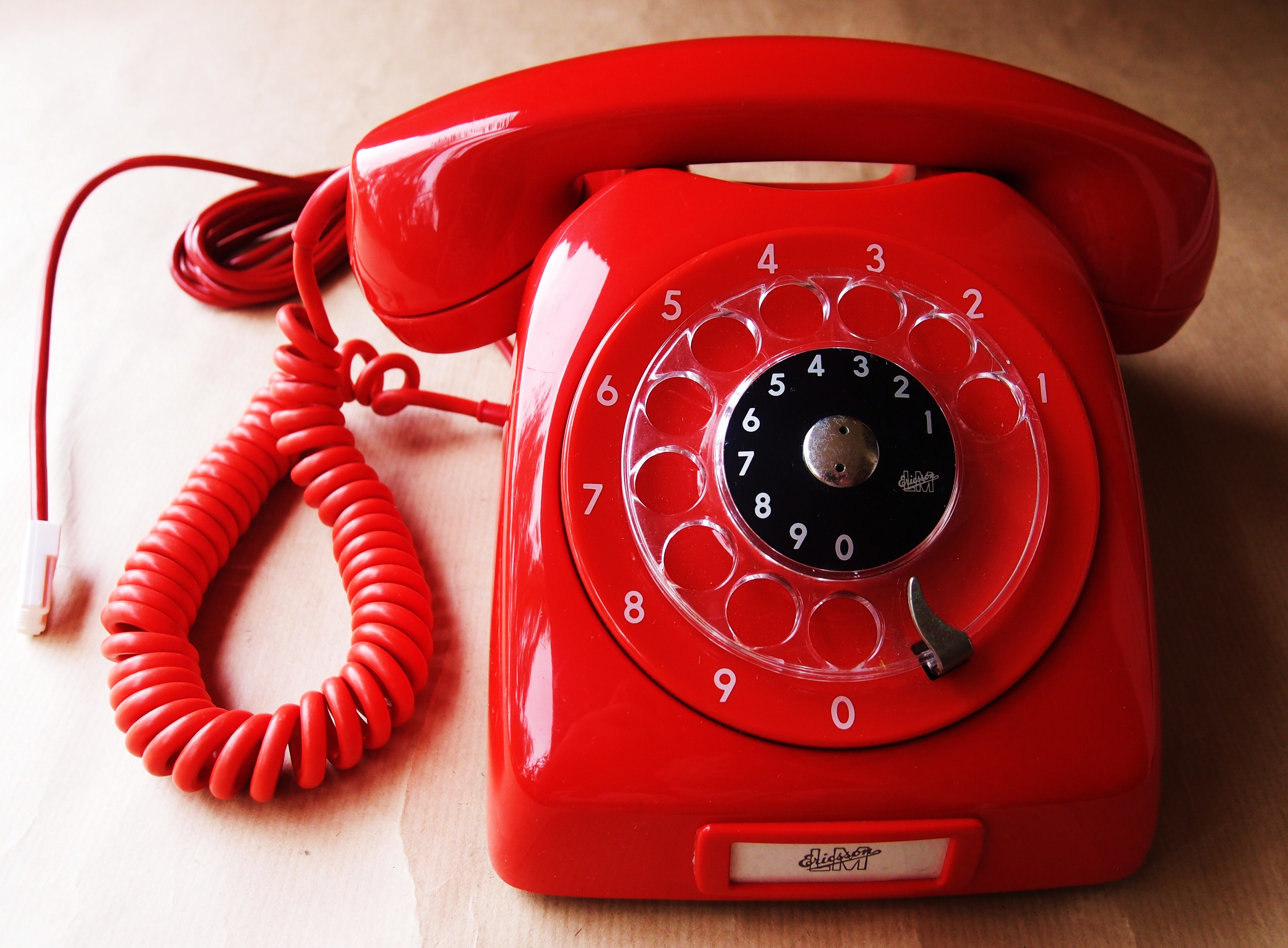

Ericsson Dialog is a Swedish telephone model by Ericsson, released 1964. Millions of the model were sold and it retained its place in homes well into the 1990s. The Ericsson company presented King Carl XVI Gustaf of Sweden with a unique handmade Dialog telephone on his 40th birthday.

In the early 1960s Ericsson hired the Swedish architecture and design company Ahlgren, Olsson & Silow (AOS) to develop Dialog, a new standard telephone that was to apply high end technology and reach international markets. Dialog attained great popularity and maintained its place within homes into the 1990s. This design classic has become an object of desire amongst collectors and telephone enthusiasts. New technology and the increased liberties in form resulted in the end of the era of number disc telephones. The 1972 version of the phone, equipped with buttons in place of the rotary dial, never became as popular as its predecessor.

The Norwegian telephone 11AB22 introduced by Elektrisk Bureau in 1967 used the same shell as Dialog, but had different electronics. The 11AB22 was the world's first transistorized telephone, and unlike the Ericsson Dialog used an electronic ringer instead of bells, and was equipped with a dynamic microphone.

== Design process ==
Due to the massive amount of telephones intended to be produced, uncommonly heavy emphasis was put on design. The exemplars for the future basic telephone of every home were Ericsson's own models from the 1930s. Dialog was to be modern, yet follow Ericsson's design tradition. The ergonomics of the handle was a focal point in the design. Additionally, the acoustic, production, and aesthetic aspects needed to be resolved.

The handset was fitted in size according to the dimensions of an average face, which had been taken as the starting point of the design process. In the completed product, the distance between the transmitter (mouth piece) and the receiver (ear phone) was noticeably shorter than earlier models. The handset was made as light as possible to minimize the stress inflicted upon the wrist and blood veins of the speaker during long calls. The weight of the base unit was also minimized especially for logistical and packaging reasons. The dial finger wheel and face plate consisted of several parts and was designed so that it could be replaced with a set of buttons in a later version of the phone.

The depth and thoroughness of the design is perhaps best depicted by the fact that even the inner lighting of the phone was taken into account: the inside was not left completely dark, to avoid insects inhabiting the product.

== Materials ==
The material of the telephone shell was acrylonitrile butadiene styrene (ABS), a thermoplastic polymer with high impact strength and glossy appearance. The use of plastics offered new possibilities as to the form and color of the product.

== Other sources ==
- Lasse Brunnström: Svensk Industridesign – en 1900-talshistoria. (Norstedts)
