= Lukovica pri Domžalah =

- Village
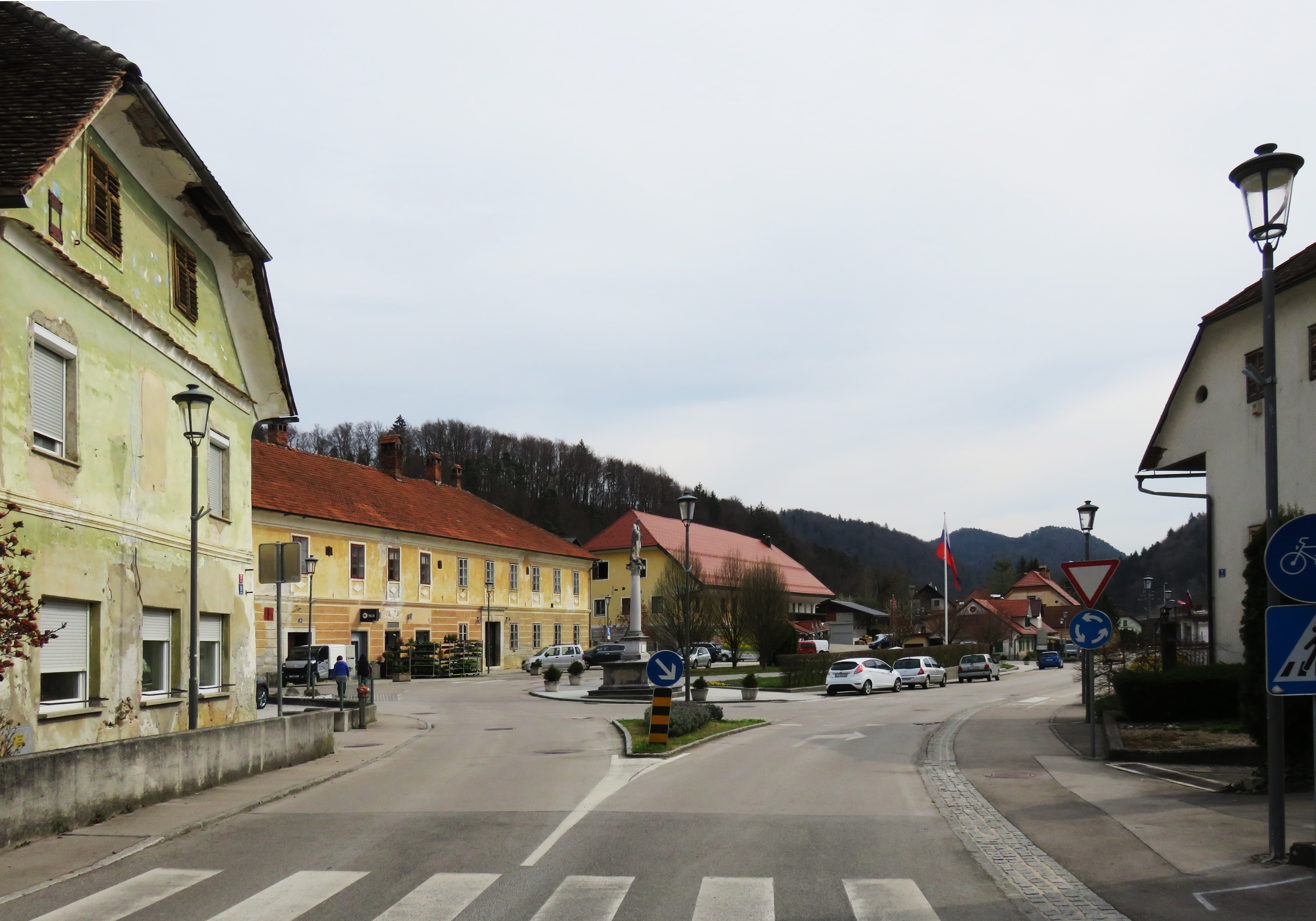
- Lukovica pri Domžalah

- Location in Slovenia
- Coordinates: 46°10′6.79″N 14°41′21.11″E
- Country: Slovenia
- Traditional region: Upper Carniola
- Statistical region: Central Slovenia
- Municipality: Lukovica
- Elevation: 340.1 m (1,116 ft)

Population (2002)
  - Total: 438
- Post code: 1225
- Area code: 01

Lukovica pri Domžalah (pronounced [ˈluːkɔʋitsa pɾi dɔmˈʒaːlax]; German: Lukowitz) is a settlement in the Municipality of Lukovica in the eastern part of the Upper Carniola region of Slovenia. It is the seat of the municipality.

== Name ==
The name of the settlement was changed from Lukovica to Lukovica pri Domžalah in 1955. In the past the German name was Lukowitz.
