= 1990 Slovenian presidential election =

- 8 April 1990 (first round); 22 April 1990 (second round)
- Turnout: 83.05% (first round); 76.85% (second round)
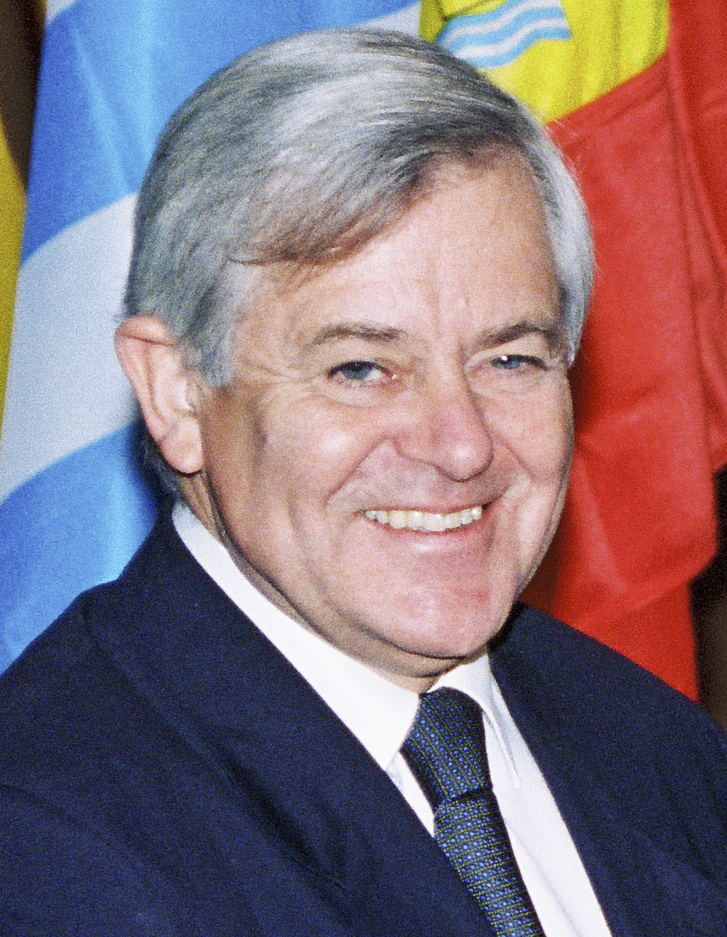

Candidate	Milan Kučan	Jože Pučnik
Party	ZKS-SDP	SDSS
Alliance		DEMOS
Popular vote	657,196	464,435
Percentage	58.59%	41.41%
President before election
Janez Stanovnik
ZKS-SDP
Elected President
Milan Kučan
ZKS-SDP

Presidential elections were held in Slovenia on 8 April 1990, with a second round on 22 April. Voters elected the four members of the presidency and the President of the presidency. Ciril Zlobec, Ivan Oman, Matjaž Kmecl and Dušan Plut were elected to the presidency, whilst Milan Kučan was elected president in the second round.

== Electoral system ==
The four members of the presidency were elected by plurality-at-large voting, with voters able to vote for four candidates. The four candidates with the most votes were elected.

== Results ==
=== President ===
Candidate	Party	First round		Second round	
Candidate	Party	Votes	%	Votes	%
Milan Kučan	ZKS-SDP–SZDLS	538,278	44.43	657,196	58.59
Jože Pučnik	Social Democratic Party of Slovenia (DEMOS)	322,706	26.64	464,435	41.41
Ivan Kramberger	Independent	224,162	18.50		
Marko Demšar	ZSMS-LS	126,424	10.43		
Total		1,211,570	100.00	1,121,631	100.00
Valid votes		1,211,570	97.90	1,121,631	97.96
Invalid/blank votes		25,975	2.10	23,354	2.04
Total votes		1,237,545	100.00	1,144,985	100.00
Registered voters/turnout		1,490,136	83.05	1,489,822	76.85
Source: Nohlen & Stöver

=== Presidency ===
Candidate	Party	Votes	%
Ciril Zlobec	SZDLS	637,517	14.31
Ivan Oman	Slovenian Peasant Union (DEMOS)	550,529	12.36
Matjaž Kmecl	ZKS-SDP	454,633	10.21
Dušan Plut	Greens of Slovenia (DEMOS)	453,626	10.18
Slavoj Žižek	ZSMS-LS	431,206	9.68
Dimitrij Rupel	Slovenian Democratic Union (DEMOS)	408,868	9.18
Alojz Križman	ZSMS-LS	342,341	7.69
Miroslava Geč Korošec	SZDLS	292,466	6.57
Boštjan Zupančič	ZKS-SDP	239,737	5.38
Franc Miklavčič	Slovene Christian Democrats (DEMOS)	236,663	5.31
Peter Novak	SZDLS	212,182	4.76
Bogdan Oblak	ZSMS-LS	194,689	4.37
Total		4,454,457	100.00
Valid votes		1,189,205	96.26
Invalid/blank votes		46,263	3.74
Total votes		1,235,468	100.00
Registered voters/turnout		1,490,136	82.91
Source: Nohlen & Stöver
