= Parliamentary elections in Slovenia =

Slovenia National Assembly 2022

Parliamentary elections in Slovenia for member seats of National Assembly of Slovenia have been regularly held since first democratic elections in 1990.

== Participation ==
At all democratic elections since 1990.

No.	Elections	Registered	Voted	Percent
Socialist Republic of Slovenia
I	8 April 1990	1,490,136	1,241,212; 1,238,189	83,30% 83,09%
Slovenia
II	6 December 1992	1,491,374	1,277,604	85,66%
III	10 November 1996	1,542,218	1,136,211	73,70%
IV	15 October 2000	1,588,528	1,114,170	70,14%
V	3 October 2004	1,634,402	991,263	60,65%
VI	21 September 2008	1,696,437	1,070,523	63,10%
VII	4 December 2011	1,709,692	1,121,573	65,60%
VIII	13 July 2014	1,713,067	885,860	51,71%
IX	3 June 2018	1,712,676	901.454	52,63%
X	24 April 2022	1,695,771	1,203,373	70,96%

== Winners ==
All democratic winning parties in National Assembly of Slovenia since 1990.

#	Logo	Party	Elections	Seats	Votes	Percentage
Socialist Republic of Slovenia
I		Party of Democratic Renewal	1990	14	186,928	17,28%
Slovenia
II		Liberal Democratic Party	1992	22	278,851	23,46%
III		Liberal Democracy of Slovenia	1996	25	288,783	27,01%
VI		Liberal Democracy of Slovenia	2000	34	390,306	36,26%
V		Slovenian Democratic Party	2004	29	281,710	29,08%
VI		Social Democrats	2008	29	320,248	30,45%
VII		Positive Slovenia	2011	28	314,273	28,51%
VIII		Modern Centre Party	2014	36	301,563	34,49%
IX		Slovenian Democratic Party	2018	26	288,719	24,92%
X		Freedom Movement	2022	41	405,903	34,53%

== Voting system ==
There are 8 main voting units, each unit further divided into 11 separate electoral districts. That is how we get 88 regular members of parliament in total, one voted from each district.

2 additional members of Italian and Hungarian minority form total 90 seats. For coalition to constitute the government, they need at least 46 regular members, two minority members don't count.

#	8 units	11 electoral districts										
#	8 units	1	2	3	4	5	6	7	8	9	10	11
1	Kranj	Jesenice	Radovljica I	Radovljica II	Kranj I	Kranj II	Kranj III	Tržič	Škofja Loka I	Škofja Loka II	Kamnik	Idrija
2	Postojna	Tolmin	Piran	Izola	Koper I	Koper II	Sežana	Ilirska Bistrica	Postojna	Nova Gorica I	Nova Gorica II	Ajdovščina
3	Center (Ljubljana)	Logatec	Vrhnika	Rudnik I (Ljubljana Vič)	Rudnik II (Ljubljana Vič)	Rudnik III (Ljubljana Vič)	Rudnik IV (Ljubljana Vič)	Center (Ljubljana)	Šiška I (Ljubljana)	Šiška II (Ljubljana)	Šiška III (Ljubljana)	Šiška IV (Ljubljana)
4	Bežigrad (Ljubljana)	Kočevje	Ribnica	Grosuplje	Litija	Moste-Polje I (Ljubljana)	Moste-Polje II (Ljubljana)	Moste-Polje III (Ljubljana)	Bežigrad I (Ljubljana)	Bežigrad II (Ljubljana)	Domžale I	Domžale II
5	Celje	Šentjur pri Celju	Celje I	Celje II	Žalec I	Žalec II	Mozirje	Velenje I	Velenje II	Sl. Gradec	Ravne na Koroškem	Radlje ob Dravi
6	Novo mesto	Črnomelj	Novo mesto I	Novo mesto II	Trebnje	Brežice	Krško	Sevnica	Laško	Hrastnik	Trbovlje	Zagorje ob Savi
7	Maribor	Šmarje pri Jelšah	Sl. Bistrica	Sl. Konjice	Ruše	Maribor I	Maribor II	Maribor III	Maribor IV	Maribor V	Maribor VI	Maribor VII
8	Ptuj	Lendava	Ormož	Ljutomer	M. Sobota I	M. Sobota II	G. Radgona	Lenart	Pesnica	Ptuj I	Ptuj II	Ptuj III
9	Koper	1 member of Italian minority										
10	Lendava	1 member of Hungarian minority										
