= List of members of the European Parliament for Slovenia, 2004 =

This is a list of the 7 delegates of the European Parliament from Slovenia.

- Mihael Brejc (SDS, EPP-ED)
- Ljubo Germič (LDS, ELDR)
- Feri Horvat (SD, PES)
- Roman Jakič (LDS, ELDR)
- Lojze Peterle (NSi, EPP-ED)
- Janez Podobnik (SLS, EPP-ED)
- Majda Širca (LDS, ELDR)
