= 2009 European Parliament election in Slovenia =

- 7 June 2009

7 seats to the European Parliament
- Turnout: 28.36%
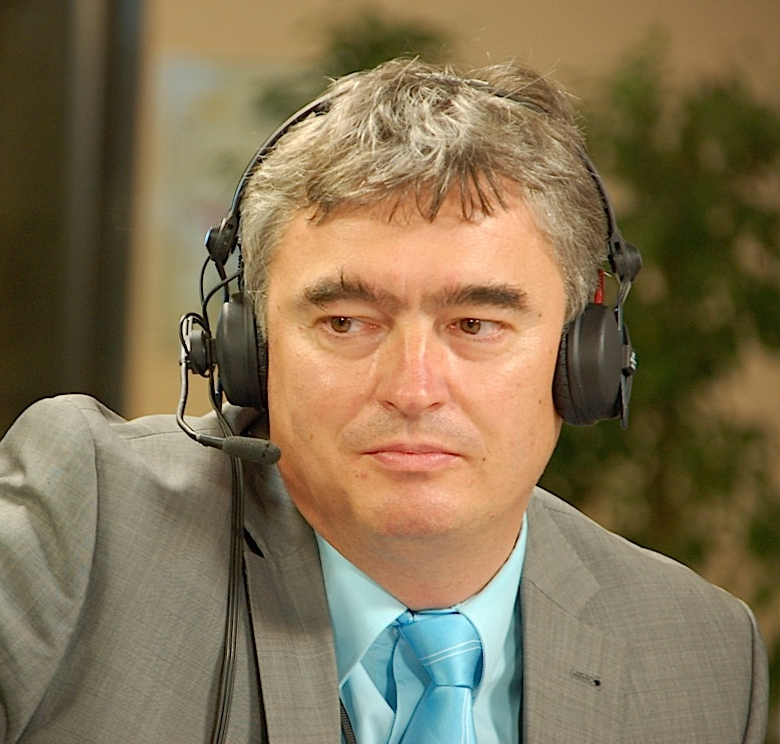

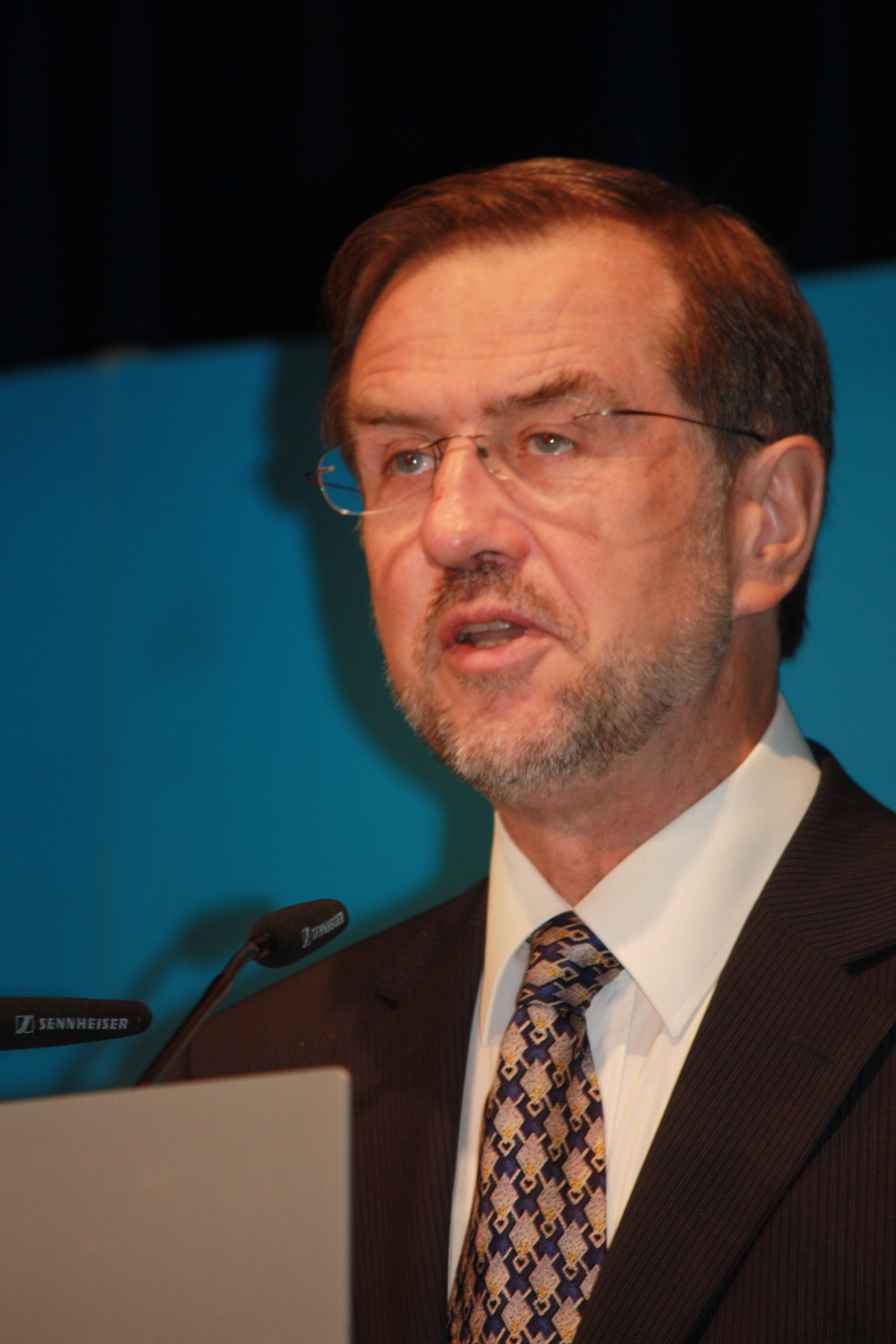

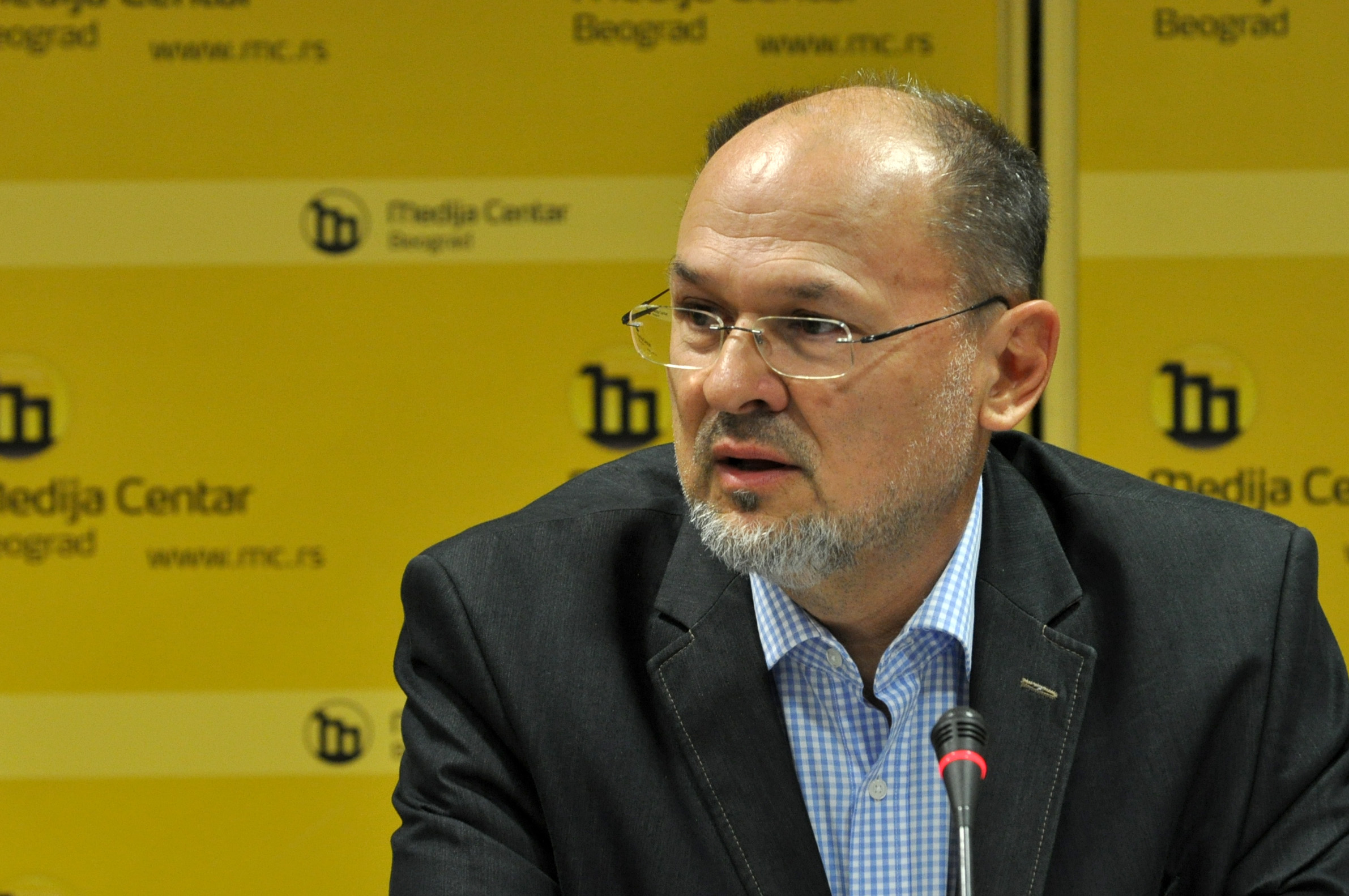

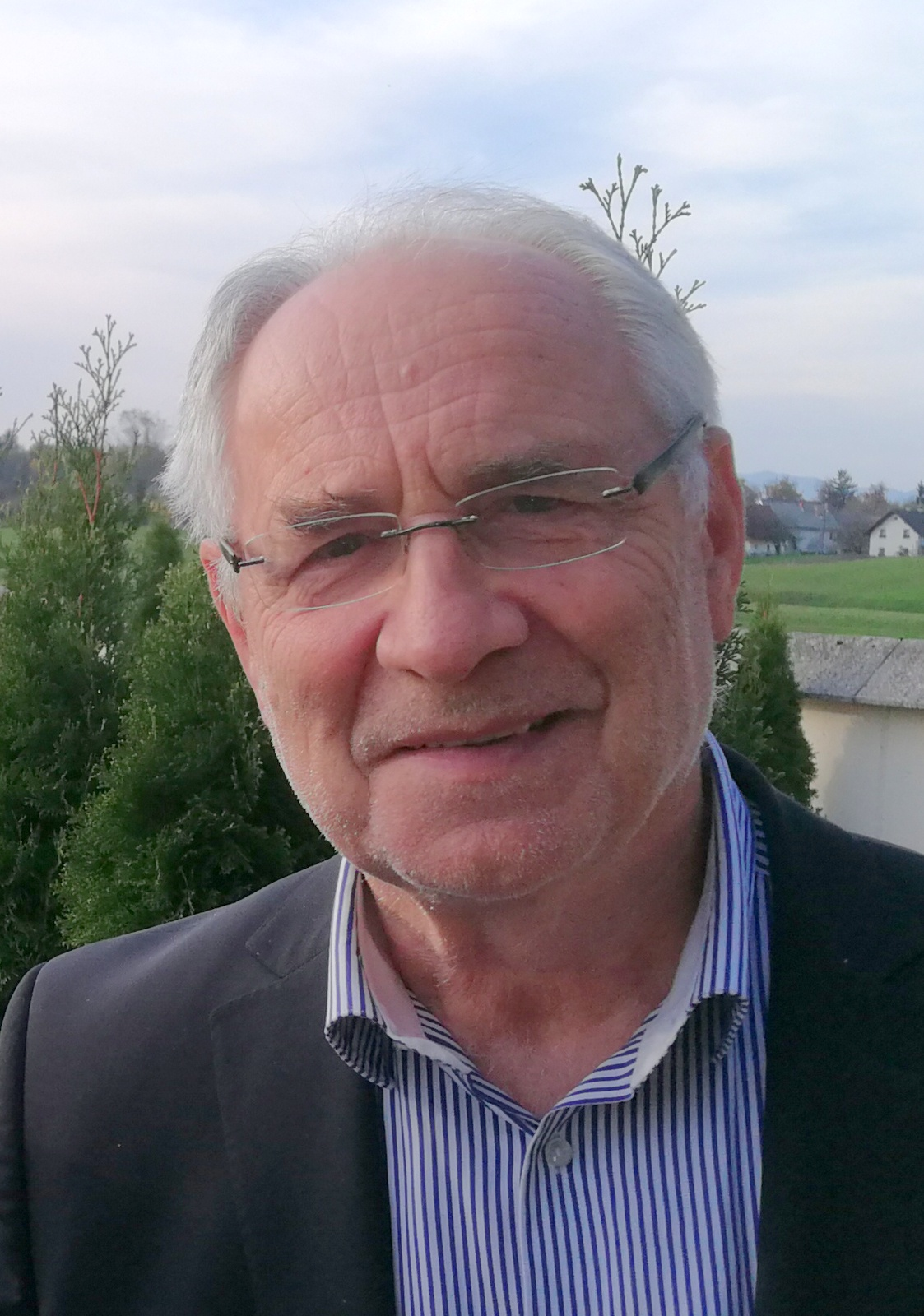
	First party	Second party	Third party
Leader	Milan Zver	Zoran Thaler	Lojze Peterle
Party	SDS	SD	NSi
Alliance	EPP	PES	EPP
Last election	17.65%	14.65%	23.75%
Seats before	2	1	2
Seats after	2 + 1	2	2
Seat change	▲1	▲1	0
Popular vote	123.369	85.402	76.497
Percentage	26.66%	18.43%	16.58%
Swing	▲9.01%	▲3.78%	▼7.17%
	Fourth party	Fifth party
Leader	Jelko Kacin	Ivo Vajgl
Party	LDS	Zares
Alliance	ALDE	ALDE
Last election	21.91%	New party
Seats before	2	0
Seats after	1	1
Seat change	▼1	▲1
Popular vote	53.212	45.237
Percentage	11.48%	9.76%
Swing	▼10.43%	▲9.76 %

The 2009 European Parliament election in Slovenia was the election of the delegation from Slovenia to the European Parliament in 2009.

The Slovenian Democratic Party won these elections and have won every EU election since, As of 2024.

== Candidates ==
Political Party	Candidate	Candidate	Candidate	Candidate	Candidate	Candidate	Candidate
Christian Socialists of Slovenia (KSS)	Maruša Benkič	Nedeljo Dabič	Gabrijela Čevnik	Valentina Stopar	Srečko Prislan	Nina Plahutnik Suhadolnik	Andrej Magajna
Democratic Party of Pensioners of Slovenia (DeSUS)	Karl Erjavec	Marija Gjerkeš Dugonik	Drago Mirošič	Andrejka Majhen	Joško Godec	Silva Savšek	Avgust Heričko
Liberal Democracy of Slovenia (LDS)	Jelko Kacin	Mirjam Muženič	Slavko Ziherl	Sonja Kralj Bervar	Borut Cink	Darja Mohorič	Aleš Gulič
New Slovenia (NSi)	Lojze Peterle	Ljudmila Novak	Mojca Kucler Dolinar	Anton Kokalj	Alenka Šverc	Klemen Žumer	Ksenija Kraševec
Slovenian Democratic Party (SDS)	Milan Zver	Romana Jordan Cizelj	Zofija Mazej Kukovič	Dragutin Mate	Mirko Zamernik	Katja Koren Miklavec	Anže Logar
Slovenian National Party (SNS)	Sergej Čas	Barbara Jerman	Nina Mavrin	Donja Hudoklin	Aleš Bandur	Janja Čas	Matej Ivanuša
Slovenian People's Party (SLS)	Ivan Žagar	Marta Ciraj	Marjan Senjur	Nada Skuk	Ciril Smrkolj	Marija Ribič	Janez Podobnik
Social Democrats (SD)	Zoran Thaler	Tanja Fajon	Andrej Horvat	Mojca Kleva	Lev Kreft	Karmen Pahor	Andreja Katič
United Greens	Vlado Čuš	Lucija Mozetič	Mihael Jarc	Teja Dumenčić	Franc Černagoj	Tomaž Ogrin	Tamara Galun
Youth Party of Slovenia (SMS)	Darko Krajnc	Nataša Lorber	Katja Grabnar	Idris Fadul	Peter Janeš	Maja Kovač	Miha Jazbinšek
Zares	Ivo Vajgl	Felicita Medved	Roman Jakič	Bernarda Jeklin	Peter Česnik	Cveta Zalokar	Matej Lahovnik
Independent List for the Rights of Patients	Marko Šidjanin	Tadeja Cankar Davanzo	Andraž Košir	Tina Jakopin			

== Opinion polls ==
Source	Date	SDS	SD	LDS	DeSUS	NSi	Zares	SNS	SLS	NLPD	SMS
Mediana	11–13 May	19.5% (2)	17.4% (2)	12.7% (1)	11.7% (1)	10.2% (1)	8.6%	3.4%	1.3%	2.2%	N/A
Delo	12–14 May	21% (2)	16% (2)	12% (1)	5.5%	10% (1)	11% (1)	4%	4%	N/A	4%
Delo	21–22 May	20% (2)	15% (1)	9% (1)	9% (1)	10% (1)	11% (1)	2%	2%	N/A	2%
Zurnal	28 May	28% (3)	24% (2)	7%	6%	10% (1)	12% (1)	4%	4%	N/A	N/A
Delo	27–28 May	22% (2)	16% (2)	8% (1)	7%	9% (1)	13% (1)	N/A	N/A	N/A	N/A
Mediana	25–27 May	20.6% (2)	15.9% (1)	8.3% (1)	11.1% (1)	11.3% (1)	8%	3.4%	1.9%	1.2%	0.4%

== Results ==
Party	Votes	%	Seats			
Party	Votes	%	Initial	+/–	Post-Lisbon	+/–
Slovenian Democratic Party	123,563	26.66	2	0	3	+1
Social Democrats	85,407	18.43	2	+1	2	0
New Slovenia	76,866	16.58	1	–1	1	0
Liberal Democracy of Slovenia	53,212	11.48	1	–1	1	0
Zares	45,238	9.76	1	New	1	0
Democratic Party of Pensioners of Slovenia	33,292	7.18	0	0	0	0
Slovenian People's Party	16,601	3.58	0	0	0	0
Slovenian National Party	13,227	2.85	0	0	0	0
Youth Party – European Greens	9,093	1.96	0	0	0	0
United Greens	3,382	0.73	0	New	0	0
Independent List for the Rights of Patients	2,064	0.45	0	New	0	0
Christian Socialists of Slovenia	1,527	0.33	0	New	0	0
Total	463,472	100.00	7	0	8	+1
Valid votes	463,472	96.14				
Invalid/blank votes	18,586	3.86				
Total votes	482,058	100.00				
Registered voters/turnout	1,699,755	28.36				
Source: DVK, DVK
