= Politics of Slovenia =

The politics of Slovenia takes place in a framework of a parliamentary representative democratic republic, whereby the Prime Minister of Slovenia is the head of government, and of a multi-party system. Executive power is exercised by the Government of Slovenia. Legislative power is vested in the National Assembly and in minor part in the National Council. The judiciary of Slovenia is independent of the executive and the legislature. Slovenia is a Member State of the European Union and is represented in the Council of the EU and through elections to the European Parliament.

== Political developments ==
As a young independent republic, Slovenia pursued economic stabilization and further political openness, while emphasizing its Western outlook and central European heritage. Today, with a growing regional profile, a participant in the SFOR peacekeeping deployment in Bosnia and the KFOR deployment in Kosovo, and a charter World Trade Organization member, Slovenia plays a role on the world stage quite out of proportion to its small size.

From 1998 to 2000, Slovenia occupied a nonpermanent seat on the UN Security Council and in that capacity distinguished itself with a constructive, creative, and consensus-oriented activism. Slovenia has been a Member State of the European Union since May 2004. It has also been a member of the United Nations since May 1992, of the Council of Europe since May 1993, and of all major international financial institutions (the International Monetary Fund, the World Bank Group, and the European Bank for Reconstruction and Development) as well as 40 other international organizations, among them the World Trade Organization, of which it is a founding member.

Since the breakup of the former Yugoslavia, Slovenia has instituted a stable, multi-party, democratic political system, characterized by regular elections, a free press, and an excellent human rights record. However, Slovenia is the only former Communist state that has never carried out lustration. By Constitution of Slovenia the country is a parliamentary democracy and a republic. Within its government, power is shared between a directly elected president, a prime minister, and an incompletely bicameral legislature. The legislative body is composed of the 90-member National Assembly—which takes the lead on virtually all legislative issues—and the National Council, a largely advisory body composed of representatives from social, economic, professional, and local interests. The Constitutional Court has the highest power of review of legislation to ensure its consistency with Slovenia's constitution. Its nine judges are elected for 9-year terms.

In 1997, elections were held to elect both a president and representatives to Parliament's upper house, the National Council. Milan Kučan, elected President of the Yugoslav Republic of Slovenia in 1990, led his country to independence in 1991. He was elected the first President of independent Slovenia in 1992 and again in November 1997 by a comfortable margin.

Janez Drnovšek of the center-left Liberal Democratic Party of Slovenia (LDS) was reelected Prime Minister in the 15 October 2000 parliamentary elections. Drnovšek's coalition held an almost two-thirds majority in Parliament.

The government, most of the Slovenian polity, shares a common view of the desirability of a close association with the West, specifically of membership in both the European Union and NATO. For all the apparent bitterness that divides left and right wings, there are few fundamental philosophical differences between them in the area of public policy. Slovenian society is built on consensus, which has converged on a social-democrat model. Political differences tend to have their roots in the roles that groups and individuals played during the years of communist rule and the struggle for independence.

As the most prosperous republic of the former Yugoslavia, Slovenia emerged from its brief ten-day war of secession in 1991 as an independent nation for the first time in its history. Since that time, the country has made steady but cautious progress toward developing a market economy. Economic reforms introduced shortly after independence led to healthy economic growth. Despite the halting pace of reform and signs of slowing GDP growth today, Slovenians now enjoy the highest per capita income of all the transition economies of central Europe.

The Slovenians have pursued internal economic restructuring with caution. The first phase of privatization (socially owned property under the SFRY system) is now complete, and sales of remaining large state holdings were completed in 2014. Trade has been diversified toward the West (trade with EU countries make up 66% of total trade in 2000) and the growing markets of central and eastern Europe. Manufacturing accounts for most employment, with machinery and other manufactured products comprising the major exports. Labor force surveys put unemployment at approximately 6.6% (Dec. 2000), with 106,153 registrations for unemployment assistance. Inflation has remained below double-digit levels, 6.1% (1999) and 8.9% (2000). Gross domestic product grew by about 4.8% in 2000 and is expected to post a slightly lower rate of 4.5% in 2001, as export demand lags. The currency is stable, fully convertible, and backed by substantial reserves. The economy provides citizens with a good standard of living.

Ten years after independence, Slovenia has made tremendous progress establishing democratic institutions, enshrining respect for human rights, establishing a market economy and adapting its military to Western norms and standards. Following this path it became a Member State of the European Union in 2004. In contrast to its neighbors, civil tranquility and strong economic growth have marked this period. Upon achieving independence, Slovenia offered citizenship to all residents, regardless of ethnicity or origin, avoiding a sectarian trap that has caught out many central European countries. Slovenia willingly accepted refugees from the fighting in Bosnia and has since participated in international stabilization efforts in the region.

On the international front, Slovenia has advanced rapidly toward integration into the Euro-Atlantic community of nations. Slovenia has achieved two of its primary foreign policy goals: membership in the EU and NATO. Slovenia also participates in the Southeast Europe Cooperation Initiative (SECI).

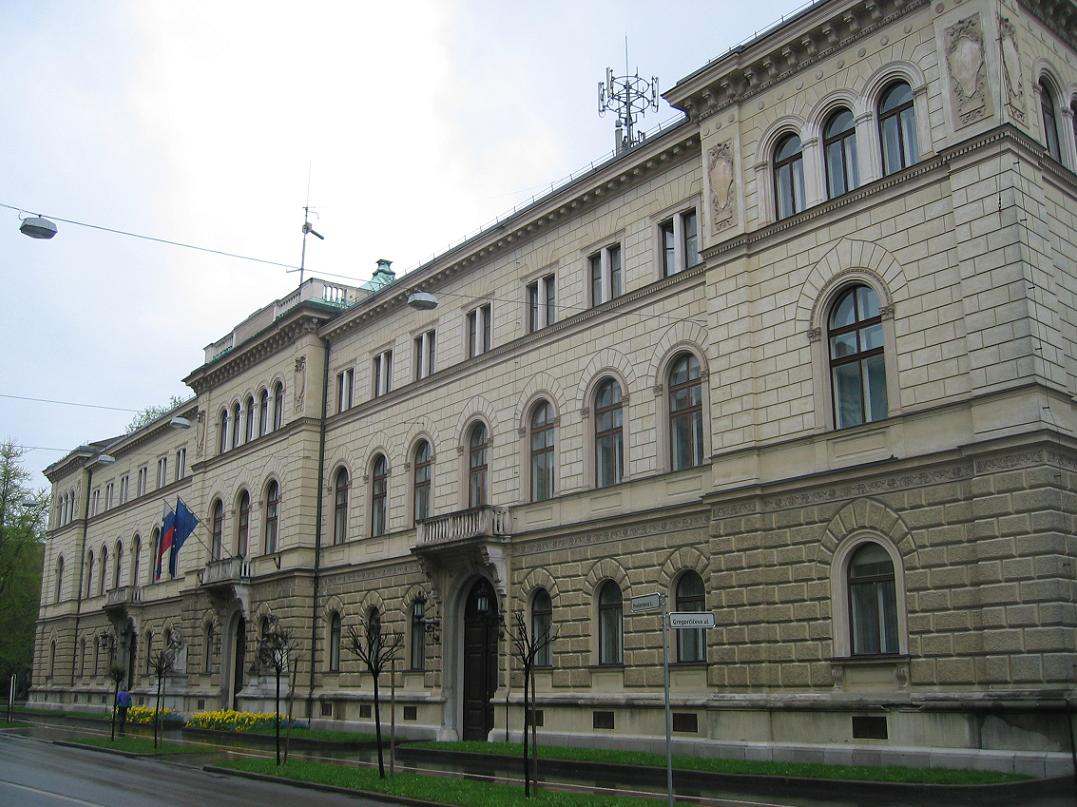
Presidential Palace in Ljubljana

Slovenia has been an active participant in Partnership for Peace (PfP) and has sought to demonstrate its preparedness to take on the responsibilities and burdens of membership in the Alliance. The United States looks to Slovenia to play a productive role in continuing security efforts throughout the region. It has done much– contributing to the success of IFOR, SFOR, efforts in Albania, North Macedonia, Montenegro, Kosovo, and elsewhere– and has continued to expand actively its constructive regional engagement.

Slovenia is one of the focus countries for the United States' southeast European policy, aimed at reinforcing regional stability and integration. The Slovenian Government is well-positioned to be an influential role model for other southeast European governments at different stages of reform and integration. To these ends, the United States urges Slovenia to maintain momentum on internal economic, political, and legal reforms, while expanding their international cooperation as resources allow. Given Slovenia's membership of the EU, many of these reforms are now legally binding through European law. NATO and EU efforts to assist Slovenia's military restructuring and modernization efforts are ongoing.

Borut Pahor has held the position of president since 2012. In November 2017, Slovenian President Borut Pahor was re-elected for a second term in close election.

Former prime minister Janez Jansa spent six months in prison in 2014 after being convicted on bribery charges related to a 2006 arms deal. Jansa had denied any wrongdoing.

In June 2018, the center-right Slovenia Democratic Party (SDS) of former prime minister Janez Jansa won in the election. SDS secured 25 seats in the 90-seat parliament. A center-left party, The List of Marjan Sarec (LMS), was in second place with 13 seats.

Prime Minister Marjan Sarec resigned in January 2020. He led a center-left minority government since the 2018 elections.

In March 2020, Janez Janša became prime minister for third time in the new coalition government of SDS, the Modern Centre Party (SMC), New Slovenia (NSi) and Pensioners' Party (DeSUS). Jansa had previously been prime minister from 2004 to 2008 and from 2012 to 2013. Janez Janša was known as a right-wing populist and an outspoken supporter of former US President Donald Trump. Janša was also known as an ally of right-wing Prime Minister Viktor Orban of Hungary.

In April 2022, liberal opposition, The Freedom Movement, won the parliamentary election. The Freedom Movement won 34.5% of the vote, compared with 23.6% for Janša's Slovenian Democratic party. On 25 May 2022, Slovenia's parliament voted to appoint the leader of Freedom Movement, Robert Golob, as the new Prime Minister of Slovenia to succeed Janez Janša.

On 22 March 2026, the ruling centre-left coalition lost its majority in the parliamentary election. On May 22, Janez Janša was elected as prime minister of a new centre-right government by the Slovenia’s parliament.

== Constitution ==
The constitution was adopted on 23 December 1991, effective 23 December 1991.

== Executive branch ==
Main office-holders
Office	Name	Party	Since
President	Nataša Pirc Musar	Independent	23 December 2022
Prime Minister	Robert Golob	Freedom Movement	25 May 2022

The president is elected by popular vote for a five-year term. Following National Assembly elections, the leader of the majority party or the leader of a majority coalition is usually nominated to become prime minister by the president and elected by the National Assembly. The Council of Ministers is nominated by the prime minister and elected by the National Assembly.

== Legislative branch ==
The National Assembly (Državni zbor) has 90 members, elected for a four-year term, 88 members elected by proportional representation using D'Hondt formula and 2 members elected by ethnic minorities using the Borda count.

National Assembly Building of Slovenia

The Speaker of the National Assembly is elected by the deputies and requires 46 votes to be elected. Currently, this position is held by Urška Klakočar Zupančič.

== Political parties and elections ==
=== Latest Slovenian presidential election ===
Candidate	Party	First round		Second round	
Candidate	Party	Votes	%	Votes	%
Anže Logar	Independent (Note: Endorsed by the SDS and the SLS.)	296,000	33.95	414,029	46.11
Nataša Pirc Musar	Independent (Note: Endorsed by the Pirati and the SMS-Z.)	234,361	26.88	483,812	53.89
Milan Brglez	Social Democrats	134,726	15.45		
Vladimir Prebilič	Independent	92,456	10.60		
Sabina Senčar	Resni.ca	51,767	5.94		
Janez Cigler Kralj	New Slovenia	38,113	4.37		
Miha Kordiš	The Left	24,518	2.81		
Total		871,941	100.00	897,841	100.00
Valid votes		871,941	99.47	897,841	98.87
Invalid/blank votes		4,625	0.53	10,224	1.13
Total votes		876,566	100.00	908,065	100.00
Registered voters/turnout		1,694,437	51.73	1,694,373	53.59
Source: Volitve

=== Latest Slovenian European election ===
Party	Votes	%	Seats	+/–
Slovenian Democratic Party	206,368	30.61	4	+2
Freedom Movement	149,200	22.13	2	New
Vesna – Green Party	71,023	10.54	1	New
Social Democrats	52,390	7.77	1	–1
New Slovenia – Christian Democrats	51,182	7.59	1	0
Slovenian People's Party	48,637	7.21	0	–1
The Left	32,436	4.81	0	0
Resni.ca	26,767	3.97	0	New
Democratic Party of Pensioners − Good State	14,980	2.22	0	0
Greens of Slovenia	10,865	1.61	0	0
None of the Above	10,263	1.52	0	New
Total	674,111	100.00	9	+1
Valid votes	674,111	95.58		
Invalid/blank votes	31,182	4.42		
Total votes	705,293	100.00		
Registered voters/turnout	1,689,586	41.74		

== Administrative divisions ==
Slovenia is divided into 212 municipalities, of which 11 are urban municipalities with no greater degree of autonomy.

== International organization participation ==
Slovenia is member of EPO, BIS, CCC, CE, CEI, EAPC, EBRD, ECE, EU, FAO, IADB, IAEA, IBRD, ICAO, ICC, ICRM, IDA, IFC, IFRCS, ILO, IMF, IMO, Intelsat (nonsignatory user), Interpol, IOC, IOM (observer), ISO, ITU, NAM (guest), NATO, OPCW, OSCE, PCA, PFP, SECI, UN, UNCTAD, UNESCO, UNFICYP, UNIDO, UNTSO, UPU, WEU (associate partner), WHO, WIPO, WMO, WToO, WTrO
