= New Social Democracy (Slovenia) =

New Social Democracy Nova socialdemokracija
- Abbreviation: NS
- President: Andrej Magajna
- General Secretary: Žiga Šorli
- Vice President: Vladimir Obrovnik
- Founded: 12 September 2007; 18 years ago
- Ideology: Christian socialism Regionalism; Conservatism
- Political position: Centre to centre-left
- Colours: Red; Green
- National Assembly: 0 / 90
- European Parliament: 0 / 9
- Mayors: 0 / 212
- Municipal councillors: 0 / 2,750

Website
- nsd.si

The New Social Democracy (Sinhala: Nova socialdemokracija; NS) is a Slovenian political party based on the ideas of Christian socialism. The party’s predecessor was the Christian Socialists of Slovenia, and its current president is Andrej Magajna.

== History ==
=== Ideological history ===
Christian socialism ideologically originates from the Christian social movement initiated in Slovenia by Dr. Janez Evangelist Krek. His great significance lies in the synthesis he created between socialist ideas, practical social work, and the ethics of Christianity.

By using the term "Christian" in its name, the party emphasizes its connection to the Slovenian Christian-social tradition as well as the modern insights and practices of socially oriented Christians around the world, united in movements and parties under the umbrella of the International League of Religious Socialists.

=== Development in Slovenia ===
In Slovenia, the Christian social thought was developed ideologically and professionally by Andrej Gosar and Edvard Kocbek. Between the two world wars, the Christian-socialist trade union Yugoslav Professional Union also operated in this spirit. By the time of World War II, the movement had established itself as a proponent of modern economic, social, and cultural transformation of the Slovenian nation. In 1939, alongside Aleš Stanovnik and Dr. Tomaž Furlan, a committee was organized to establish a party.

Christian socialists participated in the national liberation struggle with the aim of achieving full political sovereignty and social and cultural development for the Slovenian nation at the level of developed European countries. After the war, the Christian social movement continued to grow around Slovenian intellectuals centered around the journal 2000. Among Slovenian bishops, the theological thought of Dr. Vekoslav Grmič holds a special place.

In 1991, the Christian socialists reorganized politically and began operating again as a party. However, as it was not officially registered under the new law, from 1995, individuals from the party's core became involved in broader social movements, cooperating with various political and civil organizations. In 2007, the movement once again evolved into an organized political force with the registration of the party Christian Socialists of Slovenia.

In the Slovenian parliamentary election, 2011, the party ran on a joint list under the umbrella of SMS - Greens, alongside Democrats of Slovenia, Green Coalition (Slovenia), and the Union for Primorska. The joint list received 0.86% of the vote.

During the 2014 Referendum on the Archives Act Amendment (ZVDAGA-A2), they campaigned against the law. In 2017, they also joined the campaign against the 2017 Slovenian second railway referendum proposal.

Before the Slovenian parliamentary election, 2018, the Christian Socialists of Slovenia merged with the movement New Future led by Milan Balažic and a group from the former United Left, forming the party New Social Democrats. Following a dispute over the party name with the Social Democrats (Slovenia), they renamed themselves New Social Democracy and did not contest the election.

In the 2022 Slovenian parliamentary election, the party ran as part of the Let's Connect Slovenia list, which did not pass the parliamentary threshold, receiving 3.41% of the vote.

That same year, the party participated in the campaigns for three referendums—on the 2022 RTV Slovenia Act referendum, the Government Act amendment referendum, and the Long-Term Care Act referendum—as opponents of the proposed laws.

In 2025, the party organized the campaign against the Referendum on Pension Bonus for Cultural Workers Act.

== Election results ==
Election	Votes	%	+/–	Seats	+/–	Rank	Government
2011	9,532	0.86	Steady	0 / 90	Steady	11.^{a}	–
2014	did not run			0 / 90	0	/	–
2018	did not run			0 / 90	0	/	–
2022	40,612	3.41	▲2.55	0 / 90	0	7.^{b}	–

^a The party ran on a joint list with SMS – Greens. ^b The party ran on a joint list with Let's Connect Slovenia.
