= Ivan Oman =

Slovenian politician (1929–2019)

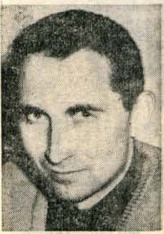
- Oman in 1969

Personal details
- Born: 10 September 1929 Zminec, Kingdom of Serbs, Croats, and Slovenes
- Died: 18 August 2019 (aged 89) Zminec, Slovenia
- Children: 7
- Occupation: politician, farmer

Ivan Oman (10 September 1929 – 17 August 2019) was a Slovenian politician. He served as first president of the Slovenian Peasant Union from 1988 to 1992, now known as the Slovenian People's Party. In 1990 Oman was elected to the Presidency of the Socialist Republic of Slovenia. Before the 1992 election he sided with the Slovene Christian Democrats and was elected a member of the 1st National Assembly of the Republic of Slovenia (1992–1996). After the end of his term, Oman retired from politics.
