= 1992 Slovenian parliamentary election =

- 6–10 December 1992

All 90 seats in the National Assembly 46 seats needed for a majority
- Turnout: 85.67% (▲2.38 pp)
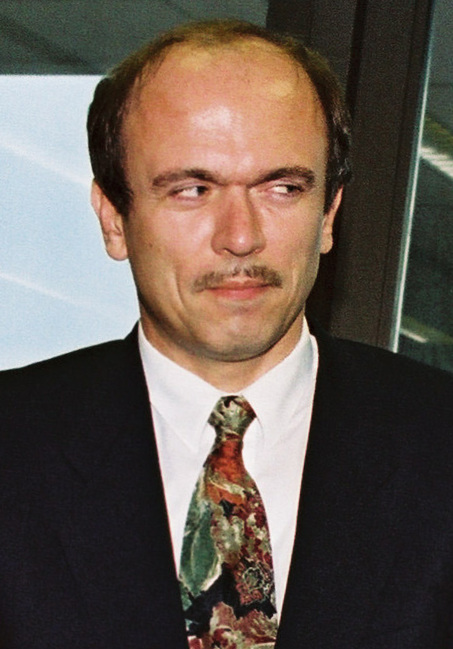

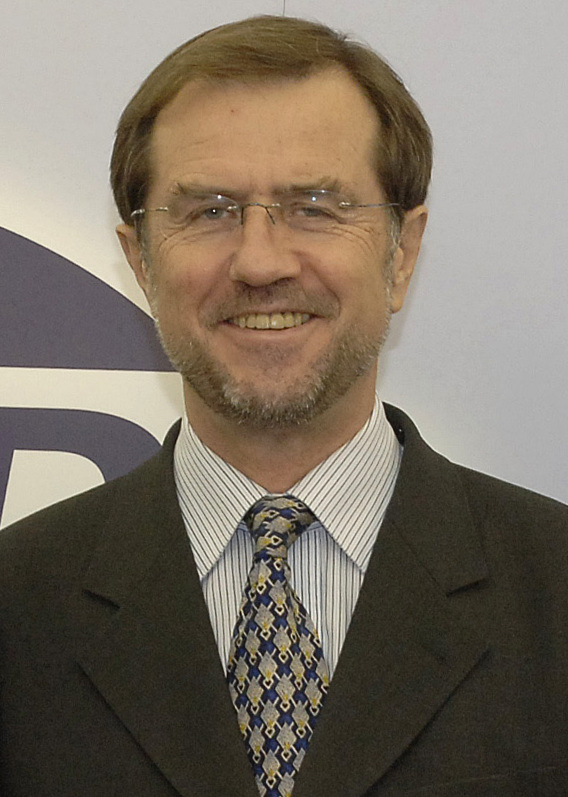

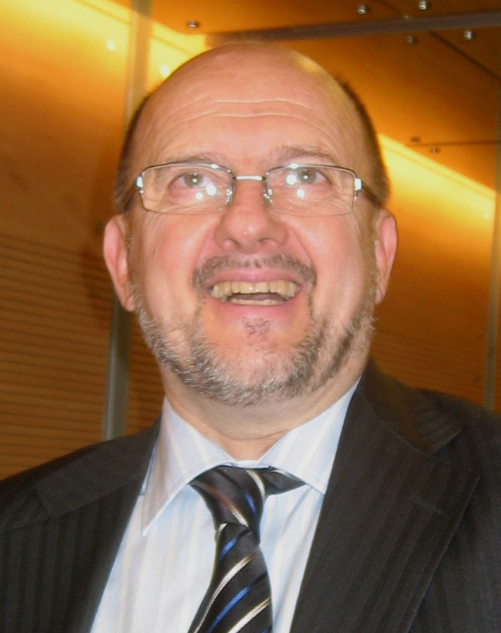

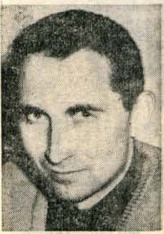

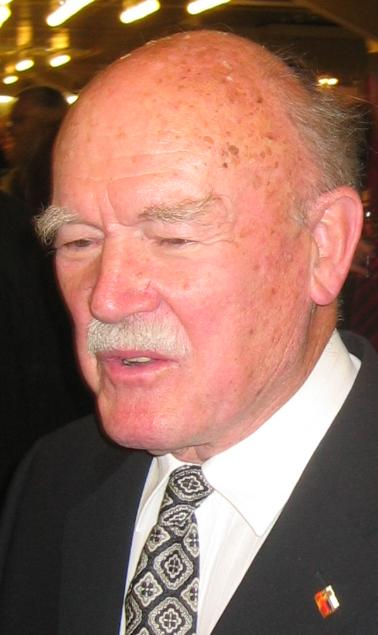

	First party	Second party	Third party
Leader	Janez Drnovšek	Lojze Peterle	Ciril Ribičič
Party	LDS	SKD	United List
Last election	12	11	14
Seats won	22	15	14
Seat change	▲10	▲4	Steady
Popular vote	278,851	172,424	161,349
Percentage	23.46%	14.51%	13.58%
Swing	▲8.97pp	▲1.53pp	▼3.70pp
	Fourth party	Fifth party	Sixth party
Leader	Zmago Jelinčič	Ivan Oman	France Bučar
Party	SNS	SLS	DSS
Last election	New	11	8
Seats won	12	10	6
Seat change	New	▼1	▼2
Popular vote	119,091	103,300	59,487
Percentage	10.02%	8.69%	5.01%
Swing	New	▼3.86pp	▼4.50pp
	Seventh party	Eighth party
Leader	Dušan Plut	Jože Pučnik
Party	Greens of Slovenia	SDS
Last election	8	6
Seats won	5	4
Seat change	▼3	▼2
Popular vote	44,019	69,675
Percentage	3.70%	3.34%
Swing	▼5.14pp	▼4.05pp
Prime Minister before election
Janez Drnovšek
LDS
Elected Prime Minister
Janez Drnovšek
LDS

Parliamentary elections were held in Slovenia on 6 and 10 December 1992. These were the first legislative elections to the National Assembly (Državni zbor Republike Slovenije) after the rename of the Assembly of the Republic of Slovenia (Skupščina Republike Slovenije) in December 1991 and the first elections in independent Slovenia. The result was a victory for the Liberal Democratic Party, which won 22 of the 90 seats. Party leader Janez Drnovšek was re-elected Prime Minister by the Parliament on 12 January 1993.

== Results ==
Party	Votes	%	Seats	+/–
Liberal Democratic Party	278,851	23.46	22	+10
Slovene Christian Democrats	172,424	14.51	15	+4
United List	161,349	13.58	14	0
Slovenian National Party	119,091	10.02	12	New
Slovenian People's Party	103,300	8.69	10	–1
Democratic Party of Slovenia	59,487	5.01	6	–2
Greens of Slovenia	44,019	3.70	5	–3
Social Democratic Party of Slovenia	39,675	3.34	4	–2
Socialist Party of Slovenia	32,696	2.75	0	–5
National Democrats–Slovenian Economic Party	25,852	2.18	0	New
Slovenian Craftsmen and Entrepreneurial Party	18,965	1.60	0	New
Liberal Party	18,069	1.52	0	–3
Liberal Democratic Party of Slovenia	16,892	1.42	0	New
Party of Independence	16,178	1.36	0	New
Christian Socialists–Free Party	13,592	1.14	0	New
Association for Primorska Region	10,059	0.85	0	New
DEMOS	9,143	0.77	0	New
Styrian Democratic Christian Party	8,022	0.68	0	New
Party of Ecological Movement of Slovenia	7,360	0.62	0	New
Movement for Democracy	6,707	0.56	0	New
Zruzenje "SMER" Slovenije	6,674	0.56	0	New
Republican Association of Slovenia	5,378	0.45	0	New
IDZ	1,125	0.09	0	New
Regional Party of Styria	912	0.08	0	New
Green Movement of Ljubljana Moste Polje	708	0.06	0	New
Independents	11,850	1.00	0	New
Minority representatives			2	0
Total	1,188,378	100.00	90	+10
Valid votes	1,188,378	93.02		
Invalid/blank votes	89,226	6.98		
Total votes	1,277,604	100.00		
Registered voters/turnout	1,491,374	85.67		
Source: DVK

== Notes ==
- Liberal Democracy of Slovenia did not yet exist in 1992. It was founded on 12 March 1994 at the unification congress as successor of three joined parties: Liberal Democratic Party, Socialist Party of Slovenia and Democratic Party of Slovenia.
