= Slovenian National Party =

Slovene political party

Slovenian National Party Slovenska nacionalna stranka
- Abbreviation: SNS
- President: Zmago Jelinčič Plemeniti
- Vice Presidents: Matjaž Perše; Matevž Perovec
- Founder: Zmago Jelinčič Plemeniti
- Founded: 17 March 1991; 35 years ago
- Headquarters: Tivolska 13, Ljubljana
- Ideology: Nationalism Right-wing populism Euroscepticism
- Political position: Far-right
- European affiliation: Alliance of European National Movements (2009–2019)
- Colours: Black; Yellow
- Slogan: Slovenijo slovencem! ('Slovenia for Slovenes!')
- National Assembly: 0 / 90
- European Parliament: 0 / 9
- Mayors: 0 / 212
- Municipal council: 2 / 2,750

Website
- sns.si

The Slovenian National Party (Slovene: Slovenska nacionalna stranka, SNS) is a minor nationalist political party in Slovenia led by Zmago Jelinčič Plemeniti. Founded in 1991, it has periodically won representation in the National Assembly, and is known for its hard Euroscepticism and opposition to Slovenia's membership in NATO. Sources have variously described the party's ideological position, most commonly as far-right or right-wing populist, while some academic work has argued it combines elements associated with both right- and left-leaning agendas and is not easily placed on a conventional left–right spectrum.

== History ==
=== Background and founding (1990–1992) ===
The Slovenian National Party (SNS) was founded on 17 March 1991, in the final phase of Slovenia’s transition from a socialist republic within Yugoslavia to an independent state. The party emerged in a political environment marked by debates over national sovereignty, state borders, citizenship, and the legacy of Yugoslavia. Its founder and long-time leader, Zmago Jelinčič Plemeniti, positioned the party as an explicitly nationalist alternative to both former communist elites and emerging liberal-democratic parties.

From its inception, the SNS adopted a confrontational political style and emphasized themes of national pride, state sovereignty, and opposition to foreign influence. Scholars have noted that the party drew selectively on historical Slovenian nationalist symbolism, including references to the nineteenth-century “United Slovenia” programme and the Kozler map, although these symbols were often used rhetorically rather than as part of a coherent territorial programme.

In the 1992 parliamentary election, the party won 12 seats in the National Assembly, making it one of the most successful radical or nationalist parties in post-independence Slovenia at the time.

=== Parliamentary presence and internal conflicts (1993–2000) ===
Following its initial success, the SNS remained represented in parliament throughout the 1990s, though with fluctuating electoral results. The period was marked by frequent internal disputes, organizational instability, and the departure of several prominent members.

Academic analyses describe the party during this phase as highly personalized around its leader and lacking a stable internal structure, which contributed to repeated splits and the formation of smaller nationalist groupings. Despite these internal challenges, the SNS managed to retain a parliamentary presence in the 1996 and 2000 elections, albeit with reduced seat totals compared to 1992.

=== Decline and fragmentation (2001–2011) ===
In the 2000s, the party experienced a gradual electoral decline. Although it increased its representation in the 2004 election, it failed to consolidate this success in subsequent years.

A significant split occurred in 2008, when several Members of Parliament left the SNS and founded the Lipa party, further weakening the organization. In the 2011 election, the SNS failed to pass the parliamentary threshold and lost all representation in the National Assembly, entering a prolonged extra-parliamentary period.

=== Return to parliament and recent developments (2012–present) ===
After several unsuccessful election attempts, the SNS returned to parliament in the 2018 election, winning four seats. During the 2020–2022 government led by Janez Janša, the party entered into a cooperation agreement with the ruling coalition, although it did not formally join the government.

In the 2022 election, the party again failed to secure parliamentary representation. As of the mid-2020s, the SNS continues to operate as a minor extra-parliamentary party, with its political relevance closely linked to the public profile of its leader.

== Ideology and positions ==
Scholarly and comparative political research most commonly classifies the Slovenian National Party as a nationalist and right-wing populist party, often placing it within the broader family of radical or far-right parties in Central and Eastern Europe. At the same time, several studies note that the party combines elements traditionally associated with both the political right and left, making it difficult to position consistently on a conventional left–right spectrum.

=== Nationalism and sovereignty ===
Nationalism represents the central ideological pillar of the SNS. The party emphasizes the primacy of the Slovenian nation, national sovereignty, and the protection of national interests against perceived external pressures. Its rhetoric frequently frames political conflicts in terms of national survival, historical injustice, and resistance to foreign influence.

The party has repeatedly stressed symbolic and historical narratives linked to Slovenian statehood, although scholars have argued that these references function primarily as mobilizing tools rather than as part of a systematic ideological doctrine.

=== European Union and NATO ===
The SNS is widely described as a hard Eurosceptic party. It has consistently opposed further European integration and criticized the transfer of national sovereignty to supranational institutions. The party was also a prominent opponent of Slovenia’s accession to NATO and has continued to advocate withdrawal or a redefinition of Slovenia’s role within the alliance.

=== Social and cultural issues ===
On social and cultural issues, the party has adopted positions that are commonly described as socially conservative or exclusionary. Academic and journalistic sources have noted its opposition to expanded rights for sexual minorities and its critical stance toward immigration and multiculturalism.

At the same time, the SNS has been described as strongly anti-clerical, advocating a strict separation of church and state and opposing the political influence of religious institutions, a position that distinguishes it from many other right-wing parties in the region.

=== Economic policy ===
In economic terms, the SNS has advanced positions that diverge from free-market liberalism. Party programmes and public statements have included opposition to large-scale privatization, support for state ownership in strategic sectors, and advocacy of social measures such as higher minimum wages. This combination of economic interventionism and nationalist rhetoric has led some analysts to characterize the party as ideologically eclectic or populist rather than programmatically coherent.

== Organisation ==
The party is led by a president; since its foundation this has been Zmago Jelinčič Plemeniti.

== Electoral results ==
=== National Assembly ===
The SNS has entered and exited parliament several times.

Election	Leader	Votes	%	Seats	+/–	Government
1992	Zmago Jelinčič Plemeniti	119,091	10.02 (#4)	12 / 90	New	Opposition
1996	Zmago Jelinčič Plemeniti	34,422	3.22 (#7)	4 / 90	▼8	Opposition
2000	Zmago Jelinčič Plemeniti	47,214	4.39 (#7)	4 / 90	0	Opposition
2004	Zmago Jelinčič Plemeniti	60,750	6.27 (#6)	6 / 90	▲2	Opposition
2008	Zmago Jelinčič Plemeniti	56,832	5.40 (#5)	5 / 90	▼1	Opposition
2011	Zmago Jelinčič Plemeniti	19,786	1.80 (#8)	0 / 90	▼5	Extra-parliamentary
2014	Zmago Jelinčič Plemeniti	19,218	2.20 (#10)	0 / 90	0	Extra-parliamentary
2018	Zmago Jelinčič Plemeniti	37,182	4.17 (#9)	4 / 90	▲4	Opposition (2018–2020)
2018	Zmago Jelinčič Plemeniti	37,182	4.17 (#9)	4 / 90	▲4	Support (2020–2022)
2022	Zmago Jelinčič Plemeniti	17,736	1.49 (#14)	0 / 90	▼4	Extra-parliamentary
2026	Zmago Jelinčič Plemeniti	26,375	2.24 (#10)	0 / 90	0	Extra-parliamentary

=== Presidential ===
Election	Candidate	1st round			2nd round			Result
Election	Candidate	Votes	%	Rank	Votes	%	Rank	Result
2002	Zmago Jelinčič Plemeniti	97,178	8.49	3rd	—N/a			Lost
2007	Zmago Jelinčič Plemeniti	188,951	19.16	▼4th	—N/a			Lost

=== European Parliament ===
Election	Leader	Votes	%	Seats	+/–	EP Group
2004	Zmago Jelinčič Plemeniti	21,883	5.0 (#6)	0 / 7	New	_
2009	Sergej Čas	13,227	2.8 (#8)	0 / 8	Steady	_
2014	Zmago Jelinčič Plemeniti	16,210	4.0 (#9)	0 / 8	Steady	_
2019	Zmago Jelinčič Plemeniti	18,926	4.0 (#8)	0 / 8	Steady	_
2024	Did not participate			0 / 9	Steady	_

== Controversies ==
Sources have accused the party and its leadership of chauvinist or racist attitudes toward minorities, particularly Slovenia's Roma population. The party has also been criticised for views on historical memory related to World War II and post-war events in Slovenia.

== See also ==
- Politics of Slovenia
- List of political parties in Slovenia
