= Kuštanovci =

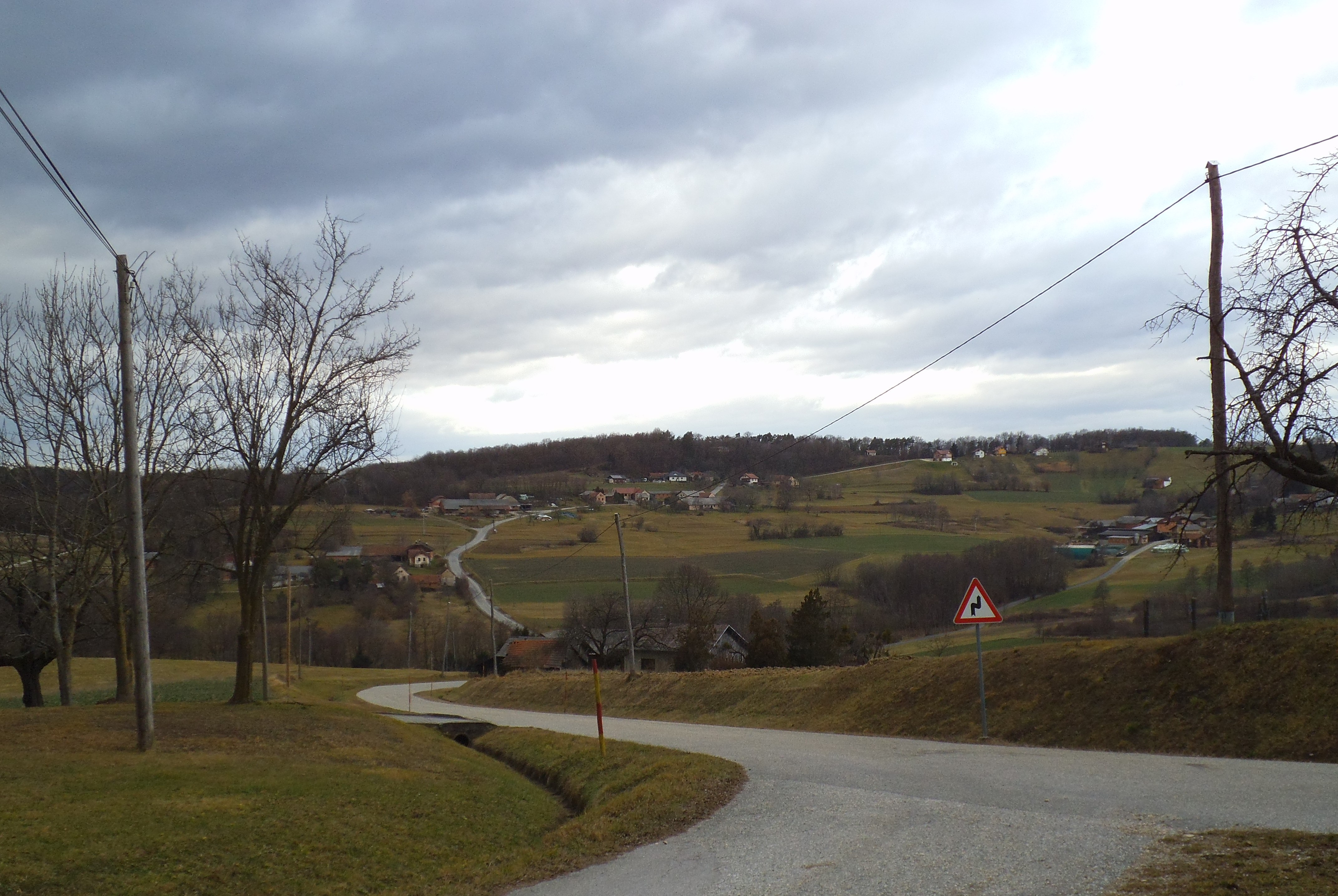

- Location in Slovenia
- Coordinates: 46°46′39.58″N 16°11′15.35″E
- Country: Slovenia
- Traditional region: Prekmurje
- Statistical region: Mura
- Municipality: Puconci

Area
  - Total: 5.87 km^{2} (2.27 sq mi)
- Elevation: 320.2 m (1,051 ft)

Population (2002)
  - Total: 194

Kuštanovci (pronounced [ˈkuːʃtanɔu̯tsi]; Hungarian: Gesztenyés, Prekmurje Slovene: Küštanovci) is a village in the Municipality of Puconci in the Prekmurje region of Slovenia.

There is a small chapel with a belfry by the village cemetery, built in the early 20th century.

== Notable people ==
Notable people that were born or lived in Kuštanovci include:

- Feri Horvat (born 1941 in Kuštanovci, lived in Radenci, died 2021), politician
