= Andrej Magajna =

Slovenian politician (born 1952)

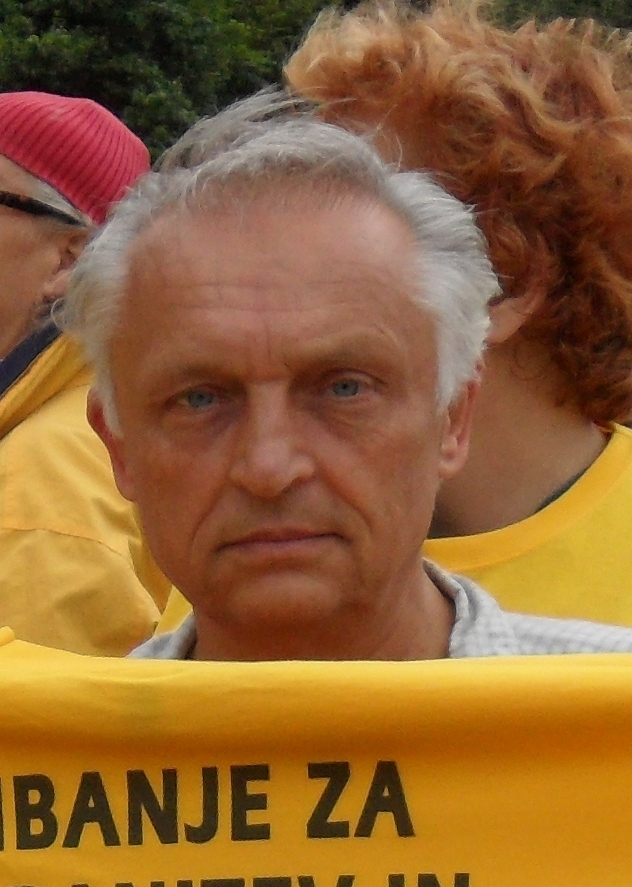
- Andrej Magajna at the Rally for the Protection of Public Healthcare, June 2013 in Ljubljana
- Born: 4 May 1952 (age 74); Ljubljana, Slovenia
- Occupation: Politician

Andrej Magajna (born 4 May 1952 in Ljubljana) is a Slovenian politician.

== Biography ==
Before 1990, Magajna was active in trade union work and participated in efforts to reform the electoral system. He supported open candidate lists and advocated his views through various articles and publications.

In 1989, together with France Tomšič and Gorazd Drevenšek, he co-founded the SDZS (Social Democratic Union of Slovenia). In 1990, he helped establish the DEMOS coalition and was a member of the Social Democratic Union of Slovenia (SDSS). He was elected to the first Slovenian National Assembly, but following a dispute with Jože Pučnik, he continued his term as an independent MP.

In 1991, he co-founded the Union of the Unemployed and Socially Vulnerable of Slovenia and also founded the Christian Socialist Party of Slovenia. He is a member and president of the Society for the Unemployed of Slovenia.

Since 12 September 2007, he has been the president of the political party New Social Democracy.

In the 2011 parliamentary elections, he ran on the SMS list. In the 2022 elections, his party participated as part of the Let's Connect Slovenia coalition but failed to gain parliamentary representation.

In mid-July 2022, he announced his candidacy for President of the Republic of Slovenia in the 2022 Slovenian presidential election, but withdrew his candidacy in early August 2022.

He later reversed his decision and officially re-launched his candidacy on 18 August 2022 at a press conference in Ljubljana. On 20 September, he withdrew again, citing media blackout as the reason.
