= Roman Jakič =

Slovene politician (born 1967)

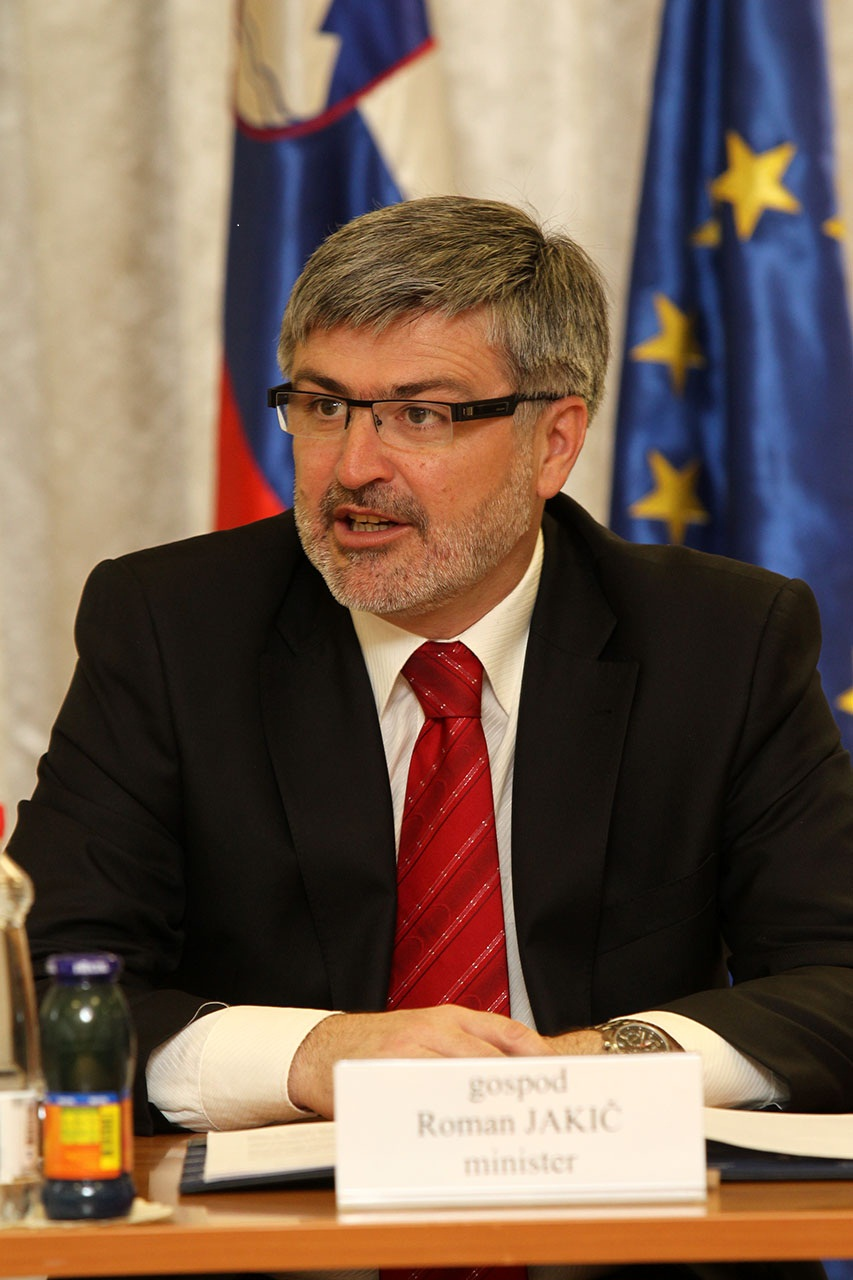
- Roman Jakič in 2013

Minister of Defence
- In office 2013 – 2014
- Prime Minister: Alenka Bratušek
- Preceded by: Aleš Hojs
- Succeeded by: Janko Veber

Observer to the European Parliament
- In office 2003 – 2004
- Constituency: Slovenia

Personal details
- Born: 1 May 1967 (age 58) Ljubljana, Socialist Republic of Slovenia, SFR Yugoslavia
- Party: European Parliament: ALDE; Slovenia: LDS

Roman Jakič (born 1 May 1967 in Ljubljana) is a Slovenian politician. He was a Member of the European Parliament in 2004 and served as defence minister from 2013 to 2014.

== See also ==
- List of members of the European Parliament for Slovenia, 2004
