= Feri Horvat =

Slovenian politician (1941–2020)

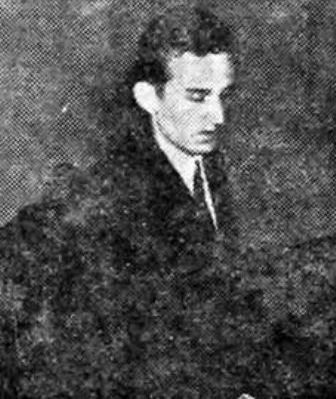

Speaker of the National Assembly of Slovenia
- In office 12 July 2004 – 22 October 2004
- Preceded by: Borut Pahor
- Succeeded by: France Cukjati

Personal details
- Born: 26 September 1941 Gesztenyés, Kingdom of Hungary (now Slovenia)
- Died: 1 August 2020 (aged 78) Radenci, Slovenia
- Party: League of Communists of Slovenia (until 1990); Social Democrats

Feri Horvat (Slovene pronunciation: [ˈfɛ́ːri ˈxɔ́ːrʋat]; 26 September 1941 – 1 August 2020) was a Slovenian manager and politician, and one of the founders of the United List of Social Democrats, now known as the Social Democrats. Between July and October 2004, he served as speaker of the Slovenian National Assembly.

He was born as Franc Horvat in a Slovene Lutheran family in the village of Kuštanovci in the Prekmurje region of eastern Slovenia (then part of the Horthy's Hungary). He studied economics at the University of Maribor. In the 1960s and 1970s, he served as director of several Slovenian companies, both in the industrial and financial sector. Between 1988 and 1991, he served as Secretary for Tourism and Commerce in the Federal Government of the Socialist Federal Republic of Yugoslavia. During this period, he was a staunch supporter of the economic reforms of the Yugoslav Prime Minister Ante Marković, aimed at introducing the market system in the Yugoslav economy.

After the dissolution of Yugoslavia in 1991, Horvat returned to Slovenia, where he was among the co-founders of the United List of Social Democrats, a left wing party which was established by the merger of the former League of Communists of Slovenia and other minor leftist parties.

In 1992, he was elected to the Slovenian National Assembly (the lower house of the Parliament of Slovenia). He covered several important functions in the parliamentary work. In June 2004, he was elected speaker of the National Assembly, thus replacing Borut Pahor, who had been elected to the European Parliament. He held this position until the Slovenian parliamentary elections of 2004, when he was replaced by France Cukjati, a member of the winning Slovenian Democratic Party.

Political offices
Preceded by Borut Pahor	Speaker of the National Assembly of Slovenia; June 2004 – October 2004	Succeeded by France Cukjati
