= 2004 Slovenian parliamentary election =

- 3 October 2004
- All 90 seats in the National Assembly; 46 seats needed for a majority
- Turnout: 60.64% (▼9.45 pp)
Party	Leader	Vote %	Seats	+/–
SDS	Janez Janša	29.08	29	+15
LDS	Anton Rop	22.80	23	−11
ZLSD	Borut Pahor	10.17	10	−1
NSi	Andrej Bajuk	9.09	9	+1
SLS	Janez Podobnik	6.82	7	−2
SNS	Zmago Jelinčič	6.27	6	+2
DeSUS	Anton Rous	4.04	4	0
This lists parties that won seats. See the complete results below.
Prime Minister before	Prime Minister after
Anton Rop; LDS	Janez Janša; SDS

Parliamentary elections were held in Slovenia on Sunday, 3 October 2004 to elect the 90 deputies of the National Assembly. A total of 1,390 male and female candidates ran in the election, organized into 155 lists. The lists were compiled both by official political parties and the groups of voters not registered as political parties. Five candidates applied for the seat of the representative of the Hungarian "national community" (as minorities are officially called in Slovenia) and only one candidate applied for the seat of the representative of the Italian national community. In the previous election (2000), fewer than 1000 candidates on 155 lists applied.

== Electoral system ==
In Slovenia, elections in the National Assembly are held in eight voting units, each of which further divides into 11 districts. Different candidates apply in each of the eighty-eight districts. From each of eight units, 11 deputies get elected; however, not necessarily one deputy from each district (from some districts nobody gets elected, from others up to four candidates enter the parliament). Deputy's mandates are distributed at two levels: at the level of the voting unit and at the level of the state. In practice, at the level of voting units two thirds of mandates get allotted, while one third gets allotted at the level of the state. In this manner, 88 mandates get distributed. The remaining two seats are assigned to the representatives of the Italian and Hungarian minorities, which get elected separately (in the ninth and tenth voting units) by the Borda count. Altogether, 90 deputies are elected in the parliament. The election threshold for a party to enter the parliament is four per cent.

== List of parties and candidates participating in the elections ==
[Candidates listed in bold were elected to the National Assembly.]

- AS - Active Slovenia
- **DeSUS - Democratic Party of Slovenian Pensioners**
- Democratic Party of Slovenia
- Women's Voice of Slovenia - GŽZ, Association for Primorsko - ZZP, Union of Independents of Slovenia - ZNS, New Democracy of Slovenia - NDS.
- June List
- **LDS - Liberal Democracy of Slovenia**
- Advance, Slovenia
- **NSi - New Slovenia - Christian People's Party**
- SEG - Party of Ecological Movements
- SJN - Slovenia is Ours
- **SDS - Slovenian Democratic Party**
- **SNS - Slovenian National Party**
- **SLS - Slovene People's Party**
- SMS - Youth Party of Slovenia
- Social and Liberal Party
- Party of the Slovenian Nation
- The List for Enterprising Slovenia
- **ZLSD - United List of Social Democrats**
- The United for an Independent and Just Slovenia
- Green Party of Slovenia
- Marko Brecelj
- Mihael Svanjak
- Independent candidate Stefan Hudobivnik

The candidate for the representative of Italian minority:

- Roberto Battelli

The candidates for the representatives of Hungarian minority:

- Mária Pozsonec
- Jožef Kocon
- Franc Vida
- György Tomka
- Janez Bogdan

== Results ==
Party	Votes	%	Seats	+/–
Slovenian Democratic Party	281,710	29.08	29	+15
Liberal Democracy of Slovenia	220,848	22.80	23	–11
United List of Social Democrats	98,527	10.17	10	–1
New Slovenia – Christian People's Party	88,073	9.09	9	+1
Slovenian People's Party	66,032	6.82	7	–2
Slovenian National Party	60,750	6.27	6	+2
Democratic Party of Pensioners of Slovenia	39,150	4.04	4	0
Active Slovenia	28,767	2.97	0	New
Slovenia is Ours	25,343	2.62	0	New
Youth Party of Slovenia	20,174	2.08	0	–4
June List	8,733	0.90	0	New
Greens of Slovenia	6,703	0.69	0	0
List for Enterprising Slovenia	5,435	0.56	0	New
GŽS–ZZP–ZNS–NDS	5,229	0.54	0	0
Party of Ecological Movements	3,991	0.41	0	New
Democratic Party of Slovenia	2,670	0.28	0	0
Party of Slovenian People	2,574	0.27	0	New
United for an Independent and Just Slovenia	1,496	0.15	0	New
Forward Slovenia	995	0.10	0	0
Liberal Party	713	0.07	0	New
Independents	859	0.09	0	0
Hungarian and Italian ethnic minorities			2	0
Total	968,772	100.00	90	0
Valid votes	968,772	97.74		
Invalid/blank votes	22,351	2.26		
Total votes	991,123	100.00		
Registered voters/turnout	1,634,402	60.64		
Source: DVK

== Opinion polls ==
Fieldwork date	Polling firm	Publisher(s)	Sample size	LDS	SDS	ZLSD	SLS	NSi	DeSUS	SNS	SMS	AS	SJN	Others	None	Und.	Abst.	Lead	Source
22-24 Sep 2004	Ninamedia	Dnevnik	1,609	14.8	12.0	4.6	2.5	4.8	2.0	3.8	1.9	1.8	1.5	0.7		38.3	11.2	2.8	
14-16 Sep 2004	Ninamedia	Dnevnik	1,000	18.4	11.2	4.1	1.2	4.2	0.7	2.6	1.3	–	–	1.2		46.8	8.5	7.2	
8-9 Sep 2004	Ninamedia	Dnevnik	700	13.9	10.6	5.3	1.1	4.5	2.3	2.6	0.5	–	–	1.6		44.3	13.3	3.3	

== Structure of the National Assembly ==
The structure of parties was modified in April 2007, so the following roster is different from 2004. The list can change further, because some deputies can still be promoted to ministers.

=== Delegation of Slovenska demokratska stranka (SDS) [Slovenian Democratic Party] ===
- Cukjati France
- Černač Zvonko
- Dobrajc Polonca
- Grill Ivan
- Grims Branko
- Homan Bojan
- Hrovat Robert
- Hvauc Srečko
- Irgl Eva
- Jazbec Franc
- Jeraj Alenka
- Jerovšek Jožef
- Kovačič Dimitrij
- Krivec Danijel
- Ljubeljšek Mitja
- Marinič Branko
- Pajk Stane
- Petan Rudolf
- Petek Miro
- Pojbič Marijan
- Pukšič Franc
- Rugelj Bojan
- Starman Bojan
- Sušnik Franc
- Štebe Tomaž
- Tanko Jože
- Veršnik Rudi
- Zamernik Bogomir
- Ziherl Milenko

=== Delegation of Socialni demokrati (SD) [United List of Social Democrats] ===
- Bevk Samo
- Cvikl Milan M.
- Han Matjaž
- Horvat Franc (Feri)
- Juri Aurelio
- Kontič Bojan
- Kumer Dušan
- Lavtižar Bebler Darja
- Pavliha Marko
- Pečan Breda
- Potrata Majda
- Potrč Miran
- Rop Anton
- Veber Janko

=== Delegation of Liberalna demokracija Slovenije (LDS) [Liberal Democracy of Slovenia] ===
- Anderlič Anton
- Džuban Geza
- Germič Ljubo
- Gulič Aleš
- Jerič Miran
- Moge Rudolf
- Petek Milan
- Sajovic Borut
- Slavinec Mitja
- Školč Jožef
- Švagan Matjaž

=== Delegation of Nova Slovenija (NSi) [New Slovenia] ===
- Drobnič Janez
- Horvat Jožef
- Kokalj Anton
- Koren Drago
- Kucler Dolinar Mojca
- Mikolič Martin
- Sok Alojz
- Testen Ciril
- Uhan Marjetka

=== Delegation of Slovenska ljudska stranka (SLS) [Slovenian People's Party] ===
- Bajc Josip
- Brenčič Stanislav
- Drofenik Marjan
- Janc Kristijan
- Kramberger Janez
- Presečnik Jakob
- Prevc Mihael

=== Delegation of Nepovezani poslanci (NP) [Group of unaligned deputies] ===
- Gantar Pavel
- Lahovnik Matej
- Posedel Alojz
- Širca Majda
- Terčon Davorin
- Trofenik Vili
- Zalokar Oražem Cvetka

=== Delegation of Slovenska nacionalna stranka (SNS) [Slovenian National Party] ===
- Barovič Bogdan
- Jelinčič Plemeniti Zmago
- Peče Sašo
- Prijatelj Srečko
- Zagorac Boštjan
- Žgajner Tavš Barbara

=== Delegation of Demokratična stranka upokojencev Slovenije (DeSUS) [Democratic Party of Pensioners of Slovenia] ===
- Jelen Ivan
- Klavora Vasja
- Rezman Vili
- Žnidaršič Franc

=== Delegation of Italijanska in madžarska narodna skupnost (NS) [Representatives of the Italian and Hungarian Minority] ===
- Battelli Roberto
- Pozsonec Mária

=== Nepovezani poslanec (NeP) [Unaligned deputy] ===
- Gaber Slavko
