= 2008 Slovenian parliamentary election =

- 21 September 2008

88 of the 90 seats in the National Assembly
- Turnout: 63.10% (▲2.46 pp)
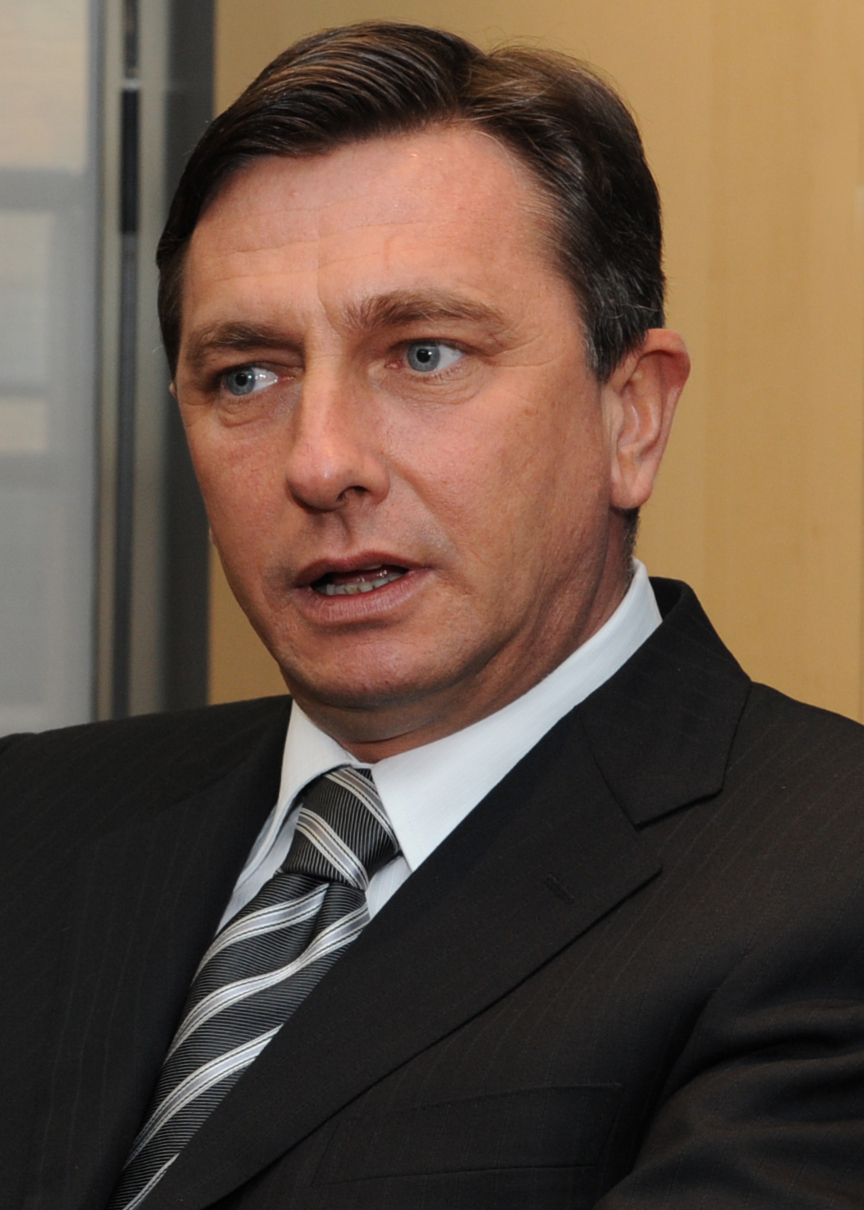

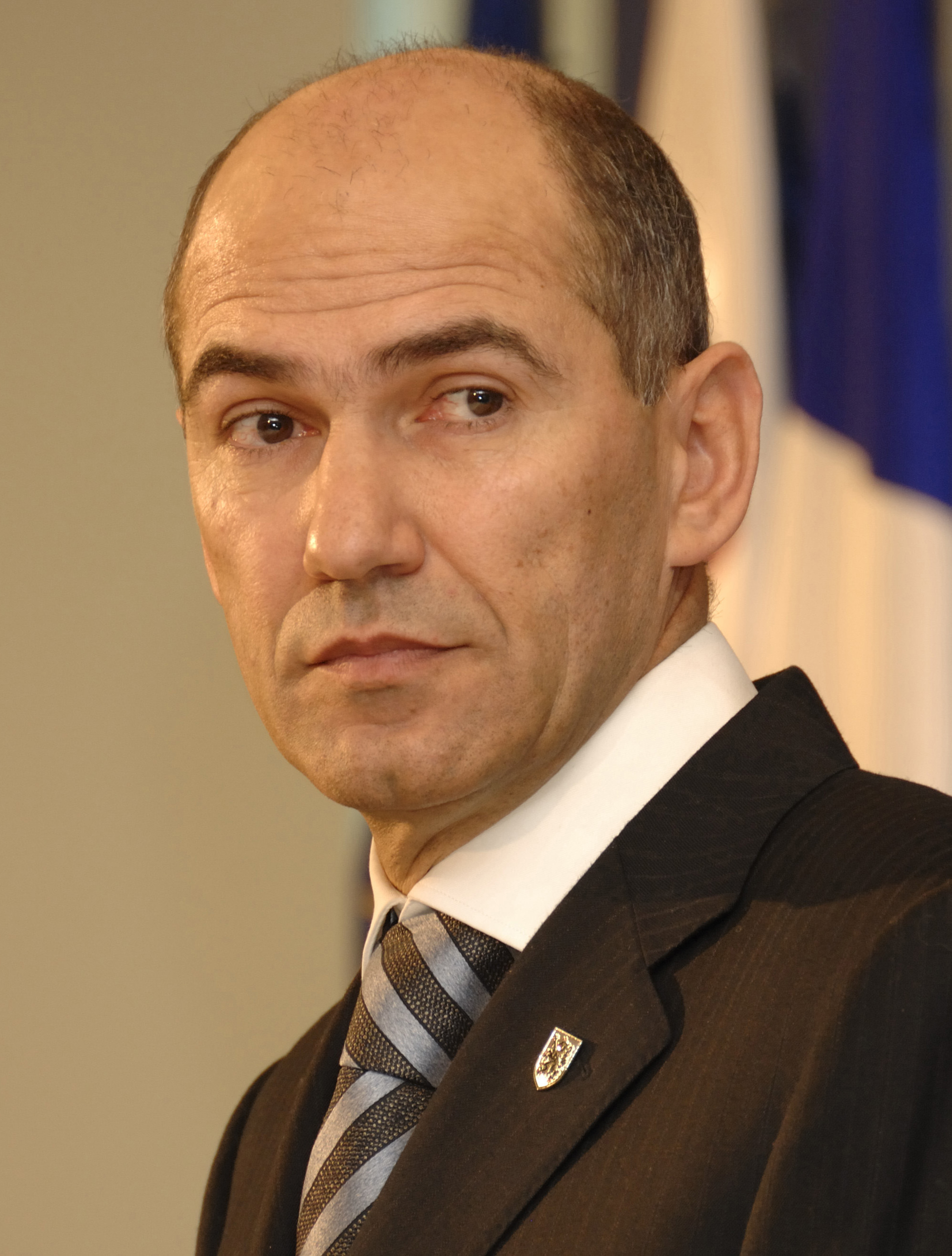

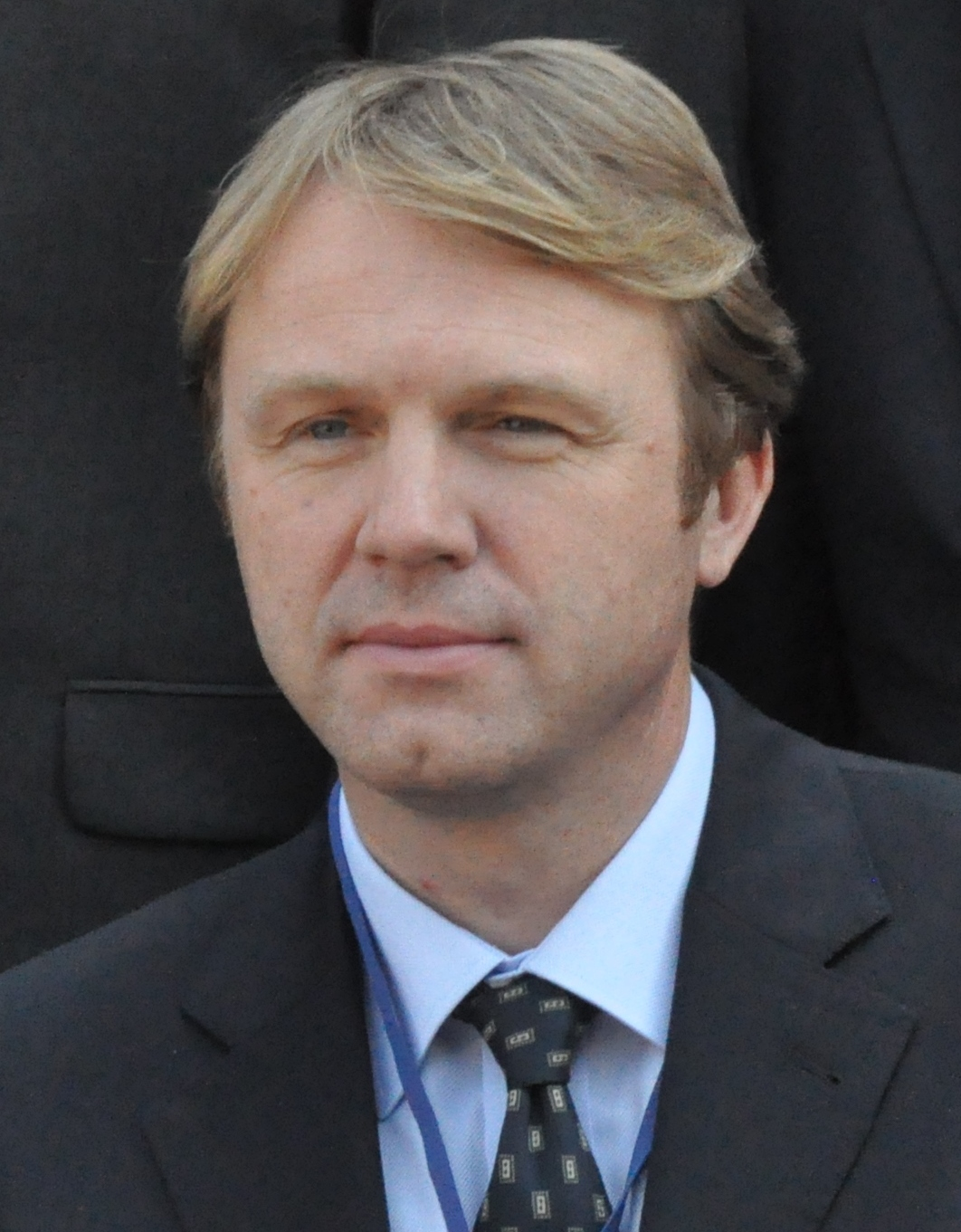

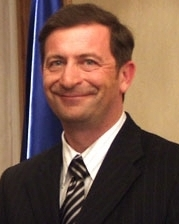

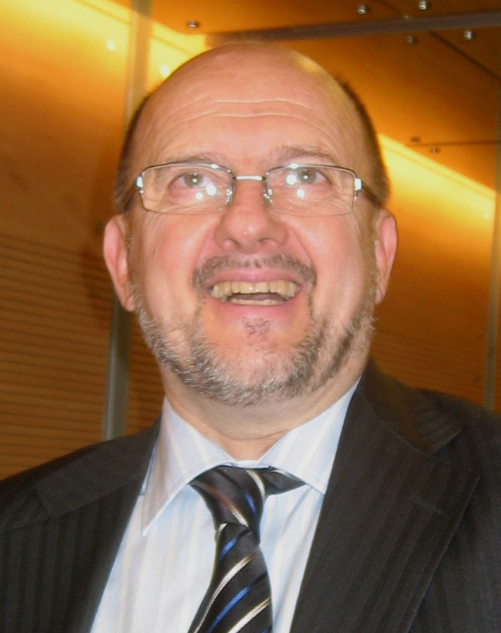

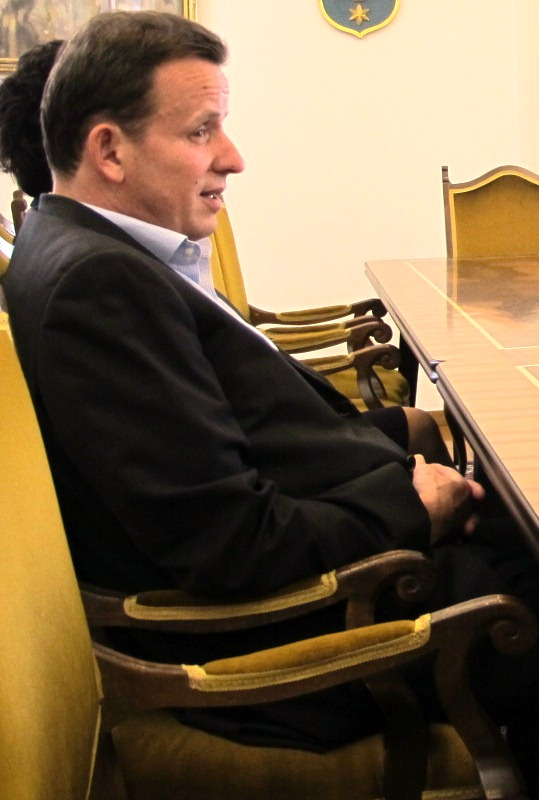

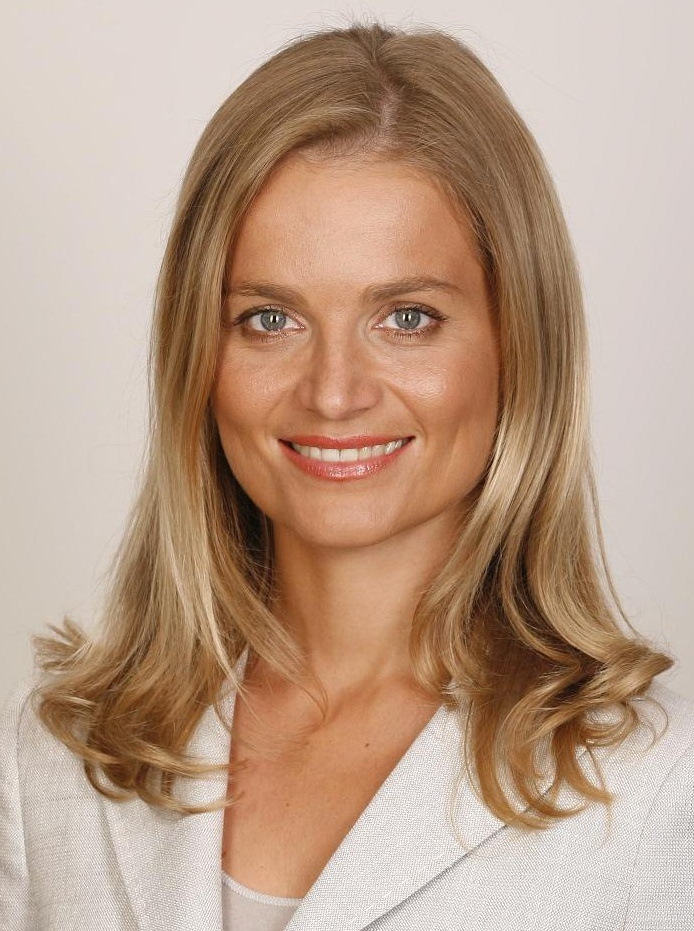
	First party	Second party	Third party
Leader	Borut Pahor	Janez Janša	Gregor Golobič
Party	SD	SDS	Zares
Last election	10 seats	29 seats	New
Seats won	29	28	9
Seat change	▲19	▼1	New
Popular vote	320,248	307,735	98,526
Percentage	30.45%	29.26%	9.37%
	Fourth party	Fifth party	Sixth party
Leader	Karl Erjavec	Zmago Jelinčič	Bojan Šrot
Party	DeSUS	SNS	SLS
Last election	4 seats	6 seats	7 seats
Seats won	7	5	5
Seat change	▲3	▼1	▼2
Popular vote	78,353	56,832	54,809
Percentage	7.45%	5.40%	5.21%
	Seventh party
Leader	Katarina Kresal
Party	LDS
Last election	23 seats
Seats won	5
Seat change	▼18
Popular vote	54,771
Percentage	5.21%
Prime Minister before election
Janez Janša
SDS
Prime Minister after election
Borut Pahor
SD

Parliamentary elections were held in Slovenia on 21 September 2008 to elect the 90 deputies of the National Assembly. Seventeen parties filed to run in the election, including all nine parliamentary parties. A plurality of seats was won by the Social Democrats, which subsequently formed a coalition government together with Zares, the Liberal Democracy of Slovenia, and the Democratic Party of Pensioners of Slovenia.

== Electoral system ==
Of the 90 seats, 88 are elected using the D'Hondt method of list proportional representation, with a 4% threshold.

== Opinion polls ==
Fieldwork date	Polling firm	Publisher(s)	Sample size	SDS	LDS	SD	NSi	SLS	SNS	DeSUS	Zares	Lipa	KDS	Others	None	Und.	Abst.	Lead	Source
21 Sep 2008	Interstat	RTV		28.0	5.2	32.0	–	4.3	5.6	6.7	10.1	–	–	–				4.0	
21 Sep 2008	Mediana	POP TV		27.7	6.1	31.5	2.6	4.2	5.8	7.6	9.7	2.3	–	–				3.8	
Exit polls
6-11 Sep 2008	Ninamedia	Dnevnik	1,544	29.9	7.8	20.7	2.7	5.9	7.6	8.0	10.8	2.7	–	4.5	–			9.2	
1-4 Sep 2008	Ninamedia	Dnevnik	1,000	20.0	5.1	16.3	1.6	1.9	3.4	6.2	6.0	0.4	–	0.4	7.5	31.4	–	3.7	
26-28 Aug 2008	Ninamedia	Dnevnik	663	20.8	5.7	18.6	2.2	2.5	2.7	3.5	5.9	0.6	0.1	0.1	7.7	29.0	–	2.2	

Polling Firm	Date	SD	SDS	Zares	SNS	LDS	DeSUS	SLS	NSi	Others
Ninamedia	15–17 July 2008	25.7%	22.4%	8.4%	6.3%	7.2%	4.5%	1.7%	1.5%	22.3%
Ninamedia	20–22 May 2008	22.1%	18.9%	8.6%	6.8%	6.6%	4.2%	2.4%	1.9%	37.1%
Delo	26–29 May 2008	19.2%	15.2%	6.3%	5.9%	4.7%	3.0%	2.2%	2.1%	41.4%

=== Exit polls ===
According to exit polls, conducted by the Interstat agency for Radiotelevizija Slovenija, Social Democrats (SD) won the most votes, 32.02%. Slovenian Democratic Party (SDS) finished second with 28.04%. Other parties followed: Zares 10.05%, Democratic Party of Pensioners of Slovenia (DeSUS) 6.74%, Slovenian National Party (SNS) 5.58%, Liberal Democracy of Slovenia (LDS) 5.21%, and Slovenian People's Party (SLS) with Youth Party of Slovenia (SMS) 4.28%. New Slovenia (NSi) and Lipa, the parliamentary parties before the elections, did not reach the 4% limit.

According to exit polls, conducted by the Mediana agency for POP TV, the results are following: SD 31.5%, SDS 27.7%, Zares 9.7%, DeSUS 7.6%, LDS 6.1%, SNS 5.8%, SLS-SMS 4.2%. The margin was not reached by NSi (2.6%) and Lipa (2.3%).

== Results ==
A total of 17 parties contested the election, including all 9 political parties that already held seats in the National Assembly. The Social Democrats won the most seats with 29 elected deputies, far below a majority of 45. The Social Democrats eventually came to an agreement with Zares, the Liberal Democracy of Slovenia, and the Democratic Party of Pensioners of Slovenia to form a coalition government.

Party	Votes	%	Seats	+/–
Social Democrats	320,248	30.45	29	+19
Slovenian Democratic Party	307,735	29.26	28	–1
Zares	98,526	9.37	9	New
Democratic Party of Pensioners of Slovenia	78,353	7.45	7	+3
Slovenian National Party	56,832	5.40	5	–1
Slovenian People's Party–Youth Party	54,809	5.21	5	–2
Liberal Democracy of Slovenia	54,771	5.21	5	–18
New Slovenia – Christian People's Party	35,774	3.40	0	–9
Lipa	19,068	1.81	0	New
List for Justice and Development	5,897	0.56	0	New
Greens of Slovenia	5,367	0.51	0	0
Christian Democratic Party	4,724	0.45	0	New
List for Clear Drinking Water	4,140	0.39	0	New
Party of Slovenian People	2,629	0.25	0	0
Green Coalition: Green Party and Green Progress	2,230	0.21	0	New
Forward Slovenia	475	0.05	0	0
Acacias	249	0.02	0	New
Hungarian and Italian national communities			2	0
Total	1,051,827	100.00	90	0
Valid votes	1,051,827	98.26		
Invalid/blank votes	18,597	1.74		
Total votes	1,070,424	100.00		
Registered voters/turnout	1,696,437	63.10		
Source: DVK

== See also ==
- Patria case
