= Socialist Party of Slovenia =

Defunct political party in Slovenia

The Socialist Party of Slovenia (Slovene: Socialistična stranka Slovenije, abbreviated SSS) was a political party in Slovenia. It was founded in 1990, as the successor of the Socialist Union of Working People of Slovenia (which in January 1990 had broken away from its Yugoslav parent organization and became an independent association). The founding conference of the party was held in Ljubljana on June 9, 1990. The party was led by Viktor Žakelj (the president of the party) and Ciril Zlobec.

The party participated in the first free parliamentary election in Slovenia that took place in April 1990, obtaining 58,082 votes (5.37%) and five seats. After the election, the party formed part of the opposition to the DEMOS government, although it was generally more supportive of the government policies than the other two opposition parties (the Party of Democratic Renewal and especially the Liberal Democratic Party). Differently with the reluctance of the rest of the opposition regarding the government's plans for secession from Yugoslavia, the Socialist Party openly supported Slovenia's independence from the early period: in 1990, they were the first party to propose a referendum on Slovenian independence.

In 1992, after the fall of the DEMOS government, the Socialist Party entered in the coalition that supported Janez Drnovšek's first government. In the subsequent 1992 parliamentary elections, the party failed to win representation: it obtained 32,696 votes (2.75%) and no seat in parliament.

The party ceased to exist in March 1994 as it merged into the Liberal Democracy of Slovenia, together with the Liberal Democratic Party of Slovenia, the Democratic Party of Slovenia and the Greens - Ecological Social Party.

== Prominent members ==
- Viktor Žakelj
- Ciril Zlobec
- Borut Šuklje
- Anton Bebler
