= Slovenian People's Party =

Slovenian People's Party Slovenska ljudska stranka
- Leader: Tina Bregant
- Founder: Ivan Oman
- Founded: 12 May 1988
- Preceded by: Slovene People's Party (legal predecessor)
- Headquarters: Gospodinjska ulica 8, Ljubljana
- Newspaper: Slovenec
- Youth wing: New Generation of the Slovenian People's Party
- Women's wing: Slovenian Women's Union at the Slovenian People's Party
- Ideology: Conservatism; Agrarianism; Christian democracy Pro-Europeanism
- Political position: Centre-right
- National affiliation: Skupaj v Akcijo
- European affiliation: European People's Party
- European Parliament group: European People's Party
- Colours: Green and blue
- National Assembly: 1 / 90
- European Parliament: 0 / 9
- Mayors: 6 / 212
- Municipal council: 163 / 2,750

Website
- sls.si

The Slovenian People's Party (Slovene: Slovenska ljudska stranka, pronounced [slɔˈʋèːnska ˈljúːtska ˈstráːŋka], Slovene abbreviation SLS [ɛsɛlˈɛ́(ː)s]) is a conservative, agrarian, Christian democratic political party in Slovenia. Formed in 1988 under the name of Slovenian Peasant Union as the first democratic political organization in Yugoslavia, it changed its name to Slovenian People's Party in 1992. On 15 April 2000, it merged with the Slovene Christian Democrats to form the SLS+SKD Slovenian People's Party, and changed its name in 2001 to Slovenian People's Party.

SLS won seats in the National Parliament in general elections in Slovenia in the years 1992, 1996, 2000, 2004, 2008, 2011, but missed the parliamentary threshold in 2014. SLS won 6.83% of the vote at the early 2011 Slovenian parliamentary election on 4 December 2011, thus gaining six seats in the National Assembly. From March 2013 to December 2014, Franc Bogovič led SLS. In the 2014 European Parliamentary elections, SLS got their first seat in the European Parliament with Franc Bogovič being elected member of the European Parliament on the NSi and SLS joint-list. Despite SLS narrowly missed the parliamentary threshold in July 2014, it had been victorious in local elections in October 2014. On 6 December 2014 Marko Zidanšek took over the party, but did not manage to return to the parliament in the 2018 elections. After elections Marko Zidanšek resigned and subsequently Marjan Podobnik got elected president. In 2019 Franc Bogovič was elected member of the European Parliament once again on the SDS and SLS joint-list. Prior to the parliamentary elections in 2022, the party initiated the new movement Connect Slovenia (Povežimo Slovenijo), which consisted of the parties Konkretno, Zeleni Slovenije, New People's Party and New Social Democracy. After the movement failed to enter the parliament, Marjan Podobnik resigned.

In July 2022, Marko Balažic took over as president.

== Establishment and early years ==
The Slovenian People's Party was established in May 1988 under the name of Slovenian Peasant Union (Slovenska kmečka zveza, SKZ) as the first openly non-Communist political organization in Slovenia and Yugoslavia after 1945. The establishment of the Slovenian Peasant Union is frequently considered one of the crucial events in the Slovenian Spring of 1988. In January 1989, it could register as a party. In the first multi-party election in Slovenia, the Peasant Union ran as a part of the DEMOS coalition and won 11 of the 80 seats in the Slovenian Parliament. The party's name was changed to the current form in 1991, alluding to the pre-war Catholic conservative Slovene People's Party. The renaming of the party caused a controversy with the Slovene Christian Democrats, who considered themselves the official heirs of the pre-war Slovene People's Party, since the Slovene People's Party in exile merged with the Slovene Christian Democrats in 1990.

In 1992, Marjan Podobnik was elected president of the party. Under his leadership, the Slovenian People's Party pursued an agrarian, ethnonationalist and corporatist ideology. In 1992, the founder of the Slovenian Peasant Union Ivan Oman left the party and joined the Slovene Christian Democrats, who were then part of the ruling centrist grand coalition.

Between 1992 and 1996, the Slovene People's Party was, together with the Slovenian National Party, the largest opposition party. Its ideology and policies were marked by a populist shift. In late 1995, representatives of the People's Party called for a referendum to suspend the citizenship of non-ethnic Slovenes. The attempt was stopped by the Constitutional Court.

Ahead of the parliamentary election of 1996, the People's Party formed the Slovenian Spring alliance together with the Slovene Christian Democrats (SKD), that referred to the historical Slovenian People's Party, as well. However the alliance, was disbanded immediately after the elections, when the SLS joined a coalition government with the Liberal Democracy of Slovenia (LDS), while the SKD went into opposition. In April 2000, strains between SLS and the Liberal Democrats led to the former's withdrawal from the coalition. In early May, SLS, SKD and SDS elected Christian democrat Andrej Bajuk prime minister instead.

== Merger ==
On 15 April 2000, the Slovene Christian Democrats merged into the Slovenian People's Party, and the abbreviation was temporarily changed to SLS+SKD to signify both predecessors. However, as early as in July of the same year rifts emerged, based on the question of a new electoral system. Therefore, Prime Minister Bajuk, Lojze Peterle, and other centrist Christian democrats left the unified party to form New Slovenia – Christian People's Party (NSi) in August. The remaining People's Party performed poorly in the election in October 2000, but became part of the Liberal-led coalition government of Janez Drnovšek.

== After 2004 ==
In the legislative election on 3 October 2004, the party won 6.8% of the popular vote and 7 out of 90 seats. Led by Janez Podobnik, the brother of former chairman Marjan Podobnik, the party entered in the centre-right government of Janez Janša.

In 2007, the mayor of Celje Bojan Šrot replaced Marjan Podobnik as president of the party. This change in leadership coincided with a policy shift. Upon his election, Šrot announced he wanted to transform the SLS in the largest centre-right party in Slovenia, thus challenging the primacy of Janez Janša's Slovenian Democratic Party. Šrot started criticizing some of the neo-liberal reforms launched by Janša's government, and especially Janša's "anti-tycoon" policies, aimed against concentration of wealth in the hands of a small group of executive managers of privatized former state-owned firms. One of these "tycoons" was also Boško Šrot, Bojan Šrot's brother, and CEO of the Laško Brewery company.

In the 2008 election the SLS ran a joint list with the Youth Party of Slovenia. In the electoral campaign, the party tried to distance itself from its former coalition allies. The joint list secured only 5 seats and 5.2% of the vote, a loss of 2 compared to the results of the SLS in 2004.

In 2009, Radovan Žerjav, former Minister of Transport in Janez Janša government, replaced Šrot as the leader of the party. Under his leadership, the SLS adopted a more moderate rhetorics. After 11 years in power, the party stayed in opposition, trying to forge an image of a constructive opposition party, supporting moderate conservative policies.

In the 2011 election, the SLS increased its support both in number of voters and in percentage, thus reversing the falling trend for the first time after the 2000 election.

In the 2014 European election, SLS ran in a joint electoral list with New Slovenia, which received 16.56% of the vote and came in second place, returning 2 MEPs.

The party received 3.98% of the vote in the Slovenian parliamentary election on 13 July 2014, narrowly missing the 4% threshold for representation in the parliament. In 2018 it received only 2.62% of the votes and next day the leader Marko Zidanšek resigned. The party decided that Primož Jelševar would lead the party until the next regular party congress.

Parliamentary representation:

== Election results ==
=== National Assembly ===
Election	Leader	Votes	%	Seats	+/–	Government
1990	Ivan Oman	135,808	12.55 (#4)	11 / 90	New	Coalition
1992	Marjan Podobnik	103,300	8.69 (#5)	10 / 90	▼1	Opposition
1996	Marjan Podobnik	207,186	19.38 (#2)	19 / 90	▲9	Opposition 1996-1997
1996	Marjan Podobnik	207,186	19.38 (#2)	19 / 90	▲9	Coalition 1997-2000
2000 (Note: Run in coalition with SKD.)	Franc Zagožen	102,691	9.54 (#4)	9 / 90	▼10	Coalition 2002-2004
2000	Franc Zagožen	102,691	9.54 (#4)	9 / 90	▼10	Opposition 2004
2004	Janez Podobnik	66,032	6.82 (#5)	7 / 90	▼2	Coalition
2008 (Note: Run in coalition with Youth Party.)	Bojan Šrot	54,809	5.21 (#6)	5 / 90	▼2	Opposition
2011	Radovan Žerjav	75,311	6.83 (#6)	6 / 90	▲1	Coalition 2011-2013
2011	Radovan Žerjav	75,311	6.83 (#6)	6 / 90	▲1	Opposition 2013-2014
2014	Franc Bogovič	34,548	3.95 (#8)	0 / 90	▼6	Extra-parliamentary
2018	Marjan Podobnik	23,329	2.62 (#10)	0 / 90	0	Extra-parliamentary
2022 (Note: Run within Let's Connect Slovenia coalition.)	Marjan Podobnik	40,612	3.41 (#7)	0 / 90	0	Extra-parliamentary
2026 (Note: Run in a joint list with NSi and Fokus.)	Tina Bregant	109,201	9.26 (#3)	1 / 90	▲1	Coalition

=== European Parliament ===
Election	List leader	Votes	%	Seats	+/–	EP Group
2004	Franc But	36,662	8.41 (#5)	0 / 7	New	–
2009	Ivan Žagar	16,602	3.58 (#7)	0 / 8	0	–
2014 (Note: Run in a joint list with NSi.)	Lojze Peterle	66,760	16.60 (#2)	1 / 8	▲1	EPP
2019 (Note: Run in a joint list with SDS.)	Milan Zver	126,534	26.25 (#1)	1 / 8	0	EPP
2024	Peter Gregorčič	48,343	7.21 (#6)	0 / 9	▼1	–

== Presidents of the party ==
- Ivan Oman (1988–1992)
- Marjan Podobnik (1992–2000)
- Franc Zagožen (2000–2001)
- Franci But (2001–2003)
- Janez Podobnik (2003–2007)
- Bojan Šrot (2007–2009)
- Radovan Žerjav (2009–2013)
- Franc Bogovič (2013–2014)
- Marko Zidanšek (2014–2018)
- Marjan Podobnik (2018–2022)
- Marko Balažic (2022–2025)
- Tina Bregant (2025–present)

== Other prominent members ==
- Ludvik Toplak
- Tomaž Marušič
- Ivo Bizjak

== Youth wing ==
The New Generation of the Slovenian People's Party (Nova generacija SLS), SLS youth wing, is a non-governmental youth organization that brings together young people between the ages of 15 and 33 from all over Slovenia. It was formed on 1 July 2000 through the merger of the then SLS Youth and Young Christian Democrats. At the national level, the New Generation is organized into a congress, a leadership (consisting of a president and three vice presidents), a main committee, a supervisory committee, and an executive committee, as well as a general secretary and an international secretary. At the local level, Nova generacija is organised into regional committees and city or municipal committees. At the international level, Nova generacija is a full member of the Youth of the European People's Party (YEPP) and the Democrat Youth Community of Europe (DEMYC).
