= Janez Podobnik =

Slovenian politician

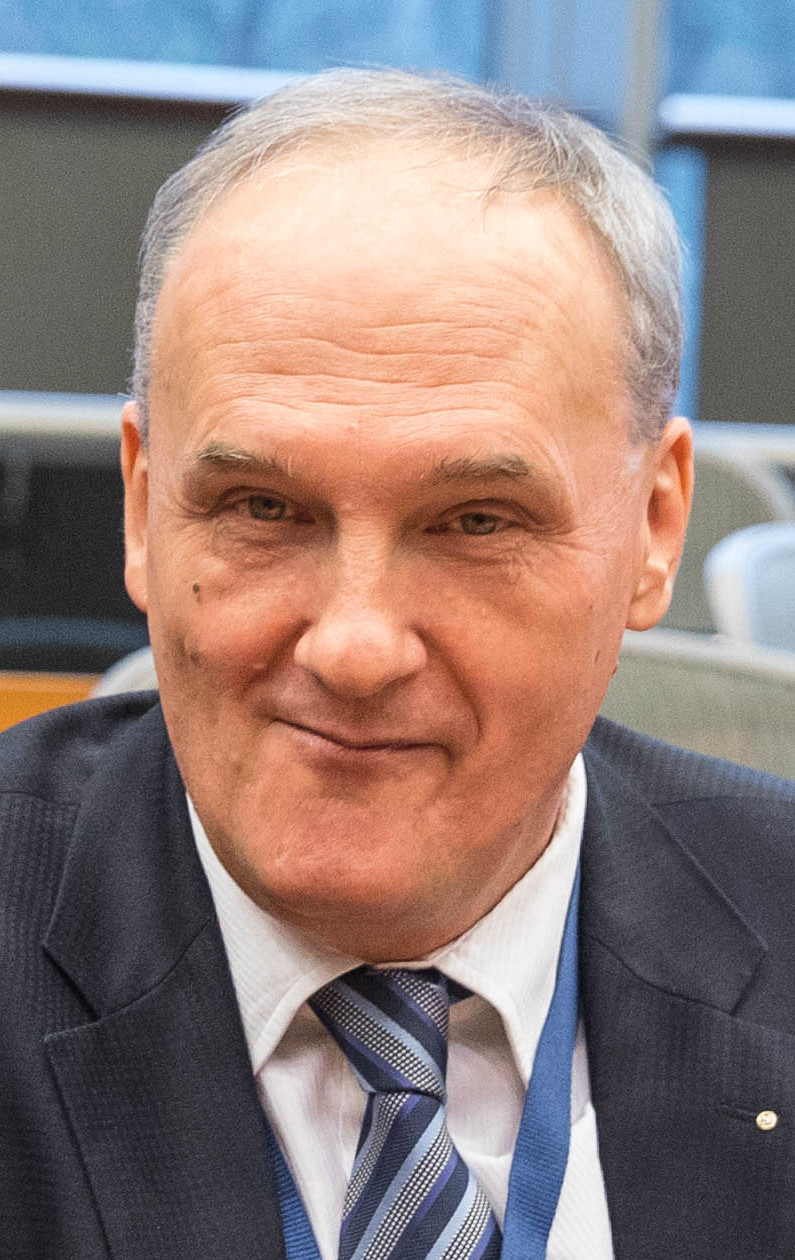
Podobnik in 2020

Janez Podobnik (born 17 September 1959) is a Slovenian conservative politician.

== Early life ==
Podobnik was born in the small town of Cerkno in western Slovenia, in what was then the Federal People's Republic of Yugoslavia. He studied medicine at the University of Ljubljana, where he graduated in 1984. From 1984 to 1990, he worked as a general physician in Idrija.

== Political career ==
He entered politics during the period of democratization known as the Slovenian spring. In 1990, he joined the Slovenian People's Party and was elected as the first non-communist mayor of Idrija after World War II. In 1992, he was elected to the Slovenian National Assembly. During the coalition government between the Slovenian People's Party and the left Liberal Democracy of Slovenia, Podobnik served as speaker of the National Assembly (1996–2000). In 1997, he unsuccessfully ran for president of Slovenia, but was defeated in a runoff by the incumbent Milan Kučan.

He was reelected to the parliament in 2000, and he served as the head of the parliament group of the Slovenian People's Party from 2000 to 2004. In 2003, he was elected president of the Slovenian People's Party. In 2004, the party entered the centre-right government led by Janez Janša, and Podobnik became minister of the environment. In November 2007, Podobnik resigned as president of the Slovenian People's Party, which was defeated in the parliamentary election in September 2008.

== Personal life ==
Podobnik is a devout Roman Catholic. He is married and has one child, Rok. His brother, Marjan Podobnik, also a politician, was the president of the Slovenian People's Party from 1992 to 2000, and deputy prime minister from 1997 to 2000.

Political offices
Preceded by Jožef Školč	Speaker of the National Assembly of Slovenia; 1996 – 2000	Succeeded by Borut Pahor
Preceded by Janez Kopač	Minister of Environment of Slovenia; 2004 – 2008	Succeeded by Karl Erjavec
Party political offices
Preceded by Franci But	President of the Slovenian People's Party; 2003 – 2008	Succeeded by Bojan Šrot
