= Greens of Slovenia =

Political party in Slovenia

Greens of Slovenia Zeleni Slovenije
- Leader: Andrej Čuš
- Founded: 11 June 1989
- Headquarters: Mestni trg 4, 2250 Ptuj
- Ideology: Green conservatism
- Political position: Centre-right
- National affiliation: ZS–SG
- Colours: Green
- National Assembly: 0 / 90
- European Parliament: 0 / 8
- Mayors: 0 / 212
- Municipal councillors: 8 / 2,750 (Note: Won 5 seats in Ptuj as List of Dr. Andrej Čuš - Together for Ptuj.)

The Greens of Slovenia (Slovene: Zeleni Slovenije, ZS), also known as Andrej Čuš and Greens of Slovenia, is a political party in Slovenia.

== History ==
The Greens of Slovenia was formed on 11 June 1989 in the course of the Revolutions of 1989, when Slovenia was still part of Yugoslavia. At the first direct election in Slovenia, the Greens gained 8.8% of the votes cast and won 8 seats in the National Assembly legislature. At the 1992 parliamentary election the party gained 3.7% of the votes cast, losing 3 mandates in the assembly. Since 1996, it has fallen beneath the electoral threshold, and thus is no longer represented in parliament.

At the parliamentary election in September 2008, the party won no seats. At the early 2011 Slovenian parliamentary election on 4 December 2011, the party won 0.36% of the vote, thus not gaining any seat in the National Assembly. The party received 0.50% of the vote in the Slovenian parliamentary election on 13 July 2014, and again did not win any seats in parliament.

In March 2018, Andrej Čuš took over the leadership and renamed the party Andrej Čuš and Greens of Slovenia (Slovene: Andrej Čuš in Zeleni Slovenije).

Europe Elects stated in April 2021 that the party displays the logo of the European Green Party (EGP) on their website; however, the EGP contacted Europe Elects and denied any affiliation.

== Election results ==
=== National Assembly ===
Election	Leader	Votes	%	Seats	+/–	Government
1990	Dušan Plut	95,640	8.84 (#6)	8 / 90	New	Coalition
1992	Dušan Plut	44,019	3.70 (#7)	5 / 90	▼3	Coalition 1992-1993
1992	Dušan Plut	44,019	3.70 (#7)	5 / 90	▼3	Opposition 1993-1996
1996	Vane Gošnik	18,853	1.76 (#9)	0 / 90	▼5	Extra-parliamentary
2000	Miha Jazbinšek	9,691	0.90 (#9)	0 / 90	0	Extra-parliamentary
2004	Vlado Čuš	6,703	0.69 (#12)	0 / 90	0	Extra-parliamentary
2008	Vlado Čuš	5,367	0.51 (#11)	0 / 90	0	Extra-parliamentary
2011	Vlado Čuš	4,000	0.36 (#14)	0 / 90	0	Extra-parliamentary
2014	Vlado Čuš	4,629	0.53 (#14)	0 / 90	0	Extra-parliamentary
2018	Andrej Čuš	9,708	1.09 (#13)	0 / 90	0	Extra-parliamentary
2022 (Note: Run within Let's Connect Slovenia coalition.)	Andrej Čuš	40,612	3.41 (#7)	0 / 90	0	Extra-parliamentary
2026 (Note: Run in a coalition with SG.)	Andrej Čuš	5,277	0.45 (#12)	0 / 90	0	Extra-parliamentary

=== European Parliament ===
Election	List leader	Votes	%	Seats	+/–	EP Group
2004 (Note: Run in a joint list with Youth Party.)	Alenka Paulin	10,027	2.30 (#8)	0 / 7	New	–
2009	Vlado Čuš	3,382	0.73 (#10)	0 / 7	0	–
2014	Vlado Čuš	3,273	0.82 (#15)	0 / 7	0	–
2019	Gorazd Pretnar	10,706	2.22 (#9)	0 / 8	0	–
2024	Klemen Grošelj	10,865	1.61 (#10)	0 / 9	0	–

== See also ==
- Youth Party – European Greens
