= Slovene Christian Democrats =

Slovene Christian Democrats Slovenski krščanski demokrati
- President: Lojze Peterle
- Founded: March 1989
- Dissolved: 15 April 2000
- Merged into: Slovenian People's Party
- Ideology: Christian democracy

The Slovene Christian Democrats (Slovene: Slovenski krščanski demokrati, SKD) was a Christian-democratic political party in Slovenia between 1989 and 2000.

It was founded as the Slovene Christian Social Movement in March 1989. Its first president was Peter Kovačič Peršin. On 2 November of the same year, it was renamed to the Slovene Christian Democrats, and Lojze Peterle was elected as its president.

Between 1990 and 1992, it was the largest party within the DEMOS coalition. Between 1992 and 1996, it formed a grand coalition with the Liberal Democracy of Slovenia, and its members were ministers in Janez Drnovšek's second cabinet. Between 1996 and 2000, it stayed in opposition. In 2000, it merged with the Slovenian People's Party. Soon afterwards, however, several prominent former members of the Christian Democrats, including Lojze Peterle and the Prime Minister Andrej Bajuk, left the Slovene People's Party, and formed New Slovenia - Christian People's Party.

The Slovene Christian Democrats were the official legal heir of the historical Slovene People's Party, the most important political party in the Slovene lands between 1907 and 1941.

Parliamentary representation:

== See also ==
- Slovene People's Party (historical)
- National Democratic Party (Slovenia)
