= Youth Party – European Greens =

Youth Party – European Greens Stranka mladih – Zeleni Evrope
- Leader: Igor Jurišič
- Founded: 4 July 2000
- Headquarters: Rimska cesta 8, 1000 Ljubljana
- Ideology: Youth politics Green politics Social liberalism
- Political position: Centre-left
- European affiliation: none (European Green Party until 2024)
- International affiliation: Global Greens
- Colours: Green
- National Assembly: 0 / 90
- European Parliament: 0 / 9

Website
- sms.si

The Youth Party – European Greens (Slovene: Stranka mladih – Zeleni Evrope, SMS-Zeleni) is a green political party in Slovenia. It is led by Igor Jurišič. Until July 2009, it was called Youth Party of Slovenia (Stranka mladih Slovenije, SMS).

At the early 2011 Slovenian parliamentary election on 4 December 2011, the party won 0.86% of the vote, thus not gaining any seat in the National Assembly. In the 2008 election, the Youth Party ran a joint list with the Slovenian People's Party. The joint list secured five seats on 5.2% of the vote. At the parliamentary elections on 3 October 2004, the party won 2.1% of the popular vote and no seats. At the 2000 elections, the party won 4.34% of the vote and four seats.

Established 4 July 2000, by those dissatisfied with the political situation at the time, the Youth Party of Slovenia sought to regenerate politics within the country. Traditionally, the youth in Slovenia have been unresponsive to political issues and though the party strongly encourages young people to get involved it considers itself a party for anyone who desires a fresh and spirited approach to politics in Slovenia.

The party was a member of the European Green Party, but in December 2024, the Congress of the European Green Party voted to exclude the party from its community.

== Electoral results ==
=== National Assembly ===
Parliamentary representation:

Election	Votes	%	Seats	+/–	Government
2000	46,674	4.34 (#8)	4 / 90	new	Opposition
2004	20,174	2.08 (#9)	0 / 90	▼4	Extra-parliamentary
2008 (Note: Run in a joint list with Slovenian People's Party.)	54,809	5.21 (#11)	5 / 90	▲5	Opposition
2011 (Note: Run in a joint list with Democratic Party of Slovenia, Green Coalition and New Social Democracy.)	9,532	0.86 (#10)	0 / 90	▼5	Extra-parliamentary
2014	did not run		0 / 90	0	Extra-parliamentary
2018	endorsed Pirate Party		0 / 90	0	Extra-parliamentary
2022	endorsed Social Democrats		0 / 90	0	Extra-parliamentary

=== Presidential ===
Election	Candidate	1st round		2nd round		Result
Election	Candidate	Votes	%	Votes	%	Result
2022 (Note: In coalition with Pirate Party)	Nataša Pirc Musar	234,361	26.88	483,812	53.89	Won

== See also ==
- Green party
- Green politics
- List of environmental organizations
