= Social Democrats (Slovenia) =

Centre-left political party in Slovenia

Social Democrats Socialni demokrati
- Abbreviation: SD
- Leader: Matjaž Han
- Founder: Ciril Ribičič
- Founded: 2 April 1990
- Preceded by: ZKS
- Headquarters: Ljubljana
- Youth wing: Youth Forum of Social Democrats
- Membership (2013): 12,109
- Ideology: Social democracy
- Political position: Centre-left
- European affiliation: Party of European Socialists
- European Parliament group: Progressive Alliance of Socialists and Democrats
- International affiliation: Progressive Alliance
- Colors: Red
- National Assembly: 6 / 90
- European Parliament: 1 / 9
- Mayors: 8 / 212
- Municipal council: 271 / 2,750

Party flag

Website
- socialnidemokrati.si

The Social Democrats (Slovene: Socialni demokrati, SD) is a centre-left social democratic political party in Slovenia. Led by Matjaž Han, the party was known as the United List of Social Democrats (Slovene: ZLSD - Združena lista socialnih demokratov [zələsəˈdə́]) from 1993 until 2005. It is the successor of the League of Communists of Slovenia. As of 2026, the party is in opposition to Janez Janša's government.

== History ==
=== Origins (1989–1992) ===
The origins of the modern-day party date from the end of 1989, when the League of Communists of Slovenia decided to renounce its absolute monopoly over political, social and economic life in the Socialist Republic of Slovenia, and agreed to introduce a system of political pluralism. On 23 January 1990, the Slovenian Communists left the League of Communists of Yugoslavia and on 4 February 1990 renamed themselves to League of Communists of Slovenia-Party of Democratic Renewal (Zveza komunistov Slovenije-Stranka demokratične prenove, ZKS-SDP). Former prominent Communist politician Ciril Ribičič was elected as the party's new president. The party lost against the Democratic Opposition of Slovenia (DEMOS) centre-right coalition at the first democratic elections in Slovenia in April 1990, gaining 17.3% of the popular vote. They nevertheless became the single largest party in Slovenia.

Between 1990 and 1992, the party, which eventually became known solely as the Party of Democratic Renewal, remained in opposition against the centre-right coalition government of Lojze Peterle. After the fall of Peterle's cabinet in 1992, the party entered the first coalition government of Janez Drnovšek, formed by the left wing of the dissolved DEMOS coalition (the Social Democratic Party of Slovenia, the Democratic Party of Slovenia and the Greens of Slovenia). The same year, the party was renamed to Social Democratic Renewal (Socialdemokratska prenova), maintaining the same acronym, SDP.

=== Constitution of the United List (1992–1996) ===
Prior to the 1992 general election intensive discussions were held and agreements reached between left-oriented political parties and groups on an electoral coalition. Thus just prior the parliamentary election of 1992, an agreement was reached between the Social Democratic Renewal (SDP) and three smaller extra-parliamentary centre-left and left-wing parties (the Social Democratic Union, the Workers' Party of Slovenia and the Democratic Party of Pensioners of Slovenia) to form an electoral coalition under the name United List. The newly formed coalition gained 13.6% of the popular vote, thus becoming the third political force in the country, after Liberal Democracy of Slovenia and the Slovene Christian Democrats. These three largest parties decided to form a government coalition, which soon became popularly known as the "grand coalition" (velika koalicija), under the leadership of Liberal Democrat Prime Minister Janez Drnovšek. Until March 1994, the Social Democratic Party of Slovenia also participated in this government coalition.

On 29 May 1993, a congress was held in Ljubljana at which the constitutive members of the United List decided to form a unified party. The new party was named the United List of Social Democrats and Janez Kocijančič was elected as its president. The party remained in government until January 1996, when it left the ruling coalition in disagreement over the government's social welfare policies. Furthermore, several prominent members exited the party and re-established Democratic Party of Pensioners of Slovenia. In the general elections of 1996, the United List of Social Democrats suffered a substantial loss support, gaining only around 9% of the popular vote.

=== Pahor era (1996–2012) ===
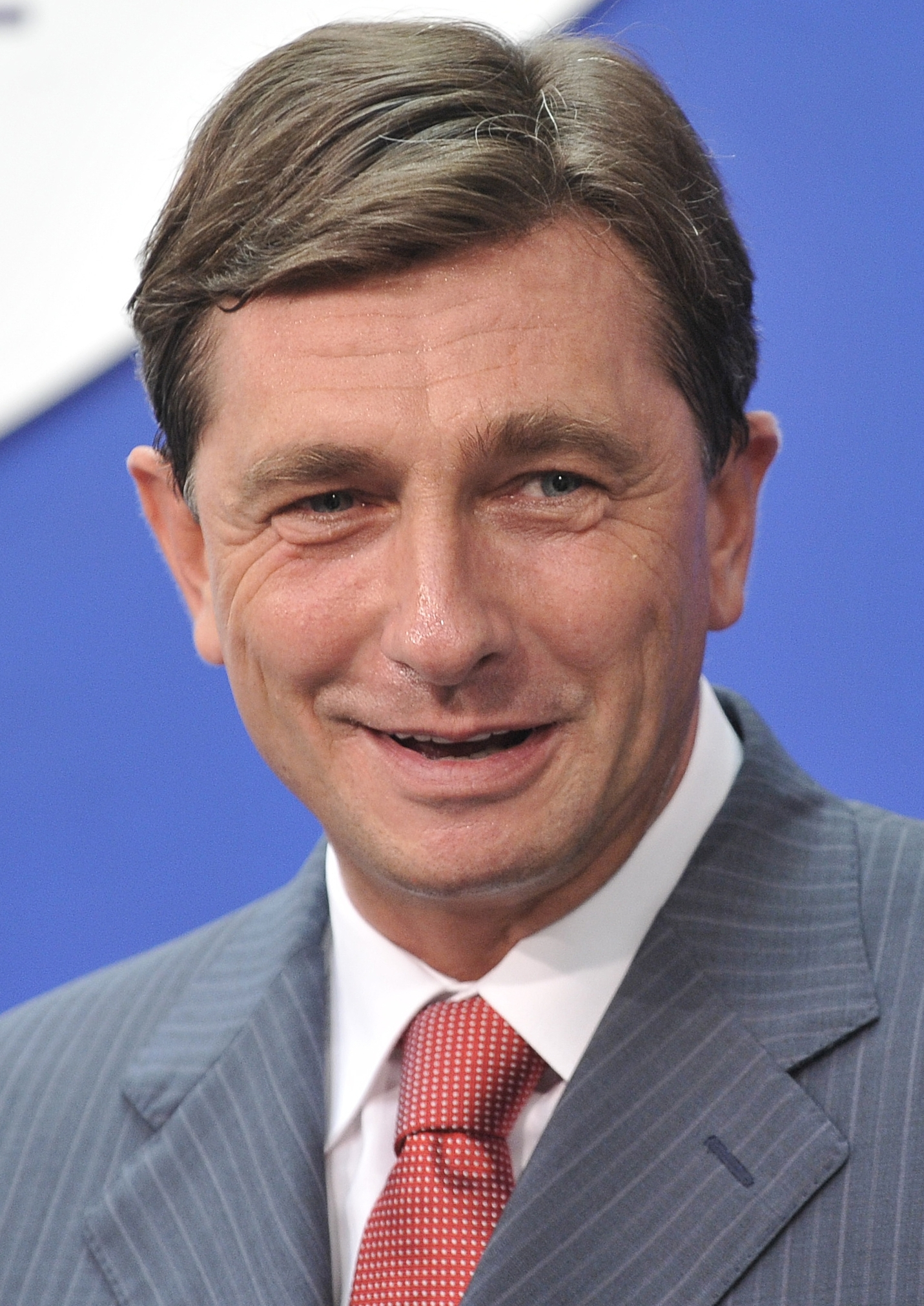
Borut Pahor, party president between 1997 and 2012, served as Prime Minister of Slovenia from 2008 to 2012, as well as President of Slovenia from 2012 to 2022

In the period between 1996 and 2000, the party remained in opposition. On the third National Congress of the United List of Social Democrats in 1997 a new party president, Borut Pahor, was elected. A gradual evolution towards more moderate positions started. In the election of 2000, the party rose to 12% of the vote and entered the centre-left coalition government led by Janez Drnovšek, while the party's president Borut Pahor was elected chairman of the Slovenian National Assembly. In the general elections of 2004, the party gained around 10.2% of the vote and went into opposition against the centre-right government dominated by the Slovenian Democratic Party.

In the fifth party Congress held in 2005 in Ljubljana, the decision was taken to shorten the party name to the Social Democrats. Borut Pahor was confirmed as the party president, strengthening his positions against internal opposition from the left wing of the party. In the programmatic congress held in Nova Gorica in July 2006, the party clearly distanciated itself against its communist past, while its president publicly condemned the socialist regime in Slovenia and Yugoslavia established after World War II.

After the internal crisis in the Liberal Democracy of Slovenia (LDS) following the loss of election in 2004, which resulted in the split of the party, the Social Democrats emerged as the main centre-left opposition force against the centre-right government led by Janez Janša. In 2007, several prominent members of the Liberal Democracy of Slovenia, including former Prime Minister Anton Rop, left their party and joined the Social Democrats. Following these developments, the Social Democrats became the second largest parliamentary party in Slovenia, after the Slovenian Democratic Party.

In 2008, the Social Democrats signed a coalition agreement with the extra-parliamentary Christian Socialists of Slovenia, and decided to set up a common election list on the coming elections.

In September 2008, Social Democrats won the parliamentary election with 30.45%. The ruling Slovenian Democratic Party finished second with 29.26%. Social Democrats formed a new Slovenian government in coalition with Zares, DeSUS and LDS. They won 29 seats in the 90-member National Assembly, one of which was won by Andrej Magajna, the president of the Christian Socialists of Slovenia. In October 2010, Andrej Magajna left the deputy group of Social Democrats due to differences of opinion with the rest of the group. He especially criticised the party leader Borut Pahor and the Minister of Economic Development Mitja Gaspari, claiming that he had been threatened with "removal" for not having supported the new act on the public broadcaster RTV Slovenija. After Magajna's break with the party, the SD parliamentary group was left with 28 MPs.

SD won 10.5% of the vote at the early 2011 Slovenian parliamentary election on 4 December 2011, gaining 10 seats in the National Assembly. SD were therefore in third place behind the SDS and new centre-left party Positive Slovenia (PS). SDS leader Janez Janša became Prime Minister for a second time on 10 February 2012 heading a centre-right coalition government.

=== Lukšič era (2012–2014) ===
In June 2012, Pahor unsuccessfully ran for re-election as president of the Social Democrats. He was defeated by Igor Lukšič by a narrow margin.

However, on 20 March 2013 Janša's coalition was replaced by a new government headed by PS interim leader Alenka Bratušek, a comprising PS, the Social Democrats, Civic List and DeSUS. Bratušek resigned as Prime Minister on 3 May 2014 seeking an early general election.

After the party won only one MEP seat and 8.0% of the vote in 2014 European Parliament election, Lukšič resigned as SD party president on 26 May.

The party received 5.95% of the vote in the Slovenian parliamentary election on 13 July 2014, and won 6 seats in parliament. On 18 September 2014, the Social Democrats joined the cabinet of Miro Cerar, also comprising Prime Minister Cerar's Modern Centre Party (SMC) and DeSUS.

=== Židan leadership (2014–2020) ===
SD scored badly at the 2014 European election, only obtaining 8,08% of votes and one seat. Following the result, Lukšič resigned and Dejan Židan was elected as new leader of the party.

The party improved its result in the 2018 parliamentary election, scoring 9,9% of votes and winning ten seats in the National Assembly. The Social Democrats later joined Marjan Šarec's government and held the posts of Minister of Justice and Minister of Culture until the dissolution of government in January 2020 by Marjan Šarec.

== Youth Forum ==
The Youth Forum of Social Democrats (Slovene: Mladi forum Socialnih demokratov) is Slovenian youth political organization that acts as the youth wing of the Social Democrats (SD) party. It was founded on 3 March 1990. It is one of the oldest democratic political organisations for young people in independent Slovenia. The organisation brings together young people aged 15 to 32. The youth wing operates in the form of autonomous local committees, which are represented in all Slovenian regions. It is organised into 61 local clubs, divided into 14 regions. The Youth Forum is a founding member of the National Youth Council of Slovenia and is affiliated with the Young European Socialists (YES) and the International Union of Socialist Youth (IUSY).

== International affiliations ==
The United List of Social Democrats became full member party of Socialist International at the organisation's 20th Congress in September 1996 in New York City. Since 16 May 2003, the Social Democrats have been a full member party of the Party of European Socialists (PES). SD party representatives were present at the foundation of the Progressive Alliance on 22 May 2013. SD was delisted from the Socialist International in December 2014 for not paying membership fees.

== Election results ==
=== National Assembly ===
Election	Leader	Votes	%	Seats	+/–	Government
1990	Ciril Ribičič	186,928	17.28 (#1)	14 / 80	▲14	Opposition
1992	Ciril Ribičič	161,349	13.58 (#3)	14 / 90	Steady	Coalition
1996	Janez Kocijančič	96,597	9.03 (#5)	9 / 90	▼5	Opposition
2000	Borut Pahor	130,079	12.08 (#3)	11 / 90	▲2	Coalition
2004	Borut Pahor	98,527	10.17 (#3)	10 / 90	▼1	Opposition
2008	Borut Pahor	320,248	30.45 (#1)	29 / 90	▲19	Coalition
2011	Borut Pahor	115,952	10.52 (#3)	10 / 90	▼19	Opposition, 2012–13
2011	Borut Pahor	115,952	10.52 (#3)	10 / 90	▼19	Coalition, 2013–14
2014	Dejan Židan	52,249	5.98 (#4)	6 / 90	▼4	Coalition
2018	Dejan Židan	88,524	9.93 (#3)	10 / 90	▲4	Coalition, 2018–20
2018	Dejan Židan	88,524	9.93 (#3)	10 / 90	▲4	Opposition, 2020–22
2022	Tanja Fajon	79,709	6.69 (#4)	7 / 90	▼3	Coalition
2026	Matjaž Han	79,175	6.71 (#4)	6 / 90	▼1	Opposition

=== European Parliament ===
Election	List leader	Votes	%	Seats	+/–	EP Group
2004	Borut Pahor	61,672	14.15 (#4)	1 / 7	New	PES
2009	Zoran Thaler	85,407	18.43 (#2)	2 / 8	▲1	S&D
2014	Igor Lukšič	32,484	8.08 (#5)	1 / 8	▼1	S&D
2019	Tanja Fajon	89,936	18.66 (#2)	2 / 8	▲1	S&D
2024	Matjaž Nemec	51,783	7.77 (#4)	1 / 9	▼1	S&D

=== Presidential ===
Election	Candidate	1st round		2nd round		Result
Election	Candidate	Votes	%	Votes	%	Result
1990	Milan Kučan	538,278	44.43	657,196	58.59	Won
1992	Milan Kučan^{[a]}	795,012	63.93			Won
1997	Milan Kučan^{[a]}	578,925	55.54			Won
2002	Lev Kreft	25,715	2.25			Lost
2007	Danilo Türk^{[a]}	241,349	24.47	677,333	68.03	Won
2012	Borut Pahor	325,406	39.93	474,309	67.44	Won
2017	Borut Pahor^{[a]}	355,117	47.21	375,106	52.98	Won
2022 (Note: In coalition with Freedom Movement)	Milan Brglez	134,726	15.45			Lost

^{a} Independent candidate, support

== Party leadership ==
- Ciril Ribičič, 1990–1993
- Peter Bekeš, 1993
- Janez Kocijančič, 1993–1997
- Borut Pahor, 1997–2012
- Igor Lukšič, 2012–2014
- Dejan Židan, 2014–2020
- Tanja Fajon, 2020–2024
- Matjaž Han, 2024–
