= Liberal Democracy of Slovenia =

Liberal Democracy of Slovenia Liberalna demokracija Slovenije
- Leader: Tone Anderlič
- Founded: 12 March 1994
- Merger of: Liberal Democratic Party; Democratic Party; Socialist Party of Slovenia; Greens – Ecological Social Party
- Headquarters: Ljubljana
- Youth wing: Young Liberal Democracy
- Ideology: Liberalism; Social liberalism Pro-Europeanism
- Political position: Centre to centre-left
- European affiliation: Alliance of Liberals and Democrats for Europe Party (formerly)
- European Parliament group: ALDE Group (2004–2014)
- International affiliation: Liberal International (formerly)
- Colours: Light blue
- National Assembly: 0 / 90
- European Parliament: 0 / 9
- Municipal council: 4 / 2,750

Website
- lds.si

Liberal Democracy of Slovenia (Slovene: Liberalna demokracija Slovenije, LDS) is a social-liberal political party in Slovenia. Between 1992 and 2004, it (and its main predecessor, the Liberal Democratic Party) was the largest and ruling party in the country. In the 2011 Slovenian parliamentary election, it failed to win entry to the Slovenian National Assembly. The party was a member of the Liberal International and the Alliance of Liberals and Democrats for Europe.

The LDS dominated Slovenian politics during the first decade following independence. Except for a brief interruption in 2000, it held the parliamentary majority between 1994 and 2004, when it lost the election to the conservative Slovenian Democratic Party. The loss was followed by decline, infighting and political fragmentation. In the runup to the 2008 parliamentary election the LDS joined in an unofficial coalition with the Social Democrats and Zares, but lost nearly 80% of its seats, dropping from 23 to just 5 and becoming the smallest parliamentary party. In the 2011 parliamentary election on 4 December 2011, its support collapsed even further: it won only 1.48% of the vote, not reaching the parliamentary threshold of 4%. It has not regained seats in parliament or a place as a major political force since, only retaining minor relevance at a local level in some municipalities.

== History ==
In 1990, the well-known Slovenian sociologist, philosopher and cultural critic Slavoj Žižek was the candidate for the Presidency of Slovenia (an auxiliary body of the President of the Republic, abolished in 1992) for one of the LDS' predecessor parties, the Union of Socialist Youth of Slovenia – Liberal Party (later the Liberal Democratic Party).

The LDS formed a part of governing coalitions of Slovenia from 1992 to 2004, with an interruption for a few months in 2000. The first Prime Minister of Slovenia from LDS was Janez Drnovšek, who later became the President of Slovenia in 2002 and was succeeded by Anton Rop, former Finance Minister.

At the 2004 European election, LDS won 21.9% of the vote, which yielded two seats in the European Parliament out of Slovenia's allocation of seven. At the 2004 elections, the LDS party suffered a considerable loss of votes. The Slovenian Democratic Party became the largest party, and the LDS went into opposition. The party held 23 seats (22.8% votes) in the National Assembly until 2007, when 12 members resigned from the party.

Following the defeat of 2004, the party suffered a succession of severe internal crises and a steady exodus of prominent members. In 2005, Anton Rop resigned as president and was succeeded by Jelko Kacin. Two years later, a group led by Matej Lahovnik and the former Secretary General of the party Gregor Golobič left the LDS and founded a new social liberal political party called Zares, while several other prominent members left for the Social Democrats, including the former Prime Minister Anton Rop. Following these events, Jelko Kacin resigned as President and was succeeded by Katarina Kresal. Following Kresal's election as president, several other prominent members, including former Health Minister Dušan Keber, decided to leave the party as well.

In 2008, the party won 5,3% of the votes and five seats, entering the centre-left coalition of Social Democrat Borut Pahor, with two ministers in the government. In the snap elections of 2011, the party failed to enter the Parliament. Due to financial difficulties, the party did not field a slate of candidates in the 2014 (or any subsequent) parliamentary elections. It has not, however, dissolved or merged with another party. In the 2022 Slovenian Presidential Elections, the LDS endorsed Ivo Vajgl, a former member. As of that year, the only offices it still held were the mayoralty and four municipal council seats in the small municipality of Markovci near Ptuj.

== Prominent members ==
Presidents

- Jožef Školč (1990−1992)
- Janez Drnovšek (1992−2002)
- Anton Rop (2002−2005)
- Jelko Kacin (2005−2007)
- Katarina Kresal (2007−2011)
- Iztok Podbregar (2012−2013)
- Tone Anderlič (2013−Present)

Other prominent members

- Mojca Drčar Murko
- Jože Pirjevec

Other prominent former members

- Igor Bavčar
- Alenka Bratušek
- Jože Dežman
- Gregor Golobič
- Dimitrij Rupel
- Ivo Vajgl
- Slavko Ziherl
- Slavoj Žižek
- Robert Golob

== Electoral results ==
=== Parliament ===
Election	Votes	%	Seats	+/–	Position	Government
1990	156,843	14.5	12 / 80	+12	2nd	Opposition
1992	278,851	23.5	22 / 90	+10	1st	Coalition
1996	278,883	27.0	25 / 90	+3	1st	Coalition
2000	390,306	36.3	34 / 90	+9	1st	Coalition
2004	220,848	22.8	23 / 90	-11	2nd	Opposition
2008	54,771	5.2	5 / 90	-18	7th	Coalition
2011	16,268	1.5	0 / 90	-5	9th	Extraparliamentary

== See also ==
- List of liberal parties
- Liberalism in Slovenia
