= 2012 Slovenian presidential election =

- 11 November 2012 (first round); 2 December 2012 (second round)
- Turnout: 48.41% (first round); 42.40% (second round)
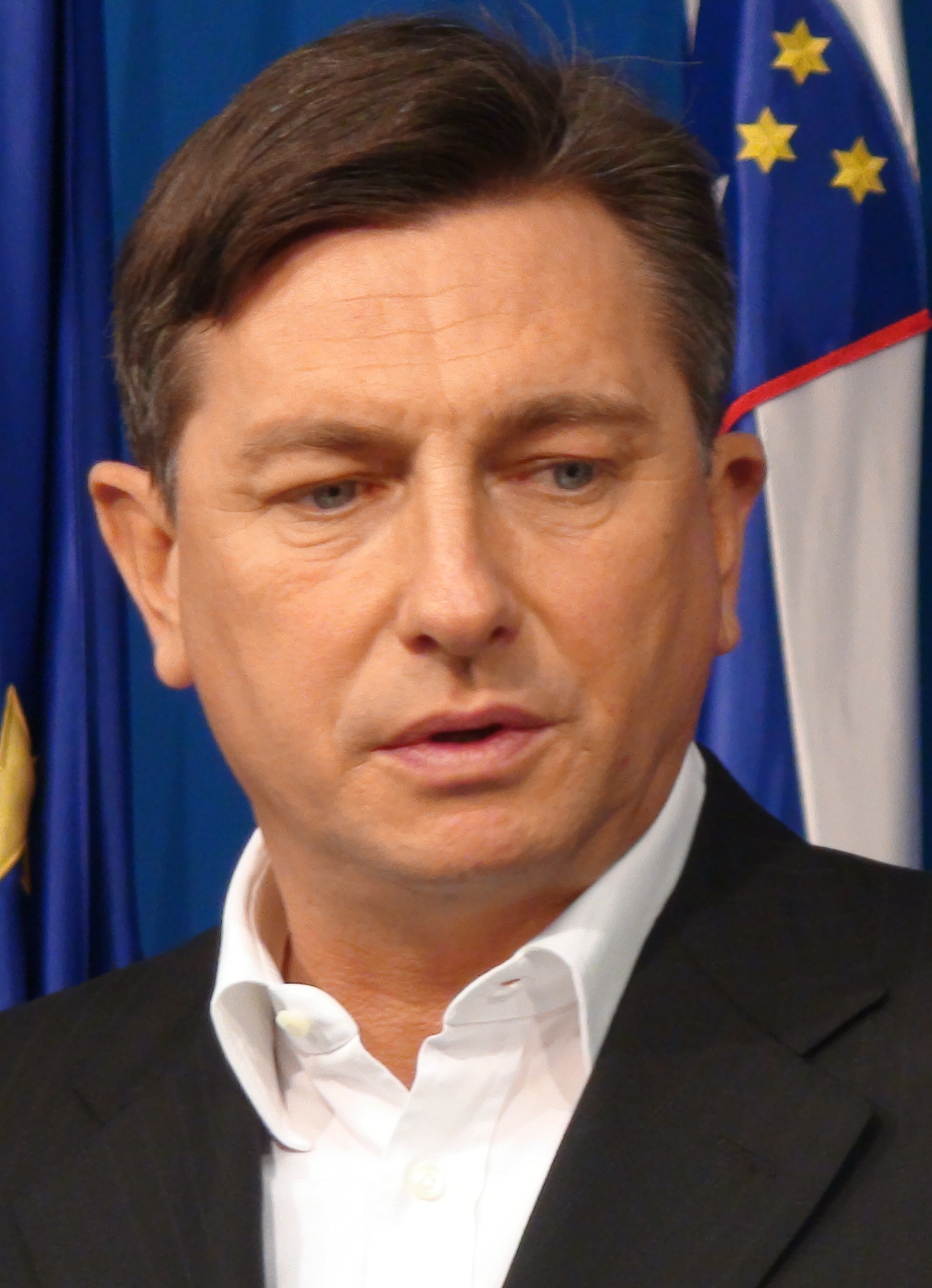

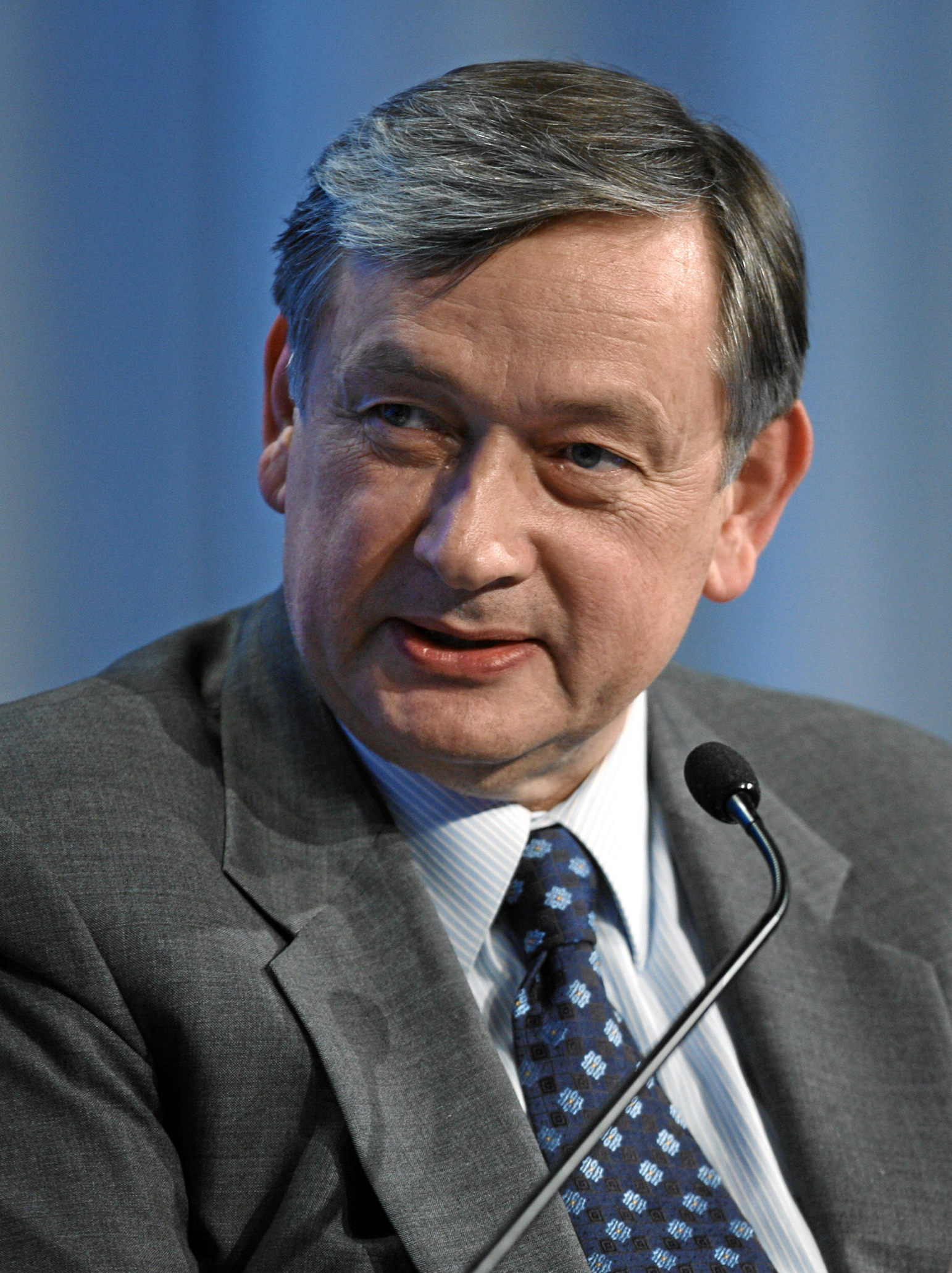
Nominee	Borut Pahor	Danilo Türk
Party	SD	Independent
Popular vote	478,859	231,971
Percentage	67.37%	32.63%
- Pahor: 30–40% 40–50% 50–60% 60–70% 70–80% 80–90% Türk: 30–40% 40–50% 50–60% Zver: 30–40% 40–50%
President before election
Danilo Türk
Independent
Elected President
Borut Pahor
SD

Presidential elections were held in Slovenia on 11 November 2012, with a run-off held on 2 December. Slovenia's 1.7 million registered voters chose between the incumbent president Danilo Türk, the SDS/NSi party candidate Milan Zver and Borut Pahor of the Social Democrats who was also supported by the Civic List. The first round was won, contrary to the opinion poll predictions, by Pahor, with Türk placing second. In the run-off election, Pahor won with roughly two-thirds of the vote.

== Electoral system ==
Under Slovenia's election law, candidates for president require support of either:

- 10 members of the National Assembly,
- one or more political parties and either 3 members of the National Assembly or 3,000 voters,
- or 5,000 voters.

Each political party can support only one candidate. In the election, the president is elected with a majority of the vote. If no candidate receives more than half of votes, the top two candidates meet in the second round of election.

== Candidates ==
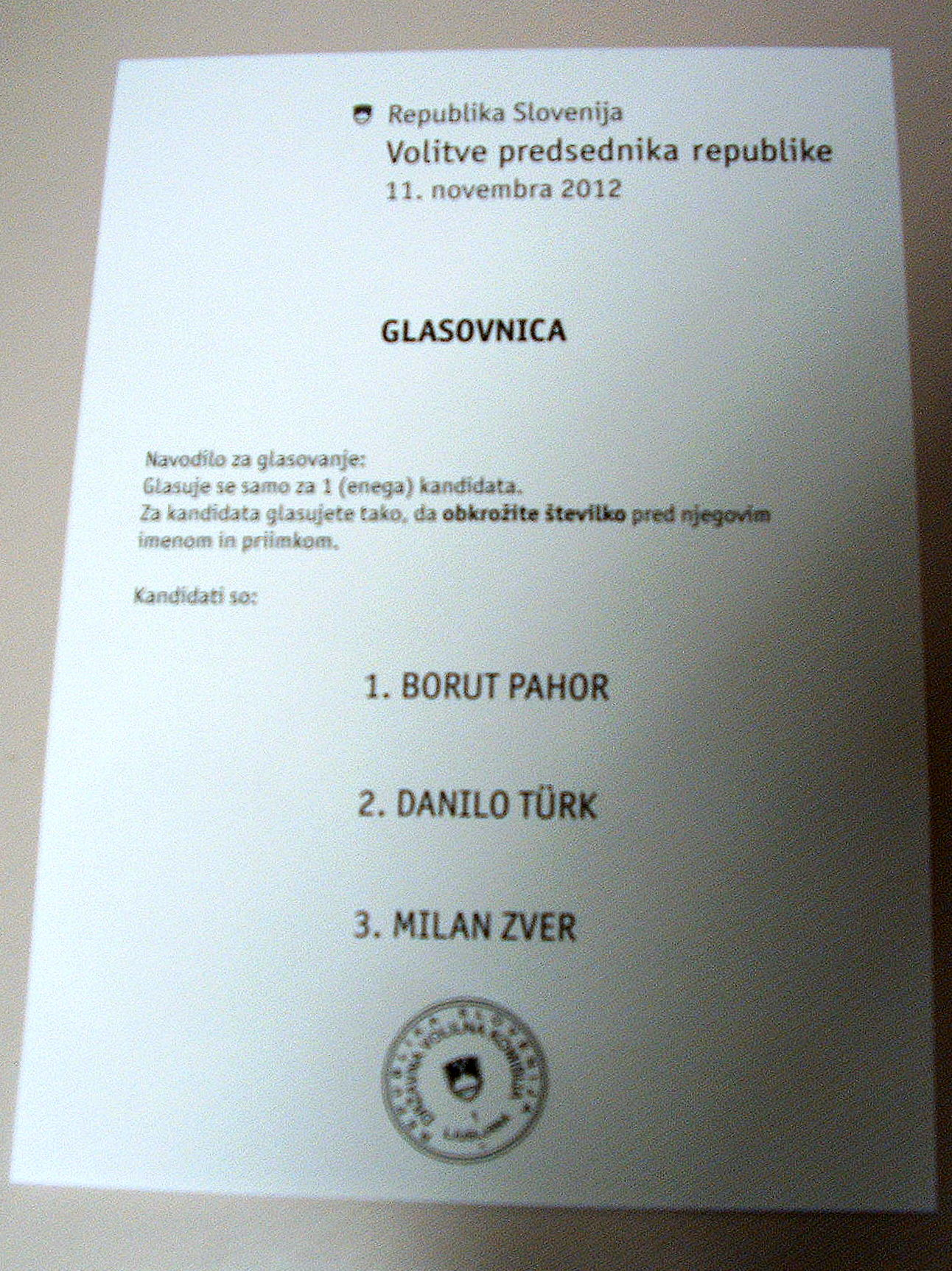
Ballot paper in the first round of voting. The sequence of candidate options was determined via lottery.

=== Danilo Türk ===
Danilo Türk, the incumbent president, announced that he would seek re-election for a second term as an independent candidate and submitted over 13,000 signatures of support to the election commission. Türk, a former United Nations diplomat and professor at the Faculty of Law of the University of Ljubljana, entered the 2007 election as an independent candidate with the support of five political parties. Narrowly placing second in the first round, Türk won the second round in a landslide, defeating Lojze Peterle.

Türk was supported by two parliamentary parties, Positive Slovenia and Democratic Party of Pensioners of Slovenia, and four non-parliamentary parties, Liberal Democracy of Slovenia, Democratic Labour Party, Party for Sustainable Development, and Zares.

=== Borut Pahor ===
Borut Pahor of the Social Democrats had already considered running for the office in the 2007 election. However, he instead decided to concentrate on the then upcoming parliamentary election where his party won and he was elected Prime Minister. In September 2011, Pahor's government lost a confidence vote amidst an economic crisis and political tensions. In the following election, Pahor was elected to the National Assembly while his party lost the plurality of the votes. In June 2012, Pahor unsuccessfully ran for re-election as president of the Social Democrats. He was defeated by Igor Lukšič by a narrow margin. At the same party congress, Pahor announced he would run for President of Slovenia. He received support from the Social Democrats and also from the Civic List, a Conservative Liberal party in the Slovenian center-right government coalition. Pahor also submitted over 4.400 signatures of support. He also received open support by the right-wing leader Janez Janša, which according to the newspaper Delo was the turning point in the campaign, because Pahor won due to the support of right-wing voters.

=== Milan Zver ===
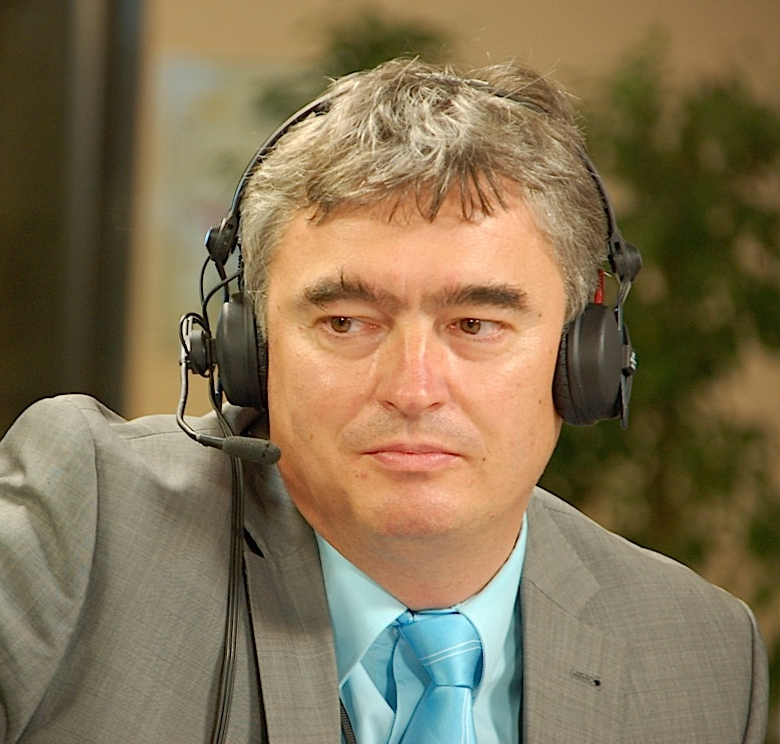
Milan Zver, SDS and NSi candidate

Milan Zver entered the election as a candidate of two coalition parties, Slovenian Democratic Party and Nova Slovenija. Zver, a sociologist and political scientist, served as the Minister for Education and Sports in the centre-right government led by Janez Janša in 2004–2008. In 2009, Zver was elected member of the European Parliament as a candidate of the Slovenian Democratic Party.

=== Failed or withdrawn ===
Zmago Jelinčič Plemeniti of the Slovenian National Party, who had run for office several times before, also suggested he would run, however, he later changed his decision. Monika Malešič, independent politician, also announced her candidacy. She later withdrew her candidacy due to lack of public support. Marko Kožar, independent politician, who attempted to run in 2002 and 2007 but failed to gather sufficient public support both times, announced his intention to run this year as well but later changed his mind. Other people who announced the intention to run include Miro Žitko, Ladislav Troha, Dušan Egidij Kubot - Totislo, Artur Štern, Martina Valenčič, Fani Eršte, and Milan Robič.

== Campaign ==
All three campaigns stated that their activities would be financially austere in accordance with the situation in the country. Each however, was marked by its own specific style. Pahor carried out a variety of voluntary jobs, and took part in a number of work actions organised by his campaign. Zver participated in numerous political and civil group rallies and similar events across the country. Türk organised a large political meeting in Križanke to inaugurate the campaign, but mostly appeared at presidential events rather than ones that were explicitly campaign oriented. An important part of the three campaigns were the live radio and television debates.

=== First Round Debates ===
The very first debate between the three candidates occurred on the afternoon of 23 October 2012 on Radio Slovenia. The first television debate took place in the evening of the same day on TV Slovenia. Samo Uhan, a politologist at the Faculty of Social Sciences of the University of Ljubljana, stated that the first TV debate would not case a shift in support. He described Türks' performance as presidential, Zvers' as an advocacy of the current governing coalition, and Pahor as being burdened by his negative experiences in the previous parliamentary term. Božidar Novak stated that none of the candidates were outstanding in regard to substance, but that Pahor was slightly better than the other two in terms of style. He described Türk as calm, Zver as condescending, and Pahor as likeable.

The second TV debate was organised and broadcast by POP TV on the evening of 25 October 2012. The broadcast featured a number of interactive elements including a live analysis of web based reactions to the three candidates. According to this method, Pahor performed the best, followed closely by Zver, with Türk shown as the least successful among the three.

The third televised live appearance of all three candidates was aired on POP TV on the evening of 2 November 2012. This broadcast had a different format. The candidates were interrogated by a journalist for 25 minutes each and only interacted with each other at the beginning of the show and between the interviews. The above-mentioned method of reaction analysis showed that both Pahor and Zver performed better than Türk.

The fourth TV debate aired on the newly opened Planet TV on the evening of 5 November 2012. During the live broadcast, Episcenter conducted a study of how convincing each of the candidates had been. The results showed that Pahor was successful at convincing 45% of the viewers, followed by Türk with 37% and Zver with 18%. The fifth one was again hosted by TV Slovenia on the evening of 6 November.

The final POP TV debate was broadcast live on the evening of 8 November 2012. Aside from the usual confrontation between the candidates for president it also featured a segment where the women who would become the first lady were questioned by the moderator. An analysis of web based responses indicated that Pahor made the best impression, followed by Türk and revealed Zver as the least convincing.

The final TV Slovenia debate was broadcast live on the evening of 9 November 2012. This event also featured a segment which included the companions of the three candidates.

Election silence came into effect at midnight on the night of 9 November 2012 and lasted until 19:00 CET on the evening of 11 November when the polling stations closed.

== Opinion polls ==
Date(s) conducted	Polling organisation/client, reference	Sample size	Danilo Türk	Borut Pahor	Milan Zver	Undecided, Not voting	Lead
27-29 Nov	Delo	786	24%	55%	-	21%	31%
26-28 Nov	Faculty for applied social studies/Slovene beat	903	17.2%	53.6%	-	29.1%	36.4%
24–27 Nov	Planet SiOL.net	927	28.9%	71.1%	-	-	42.2%
23–25 Nov	Planet SiOL.net	930	31%	69%	-	-	38%
20–22 Nov	Ninamedia/Dnevnik	700	31.6%	53.1%	-	15.3%	21.5%
12–20 Nov	Planet SiOL.net	526	31.9%	68.1%	-	-	36.2%
12–15 Nov	Delo	645	27%	62%	-	11%	35%
11 Nov	Milan Zver lost in the first round of the presidential election and therefore dropped out.						
5–8 Nov	Mediana Institute/RTV Slovenia	616	30%	25%	17%	28%	5%
5–8 Nov	Delo	621	44%	31%	25%	-	13%
5–7 Nov	Faculty for applied social studies/Slovene beat	916	28.5%	30.7%	14.2%	26.6%	2.2%
5–7 Nov	RM Plus/Večer	700	24.8%	21.4%	16.6%	37.2%	3.4%
5–7 Nov	Delo	817	33%	27%	18%	22%	6%
6 Nov	Ninamedia/Dnevnik	600	33.5%	25.5%	17%	24%	8%
26–30 Oct	Mediana Institute/RTV Slovenia	611	36%	24%	14%	26%	12%
24–25 Oct	Delo	407	43%	20%	13%	24%	23%
22–24 Oct	RM Plus/Večer	700	29%	16.6%	15%	39.4%	12.4%
16–18 Oct	Vox populi/Dnevnik, POP TV	700	51%	23%	20%	16%	28%
10–16 Oct	Episcenter/TSMedia	1005	46%	25%	21%	8%	21%
8–10 Oct	Delo	700	46%	24%	16%	14%	22%

=== Tracking polls ===
During the last two weeks of the campaign, magazine Mladina, in association with Ninamedia agency, was running a tracking poll to monitor the trends of changes in support for all three candidates. The poll included n=100 daily with n=200 on the last day of the poll. The final prediction of the poll on Friday, 9 November, indicated 43.8% for Türk, 33.6% for Pahor, and 22.6% for Zver, what would result in a second round being necessary. Support for Zver was more or less stable during the two weeks, slightly above 20%. Long-term trend indicated a slight fall of support for Türk with the support beginning to rise again in the last days before the election. While the poll first allowed the possibility of Türk being elected in the first round already, the final prediction stated that Türk and Pahor will face the second round.

Journal Delo ran a tracking poll during the last week of the campaign. Similarly, the final prediction indicated 44% for Türk, 33% for Pahor and 23% for Zver. In the last two days, the poll indicated that some of supporters of Türk migrated to Pahor.

== Results ==
Candidate	Party	First round		Second round	
Candidate	Party	Votes	%	Votes	%
Borut Pahor	Social Democrats	326,006	39.87	478,859	67.37
Danilo Türk	Independent	293,429	35.88	231,971	32.63
Milan Zver	SDS–NSi	198,337	24.25		
Total		817,772	100.00	710,830	100.00
Valid votes		817,772	98.69	710,830	97.95
Invalid/blank votes		10,852	1.31	14,870	2.05
Total votes		828,624	100.00	725,700	100.00
Registered voters/turnout		1,711,768	48.41	1,711,461	42.40
Source: DVK

=== First round ===
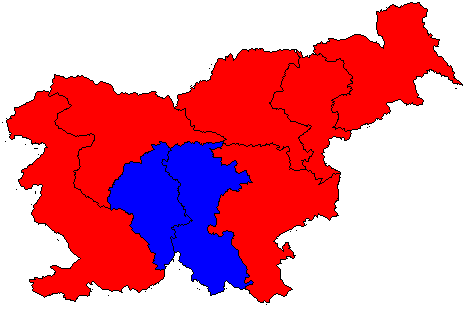
First round winners by electoral unit Borut Pahor (red) Danilo Türk (blue)

The first round took place on 11 November. Contrary to predictions, the exit polls indicated that the first round was won by Pahor (41.9%), followed by Türk (37.2%) and Zver (20.8%). After 99.91% of votes counted, Pahor got 40%, followed by Türk with 35.8% and Zver with 24.2%. The voter turnout was record-low at less than 48%. For comparison, the first round of the 2007 election saw 58% of the electorate casting their votes and the 1992 election even more than 85%.

In his first response, Pahor expressed a surprise by the amount of support in the first round and stated that he will aim to continue to be a candidate that is not limited to one side of the political spectrum. Türk mentioned that the low voter turnout indicated the disappointment of people regarding the political situation and that the voters should decide what country they want to live in. Zver thanked his supporters and stated he was "sad" but did not decide which of the remaining two candidates he would endorse in the second round.

In the following days, analysts expressed opinion that Pahor now has better chances in the runoff. Pahor appeared to attract votes from both sides of the political spectrum, even one third of the voters of the SDS party. On the other hand, Türk got most of his votes from supporters of Positive Slovenia and from one third of supporters of Pahor's SD. Increasing support of Pahor during the campaign was also attributed to better performance of his in televised debates. Discrepancies between the opinion polls and the results in the first round were attributed to low voter turnout, especially as a part of Türk's supporters presumably stayed at home. Low turnout was also interpreted as people being "fed up" with the political situation in Slovenia.

=== Second round ===
Borut Pahor won the second round and the election with 67.3% of the vote. The results were first announced in an exit poll by the Mediana Institute. The result was later confirmed at 67.4% for Pahor to 32.6% for Danilo Türk by the Electoral Commission of Slovenia, with 99.7% of the votes counted. The voter turnout was 41.95%, the lowest in the history of presidential elections in Slovenia (until being surpassed by the 2017 election at 41.84%).

After the results were announced, Pahor reiterated that this "only the beginning, the beginning of something new, a new hope, a new period." Pahor stressed that people need trust, respect, and tolerance. He stated he will keep the promises he made during the campaign and will keep working to help solving the problems the nation faces. Türk congratulated his opponent and stated he will keep an active role in the politics of the country.
