= List of members of the European Parliament for Slovenia, 2014–2019 =

This is a list of members of the European Parliament for the Slovenia in the 2014 to 2019 session.

See 2014 European Parliament election in Slovenia for further information on these elections in Slovenia.

== List ==
This table can be sorted by party or party group: click the symbol at the top of the appropriate column.

Name	National party	EP group
Franc Bogovič	New Slovenia (NS) - Slovenian People's Party (SLS)	EPP
Tanja Fajon	Social Democrats (SD)	S&D
Lojze Peterle	New Slovenia (NS) - Slovenian People's Party (SLS)	EPP
Romana Tomc	Slovenian Democratic Party (SDS)	EPP
Ivo Vajgl	Democratic Party of Pensioners (DeSUS)	ALDE
Milan Zver	Slovenian Democratic Party (SDS)	EPP
Igor Šoltes	Verjamem (V)	Greens/EFA
Patricija Šulin	Slovenian Democratic Party (SDS)	EPP
