= Tomaž Vesel =

Slovenian lawyer (born 1967)

President of the Court of Audit of Slovenia
- In office 24 April 2013 – 2 June 2022
- Preceded by: Igor Šoltes
- Succeeded by: Jana Ahčin

Vice President of the Court of Audit of Slovenia
- In office 22 February 2004 – 24 April 2013
- President: Igor Šoltes

Personal details
- Born: 30 June 1967 (age 59) Ljubljana, Yugoslavia
- Party: Independent
- Education: University of Ljubljana
- Occupation: Lawyer • Judge

Tomaž Vesel (born 30 June 1967) is a Slovenian lawyer who served as president of the Court of Audit from 2013 to 2022. He was previously vice president of the court from 2004 to 2013.

== Career ==
Vesel was appointed to the State Audit Commission by the National Assembly on 22 December 1999. He was elected first deputy president of the Court of Audit at the end of 2003. He served as first deputy president from 2004 to February 2013, and in April 2013 was nominated by president Borut Pahor to become president of the court, succeeding Igor Šoltes. He was elected to a 9-year term by the National Assembly against Nataša Prah, with 62 votes in favor and five against. In 2022 he was succeeded as president by Jana Ahčin.

In August 2016, Vesel was appointed chair of FIFA's independent audit committee, succeeding Domenico Scala.

In April 2024, he was announced as prime minister Robert Golob's candidate to be Slovenia's next European Commissioner. His candidacy received the support of the Freedom Movement and the Social Democrats. However, following pressure from President von der Leyen for Member States to nominate more women to the College of Commissioners, he dropped out as commissioner nominee. As similar situation happened with the Romanian nominee Victor Negrescu.
