= 2014 European Parliament election in Slovenia =

- 25 May 2014

All 8 Slovenian seats to the European Parliament
- Turnout: 24.55%
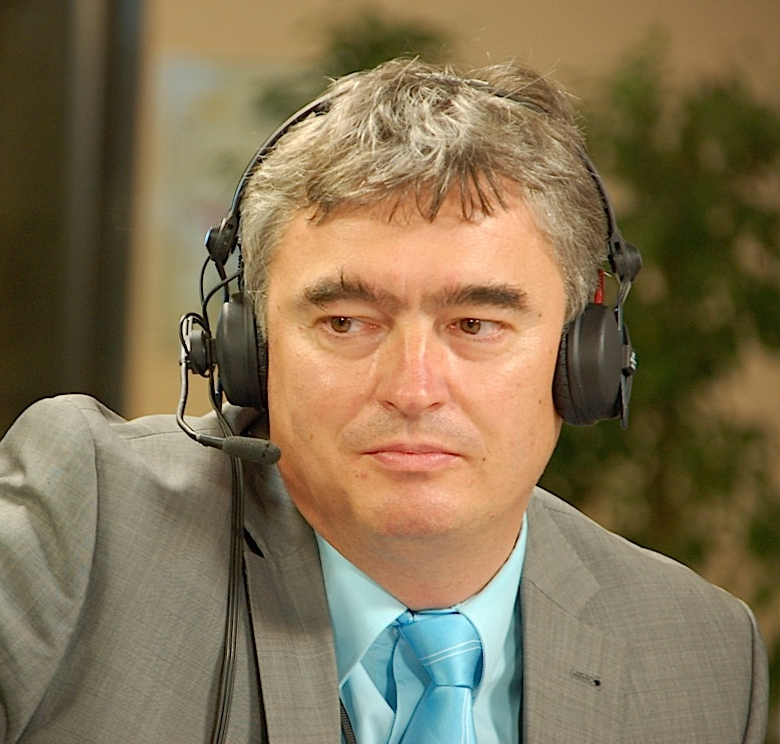

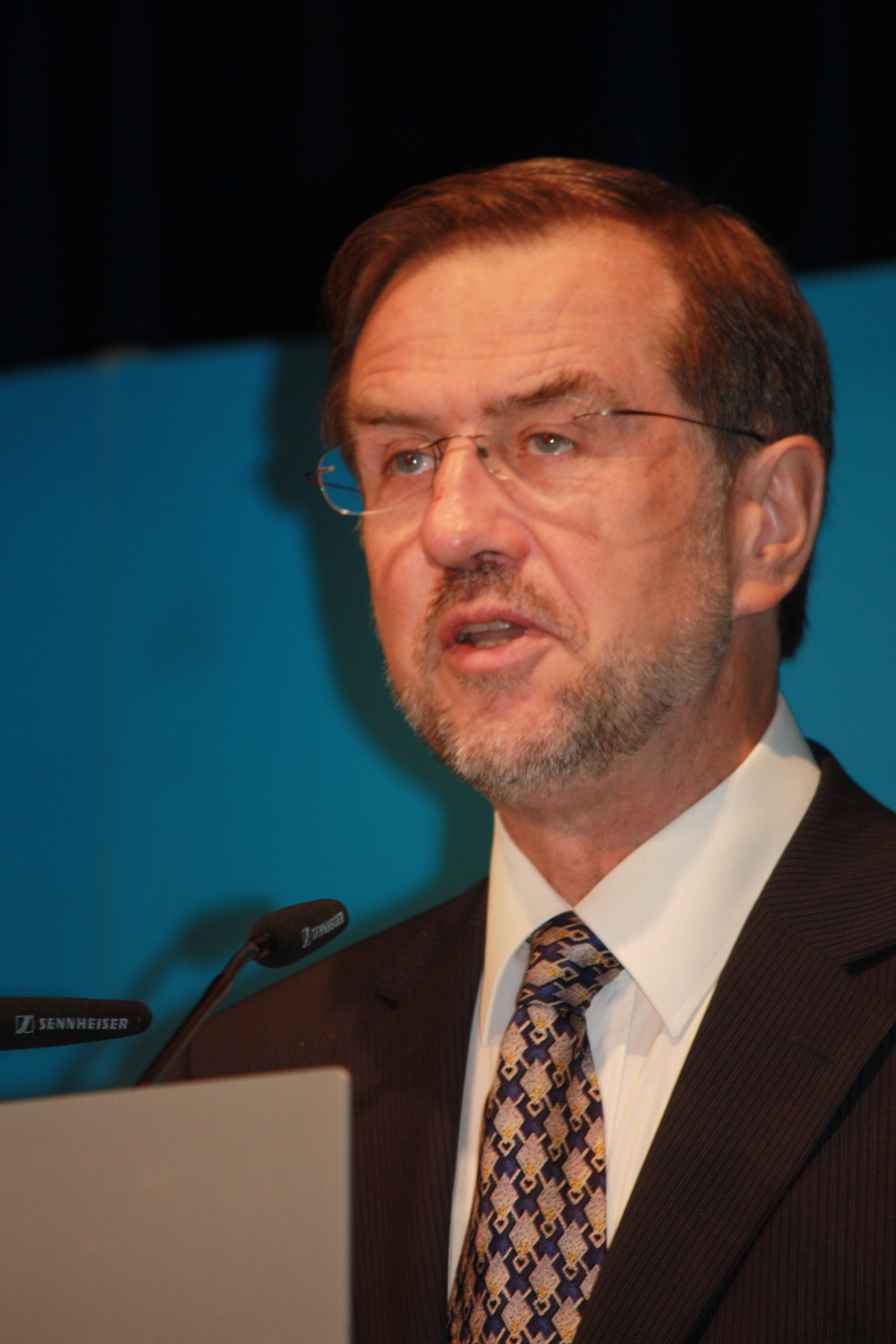

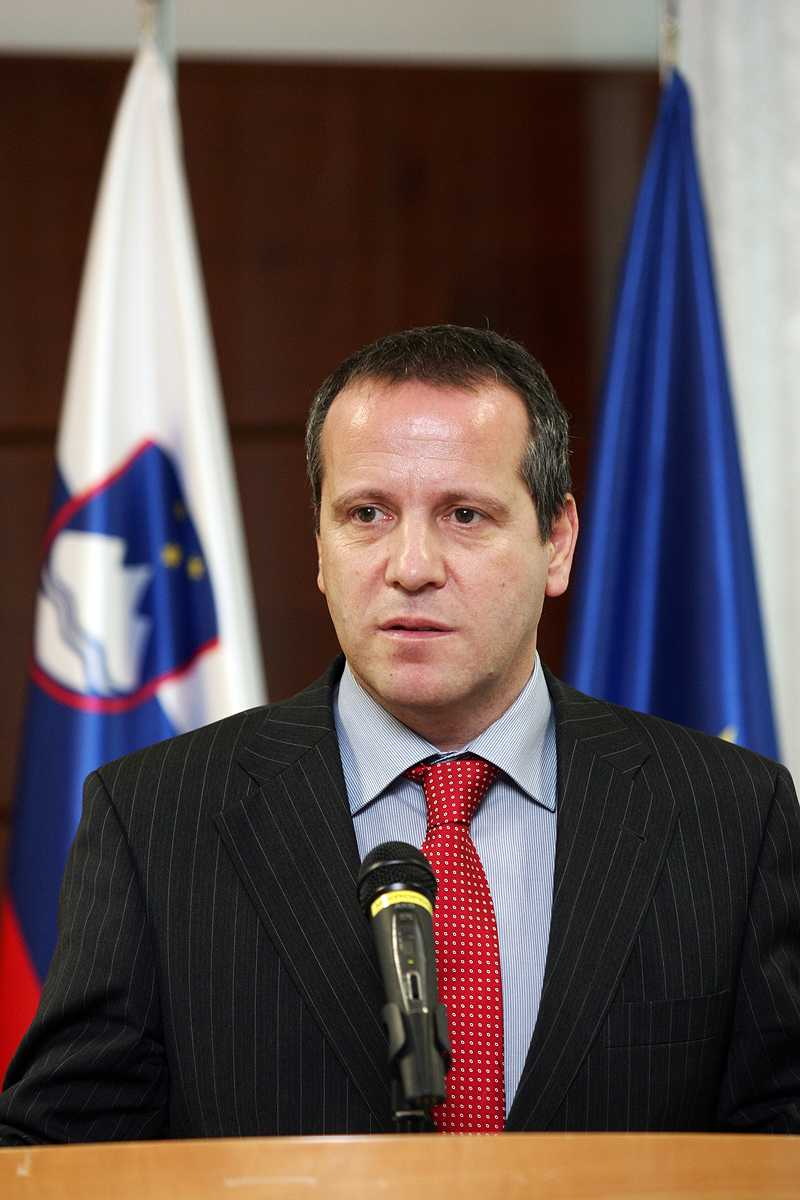

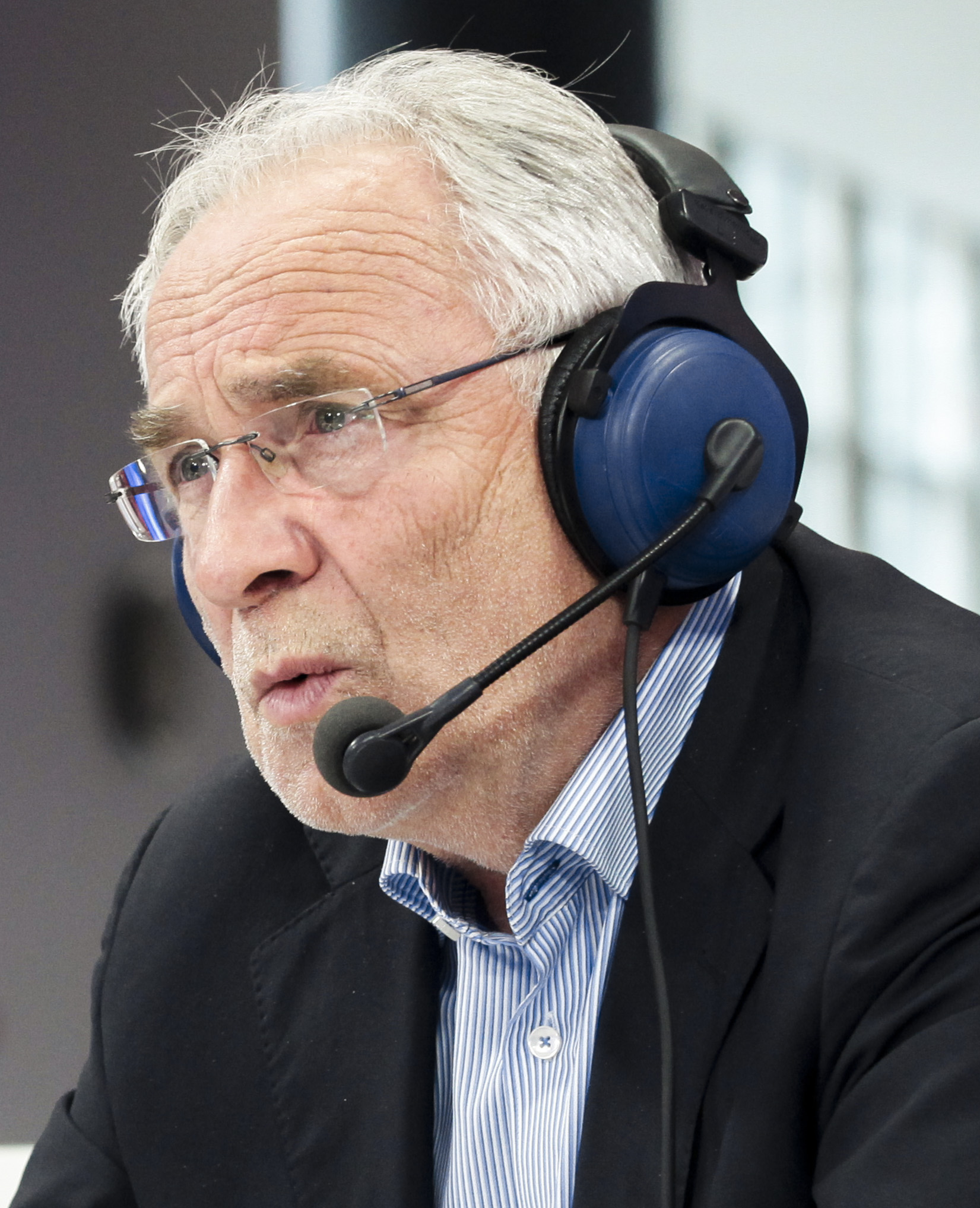

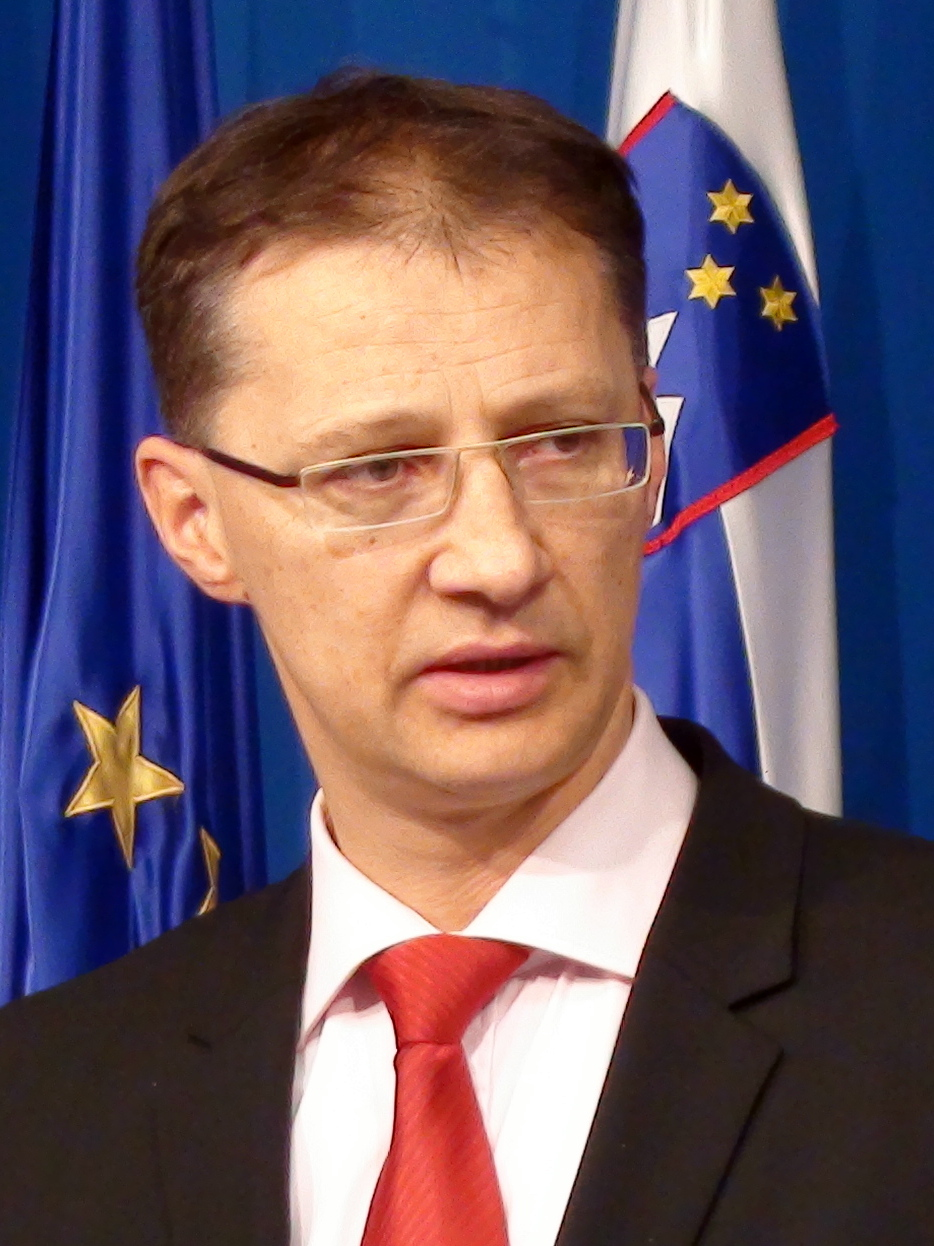
	First party	Second party	Third party
Leader	Milan Zver	Lojze Peterle	Igor Šoltes
Party	SDS	NSi–SLS	Verjamem
Alliance	EPP	EPP	Greens/EFA
Last election	26.66%	16.58%	New Party
Seats before	3	1	New Party
Seats after	3	2	1
Seat change	0	▲1	▲1
Popular vote	99.643	66.760	41.525
Percentage	24.78%	16.60%	10.33%
Swing	▼1.88%	▲0.02%	▲10.33%
	Fourth party	Fifth party
Leader	Ivo Vajgl	Igor Lukšič
Party	DeSUS	SD
Alliance	ALDE	PES
Last election	7.18%
Seats before	0	2
Seats after	1	1
Seat change	▲1	▼1
Popular vote	32.662	32.484
Percentage	8.12%	8.08%
Swing	▲3.78%	▼10.35 %

2014 European Parliament elections were held in Slovenia on 25 May 2014. It was the first in the series of three elections held in the 2014, and the major test leading up to the parliamentary elections in July. The political atmosphere was in a crisis that started with the fall of Borut Pahor's government, then Janez Janša's government in 2013, the latter coming after Janša was accused of corruption. The cabinet of Alenka Bratušek was breaking up, as the former leader of the Positive Slovenia Zoran Janković, who was under the suspicion of corruption, announced his candidature for party president, even though the coalition parties threatened to leave the government if he was to be elected, which later he was.

The main characteristic of the elections was the participation of several new parties, founded during the recent years of crisis. Verjamem was among the last parties to be founded before the elections, and surprisingly finished in third place, winning one seat in the European Parliament.

== Candidates ==
Political Party	Candidate	Candidate	Candidate	Candidate	Candidate	Candidate	Candidate	Candidate
Civic List (DL)	Senko Pličanič	Polonca Komar	Marko Pavlišič	Vesna Alaber	Milan Dubravac	Emina Hadžić	Monika Bračika	Miha Istenič
Democratic Party of Pensioners of Slovenia (DeSUS)	Ivo Vajgl	Marija Pukl	Izidor Salobir	Ingeborg Ivanek	Bojan Bratina	Jana Jenko	Anton Dragan	Marjana Kotnik Poropat
Kacin-Concretly	Jelko Kacin	Polona Sagadin	Dorijan Maršič	Faila Pašić Bišić	Andrej Lavtar	Tatjana Greif	Jure Pucko	Sara Karba
New Slovenia (NSi), Slovenian People's Party (SLS)	Lojze Peterle	Aleš Hojs	Monika Kirbiš Rojs	Neža Pavlič	Vida Čadonič Špelič	Jakob Presečnik	Ljudmila Novak	Franc Bogovič
Pirate Party (PS)	Rolando Benjamin Vaz Ferreira	/	/	/	/	/	/	/
Positive Slovenia (PS)	Jože Mencinger	Melita Župevc	Valerija Medic	Jarko Čehovin	Mirjam Bon Klanjšček	Marjan Sedmak	Britta Bilač	Peter Vilfan
Sanjska Služba	Uroš Uršič	David Breskvar	Barbara Ložar	Boštjan Novak	Ksenija Krenjak Kramar	Andreja Korade	Marko Korenjak	/
Slovenian Democratic Party (SDS)	Milan Zver	Romana Tomc	Patricija Šulin	Anže Logar	Damijan Terpin	Carmen Merčnik	Vlasta Krmelj	Andrej Šircelj
Slovenian Nation	Bogomil Knavs	Janica Millonig	Dušan Egidij Kubot Totislo	Ivica Kranjc	Miha Majc	Simona Drev	/	/
Slovenian National Party (SNS)	Zmago Jelinčič Plemeniti	Sergej Čas	Helena Rupar	Alenka Jelenovič	Jos Zalokar	Katarina Langus Šeligo	Jelena Miljković	Folko Puconja
Social Democrats (SD)	Igor Lukšič	Tanja Fajon	Mojca Kleva Kekuš	Anton Bebler	Marina Vovk	Matevž Frangež	Ljubica Jelušič	Patrick Vlačič
Solidarnost, za pravično družbo	Dušan Keber	Marjutka Hafner	Damjan Mandelc	Nataša Osolnik	Tjaša Učakar	Jože Pirjevec	Manca Uršič Rosas	Lenart Zajc
United Greens	Vlado Čuš	Barbara Cenič Kranjc	Martin Gorjanc	Nives Grlj	Marko Mitja Feguš	Tamara Galun	Franc Branko Vivod	Andreja Galinec
United Left (ZL)	Violeta Tomić	Dušan Plut	Luka Mesec	Jasminka Dedić	Janez Požar	Lara Jankovič	Branimir Štrukelj	Petra Rezar
Verjamem	Igor Šoltes	Katarina Košak	Boštjan Horvat	Mojca Blas	Iztok Prislan	Monja Režonja	Gregor Veličkov	Diana Ternav
Zares	Darja Radić	Andres Rus	Ivana Gornik	Vito Rožej	Simona Potočnik	Matic Smrekar	Cvetka Ribarič Lasnik	Pavel Gantar

== Opinion polls ==
Poll results are listed in the table below in reverse chronological order, showing the most recent first. The highest percentage figure in each polling survey is displayed in bold, and the background shaded in the leading party's colour. In the instance that there is a tie, then no figure is shaded. The lead column on the right shows the percentage-point difference between the two parties with the highest figures. Poll results use the date the survey's fieldwork was done, as opposed to the date of publication. However, if such date is unknown, the date of publication will be given instead.

Date	Polling Firm	PS	SDS	Verjamem	SD	DL	DeSUS	NSi + SLS	ZL (Note: As the sum of its constituent parties.)	Kacin	PP	SNS	Others	Lead
**25 May**	**Election Results**	**6.6**	**24.8**	**10.3**	**8.1**	**1.1**	**8.1**	**16.6**	**5.5**	**4.9**	**2.6**	**4.0**	**13.9**	**8.2**
20 May	Episcentra	7.0	**23.0**	13.0	10.0	1.0	6.0	18.0	5.0	6.0	2.0	4.0	5.0	5.0
13 May	Episcentra	7.0	**27.0**	11.0	8.0	1.0	5.0	19.0	4.0	7.0	2.0	4.0	5.0	8.0
9 May	Episcentra	7.0	**26.0**	9.0	10.0	2.0	5.0	20.0	3.0	7.0	2.0	5.0	4.0	6.0
5–7 May	Ninamedia	3.2	**22.1**	10.4	8.3	—	3.3	17.9	3.6	8.3	—	—	22.9	4.2
25 April	Ninamedia (Note: The survey listed only the percentage of the voters that were already decided for who are they going to vote on election day.)	4.5	**12.1**	6.8	3.5	0.1	3.7	10.3	1.7	3.5	—	3.2	—	1.8
12 April	Delo	4.6	**20.8**	8.7	4.4	2.3	4.5	11.5	3.0	6.2	—	12.1	21.9	8.7
10 March	Ninamedia	**16.9**	15.3	– (Note: The party Verjamem was not included in the survey as it did not exist yet.)	10.1	5.3	8.4	15.7	2.9	4.4	—	—	21.0	1.2

== Results ==
The election was severely won by the right pole parties, winning 5 of the 8 seats for the European People's Party (EPP). Igor Šoltes won one seat for The Greens–European Free Alliance (Greens-EFA), whose member the party became after the election. Ivo Vajgl won a seat for the new Slovenian European party Democratic Party of Pensioners (DeSUS), which became member of the Alliance of Liberals and Democrats for Europe Party, after election in the European Parliament. The leader of the Social Democrats (SD) Igor Lukšič, was not elected in the parliament even though he was the president of the party and its main candidate. He was beaten by Tanja Fajon by preferential voting with 11.691 against 6.882 votes for her party colleague.

Party	Votes	%	Seats	+/–
Slovenian Democratic Party	99,643	24.78	3	0
New Slovenia + Slovenian People's Party	66,760	16.60	2	+1
Verjamem	41,525	10.33	1	New
Democratic Party of Pensioners of Slovenia	32,662	8.12	1	+1
Social Democrats	32,484	8.08	1	–1
Positive Slovenia	26,649	6.63	0	New
United Left	21,985	5.47	0	New
Kacin – Concretely	19,762	4.92	0	New
Slovenian National Party	16,210	4.03	0	0
Dream Job	14,228	3.54	0	New
Pirate Party	10,273	2.56	0	New
Solidarity	6,715	1.67	0	New
Civic List	4,600	1.14	0	New
Zares	3,808	0.95	0	–1
Greens of Slovenia	3,335	0.83	0	New
Slovenian Nation	1,432	0.36	0	New
Total	402,071	100.00	8	0
Valid votes	402,071	95.81		
Invalid/blank votes	17,590	4.19		
Total votes	419,661	100.00		
Registered voters/turnout	1,710,856	24.53		
Source: Volitve

== Aftermath ==
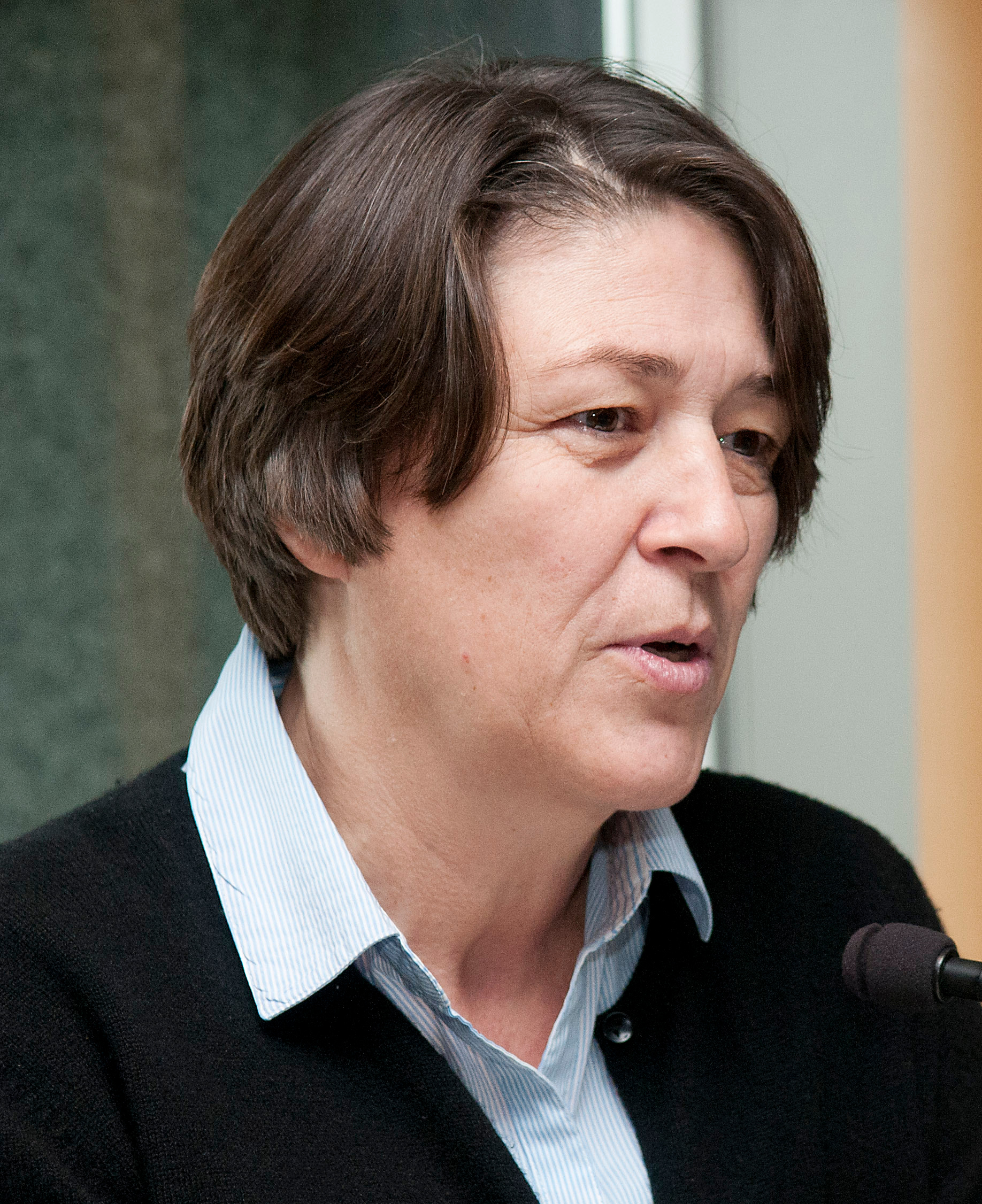
Commissioner from Slovenia Violeta Bulc

A candidate for the presidency of the European Commission Jean-Claude Juncker wished to have a name of the candidate for the new Slovenian commissioner until 1 August 2014. A huge debate took place right after the election and was a played a part of the pre-election time. Bratušek, who was still a prime minister at the moment, wished to send a name of the candidate by herself, which was strongly opposed by the leader of SMC Miro Cerar. After his victory on the parliamentary elections, he proposed the current commissioner Janez Potočnik as a potential common candidate of the government and the potential new coalition parties. The government placed his proposal on the list of candidates along with the Prime Minister Alenka Bratušek (ZaAB), Karl Erjavec (DeSUS-ALDE) and Tanja Fajon (SD-PES). The actual commissioner withdrew his candidature, as he did not agree with the multitude of the candidates. The self nomination of Alenka Bratušek caused even bigger storm in Slovenian political atmosphere, as many saw her move as an act of private interest. Her action is now under investigation by Commission for the Prevention of Corruption of the Republic of Slovenia (KPK). Driven by decisive victory on the election to European parliament, the Slovenian MEP's members of the EPP, Milan Zver (SDS), Alojz (Lojze) Peterle (NSi), Franc Bogovič (SLS), Romana Tomc (SDS) and Patricija Šulin (SDS) wrote a letter of complaint and concern to Jean-Claude Juncker expressing regret as none of the proposed potential commissioner is not a member of the triumphant EPP. Miro Cerar was displeased with the expulsion of Janez Potočnik from the race for the European commissioner, and announced his reaction as soon as he will be named and confirmed as a Prime Minister-designate on 25 August 2014. Cerar, as the newly named Prime Minister-designate, declared his first action will be a letter to Juncker in which he shall consult the candidate for the new leader of European Commission. In the background a big lobbying battle took place, as Tanja Fajon, strongly supported by PES, has been invited to formal conversation with Juncker. Karl Erjavec also announced a meeting with potential leader of the Commission after the appointment of presidents of the European Council on 30 August. Janez Potočnik returned to the race, after SMC refused co-operation with ZaAB in the new coalition, but was soon backed out by the original trio of candidates (Bratušek, Erjavec and Fajon). Prime minister designate Cerar announced his support to Fajon and Erjavec, but ex prime minister Bratušek did not back down and continued lobbying in the European parliament, looking for support among the European parties. Juncker soon named Bratušek a Vice-President of the European Commission designate and a European Commissioner for Energy designate, but she faced big opposition both in European parliament and in Slovenia, as the people did not support her candidature. She faced a hearing in front of the representatives of the European Parliament on 6. of October. European MP's were not impressed by her presentation and vision for the Energy Union so they refused her as a candidate for the named position and asked Juncker to replacer her or name her on a new position. Under an investigation of Commission for the Prevention of Corruption of the Republic of Slovenia and huge pressure from Slovenia, Bratušek finally resigned as the candidate for Commissioner from Slovenia on 9. of October 2014. New Cerar's government named ex Minister without Portfolio responsible for Development, Strategic Projects and Cohesion Violeta Bulc, who was confirmed as a candidate for European Commissioner for Transport and later also passed the hearing in front of the European MP's. Bulc assumed her new position on 1 November 2014.
