= Šentgotard =

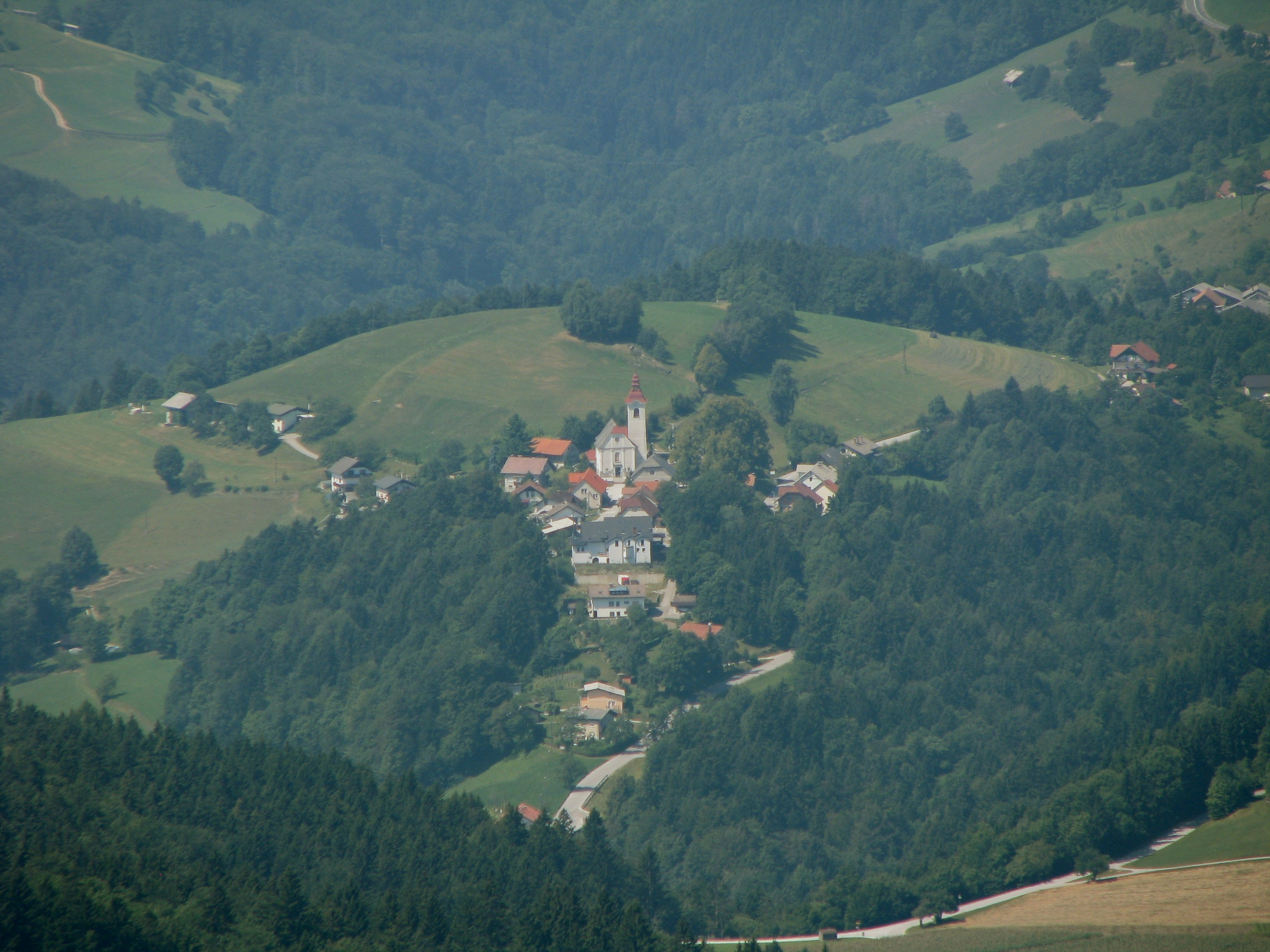

- Location in Slovenia
- Coordinates: 46°11′15.54″N 14°54′27.48″E
- Country: Slovenia
- Traditional region: Upper Carniola
- Statistical region: Central Sava
- Municipality: Zagorje ob Savi

Area
  - Total: 0.73 km^{2} (0.28 sq mi)
- Elevation: 627.2 m (2,058 ft)

Population (2002)
  - Total: 64
- Postal code: 1222

Šentgotard (pronounced [ʃɛntˈɡoːtaɾt] or [ʃəntˈɡoːtaɾt]; German: Sankt Gotthard) is a village in the hills east of Trojane in central Slovenia. It lies in the Municipality of Zagorje ob Savi. The area is part of the traditional region of Upper Carniola. It is now included with the rest of the municipality in the Central Sava Statistical Region.

== Church ==
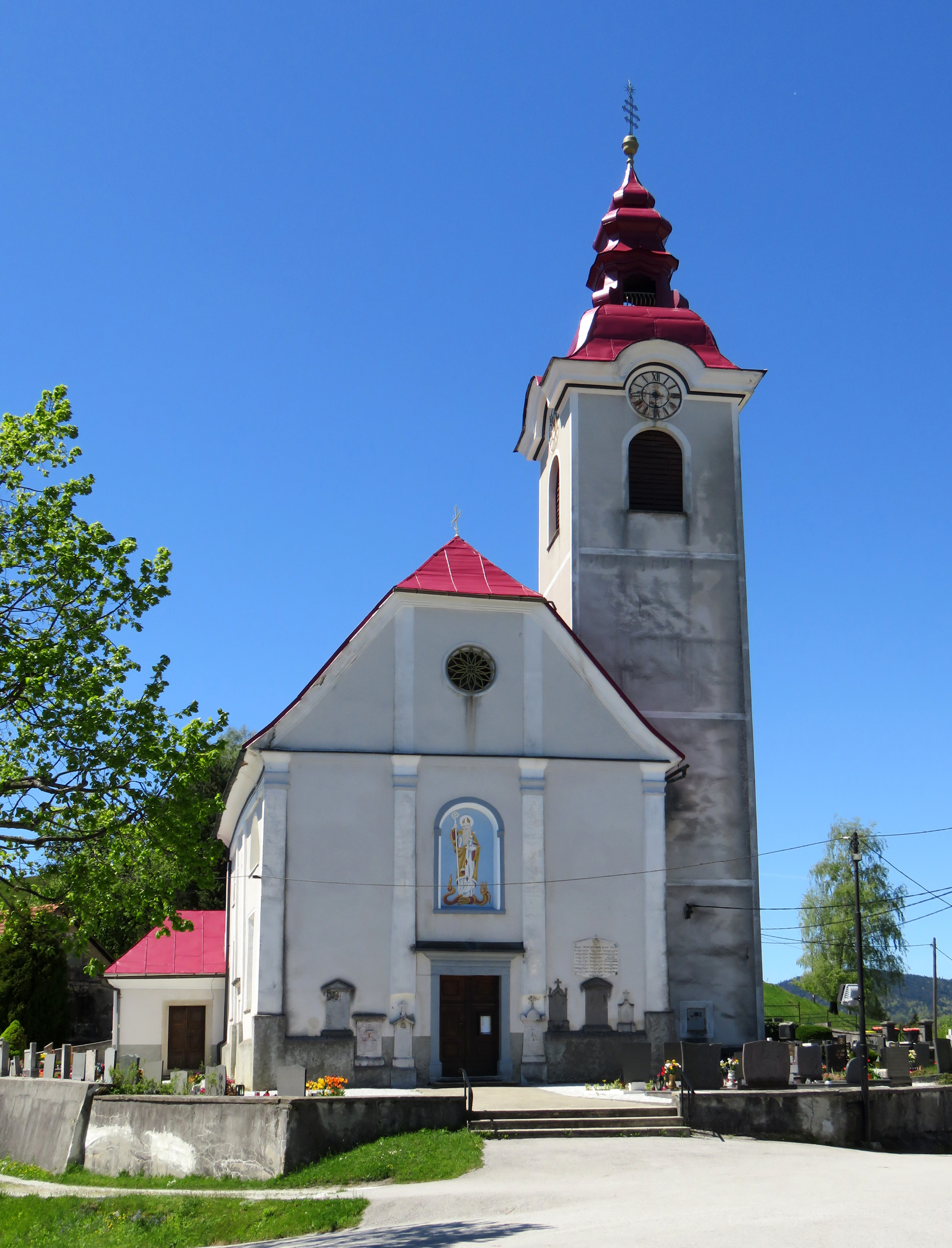
Saint Gotthard's Church

The local parish church, from which the settlement gets its name, is dedicated to Saint Gotthard and belongs to the Roman Catholic Archdiocese of Ljubljana. It dates to the 18th century.

== Notable people ==
France Cukjati, a deputy speaker of the National Assembly of Slovenia, was born in Šentgotard in 1943.
