= V Zideh =

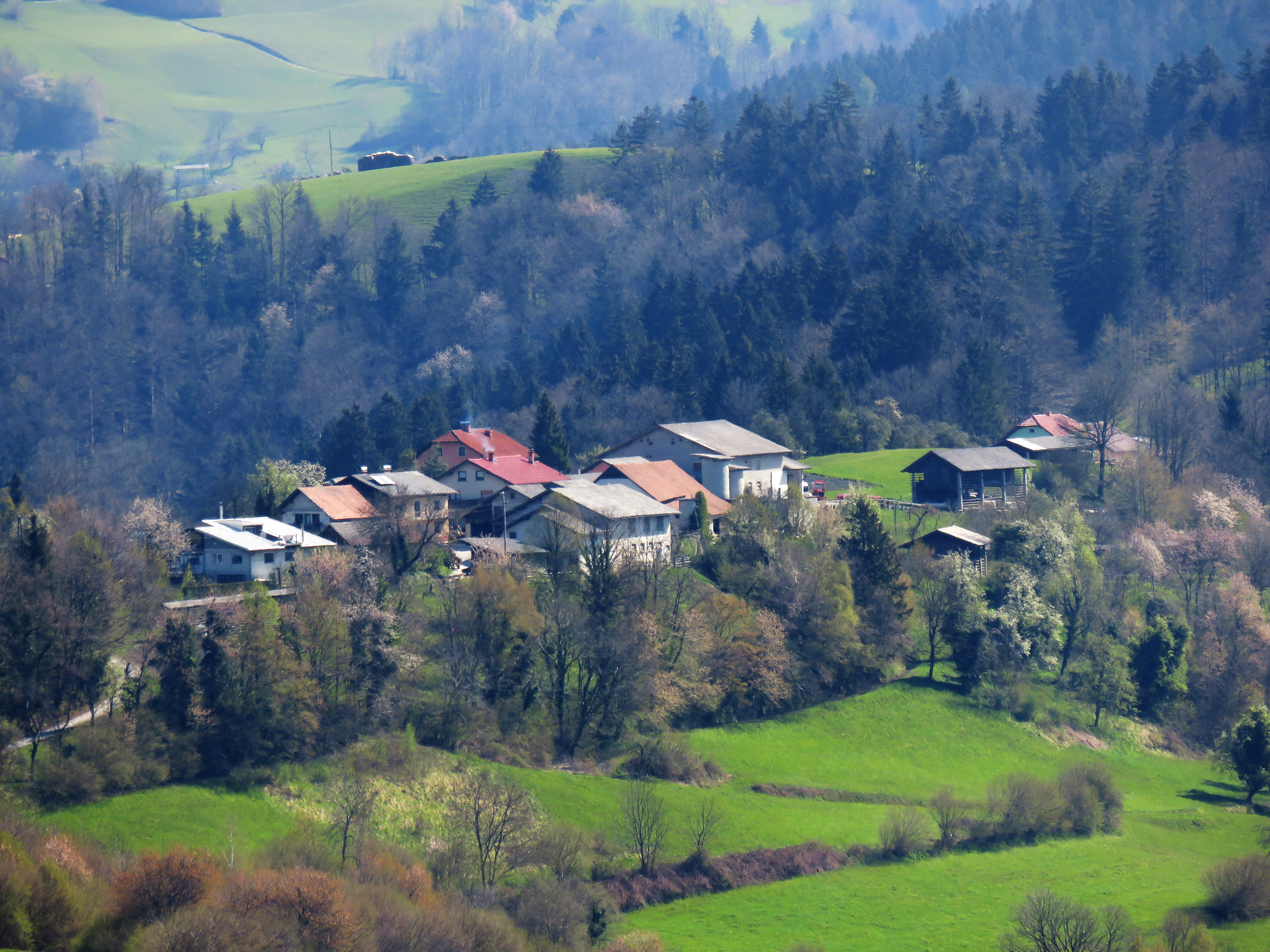

- Location in Slovenia
- Coordinates: 46°11′18.09″N 14°53′35.71″E
- Country: Slovenia
- Traditional region: Upper Carniola
- Statistical region: Central Slovenia
- Municipality: Lukovica

Area
  - Total: 0.81 km^{2} (0.31 sq mi)
- Elevation: 562.1 m (1,844 ft)

Population (2002)
  - Total: 65

V Zideh (pronounced [w ziˈdeːx]) is a settlement east of Trojane in the Municipality of Lukovica in the eastern part of the Upper Carniola region of Slovenia. The settlement includes the main hamlet of V Zideh southeast of Trojane as well as the hamlet of Podzid (in older sources also Pod Zidom, German: Podsid) northeast of Trojane.

== Name ==
V Zideh is also known locally as Zide. The name V Zideh literally means 'in the walls/fortification', the name of the hamlet Podzid or Pod Zidom literally means 'below the wall/fortification', and the local name Zide is originally an accusative plural meaning 'walls/fortifications'. All of these names are connected with a Roman-era defensive wall.

== History ==
In the 2nd century AD, V Zideh was connected with the Roman way station at Trojane, the defensive wall of which extended to the hamlets of V Zideh and Podzid. Slavic settlement at V Zideh was attested in 1444. Teamsters used to rest their horses at V Zideh before making the climb to Trojane.

== Church ==
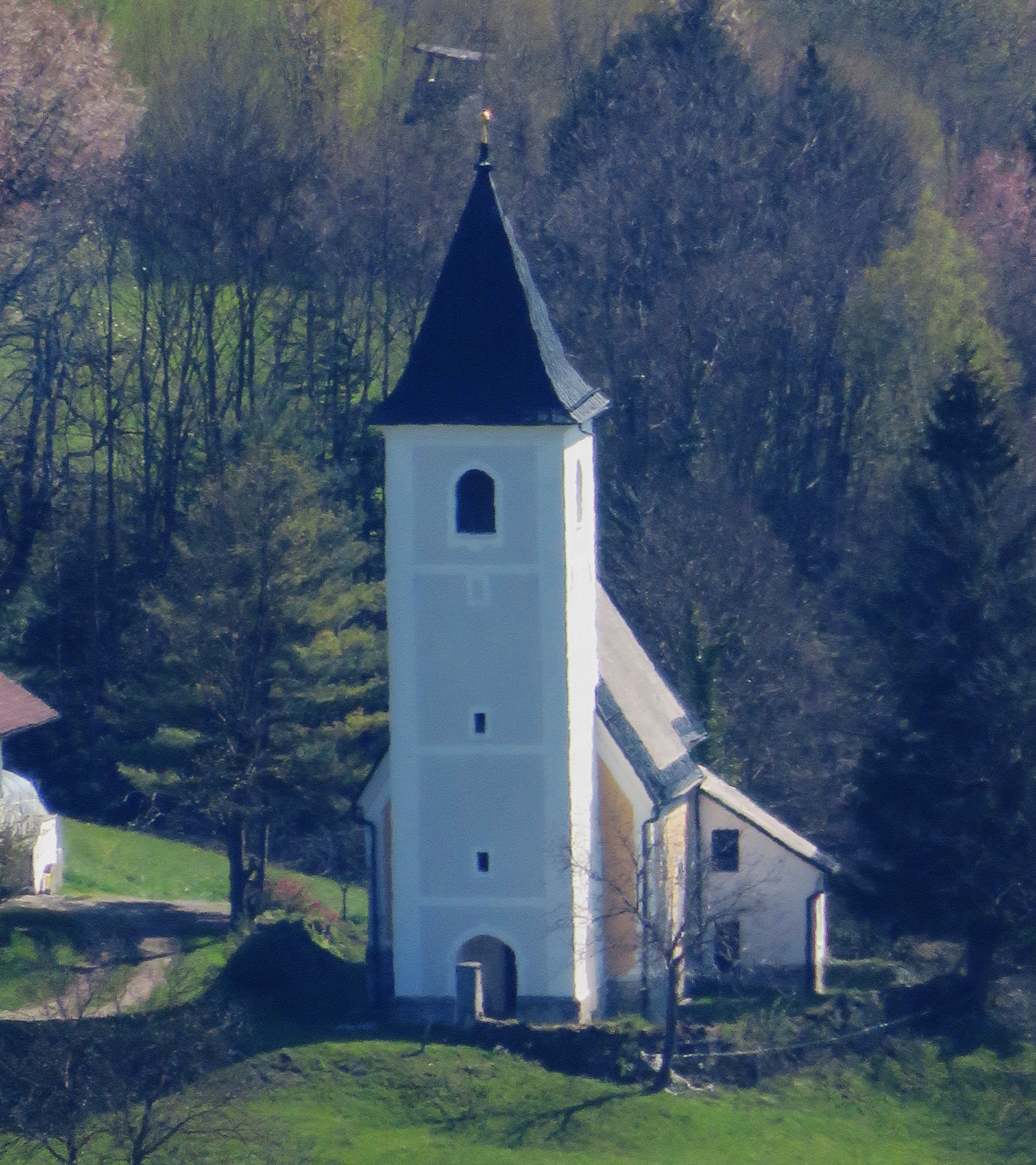
View from the west

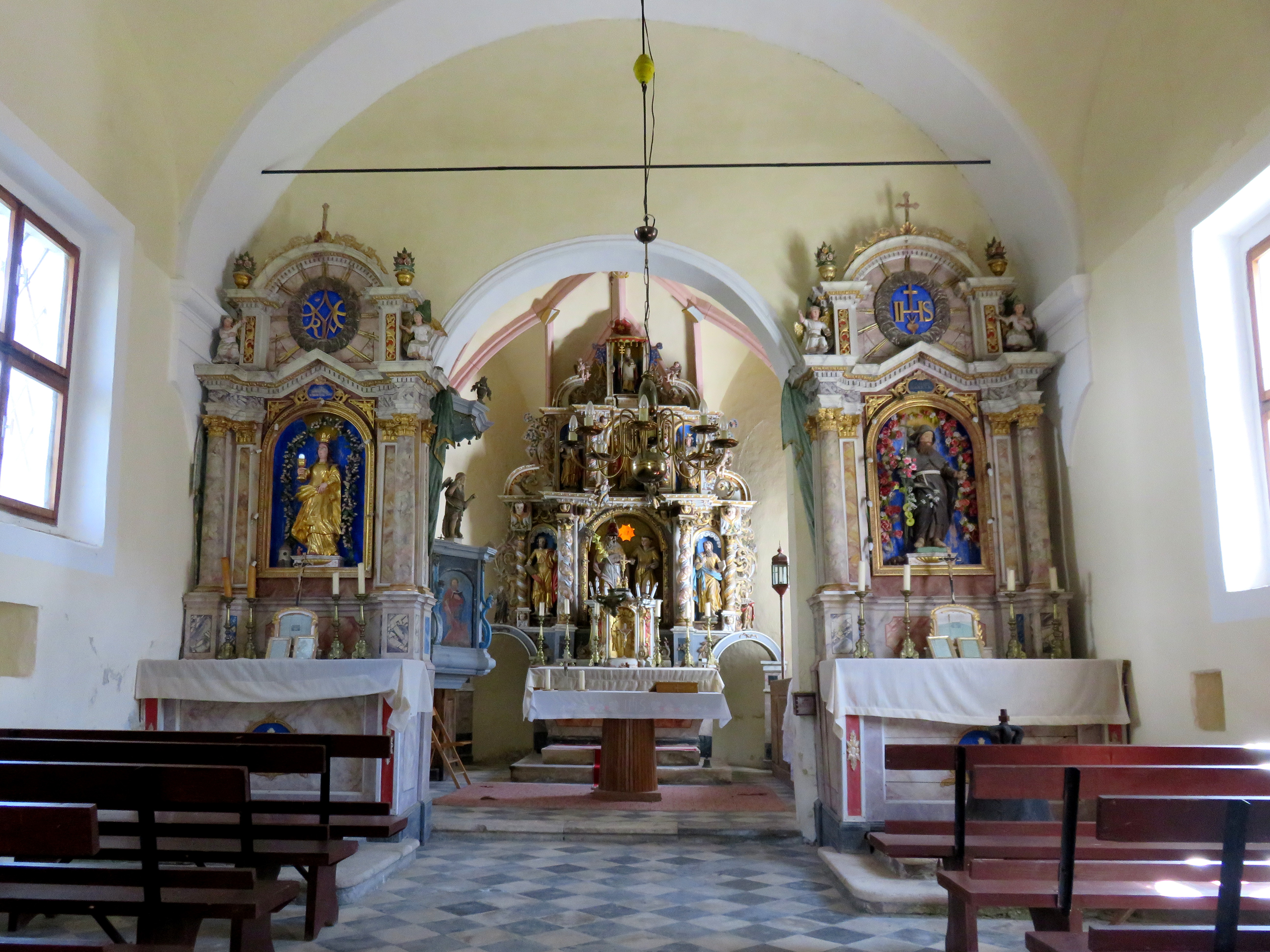
Interior

Saints Hermagoras and Fortunatus Church

The local church is dedicated to Saints Hermagoras and Fortunatus. It dates to the second half of the 15th century, and the workmanship of the keystones in the chancel link it to the stonemason workshop in Kamnik. The south wall of the chancel features a fresco of the crucifixion and fragments of a fresco of Saint Catherine dating to 1460. The main altar is from the second half of the 17th century.
