= József Györkös =

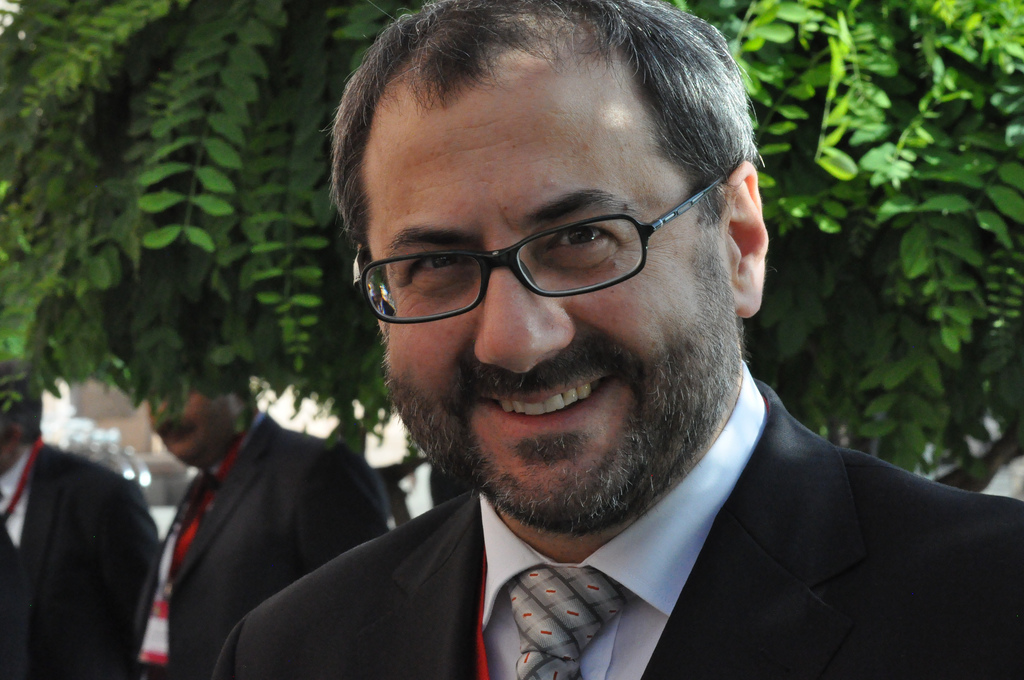
József Györkös

József Györkös (born April 18, 1961) is a Slovenian university professor and former politician. He graduated from the University of Maribor and has a PhD in computer science. He is part time professor at that university, with a research interest in the information society and media convergence. For several years Györkös was a state secretary (deputy minister) in the government of Republic of Slovenia. He grew up as a member of the Hungarian community in the multicultural environment of the city of Lendava/Lendva, Slovenia. From November 1, 2014, to October 29, 2019, he was Director of the Slovenian Research Agency (ARRS), and acting Director from 30 October 2019 to 29 April 2020.

After graduation, his work first focused on software development methodologies, and then on quality systems and decision theories; in the last decade, his research has concentrated on the information society and media convergence. Some references for his scientific work can be found as follows: A search in COBISS shows 416 publications with his name since 1986. He was co-editor in the Springer Verlag book on re-engineering or information systems. He was guest editor of Informatica Journal on Media in Information Society.

Between 2001 and 2004 under Prime Minister Janez Drnovšek, followed by Anton Rop, and Minister Pavel Gantar, Györkös was the State Secretary at the Ministry of Information Society.

He was a delegate of Slovenia to the World Summit on the Information Society in Geneva, 2003 and participant of PrepComs for the WSIS Tunis 2005, and he participated at the Internet governance forum in Egypt in 2009. He was also representing Slovenia in the Regional Commonwealth of Communications (RCC).

From November 22, 2008, until June 22, 2011, in the government of Prime Minister Borut Pahor, and under minister Gregor Golobič, he was the state secretary at the Ministry of Higher Education, Science and Technology, including the portfolio of information society. As such he was responsible for:

- Introduction of a new model of financing the higher education aimed to increase the autonomy and predictable financing of the higher education institutions.
- Preparation of two national strategies (Audacious Slovenia) for the next decade of research and higher education. .
- Coordination of the analog to digital switchover process for digital terrestrial television in 2010.

He was a co-signer of an initiative for public discussion of ACTA.

In January 2013 he was appointed a member and the chair of CAF – CONNECT Advisory Forum for ICT Research and Innovation. The main task of the advisory groups is to give consistent and consolidated advice to the commission (Directorate General for Communications, Networks, Content and Technology (DG CONNECT)) services during the preparation of the Horizon 2020 work programme, regarding the relevant challenge/part of the Specific Programme. Since November 2017 he is a member of Science Europe Governing Board.
