= France Cukjati =

Slovenian politician, physician, and theologian (born 1943)

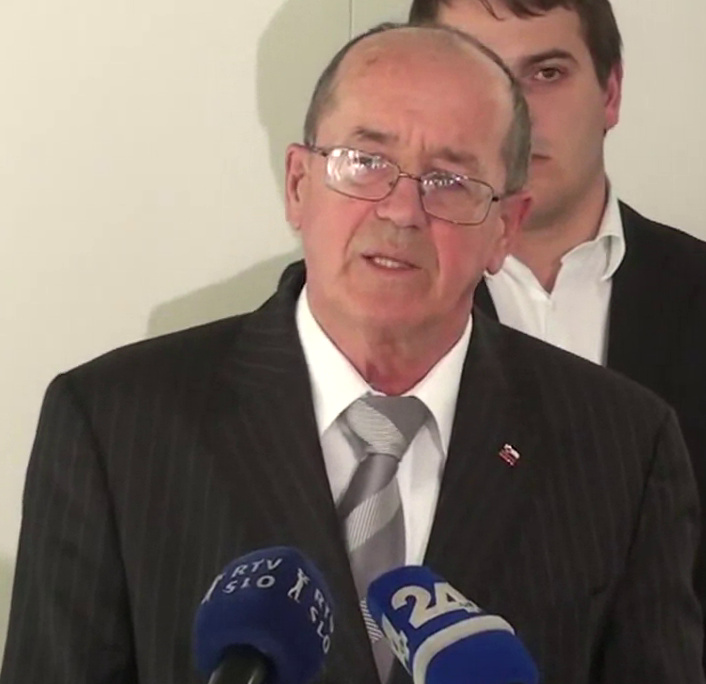
- Born: Šentgotard near Trojane, Slovenia (then part of the German Third Reich)
- Education: University of Ljubljana, University of Zagreb, Goethe University Frankfurt
- Occupations: politician, physician, and theologian
- Known for: his advocacy against same-sex marriages, civil unions, and LGBT adoption
- Notable work: deputy speaker of the National Assembly of Slovenia (until 2011)

France Cukjati (born February 15, 1943) is a Slovenian politician, physician, theologian, and former Jesuit. Until 21 December 2011, he served as deputy speaker of the National Assembly of Slovenia.

He was born in the village of Šentgotard near Trojane in central Slovenia (then part of the German Third Reich). His father fell in World War II as a member of the Yugoslav Partisan resistance, and his mother was a local schoolteacher. He studied civil engineering at the University of Ljubljana before being drafted into the Yugoslav People's Army. In 1964, he entered the Jesuit order. In 1966, he enrolled at the University of Zagreb, where he studied philosophy. After graduation, he studied theology at the University of Frankfurt in Germany. Upon returning to Slovenia, he served as a priest in Maribor and Borovnica. In 1971, he quit the priesthood and enrolled at the Faculty of Medicine in Ljubljana, where he graduated in 1978. He worked as a physician in Ljubljana and Vrhnika.

In June 2000, he was named secretary at the Ministry of Health in the short-lived center-right government of Andrej Bajuk. The same year, he was elected to the Slovenian National Assembly in the district of Vrhnika as a candidate of the Slovenian Democratic Party. He was re-elected in 2004. The same year, he was elected as speaker of the National Assembly. After the victory of the left-wing coalition in the parliamentary elections of 2008, he was replaced by Pavle Gantar. He was however chosen as deputy speaker of the National Assembly, representing the opposition parties.

Since December 2008, he has served as a member of Slovenia's shadow cabinet, covering welfare.

Cukjati is well known for his advocacy against same-sex marriages, civil unions, and LGBT adoption. In a parliamentary debate, he has stated that homosexuality should not be considered normal, but a psychological problem that should receive treatment. Despite these opinions, Cukjati has supported the legalization of same-sex civil unions that grant notably fewer rights than marriage, passed by the right-wing parliamentary majority in 2005.

Political offices
Preceded by Feri Horvat	Speaker of the National Assembly of Slovenia; 2004 – 2008	Succeeded by Pavel Gantar
