= Igor Luksic =

Igor Luksic may refer to:

- Igor Lukšić (born 1976), Montenegrin politician
- Igor Lukšič (born 1961), Slovenian politician
