= Zares =

Really — Social Liberals Zares — socialno-liberalni
- Leader: Darja Radić (pro tempore)
- Founded: 2007
- Dissolved: 2015
- Split from: Liberal Democracy of Slovenia
- Headquarters: Ljubljana
- Ideology: Social liberalism Pro-Europeanism
- Political position: Centre to centre-left
- European affiliation: Alliance of Liberals and Democrats for Europe
- International affiliation: Liberal International (observer)
- Colours: Orange
- National Assembly: 0 / 90
- European Parliament: 0 / 8

Website
- https://www.zares.si

Zares – Social Liberals (Slovene: Zares – socialno-liberalni) was a social-liberal political party in Slovenia.

Its first president was Gregor Golobič, former Secretary General of the Liberal Democracy of Slovenia and former close advisor to the late Janez Drnovšek, who had previously abandoned active political involvement due to disagreements with his party. Until October 2011, the party was called Zares - New Politics (Zares - nova politika), when the party adopted its current title.

The party supported a social progressive and economically social-liberal agenda, strongly supported the European Union and was a staunch opponent of the former Slovenian Prime Minister Janez Janša. Since 17 November 2007, Zares has been an observer member of the Liberal International, and was also a member of the Alliance of Liberals and Democrats for Europe (ALDE).

== History ==
Zares was founded in 2007 as the result of a split within the Liberal Democracy of Slovenia, when 6 MPs of the National Assembly, led by former Minister of Economy Matej Lahovnik, left their original party and founded a new parliamentary group. In the 2007 presidential election, the party supported Independent presidential candidate Danilo Türk, who was elected President of Slovenia.

The party's first election, Zares gathered 9.4% of the vote, gaining 9 parliamentary seats and became the third strongest party in Slovenia. Before the election the party allied itself with the Social Democrats and the Liberal Democracy of Slovenia in an unofficial coalition. From November 2008 till October 2011, Zares was part of the centre-left government led by Social Democrats party president Borut Pahor. At the 2011 Slovenian parliamentary election on 4 December 2011, Zares won 0.65% of the vote, thus not reaching the parliamentary threshold of 4%.

On 15 February 2012, Pavel Gantar received a 78% support at the party congress and became the new president. After party received only 0.91% of votes in the 2014 European Parliament election, and thus losing the party's European parliament representation, Gantar resigned as party president. He was replaced by Darja Radić as a pro tempore president.

== Prominent members ==
Leaders

- Gregor Golobič: 2007-2012
- Pavel Gantar: 2012-2014
- Darja Radić: 2014-2015

Other prominent members

- Franco Juri - vice president (?-2012)
- Darja Radić - vice president (?-2012)
- Cvetka Ribarič Lasnik - vice president (2012-)
- Vito Rožej - vice president (2012-)
- József Györkös
- Janez Kopač
- Matej Lahovnik - left the party on 5 July 2010
- Andrej Rus
- Majda Širca
- Vito Turk
- Ivo Vajgl

Other prominent former members

- Alenka Bratušek
- Dušan Radonjič

== Ultra Scandal ==
In June 2009, Golobič was involved in the so-called Ultra Scandal, named after the Slovenian IT company Ultra, where Golobič was employed between 2003 and 2007. He was accused of misleading the media about his investment into that company during the campaign for the 2008 parliamentary election. According to allegations, the company had some 21 million euro of unsecured loans at the state-owned Nova Ljubljanska Banka (NLB). When the media examined the loans, it came out that Golobič owns 10% of Ultra SUM, a Netherlands-based company which owns 70% of Ultra company. This was a fact that he had withheld from the public during the 2008 general election campaign. Golobič publicly apologized for having misled the public, but refused to resign as the minister of Higher Education, Science and Technology.

The Ultra Scandal was also one of the reasons for the decision of Matej Lahovnik, one of the co-founders of the party Zares, to leave the party in July 2010. Lahovnik, at the time Minister of Economy, mentioned Golobič's alleged misuse of political influence in order to favor his business partners as one of the reasons for his break with the party. As a response, Golobič demanded that Lahovnik step down from his position of Minister of Economy and qualified his behavior as "Brutus-like", that is, treacherous.
