= Melita Župevc =

Slovenian politician (born 1978)

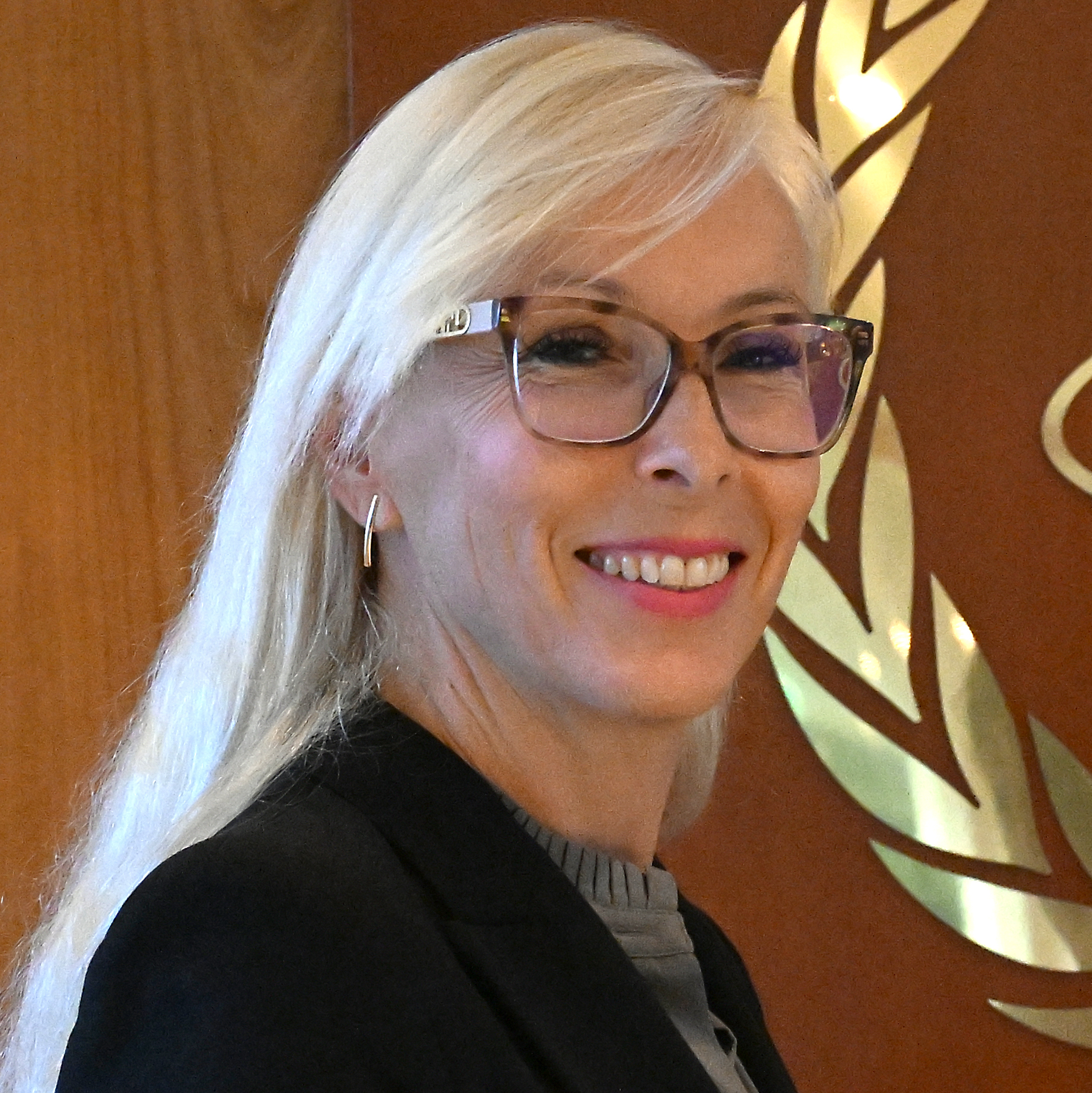
- in 2024
- Born: 16 June 1978 (age 47); Trbovlje
- Known for: MP and Ambassador
- Political party: Social Democrats, Positive Slovenia
- Partner: Robert Golob

Melita Zupevc (born 16 June 1978) is a Slovenian politician. In 2024 she became an ambassador to Vienna.

== Life ==
Župevc was born in 1978 in the town of Trbovlje.

In 1996, she graduated from the town's High School and she studied journalism and sociology at the Faculty of Social Sciences in Ljubljana, where she graduated in 2003. Until 2001, she worked at Radio Trbovlje and in local media, and then in 2001-2005 she worked at POP TV.

She was a spokesperson (2005–07), Social Democrat spokesperson (2007). She became a public relations advisor to the president of the Republic of Slovenia in 2007 and Social Democrat spokesperson again in 2008. In 2008, she was elected to the National Assembly of the Republic of Slovenia for the Social Democrats. She was later in the Positive Slovenia party.

In March 2024, she was appointed by her boss, Robert Golob, the prime minister, to be an ambassador to Vienna despite not being a trained diplomat. She had been the prime minister's state secretary for strategic communication. The appointment caused some controversy even though she had been vetted by the Ministry of Foreign Affairs' committee led by Mirjam Škrk. The previous ambassador was Barbara Žvokelj.

The prime minister is allowed to make political appointments to six (10% of) diplomatic positions, Golob is the leader of the Freedom Party and his candidates have to be approved by the president Nataša Pirc Musar. It was believed that the president did not want political appointees in positions that covered several international organisations (like in Vienna), but Župevc met and reassured her.
