= Verjamem =

- Leader: Igor Šoltes
- Founded: 2014
- Dissolved: 2022
- Merged into: Social Democrats
- Ideology: Social democracy Social liberalism Environmentalism; Anti-austerity; Soft Euroscepticism
- Political position: Centre-left
- European Parliament group: Greens/EFA
- Slovenian National Assembly: 0 / 90
- European Parliament: 0 / 8

Website
- www.verjamem.si

Verjamem (meaning "I believe" in Slovene) was a centre-left political party in Slovenia. The party was led by Igor Šoltes, former President of the Court of Auditors.

At the 2014 European Parliament election, the party received 10.46% of the vote, winning one of Slovenia's eight seats in the parliament taken by party leader Igor Šoltes, who chose to sit with The Greens–European Free Alliance (Greens/EFA) group as an associated MEP.

The party received 0.78% of the vote in the Slovenian parliamentary election on 13 July 2014, and did not win any seats in parliament.
