= Anton Bebler =

Slovenian political scientist (1937–2026)

Anton Bebler (10 March 1937 – 5 April 2026) was a Slovenian political scientist, diplomat and politician. He served as the first Permanent Representative of independent Slovenia to the United Nations Office at Geneva from 1992 to 1997, was a founding figure of defence studies in Slovenia at the University of Ljubljana, and stood as a candidate in the 2002 Slovenian presidential election.

== Early life and education ==
Bebler was born in Moscow on 10 March 1937, the son of Aleš Bebler, a Slovenian and Yugoslav communist, politician, and diplomat who was then in political emigration in the Soviet Union. He spent his childhood in the Soviet Union and began his university studies in mechanical engineering in Moscow before moving to Yugoslavia after his first year, continuing his studies first in Ljubljana and then in Belgrade, where he graduated in Slavic languages.

He pursued postgraduate studies in the United States, France, and the United Kingdom, and obtained a master's degree from the High School of Political Sciences in Belgrade in 1966. In 1971, he completed a doctorate in political science at the University of Pennsylvania in Philadelphia with research on the political role of the military in Africa.

== Academic career ==
From 1963 to 1970, Bebler was a researcher at the Institute for International Politics and Economics in Belgrade, and from 1970 to 1972 at the Center for International Studies at Princeton University in the United States. In 1972, he joined the Faculty of Sociology, Political Sciences and Journalism (FSPN), later renamed the Faculty of Social Sciences (FDV), at the University of Ljubljana.

In 1975, he became the founding chair of the defence studies department at FSPN, establishing one of the earliest academic programmes of its kind in Slovenia. He subsequently served as vice-dean and full professor at the faculty and was named professor emeritus of the University of Ljubljana. His scholarship focused on civil–military relations, security studies, African political systems, and disarmament; his published works include Military Rule in Africa: Dahomey, Ghana, Sierra Leone, Mali (1971) and the co-edited volume Contemporary Political Systems: Classifications and Typologies (1990).

== Diplomatic and political career ==
In 1992, shortly after Slovenian independence, Bebler was appointed Slovenia's first Permanent Representative – Ambassador to the United Nations Office at Geneva and to other international organisations based in Switzerland, including the World Trade Organization, the World Health Organization, and the International Labour Organization; he held the post until 1997.

After returning from Geneva, Bebler became President of the Euro-Atlantic Council of Slovenia in February 1998 and from 1999 to 2002 served as Vice-Chairman of the Atlantic Treaty Association, advocating for Slovenia's accession to NATO and to the European Union. He also chaired the Slovenian Emigrant Association (Slovenska izseljenska matica) and the Slovenian Octet.

In the 2002 Slovenian presidential election, Bebler ran as the candidate of the Democratic Party of Pensioners of Slovenia (DeSUS), supported by 3,000 voters' signatures, and received 1.85% of the vote in the first round. From 2006 to 2009 he served as a member of the Executive Council of the International Political Science Association.

== Personal life and death ==
Bebler was married to Darja Lavtižar-Bebler, a former journalist and member of the National Assembly of Slovenia. The couple had two sons. He died on 5 April 2026, at the age of 89.
