= Gregor Golobič =

Slovenian politician (born 1964)

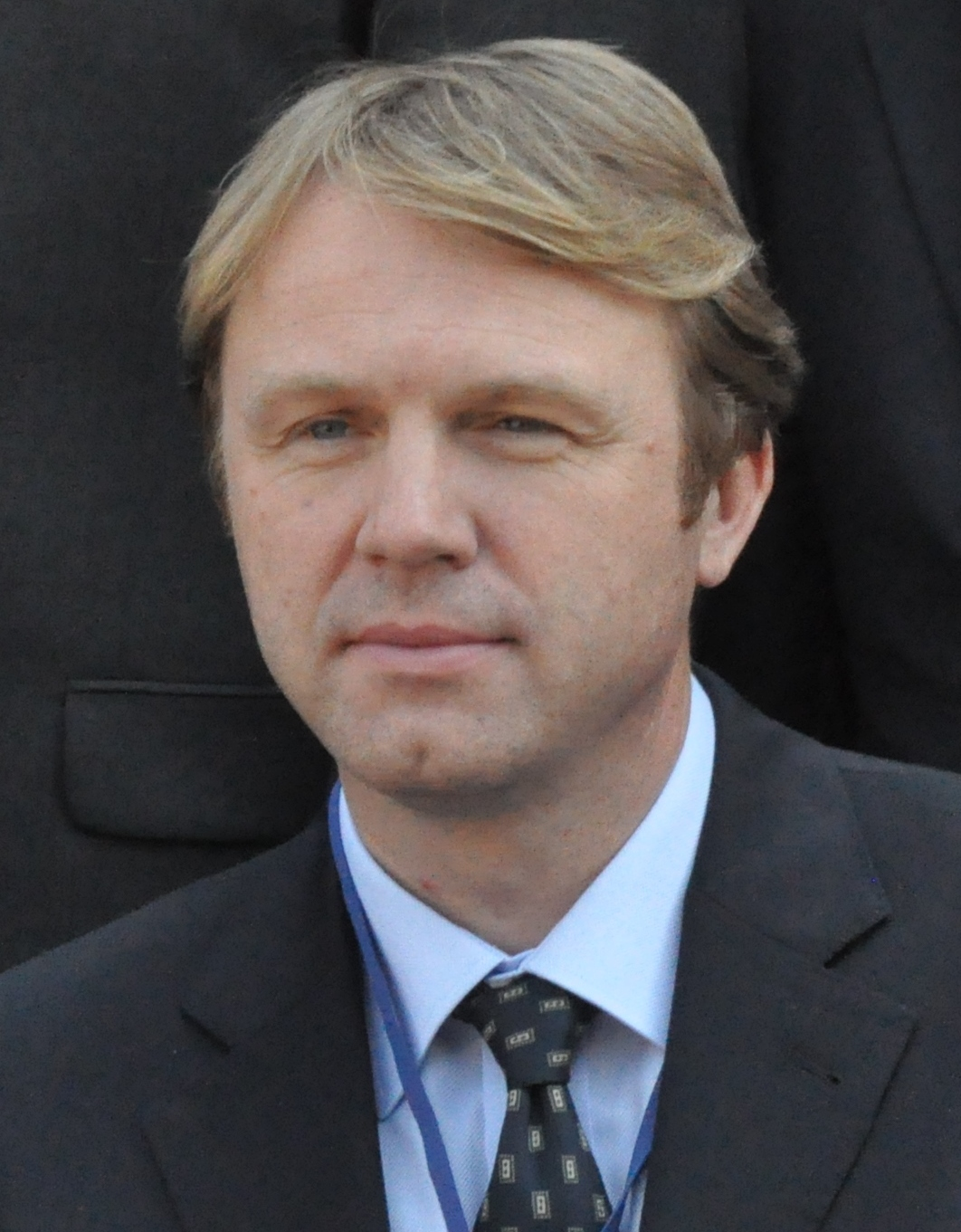
- Gregor Golobič on May 8, 2010

Personal details
- Born: January 20, 1964 (age 62) Novo Mesto, Socialist Republic of Slovenia, Yugoslavia
- Party: LDS (1990-2007); Zares (2007-2015)

Gregor Golobič (born January 20, 1964) is a retired Slovenian politician. Between 2007 and 2012 he was president of the left liberal party Zares and between November 2008 and June 2011, he served as Minister for Science and Higher Education of Slovenia.

== Life ==
Golobič was born in the Slovenian town of Novo Mesto, then in former Yugoslavia. He attended the Novo Mesto Grammar School. He enrolled at the University of Ljubljana, where he studied philosophy. In 1988, already as a student, he became employed by the Alliance of Socialist Youth of Slovenia, the youth organization of the League of Communists of Slovenia. Between 1992 and 2001, he served as the Secretary-General of the ruling Liberal Democracy of Slovenia.

In 2002, he obtained his BA in philosophy from the University of Ljubljana with a thesis on a Lacanian critique of the philosophy of Cratylus. In 2006, he left his former party and in October 2007, he was elected president of the newly formed party Zares, made mostly of former members of the Liberal Democracy. In the 2008 parliamentary elections he was elected to the Slovenian National Assembly. In November of the same year, he was appointed Minister for Higher Education, Science and Technology in the centre left government of Borut Pahor.

On April 21, 2011, he announced his resignation as Minister due to disagreements with the policies of the Prime Minister Borut Pahor. In June 2011, Golobič resigned from his position as Minister of Education. His resignation was followed by other ministers of the Zares party later in the same month, opening a government crisis, which was resolved in September 2011 with the vote of no confidence to Borut Pahor and the calling of early elections in December 2011.

In February 2012, he was replaced by Pavel Gantar as the president of Zares. At the end of 2012, Golobič officially left politics, though he continues to be considered an important political figure with immense power, most of which he exercises behind the scenes.

== Controversies ==
In June 2009, Golobič was involved in the Ultra scandal named after the Slovenian IT company Ultra, where Golobič was employed between 2003 and 2007. He was accused of misleading the media about his investment into that company during the campaign for the 2008 parliamentary election. According to allegations, the company had some 21 million euro of unsecured loans at the state-owned Nova Ljubljanska Banka (NLB). When the media examined the loans, it came out that Golobič owns 10% of Ultra SUM, a Netherlands-based company which owns 70% of Ultra company. This was a fact that he had withheld from the public during the 2008 general election campaign. Golobič publicly apologized for having misled the public, but refused to resign as the minister of Higher Education, Science and Technology

The Ultra Scandal was also one of the reasons for the decision of Matej Lahovnik, one of the co-founders of the party Zares, to leave the party in July 2010. Lahovnik, at the time Minister of Economy, mentioned Golobič's alleged misuse of political influence in order to favor his business partners as one of the reasons for his break with the party. As a response, Golobič demanded that Lahovnik stepped down from his position of Minister of Economy and qualified his behavior as "Brutus-like", that is, treacherous.

Golobič is a close personal friend of the Slovenian Marxist philosopher Slavoj Žižek who frequently expressed admiration for him, once referring to Golobič as the "Slovenian Stalin". The epithet "Slovenian Stalin" has been frequently used since, mostly by his political opponents and the media.
