= Pavel Gantar =

Slovenian politician and sociologist

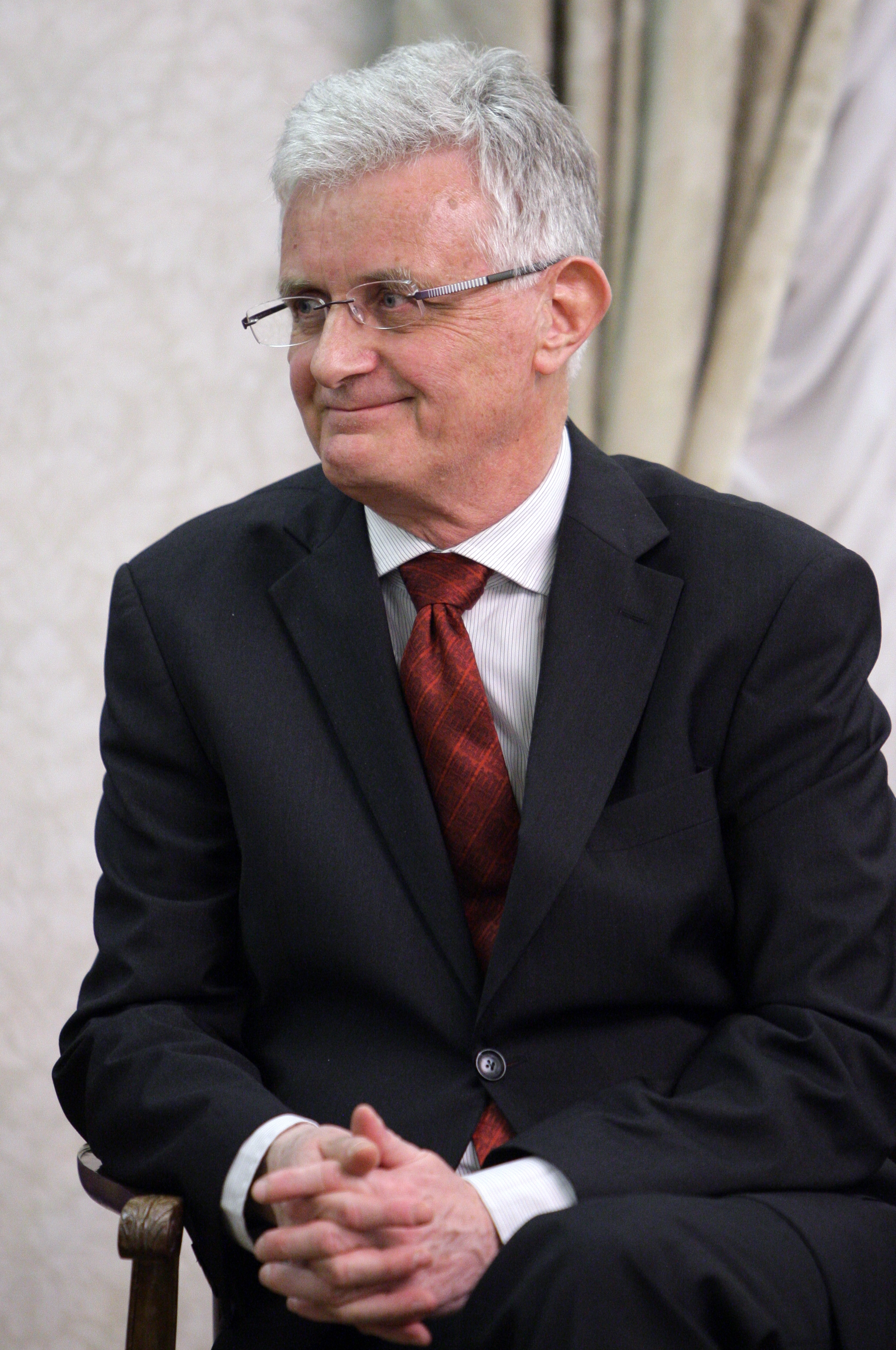
- Photo by National Assembly of Slovenia

Personal details
- Born: October 26, 1949 (age 76) Škofja Loka, PR Slovenia, FPR Yugoslavia
- Party: Zares

Pavel Gantar, also known as Pavle Gantar (born 26 October 1949) is a Slovenian politician and sociologist. Between 2008 and 2011, he served as speaker of the Slovenian National Assembly. From February 2012 and to their dissolution in 2015, he has been the president of the social liberal extra-parliamentary party Zares.

== Early life and education ==
Gantar was born in the Upper Carniolan village of Gorenja Vas near Škofja Loka, Slovenia, in what was then Socialist Federal Republic of Yugoslavia. After finishing a professional school for carpentry, he decided to enroll to the university. After passing the entry exams, he was accepted by the Faculty for Political Sciences at the University of Ljubljana, where he studied sociology. During his student years, Gantar was actively involved in student activities. In 1971, he was among the co-founder of the radical alternative student group November 13th, which included among other the famous philosopher Mladen Dolar. After graduating in 1974, he became an assistant professor at the Faculty of Social Sciences of the University of Ljubljana. In 1976, he joined the editorial board of the Journal for the Critique of Science (Časopis za kritiko znanosti, ČKZ), together with people like Mladen Dolar, Slavoj Žižek, and Rado Riha.

In 1984, he studied at the University of Essex, where he became acquainted with the liberal critique of Marxism. He became interested in the classical liberal thought and was especially influenced by the works of the Slovene-born British liberal economist Ljubo Sirc, who strongly criticized the Yugoslav economic model. Upon returning to Ljubljana, he was appointed as the chairman of the Communist Party cell at the Faculty of Social Sciences. In 1985, he used this position to defend the essayist Spomenka Hribar, who was accused of denigration of the Yugoslav People's Liberation War because an essay in which she publicly denounced the mass killings of the Slovene Home Guard after World War II. Because of this stand, Gantar was expelled from the Communist Party of Slovenia.

In the late 1980s, he was among the first scholars of contemporary underground social movements in Slovenia and Yugoslavia, together with Frane Adam and Gregor Tomc. He was actively involved in the so-called Slovenian Spring, the mass movement that brought to the democratization and independence of Slovenia. He was among the first to denounce the arrest of four journalist in the JBTZ-trial and was member of the Committee for the Defence of Human Rights, the central platform that led the democratization process in Slovenia between 1988 and 1990.

== Political career ==
In 1989, he obtained his PhD in sociology at the University of Zagreb. In 1990, he joined the Liberal Democratic Party. The same year, he was elected to the Parliament of Slovenia in the first free elections held in Slovenia after World War II.

Between 1994 and 2000, he served as the Minister of Environment in the cabinet of Janez Drnovšek. In 2001, he became the Minister of Information Society in the last cabinet led by Janez Drnovšek and later by Anton Rop.

In 2004, the Liberal Democracy of Slovenia was defeated by the centre-right Slovenian Democratic Party. Nevertheless, Gantar was elected to the National Assembly of Slovenia, where he served as an opposition MP until 2008. In 2007, he joined the newly formed social liberal Zares party led by Gregor Golobič. In 2008, he was re-elected to the Lower House of the Slovenian Parliament. Soon afterwards, he was elected as its speaker, succeeding France Cukjati.

Following the exit of the party Zares from the ruling coalition, Gantar resigned from his position in September 2011 and was succeeded by Ljubo Germič.

In February 2012, he replaced Gregor Golobič as the president of Zares. After his party received only 0.91% of votes in European Parliament election, he resigned as party president.

== Sources ==
- Biography of Pavle Gantar on the webportal "Slovenian Spring", run by the National Museum of Modern History

Political offices
Preceded by Miha Jazbinšek	Minister of Environment of Slovenia; 1994 - 2000	Succeeded by Andrej Umek
New title Ministry established	Minister for Information Society; 2000 - 2004	Ministry abolished
Preceded by France Cukjati	Speaker of the National Assembly of Slovenia; 2008 – 2011	Succeeded by Ljubo Germič
Preceded by Gregor Golobič	President of Zares - Social Liberals; 2012 – present	Incumbent
