= Igor Šoltes =

Slovenian lawyer and politician

Igor Šoltes MEP
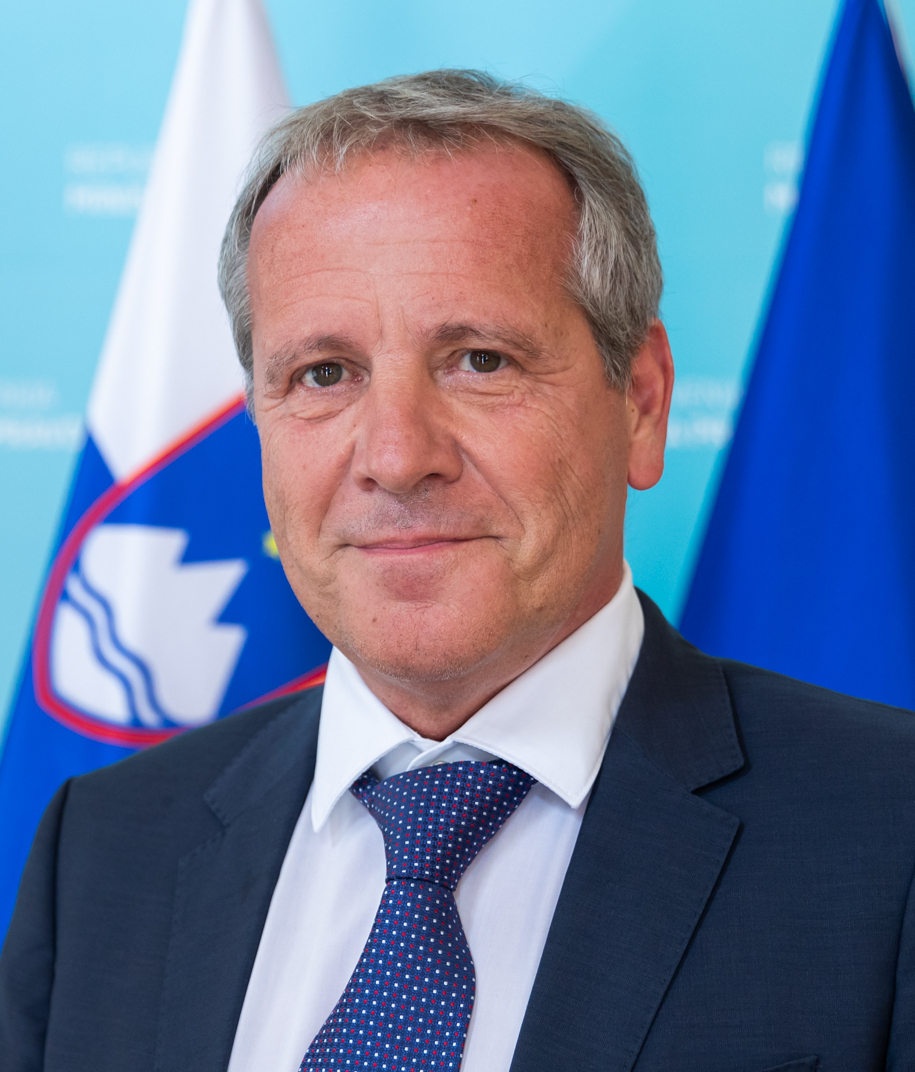

Member of the European Parliament for Slovenia
- In office 1 July 2014 – 2 July 2019

Personal details
- Born: August 22, 1964 (age 62) Ljubljana, Yugoslavia (now Slovenia)
- Party: SD
- Education: University of Ljubljana
- Website: Official website

Igor Šoltes (born August 22, 1964) is a Slovenian lawyer and politician.

== Career ==
Šoltes served as the President of the Court of Auditors of Slovenia from 2004 to 2013. In 2008, he received his PhD at the Faculty of Social Studies at the University of Ljubljana. In January 2014, Šoltes was seen as a possible candidate for minister of health; however, he decided to refuse the offer from Prime Minister Alenka Bratušek due to lack of political support in the coalition.

Before the 2014 European Parliament election, Šoltes formed a ticket named Verjamem (meaning "I believe" in Slovene) which won 10.45% of the vote, securing one seat in the European Parliament (for Šoltes). Following the election, Šoltes announced a plan to transform the ticket into a full political party at a congress that would take place on 4 June 2014 in order for the party to enter the parliamentary election in July 2014. After receiving 6,800 votes in the parliamentary election, he resigned as president of Verjamem.

In 2022, he ran in the parliamentary elections as a candidate of the Social Democrats (SD) but was not elected. He was later appointed State Secretary at the Ministry of Justice, responsible for criminal law, human rights, international cooperation, and judicial training. On 15 February 2024, he was dismissed in connection with the Judicial Building affair.

== Personal life ==
Šoltes is the grandson of the late Yugoslav politician and economist Edvard Kardelj.

== See also ==
- List of members of the European Parliament for Slovenia, 2014–19
