= Court of Audit of Slovenia =

Court of Audit of the Republic of Slovenia
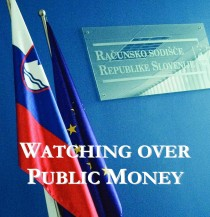
- Headquarters: Ljubljana, Slovenia
- Area served: Slovenia
- Key people: Jana Ahčin (President)
- Number of employees: 125 (2012)
- Website: www.rs-rs.si

The Court of Audit of the Republic of Slovenia (in Slovene: Računsko sodišče Republike Slovenije) is the highest body for supervising state accounts, the state budget and all public spending in Slovenia. The Constitution of Slovenia further provides that the Court of Audit is independent in the performance of its duties and bound by the Constitution and law. The Court of Audit Act also defines that the acts with which Court of Audit exercises its powers of audit cannot be challenged before the courts or other state bodies.

== The Position of the Court of Audit ==
The Court of Audit cannot be categorized within any of the three branches of power, legislative, executive or judicial. Its independent status is guaranteed in several respects by the Constitution and the law:

- The Court of Audit exercises its powers entirely independently. It is responsible for adopting its own programme of work. No body, institution or other entity may order it to carry out tasks nor give it instructions as to how to perform tasks, what sort of audit it should carry out or what it should audit. Pursuant to the Court of Audit Act, the deputies and working bodies of the National Assembly, the government, ministries and local authority bodies may propose that an audit be carried out; from among these proposals the Court of Audit selects for its annual work programme at least five proposals from the National Assembly, two of which must come from opposition deputies and at least two from the working bodies of the National Assembly. The Court of Audit can also, at its own discretion, act on proposals from individuals – this source of proposals includes articles and contributions in the media and civil society organisations.
- For covering the costs of its activities the Court of Audit proposes a financial plan to the National Assembly, which approves the required working funds. The Court of Audit is an independent budget user and receives budget funding under a special part of the budget, but it must use the funds in accordance with the provisions of the law regulating the implementation of the budget.

The law also contains the following provisions in connection with the functioning of the Court of Audit:

- provisions setting out the work methods and audit procedures;
- legal instruments are envisaged for ensuring and establishing accountability and for the dismissal of members of the Court of Audit, supreme state auditors and auditors;
- the Court of Audit is accountable to the National Assembly and the public for the implementation of its tasks, and so it has the right and the duty to report on its audit findings;
- the financial statements on the operations of the Court of Audit are audited by an auditor appointed by the National Assembly.

== Powers of the Court of Audit ==
The Court of Audit may audit any act on past operations as well as the act on the planned operations of public fund users.

Pursuant to the Act a user of public funds is:

- a public law entity, or a unit thereof;
- a private law entity, if
  - it has received aid from the budget of the European Union, the state budget or the budget of a local authority;
  - it is a concession-holder;
  - it is a company, bank or insurance company in which the state or a local authority has a majority stake;
- a natural person who
  - has received aid from the budget of the European Union, the state budget or the budget of a local authority;
  - is carrying out a public service or securing public goods on the basis of a concession.

== Organisation of the Court of Audit ==
The Court of Audit of the Republic of Slovenia has three members: a president and two deputy presidents. They are appointed for a term of nine years on a proposal from the President of the Republic by the National Assembly by majority vote of all the deputies in a secret ballot. The President and the two Deputy Presidents form the Senate of the Court of Audit. Members of the Court of Audit may only be dismissed from office before the end of their term in the cases set out in the Court of Audit Act. This Act also lays down the procedure for their appointment and dismissal, as well as the special conditions which they must fulfill in order to ensure that the tasks are carried out professionally and impartially. The office of Member of the Court of Audit is incompatible with the holding of office or any other inclusion in the work of other state bodies and local authorities, with the holding of office in the bodies of political parties or trade unions, with the exercise of public powers of any kind, with membership of the management and supervisory bodies of commercial services, commercial public services, funds, institutes and co-operatives, and with the pursuit of any profession or gainful activity which under the law is incompatible with the holding of public office.

In addition to the Members the Court of Audit also has a maximum of six Supreme State Auditors, who head the audit departments and Secretary of the Court of Audit, who head the support services. They all have the status of public officials. They are appointed by the President of the Court of Audit for a term of nine years.

Members, Supreme State Auditors and Secretary of the Court of Audit may stand as candidates for the same office several times without restriction.

The Court of Audit is represented and headed by its president, who simultaneously holds the office of State Auditor-general.

== Strategy of the Court of Audit ==
The mission of the Court of Audit is to inform the public about important audit findings from the audits of state bodies and other public funds users in a timely and objective manner. Strategic goals of the Court of Audit are outlined in Court of Audit Strategy.
