= Igor Lukšič =

Slovenian politician

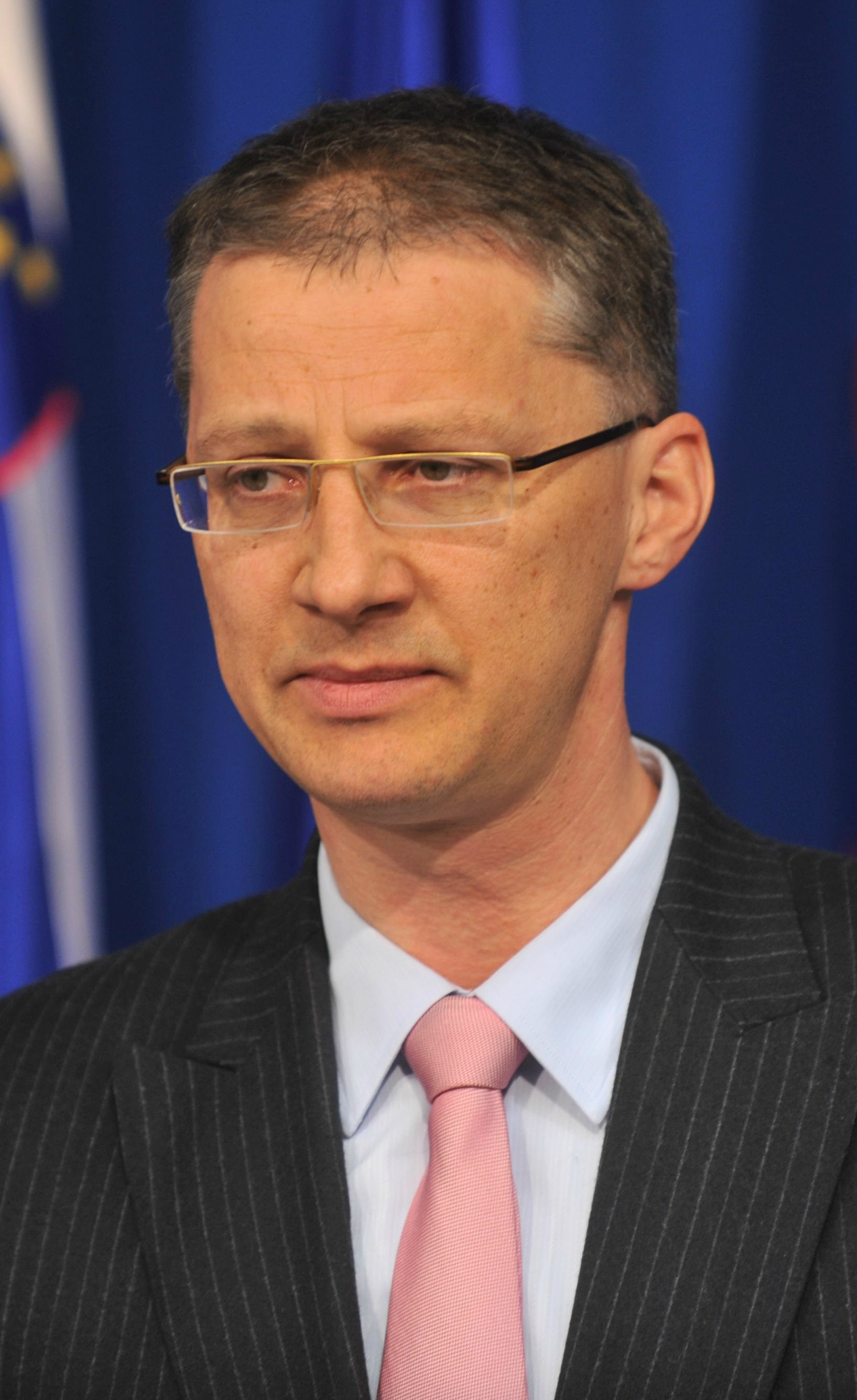

Minister for Education and Sports
- In office 21 November 2008 – 10 February 2012
- Prime Minister: Borut Pahor
- Preceded by: Milan Zver
- Succeeded by: Žiga Turk

Personal details
- Born: 31 March 1961 (age 65) Novo Mesto, FPR Yugoslavia (now Slovenia)
- Party: Social Democrats
- Education: University of Ljubljana

Igor Lukšič (born 3 December 1961) is a Slovenian political scientist, politician and was president of the Slovenian Social Democrats (June 2012 – May 2014). Between November 2008 and February 2012, he served as minister of education in the center-left government of Borut Pahor.

Lukšič was born in Novo Mesto in the People's Republic of Slovenia, then part of FPR Yugoslavia. He started his academic career as a teaching assistant at the Faculty of Social Sciences of the University of Ljubljana in 1986 and obtained his PhD at the University of Ljubljana in 1993. Subsequently, he became an assistant professor and later, in 1998, an associate professor. In 1999, he was named vice-dean and in 2001, dean of the Faculty of Social Sciences at the University of Ljubljana. Between 2008 and 2011, he worked as the minister of education and sport.

He was the vice president of Social Democrats until March 2009. Later, on 2 June 2012, he was elected president of the Social Democrats, but stepped down in 2014, after his party won only one MEP seat in European Parliament election.

== Books written ==
- Demokracija v pluralni družbi - Preverjanje veljavnosti konsociativne teorije (Democracy in a Plural Society), 1991
- Liberalizem versus korporativizem (Liberalism versus Corporativism), 1994, ISBN 961-6014-16-1
- Politični sistem Republike Slovenije (The Political System of the Republic of Slovenia), 2001, ISBN 961-6294-31-8

Political offices
Preceded by Milan Zver	Minister for Education and Sports; 2008–2012	Succeeded by Žiga Turk
Party political offices
Preceded by Borut Pahor	Leader of the Social Democrats; 2012–2014	Succeeded by Dejan Židan; Acting
