= Trojane =

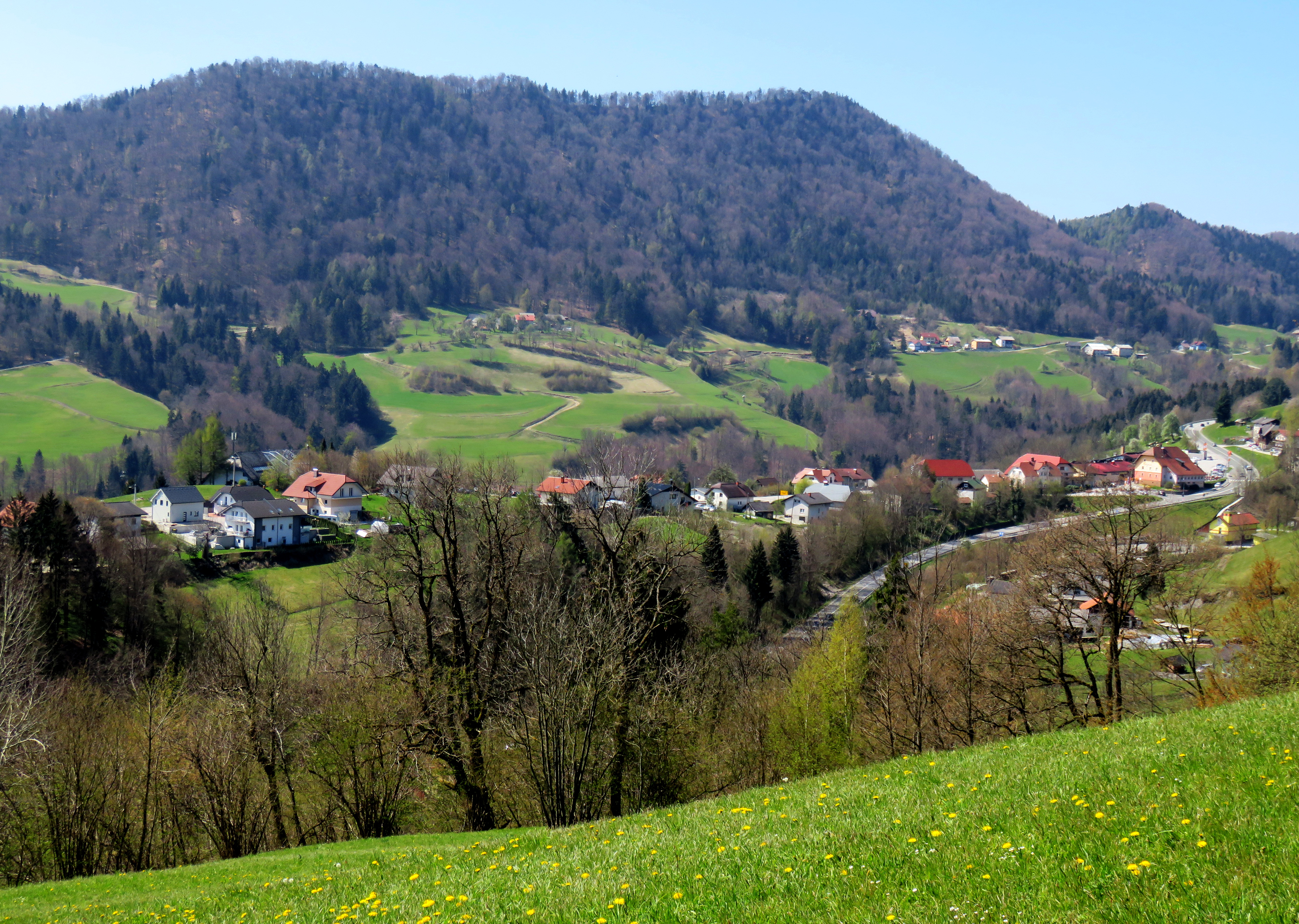

- Location in Slovenia
- Coordinates: 46°11′17.08″N 14°52′58.87″E
- Country: Slovenia
- Traditional region: Upper Carniola
- Statistical region: Central Slovenia
- Municipality: Lukovica

Area
  - Total: 0.88 km^{2} (0.34 sq mi)
- Elevation: 561.4 m (1,842 ft)

Population (2002)
  - Total: 103

Trojane (pronounced [tɾɔˈjaːnɛ]; Latin: Atrans, German: Trojana) is a settlement in the Municipality of Lukovica in central Slovenia. It lies in the northern part of the Sava Hills, on a hill near the border of two Slovene regions, Carniola and Styria. Until the freeway was finished in 2005, Trojane was on the main route from Ljubljana to Maribor.

== History ==
The Romans built a road on the route connecting Aquileia, Emona, Atrans, and Celeia. Trojane was an important way station, military post, and marketplace, and the town was surrounded by a defensive wall.

The archaeological remains of Atrans can be still seen in Trojane. In the Roman Empire, Trojane (Atrans) was on the border between Italy and the province of Noricum.

== Popular culture ==
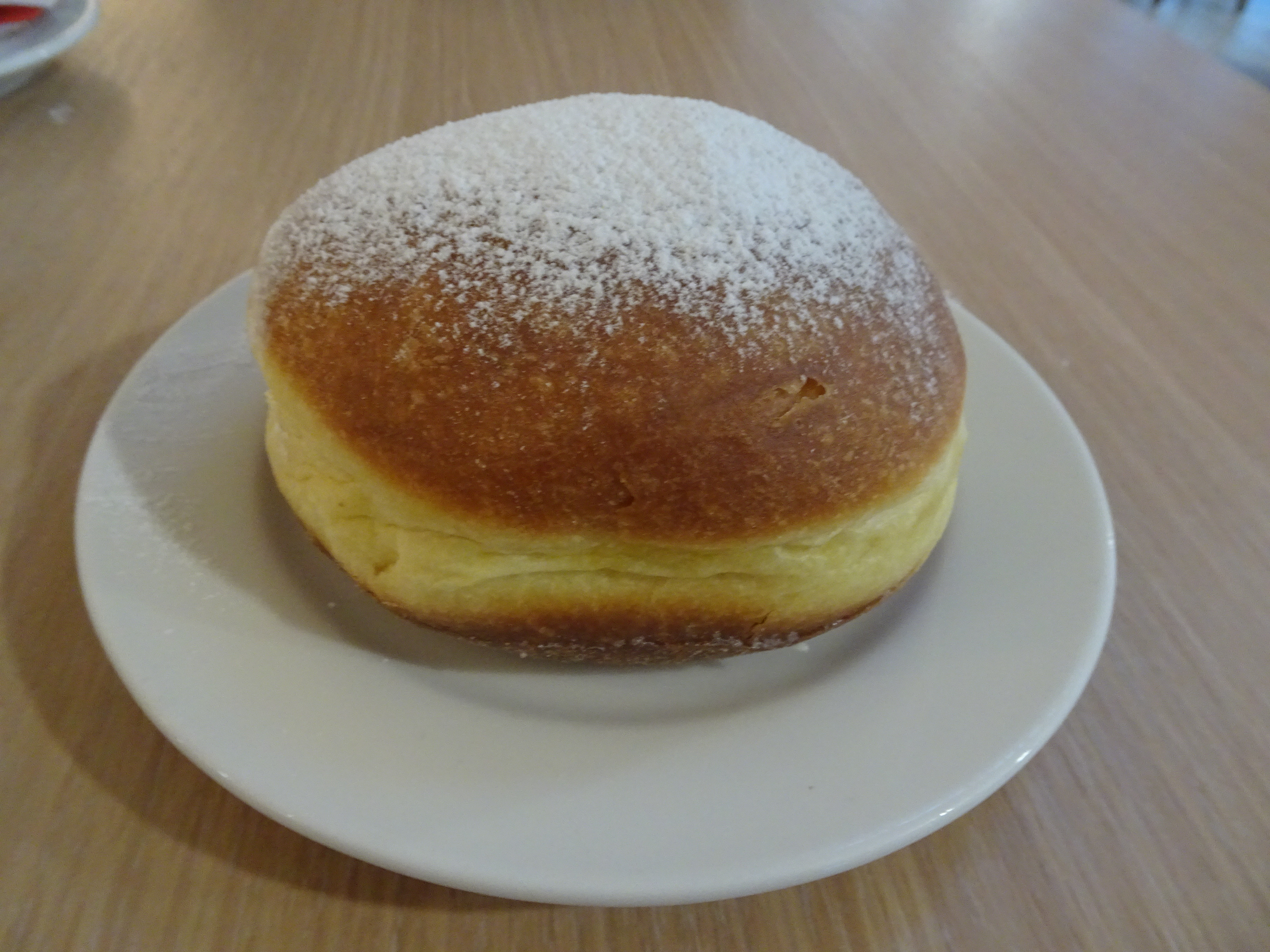
Trojane doughnut

Trojane is particularly known for the local restaurant's jelly doughnuts (Slovene: krofi), originally made with apricot jam filling. They also come in blueberry and chocolate flavour.
