= Milan Zver =

Slovenian Democratic Party politician and MEP

Milan Zver MEP
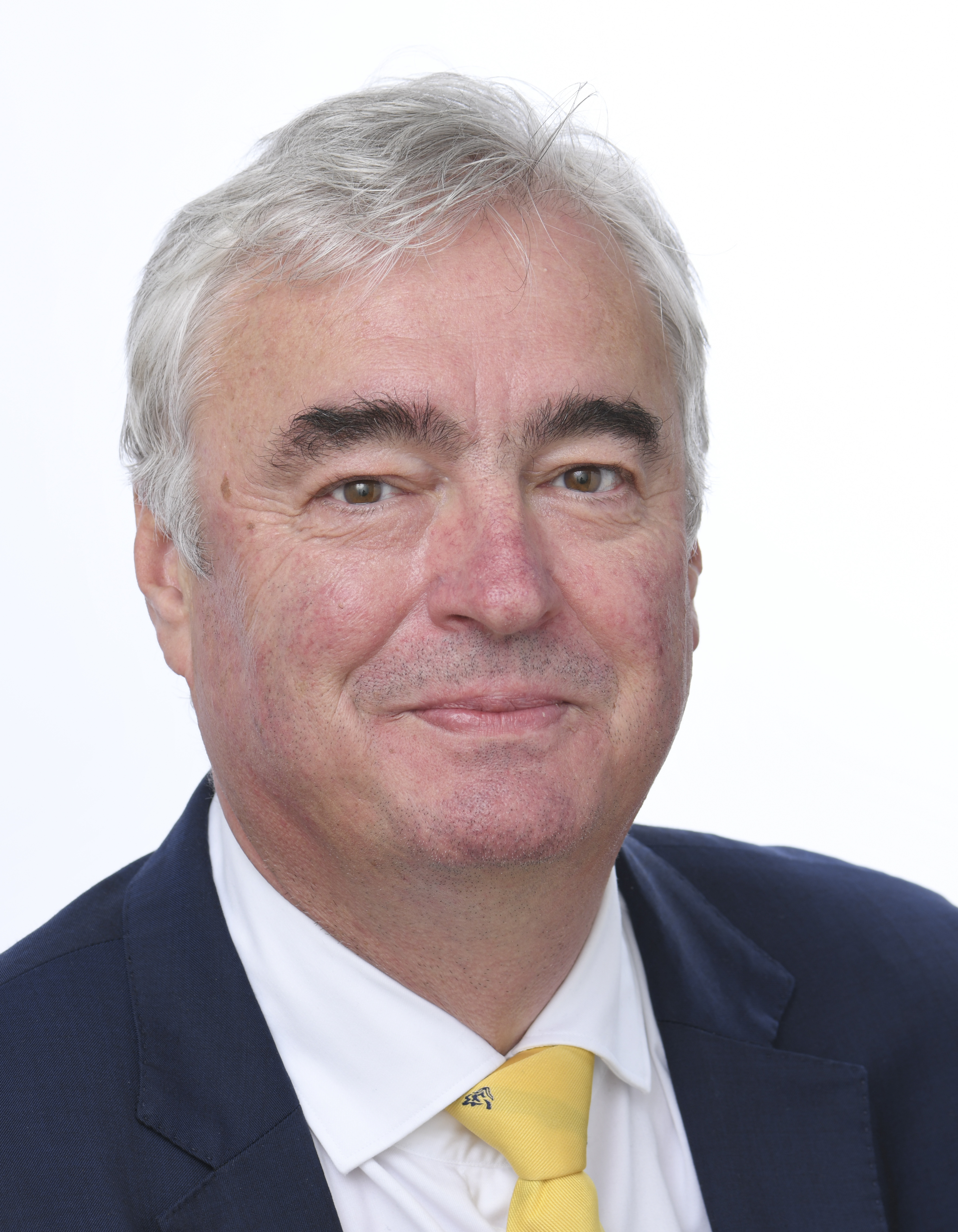

Member of the European Parliament
- Incumbent
- Assumed office 1 July 2009
- Constituency: Slovenia

Minister of Education and Sports
- In office 3 December 2004 – 21 November 2008
- Prime Minister: Janez Janša
- Preceded by: Slavko Gaber
- Succeeded by: Igor Lukšič

Member of the National Assembly
- In office 3 October 2004 – 1 July 2009

Personal details
- Born: 25 May 1962 (age 64) Ljubljana, Yugoslavia
- Party: Slovenian Democratic Party; European People's Party
- Education: University of Ljubljana; University of Graz
- Website: www.milanzver.eu

Milan Zver (born 25 May 1962) is a Slovenian politician and Member of the European Parliament (MEP) from Slovenia. He is a member of the Slovenian Democratic Party, part of the European People's Party. He is the vice-president of the Slovenian Democratic Party. He served as Minister of Education and Sports from 2004 to 2008.

He is a member of the Reconciliation of European Histories Group.

== Life and career ==
Zver was born in Ljubljana, FPR Yugoslavia, but spent most of his childhood in the village of Destrnik in the eastern Slovenian region of Styria. After finishing high school in Ptuj, he enrolled in the University of Ljubljana, where he studied sociology and political science at the Faculty of Social Sciences. He graduated in 1987 and continued his studies at the University of Graz under the supervision of the scholar Horst Haselsteiner. He obtained his MA in 1990, but in 1992 he left the research work at the university and decided to undertake public service in Slovenia instead. A member of Slovenian Social Democratic Party since 1990, Zver served as advisor to the Deputy Prime Minister Jože Pučnik and later to the Minister of Defence Janez Janša. After the Social Democratic Party left Janez Drnovšek's coalition government in 1994, Zver served as a secretary of the Municipal Council of Ljubljana until 1999, and later as an advisor to the parliamentary group of the Slovenian Social Democratic Party (now known as the Slovenian Democratic Party) in the National Assembly of Slovenia. From 2002 to 2004, he served as member of the Municipal Council of Ljubljana.

In 1998, Zver obtained his PhD at the University of Ljubljana under the supervision of historian Janko Prunk. The same year, he started teaching sociology at the University of Maribor. He has written several articles and monographs in political analysis and history of political thought.

In the 2004 parliamentary elections, Zver was elected to the Slovenian National Assembly. He left the Parliament shortly afterward in order to serve as the Minister of Education and Sports in the centre-right government led by Janez Janša. Until 2007, he also served as the chairman of the commission for the improvement of the conditions of the Romani community in Slovenia.

As the Minister of Sports, he attended the opening ceremony of the 2008 Summer Olympics as the representative for Slovenia.

== Recent activities ==
At the initiative of Milan Zver, the European Parliament announced on 11 June 2018 that a conference room will bear the name of Jože Pučnik. The official inauguration took place on 28 June 2018 in Brussels, where President of the European Parliament Antonio Tajani, Chairman of the EPP Group in the European Parliament Manfred Weber, President of Slovenia Borut Pahor, President of Slovenian Democratic Party Janez Janša and initiator Milan Zver were among the honorary speakers. Family of Jože Pučnik was present at the inauguration as well.

After the victory of the left-wing coalition led by Borut Pahor in the 2008 parliamentary elections, Zver was replaced by Igor Lukšič as Minister of Education of Sports.

In 2009, he was chosen to head the Slovenian Democratic Party's list of candidates to the European Parliament. The list obtained the highest procentage of votes in Slovenia, while Zver received the highest number of preferential votes in the country, resulting in the election to the European Parliament.

Zver has been member of several executive bodies of the Slovenian Democratic Party (SDS) since 1992, at first as an adviser and subsequently as a member. He is currently vice president of the party. He has also been active on the international political scene, mostly within the European People's Party and in conservative think tanks such as the International Republican Institute and the Konrad Adenauer Foundation.

He is a signatory of the Prague Declaration on European Conscience and Communism.

== Private life ==
Zver is married with two daughters. One, Manca Zver is a model and television host. Zver is also an amateur football player. Besides Slovene, he is fluent in English, German and Serbo-Croatian. He has been married twice. His current wife is the Slovenian historian Andreja Valič Zver.

== Selected bibliography ==
- Koncepcija demokracije pri Slovenskih socialistih med obema vojnama ("Concepts of Democracy among Slovenian Socialists in the Interwar Period"; Ljubljana, 1988);
- In dan bo sijal: politične razprave ("And the Day Shall Shine: Political Essays"; Ljubljana, 1996);
- Sto let socialdemokracije na Slovenskem ("Hundred Years of Social Democracy in the Slovene Lands"; Ljubljana, 1996);
- Demokracija v klasični slovenski politični misli ("The Notion of Democracy in the Classical Slovenian Political Thought"; Ljubljana, 2002);
- 'Pučnikova znanstvena in politična misel' ("The Scientific and Political Thought of Jože Pučnik", editor; Ljubljana, 2004).

Political offices
Preceded by Slavko Gaber	Minister of Education and Sports; 2004–2008	Succeeded by Igor Lukšič
