= Ljubljana Center (National Assembly constituency) =

Constituency in Slovenia

- Constituency for the National Assembly
- Location of Ljubljana Center within Slovenia
- Municipality: List: Bloke; Borovnica; Brezovica; Cerknica; Dobrova–Polhov Gradec; Horjul; Ig; Ljubljana (part); Log-Dragomer; Logatec; Loška Dolina; Medvode; Škofljica; Velike Lašče; Vodice; Vrhnika
- Electorate: 221,727 (2022)

Current Constituency
- Created: 1992
- Seats: 11 (1992–present)
- Deputies: List: Iva Dimic (NSi); Luka Goršek (SD); Aleš Hojs (SDS); Alenka Jeraj (SDS); Andrej Klemenc (Svoboda); Luka Mesec (Levica); Zoran Mojškerc (SDS); Lucija Tacer Perlin (Svoboda); Tamara Vonta (Svoboda); Duško Vujanović (Svoboda); Dejan Zakrajšek (D)
- Electoral districts: List: Ljubljana Center; Ljubljana Šiška 1; Ljubljana Šiška 2; Ljubljana Šiška 3; Ljubljana Šiška 4; Ljubljana Vič-Rudnik 1; Ljubljana Vič-Rudnik 2; Ljubljana Vič-Rudnik 3; Ljubljana Vič-Rudnik 4; Logatec; Vrhnika

Ljubljana Center, officially known as the 3rd constituency (Slovene: 3. volilna enota), is one of the eight multi-member constituencies (electoral units) of the National Assembly, the national legislature of Slovenia. The constituency was established in 1992 following Slovenia's independence from Yugoslavia. It consists of the municipalities of Bloke, Borovnica, Brezovica, Cerknica, Dobrova–Polhov Gradec, Horjul, Ig, Log-Dragomer, Logatec, Loška Dolina, Medvode, Škofljica, Velike Lašče, Vodice and Vrhnika, and parts of the municipality of Ljubljana. The constituency currently elects 11 of the 90 members of the National Assembly using the open party-list proportional representation electoral system. At the 2026 parliamentary election the constituency had 221,727 registered electors.

== History ==
The 3rd constituency (Ljubljana Center) was one of the eight constituencies established by the Determination of Constituencies for the Election of Deputies to the National Assembly Act (ZDVEDZ) (Zakon o določitvi volilnih enot za volitve poslancev v državni zbor (ZDVEDZ)) passed by the Assembly of the Republic of Slovenia (Skupščina Republike Slovenije) in September 1992. It consisted of the municipalities of Cerknica, Ljubljana Center, Ljubljana Vič-Rudnik, Ljubljana Šiška, Logatec and Vrhnika.

Following the re-organisation of municipalities in October 1994, parts of Cerknica municipality were transferred to the newly created Loška Dolina municipality; Ljubljana-Center municipality was transferred to the newly created Ljubljana municipality; Ljubljana Vič-Rudnik municipality was transferred to the newly created municipalities of Brezovica, Dobrova–Horjul–Polhov Gradec, Ig, Ljubljana, Medvode, Škofljica and Velike Lašče; Ljubljana Šiška municipality was transferred to the newly created municipalities of Ljubljana, Medvode and Vodice; and parts of Vrhnika municipality were transferred to the newly created Borovnica municipality.

In August 1998 parts of Loška Dolina municipality were transferred to the newly created Bloke municipality whilst Dobrova–Horjul–Polhov Gradec municipality was split into the municipalities of Dobrova–Polhov Gradec and Horjul. Log-Dragomer municipality was created from parts of Vrhnika municipality in June 2006.

In February 2021 the National Assembly passed Amendments and Supplements to the Determination of Constituencies for the Election of Deputies to the National Assembly Act (ZDVEDZ-B) (Zakon o spremembah in dopolnitvah Zakona o določitvi volilnih enot za volitve poslancev v državni zbor (ZDVEDZ-B)) which defined the Ljubljana Center constituency as consisting of the municipalities of Bloke, Borovnica, Brezovica, Cerknica, Dobrova–Polhov Gradec, Horjul, Ig, Log-Dragomer, Logatec, Loška Dolina, Medvode, Škofljica, Velike Lašče, Vodice and Vrhnika, and parts of the municipality of Ljubljana.

== Electoral system ==
Ljubljana Center currently elects 11 of the 90 members of the National Assembly using the open party-list proportional representation electoral system. Each constituency is divided into 11 electoral districts (volilni okraji) in which each party stands a single candidate. Electors vote for a candidate of their choice in their electoral district and then the votes received by each party's candidates are aggregated at the constituency level.

Allocation of seats was carried out in two stages. In the first stage, seats are allocated to parties at the constituency level using the Droop quota (Hare quota prior to 2006). In the second stage, unallocated seats from the first stage are aggregated at the national level and allocated to parties using the D'Hondt method (any seats won by the party at the constituency level are subtracted from the party's national seats). Though calculated nationally, national seats are allocated at the constituency level.

Since 2000, only parties that reach the 4% national threshold compete for seats at both constituency and national levels. Prior to this there was no threshold at the constituency level but parties needed to reach 3/88 (c3.4%) to compete for seats at the national level.

Seats won by each party in a constituency are allocated to the candidates with the highest percentage of votes. As a consequence, multiple candidates may be elected from an electoral district whilst others may have no candidates elected. Prior to 2000 parties had the option to have up to 50% of their national seats allocated in the order they appear on their party list (closed list).

== Electoral districts ==
Ljubljana Center is divided into 11 electoral districts:

- 1. Logatec - municipalities of Bloke, Cerknica, Logatec and Loška Dolina.
- 2. Vrhnika - municipalities of Borovnica, Log-Dragomer and Vrhnika.
- 3. Ljubljana Vič-Rudnik 1 - municipalities of Brezovica (except Brezovica pri Ljubljani), Ig, Ljubljana (Črna Vas, Lipe and parts of Ljubljana only), Škofljica (except Lavrica and Orle) and Velike Lašče.
- 4. Ljubljana Vič-Rudnik 2 - municipalities of Ljubljana (parts of Ljubljana only) and Škofljica (Lavrica and Orle only).
- 5. Ljubljana Vič-Rudnik 3 - municipality of Ljubljana (parts of Ljubljana only).
- 6. Ljubljana Vič-Rudnik 4 - municipalities of Brezovica (Brezovica pri Ljubljani only), Dobrova–Polhov Gradec, Horjul and Ljubljana (parts of Ljubljana only).
- 7. Ljubljana Center - municipality of Ljubljana (parts of Ljubljana only).
- 8. Ljubljana Šiška 1 - municipality of Ljubljana (parts of Ljubljana only).
- 9. Ljubljana Šiška 2 - municipality of Ljubljana (Toško Čelo and parts of Ljubljana only).
- 10. Ljubljana Šiška 3 - municipality of Ljubljana (parts of Ljubljana only).
- 11. Ljubljana Šiška 4 - municipalities of Ljubljana (Dvor, Medno, Rašica, Spodnje Gameljne, Srednje Gameljne, Stanežiče, Zgornje Gameljne and parts of Ljubljana only), Medvode and Vodice.

== Election results ==
=== Summary ===
Election	Left Levica / ZL / TRS			Social Democrats SD / ZLSD / ZL			Freedom Movement Svoboda			Positive Slovenia PS / LZJ-PS			Liberal Democracy LDS			Let's Connect PoS / SMC			Slovenian People's SLS / SLS-SKD / SLS-SMS			Christian Democrats SKD			New Slovenia NSi			Slovenian Democrats SDS / SDSS			Slovenian Nationalists SNS		
Election	Votes	%	Seats	Votes	%	Seats	Votes	%	Seats	Votes	%	Seats	Votes	%	Seats	Votes	%	Seats	Votes	%	Seats	Votes	%	Seats	Votes	%	Seats	Votes	%	Seats	Votes	%	Seats
2026	15,639	9.69%	1	10,039	6.22%	0	46,943	29.10%	3										with NSi						14,065	8.72%	1	38,065	23.59%	2	2,398	1.49%	0
2022	11,305	6.89%	0	10,146	6.18%	0	62,485	38.09%	4							4,405	2.69%	0	with PoS						11,261	6.86%	0	31,987	19.50%	2	1,436	0.88%	0
2018	16,847	13.57%	1	11,023	8.88%	1										14,483	11.66%	1	1,404	1.13%	0				9,285	7.48%	0	28,031	22.57%	2	3,306	2.66%	0
2014	9,163	7.52%	0	5,701	4.68%	0				5,579	4.58%	0				45,787	37.60%	4	2,670	2.19%	0				7,501	6.16%	0	24,899	20.45%	2	1,706	1.40%	0
2011				14,350	9.51%	1				61,584	40.81%	4	1,330	0.88%	0				6,315	4.18%	0				8,131	5.39%	0	34,088	22.59%	2	1,679	1.11%	0
2008				55,221	38.58%	4							6,604	4.61%	0				3,243	2.27%	0	819	0.57%	0	6,005	4.19%	0	38,862	27.15%	3	5,413	3.78%	0
2004				14,795	11.50%	1							32,984	25.64%	3				4,080	3.17%	0				13,524	10.51%	1	38,945	30.27%	3	6,306	4.90%	0
2000				18,228	12.88%	1							54,959	38.83%	4				7,504	5.30%	0	with SLS			14,327	10.12%	1	25,161	17.78%	2	5,312	3.75%	0
1996				15,635	11.11%	1							37,104	26.37%	2				25,479	18.11%	1	12,051	8.57%	0				23,305	16.57%	1	5,947	4.23%	0
1992				21,041	13.92%	1							33,954	22.46%	2				10,509	6.95%	0	21,959	14.52%	1				3,773	2.50%	0	22,203	14.69%	1

(Excludes national seats. Figures in italics represent alliances/joint lists.)

=== Detailed ===
Party has received at least 4% of the vote nationally (since 2000).

==== 2020s ====
===== 2026 =====
Results of the 2026 parliamentary election held on 22 March 2026:

Party		Votes per electoral district											Total votes	%	Seats		
Party		Ljubljana Center	Ljubljana Šiška 1	Ljubljana Šiška 2	Ljubljana Šiška 3	Ljubljana Šiška 4	Ljubljana Vič- Rudnik 1	Ljubljana Vič- Rudnik 2	Ljubljana Vič- Rudnik 3	Ljubljana Vič- Rudnik 4	Logatec	Vrhnika	Total votes	%	Con.	Nat.	Tot.
Freedom Movement	Svoboda	4,083	3,141	4,216	3,895	4,770	5,377	3,931	3,964	4,148	4,772	4,646	46,943	29.10%	3	1	4
Slovenian Democratic Party	SDS	2,315	1,513	2,287	2,451	4,531	5,705	2,533	2,271	5,005	5,407	4,047	38,065	23.59%	2	1	3
The Left and Vesna – Green Party	Levica-Vesna	2,681	1,600	1,720	1,278	1,177	1,139	1,305	1,499	1,359	899	982	15,639	9.69%	1	0	1
New Slovenia – Christian Democrats, Slovenian People's Party and Focus	NSi-SLS- FOKUS	828	524	766	942	2,049	2,008	994	744	1,506	2,321	1,383	14,065	8.72%	1	0	1
Democrats	D	883	582	908	846	1,307	1,525	993	857	1,418	1,541	923	11,783	7.30%	0	1	1
Social Democrats	SD	910	644	1,078	788	1,105	1,137	704	848	907	1,064	854	10,039	6.22%	0	1	1
Resni.ca	Resni.ca	431	459	583	585	898	1,040	603	518	679	878	762	7,436	4.61%	0	0	0
Prerod	Prerod	471	394	523	461	710	831	502	550	625	614	557	6,238	3.87%	0	0	0
Pirate Party	Pirati	527	436	482	477	514	559	408	434	512	440	482	5,271	3.27%	0	0	0
Slovenian National Party	SNS	99	102	152	157	340	352	132	128	242	415	279	2,398	1.49%	0	0	0
We, Socialists!	MI!	192	98	98	63	83	95	75	108	109	85	62	1,068	0.66%	0	0	0
Alternative for Slovenia	AzaS	99	46	71	62	109	122	48	69	84	78	85	873	0.54%	0	0	0
Greens of Slovenia and Party of Generations	ZS-SG	47	43	44	47	98	69	48	52	66	51	211	776	0.48%	0	0	0
Voice of Pensioners	GU	21	28	31	24	52	47	25	41	27	46	41	383	0.24%	0	0	0
Karl Erjavec - Trust Party	SZ	27	24	42	34	46	30	26	37	37	42	20	365	0.23%	0	0	0
Valid votes		13,614	9,634	13,001	12,110	17,789	20,036	12,327	12,120	16,724	18,653	15,334	161,342	100.00%	7	4	11
Rejected votes		109	72	98	98	139	150	74	82	129	157	140	1,248	0.77%			
Total polled		13,723	9,706	13,099	12,208	17,928	20,186	12,401	12,202	16,853	18,810	15,474	162,590	73.33%			
Registered electors		22,187	13,880	18,162	16,753	23,065	26,319	17,050	16,495	22,131	25,271	20,414	221,727				
Turnout		61.85%	69.93%	72.12%	72.87%	77.73%	76.70%	72.73%	73.97%	76.15%	74.43%	75.80%	73.33%				

The following candidates were elected:

- Constituency seats - Iva Dimic (NSi-SLS-FOKUS, Logatec), 2,321 votes; Aleš Hojs (SDS, Vič-Rudnik 4), 5,005 votes; Andrej Klemenc (Svoboda, Šiška 1), 3,141 votes; Luka Mesec (Levica-Vesna, Center & Šiška 1), 4,281 votes; Zoran Mojškerc (SDS, Logatec), 5,407 votes; Tamara Vonta (Svoboda, Vič-Rudnik 3), 3,964 votes; and Duško Vujanović (Svoboda, Šiška 2), 4,216 votes.
- National seats - Luka Goršek (SD, Šiška 2), 1,078 votes; Alenka Jeraj (SDS, Vič-Rudnik 1), 5,705 votes; Tadej Ostrc (D, Vič Rudnik 4), 1,418 votes; and Lucija Tacer Perlin (Svoboda, Šiška 3), 3,895 votes.

Substitutions:

- Tadej Ostrc (D, Vič Rudnik 4) forfeited his seat on 4 June 2026 upon being elected to the government and was replaced by Dejan Zakrajšek (D, Vič Rudnik 1) on 9 June 2026.

===== 2022 =====
Results of the 2022 parliamentary election held on 24 April 2022:

Party		Votes per electoral district											Total votes	%	Seats		
Party		Ljubljana Center	Ljubljana Šiška 1	Ljubljana Šiška 2	Ljubljana Šiška 3	Ljubljana Šiška 4	Ljubljana Vič- Rudnik 1	Ljubljana Vič- Rudnik 2	Ljubljana Vič- Rudnik 3	Ljubljana Vič- Rudnik 4	Logatec	Vrhnika	Total votes	%	Con.	Nat.	Tot.
Freedom Movement	Svoboda	5,461	4,500	5,389	5,330	6,641	7,054	5,199	5,099	5,811	6,128	5,873	62,485	38.09%	4	1	5
Slovenian Democratic Party	SDS	2,158	1,302	1,865	2,112	3,657	4,639	2,142	1,922	4,269	4,580	3,341	31,987	19.50%	2	1	3
The Left	Levica	2,123	1,074	1,235	905	759	751	932	1,083	1,030	702	711	11,305	6.89%	0	1	1
New Slovenia – Christian Democrats	NSi	747	427	693	717	1,533	1,513	762	651	1,192	1,937	1,089	11,261	6.86%	0	1	1
Social Democrats	SD	939	690	1,172	836	912	997	759	992	893	1,140	816	10,146	6.18%	0	1	1
List of Marjan Šarec	LMŠ	518	416	549	543	771	690	508	495	628	657	665	6,440	3.93%	0	0	0
Party of Alenka Bratušek	SAB	547	369	542	472	570	565	442	528	467	429	439	5,370	3.27%	0	0	0
Let's Connect Slovenia	PoS	303	167	259	309	420	736	286	281	467	774	403	4,405	2.69%	0	0	0
Resni.ca		198	172	313	306	506	561	226	235	299	367	353	3,536	2.16%	0	0	0
Pirate Party		318	243	251	246	386	391	270	251	353	320	311	3,340	2.04%	0	0	0
Our Future and Good Country	SNP-DD	275	260	321	241	285	509	227	233	260	240	281	3,132	1.91%	0	0	0
For a Healthy Society	ZSi	241	173	216	225	317	353	229	189	312	414	349	3,018	1.84%	0	0	0
Vesna – Green Party		278	185	237	215	291	287	193	245	256	212	262	2,661	1.62%	0	0	0
Slovenian National Party	SNS	92	59	88	95	186	244	104	78	141	201	148	1,436	0.88%	0	0	0
Our Country		66	59	74	83	172	138	55	54	172	274	129	1,276	0.78%	0	0	0
For the People of Slovenia	ZLS	45	55	76	74	108	136	50	64	78	84	117	887	0.54%	0	0	0
Democratic Party of Pensioners of Slovenia	DeSUS	42	33	53	37	66	60	38	49	41	55	46	520	0.32%	0	0	0
List of Boris Popovič – Let's Digitize Slovenia	LBP	21	23	45	30	67	63	37	36	33	95	67	517	0.32%	0	0	0
Homeland League	DOM	26	31	33	25	33	51	33	28	28	26	23	337	0.21%	0	0	0
Valid votes		14,398	10,238	13,411	12,801	17,680	19,738	12,492	12,513	16,730	18,635	15,423	164,059	100.00%	6	5	11
Rejected votes		66	44	79	66	133	151	78	76	117	159	123	1,092	0.66%			
Total polled		14,464	10,282	13,490	12,867	17,813	19,889	12,570	12,589	16,847	18,794	15,546	165,151	75.24%			
Registered electors		22,220	14,089	18,149	16,955	22,472	25,494	16,849	16,336	21,800	25,039	20,084	219,487				
Turnout		65.09%	72.98%	74.33%	75.89%	79.27%	78.01%	74.60%	77.06%	77.28%	75.06%	77.40%	75.24%				

The following candidates were elected:

- Constituency seats - Robert Golob (Svoboda, Center & Šiška 1), 9,961 votes; Urška Klakočar Zupančič (Svoboda, Šiška 3), 5,330 votes; Anže Logar (SDS, Vič-Rudnik 4), 4,269 votes; Zoran Mojškerc (SDS, Logatec), 4,580 votes; Mojca Šetinc Pašek (Svoboda, Vič-Rudnik 2), 5,199 votes; and Lucija Tacer Perlin (Svoboda, Vič-Rudnik 3), 5,099 votes.
- National seats - Iva Dimic (NSi, Logatec), 1,937 votes; Tanja Fajon (SD, Šiška 2), 1,172 votes; Alenka Jeraj (SDS, Vič-Rudnik 1), 4,639 votes; Luka Mesec (Levica, Center), 2,123 votes; and Lenart Žavbi (Svoboda, Šiška 2), 5,389 votes.

Substitutions:

- Robert Golob (Svoboda, Center & Šiška 1) forfeited his seat on 25 May 2022 upon being elected Prime Minister and was replaced by Bojan Čebela (Svoboda, Vrhnika) on 1 June 2022.
- Tanja Fajon (SD, Šiška 2) forfeited her seat on 1 June 2022 upon being elected to the government and was replaced by Jonas Žnidaršič (SD, Vič-Rudnik 3) on 9 June 2022.
- Luka Mesec (Levica, Center) forfeited his seat on 1 June 2022 upon being elected to the government and was replaced by Milan Jakopovič (Levica, Vič-Rudnik 3) on 9 June 2022.

==== 2010s ====
===== 2018 =====
Results of the 2018 parliamentary election held on 3 June 2018:

Party		Votes per electoral district											Total votes	%	Seats		
Party		Ljubljana Center	Ljubljana Šiška 1	Ljubljana Šiška 2	Ljubljana Šiška 3	Ljubljana Šiška 4	Ljubljana Vič- Rudnik 1	Ljubljana Vič- Rudnik 2	Ljubljana Vič- Rudnik 3	Ljubljana Vič- Rudnik 4	Logatec	Vrhnika	Total votes	%	Con.	Nat.	Tot.
Slovenian Democratic Party	SDS	1,943	1,250	1,759	2,025	3,042	3,940	1,924	1,777	3,715	3,872	2,784	28,031	22.57%	2	1	3
The Left	Levica	2,769	1,509	1,754	1,377	1,276	1,306	1,417	1,566	1,458	1,238	1,177	16,847	13.57%	1	0	1
List of Marjan Šarec	LMŠ	910	881	1,108	1,240	2,092	1,927	1,066	1,007	1,496	1,989	1,707	15,423	12.42%	1	1	2
Modern Centre Party	SMC	1,408	1,040	1,416	1,234	1,391	1,422	1,287	1,656	1,308	1,206	1,115	14,483	11.66%	1	1	2
Social Democrats	SD	1,218	799	1,129	923	978	1,096	829	841	908	1,137	1,165	11,023	8.88%	1	0	1
New Slovenia – Christian Democrats	NSi	658	375	584	591	1,202	1,014	663	566	971	1,753	908	9,285	7.48%	0	1	1
Party of Alenka Bratušek	SAB	788	544	776	692	793	711	560	744	601	534	594	7,337	5.91%	0	1	1
Democratic Party of Pensioners of Slovenia	DeSUS	441	495	575	453	460	528	464	445	357	527	455	5,200	4.19%	0	0	0
Pirate Party		446	257	312	319	359	371	319	319	328	347	359	3,736	3.01%	0	0	0
Slovenian National Party	SNS	171	183	213	258	438	454	231	228	319	432	379	3,306	2.66%	0	0	0
Good Country	DD	197	125	199	213	252	290	158	183	192	190	184	2,183	1.76%	0	0	0
Slovenian People's Party	SLS	67	31	50	53	200	336	67	50	180	268	102	1,404	1.13%	0	0	0
List of Journalist Bojan Požar	LNBP	117	90	112	103	132	139	100	105	138	106	100	1,242	1.00%	0	0	0
For a Healthy Society	ZD	68	69	68	79	138	101	95	59	78	120	102	977	0.79%	0	0	0
Andrej Čuš and Greens of Slovenia	AČZS	71	49	68	57	117	96		54	65	79	96	752	0.61%	0	0	0
United Left and Unity	ZLS	67	60	69	38	56	62	62	55	68	42	63	642	0.52%	0	0	0
Movement Together Forward	GSN	41	49	39	36	62	54	55	49	35	48	59	527	0.42%	0	0	0
United Slovenia	ZSi	26	35	47	31	52	50	23	28	61	64	55	472	0.38%	0	0	0
Economic Active Party	GAS	59	30	29	25	54	51	27	28	42	74	48	467	0.38%	0	0	0
Solidarity–For a Fair Society!		45	23	23	19	42	56	19	18	15	48	23	331	0.27%	0	0	0
Socialist Party of Slovenia	SPS	22	18	24	30	15	19	19	21	22	29	31	250	0.20%	0	0	0
United Right (Voice for Children and Families and New People's Party of Slovenia)		5	5	11	4	41	9	4	11	19	16	6	131	0.11%	0	0	0
Party of Slovenian People	SSN	14	10	3	14	10	24	8	8	9	12	12	124	0.10%	0	0	0
Valid votes		11,551	7,927	10,368	9,814	13,202	14,056	9,397	9,818	12,385	14,131	11,524	124,173	100.00%	6	5	11
Rejected votes		113	81	89	70	144	140	83	69	118	169	122	1,198	0.96%			
Total polled		11,664	8,008	10,457	9,884	13,346	14,196	9,480	9,887	12,503	14,300	11,646	125,371	57.28%			
Registered electors		22,385	14,397	18,497	17,113	22,008	24,837	16,887	16,601	21,334	24,977	19,824	218,860				
Turnout		52.11%	55.62%	56.53%	57.76%	60.64%	57.16%	56.14%	59.56%	58.61%	57.25%	58.75%	57.28%				

The following candidates were elected:

- Constituency seats - Miro Cerar (SMC, Vič-Rudnik 3), 1,656 votes; Alenka Jeraj (SDS, Vič-Rudnik 1), 3,940 votes; Marko Koprivc (SD, Šiška 2), 1,129 votes; Jerca Korče (LMŠ, Logatec), 1,989 votes; Anže Logar (SDS, Vič-Rudnik 4), 3,715 votes; and Violeta Tomić (Levica, Center), 2,769 votes.
- National seats - Peter Jožef Česnik (SAB, Vič-Rudnik 3), 744 votes; Iva Dimic (NSi, Logatec), 1,753 votes; Monika Gregorčič (SMC, Vič-Rudnik 2), 1,287 votes; Andrej Šircelj (SDS, Logatec & Vrhnika), 5,579 votes; and Andreja Zabret (LMŠ, Šiška 1 & Šiška 4), 2,973 votes.

Substitutions:

- Miro Cerar (SMC, Vič-Rudnik 3) forfeited his seat on 13 September 2018 upon being elected to the government and was replaced by Jani Möderndorfer (SMC, Šiška 2) on 26 September 2018.
- Peter Jožef Česnik (SAB, Vič-Rudnik 3) forfeited his seat on 13 September 2018 upon being elected to the government and was replaced by Maša Kociper (SAB, Šiška 2) on 26 September 2018.
- Jani Möderndorfer (SMC, Šiška 2) forfeited his seat on 13 March 2020 when Miro Cerar (SMC, Vič-Rudnik 3) lost his government position, regaining his seat.
- Maša Kociper (SAB, Šiška 2) forfeited his seat on 13 March 2020 when Peter Jožef Česnik (SAB, Vič-Rudnik 3) lost his government position, regaining his seat.
- Miro Cerar (SMC, Vič-Rudnik 3) resigned on 13 March 2020 and was replaced by Jani Möderndorfer (SMC, Šiška 2) on 19 March 2020.
- Peter Jožef Česnik (SAB, Vič-Rudnik 3) resigned on 13 March 2020 and was replaced by Maša Kociper (SAB, Šiška 2) on 19 March 2020.
- Anže Logar (SDS, Vič-Rudnik 4) forfeited his seat on 13 March 2020 upon being elected to the government and was replaced by Leon Merjasec (SDS, Šiška 4) on 19 March 2020.
- Andrej Šircelj (SDS, Logatec & Vrhnika) forfeited his seat on 13 March 2020 upon being elected to the government and was replaced by Mojca Škrinjar (SDS, Šiška 3) on 19 March 2020.

===== 2014 =====
Results of the 2014 parliamentary election held on 13 July 2014:

Party		Votes per electoral district											Total votes	%	Seats		
Party		Ljubljana Center	Ljubljana Šiška 1	Ljubljana Šiška 2	Ljubljana Šiška 3	Ljubljana Šiška 4	Ljubljana Vič- Rudnik 1	Ljubljana Vič- Rudnik 2	Ljubljana Vič- Rudnik 3	Ljubljana Vič- Rudnik 4	Cerknica- Logatec	Vrhnika	Total votes	%	Con.	Nat.	Tot.
Modern Centre Party	SMC	4,468	3,293	4,194	3,854	4,683	4,741	3,570	4,171	4,106	4,531	4,176	45,787	37.60%	4	1	5
Slovenian Democratic Party	SDS	1,840	1,140	1,521	1,838	2,700	3,394	1,785	1,658	3,140	3,530	2,353	24,899	20.45%	2	0	2
United Left	ZL	1,421	779	855	762	711	777	739	799	829	758	733	9,163	7.52%	0	1	1
Democratic Party of Pensioners of Slovenia	DeSUS	504	621	783	646	868	998	578	690	671	843	877	8,079	6.63%	0	1	1
New Slovenia – Christian Democrats	NSi	601	296	417	498	887	736	462	394	1,031	1,427	752	7,501	6.16%	0	1	1
Alliance of Alenka Bratušek	ZaAB	689	468	652	540	628	498	497	502	501	653	423	6,051	4.97%	0	1	1
Social Democrats	SD	673	491	656	471	512	497	376	473	428	625	499	5,701	4.68%	0	0	0
Positive Slovenia	PS	685	494	597	568	481	552	695	451	351	324	381	5,579	4.58%	0	0	0
Slovenian People's Party	SLS	120	74	119	131	281	572	136	127	302	519	289	2,670	2.19%	0	0	0
Pirate Party		224	188	163	208	225	222	160	146	199	0	246	1,981	1.63%	0	0	0
Slovenian National Party	SNS	82	102	102	125	235	253	111	100	163	233	200	1,706	1.40%	0	0	0
Verjamem		76	78	90	72	122	81	72	78	116	120	72	977	0.80%	0	0	0
Civic List	DL	62	56	81	62	95	57	54	62	76	204	73	882	0.72%	0	0	0
Greens of Slovenia	ZS	64	39	46	45	67	48	52	52	51	70	46	580	0.48%	0	0	0
Equal Land–Forward Slovenia	ED-NPS	18	17	14	19	0	28	14	14	22	43	25	214	0.18%	0	0	0
Valid votes		11,527	8,136	10,290	9,839	12,495	13,454	9,301	9,717	11,986	13,880	11,145	121,770	100.00%	6	5	11
Rejected votes		134	69	120	95	167	186	94	64	133	205	147	1,414	1.15%			
Total polled		11,661	8,205	10,410	9,934	12,662	13,640	9,395	9,781	12,119	14,085	11,292	123,184	57.13%			
Registered electors		22,173	14,758	18,248	17,197	21,436	23,914	16,715	16,278	20,890	24,596	19,431	215,636				
Turnout		52.59%	55.60%	57.05%	57.77%	59.07%	57.04%	56.21%	60.09%	58.01%	57.27%	58.11%	57.13%				

The following candidates were elected:

- Constituency seats - Miro Cerar (SMC, Vič-Rudnik 3), 4,171 votes; Tanja Cink (SMC, Šiška 2), 4,194 votes; Simona Kustec (SMC, Šiška 1), 3,293 votes; Anže Logar (SDS, Vič-Rudnik 4), 3,140 votes; Andrej Šircelj (SDS, Cerknica-Logatec), 3,530 votes; and Simon Zajc (SMC, Šiška 3), 3,854 votes.
- National seats - Iva Dimic (NSi, Cerknica-Logatec), 1,427 votes; Primož Hainz (DeSUS, Vrhnika), 877 votes; Mitja Horvat (SMC, Vič-Rudnik 2), 3,570 votes; Violeta Tomić (ZL, Center), 1,421 votes; and Peter Vilfan (ZaAB, Šiška 2), 652 votes.

Substitutions:

- Miro Cerar (SMC, Vič-Rudnik 3) forfeited his seat on 25 August 2014 upon being elected Prime Minister and was replaced by Dušan Verbič (SMC, Šiška 4) on 28 August 2014.
- Tanja Cink (SMC, Šiška 2) resigned on 26 April 2018 and was replaced by Dejan Balažič (SMC, Vič-Rudnik 4) on the same day.

===== 2011 =====
Results of the 2011 parliamentary election held on 4 December 2011:

Party		Votes per electoral district											Total votes	%	Seats		
Party		Ljubljana Center	Ljubljana Šiška 1	Ljubljana Šiška 2	Ljubljana Šiška 3	Ljubljana Šiška 4	Ljubljana Vič- Rudnik 1	Ljubljana Vič- Rudnik 2	Ljubljana Vič- Rudnik 3	Ljubljana Vič- Rudnik 4	Cerknica- Logatec	Vrhnika	Total votes	%	Con.	Nat.	Tot.
Zoran Janković's List – Positive Slovenia	LZJ-PS	6,807	5,200	6,241	5,682	5,582	5,872	5,967	5,482	4,790	4,895	5,066	61,584	40.81%	4	1	5
Slovenian Democratic Party	SDS	2,348	1,653	2,104	2,463	3,768	4,708	2,338	2,245	4,327	4,872	3,262	34,088	22.59%	2	1	3
Social Democrats	SD	1,756	1,150	1,514	1,240	1,298	1,204	962	1,265	1,257	1,381	1,323	14,350	9.51%	1	0	1
Gregor Virant's Civic List	LGV	923	690	876	955	1,346	1,266	902	931	1,335	1,618	1,196	12,038	7.98%	0	1	1
New Slovenia – Christian People's Party	NSi	712	323	431	573	954	860	485	446	1,134	1,419	794	8,131	5.39%	0	1	1
Slovenian People's Party	SLS	330	209	345	391	818	1,145	384	302	688	944	759	6,315	4.18%	0	0	0
Democratic Party of Pensioners of Slovenia	DeSUS	421	430	517	515	876	673	359	467	587	700	699	6,244	4.14%	0	0	0
Slovenian National Party	SNS	112	118	102	120	210	221	130	103	164	196	203	1,679	1.11%	0	0	0
Youth Party – European Greens	SMS-Z	213	120	152	146	154	138	116	112	183	163	134	1,631	1.08%	0	0	0
Liberal Democracy of Slovenia	LDS	155	150	104	99	118	120	87	85	119	194	99	1,330	0.88%	0	0	0
Zares		175	69	98	50	76	58	64	107	63	234	44	1,038	0.69%	0	0	0
Democratic Labour Party	DSD	59	52	58	79	94	64	45	62	67	72	61	713	0.47%	0	0	0
Forward Slovenia	NPS	48	58	40	53	74	79	33	55	64	100	78	682	0.45%	0	0	0
Movement for Slovenia	GZS	54	41	31	56	108	55	24	34	62	55	71	591	0.39%	0	0	0
Party of Equal Opportunities	SEM-Si	54	40	48	44	46	32	47	51	43	44	49	498	0.33%	0	0	0
Valid votes		14,167	10,303	12,661	12,466	15,522	16,495	11,943	11,747	14,883	16,887	13,838	150,912	100.00%	7	4	11
Rejected votes		176	131	154	140	252	257	131	136	182	254	198	2,011	1.32%			
Total polled		14,343	10,434	12,815	12,606	15,774	16,752	12,074	11,883	15,065	17,141	14,036	152,923	71.79%			
Registered electors		21,876	14,885	17,935	17,295	21,125	23,138	16,496	16,267	20,639	24,262	19,093	213,011				
Turnout		65.57%	70.10%	71.45%	72.89%	74.67%	72.40%	73.19%	73.05%	72.99%	70.65%	73.51%	71.79%				

The following candidates were elected:

- Constituency seats - Andreja Črnak Meglič (SD, Center), 1,756 votes; Zoran Janković (LZJ-PS, Vič-Rudnik 2), 5,967 votes; Janja Klasinc (LZJ-PS, Šiška 1), 5,200 votes; Maša Kociper (LZJ-PS, Vič-Rudnik 3), 5,482 votes; Dragutin Mate (SDS, Vič-Rudnik 4), 4,327 votes; Mitja Meršol (LZJ-PS, Šiška 2), 6,241 votes; and Andrej Šircelj (SDS, Cerknica-Logatec), 4,872 votes.
- National seats - Rihard Braniselj (LGV, Cerknica-Logatec), 1,618 votes; Iva Dimic (NSi, Cerknica-Logatec), 1,419 votes; Alenka Jeraj (SDS, Vič-Rudnik 1), 4,708 votes; and Tamara Vonta (LZJ-PS, Šiška 3), 5,682 votes.

Substitutions:

- Zoran Janković (LZJ-PS, Vič-Rudnik 2) forfeited his seat on 16 April 2012 upon being elected Mayor of Ljubljana and was replaced by Alenka Bikar (LZJ-PS, Vrhnika) on 19 April 2012.
- Andrej Šircelj (SDS, Cerknica-Logatec) forfeited his seat on 1 February 2013 upon being appointed to the government and was replaced by Saša Ciglar (SDS, Šiška 4) on 4 February 2013.
- Saša Ciglar (SDS, Šiška 4) forfeited his seat on 20 March 2013 when Andrej Šircelj (SDS, Cerknica-Logatec) lost his government position, regaining his seat.
- Tamara Vonta (LZJ-PS, Šiška 3) forfeited his seat on 2 April 2013 upon being appointed to the government and was replaced by Jožef Kunič (LZJ-PS, Vič-Rudnik 4) on 11 April 2013.

==== 2000s ====
===== 2008 =====
Results of the 2008 parliamentary election held on 21 September 2008:

Party		Votes per electoral district											Total votes	%	Seats		
Party		Ljubljana Center	Ljubljana Šiška 1	Ljubljana Šiška 2	Ljubljana Šiška 3	Ljubljana Šiška 4	Ljubljana Vič- Rudnik 1	Ljubljana Vič- Rudnik 2	Ljubljana Vič- Rudnik 3	Ljubljana Vič- Rudnik 4	Cerknica- Logatec	Vrhnika	Total votes	%	Con.	Nat.	Tot.
Social Democrats	SD	6,892	4,634	5,700	5,203	4,839	4,433	4,244	4,909	4,664	5,159	4,544	55,221	38.58%	4	1	5
Slovenian Democratic Party	SDS	2,899	1,938	2,536	3,012	4,235	4,937	2,986	2,628	4,652	5,082	3,957	38,862	27.15%	3	0	3
Zares		1,535	1,198	1,707	1,393	1,529	1,311	1,230	1,475	1,277	1,158	1,270	15,083	10.54%	1	1	2
Democratic Party of Pensioners of Slovenia	DeSUS	544	509	634	559	733	763	542	598	630	644	853	7,009	4.90%	0	0	0
Liberal Democracy of Slovenia	LDS	682	904	613	535	563	681	459	622	514	479	552	6,604	4.61%	0	1	1
New Slovenia – Christian People's Party	NSi	637	230	303	370	520	740	278	273	1,104	1,128	422	6,005	4.19%	0	0	0
Slovenian National Party	SNS	322	284	291	404	629	840	374	333	532	767	637	5,413	3.78%	0	0	0
Slovenian People's Party and Youth Party of Slovenia	SLS-SMS	170	77	82	96	600	788	110	122	196	664	338	3,243	2.27%	0	0	0
Lipa		178	242	199	241	272	211	191	191	242	206	179	2,352	1.64%	0	0	0
Christian Democratic Party	SKD	46	34	31	45	175	44	56	28	40	271	49	819	0.57%	0	0	0
List for Clear Drinking Water	LZČPV	89	38	58	69	78	76	47	69	93	84	73	774	0.54%	0	0	0
Greens of Slovenia	ZS	87	55	60	62	79	69	55	58	66	68	77	736	0.51%	0	0	0
Green Coalition: Green Party and Green Progress	ZL-ZP	32	21	26	35	40	17	35	54	27	20	19	326	0.23%	0	0	0
List for Justice and Development	LPR	16	20	16	19	28	30	19	16	29	27	57	277	0.19%	0	0	0
Party of Slovenian People	SSN	33	26	10	21	33	40	24	7	24	32	21	271	0.19%	0	0	0
Forward Slovenia	NPS	21	9	14	10	27	12	17	5	15	17	9	156	0.11%	0	0	0
Valid votes		14,183	10,219	12,280	12,074	14,380	14,992	10,667	11,388	14,105	15,806	13,057	143,151	100.00%	8	3	11
Rejected votes		156	104	112	109	226	245	106	118	185	275	196	1,832	1.26%			
Total polled		14,339	10,323	12,392	12,183	14,606	15,237	10,773	11,506	14,290	16,081	13,253	144,983	69.54%			
Registered electors		21,887	15,046	17,473	17,313	20,387	21,966	15,917	16,277	20,122	23,522	18,582	208,492				
Turnout		65.51%	68.61%	70.92%	70.37%	71.64%	69.37%	67.68%	70.69%	71.02%	68.37%	71.32%	69.54%				

The following candidates were elected:

- Constituency seats - Andreja Črnak Meglič (SD, Vič-Rudnik 3), 4,909 votes; France Cukjati (SDS, Vrhnika), 3,957 votes; Alenka Jeraj (SDS, Vič-Rudnik 1), 4,937 votes; Dušan Kumer (SD, Šiška 2), 5,700 votes; Miran Potrč (SD, Center), 6,892 votes; Anton Rop (SD, Šiška 1), 4,634 votes; Majda Širca (Zares, Šiška 2), 1,707 votes; and Peter Verlič (SDS, Cerknica-Logatec), 5,082 votes
- National seats - Pavel Gantar (Zares, Vič-Rudnik 3), 1,475 votes; Katarina Kresal (LDS, Šiška 1), 904 votes; and Franc Križanič (SD, Šiška 3), 5,203 votes.

Substitutions:

- Katarina Kresal (LDS, Šiška 1) forfeited his seat on 21 November 2008 upon being elected to the government and was replaced by Anton Anderlič (LDS, Šiška 2) on 16 December 2008.
- Franc Križanič (SD, Šiška 3) forfeited his seat on 21 November 2008 upon being elected to the government and was replaced by Andrej Magajna (SD, Vič-Rudnik 2) on 16 December 2008.
- Majda Širca (Zares, Šiška 2) forfeited his seat on 21 November 2008 upon being elected to the government and was replaced by Vito Rožej (Zares, Šiška 1) on 16 December 2008.
- Anton Rop (SD, Šiška 1) resigned on 7 September 2010 and was replaced by Andrej Magajna (SD, Vič-Rudnik 2) on 20 September 2010. Magajna's seat as replacement for Franc Križanič was taken by Janez Kikelj (SD, Vrhnika) on 20 September 2010.
- Vito Rožej (Zares, Šiška 1) forfeited his seat on 11 July 2011 when Majda Širca (Zares, Šiška 2) left her government position, regaining her seat.
- Anton Anderlič (LDS, Šiška 2) forfeited his seat on 2 September 2011 when Katarina Kresal (LDS, Šiška 1) left her government position, regaining her seat.
- Katarina Kresal (LDS, Šiška 1) resigned on 2 September 2011 and was replaced by Anton Anderlič (LDS, Šiška 2) on the same day.

===== 2004 =====
Results of the 2004 parliamentary election held on 3 October 2004:

Party		Votes per electoral district											Total votes	%	Seats		
Party		Ljubljana Center	Ljubljana Šiška 1	Ljubljana Šiška 2	Ljubljana Šiška 3	Ljubljana Šiška 4	Ljubljana Vič- Rudnik 1	Ljubljana Vič- Rudnik 2	Ljubljana Vič- Rudnik 3	Ljubljana Vič- Rudnik 4	Cerknica- Logatec	Vrhnika	Total votes	%	Con.	Nat.	Tot.
Slovenian Democratic Party	SDS	3,067	2,257	2,787	3,153	4,393	4,139	2,970	2,947	4,442	4,409	4,381	38,945	30.27%	3	1	4
Liberal Democracy of Slovenia	LDS	3,771	3,099	3,644	3,028	3,034	2,506	2,569	3,172	2,683	2,902	2,576	32,984	25.64%	3	0	3
United List of Social Democrats	ZLSD	2,274	1,442	1,898	1,511	1,074	882	999	1,338	1,099	1,284	994	14,795	11.50%	1	1	2
New Slovenia – Christian People's Party	NSi	1,178	661	863	979	1,481	1,830	827	813	1,888	2,001	1,003	13,524	10.51%	1	0	1
Slovenian National Party	SNS	589	482	532	584	728	633	464	564	566	614	550	6,306	4.90%	0	0	0
Slovenian People's Party	SLS	209	132	195	178	399	695	229	223	600	863	357	4,080	3.17%	0	1	1
Active Slovenia	AS	391	219	371	295	448	378	325	301	437	365	378	3,908	3.04%	0	0	0
Democratic Party of Pensioners of Slovenia	DeSUS	304	242	396	260	345	407	259	382	285	316	353	3,549	2.76%	0	0	0
Slovenia is Ours	SN	136	198	149	155	212	926	108	170	144	318	131	2,647	2.06%	0	0	0
Youth Party of Slovenia	SMS	159	254	184	192	180	166	134	140	157	296	174	2,036	1.58%	0	0	0
June List	JL	185	218	184	125	116	105	181	148	122	75	78	1,537	1.19%	0	0	0
Greens of Slovenia	ZS	190	60	94	75	109	52	76	105	77	88	54	980	0.76%	0	0	0
List for Enterprising Slovenia	PS	37	21	54	52	83	27	36	19	56	373	159	917	0.71%	0	0	0
Party of Ecological; Movements of Slovenia	SEG	78	55	67	61	52	52	46	80	71	45	105	712	0.55%	0	0	0
Women's Voice of Slovenia, Association for Primorska, Union of Independents of Slovenia and New Democracy of Slovenia	GZS- ZZP- ZNS- NDS	59	33	54	23	125	27	33	46	51	55	71	577	0.45%	0	0	0
Democratic Party of Slovenia	DS	38	44	30	24	27	31		24	24	28	11	281	0.22%	0	0	0
United for an Independent and Just Slovenia		30	15	15	21	42	15	19	13	29	43	15	257	0.20%	0	0	0
Forward Slovenia	NPS	17	18	15	14	26	19	19	19	18	28	27	220	0.17%	0	0	0
Social Liberal Party	LS	15	18	18	17	26	18	14	22	12	22	25	207	0.16%	0	0	0
Party of Slovenian People	SSN	18	20	10	16	13	38	21	12	13	26	9	196	0.15%	0	0	0
Valid votes		12,745	9,488	11,560	10,763	12,913	12,946	9,329	10,538	12,774	14,151	11,451	128,658	100.00%	8	3	11
Rejected votes		200	155	174	166	271	261	137	150	207	261	206	2,188	1.67%			
Total polled		12,945	9,643	11,734	10,929	13,184	13,207	9,466	10,688	12,981	14,412	11,657	130,846	65.42%			
Registered electors		20,891	15,082	17,606	16,904	19,388	20,163	15,261	16,196	19,241	21,875	17,396	200,003				
Turnout		61.96%	63.94%	66.65%	64.65%	68.00%	65.50%	62.03%	65.99%	67.47%	65.88%	67.01%	65.42%				

The following candidates were elected:

- Constituency seats - Anton Anderlič (LDS, Šiška 2), 3,644 votes; Andrej Bručan (SDS, Vič-Rudnik 4), 4,442 votes; France Cukjati (SDS, Vrhnika), 4,381 votes; Pavel Gantar (LDS, Vič-Rudnik 3), 3,172 votes; Mojca Kucler Dolinar (NSi, Vič-Rudnik 4), 1,888 votes; Mitja Ljubeljšek (SDS, Šiška 4), 4,393 votes; Miran Potrč (ZLSD, Center), 2,274 votes; and Majda Širca (LDS, Šiška 1), 3,099 votes.
- National seats - Stanislav Brenčič (SLS, Cerknica-Logatec), 863 votes; Alenka Jeraj (SDS, Vič-Rudnik 1), 4,139 votes; and Dušan Kumer (ZLSD, Šiška 2), 1,898 votes.

Substitutions:

- Andrej Bručan (SDS, Vič-Rudnik 4) forfeited his seat on 3 December 2004 upon being elected to the government and was replaced by Polonca Dobrajc (SDS, Vič-Rudnik 2) on 16 December 2004.
- Polonca Dobrajc (SDS, Vič-Rudnik 2) forfeited his seat on 11 September 2007 when Andrej Bručan (SDS, Vič-Rudnik 4) left his government position, regaining his seat.
- Mojca Kucler Dolinar (NSi, Vič-Rudnik 4) forfeited her seat on 1 October 2007 upon being elected to the government and was replaced by Majda Zupan (NSi, Cerknica-Logatec) on 22 October 2007.

===== 2000 =====
Results of the 2000 parliamentary election held on 15 October 2000:

Party		Votes per electoral district											Total votes	%	Seats		
Party		Ljubljana Center	Ljubljana Šiška 1	Ljubljana Šiška 2	Ljubljana Šiška 3	Ljubljana Šiška 4	Ljubljana Vič- Rudnik 1	Ljubljana Vič- Rudnik 2	Ljubljana Vič- Rudnik 3	Ljubljana Vič- Rudnik 4	Cerknica- Logatec	Vrhnika	Total votes	%	Con.	Nat.	Tot.
Liberal Democracy of Slovenia	LDS	6,799	5,040	5,507	5,249	4,439	4,318	4,161	5,991	4,510	4,604	4,341	54,959	38.83%	4	0	4
Social Democratic Party of Slovenia	SDSS	1,875	1,466	1,805	1,973	2,842	3,002	2,025	1,809	2,863	2,793	2,708	25,161	17.78%	2	0	2
United List of Social Democrats	ZLSD	2,575	1,758	2,201	1,546	1,481	1,087	1,189	1,408	1,468	1,999	1,516	18,228	12.88%	1	1	2
New Slovenia – Christian People's Party	NSi	1,405	809	867	1,156	1,642	1,677	815	970	1,655	2,026	1,305	14,327	10.12%	1	0	1
Slovenian People's Party and Slovene Christian Democrats	SLS-SKD	377	311	372	411	713	1,211	423	311	1,006	1,697	672	7,504	5.30%	0	1	1
Youth Party of Slovenia	SMS	487	481	734	652	819	680	492	505	663	850	647	7,010	4.95%	0	1	1
Slovenian National Party	SNS	599	483	486	558	582	458	362	493	452	433	406	5,312	3.75%	0	0	0
Democratic Party of Pensioners of Slovenia	DeSUS	304	431	476	433	496	483	361	379	470	395	329	4,557	3.22%	0	0	0
Greens of Slovenia	ZS	140	129	150	94	199	100	78	79	108	74	83	1,234	0.87%	0	0	0
Party of Democratic Action of Slovenia	SDAS	66	81	84	78	63	0	126	75	77	38	64	752	0.53%	0	0	0
Democratic Party of Slovenia	DS	75	52	60	60	90	84	49	62	86	67	46	731	0.52%	0	0	0
New Party	NS	45	63	70	74	77	71	42	69	56	68	31	666	0.47%	0	0	0
Movement for Human Rights	GČP	57	76	68	55	66	67	56	51	39	67	48	650	0.46%	0	0	0
Forward Slovenia	NPS	23	29	38	35	42	66	43	13	51	58	42	440	0.31%	0	0	0
Valid votes		14,827	11,209	12,918	12,374	13,551	13,304	10,222	12,215	13,504	15,169	12,238	141,531	100.00%	8	3	11
Rejected votes		280	251	302	375	470	400	285	200	407	415	369	3,754	2.58%			
Total polled		15,107	11,460	13,220	12,749	14,021	13,704	10,507	12,415	13,911	15,584	12,607	145,285	74.92%			
Registered electors		21,024	15,363	17,422	16,883	18,244	18,239	14,462	16,440	18,319	21,228	16,309	193,933				
Turnout		71.86%	74.59%	75.88%	75.51%	76.85%	75.14%	72.65%	75.52%	75.94%	73.41%	77.30%	74.92%				

The following candidates were elected:

- Constituency seats - Anton Anderlič (LDS); Janez Cimperman (SDSS); France Cukjati (SDSS); Janez Drnovšek (LDS); Janez Kopač (LDS); Miran Potrč (ZLSD); Majda Širca (LDS); and Majda Zupan (NSi).
- National seats - Stanislav Brenčič (SLS-SKD); Silva Črnugelj (ZLSD); and Peter Levič (SMS).

Substitutions:

- Janez Drnovšek (LDS) forfeited his seat on 16 November 2000 upon being elected Prime Minister and was replaced by Borut Šuklje (LDS) on 30 November 2000.
- Janez Kopač (LDS) forfeited his seat on 30 November 2000 upon being elected to the government and was replaced by Richard Beuermann (LDS) on 19 December 2000.
- Borut Šuklje (LDS) forfeited his seat on 2 May 2001 upon being appointed ambassador to Yugoslavia. Šuklje's seat as replacement for Janez Drnovšek was taken by Jaša Zlobec (LDS) on 22 May 2001.
- Jaša Zlobec (LDS) forfeited his seat on 19 December 2002 after Janez Drnovšek (LDS) resigned as Prime Minister on 4 December 2002, regaining his seat.
- Janez Drnovšek (LDS) resigned on 19 December 2002 and was replaced by Richard Beuermann (LDS) on 27 December 2002. Beuermann's seat as replacement for Janez Kopač was taken by Jaša Zlobec (LDS) on 27 December 2002.

==== 1990s ====
===== 1996 =====
Results of the 1996 parliamentary election held on 10 November 1996:

Party		Votes per electoral district											Total votes	%	Seats		
Party		Ljubljana Center	Ljubljana Šiška 1	Ljubljana Šiška 2	Ljubljana Šiška 3	Ljubljana Šiška 4	Ljubljana Vič- Rudnik 1	Ljubljana Vič- Rudnik 2	Ljubljana Vič- Rudnik 3	Ljubljana Vič- Rudnik 4	Cerknica- Logatec	Vrhnika	Total votes	%	Con.	Nat.	Tot.
Liberal Democracy of Slovenia	LDS	4,379	3,695	4,042	3,863	2,902	2,145	2,972	3,961	2,691	3,366	3,088	37,104	26.37%	2	1	3
Slovenian People's Party	SLS	1,424	1,225	1,473	1,585	2,887	3,882	1,468	1,397	3,854	3,780	2,504	25,479	18.11%	1	1	2
Social Democratic Party of Slovenia	SDSS	2,347	1,788	1,975	2,313	2,265	2,176	1,892	2,104	2,110	2,334	2,001	23,305	16.57%	1	1	2
United List of Social Democrats	ZLSD	2,697	2,261	2,022	1,327	859	1,092	995	1,518	1,023	1,129	712	15,635	11.11%	1	0	1
Slovene Christian Democrats	SKD	1,234	715	748	1,005	1,356	1,071	878	763	1,312	1,666	1,303	12,051	8.57%	0	1	1
Democratic Party of Slovenia	DS	1,070	608	769	539	435	328	440	624	499	542	416	6,270	4.46%	0	0	0
Slovenian National Party	SNS	858	477	648	524	721	384	389	552	525	434	435	5,947	4.23%	0	1	1
Democratic Party of Pensioners of Slovenia	DeSUS	279	305	360	297	184	307	266	426	370	283	165	3,242	2.30%	0	0	0
Greens of Slovenia	ZS	246	202	209	203	211	130	187	177	153	146	187	2,051	1.46%	0	0	0
Slovenian Forum	SF	85	56	59	205	394	214	40	109	79	79	76	1,396	0.99%	0	0	0
Slovenian Craftsmen and Entrepreneurial; Party and Centrum Party	SOPS	100	80	115	108	112	111	88	127	129	151	118	1,239	0.88%	0	0	0
Communist Party of Slovenia	KPS	164	105	137	140	88	74	112	105	86	117	82	1,210	0.86%	0	0	0
Liberal Party	LS	105	75	75	84	136	84	98	85	98	92	90	1,022	0.73%	0	0	0
Patriotic United Retirement Party and League for Slovenia	DEUS-LZS	101	102	141	67	82	0	75	97	0	0	48	713	0.51%	0	0	0
Christian Social Union	KSU	90	55	72	90	48	55	49	36	51	70	36	652	0.46%	0	0	0
Franc Klančar (Independent)	Ind	81	61	61	50	53	42	41	46	70	48	60	613	0.44%	0	0	0
Green Alternative of Slovenia	ZA	97	41	56	76	48	16	32	52	34	54	64	570	0.41%	0	0	0
Matija Potokar (Independent)	Ind	14	15	15	16	14	17	14	6	10	322	15	458	0.33%	0	0	0
National Labour Party	NSD	37	33	36	23	93	44	41	37	26	58	25	453	0.32%	0	0	0
Forward Slovenia	NPS	64	31	45	28	20	15	33	27	20	94	22	399	0.28%	0	0	0
Party for the Equality of Regions	SED	37	21	25	25	25	35	69	40	23	33	50	383	0.27%	0	0	0
Slovenian National Right	SND	31	29	29	28	23	20	24	16	21	25	29	275	0.20%	0	0	0
Republican Association of Slovenia	RZS	20	18	20	16	40	16	10	18	16	24	19	217	0.15%	0	0	0
Valid votes		15,560	11,998	13,132	12,612	12,996	12,258	10,213	12,323	13,200	14,847	11,545	140,684	100.00%	5	5	10
Rejected votes													6,872	4.66%			
Total polled													147,556	78.45%			
Registered electors													188,081				
Turnout													78.45%				

The following candidates were elected:

- Constituency seats - Anton Anderlič (LDS); Igor Bavčar (LDS); Majda Kregelj Zbačnik (SDSS); Marjan Podobnik (SLS); and Ciril Ribičič (ZLSD).
- National seats - Stanislav Brenčič (SLS); Polonca Dobrajc (SNS); Helena Hren Vencelj (SKD); Janez Kopač (LDS); and Jože Zagožen (SDSS).

Substitutions:

- Marjan Podobnik (SLS) forfeited his seat on 27 February 1997 upon being elected to the government and was replaced by Leon Gostiša (SLS) on 25 March 1997.
- Igor Bavčar (LDS) forfeited his seat on 29 October 1997 upon being elected to the government and was replaced by Richard Beuermann (LDS) on 25 November 1997.
- Leon Gostiša (SLS) forfeited his seat on 7 June 2000 when Marjan Podobnik (SLS) lost his government position, regaining his seat.
- Jože Zagožen (SDSS) forfeited his seat on 7 June 2000 upon being elected to the government and was replaced by Janez Cimperman (SDSS) on 20 June 2000.
- Marjan Podobnik resigned on 13 June 2000 and was replaced by Leon Gostiša (SLS) on 27 June 2000.

===== 1992 =====
Results of the 1992 parliamentary election held on 6 December 1992:

Party		Votes	%	Seats		
Party		Votes	%	Con.	Nat.	Tot.
Liberal Democracy of Slovenia	LDS	33,954	22.46%	2	0	2
Slovenian National Party	SNS	22,203	14.69%	1	0	1
Slovene Christian Democrats	SKD	21,959	14.52%	1	1	2
United List	ZL	21,041	13.92%	1	1	2
Democratic Party of Slovenia	DS	11,998	7.94%	0	1	1
Slovenian People's Party	SLS	10,509	6.95%	0	0	0
Greens of Slovenia	ZS	5,687	3.76%	0	1	1
Social Democratic Party of Slovenia	SDSS	3,773	2.50%	0	0	0
Socialist Party of Slovenia	SSS	3,311	2.19%	0	0	0
National Democratic Party and Slovenian Party	ND-SGS	3,032	2.01%	0	0	0
Liberal Democratic Party of Slovenia	LDSS	2,703	1.79%	0	0	0
Independent Party	SN	2,077	1.37%	0	0	0
Liberal Party	LS	1,797	1.19%	0	0	0
Christian Socialists, DS Forward and Free Party	KS-DS	1,579	1.04%	0	0	0
Slovenian Craftsmen and Entrepreneurial; Party and Centrum Party	SOPS	1,563	1.03%	0	0	0
DEMOS	DEMOS	758	0.50%	0	0	0
Slovenian Ecological Movement	SEG	729	0.48%	0	0	0
“SMER" Association of Slovenia	SMER	713	0.47%	0	0	0
Movement for General Democracy	GOD	628	0.42%	0	0	0
Independent	Ind	550	0.36%	0	0	0
Republican Association of Slovenia	RZS	339	0.22%	0	0	0
Primorska Association	ZZP	281	0.19%	0	0	0
Valid votes		151,184	100.00%	5	4	9
Rejected votes		9,308	5.80%			
Total polled		160,492	88.20%			
Registered electors		181,955				

The following candidates were elected:

- Constituency seats - Zmago Jelinčič (SNS); Janez Kopač (LDS); Vika Potočnik (LDS); Ciril Ribičič (ZL); and Nada Skuk (SKD).
- National seats - Rado Bohinc (ZL); Dimitrij Rupel (DS); Miroslav Mozetič (SKD); and Peter Tancig (ZS).

Substitutions:

- Rado Bohinc (ZL) forfeited his seat on 25 January 1993 upon being elected to the government and was replaced by Janez Kocijančič (ZL) on 23 February 1993.
- Dimitrij Rupel (DS) resigned on 2 June 1995 and was replaced by Ljerka Bizilj (DS) on 22 June 1995.
