= Rašica =

Rašica may refer to:

In Serbia:

- Rašica, Serbia, a village in the Municipality of Blace

In Slovenia:

- Rašica, Ljubljana, a settlement in the City Municipality of Ljubljana
- Rašica, Velike Lašče, a settlement in the Municipality of Velike Lašče
