= Rašica (Blace) =

Rašica Рашица (Serbian) Rashica
- Village
- Location within Serbia
- Coordinates: 43°16′47″N 21°11′50″E
- Country: Serbia
- District: Toplica District
- Municipality: Blace

Population (2002)
  - Total: 183
- Time zone: UTC+1 (CET)
  - Summer (DST): UTC+2 (CEST)

Rašica (Serbian Cyrillic: Рашица) is a village in the municipality of Blace, Serbia. According to the 2002 census, the village has a population of 183 people.

== Etymology ==
The toponym Rašica is found in two other places, both located in Slovenia. Rašica, Ljubljana, a settlement in the City Municipality of Ljubljana, and Rašica, Velike Lašče, a settlement in the Municipality of Velike Lašče. This suggests the name of Rašica village in Serbia is likely of Slavic origin; however, the two other locations with the same name have different etymological origins. This also makes it likely for the village in Serbia to have a different etymological origin, despite both countries speaking Slavic.

In Ljubljana, Rašica was attested in written sources in 1260 as Wrenschitz. The Slovenian name of the village was originally *Vranščica, derived from the personal name *Vran via the adjective *vranski, referring to an early inhabitant of the area. In the past, the village was known as Uranschitz in German.

While in Velike Lašče, Rašica was attested in historical sources in 1230 as Reschwiz (and as Reschicz in 1260 and Rasczicz in 1436). The name was originally a hydronym, referring to Rašica Creek south of the village. The name is derived from the common noun raka meaning wooden cladding preventing water erosion of a bank' or 'cladded chute carrying water to a mill'. Both the Slovene and German names are ultimately derived from Latin arca, 'box'.

Both etymologies are unrelated to each other, so it is likely that the same hypothesis applies in Serbia too. However, the Slovenian language and the Serbian language are quite similar to each other, both being southern Slavic languages. Both ethnic groups migrated to the Balkans in the same time period, and both people are quite close genetically and ethnically, and historically too, in Yugoslavia, for example, where they were united in one country. This makes it likely that the word Rašica is of Slavic origin, but it is not known what it means.

== History ==
Toponyms such as Arbanaška and Đjake show a historic Albanian presence in the Toplica and Southern Morava regions. The Toplica region had an Albanian majority, which included Rašica. Rašica would’ve been spelled Rashica in the Albanian language.

Rašica had 30 houses inhabited by Albanians before the Expulsion of the Albanians took place in 1877–1878. All Albanians left the Blace region by force of the Serbian army and fled to modern-day Kosovo, which was back then the Vilayet of Kosovo of the Ottoman Empire. These Albanians became known as Muxhahirs. Demographically, these Albanians were of the Gheg dialect and were Muslims.

Some families from Rashica kept their surname as the village they were from; hence, today in Kosovo, we find the Rashica families.
