= Srnjak =

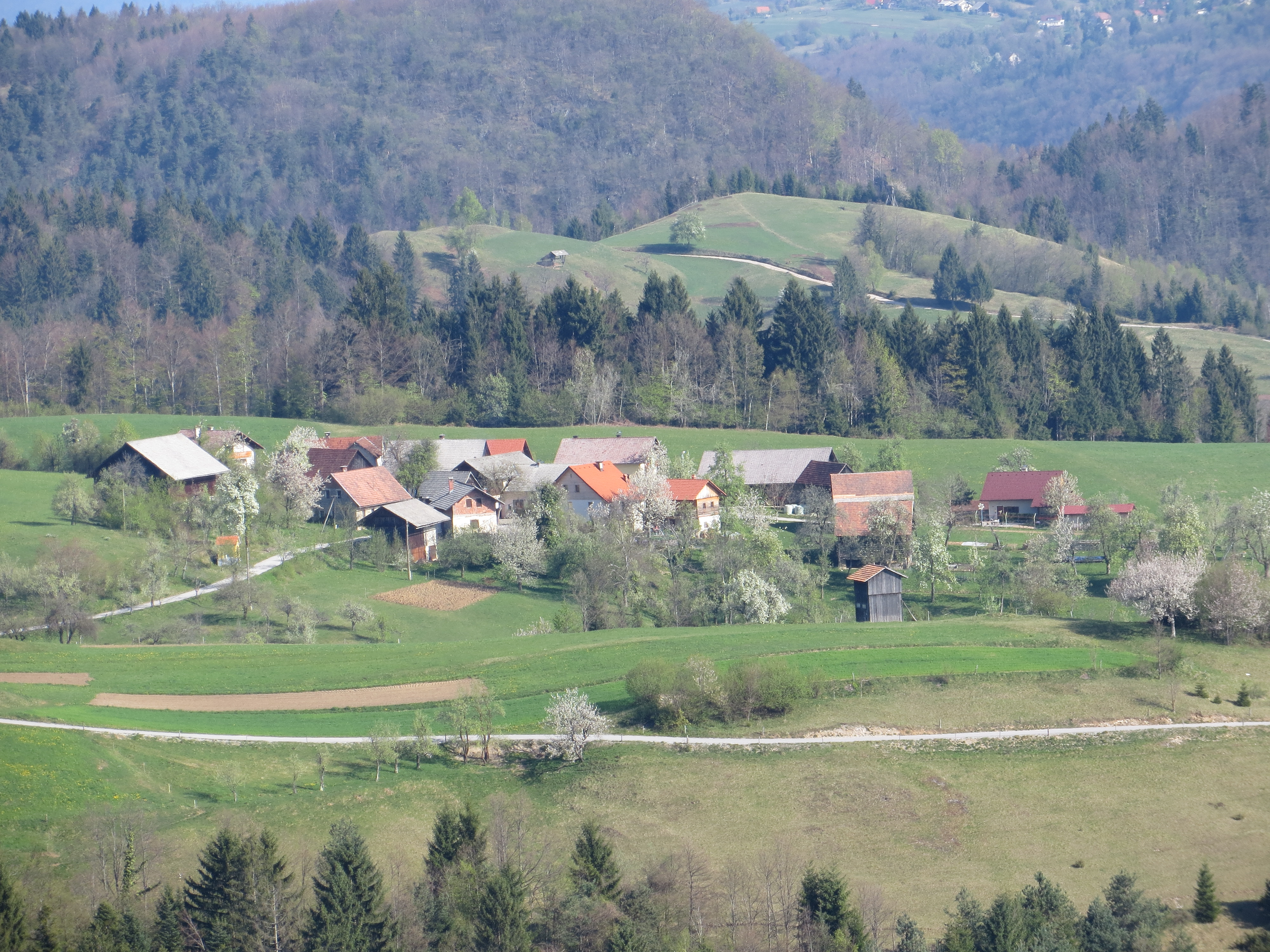

- Location in Slovenia
- Coordinates: 45°51′48.59″N 14°35′22.36″E
- Country: Slovenia
- Traditional region: Lower Carniola
- Statistical region: Central Slovenia
- Municipality: Velike Lašče

Area
  - Total: 1.15 km^{2} (0.44 sq mi)
- Elevation: 573.7 m (1,882 ft)

Population (2002)
  - Total: 8
- Postal code: 1314

Srnjak (pronounced [səɾˈnjaːk]) is a small settlement in the hills southwest of Turjak and northwest of Rašica in the Municipality of Velike Lašče in central Slovenia. The municipality is part of the traditional region of Lower Carniola and is now included in the Central Slovenia Statistical Region.
