= Dolščaki =

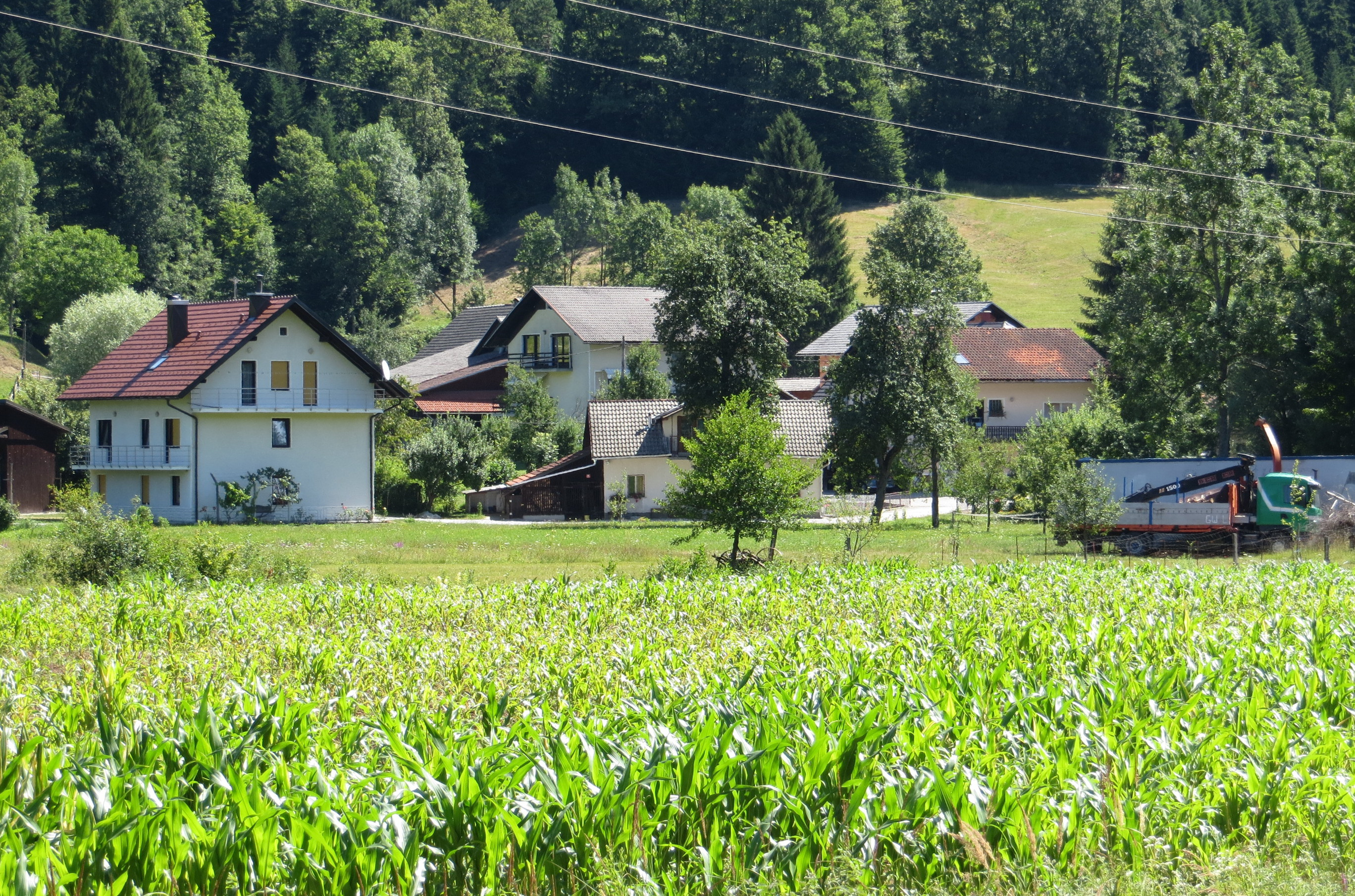

- Location in Slovenia
- Coordinates: 45°50′47.52″N 14°34′43.36″E
- Country: Slovenia
- Traditional region: Lower Carniola
- Statistical region: Central Slovenia
- Municipality: Velike Lašče

Area
  - Total: 1.09 km^{2} (0.42 sq mi)
- Elevation: 502.1 m (1,647 ft)

Population (2002)
  - Total: 65
- Postal code: 1314

Dolščaki (pronounced [dɔu̯ˈʃtʃaːki]) is a settlement in the Municipality of Velike Lašče in Slovenia. Its territory includes the hamlet of Kurja Vas (Slovene: Kurja vas) along the main road from Rašica to Rob. The area is part of the traditional region of Lower Carniola and is now included in the Central Slovenia Statistical Region.
