= Tamara Vonta =

Slovenian politician (born 1970)

Member of the National Assembly
- Incumbent
- Assumed office 13 May 2022
- Constituency: Novo Mesto – Krško
- In office 21 December 2011 – 1 April 2013
- Constituency: Ljubljana Center – Šiška III

Personal details
- Born: 13 December 1970 (age 55)
- Party: Freedom Movement

Tamara Vonta (born 13 December 1970) is a Slovenian politician. She has been a member of the National Assembly since 2022, having previously served from 2011 to 2013. Since 2023, she has served as a vice president of the Parliamentary Assembly of the Council of Europe.
