= Rashica =

Rashica is an Albanian Kosovar surname.

== History ==
The surname comes from the Village of Rašica located in southern Serbia, in the Toplica district, Blace. The village had 30 houses inhabited by Albanian families before the Expulsion of the Albanians took place in 1877–1878. The Albanians who left this region are known as Muhaxhirs. The Albanians from this Village kept their surname the same as the village to remember their roots this is where the modern Rashica surname comes from.

== Notable people with the surname ==
- Andin Rashica (born 1990), Kosovan basketball coach
- Ermir Rashica (born 2004), Albanian footballer
- Milot Rashica (born 1996), Kosovan footballer
- Valdrin Rashica (born 1994), Kosovan footballer
