= Alenka Jeraj =

Slovenian politician (born 1973)

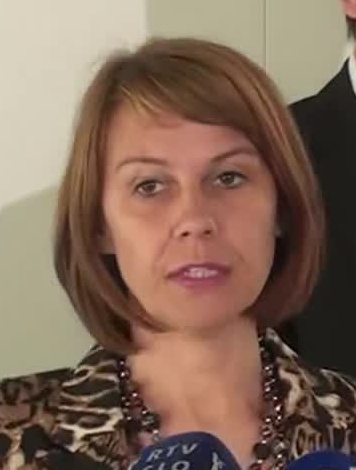
- Jeraj in 2012

Member of the National Assembly
- Incumbent
- Assumed office 3 June 2018
- Constituency: Vič-Rudnik I
- In office 3 October 2004 – 13 July 2014
- Constituency: Vič-Rudnik I

Personal details
- Born: 23 February 1973 (age 53)
- Party: Slovenian Democratic Party (since 1996)

Alenka Jeraj (born 23 February 1973) is a Slovenian politician. She has been a member of the National Assembly since 2018, having previously served from 2004 to 2014. She has served as president of the women's wing of the Slovenian Democratic Party since 2021, having previously served from 2009 to 2017.
