= Zgornje Gameljne =

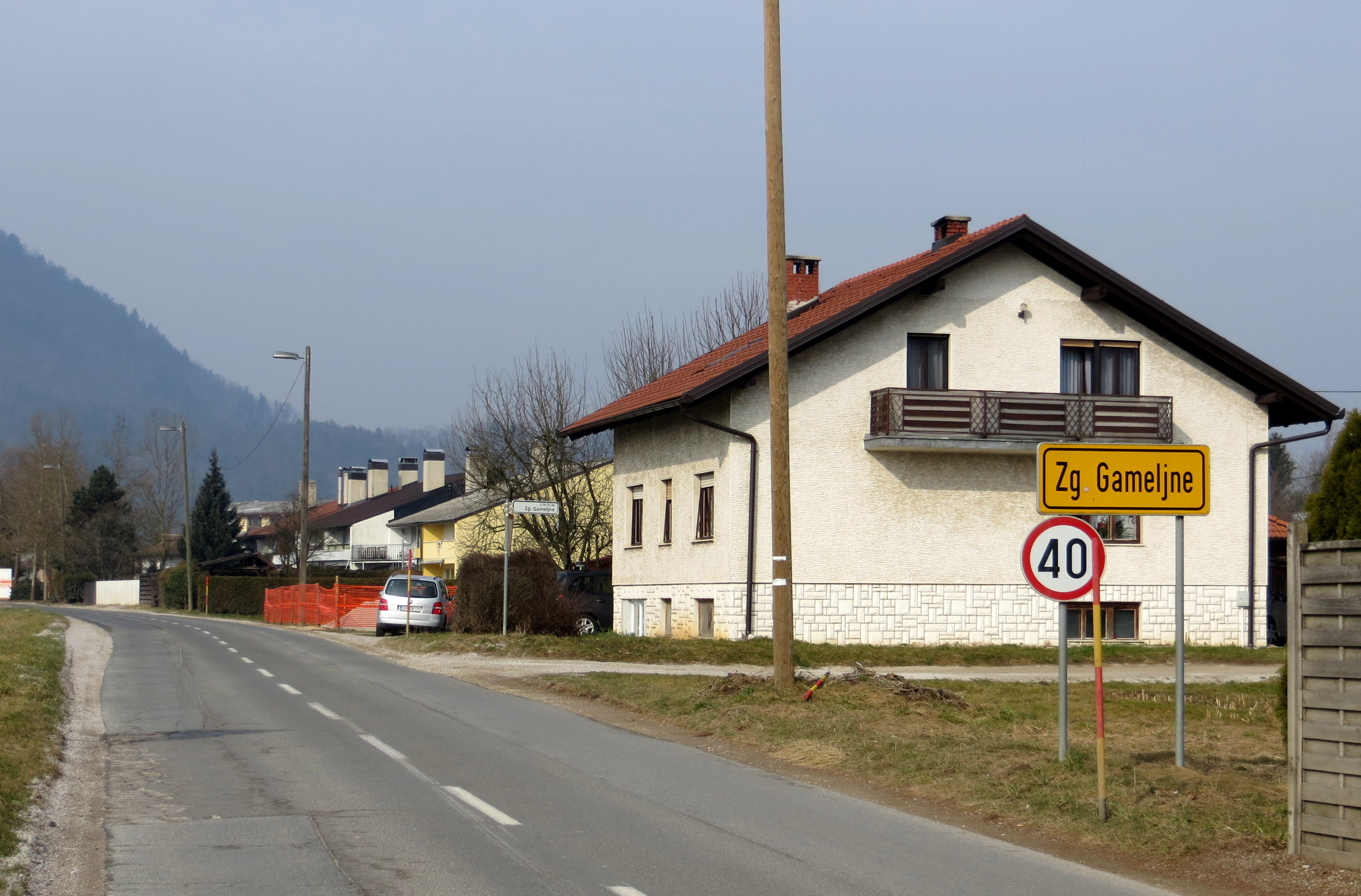

- Location in Slovenia
- Coordinates: 46°7′41.05″N 14°29′20.3″E
- Country: Slovenia
- Traditional region: Upper Carniola
- Statistical region: Central Slovenia
- Municipality: Ljubljana

Area
  - Total: 2.94 km^{2} (1.14 sq mi)
- Elevation: 313.5 m (1,029 ft)

Population (2002)
  - Total: 501
- Postal code: 1211

Zgornje Gameljne (pronounced [ˈzɡoːɾnjɛ ˈɡaːməlnɛ]; German: Obergamling) is a settlement north of the capital Ljubljana in central Slovenia. It belongs to the City Municipality of Ljubljana. It is part of the traditional region of Upper Carniola and is now included with the rest of the municipality in the Central Slovenia Statistical Region.

== Name ==
The name Zgornje Gameljne means 'upper Gameljne', distinguishing the settlement from Srednje Gameljne 'middle Gameljne' and Spodnje Gameljne 'lower Gameljne'. The settlement was attested in written sources in 1260 as Gemlein (and as Gemleyn in 1295, Gaͤmelein in 1338, and Obergamling in 1498). The name developed via dialect pronunciation from the older form *Gamljine—also a plural, probably reflecting the fact that there have been three such settlements since at least the mid-15th century. The name is probably based on a form such as *Gamľa (vьsь) 'Gamъ's (village)', referring to some early inhabitant of the place.

== Cultural Heritage ==
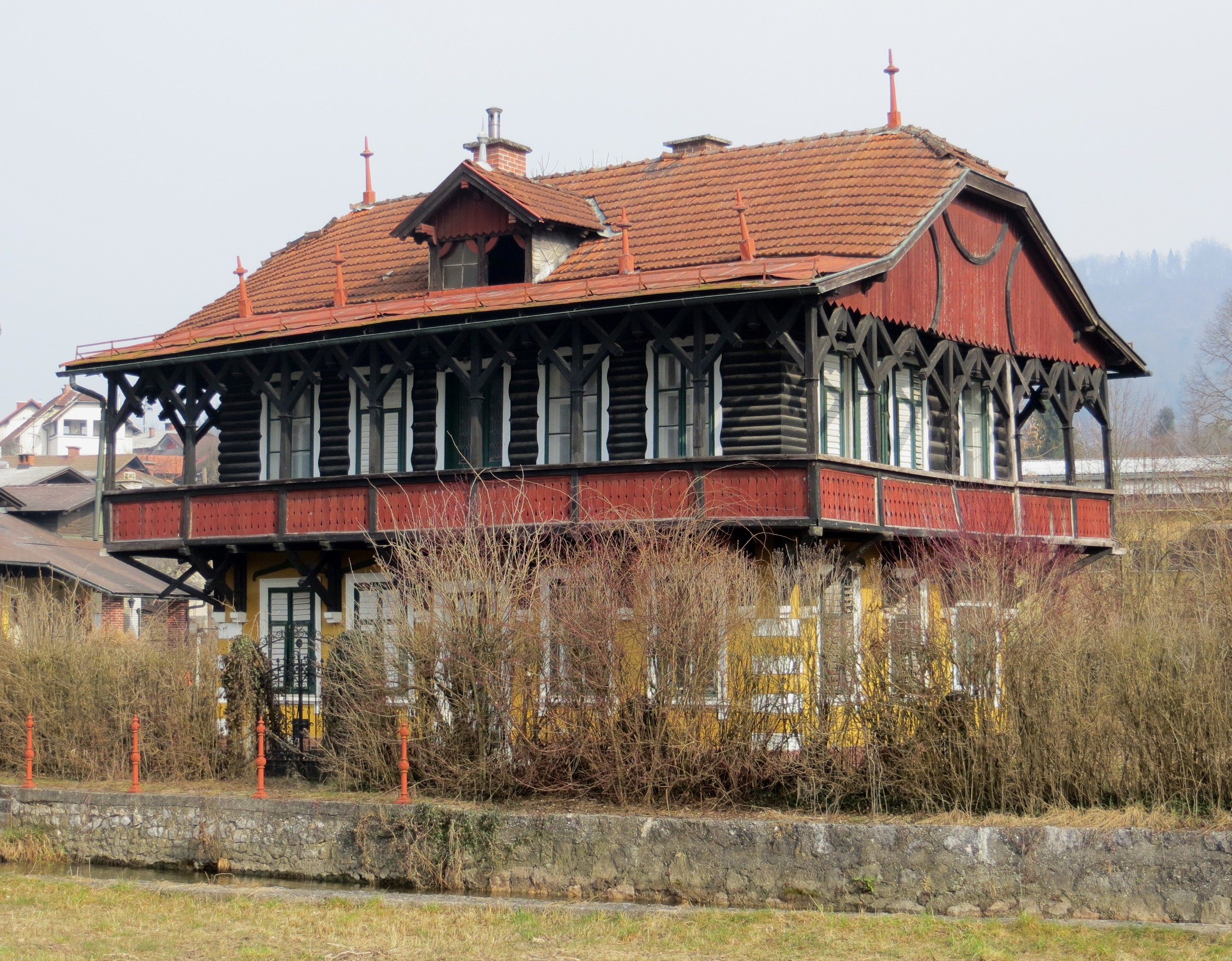
Russian dacha

Several structures or sites in Zgornje Gameljne are registered as cultural heritage.

- The configuration of the terrain at the Prod Archaeological Site indicates that a prehistoric settlement was located there.
- The Na Ježi Roman Cemetery has been partially excavated. It is a flat burial ground with cremation and inhumation burials. The National Museum of Slovenia has a bronze ring and a bowl from the site.
- The village core of Zgornje Gameljne, which lies along Gameljščica Creek at the foot of Rašica Hill (Slovene: Rašiški hrib), has been designated as cultural heritage. It partially preserves the original layout of a clustered village.
- The house at Zgornje Gameljne no. 17 stands along the main road in the eastern part of the village. It is a single-story masonry structure; the door casing in the central bay bears the year 1892, and above this is a large dormer with two windows. The house has a symmetrical gable roof covered with tiles.
- The house at Zgornje Gameljne no. 39 stands in the middle of the village, between the street and Gameljščica Creek. It is a two-story masonry house with an almost square layout and a pyramid hip roof. The rectangular door casing bears the year 1885 and the facade is decorated in Secession style.
- The barn and granary at Zgornje Gameljne no. 38 consists of a two-story masonry structure with a barn in the ground floor and a granary above. There is a masonry balcony with five arches in an arcade supported by arches and columns at the ground-floor level. The building dates from the mid-19th century and has a symmetrical gable roof. It stands alongside the road in the northern part of the village next to a renovated house.
- The Russian dacha at Zgornje Gameljne no. 18 is unique in Slovenia. It was built by Russian immigrants around 1890. The ground floor is masonry and the upper story is made of wood and completely encircled by a balcony. It is decorated with wooden details and stained glass. It stands in the eastern part of the village along Gameljščica Creek.
- A memorial plaque commemorating the August 1939 conference of the Ljubljana regional committee of the Communist Party of Slovenia was mounted on a house in the village around 1960. The plaque was removed in 1992.

== Notable people ==
Notable people who were born or lived in Zgornje Gameljne include:

- Matevž Gradišek (1776–1837), homeopath and founder of the epidemic hospital at Žabjek in Ljubljana
- Stane Kosec (1913–1941), Partisan and People's Hero of Yugoslavia
