= Katarina Kresal =

Slovenian politician (born 1973)

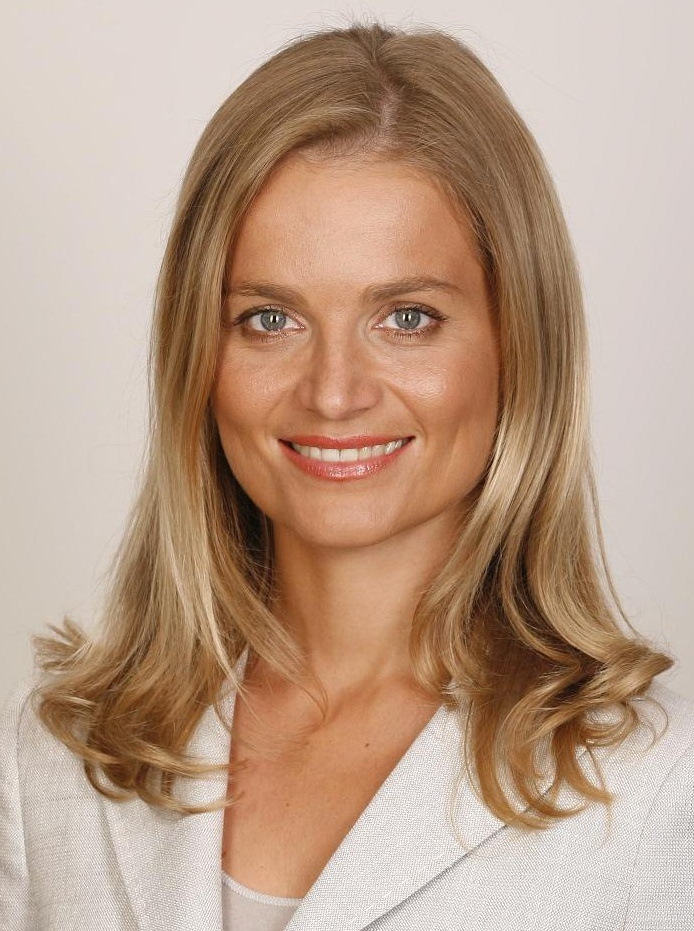
Katarina Kresal

Katarina Kresal (born 28 January 1973) is a Slovenian politician. She was the Minister of the Interior in the government of Borut Pahor from 24 November 2008 till 19 August 2011.

== Biography ==
Born in Ljubljana, Kresal studied law at the University of Ljubljana and in 1996 graduated with honours. Firstly, she was employed as a legal trainee at the Higher Court in Ljubljana, then as a law clerk in a Commercial Disputes department at District Court in Ljubljana. Later she worked as an independent advisor for legal affairs at Kapitalska družba d.d. and afterwards as a Director of the Legal Department in Western Wireless International, Slovenian company based in Ljubljana owned by Americans. Since 2003 she worked as an attorney in law firm Miro Senica & attorneys. In 2005 she became Deputy Head of Office and Head of Commercial and International Law Department.

She entered politics in 2007, when she was elected for the president of the Liberal Democracy of Slovenia (LDS). In the 2008 Slovenian parliamentary election, she was elected to the National Assembly. On 24 November of the same year, she became Minister of Interior of the centre-left government of Borut Pahor with a handover from Dragutin Mate.

On 12 January 2010, she was proclaimed the Slovenian Woman of the Year for 2009. The award is conferred each year by readers of Jana, the oldest Slovenian women's magazine.

On 10 August 2011, she stepped down as a Minister of Interior due to the opinion given by the Commission for the Prevention of Corruption of the Republic of Slovenia over a lease of a building to house the Slovenian National Bureau of Investigation. In their opinion they stated that there could be some irregularities in the lease of the building. She resigned due to her own principle values although she did not agree with the opinion given by Commission for the Prevention of Corruption. Her term ended on 19 August 2011, when the National Assembly took formal note of her resignation. She did not decide to retake the post of a deputy. She stated that she would use all legally possible channels to prove that the lease was untainted.

On 15 December 2011, Kresal irrevocably resigned as the president of LDS after the party failed to secure itself the entry into the National Assembly at the 2011 Slovenian parliamentary election.

In 2012 she founded European Centre of Dispute Resolution (ECDR). ECDR offers services in various fields, with emphasis on commercial, financial, business, consumer, civil, family and employment issues. ECDR operates internationally.

Political offices
Preceded by Dragutin Mate	Minister of the Interior; 24 November 2008–19 August 2011	Succeeded by Aleš Zalar
Party political offices
Preceded by Jelko Kacin	President of the LDS; 30 June 2007–15 December 2011	Succeeded by Iztok Podbregar
