= Spodnje Gameljne =

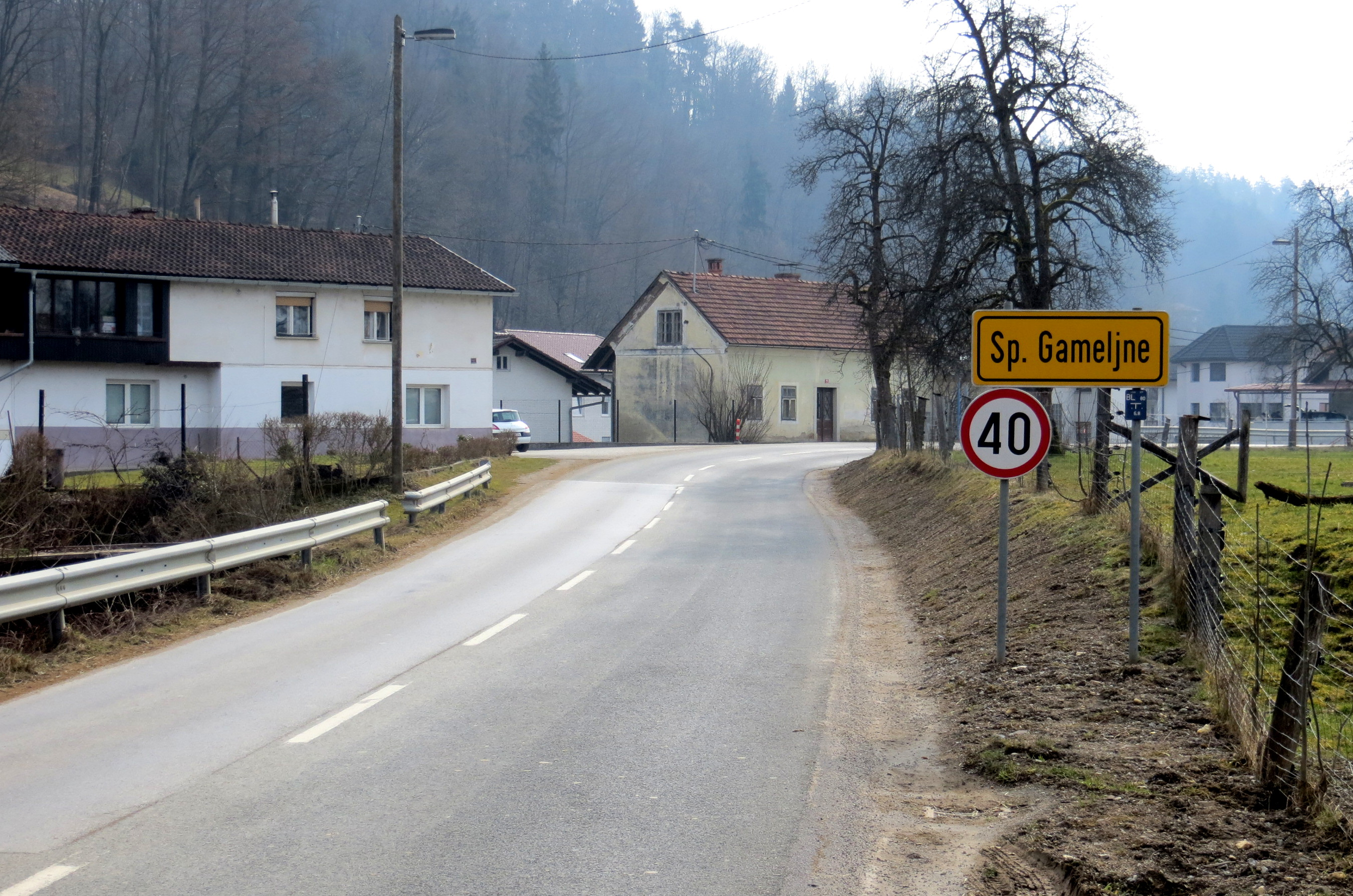

- Location in Slovenia
- Coordinates: 46°7′22.49″N 14°30′11.71″E
- Country: Slovenia
- Traditional region: Upper Carniola
- Statistical region: Central Slovenia
- Municipality: Ljubljana

Area
  - Total: 2.31 km^{2} (0.89 sq mi)
- Elevation: 306.7 m (1,006 ft)

Population (2002)
  - Total: 572
- Postal code: 1211

Spodnje Gameljne (pronounced [ˈspoːdnjɛ ˈɡaːməlnɛ]; German: Untergamling) is a village on the right bank of the Sava River north of the capital Ljubljana in central Slovenia. It belongs to the City Municipality of Ljubljana. It is part of the traditional region of Upper Carniola and is now included with the rest of the municipality in the Central Slovenia Statistical Region.

== Geography ==
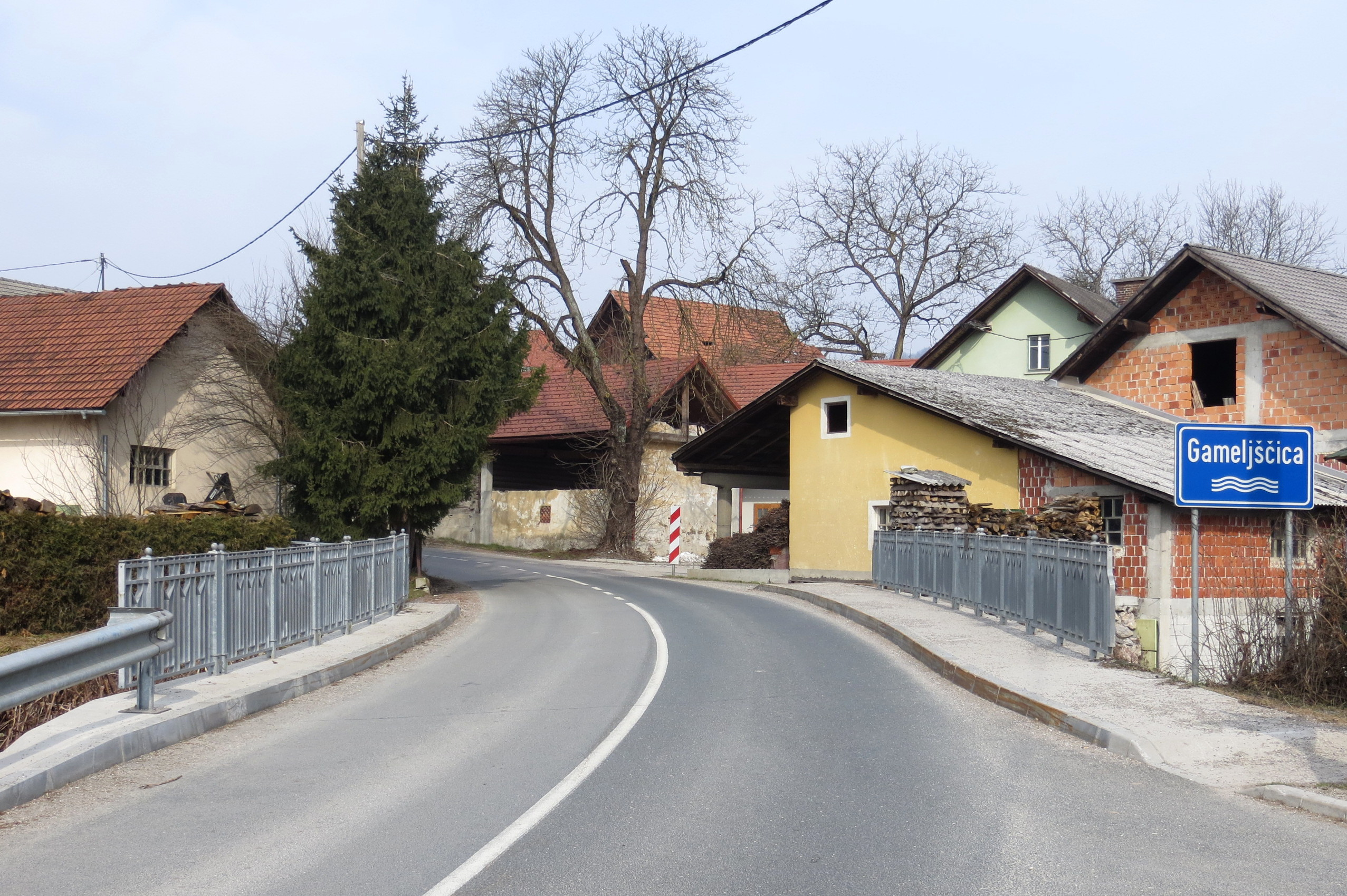
Bridge over Gameljščica Creek in Spodnje Gameljne

Spodnje Gameljne is a clustered village along the road from Šmartno to Črnuče and along Gameljščica Creek, which empties into the Sava River southeast of the village. The soil is sandy and there are fields to the southwest, toward the Sava. There is a fish hatchery below the village on the Sava.

== Name ==
The name Spodnje Gameljne means 'lower Gameljne', distinguishing the settlement from Zgornje Gameljne 'upper Gameljne' and Srednje Gameljne 'middle Gameljne'. The settlement was attested in written sources in 1260 as Gemlein (and as Gemleyn in 1295, Gaͤmelein in 1338). The name developed via dialect pronunciation from the older form *Gamljine—also a plural, probably reflecting the fact that there have been three such settlements since at least the mid-15th century. The name is probably based on a form such as *Gamľa (vьsь) 'Gamъ's (village)', referring to some early inhabitant of the place.

== Church ==
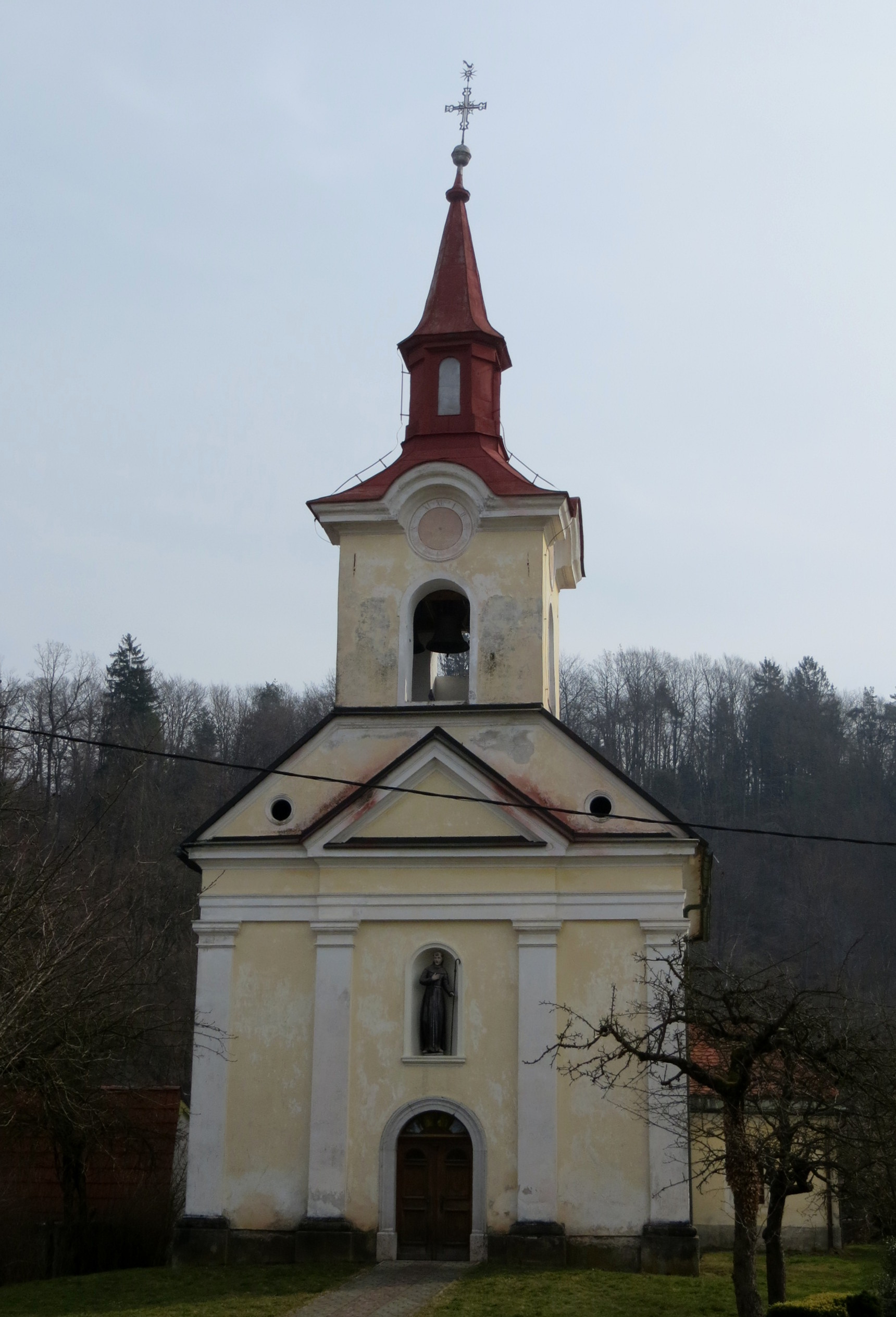
Saint Leonard's Church

The local church is dedicated to Saint Leonard and belongs to the Parish of Šmartno pod Šmarno Goro. It was a 17th-century building that was rebuilt in 1877, although it retains some of its original elements.
