= Dragutin Mate =

Slovenian diplomat and politician

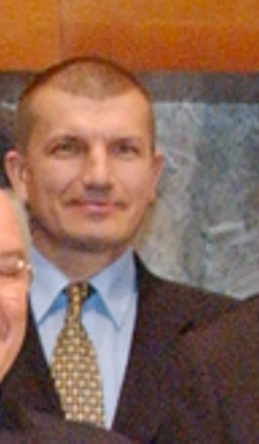

Minister of Interior
- In office 2004–2008
- Prime Minister: Janez Janša
- Preceded by: Rado Bohinc
- Succeeded by: Katarina Kresal

Personal details
- Born: May 2, 1963 (age 63) Čakovec, Croatia, Socialist Federal Republic of Yugoslavia
- Party: Slovenian Democratic Party (2008–2016)
- Profession: Diplomat, politician

Dragutin Mate (born 2 May 1963) is a former Slovenian diplomat and politician of Croat origins. He was a member of the Slovenian Democratic Party (2008–2016). Between 2004 and 2008 he served as Minister of Interior in the centre-right government led by Janez Janša and between 2011 and 2014, he was a deputy in the National Assembly.

== Biography ==
Mate was born in Čakovec, Croatia, (then part of the Socialist Federal Republic of Yugoslavia) to Croatian parents. He spent his childhood in the city of Maribor in eastern Slovenia, where his parents moved for professional reasons. He graduated from the Faculty of Social Sciences at the University of Ljubljana. In 1989 he started working as a high school teacher at the Poljane Grammar School in Ljubljana.

In 1990, after the victory of the Democratic Opposition of Slovenia in the first free elections in Slovenia, he got employed at the Slovenian Ministry of Defence. He became head of the department of Civil Protection at the ministry, later moving to the counter-intelligence section. He participated in the Slovenian Independence War of June 1991. In 1992, he became the main adviser for international cooperation in the Defence Minister's Office. After 1994, he switched to the diplomatic service. Between 1996 and 2000, he served as the Slovenian military attaché in Bosnia and Herzegovina. Between 2000 and 2004 he resumed work at the Ministry of Defence. In 2004 he was appointed as Minister of Interior in the cabinet of Janez Janša. After the victory of the left-wing coalition led by Borut Pahor in the 2008 parliamentary elections, he was replaced by Katarina Kresal.

On 17 February he and two other members were excluded and replaced on the Executive Council (Izvršni odbor) of the SDS due to inactivity. On 21 February 2016 he resigned his membership in the SDS due to "decline of internal democracy" in the party.

== See also ==
- Croats of Slovenia

Political offices
Preceded by Rado Bohinc	Minister of the Interior; 9 November 2004–24 November 2008	Succeeded by Katarina Kresal

== Sources ==
- Biography on the Ministry of defence webpage
- Biography on the webpage of the Slovenian Government
- Profile in the magazine Mladina
