= Rašica, Ljubljana =

Rašica
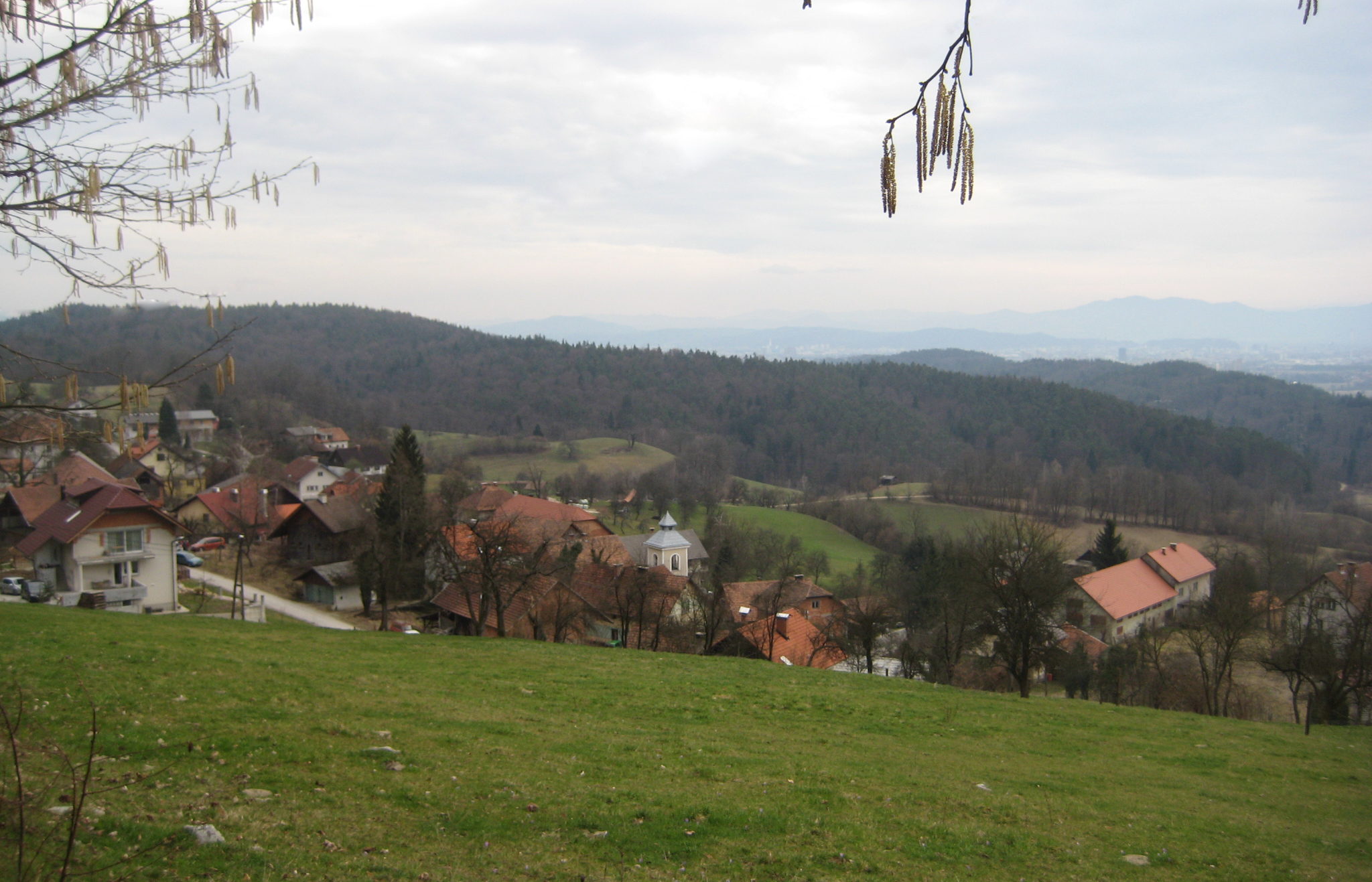

- Location in Slovenia
- Coordinates: 46°8′8.26″N 14°30′35.53″E
- Country: Slovenia
- Traditional region: Upper Carniola
- Statistical region: Central Slovenia
- Municipality: Ljubljana

Area
  - Total: 1.89 km^{2} (0.73 sq mi)
- Elevation: 421.2 m (1,382 ft)

Population (2002)
  - Total: 133
- Postal code: 1211

Rašica (pronounced [ɾaˈʃiːtsa]; German: Uranschitz) is a small village in the hills above Srednje Gameljne north of the capital Ljubljana in central Slovenia. It belongs to the City Municipality of Ljubljana. It is part of the traditional region of Upper Carniola and is now included with the rest of the municipality in the Central Slovenia Statistical Region.

== Geography ==
Rašica is a clustered village on a westward-facing sun-exposed slope below Stane Kosec Peak (Slovene: Vrh Staneta Kosca), a 641-meter (2,103 ft) limestone elevation. The core of the settlement lies on both sides of the road to Srednje Gameljne. The steep limestone Reber Ridge rises above the village and contains karst caves. Below the ridge is a cliff known as Pod šitom, and higher up are Cottage Cave (Zidanica), which was inhabited in prehistoric times, Big Cave (Velika jama), Fox Cave (Lisičja jama, also known as Kurja jama 'Chicken Cave' or Volčja jama 'Wolf Cave'), and Devil's Cave (Hudičeva jama). The soil in the area is loamy. There is a grassy valley below the village with shale deposits, where the headwaters of Črnušnica Creek (also known as Črnuče Creek, Crnuški potok) gather, later joined by Dog Creek (Pasji potok). There are tilled fields along the level areas between the farms are around the village. The water main is fed by Ulrich's Spring (Urhov studenec) and Shrine Spring (Pod znamenjem).

== Name ==
Rašica was attested in written sources in 1260 as Wrenschitz. The Slovenian name of the village was originally *Vranščica, derived from the personal name *Vran via the adjective *vranski, referring to an early inhabitant of the area. The name is unrelated to that of the village of Rašica near Velike Lašče. In the past, the village was known as Uranschitz in German.

== History ==
During the Second World War, German forces burned the village on September 20, 1941 and evicted the population in retaliation for an attack on a convoy of German cars two days earlier. This was the first village in Slovenia to suffer this fate. A lookout tower and shelter were built on the peak above the village in 1957. On September 21, 1958, Rašica Peak was renamed Stane Kosec Peak (Slovene: Vrh Staneta Kosca) in honor of the Partisan Stane Kosec.

== Church ==
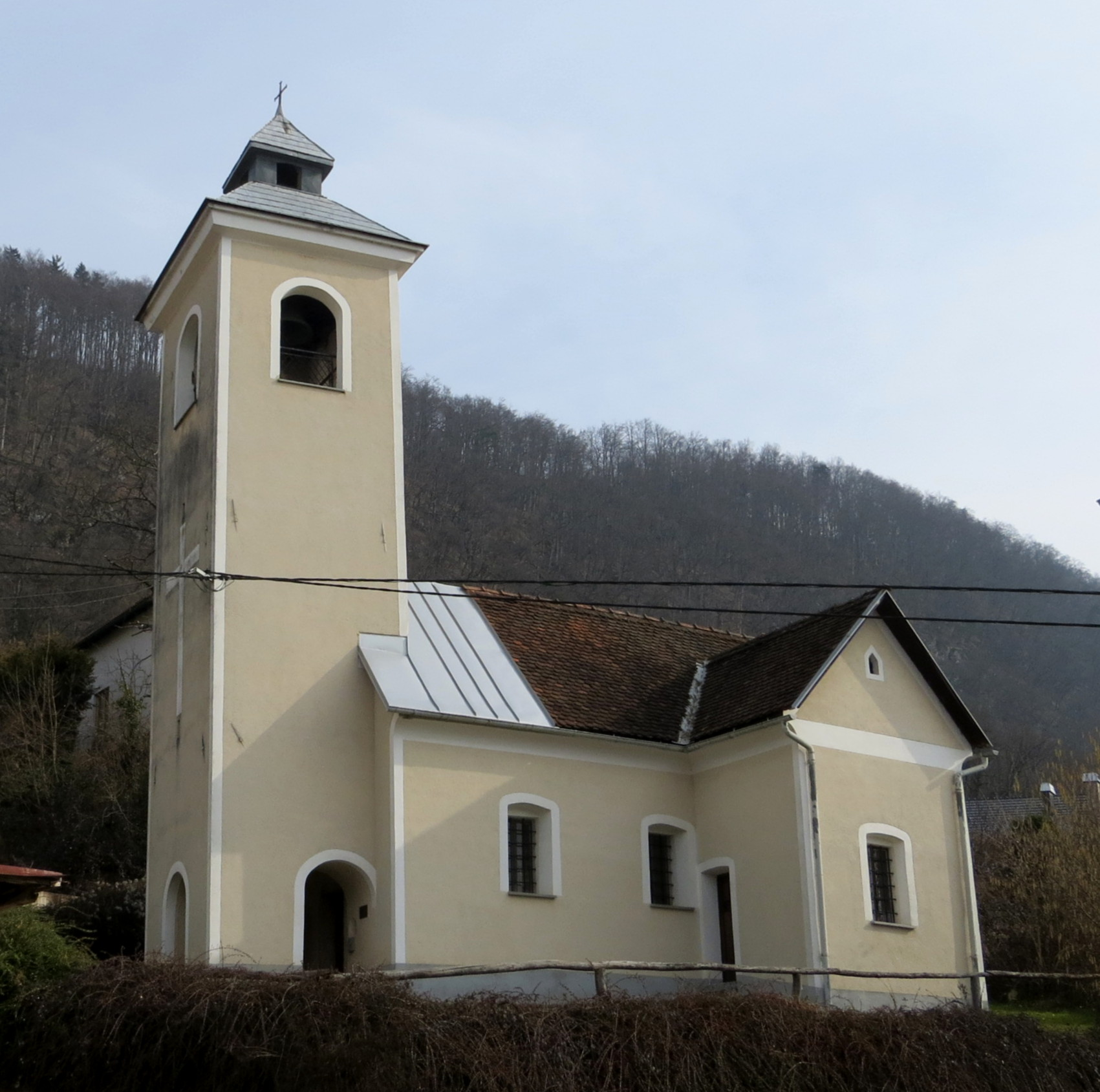
Exterior, view from west

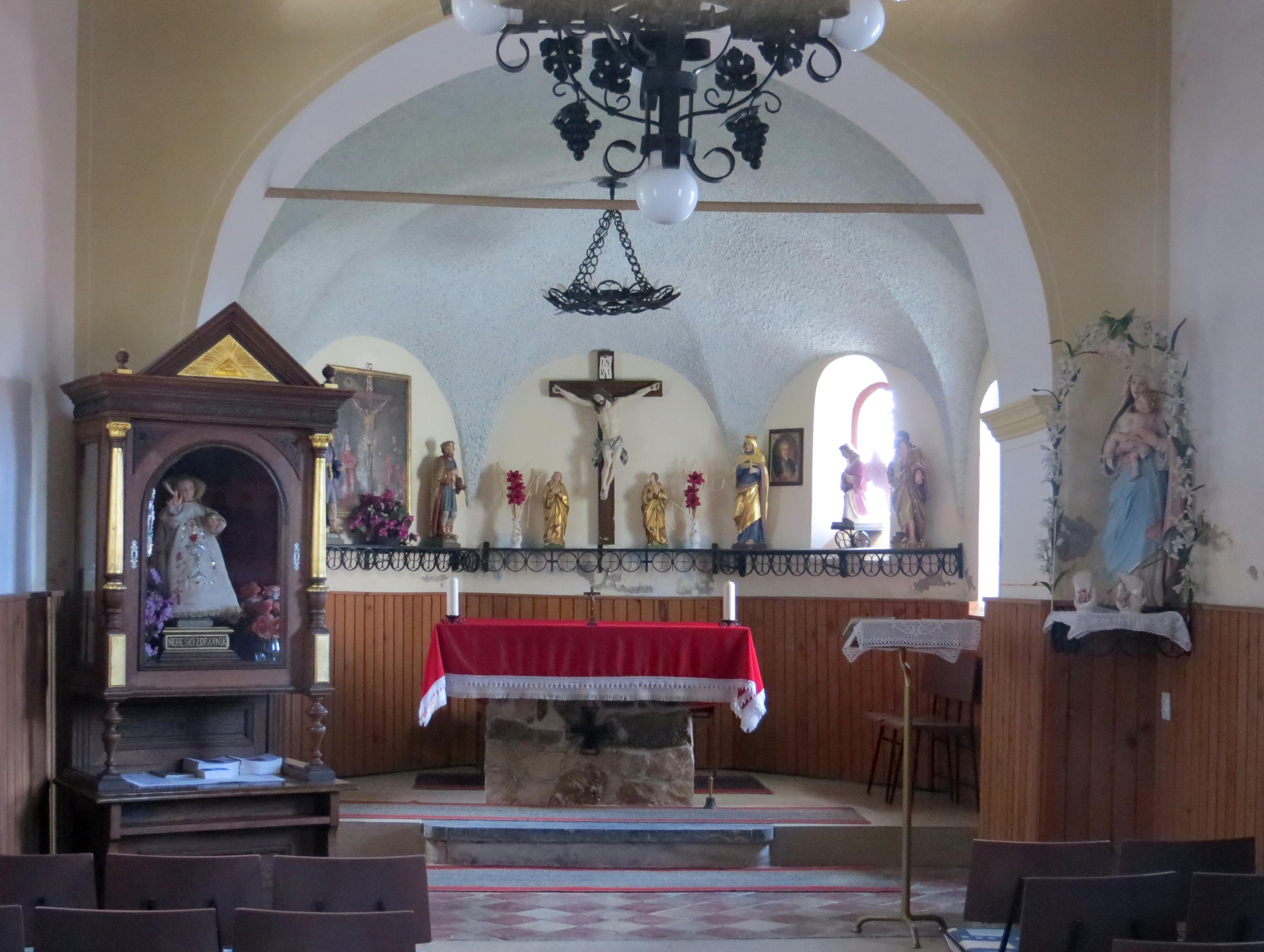
Interior

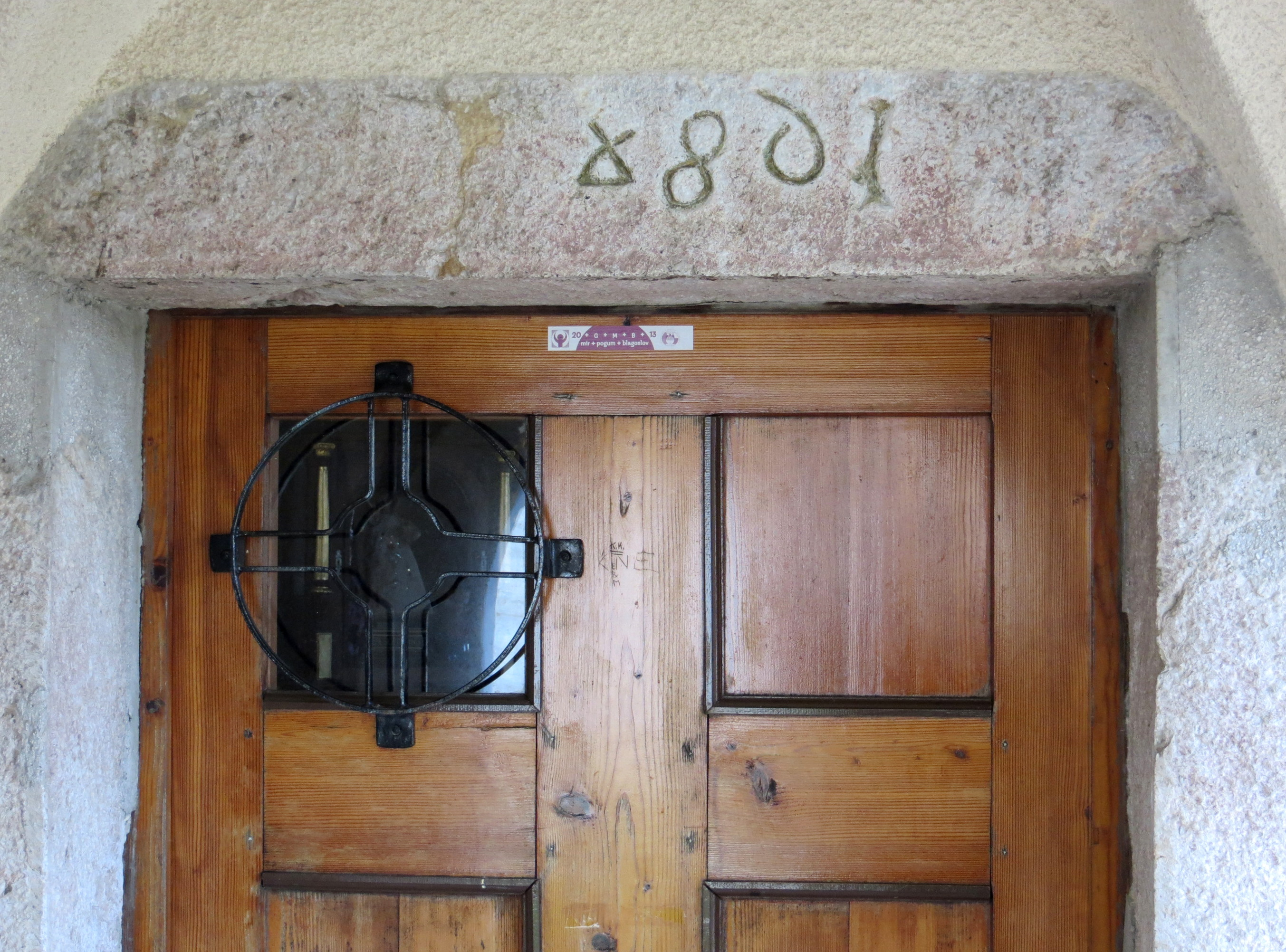
Door casing, dated 1684

Holy Cross Church

The local church is dedicated to the Holy Cross and belongs to the Parish of Šmartno pod Šmarno Goro. It was first mentioned in written documents dating to 1526. In 1941 it was burned down together with the village. It was restored in 1968, preserving its original layout.

== Notable people ==
Notable people that were born or lived in Rašica include:

- Stane Kosec (1913–1941), Partisan, proclaimed a People's Hero of Yugoslavia in 1953
