= Srednje Gameljne =

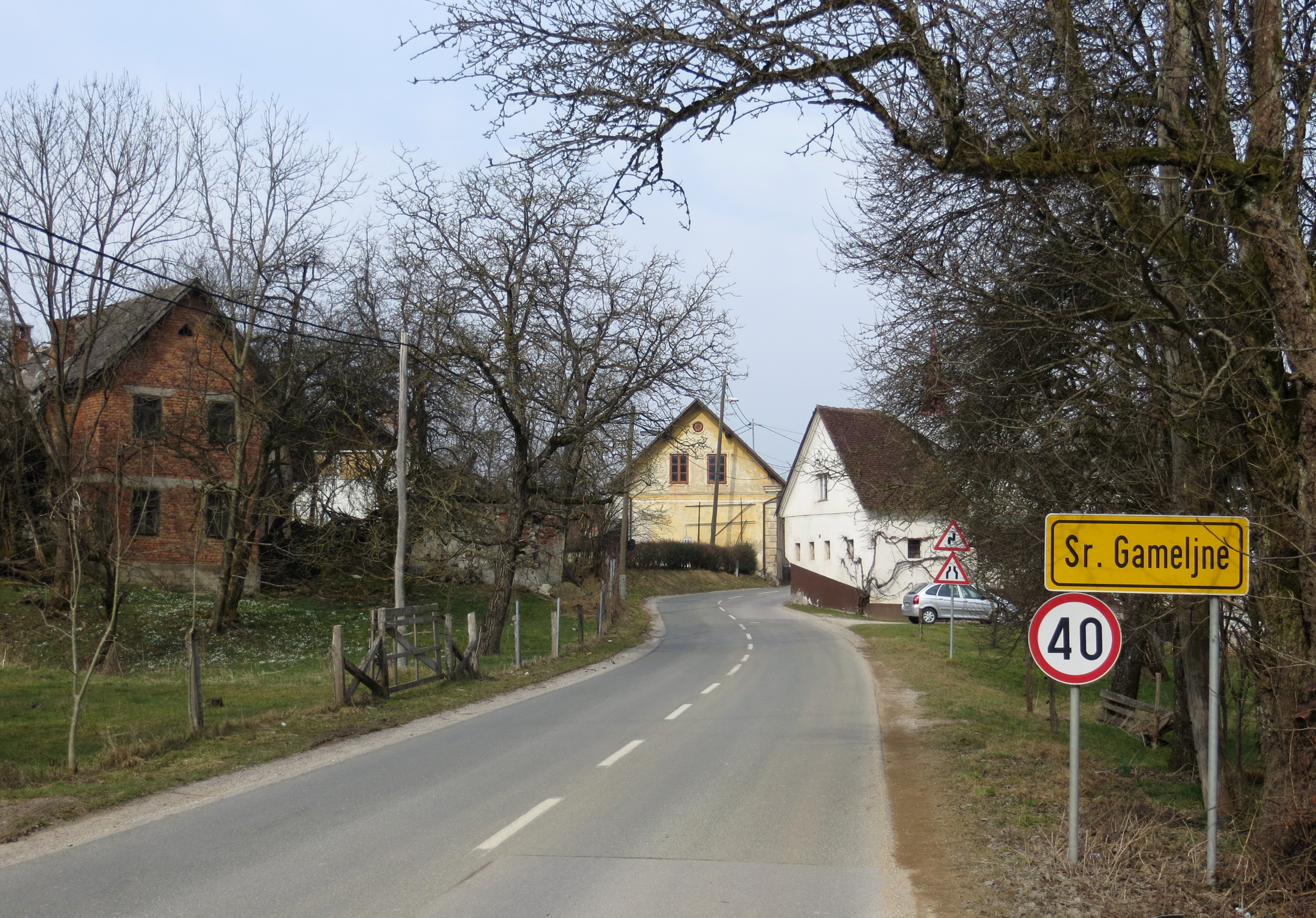

- Location in Slovenia
- Coordinates: 46°7′43.18″N 14°30′2.67″E
- Country: Slovenia
- Traditional region: Upper Carniola
- Statistical region: Central Slovenia
- Municipality: Ljubljana

Area
  - Total: 1.65 km^{2} (0.64 sq mi)
- Elevation: 323.4 m (1,061 ft)

Population (2002)
  - Total: 610
- Postal code: 1211

Srednje Gameljne (pronounced [ˈsɾeːdnjɛ ˈɡaːməlnɛ]; German: Mittergamling) lies north of the capital Ljubljana in central Slovenia. It belongs to the City Municipality of Ljubljana. It is part of the traditional region of Upper Carniola and is now included with the rest of the municipality in the Central Slovenia Statistical Region.

== Geography ==
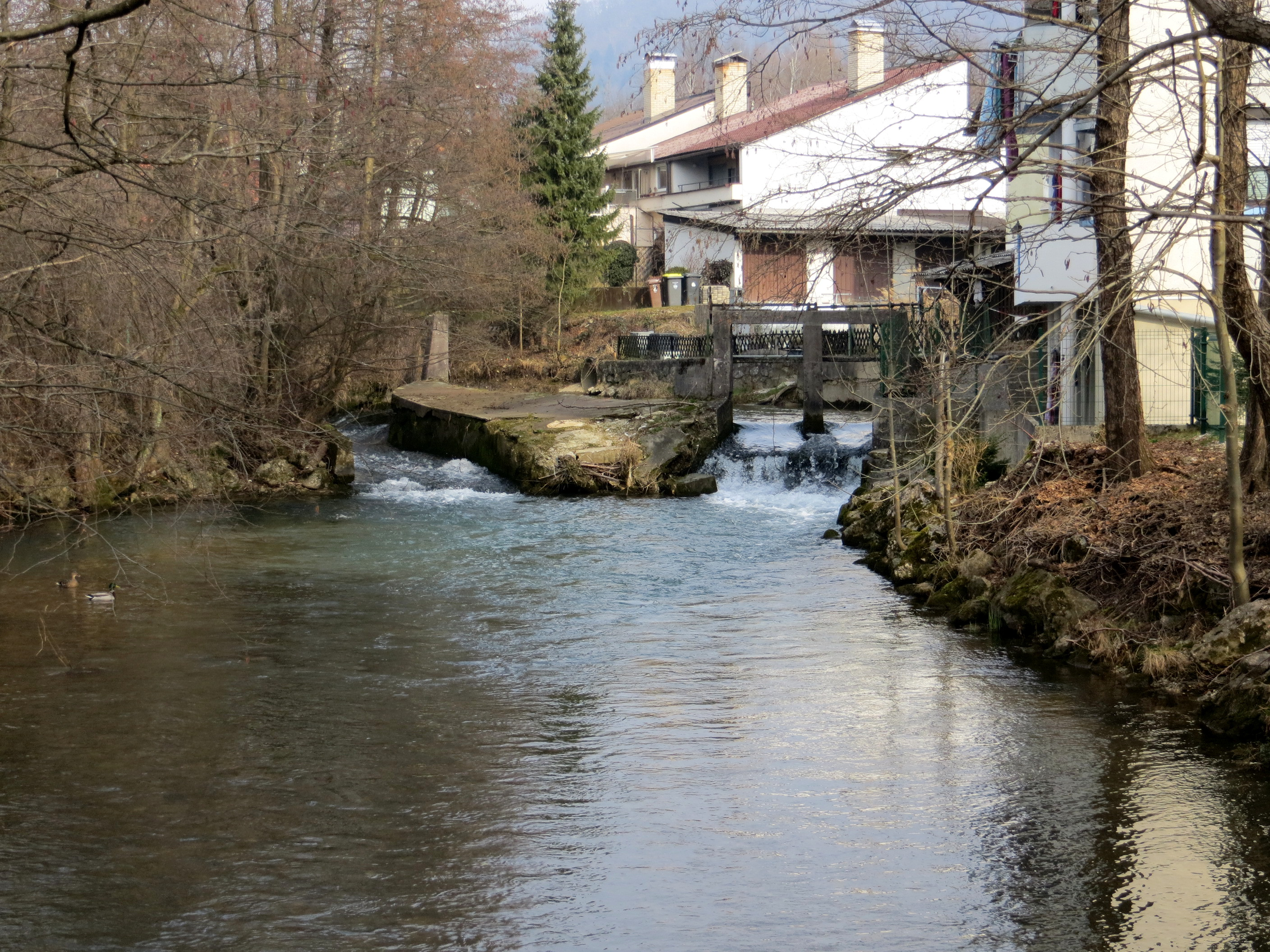
Gameljščica Creek in Srednje Gameljne

Srednje Gameljne is a ribbon village along the road from Šmartno to Črnuče along Gameljščica Creek and the southwest slope of Rašica Hill (Slovene: Rašiški hrib), where new residential housing was built in the 20th century. The soil is loamy.

== Name ==
The name Srednje Gameljne means 'middle Gameljne', distinguishing the settlement from Zgornje Gameljne 'upper Gameljne' and Spodnje Gameljne 'lower Gameljne'. The settlement was attested in written sources in 1260 as Gemlein (and as Gemleyn in 1295, Gaͤmelein in 1338, and von Mitteren Gamling in 1450). The name developed via dialect pronunciation from the older form *Gamljine—also a plural, probably reflecting the fact that there have been three such settlements since at least the mid-15th century. The name is probably based on a form such as *Gamľa (vьsь) 'Gamъ's (village)', referring to some early inhabitant of the place.

== Church ==
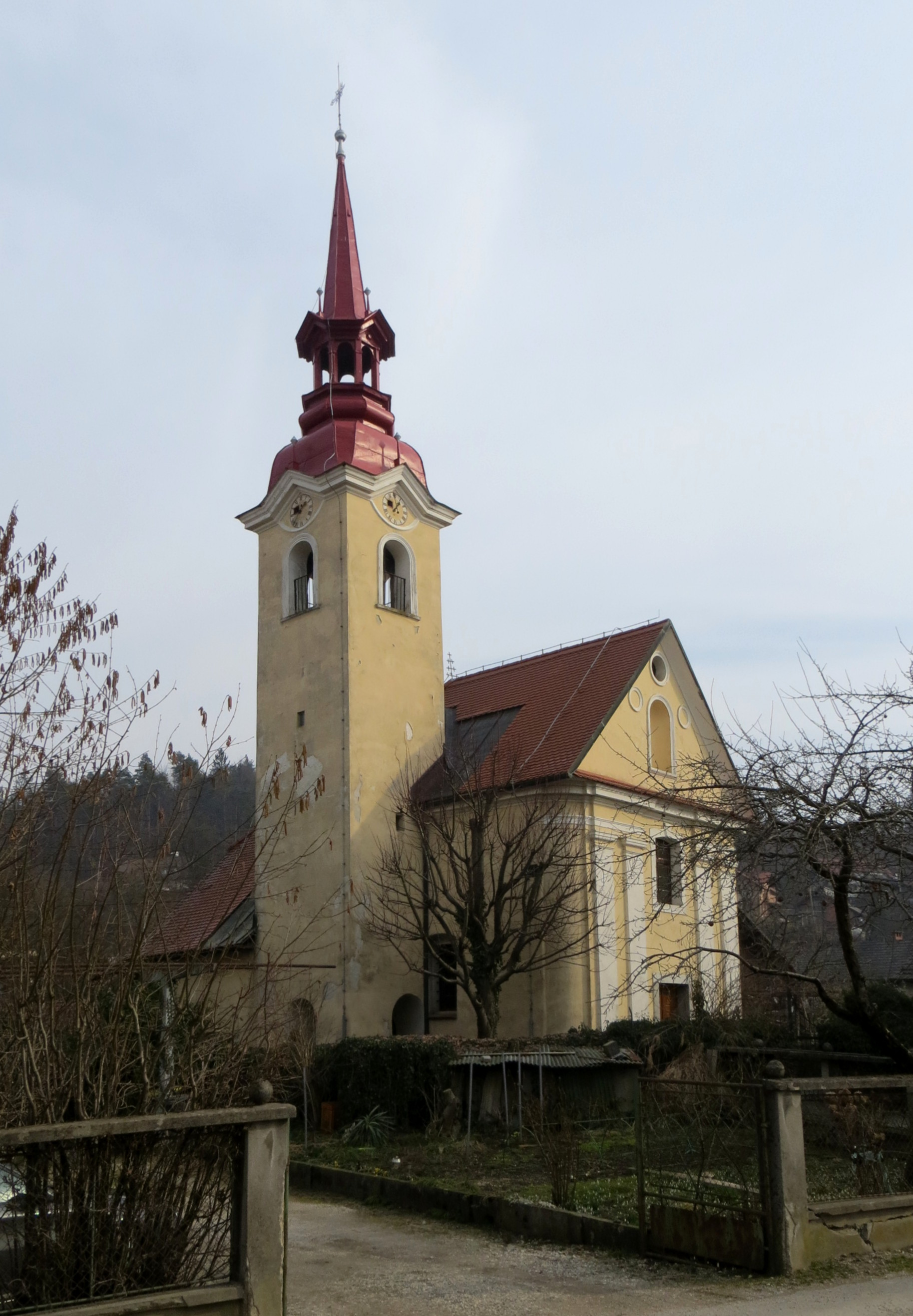
Saint Andrew's Church

The local church is dedicated to Saint Andrew and belongs to the Parish of Šmartno pod Šmarno Goro. It dates to the second half of the 18th century.
