= Rašica, Velike Lašče =

Rašica
- Village
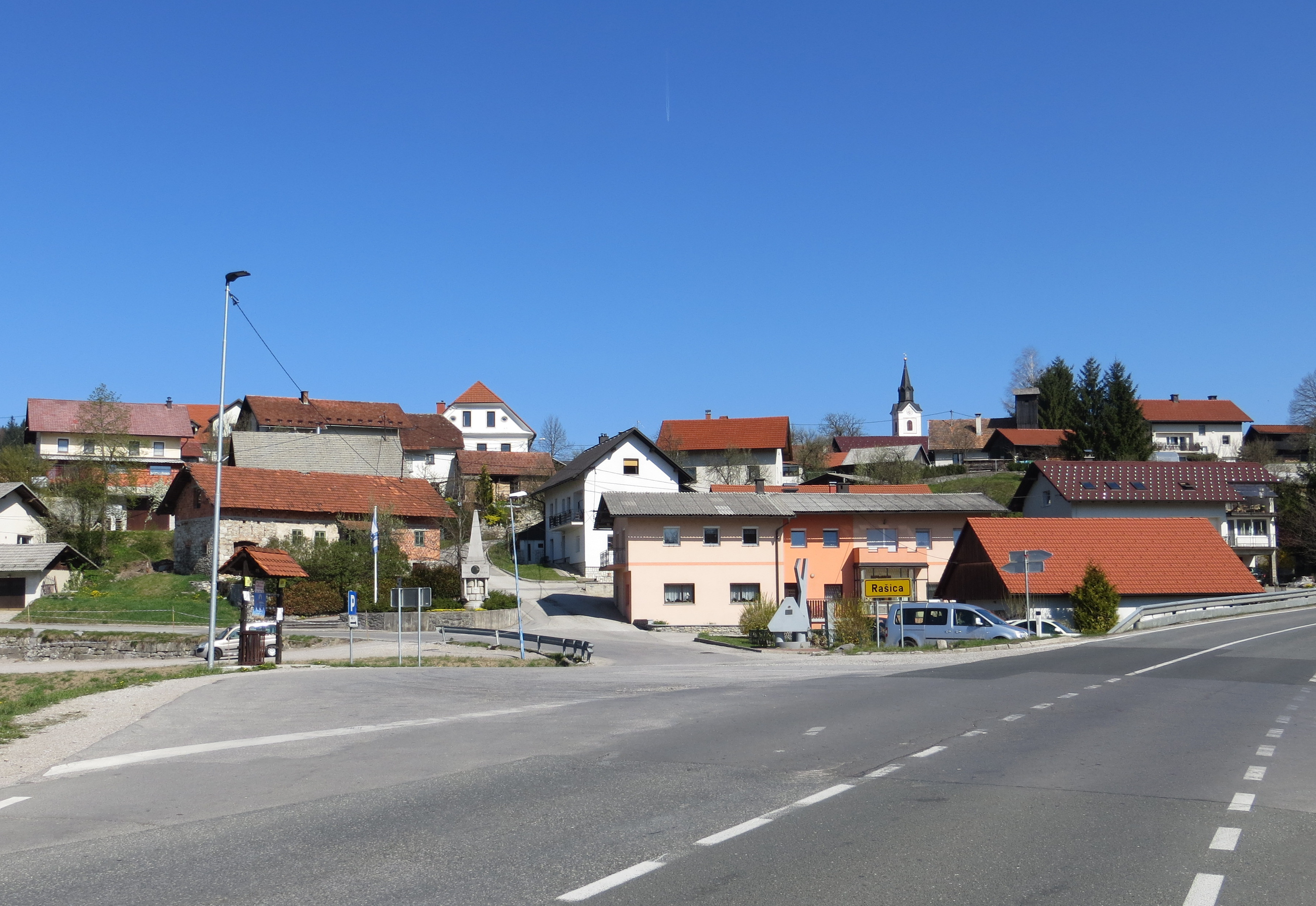

- Location in Slovenia
- Coordinates: 45°51′11.73″N 14°37′24.5″E
- Country: Slovenia
- Traditional region: Lower Carniola
- Statistical region: Central Slovenia
- Municipality: Velike Lašče

Area
  - Total: 3.7 km^{2} (1.4 sq mi)
- Elevation: 498.9 m (1,637 ft)

Population (2002)
  - Total: 227
- Postal code: 1315

Rašica (pronounced [ˈɾaːʃitsa]) is a village north of Velike Lašče in central Slovenia. The area is part of the traditional region of Lower Carniola and is now included in the Central Slovenia Statistical Region.

== Name ==
Rašica was attested in historical sources in 1230 as Reschwiz (and as Reschicz in 1260 and Rasczicz in 1436). The name was originally a hydronym, referring to Rašica Creek south of the village. The name is derived from the common noun raka 'wooden cladding preventing water erosion of a bank' or 'cladded chute carrying water to a mill'. Both the Slovene and German names are ultimately derived from Latin arca 'box'. The name is unrelated to that of the village of Rašica near Ljubljana.

== Church ==
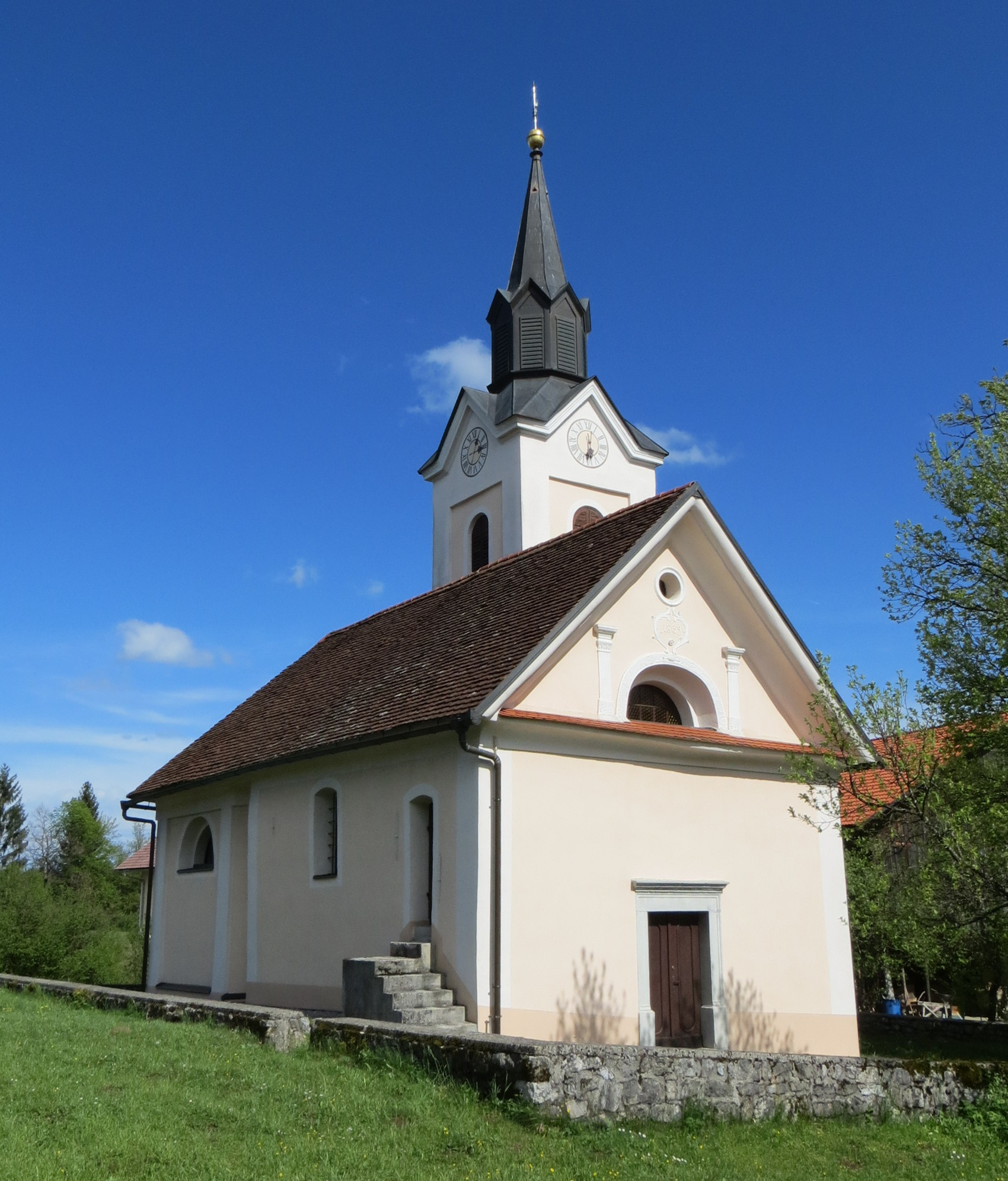
Saint Bartholomew's Church

The local church is dedicated to Saint Bartholomew (Slovene: sveti Jernej). It was built in the early 17th century on the site of an older building. In 1765 it was remodeled in the Baroque style and in 1839 its facade was replaced.

== Notable people ==
Rašica is best known as the birthplace of the Slovene Protestant reformer Primož Trubar. Trubar was born in the village in 1508. What remains on the site of the Trubar farm—a 200-year-old sawmill and a more recent barn—have been arranged into a small museum with a printing workshop and gallery.
