= Opinion polling for the 2014 Slovenian parliamentary election =

In the run up to the 2014 Slovenian parliamentary election, various organisations carried out opinion polling to gauge voting intention in Slovenia. Results of such polls are displayed in this article.

The date range for these opinion polls are from the previous general election, held on 14 December 2011, to the day the next election was held, on 13 July 2014.

== Party vote ==
Poll results are listed in the table below in reverse chronological order, showing the most recent first. The highest percentage figure in each polling survey is displayed in bold, and the background shaded in the leading party's colour. In the instance that there is a tie, then no figure is shaded. The lead column on the right shows the percentage-point difference between the two parties with the highest figures. Poll results use the date the survey's fieldwork was done, as opposed to the date of publication. However, if such date is unknown, the date of publication will be given instead.

Date	Polling Firm	SMC	PS	SDS	SD	DL	DeSUS	SLS	NSi	ZL	ZaAB	Others	Lead
**13 Jul**	**Election Results**	**34.5**	**3.0**	**20.7**	**6.0**	**0.6**	**10.2**	**3.9**	**5.6**	**6.0**	**4.4**	**5.8**	**13.8**
13 Jul (19:00)	Mediana	**36.9**	2.8	19.2	5.8	0.6	9.7	3.3	5.4	7.1	4.7	4.5	17.7
Exit polls
9–11 Jul	Ninamedia (Note: This survey shows its poll results without disregarding those who are undecided or said they will abstain from voting (either physically or by voting blank). In order to obtain results comparable to other surveys and the official election results, the result shown in this table will be that obtained, with a simple rule of three, from disregarding undecided and/or abstaining voters from the totals offered in the survey.)	**31.0**	3.3	26.1	8.8	—	11.5	3.5	3.5	3.9	4.4	3.9	4.9
5–11 Jul	Episcentra	**33.4**	1.5	21.3	9.3	0.1	10.3	4.2	6.3	4.2	5.9	3.6	12.1
8–10 Jul	Ninamedia	**30.8**	2.4	28.4	8.8	—	11.2	2.7	4.6	2.7	3.6	4.7	2.4
7–10 Jul	Mediana	**32.4**	4.0	23.7	5.9	0.8	12.2	3.7	5.7	2.9	3.0	6.2	8.7
2–9 Jul	Episcentra	**33.6**	1.2	24.0	8.2	0.2	10.5	4.5	6.1	2.7	5.4	3.3	9.6
6–8 Jul	Ninamedia	**31.8**	2.4	24.9	6.7	0.2	13.4	3.5	4.5	2.9	4.0	5.7	6.9
30 Jun–8 Jul	Episcentra	**34.5**	1.9	25.5	6.9	0.4	9.8	4.3	5.4	2.5	5.0	4.0	9.0
4–6 Jul	Ninamedia	**34.3**	3.4	25.2	5.2	0.2	10.7	3.2	6.7	2.4	3.4	5.4	9.1
30 Jun–5 Jul	Episcentra	**36.8**	2.4	25.0	7.3	0.2	9.1	4.7	5.0	1.3	4.1	4.1	11.8
2–3 Jul	RM Plus	**33.3**	3.1	28.1	5.5	0.2	8.7	2.2	7.1	2.2	3.5	3.0	5.2
26 Jun–2 Jul	Episcentra	**38.5**	3.1	25.1	6.2	0.2	8.7	4.1	5.6	1.2	3.5	3.7	13.4
30 Jun–1 Jul	UvNG	**37.3**	2.3	24.5	9.6	0.6	10.6	2.9	4.4	2.8	2.0	2.8	12.8
25–28 Jun	Episcentra	**37.9**	3.3	25.0	5.9	0.0	9.6	5.2	5.1	1.6	2.7	5.3	12.9
23–26 Jun	Mediana	**33.9**	—	20.6	10.5	<1.5	8.4	5.1	3.3	2.7	4.8	>9.2	13.3
22–25 Jun	Ninamedia	**31.2**	3.8	29.5	8.7	0.9	7.2	3.0	6.5	2.6	3.6	3.0	1.7
9–14 Jun	Episcentra	**35.2**	2.0	23.6	8.1	0.7	8.4	3.2	6.8	2.8	2.5	6.6	11.6
10–11 Jun	Mediana	**30.0**	3.3	23.4	10.9	1.1	9.2	5.1	5.1	2.2	2.5	7.5	6.6
**25 May**	**EP Election**	—	**6.6**	**24.8**	**8.1**	**1.1**	**8.1**	**16.6**		**5.5**	—	**29.2**	**8.2**
15–17 Apr	Ninamedia	—	12.7	26.7	**27.4**	3.2	10.4	5.9	7.2	0.7	—	5.7	0.7
8–16 Apr	Episcentra	—	8.3	**24.7**	24.2	2.1	5.0	5.8	6.9	4.2 (Note: As the sum of its constituent parties.)	—	18.9	0.5
18–20 Mar	Ninamedia	—	9.6	**29.8**	23.8	2.3	10.9	5.4	6.9	4.0	—	7.3	6.0
14–19 Mar	Episcentra	—	5.7	23.8	**24.0**	5.5	8.0	4.2	8.4	5.9	—	14.6	0.2
18–20 Feb	Ninamedia	—	11.1	**24.4**	23.3	2.6	15.9	7.4	9.4	—	—	6.2	1.1
10–14 Feb	FUDŠ	—	12.5	**25.7**	21.4	2.0	14.2	4.0	4.3	—	—	16.1	4.3
24–26 Jan	RM Plus	—	18.9	**30.6**	20.2	2.3	9.7	3.8	5.1	—	—	9.4	10.4
13–22 Jan	Episcentra	—	8.2	16.6	**26.6**	3.0	9.7	6.9	6.0	—	—	22.9	10.0
14–16 Jan	Ninamedia	—	15.0	20.9	**26.7**	3.4	12.2	6.8	9.0	—	—	6.2	5.8
13–16 Jan	Slovenian Beat	—	14.2	19.9	**23.3**	1.0	7.4	3.4	7.8	—	—	22.9	3.4
2014
20–21 Dec	RM Plus	—	12.6	**32.0**	18.5	3.9	11.5	2.8	7.0	—	—	11.8	13.5
9–17 Dec	Episcentra	—	8.5	17.7	**28.4**	2.3	9.0	4.2	8.9	—	—	21.2	10.7
2013
**4 Dec 2011**	**Election Results**	—	**28.5**	**26.2**	**10.5**	**8.4**	**7.0**	**6.8**	**4.9**	**1.9**	—	**5.8**	**2.3**
