= Integrity plan =

Integrity plan is a tool for establishing and verifying the integrity of the organization. It is a documented process for assessing the level of vulnerability of an organisation, its exposure to unethical and corruption practices. It helps individual institution to assess corruption risks and manage them efficiently. Corruption risks are identified through general assessment of institution's exposure to corruption and description of institution's areas and manners of decision-making with the assessment of exposure to corruption risks. In order to achieve best assessment all persons involved in different operational procedures within the institution should participate. This enables better insight and more qualitative identification of corruption risks, following by better measures for minimizing or elimination. General assessment and placement of an institution into a certain group on the basis of exposure to corruption risks (the least, medium and most exposed) enables to better address factors of corruption risks.

The main goal of integrity plan is to strengthen integrity and anti-corruption culture in a public sector by identifying risks, planning and implementing adequate measures. With putting in place an overall integrity plan system, causes of corruption will be eliminated, which will result in strengthening the rule of law and people's confidence in the institutions.

== Slovenia ==
Sixth chapter of Slovenia's Integrity and Prevention of Corruption Act provides legal basis and obligation that all state bodies, self-governing local communities, public agencies, public institutes, public utility institutes and public funds shall draw up and adopt integrity plan and inform the Commission for the Prevention of Corruption of the Republic of Slovenia by sending it a copy of their integrity plan.

== See also ==
- Black swan event
- Bribery
- Corruption
- Crisis management
- Ethics
- Integrity
- Government ethics
- Legal ethics
