= 2014 Slovenian parliamentary election =

- 13 July 2014

All 90 seats in the National Assembly 46 seats needed for a majority
- Turnout: 50.99% (▼14.61pp)
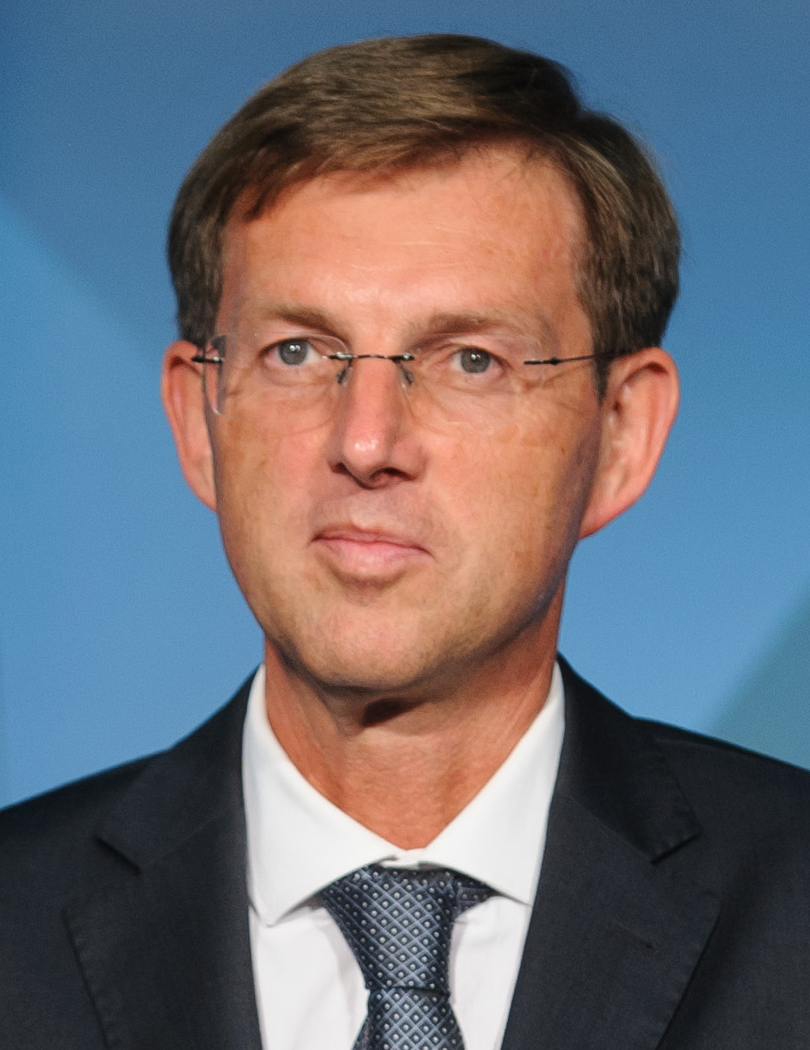

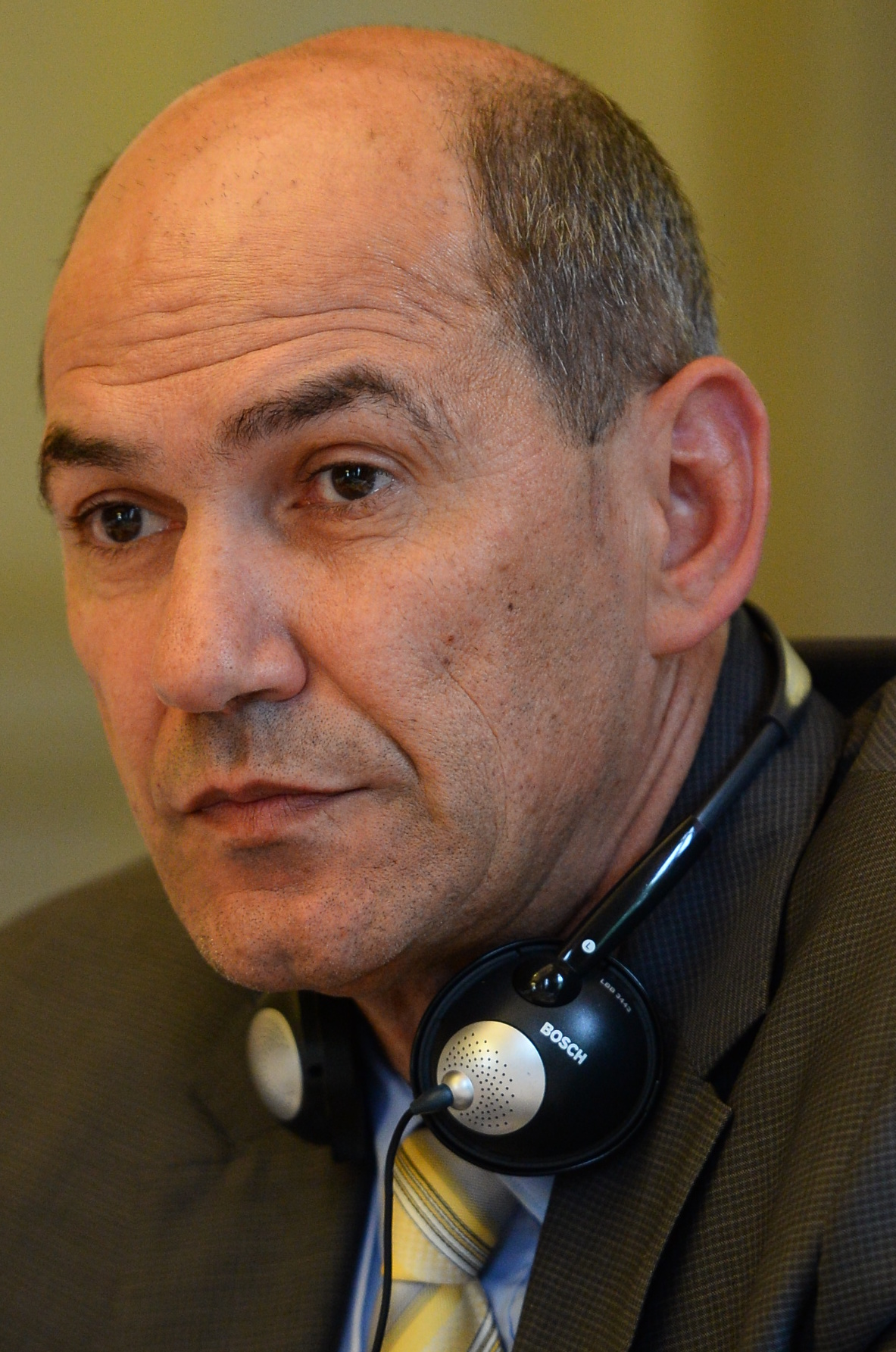

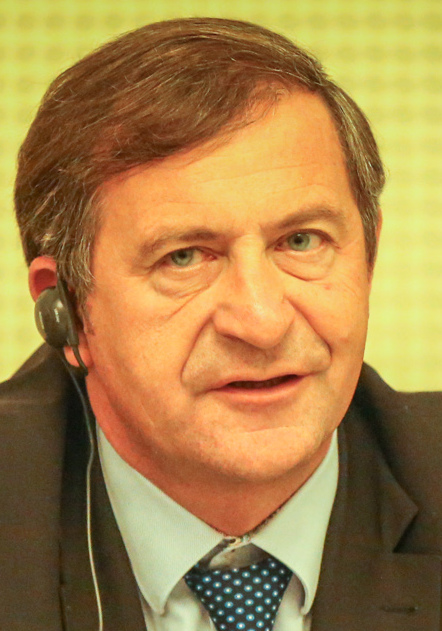

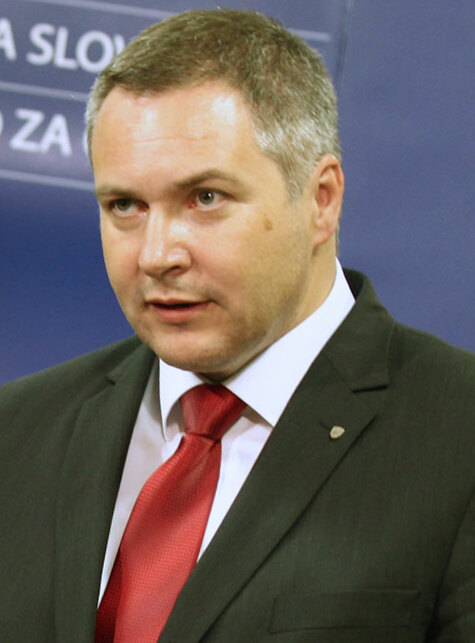

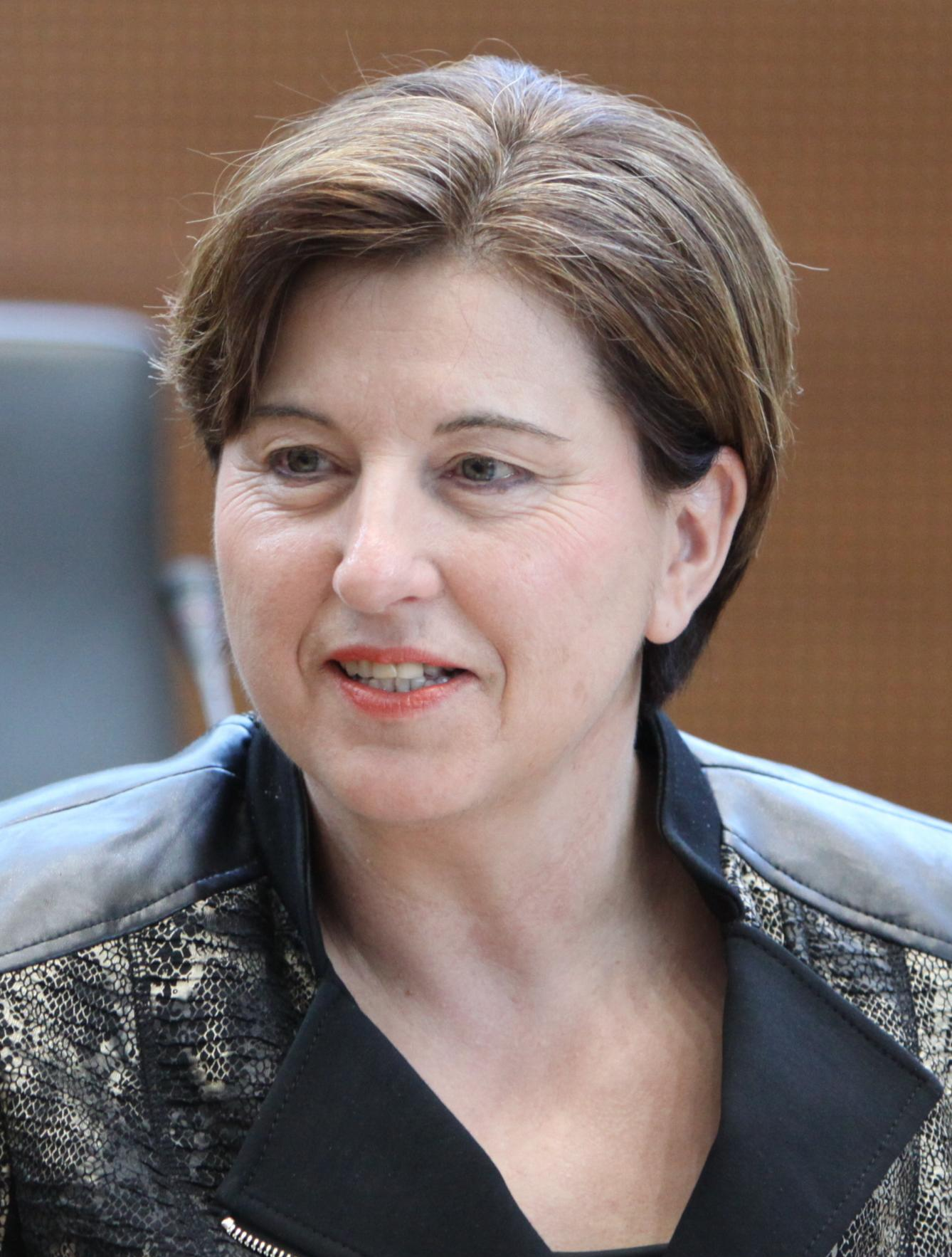

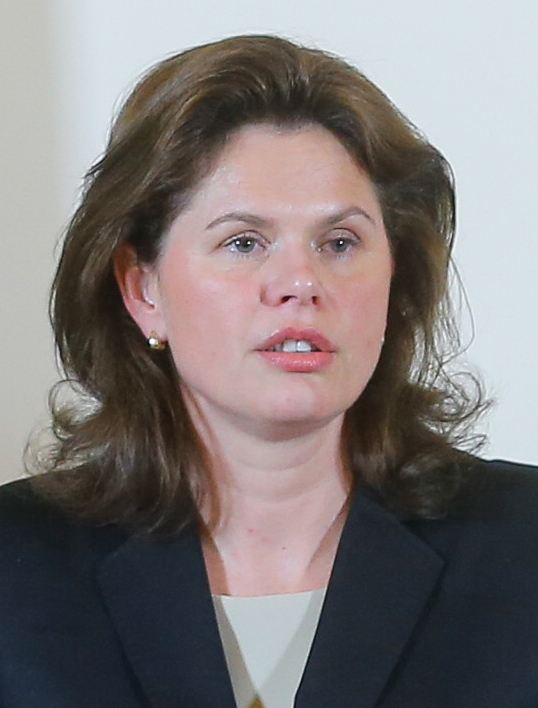
	First party	Second party	Third party
Leader	Miro Cerar	Janez Janša	Karl Erjavec
Party	SMC	SDS	DeSUS
Last election	–	26.19%, 26 seats	6.97%. 6 seats
Seats won	36	21	10
Seat change	New	▼5	▲4
Popular vote	298,342	178,294	88,026
Percentage	34.61%	20.69%	10.21%
	Fourth party	Fifth party	Sixth party
Leader	Dejan Židan	Collective leadership	Ljudmila Novak
Party	SD	ZL	NSi
Last election	10.52%, 10 seats	–	4.88%, 4 seats
Seats won	6	6	5
Seat change	▼4	New	▲1
Popular vote	52,249	52,189	48,846
Percentage	5.98%	5.97%	5.59%
	Seventh party
Leader	Alenka Bratušek
Party	ZaAB
Last election	–
Seats won	4
Seat change	New
Popular vote	38,293
Percentage	4.38%
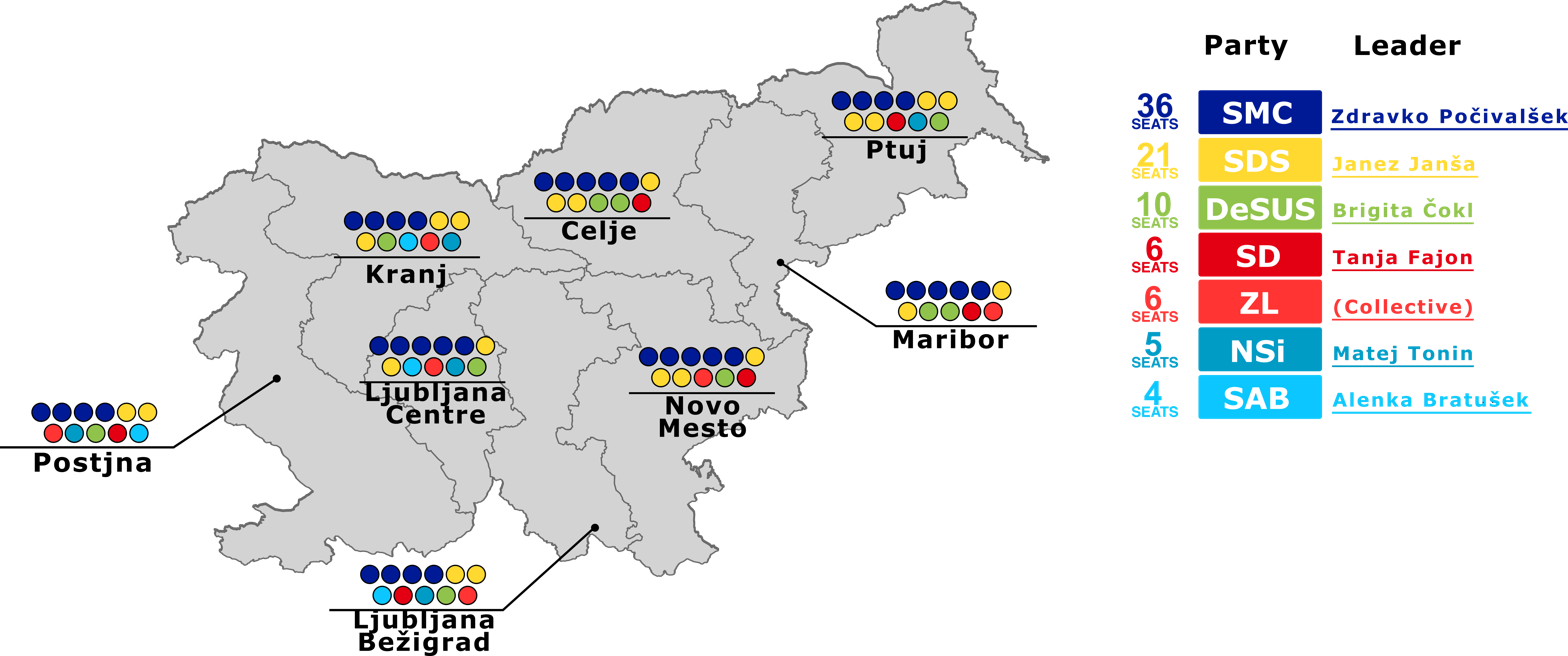
- Results by constituency
Prime Minister before election
Alenka Bratušek
SAB
Prime Minister after election
Miro Cerar
SMC

Parliamentary elections were held in Slovenia on 13 July 2014 to elect the 90 deputies of the National Assembly. The early election, less than three years after the previous one, was called following the resignation of Alenka Bratušek's government in May. Seventeen parties participated, including seven new parties, some of which formed only months before the election took place. Party of Miro Cerar (SMC), a new party led by lawyer and professor Miro Cerar, won the election with over 34% of the vote and 36 seats. Seven political parties won seats in the National Assembly. Three political parties left the Assembly, including Zoran Janković's Positive Slovenia, the winner of the 2011 election, and the Slovenian People's Party, which failed to win a seat for the first time since the first elections in 1990. A leftist United Left party entered the Assembly for the first time, winning six seats.

== Background ==
After the previous elections in 2011, a right-leaning five-party coalition government was formed, composed of the Slovenian Democratic Party (SDS), Civic List (DL), Democratic Party of Pensioners of Slovenia (DeSUS), Slovenian People's Party (SLS), and New Slovenia (NSi.) Janez Janša, the president of the SDS, became prime minister. Janša's government collapsed on 27 February 2013 after he was accused of corruption. Janša was later sentenced to 2 years in prison, and fined €37,000.

A new government was formed by Positive Slovenia (PS), the Social Democrats (SD), DL, and DeSUS. PS leader Alenka Bratušek became prime minister. On 25 April 2014, congress of Pozitivna Slovenija was held in Brdo pri Kranju. The main agenda was the election of the next president of the party. Two candidates applied for the post: previous president Zoran Janković and the incumbent Alenka Bratušek. Coalition parties SD, DL and DeSUS threatened to leave the government if Jankovič were elected. Janković was indeed elected, triggering Bratušek's formal resignation as the PM on 5 May.

On 1 June 2014 president of Slovenia Borut Pahor announced the dissolution of the Assembly on 2 June and that the election would take place on 13 July. Pahor's decision to call the election during a summer month triggered some opposition from civil initiatives, however, the Constitutional Court of Slovenia backed the election date.

Several new political parties entered the election, including Party of Miro Cerar (SMC) which was formally established on 2 June, and Alliance of Alenka Bratušek (ZaAB), a splinter party from Positive Slovenia, that was established on 31 May. United Left, Verjamem, and the Pirate Party took place for the first time in the European Parliament election on 25 May and participated in the national election as well. Solidarity Party agreed to enter the election together with Social Democrats, which earlier entered into an alliance with DeSUS, albeit with separate candidates lists.

Janez Janša began serving his two-year prison sentence on 20 June, which, according to the media, influenced the campaign of his party.

== Results ==
Party	Votes	%	Seats	+/–
Modern Centre Party	301,563	34.49	36	New
Slovenian Democratic Party	181,052	20.71	21	−5
Democratic Party of Pensioners of Slovenia	88,968	10.18	10	+4
Social Democrats	52,249	5.98	6	−4
United Left	52,189	5.97	6	New
New Slovenia	48,846	5.59	5	+1
Alliance of Alenka Bratušek	38,293	4.38	4	New
Slovenian People's Party	34,548	3.95	0	−6
Positive Slovenia	25,975	2.97	0	−28
Slovenian National Party	19,218	2.20	0	0
Pirate Party	11,737	1.34	0	New
Verjamem	6,800	0.78	0	New
Civic List	5,556	0.64	0	−8
Greens of Slovenia	4,629	0.53	0	0
Equal Land - Forward Slovenia	2,125	0.24	0	0
Economically Liberal Party	458	0.05	0	New
Party of Humane Slovenia	85	0.01	0	0
Hungarian and Italian minorities			2	0
Total	874,291	100.00	90	0
Valid votes	874,291	98.69		
Invalid/blank votes	11,569	1.31		
Total votes	885,860	100.00		
Registered voters/turnout	1,713,067	51.71		
Source: Volitve

== Aftermath ==
The Party of Miro Cerar (SMC) won a plurality in the election by a large margin with 36 seats. The only party that managed to win a higher percentage of the votes was Janez Drnovšek's Liberal Democracy of Slovenia at the 2000 election. Janša's Slovenian Democratic Party (SDS) came second, losing 5 seats in comparison with the 2011 election. The difference between the first two parties turned out to be higher than most of opinion polls predicted. DeSUS placed third with 10 seats, the best result in party's history. United Left won 6 seats, with tracking polls showing gaining the momentum in the last days before the election. The Social Democrats lost 4 seats and obtained their worst election result. New Slovenia won an additional mandate and the Alliance of Alenka Bratušek managed to win 4 seats. The Slovenian People's Party, Positive Slovenia (the winner of the 2011 election), and Civic List all failed to retain seats in the Assembly. All other parties also failed to reach the 4% threshold. Turnout was slightly below 51%, the lowest since Slovenian independence. On the other hand, a record 3.9% of voters voted in the early election.

In accordance with the Constitution of Slovenia, two seats are allocated to the Italian and Hungarian national communities, with one representative given to each community. Members of the Italian community elected Roberto Battelli as their representative, and members of the Hungarian community elected László Göncz. They were the sole candidates.

Following the results, Miro Cerar (the likely new Prime Minister) stated he perceives the large public support as a responsibility. He said he was open to enter coalition talks with all parties, except the SDS, which is "directly undermining the rule of legal institutions". Zvonko Černač of SDS said in his first reaction that the party considers the election result as illegitimate, since the party president was in prison for corruption after what SDS considered a politically motivated process. Karl Erjavec of DeSUS stated that the party is ready to enter the coalition talks and that they will protect the pension funds. United Left, which was positively surprised by their result, stated that they are willing to participate in a government, although they won't compromise on their political programme. Dejan Židan of the Social Democrats was disappointed with the results, saying he had expected SD to score higher. New Slovenia and ZaAB both perceived their results as a success. Franc Bogovič of the Slovenian People's Party was surprised by the fact that the party missed the required 4% of the vote, albeit only barely, and stated that he will not run for the party president at the congress.

International media noted that the winner of the election is a political newcomer and that his success is "punishment by voters for the traditional parties, tarnished by corruption scandals and years of economic turmoil". Cerar was seen as a politician untarnished by the corruption scandals. Media also noted that Cerar opposes selling controlling stakes of strategic infrastructure, such as telecoms provider Telekom Slovenia and the international airport, Aerodrom Ljubljana, and stressed that one of his main tasks will be to reduce the national budget deficit. Croatian media drew parallels between Cerar and Drnovšek, hoping that Cerar will return political culture, tolerance, and mutual respect into Slovenian politics. Jutarnji List saw the main reason for the defeat of SDS in the fact that the party has relied too much on the imprisoned party president. The Wall Street Journal stated that the most likely coalition partners would be the Social Democrats and DeSUS while Slovenian journal Finance suggested that the best coalition would be with the Social Democrats, New Slovenia, and ZaAB. A coalition government of SMC, DeSUS and the Social Democrats was formed in September.
