= Commission for the Prevention of Corruption of the Republic of Slovenia =

Slovenian anti-corruption agency

Agency overview
- Formed: 2004
- Jurisdiction: Slovenia
- Headquarters: Dunajska cesta 56, Ljubljana, Slovenia
- Agency executives: Dr. Robert Šumi, President; Simon Savski, Vice-President; David Lapornik, Vice-President
- Website: https://www.kpk-rs.si/en/

The Commission for the Prevention of Corruption of the Republic of Slovenia (acronym CPC; Slovene: "Komisija za preprečevanje korupcije Republike Slovenije", KPKRS) is an independent anti-corruption agency with a broad mandate in the field of preventing and investigating corruption, breaches of ethics and integrity of public office. The commission's activity is legally based on the 2010 Act on Integrity and prevention of corruption with later amendments. Before the commission's establishment Slovenia had an eight-year history of anti-corruption governmental bodies.

== The organization ==
=== Legal basis ===
The commission's activity is legally based on the 2010 Act on Integrity and prevention of corruption with later amendments. With the Act, its mandate, working areas, and powers were expanded to include, for example, lobbying oversight and whistleblower protection. In 2011, with the amendments to the Act the powers of the commission were further strengthened. As of 2013 they include power to subpoena financial documents of the public servants, management, and boards of public enterprises for corruption, conflict of interest, or breach of ethics.

=== Independence ===
The Commission meets the requirements for an independent body as defined by the UN Convention against Corruption since it is not subordinate to any other state institution or ministry, and does not receive direct instructions from either the executive or the legislative branches. Parliament determines its budget yearly. It does not have power of the law enforcement or prosecution system, but it has access to financial and other documents (notwithstanding the confidentiality level), and power to conduct administrative investigations. It has power to issue fines for different violations (sanctions can be appealed to the Court).

Executive team

The Act provides a special procedure for appointment and dismissal of the commission's executive team consisting of Chief Commissioner and two deputies. They are appointed by the President of the Republic of Slovenia following and open recruitment procedure and nomination by a special selection board. The Chief Commissioner's term of office is six years, the deputy's five. They can serve up to two terms in office. Prior to the expiration of the mandate, they can only be dismissed from office by the President of the Republic.

=== Working areas ===
The Commission has a wide range of competences, from the prevention of corruption and the strengthening of integrity of public office to the supervision and inspection of suspicions of alleged corrupt conduct and other irregularities. Commission’s competences are primarily defined in the Integrity and Prevention of Corruption Act, and additionally laid out in the Rules of Procedure of the Commission for the Prevention of Corruption. The structure of its competences and tasks are further defined in the Document on the Internal Organisation and Job Classification in the Commission for the Prevention of Corruption. Commission’s tasks among others, include:

- conducting administrative investigations into allegations of corruption, breaches of integrity, conflict of interest, illegal lobbying, restrictions on business activities and incompatibility of office;
- protection of whistleblowers;
- monitoring the financial status of high level public officials in the executive, legislature and judiciary through the assets declaration system;
- maintaining the central register of lobbyists;
- adopting and coordinating the implementation of the National Anti-corruption Action Plan;
- assisting public institutions in development of integrity plans (methodology to identify and limit corruption risks) and monitoring their implementation;
- designing and implementing different anti-corruption preventive measures (awareness raising, training, education, ...);
- assessment of law proposals and other legal documents in terms of corruption risks and risks of the breach of integrity;
- serving as a national focal point for international anti-corruption cooperation on systemic level (GRECO, OECD, UN, EU, ...).

=== Accountability ===
Substantive decisions of the CPC (ruling on corruption, conflict of interest, etc.) are subject to judicial review of the Administrative Courts. Under the law, the CPC must be the subject to external audit and its reports are submitted to the Parliament and the President. The CPC is also required to present yearly reports to the Parliament. In addition, by law, decisions (with few exceptions) must be published on the internet and various provisions in the law require the CPC to publicise its work and its findings.

== Major achievements ==
=== The 2011 Supervisor ===
The 2011 Supervisor web application, a result of the Transparency Project, made available to general public the data on how the public money in Slovenia is spent by local communities and governmental bodies, and their representatives, such as Mayors, which generated 1.2 million hits on the first day already.

=== The 2012–2013 Investigation Report on the Parliamentary Parties' Leaders ===
The 2012–2013 Investigation Report on the parliamentary parties' leaders revealed that Janez Janša, PM, and Zoran Janković, the head of the opposition, systematically and repeatedly violated the law by failing to properly report their assets.

==== Janez Janša ====
The 2012–2013 Investigation Report on the Parliamentary Parties' Leaders included report on:

- his purchase of one of the real-estate was indirectly co-funded by a construction firm, a major government contractor.
- his use of funds in the amount of at least 200.000 EUR, coming from unknown origin, exceeded both his income and savings.

==== Zoran Janković ====
The 2012–2013 Investigation Report on the Parliamentary Parties' Leaders included report on:

- full assets of 2.4 million EUR in total in 6 years’ time being in office not reported to the commission.
- several financial chain-transactions between the companies owned by Mr. Janković's sons and companies doing multi-million businesses with the city, part of these funds transferred to a private account of the Mayor.

==== Responses ====
By the two and their parties

Both of them had several opportunities to respond to the evidence collected and nevertheless upon being faced with the allegations and presented with the request for clarification, neither Janša nor Janković was able to present an explanation. Attempts to discredit it by Janša or spin the findings by Janković were directed to the Commission itself after the report was published. None of them addressed the citizens to explain themselves, they only sought support by parties they are leaders of. Mr. Janša made an ultimatum to other parties in power to decide until 14 January if they (sic!) want to leave the coalition.

While Positive Slovenia removed Janković from all functions within the party, SDS sent letters to the right-wing European Parliament members, who were forwarding them to their friends, estimating that the Commission itself and its allegations are part of communist campaign that begun in 1983 with the aim to remove Janša from politics.

By others

The report has been talked about in a prime-time TV show, emitted by Slovenian national broadcasting company, titled Views of Slovenia (In Slovene: "Pogledi Slovenije"). Gregor Virant's party responded to Janša's ultimatum by making their own ultimatum to Janša's party to find another party member to serve as PM. This, however, is seen as insufficient because the PM would be only a "marionette" from SDS where, despite allegations, Janša enjoys almost 100% support.
