= Aleš Čerin =

Slovenian politician (born 1949)

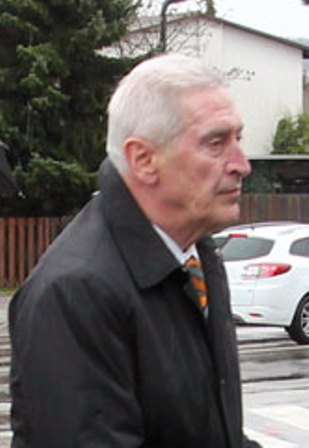
- Čerin in 2015

Acting Mayor of Ljubljana
- In office 22 December 2011 – 11 April 2012
- Preceded by: Zoran Janković
- Succeeded by: Zoran Janković

Personal details
- Born: 18 July 1949 (age 77)
- Party: Zoran Janković List
- Education: University of Ljubljana

Aleš Čerin (born 18 July 1949) is a Slovenian businessman and a politician.

== Career ==
In 1973, he graduated from law at the University of Ljubljana. He was the Secretary-General of the Government of the Republic of Slovenia from 1986 until 1992, during the Slovenian proclamation of independence in 1991. Starting in 1992, he worked in the retail company Mercator, and was made a member of its executive board from 1997 until 2005. He was elected to the city council of the Urban Municipality of Ljubljana in October 2006 as a member of the Zoran Janković List and was named by Janković a deputy mayor of the municipality.

On 22 December, he replaced Zoran Janković as the leader of the municipality, as Janković was elected to the National Assembly and retained his mayoral post until 21 December 2011. The replacement was made according to the law, but Čerin's leading position only lasted until the beginning of January 2012, when a tender for the by-election was opened. The election was held on 25 March 2012.

Čerin is also a keen bicycler and was the president of the Cycling Federation of Slovenia from 1997 until 2005.
