= Zoran Janković (politician) =

Slovenian businessman and politician (born 1953)

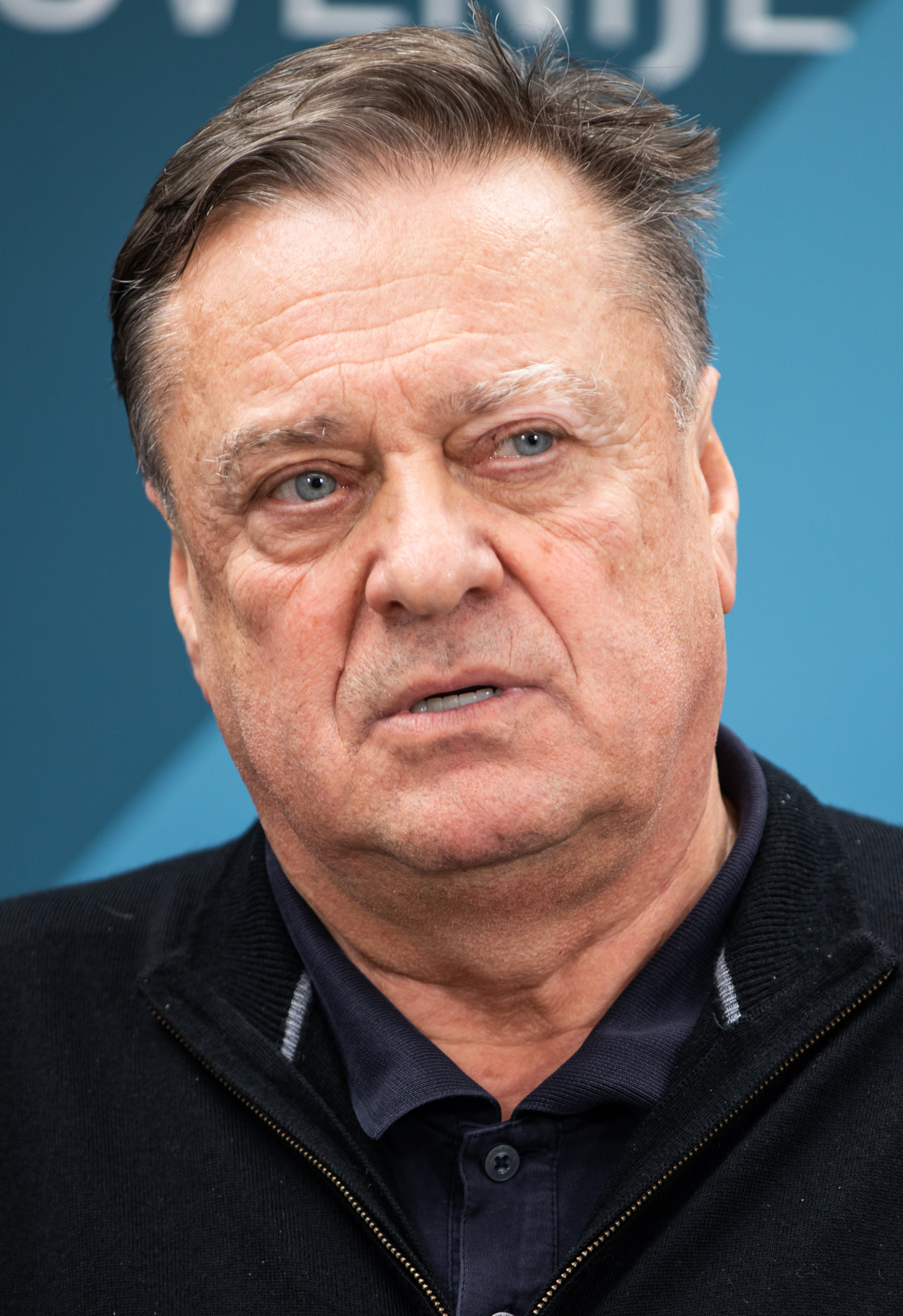
- Janković in 2023

Mayor of Ljubljana
- Incumbent
- Assumed office 11 April 2012
- Deputy: Aleš Čerin
- Preceded by: Aleš Čerin (acting)
- In office 17 November 2006 – 21 December 2011
- Deputy: Aleš Čerin
- Preceded by: Danica Simšič
- Succeeded by: Aleš Čerin (acting)

Member of the National Assembly of Slovenia
- In office 21 December 2011 – 16 April 2012
- Succeeded by: Alenka Bikar

Personal details
- Born: 1 January 1953 (age 73) Saraorci, PR Serbia, FPR Yugoslavia
- Party: Zoran Janković List (2006–2011; since 2018)
- Other political affiliations: Independent (until 2006); Positive Slovenia (2011–2018)
- Spouse: Mija Janković
- Children: 2
- Education: University of Ljubljana

Zoran Janković (born 1 January 1953) is a Slovenian businessman and politician serving as Mayor of Ljubljana since April 2012. He previously served as mayor from 2006 to 2011.

Janković came to prominence in 1997 as the president of the Slovenian retail company Mercator. In October 2011, he established the Positive Slovenia party, which won the plurality of votes at the early Slovenian 2011 parliamentary election. His function as a mayor ceased on 21 December 2011, when he became a deputy in the National Assembly. After Janković failed to be elected as the prime minister in the National Assembly, he was re-elected as the mayor of Ljubljana and retook the position on 11 April 2012. Janković is the first mayor of Ljubljana to have served two terms since the end of World War II.

== Early life ==
Janković was born in the village of Saraorci near the town of Smederevo in Serbia, then part of the Yugoslavia, to a Serb father and a Slovene mother. His parents moved to Slovenia for a better life, and left their son in poverty with his grandmother in Saraorci. In this time, his sister Jagoda was born. After finishing fourth grade of the primary school in 1964, he moved to Ljubljana so that he could learn English instead of Russian. He did not know Slovenian at the time. In Ljubljana, he attended the Valentin Vodnik Primary School in Šiška and the Kette and Murn Primary School in Kodeljevo in the last grade. Then, he attended the Poljane High School, where he learned French. There, he met his wife Mija, the cousin of Gregor Virant, who later became an influential politician. In 1971, he entered the Faculty of Economics in Ljubljana, from which he graduated in 1980 with the thesis "Agricultural Goods Wheelers-Dealers in Our Country" (Slovene: Prekupčevalci s kmetijskim blagom pri nas). During study, he built a house with the money he earned working for the AMD Moste (Auto-Moto Society Moste), with bookkeeping and with cargo transportation. In 1974, he married Mija and later had two children with her, Damijan and Jure.

== Career as manager ==
Janković started his career in 1978 in the investment sector of Post of Slovenia (which is deficient information, as at the time the postal, telephone and telegraph services were still united within PTT Slovenija with several regional PTT branches and it is not clear in which of these organizations Janković was employed). Since 1979 till 1984, he was a representative of the company Grič Zagreb, and was appointed the acting director of the tourism and trade company Mercator Investa in 1984. As the company sponsors the basketball club Smelt Olimpija, he became also the vice-president of the club. Later, he became the general director of the company. After the merge of Mercator Investa and Mercator Inženiring in 1988, he was not appointed the director of the joint company, so he left. Since 1988 till 1990, he was the vice-director of SOZD Emona and the acting director of Emona-VPS. In December 1988, he survived a severe car crash without major injuries. In 1990, as he was not appointed the director of Emona, he founded the civil engineering and interior design company Electa and remained its director till 1997. He moved to Golovec where he jogged a lot. Electa sponsored several junior sports teams. Janković became the main sponsor in 1992 and the president of the handball club Krim, later renamed to HC Krim Electa. The club made extraordinary progress and then won the national handball cup for several years. In 1995, Janković stepped down from the position of the president of the club due to his dissatisfaction with the Ljubljana city distribution of money to clubs. In 1996, he became the president of the Handball Federation of Slovenia. He retained the position till 2004.

In 1995, Janković entered the Supervisory Board of Mercator as the representative of the Slovenian Compensation Company (Slovenska odškodninska družba, SOD), which was led at the time by Tone Rop, the then Slovenian Minister of Labour and the president of the Liberal Democracy of Slovenia (LDS). According to the magazine Mladina, the main lobbyist for the entry of Janković into Mercator was Peter Rigl, who was also member of LDS.

In 1997, after the Supervisory Board of the Slovenian retail company Mercator deposed Kazimir Živko Pregelj as the chairman, due partly to the 2.5 billion tolars debt of the company, the board appointed Janković as the new director. In 2002, a recording by POP TV was published, in which Rop scolded at Janković that he himself had enabled Janković to enter Mercator. Both of them claimed later that the recording had been torn out of context, and that it had been about the entry into the supervisory board and not becoming the president of the company. According to Miran Goslar and Janković himself, the appointment was not politically motivated but made exclusively by influential managers in Mercator. Goslar stated that not even one of the then politicians supported the appointment of Janković.

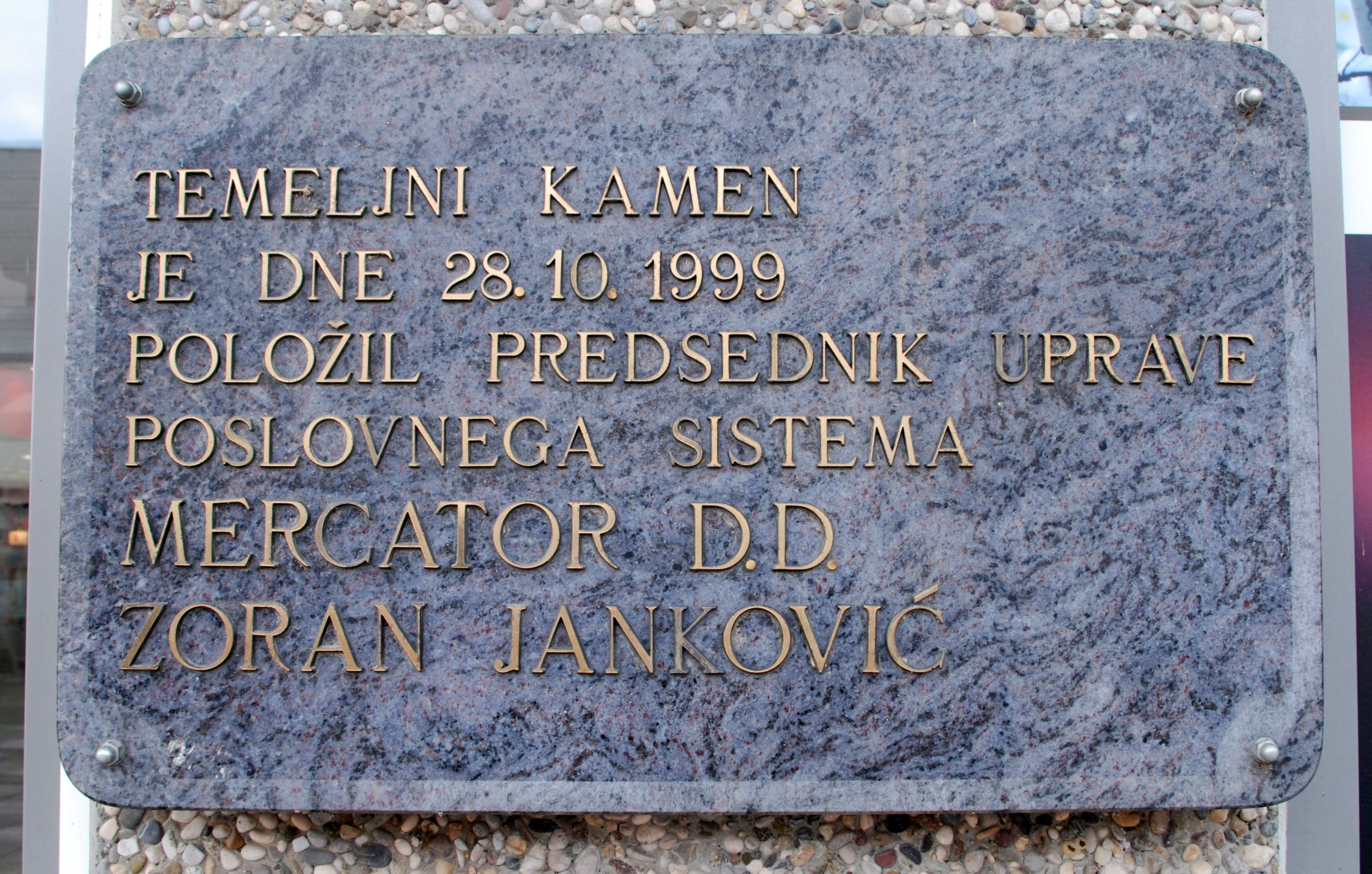
The plaque next to the entrance of the Brežice Mercator mall commemorating the laying of the foundation stone by Janković

The entry of Janković transformed the company Mercator to the biggest retail company in Slovenia and one of the biggest in the region. The company took over numerous companies, starting with Klas in 1998, and numerous others, among them the most controversial being the take-over of Emona Merkur. In August 1999, the first Mercator hypermarket was opened in Šiška. Despite being a director, Janković actively helped his employees, for example with tidying shopping carts. In December 2000, Mercator opened its shops abroad for the first time, in Pula, Croatia, and Sarajevo, Bosnia and Herzegovina, and in 2002, the largest one in Belgrade, Serbia.

In 1999, Janković became a member of the management board in the Chamber of Commerce and Industry of Slovenia (Gospodarska zbornica Slovenije, GZS), where he was appreciated as constructive and decisive. In February 2001, Janković received a prize for extraordinary economic and business achievements by GZS. In September 2001, an article is published in Delo describing Electa as being severely indebted, not paying its subcontractors, and making profit from business with Mercator. Several lawsuits were filed in but later withdrawn. Despite the accusations, Janković remained the director of Mercator and Electa fulfilled its obligations. In 2002, he was proclaimed the manager of the year by the management magazine Manager.

In 2003, Janković started his second term in Mercator. During this term, he actively opposed the act restricting the use of alcohol that prohibited the sale of alcohol to the youth and to drunk people and the sale of alcohol after 9 pm. He also opposed the closure of shops on Sundays, which was in September 2003 supported on a referendum. The magazine Kapital bestowed him with the title "The best director 2003" (Naj direktor 2003). At the end of 2003, Mercator took over Živila.

In January 2004, Slovenia hosted the 2004 European Men's Handball Championship and Janković announced his candidacy for the president of the European Handball Federation. He was a favourite at first but fell out already after the first round.

In 2005, SOD and KAD (Kapitalska družba) sold a little less than 30% of Mercator to two suppliers of Mercator, Istrabenz and Pivovarna Laško. On 15 November 2005, the new owners removed Janković from his position for non-culpable reasons and appointed Žiga Debeljak, the financial director of Gorenje. Janković later accused Prime Minister Janez Janša of having conspired to achieve his removal as part of a political deal with the new owners of Mercator.

== Mayor of Ljubljana ==
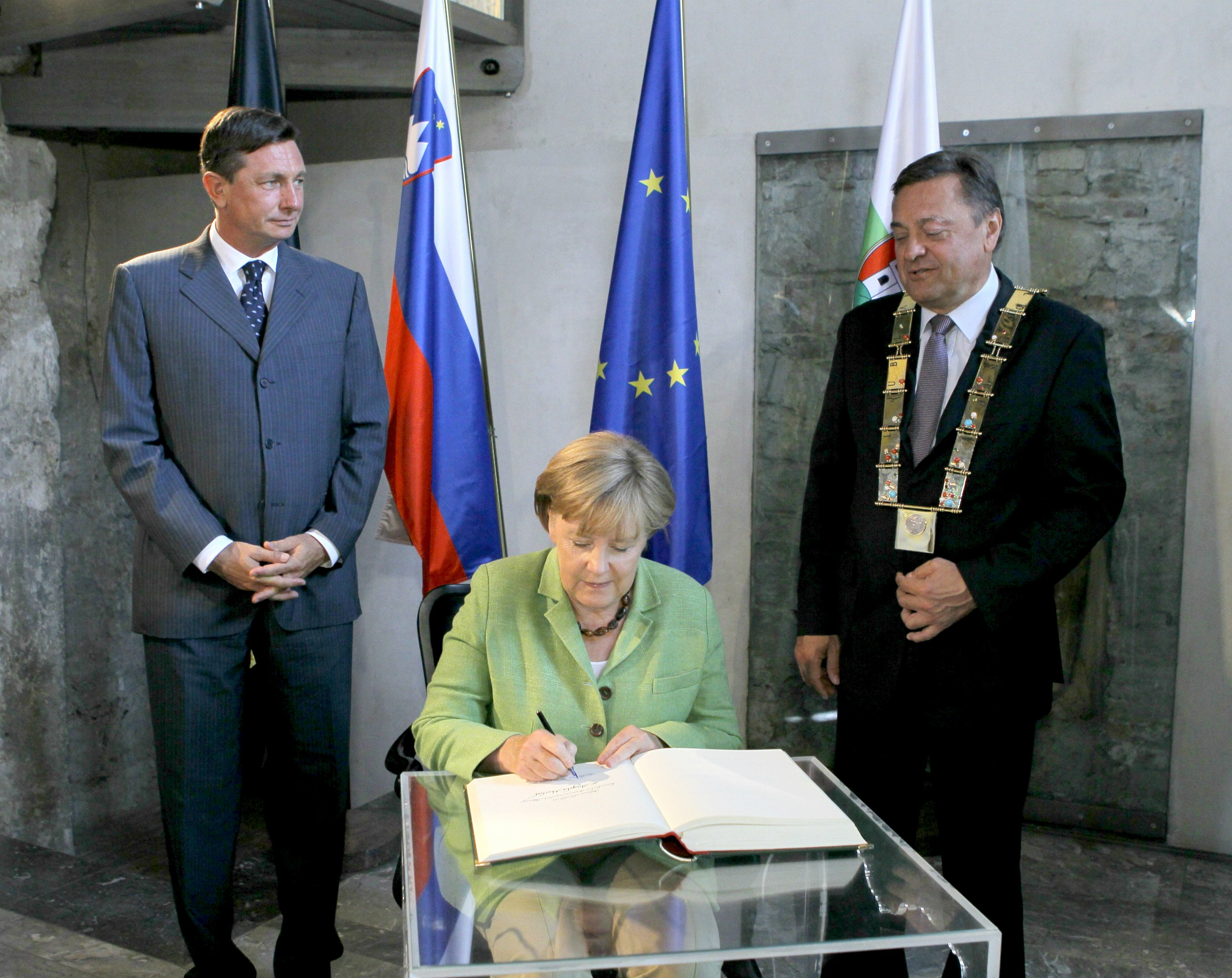
Borut Pahor, Angela Merkel and Janković in Ljubljana Town Hall, 30 August 2011

In September 2006, Janković announced his intent to run for the office of mayor of Ljubljana as an independent candidate. He was elected outright in the first round on 22 October 2006, with almost 63% of the popular vote. His list won 23 out of 45 seats in the city council, virtually guaranteeing the stability of his administration. He took the office on 17 November 2006. There were numerous campaign promises made before the elections – including the most prominent one, the building of the Stožice Stadium, a new central football stadium and indoor sports arena, which was built in 2010, solving the decades-old issue of Ljubljana not having such facilities. On 10 October 2010, Janković was re-elected for another 4-year term, receiving almost 65% of the popular vote. His list won 25 out of 45 seats in the city council. The downtown of Ljubljana has been significantly redesigned during his terms, and closed for traffic. However, the debt of the City Municipality of Ljubljana significantly increased, and many promises were not or were only partly realised.

During his term as the mayor of Ljubljana, the daily newspaper Finance accused Janković of having abused his powers as mayor of Ljubljana to create economic benefits for his sons. Janković rejected these accusations as completely false and based on the journalists' imagination. At a celebration of his father's second victory at the Ljubljana local elections, his younger son Jure Janković publicly threatened to murder the Finance journalist Jaka Elikan, who investigated and wrote about the alleged corruption of the Janković family and who was present at the event; the threat was recorded by the journalists and made public. Zoran Janković publicly reacted to the threat by rejecting any use of violence and apologizing for his son's words; at the same time, however, he accused the journalist of being excessively provocative.

Following the media allegations of Janković's abuse of power to create economic benefit for his son Jure, an Investigation Commission was formed by the Slovenian National Assembly, headed by the opposition MP Alenka Jeraj. In its final report, the Commission stated that there is a reasonable suspicion that Zoran Janković abused his power as Mayor of Ljubljana.

In an interview to the Croatian daily newspaper Večernji list in October 2010, Janković stated corruption is not an important problem in Slovenia; this statement caused some controversy in the Slovenian media, and triggered a negative public response by the Commission for the Prevention of Corruption.

== Entry into national politics ==
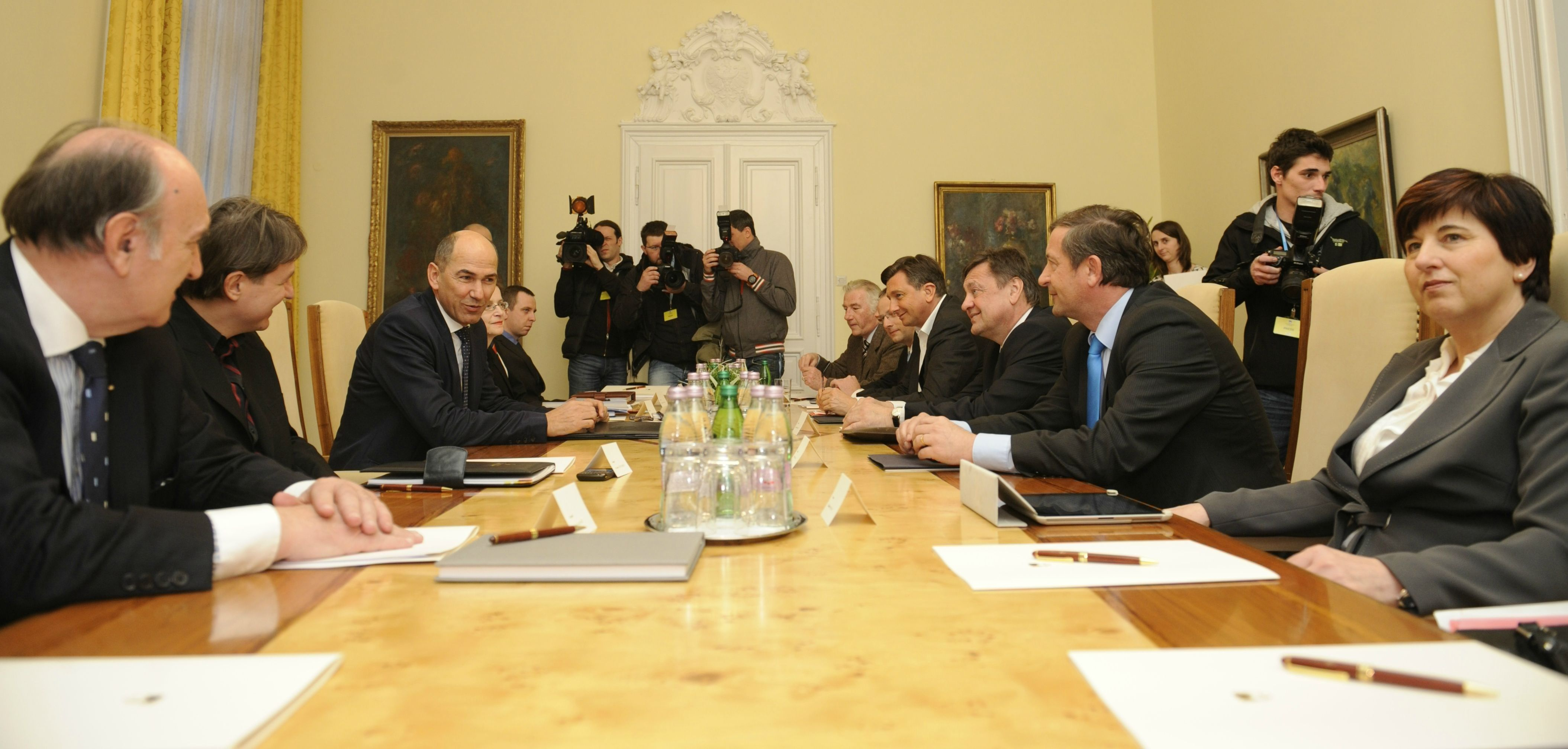
Janković in a meeting with Slovenian prime minister Janez Janša and other parliamentary leaders, 5 March 2012

On 11 October 2011, Janković announced his candidacy for prime minister with his own party, Positive Slovenia, to "make a better world for all Slovenians, beyond current political doctrines and practices". When asked what made him decide to run for the Slovenian parliamentary election, Janković replied that his final decision was made upon his wife's insistence that he should run in order to protect their children from unjust persecution. The statement was made in regard of the committee established by the Slovenian National Assembly in order to investigate Janković's alleged misuse of power as mayor of Ljubljana; his both sons were summoned to testify at the committee, both availing themselves with the right to silence. The influential investigative journalist Bojan Traven raised a theory, according to which Janković's entry into state politics was conditioned by the concern over the financial status of his family.

On 4 December, Positive Slovenia won the election with 28.51% of votes, thus gaining 28 seats out of 90 in the Assembly. In his first responses, Janković said that the victory of his party was a proof that Slovenians wanted an efficient state and that he would focus on economic growth. Shortly after the unofficial results became available, he stated he would invite all the parties to coalition talks. Analysts predicted the most likely coalition would consist of Positive Slovenia (PS), Social Democrats (SD), Gregor Virant's Civic List (LGV) and Democratic Party of Pensioners of Slovenia (DeSUS).

On 5 January 2012, President Danilo Türk proposed Janković as the candidate to form a government to the National Assembly. Two days before the scheduled voting, the Slovenian Association of Journalists and Commentators, the second largest journalists' association in the country, issued a statement raising the concern that Janković might abuse his power as prime minister by curtailing the freedom of media through intimidation. A coalition agreement between PS, SD, LGV and DeSUS was initialled on 7 January. However, in the evening of 9 January, LGV announced it would not support Janković as the new prime minister and also not join his coalition, due to large differences in the programs of the parties.

On 11 January, Janković was not elected as the new prime minister by the National Assembly. In a secret ballot, his candidacy only gained the support of 42 deputies, two less than expected prior to the voting, and four short of the absolute majority needed for his election. Following the election of Janez Janša as the prime minister in the second round of the voting, Positive Slovenia became an opposition party.

When Janković got elected to the National Assembly, his function as the Mayor of Ljubljana ceased because of incompatibility of the two functions. In February, Janković announced he decided to run for the position of Mayor of Ljubljana again. He participated at the by-election for the mayor of Ljubljana on 25 March 2012 and was elected for the continuation of the second term with 61% of votes. He retook the leadership of the city council on 11 April 2012. His mandate of a deputy ceased on 16 April 2012. On 19 April, he was replaced by the former athlete Alenka Bikar.

On 17 January 2013, Alenka Bratušek replaced Janković as president of the Positive Slovenia party after Janković temporarily renounced all functions in the party following allegations raised by the official Commission for the Prevention of Corruption report.

On 26 April 2014, Zoran Janković was again voted as the president of the party with 422 votes for out of 763 voters; his only opponent, Alenka Bratušek, received 338 votes.

On 29 April 2014, Bratušek resigned from Positive Slovenia, and also announced her resignation as Prime Minister, to take effect on 5 May 2014. She became the first Slovenian Prime Minister to resign from office; her resignation went into effect on 8 May, and then on 31 May 201,4 she formed her own party Alliance of Alenka Bratušek (Zavezništvo Alenke Bratušek; ZaAB).

== Public perception ==
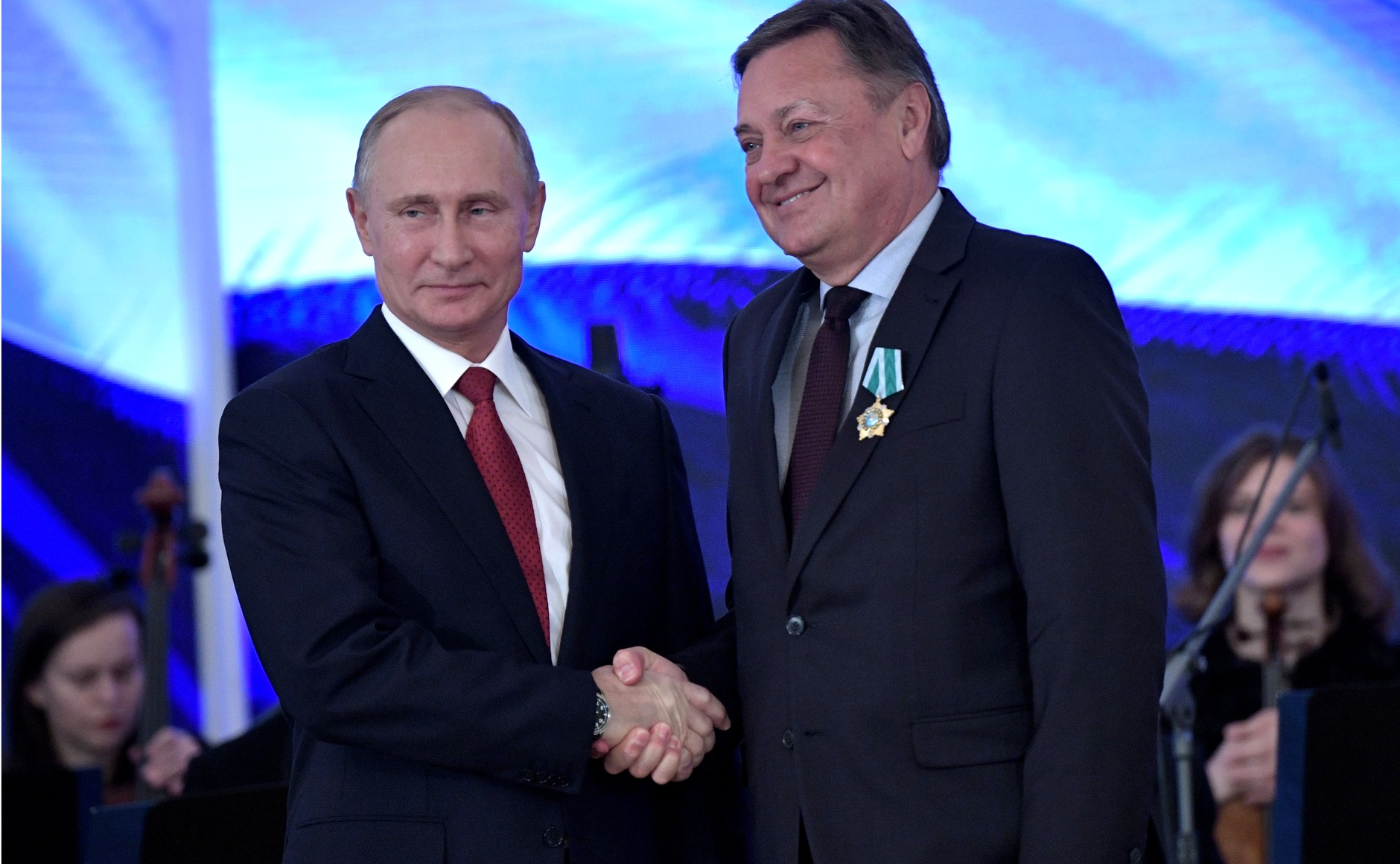
Janković with Russian president Vladimir Putin, 4 November 2017

Throughout his presence in the public life, Janković has been mired in scandals. This is alleged by his detractors and acknowledged by his sympathisers. The latter say that while every politician is corrupt, at least Janković is "a man of action" and has finally done something for residents of Ljubljana. This normally refers to him having built the Stožice stadium. His opponents point out, however, that he built it with taxpayers' money and that his family and companies owned by them have benefited to the tune of many millions from backhanders paid by building contractors engaged to construct it, while subcontractors were not paid for their work, supposedly for lack of funds.

In 1998, the left liberal magazine Mladina accused Janković of having used his influence as businessman in order to secure his younger son's participation in the spring matura state exams, although he should have first passed two retake exams. In October 2011, a whole episode of the talk political show Pogledi Slovenije, aired by the national broadcaster RTV Slovenija, was focused on Janković's alleged nepotism.

He has been a target of satire, especially by the popular comedian Denis Avdić. In May 2012, it was revealed that the Slovene tax administration was investigating how 400 thousand out of the 15 million euros, paid by the City of Ljubljana to the Stožice Sports Park construction contractor (GREP), ended on the account of the KLM Naložbe company, which is majority-owned by Zoran Janković.

Janković and his son Jure were also under investigation by the tax authorities and the police in connection with the Cypriot company Blue Train of which Jure Janković had been revealed to be a director.

He is perennially cited as one of the most influential people in the country.

Political offices
Preceded by Danica Simšič	Mayor of Ljubljana; 2006–2011	Succeeded by Aleš Čerin; Acting
Preceded by Aleš Čerin; Acting	Mayor of Ljubljana; 2012–present	Incumbent
