= Ljubo Germič =

Slovenian politician

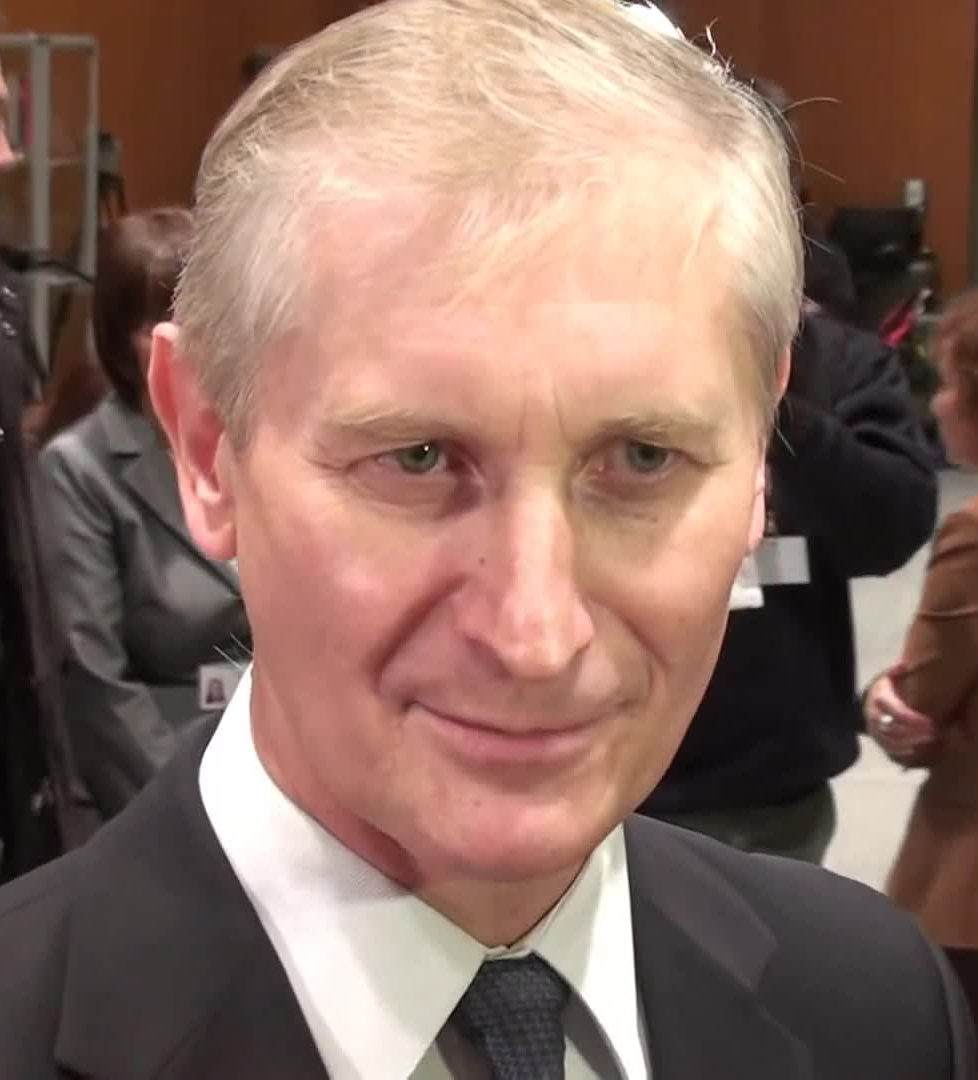

Slovenian parliamentary election
- In office 2008–2011

Personal details
- Born: 19 November 1960 (age 65) Ruše, Slovenija
- Party: Liberal Democracy of Slovenia - LDS
- Profession: Chemical Engineer

Ljubo Germič (born 19 November 1960) is a Slovenian politician and a former member of the Slovenian National Assembly. After the resignation of Pavel Gantar, Germič was elected the Speaker of the National Assembly on 2 September 2011, and succeeded on 21 December 2011 by Gregor Virant.

== Work experience ==
After having graduated from the Technical Faculty of the University of Maribor, Department of Chemical Engineering in 1984, he started working as chemical technologist at the Ruše nitrogen factory. In 1987, he joined the staff of the Technical Faculty as a teaching and research assistant, continuing his postgraduate training at the University of Twente, the Netherlands (1992–1994). In 1994, he began teaching at the Secondary School of Ruše where he was appointed headmaster in 1997. He held the position until 2000 when he was elected deputy of the National Assembly of the Republic of Slovenia. In the parliamentary term 2000 - 2004, he was a member of the Committee on Health, Labour, the Family, Social Affairs and the Disabled (Deputy Chair between 2003 and 2004); a member of the Committee on Culture, Education, Youth, Science and Sport, as well as a member of the Committee on Finance and Monetary Policy, and Chair of the Committee on EU Affairs (2004). He was also a member of the Executive Committee of the GLOBE Slovenia Parliamentary Group and the President of the Parliamentary friendship group with Finland. In 2003 - 2004, he was nominated Observer to the European Parliament and later Member of the European Parliament. In 2004, he was re-elected deputy of the National Assembly and chairs the Committee on Health. He is also a member of the Executive Committee of the GLOBE Slovenia Parliamentary Group. Since 1998, he has been a member of the Ruše Municipal Council.

== Working bodies ==
- Committee on Health (Chair)
- Committee on Culture, Education, Sport and Youth (Member)
- Committee on Labour, the Family, Social Policy and Disability (Deputy Chair)
- Committee on Higher Education, Science and Technological Development (Member)

== Delegations ==
- Delegacija Državnega zbora v Parliamentarni skupščini Sveta Evrope (Alternate member)

== Parliamentary friendship groups ==
- Friendship group with Australia (member)
- Friendship group with Finland (chair)
- Friendship group with Canada (member)
- Friendship group with China (member)

Political offices
Preceded by Pavel Gantar	Speaker of the National Assembly of Slovenia; 2011	Succeeded by Gregor Virant
