= Saraorci =

- Village (Selo)
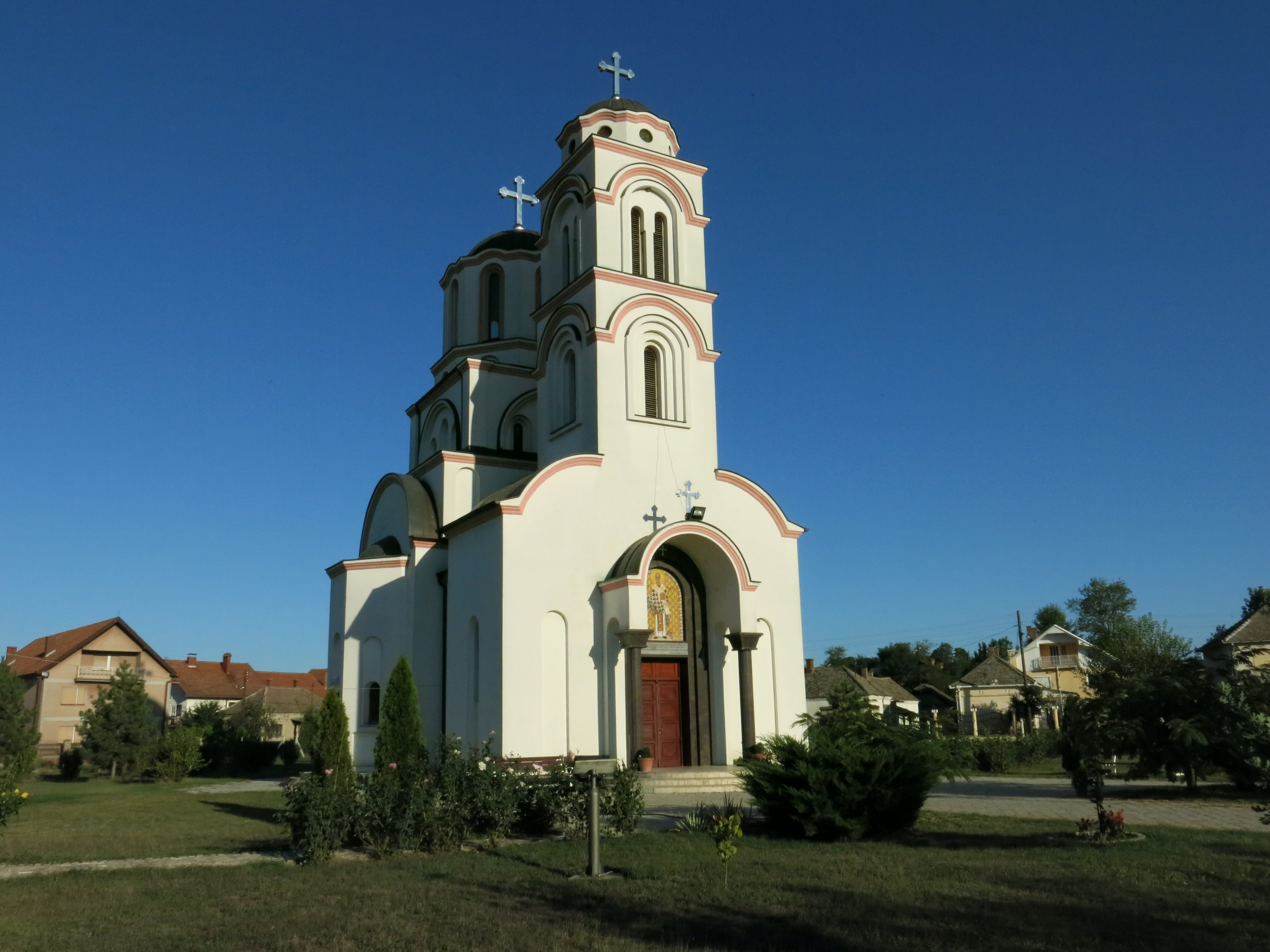

- Location within Serbia
- Coordinates: 44°29′N 21°04′E
- Country: Serbia
- District: Podunavlje District
- Municipality: Smederevo

Population (2022)
  - Total: 1,704
- Time zone: UTC+1 (CET)
  - Summer (DST): UTC+2 (CEST)

Saraorci is a village in the municipality of Smederevo, Serbia. According to the 2002 census, the village has a population of 2413 people, mostly of Serb ethnicity. The manager and politician Zoran Janković, who has been continuously serving as the mayor of Slovenian capital Ljubljana since 2012, was born in Saraorci.
