= Gregor Virant =

Slovenian politician and public servant

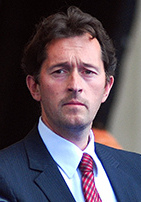

Minister of the Interior
- In office 20 March 2013 – 18 September 2014
- Preceded by: Vinko Gorenak
- Succeeded by: Vesna Györkös Žnidar

Speaker of the National Assembly of Slovenia
- In office 21 December 2011 – 28 January 2013
- Preceded by: Ljubo Germič
- Succeeded by: Jakob Presečnik (acting)

Personal details
- Born: 4 December 1969 (age 56) Ljubljana, Slovenia
- Party: Independent (2014–present); Civic List (2011–2014); SDS (2004–2011)
- Education: University of Ljubljana
- Profession: Lawyer, public servant, politician

Gregor Virant (born 4 December 1969) is a Slovenian politician and public servant. Between 2004 and 2008, he served as Minister of Public Administration in Janez Janša's first government, between 2011–2013 he was Speaker of the National Assembly of Slovenia. He also served as Minister of the Interior and Public Administration in the government of Alenka Bratušek between 2013 and 2014.

He was the leader (October 2011 – May 2014) of the Civic List, until April 2012 named Gregor Virant's Civic List, a liberal political party established in October 2011 to compete in the 2011 parliamentary election.

Since September 2019 he serves as head of Programme SIGMA, the joint initiative of the OECD and the European Union to provide support for improvement in governance and management to UE candidates and other countries in the area of influence.

== Life ==
Virant was born in Ljubljana. He studied law at the University of Ljubljana and at Glasgow Caledonian University. Between 1995 and 1999, he worked as a legal adviser to the Constitutional Court of Slovenia. He resides in Domžale.

== Public servant career ==
In 2000, he was appointed secretary-general at the Ministry of Interior (led by Peter Jambrek) in the short lived centre-right government of Andrej Bajuk. He also remained in office during the centre-left governments of Janez Drnovšek and Anton Rop. During that period, he was one of the authors of the reform of public administration, introducing professionalism in public servant posts.

== Political career ==
Virant resigned from office shortly before the 2004 parliamentary elections, in which he ran as a candidate for the Slovenian National Assembly on the list of the Slovenian Democratic Party. However, he never joined the party.

After the electoral victory of the Slovenian Democratic Party in 2004, Virant became the head of the newly created Ministry of Public Administration in the first government led by Janez Janša. He launched a thorough reform of the public service in Slovenia, which included modernization and economizing of the service. In the last years of Janša's government, Virant frequently ranked as the most popular minister and one of the most popular politicians in Slovenia.

After the 2008 parliamentary elections, in which the Slovenian Democratic Party lost to the left-wing coalition headed by the Social Democrat leader Borut Pahor, Virant was replaced as minister by Irma Pavlinič Krebs of the Zares party.

In December 2008, Virant was elected chairman of the Rally for the Republic (Slovene: Zbor za republiko), a civic platform founded in 2004 to promote classical liberal, patriotic, republican, and liberal-conservative values in Slovenian public life. Between 2009 and 2011, he was also member of the Council of Experts of the Slovenian Democratic Party, the main opposition party's shadow government.

In October 2011, he announced he would run for parliament in the 2011 parliamentary election on an independent ticket. According to an opinion poll released soon after the announcement, Virant was seen as the most appropriate choice for prime minister by the plurality of voters. On 21 October, the Gregor Virant's Civic List was officially chartered as a political party.

On 4 December, Virant was elected to the Slovenian National Assembly as the leader of the Gregor Virant's Civic List. On 21 December, with the votes of his list, the Slovenian Democratic Party, the Slovenian People's Party, New Slovenia and the Democratic Party of Pensioners of Slovenia, he became the Speaker of the Assembly, thus defeating the candidate of Positive Slovenia party, Maša Kociper. He succeeded Ljubo Germič. On 24 April, he was reelected as the leader of the party.

After his party received only 1.2% of votes in European Parliament election, he resigned as party leader.

== Family life ==
Virant is married and has two children. He is the son-in-law of the politician Miha Brejc. His cousin, Mija Janković, is married to Zoran Janković, the mayor of Ljubljana and leader of the now dissolved Positive Slovenia party.

Political offices
New title	Minister for Public Administration; November 2004 – November 2008	Succeeded by Irma Pavlinič Krebs
Preceded by Ljubo Germič	Speaker of the National Assembly of Slovenia; 2011 – 2013	Succeeded by Janko Veber
