= 2011 Slovenian parliamentary election =

← 2008	4 December 2011	2014 →

All 90 seats in the National Assembly 46 seats needed for a majority
- Turnout: 65.60% (▲2.50 pp)
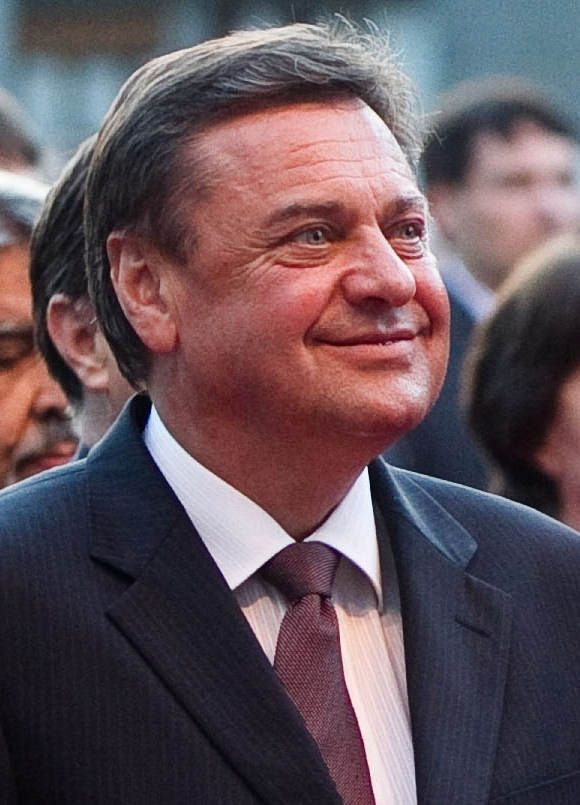

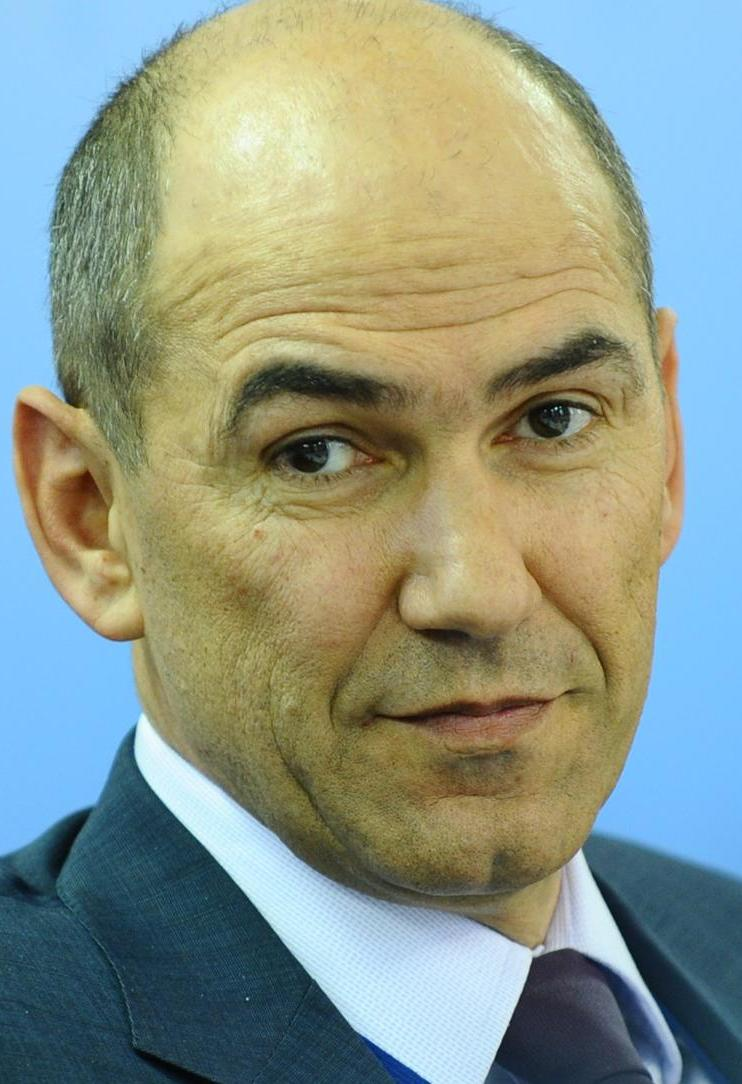

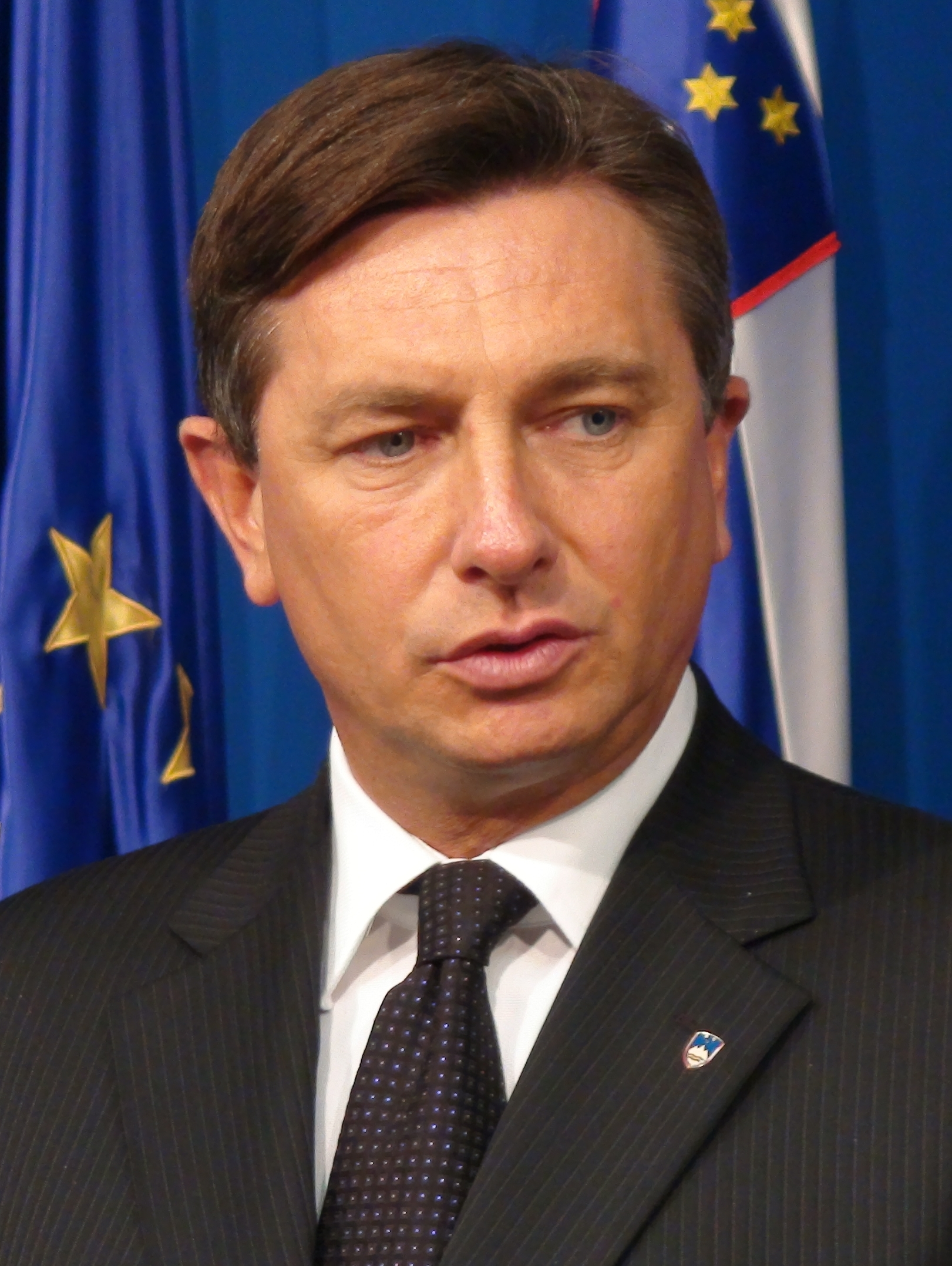

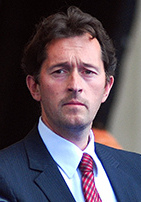

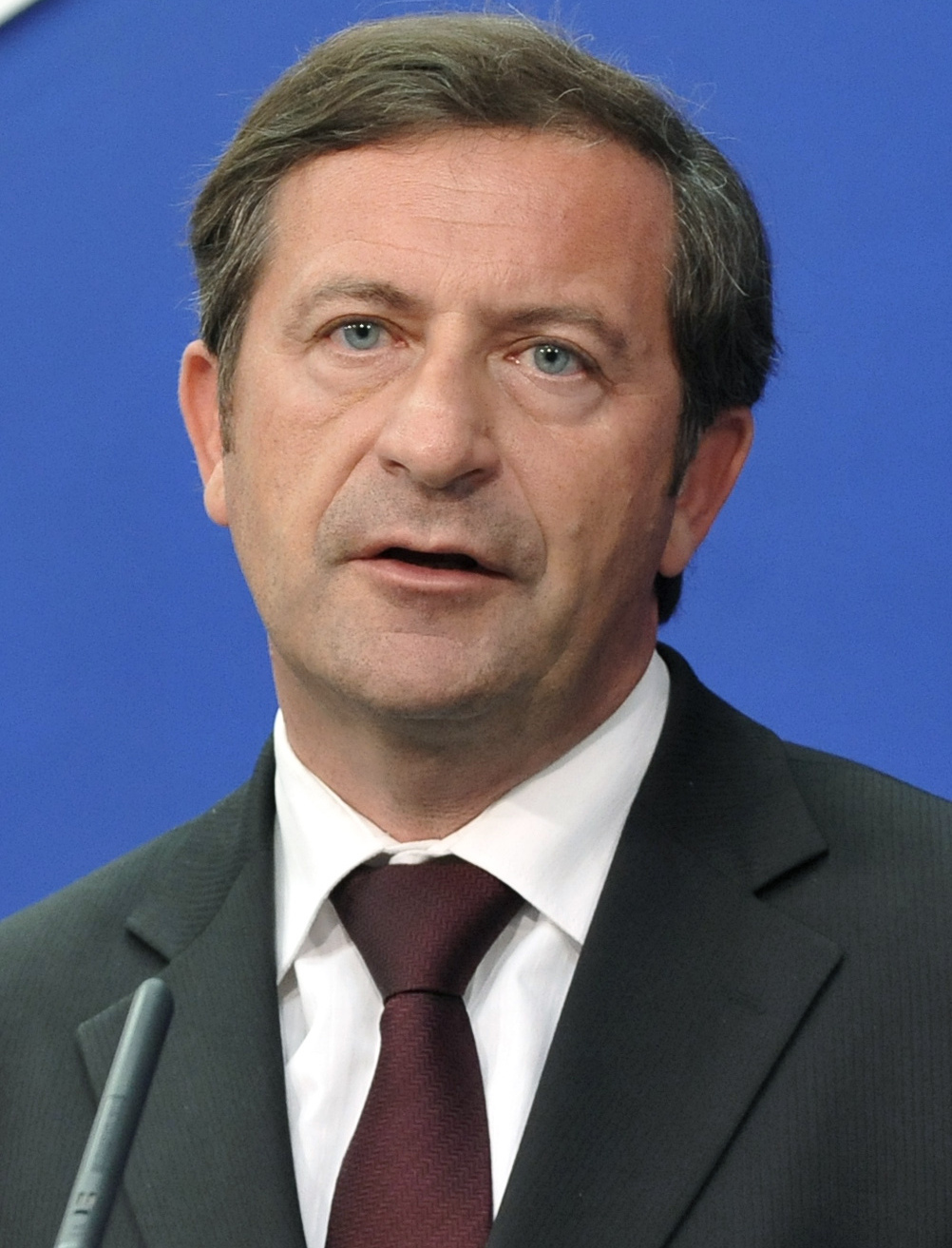

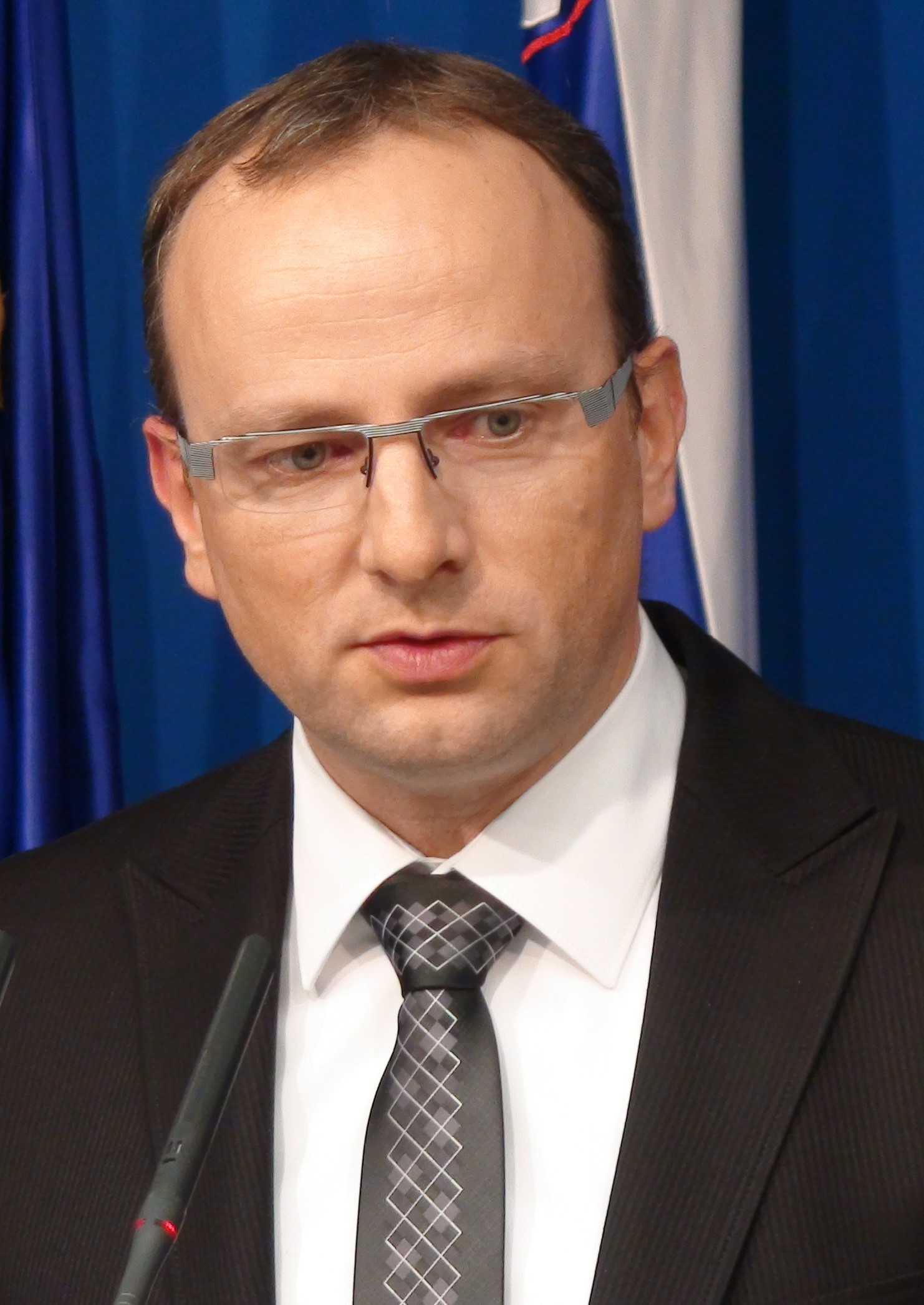

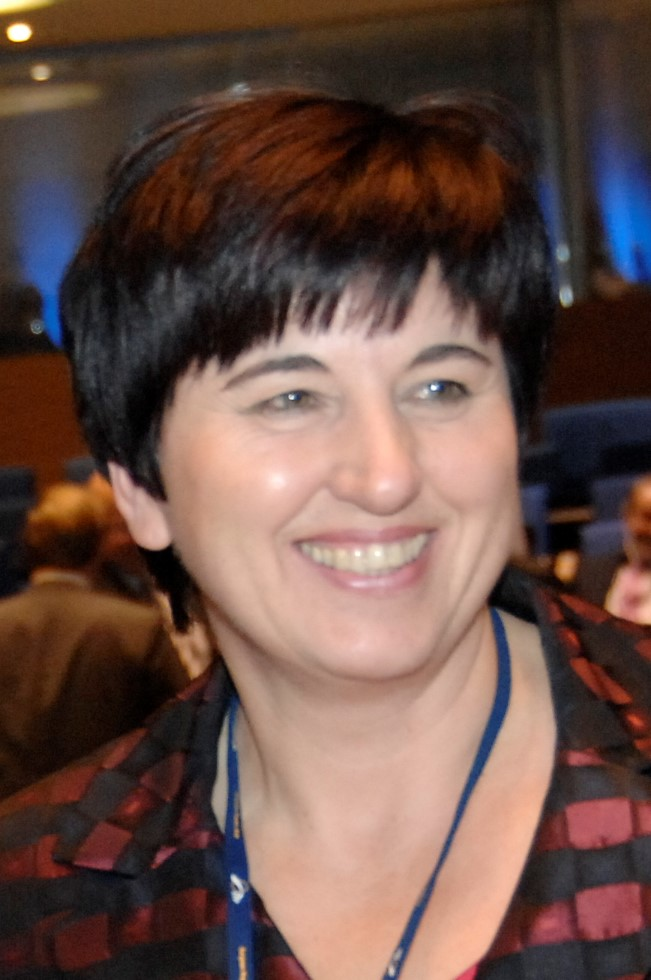
	First party	Second party	Third party
Leader	Zoran Janković	Janez Janša	Borut Pahor
Party	PS	SDS	SD
Last election	New	28 seats, 29.3%	29 seats, 30.5%
Seats won	28	26	10
Seat change	New	▼2	▼19
Popular vote	314,273	288,719	115,952
Percentage	28.51%	26.19%	10.52%
	Fourth party	Fifth party	Sixth party
Leader	Gregor Virant	Karl Erjavec	Radovan Žerjav
Party	Gregor Virant's Civic List	DeSUS	SLS
Last election	New	7 seats, 7.45%	5 seats, 5.21%
Seats won	8	6	6
Seat change	New	▼1	▲1
Popular vote	92,282	76,853	75,311
Percentage	8.37%	6.97%	6.83%
	Seventh party
Leader	Ljudmila Novak
Party	NSi
Last election	0 seats, 3.40%
Seats won	4
Seat change	▲4
Popular vote	53,758
Percentage	4.88%
Prime Minister before election
Borut Pahor
SD
Prime Minister after election
Janez Janša
SDS

Parliamentary elections were held in Slovenia on 4 December 2011 to elect the 90 deputies of the National Assembly. This was the first early election in Slovenia's history. The election was surprisingly won by the center-left Positive Slovenia party, led by Zoran Janković. However, he failed to be elected as the new prime minister in the National Assembly, and the new government was instead formed by a right-leaning coalition of five parties, led by Janez Janša, the president of the second-placed Slovenian Democratic Party. The voter turnout was 65.60%.

== Background ==
The National Assembly consists of 90 members, elected for a four-year term, 88 members elected by the party-list proportional representation system with D'Hondt method and 2 members elected by ethnic minorities (Italians and Hungarians) using the Borda count.

The election was previously scheduled to take place in 2012, four years after the 2008 election. However, on 20 September 2011, the government led by Borut Pahor fell after a vote of no confidence.

As stated in the Constitution, the National Assembly has to elect a new prime minister within 30 days and a candidate has to be proposed by either members of the Assembly or the President of the country within seven days after the fall of a government. If this does not happen, the president dissolves the Assembly and calls for a snap election. The leaders of most parliamentary political parties expressed opinion that they preferred an early election instead of forming a new government.

As no candidates were proposed by the deadline, the President Danilo Türk announced that he would dissolve the Assembly on 21 October and that the election would take place on 4 December. The question arose as to whether the President could dissolve the Assembly after the seven days, in the event that no candidate was proposed. However, since this situation is not covered in the constitution, the decision of the President to wait the full 30 days was welcomed by the political parties. The dissolution of the Assembly, a first in independent Slovenia, took place on October 21, a minute after midnight.

== Opinion polls ==
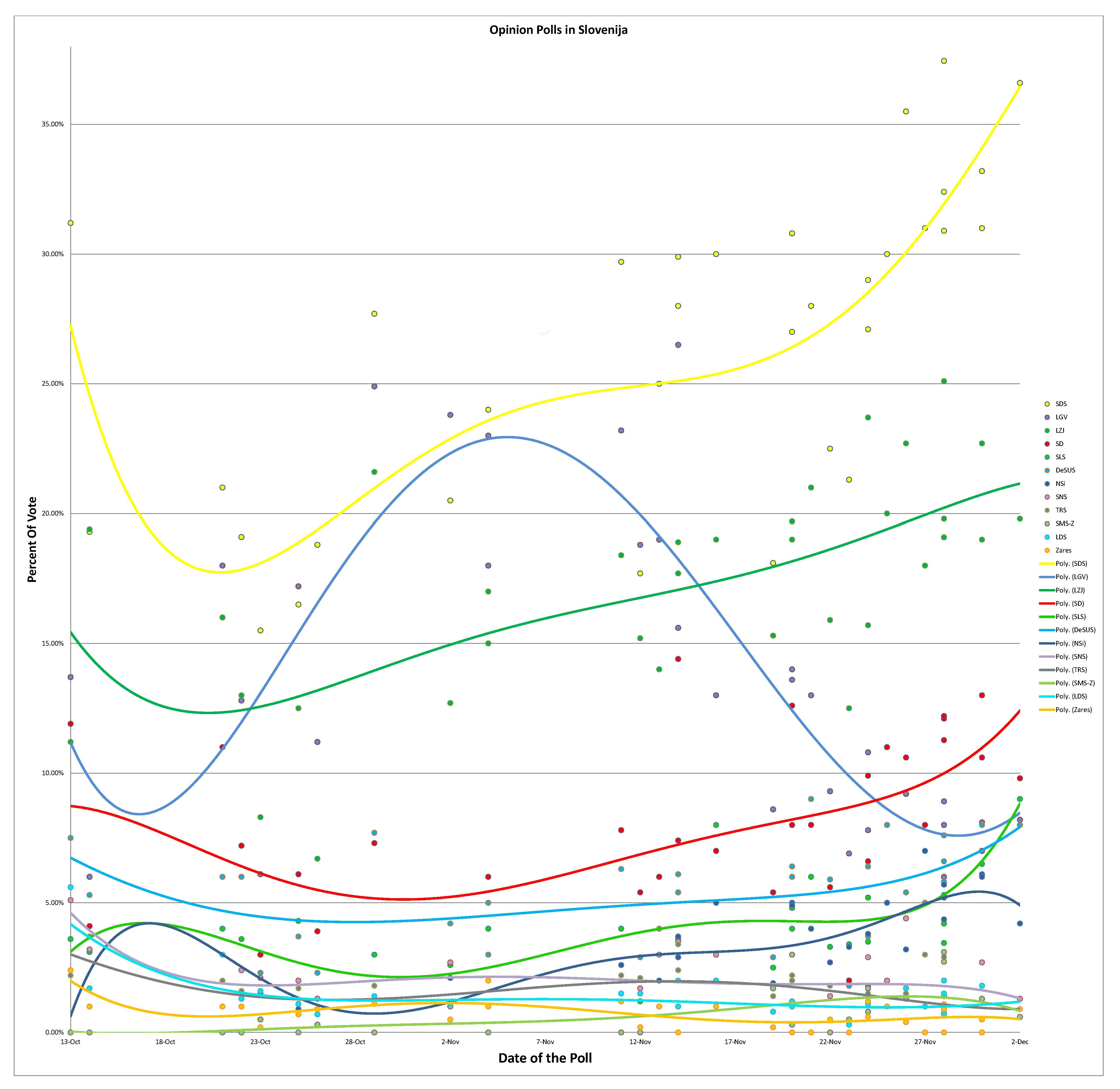

Source	Date	SDS	LZJ	LGV	SD	DeSUS	SLS	NSi	SNS	TRS	SMS-Z	LDS	Zares	GzS	Avion	Other	Don't Know	Won't Vote	Won't Answer
Last election	2008	29.3%	-	-	30.5%	7.5%	5.2%	3.4%	5.4%	-	-	5.2%	9.4%	-	-	4.05%	-	36.9%	-
IFIMES	October 13	31.2%	11.2%	13.7%	11.9%	7.5%	3.6%	-	5.1%	2.2%	-	5.6%	2.4%	-	2.8%	2.8%	-	-	-
Delo	October 14	19.3%	19.4%	6.0%	4.1%	5.3%	3.1%	3.2%	3.2%	3.7%	-	1.7%	1.0%	0.4%	-	0.2%	20.5%	8.9%	-
Finance	October 21	21%	16%	18%	11%	6%	4%	3%	2%	2%	-	3%	1%	-	-	3%	6%	5%	-
Ninamedia	October 22	19.1%	13.0%	12.8%	7.2%	6.0%	3.6%	2.4%	2.4%	1.6%	-	1.3%	1.0%	-	-	0.5%	20.5%	8.3%	-
FUDŠ	October 23	15.5% (37)	8.3% (15)	6.1% (12)	3.0% (7)	2.3% (5)	1.6% (4)	1.5% (4)	2.1% (4)	0.2%	0.5%	1.6%	0.2%	0.1%	-	1.4%	52.3%	3.3%	-
Mediana	October 25	16.5%	12.5%	17.2%	6.1%	3.7%	4.3%	0.9%	2.0%	1.7%	-	1.1%	0.7%	-	0.8%	4.4%	15.3%	8.9%	4.0%
Večer	October 26	18.8%	6.7%	11.2%	3.9%	2.3%	1.3%	1.3%	1.3%	0.9%	0.3%	0.7%	0.9%	-	-	7.2%	32.3%	9.4%	1.4%
Ninamedia	October 29	27.7%	21.6%	24.9%	7.3%	7.7%	3.0%	1.8%	1.1%	1.8%	-	1.4%	1.1%	-	-	0.6%	-	-	-
FUDŠ	November 2	20.5%	12.7%	23.8%	2.6%	4.2%	2.6%	2.1%	2.7%	1.1%	1.0%	1.1%	0.5%	0.2%	-	0.6%	24.1%	0.3%	-
Episcenter	November 4	24%	17%	23%	6%	5%	4%	1%	2%	2%	<1%	1%	2%	-	-	1%	11%	-	3%
CRJM	November 4	18%	15%	18%	4%	3%	1%	1%	2%	1%	-	1%	1%	-	-	0%	(34%)	(34%)	(34%)
Ninamedia	November 11	29.7%	18.4%	23.2%	7.8%	6.3%	4%	2.6%	2.2%	2.2%	-	1.5%	1.2%	-	-	0.9%	-	-	-
Delo	November 12	17.7%	15.2%	18.8%	5.4%	2.9%	1.2%	2.1%	1.7%	2.1%	-	1.5%	0.2%	0.1%	-	1.2%	20.4%	6.3%	-
Mediana	November 13	25%	14%	19%	6%	4%	4%	2%	1%	1%	3%	1%	1%	-	-	(16%)	(16%)	(16%)	(16%)
Ninamedia	November 14	29.9%	18.9%	15.6%	14.4%	5.4%	3.6%	3.7%	3.5%	2.4%	-	1%	-	-	-	-	-	-	-
Parsifal SC	November 14	28%	17.7%	26.5%	7.4%	6.1%	3.6%	2.9%	2.4%	3.4%	-	2%	-	-	-	-	-	-	-
Episcenter	November 16	30%	19%	13%	7%	5%	8%	5%	3%	2%	2%	2%	1%	-	-	-	-	-	-
Delo	November 19	18.1%	15.3%	8.6%	5.4%	2.9%	2.5%	1.9%	1.8%	1.4%	1.7%	0.8%	0.2%	0.4%	-	(2.3%)	31.1%	6.5%	(2.3%)
Mediana	November 20	27%	19%	14%	8%	6%	4%	5%	1%	2%	3%	1%	0%	-	-	2%	(9%)	-	(9%)
Ninamedia	November 20	30.8%	19.7%	13.6%	12.6%	6.4%	4.8%	4.9%	2.2%	2.2%	0.3%	1.2%	1.1%	-	-	-	-	-	-
Valicon	November 21	28%	21%	13%	8%	9%	6%	4%	-	-	-	-	-	-	-	-	-	-	-
CRJM	November 22	22.5%	15.9%	9.3%	5.6%	5.9%	3.3%	2.7%	1.4%	1.8%	-	0.5%	0.5%	-	-	0.5%	(30.2%)	(30.2%)	(30.2%)
Večer	November 23	21.3%	12.5%	6.9%	2.0%	1.8%	3.4%	3.3%	0%	0.3%	0.5%	0.3%	-	-	-	(13.7%)	25.9%	(13.7%)	2%
Interstat	November 24	27.1%	15.7%	7.8%	6.6%	3.7%	3.5%	1.8%	1.7%	1.2%	0.8%	0.6%	0.6%	-	-	0.1%	16.2%	11.1%	1.3%
Ninamedia	November 24	29.0%	23.7%	10.8%	9.9%	6.4%	5.2%	3.8%	2.9%	1.5%	1.7%	1.1%	1.2%	-	-	-	-	-	-
Episcenter	November 25	30%	20%	11%	11%	8%	8%	5%	2%	1%	1%	1%	1%	-	-	-	-	-	-
Delo	November 26	35.5%	22.7%	9.2%	10.6%	5.4%	3.2%	3.2%	4.4%	1.5%	1.3%	1.7%	0.4%	0.1%	-	-	-	-	-
Mediana	November 27	31%	18%	8%	8%	5%	5%	7%	3%	3%	1%	1%	0%	-	-	1%	(8%)	-	(8%)
FUDŠ	November 28	37.45% (38)	19.09% (19)	8.91% (9)	11.27% (11)	5.82% (6)	3.45%	4.36% (5)	0.73%	2.91%	2.73%	2.00%	1.09%	0.18%	-	-	-	-	-
Mladina	November 28	32.4%	25.1%	6.0%	12.1%	6.6%	5.3%	5.2%	1.5%	1.5%	1.4%	1.5%	-	0.2%	-	-	-	-	-
Radio Ognjišče	November 28	30.9%	19.8%	8.0%	12.2%	7.6%	4.2%	5.7%	2.0%	-	3.1%	0.7%	0.9%	-	-	-	21.3%	-	-
FUDŠ	November 30	33.2%	22.7%	8.1%	10.6%	6.0%	6.5%	6.1%	2.7%	0.5%	1.3%	1.8%	0.5%	0.1%	-	-	-	-	-
Valicon	November 30	31%	19%	7%	13%	8%	8%	6%	-	-	-	-	-	-	-	-	-	-	-
FUDŠ	December 2	36.6%	19.8%	8.2%	9.8%	8.0%	9.0%	4.2%	1.3%	0.9%	0.6%	0.9%	0.9%	0.1%	-	-	-	-	-
Mediana	December 2	28.5%	24.6%	8.1%	14.3%	5.8%	7.4%	3.7%	2.5%	2.5%	0.1%	1.6%	0.2%	-	-	-	-	-	-

== Results ==
Two new parties, both formed just weeks before the election, entered the National Assembly, with Positive Slovenia winning the election and Gregor Virant's Civic List placing fourth. The Slovenian National Party (SNS) and two liberal parties, Liberal Democracy of Slovenia (LDS) and Zares, all won less than a margin of 4% of the vote, consequently losing their position in the National Assembly. However, the Christian democracy centre-right New Slovenia party returned to the Assembly after being absent following the 2008 election.

Party	Votes	%	Seats	+/–
Zoran Janković's List – Positive Slovenia	314,273	28.51	28	New
Slovenian Democratic Party	288,719	26.19	26	–2
Social Democrats	115,952	10.52	10	–19
Gregor Virant's Civic List	92,282	8.37	8	New
Democratic Party of Pensioners of Slovenia	76,853	6.97	6	–1
Slovenian People's Party	75,311	6.83	6	–
New Slovenia – Christian People's Party	53,758	4.88	4	+4
Slovenian National Party	19,786	1.80	0	–5
Liberal Democracy of Slovenia	16,268	1.48	0	–5
Party for Sustainable Development of Slovenia	13,477	1.22	0	New
Youth Party – European Greens	9,532	0.86	0	–
Zares – Social Liberals	7,218	0.65	0	–9
Democratic Labour Party	7,118	0.65	0	New
Greens of Slovenia	4,000	0.36	0	0
Movement for Slovenia	3,339	0.30	0	New
Party of Equal Opportunities	1,787	0.16	0	New
Forward Slovenia	1,100	0.10	0	0
Party of Slovenian People	976	0.09	0	0
Party of Humane Slovenia	295	0.03	0	New
Acacias	212	0.02	0	0
Hungarian and Italian national communities			2	0
Total	1,102,256	100.00	90	0
Valid votes	1,102,256	98.29		
Invalid/blank votes	19,219	1.71		
Total votes	1,121,475	100.00		
Registered voters/turnout	1,709,692	65.60		
Source: DVK

In accordance with the Constitution of Slovenia, two seats were allocated to the Italian and Hungarian national communities, one to a representative of each community. Members of the Italian community elected Roberto Battelli, and members of the Hungarian community elected László Göncz as their representative. Batelli was the sole candidate of the Italian community, whereas in the Hungarian community, Göncz won 68.54% of votes and Orban Dušan won 31.46% of votes. In the Italian community, 1,152 (42.49%) out of 2,711 voters voted, and in the Hungarian community, 3,382 (50.77%) out of 6,661 voters voted.

== Responses ==
Immediately after the election, Janković said that the victory of his party was proof that Slovenians wanted more efficiency in the government and that he would focus on economic growth. Shortly after the unofficial results became available, he stated he would invite all the parties to coalition talks. Analysts predicted the most likely coalition would consist of PS, SD, LGV and DeSUS.

The leader of the SDS party, Janez Janša, congratulated Janković on the day of the election, stating that he was ready to cooperate, though Janković previously rejected a potential coalition with SDS. The leader of the Social Democrats and incumbent Prime Minister Pahor stated that the result of his party was better than he expected following the fall of his government earlier in September. The LGV, DeSUS, SLS, and NSi parties also stated their satisfaction with the results. Foreign media reported about the win of the election by Zoran Janković as a surprising result and as a heavy blow to Janez Janša in the context of public surveys that predicted an easy win for Janša.

Danilo Türk, the President of Slovenia, pointed out after the election that the will of the voters had been clearly expressed, that it had been a rational choice and that it proved them to be ready for changes. He also stated that the large participation at election showed the voters had preserved their trust in democracy. He congratulated the parties who succeeded to win a seat in the Assembly and summoned them to work for the common good.

== Analysis ==
According to public opinion researchers, Positive Slovenia won the election due to the mobilisation of left-wing voters, particularly in Ljubljana. They also reported that tactical voting in Slovenia reached proportions that were not recorded anywhere else before, with 30% of Slovenian voters voting tactically. Meanwhile, three percent of right-wing voters abstained from voting.

The election also saw a record number of female deputies elected, accounting for 29 (32%) of 90 elected deputies. In addition, 57 deputies who never before held the post of deputy were elected. The average age of the elected deputies was just under 51 years, and the youngest deputy was 26 years old while the oldest deputy was 68 years old.

== Aftermath ==
Official results of the election were announced on 16 December. The first and the founding session of the newly elected Assembly took place on 21 December. Then, the elected deputies confirmed their mandates and the mandate of previously elected deputies ceased.

Due to the amendment to the Deputies Act, passed in May 2011, this was the first election enforcing the incompatibility of the mayoral post and the post of deputy at the National Assembly. 11 mayors were elected, including Zoran Janković, the Mayor of Ljubljana. All of them lost their mayoral posts on 21 December 2011, when they became deputies. In Destrnik and Mirna Peč, also a city councillor has to be replaced, because the former mayor held that post too. The by-election in Mirna Peč will take place in June, whereas as of April 2012 the date of the by-election in Destrnik has not been decided yet. Mayoral by-elections was held in March 2012.

On 5 January 2012, Zoran Janković was chosen by the President Danilo Türk to be proposed to the National Assembly as Prime Minister-designate. A draft agreement between the negotiating teams of PS, SD, LGV and DeSUS was initiated on 7 January 2012. However, it failed to gain support in the LGV, and in the evening of 9 January, the LGV announced it would not support Janković as the new prime minister in the secret confirmation vote and also not join his coalition, due to large differences in the programs of the parties, particularly emphasising the Positive Slovenia's lack of concept. On 11 January, the deputies did not elect Janković as the new prime minister in the secret vote. His candidacy gained only 42 of the necessary 46 votes. Türk characterised Janković's victory as unusually high and expressed his support of Janković as the new prime minister. He expressed his disappointment with Janković not being backed by deputies.

In the second round, according to the rules of procedure, the National Assembly had 14 days to nominate him or another candidate for the Prime Minister, with the candidate of the President of Slovenia having precedence. Türk was mentioning the banker Marko Voljč as a possible candidate, but did not propose him to the National Assembly due to lack of support. Till 25 January, he decided not to propose anyone as a candidate in the second round, despite the second-placed Janša having the support of the parties NSi, SLS, DeSUS and LGV, and his party (SDS) having signed a coalition agreement with them. He cited lack of Janša's legitimacy as a reason for not supporting him, as Janša had been charged with involvement in the Patria bribery case, unlike Janković, who had not been formally charged with anything. No party had officially proposed Janša as a candidate to the President. Türk stressed again that Janković would be a good candidate, and added that the election showed lack of trust of voters in Janša.

Apart from the President, the deputy groups and ad hoc groups of at least ten deputies may propose candidates for the PM to the National Assembly in the second round. On 25 January, the broad coalition of SDS, SLS, Desus and LGV proposed Janša. He became the Prime-Minister elect on 28 January. His cabinet, the tenth government in the history of independent Slovenia, was confirmed on 10 February, and Janša became the new prime minister with a handover from Pahor on the same day. On 13 February, the President received the new Government and wished them luck. Both parties agreed that good cooperation is crucial for success.

In February 2012, Janković announced he decided to run for the position of Mayor of Ljubljana again. He participated at the by-election for the mayor of Ljubljana on 25 March 2012 and was elected for the continuation of the second term with 61% of votes. He retook the leadership of the city council on 11 April 2012. His mandate of a deputy ceased on 16 April 2012. On 19 April, he was replaced as a deputy of Positive Slovenia by the former athlete Alenka Bikar.

On 1 June 2014, President Borut Pahor announced the dissolution of the Assembly on 2 June and that the election would take place on 13 July.
