= Positive Slovenia =

Slovenian political party

Positive Slovenia Pozitivna Slovenija
- Leader: Zoran Janković
- Founder: Zoran Janković
- Founded: 22 October 2011
- Dissolved: 2024
- Split from: Zares and Liberal Democracy of Slovenia
- Preceded by: Zoran Janković List
- Succeeded by: Zoran Janković List
- Headquarters: Ljubljana
- Ideology: Social liberalism Social democracy
- Political position: Centre to centre-left
- European affiliation: Alliance of Liberals and Democrats for Europe Party (2014)

Website
- http://pozitivnaslovenija.si/

The logo of Positive Slovenia, which was in use from the establishment of party on 22 October 2011 until its second congress on 21 January 2012, included the name of Zoran Jankovič, its president. Originally, the party was known as Zoran Janković's List – Positive Slovenia.

Positive Slovenia (Slovene: Pozitivna Slovenija, PS) was a centre-left political party in Slovenia, following April 2014 led by founder Zoran Janković. The party was founded under the name Zoran Janković's List – Positive Slovenia. It was renamed to Positive Slovenia in its second congress, held on 21 January 2012.

== History ==
On 11 October 2011, Janković, then mayor of Ljubljana, announced that he would participate in the early parliamentary election, following the fall of the government of Prime Minister Borut Pahor. The charter of the new party was enacted on 22 October 2011, where Janković was unanimously elected president. Among the party's supporters were National Assembly members Matjaž Zanoškar, Cveta Zalokar Oražem, and Renata Brunskole. Milan Kučan, the first President of Slovenia, also expressed his support, citing Janković's work as the chairman of the retailing chain, Mercator, and as the mayor of Ljubljana.

Among the goals of the party that Janković emphasised were a secure, social and efficient state with a 4% GDP growth rate and less than 3% budget deficit. Janković stated that his goal was to place Slovenia among the most successful countries in the world.

Positive Slovenia won 28.51% of the vote, thus gaining 28 parliamentary seats at the early Slovenian 2011 parliamentary election: the most of all participating political parties. Janković was favourite to become prime minister, and Positive Slovenia led coalition negotiations, primarily with the Social Democrats (SD), Gregor Virant's Civic List (LGV), and DeSUS. A preliminary coalition agreement was reached, but LGV withdrew two days later and endorsed a Slovenian Democratic Party-led centre-right government, leaving Positive Slovenia in opposition.

In relation to the 2013 allegations made by the official Commission for the Prevention of Corruption of the Republic of Slovenia, the party temporarily suspended Janković from all functions. Alenka Bratušek became its chair-woman. PS submitted an initiative to dismiss Janša's cabinet, that passed. Bratušek became the first female prime minister of Slovenia, and Positive Slovenia became the principal governmental party.

On 30 January 2014, PS applied for membership of the Alliance of Liberals and Democrats for Europe (ALDE), but resigned from its pending membership on 30 April 2014 after the following party congress.

On 26 April 2014, Zoran Janković was again voted as the president of the party with 422 votes for out of 763 voters. His election also caused a split in PS' parliamentary group: 11 deputies formed their own group, while 2 became unaffiliated; 13 deputies ultimately stayed with PS. On 31 May Bratušek's splinter group formed the Alliance of Alenka Bratušek as a separate party.

In the 2014 European election, PS received a mere 6.6% of the vote, failing to return any MEPs.

The party received 2.96% of the vote in the 2014 parliamentary election on 13 July 2014, and did not win any seats in parliament.

The party did not contest the 2018 parliamentary election, or participate in any subsequent elections. It was officially dissolved in 2024.

== Reception ==
Janković's decision to create a new political party came together with the announcements of other new parties, such as Gregor Virant's Civic List and the Party for Sustainable Development. The new party gained significant public support even before it was officially chartered, placing first in an opinion poll by the newspaper Delo. Other opinion polls placed the party among the top three.

The leaders of the centre-left parties whom Janković supported in the 2008 election, had reservations about Janković entering state politics. On the other hand, Janez Janša, the opposition leader, claimed that Janković did not bring an alternative to the politics of Slovenia.

In 2011, Slovenian Democratic Party affiliated mayors in eastern Slovenia threatened to split off the regions of Lower Styria and Prekmurje from the central state, claiming that a future government under Janković would pursue a rigorously Ljubljana-centred policy and ignore the interests of the peripheric regions.

== Leaders ==
- Zoran Janković, 2011–2013
- Alenka Bratušek, 2013–2014
- Zoran Janković, 2014–2018

== Electoral results ==
=== Parliament ===
Election	Leader	Votes	%	Seats	+/–	Position	Government
2011	Zoran Janković	314,273	28.5	28 / 90	▲28	1st	Opposition (2012–2013)
2011	Zoran Janković	314,273	28.5	28 / 90	▲28	1st	Coalition (2013–2014)
2014	Zoran Janković	25,975	2.97	0 / 90	▼28	▼9th	Extraparliamentary

=== Presidential ===
Election	Candidate	1st round		2nd round		Elected?
Election	Candidate	votes	% of vote	votes	% of vote	Elected?
2012	Danilo Türk^{[a]}	293,429	35.88	231,971	32.63	Lost

^{a} Independent candidate, support
