= Zoran Janković List =

Slovenian political list

The Zoran Janković List (Slovene: Lista Zorana Jankovića) is a Slovenian non-party list, formed in 2006 by the mayor of Ljubljana, Zoran Janković. On 23 October 2006, Janković was elected mayor of Ljubljana, and his list won 52,619 votes resulting in 41.4% of the total vote. There were 23 out of 45 people elected in the City Council. At the election on 10 October 2010, Janković's list won 25 out of 45 seats in the City Council. Zoran Janković lost his mayoral post in December 2011, after he became a deputy in the Slovenian National Assembly.

== Members of the City Council of Ljubljana from the list ==
In 2010, the following members of the list were elected to the City Council of Ljubljana:

- Bojan Albreht
- Bruna Antauer
- Milena Mileva Blažić
- Marko Bokal
- Marta Bon
- Nives Cesar
- Aleš Čerin - deputy mayor, in pro tempore performance of the tasks of the Mayor
- Jadranka Dakić
- Tjaša Ficko - deputy mayor
- Miro Gorenšek
- Roman Jakič
- Maša Kociper
- Iztok Kordiš
- Marija Dunja Piškur Kosmač
- Janez Koželj - deputy mayor
- Eva Strmljan Kreslin
- Mitja Meršol
- Jani Möderndorfer
- Mojca Kavtičnik - Ocvirk
- Sašo Rink
- Gregor Tomc
- Peter Vilfan
- Marjan Jernej Virant
- Jelka Žeker
- Julijana Žibert
