= Civic List (Slovenia) =

Slovenian political party

Civic List Državljanska lista
- Leader: Bojan Starman
- Founded: 21 October 2011
- Dissolved: 2024
- Ideology: Classical liberalism
- Political position: Centre to centre-right
- European affiliation: Alliance of Liberals and Democrats for Europe

Website
- http://www.d-l.si

The Civic List (Slovene: Državljanska lista, DL) was a classical-liberal extra-parliamentary political party in Slovenia, led by Gregor Virant. LGV won 8.37% of the vote at the early 2011 Slovenian parliamentary election on 4 December 2011, thus gaining 8 seats in the National Assembly. After a quit of its deputy group by one of its deputies in April 2012, it has had 7 seats. Until April 2012 the party was named Gregor Virant's Civic List (Državljanska lista Gregorja Viranta, LGV).

== History ==
Virant, former Minister of Public Administration in Janez Janša's government between 2004–2008 and chairman of the civil platform Rally for the Republic (Slovene: Zbor za republiko) announced on 10 October 2011, that he would form a list to participate in the early parliamentary election, following the fall of the government of Borut Pahor.

The party was officially chartered on 21 October 2011 in Ljubljana. Among the supporters of the party is the entrepreneur and owner of Pipistrel company Ivo Boscarol, who stated he will not join the party but will help as an expert counsellor, and the economist and Liberal activist Rado Pezdir. The public intellectual Peter Jambrek and jurist Tone Jerovšek, both former members of the Constitutional Court of Slovenia and prominent members of the Rally for the Republic, also voiced their support for Virant's political project.

When the party was formed, some of the prominent members were economist Janez Šušteršič, former director of the Slovenian governmental Institute of Macroeconomic Analysis and Development between 2001 and 2007, former chairman of the Office for the Protection of Competition Jani Soršak, former Minister of Transport and former vice-president of the National Assembly Marko Pavliha (who had been a member of the Liberal Democracy of Slovenia between 2004 and 2007). In January 2012, Pavliha left the party. In the beginning of April, the deputy Ivan Vogrin left the deputy group of the party in the National Assembly after the party reproached him for the debts created by his private company. He has remained member of the party, though.

Virant's decision to create a new political party came together with announcements of other new parties, such as the centre-left Positive Slovenia and the Party for Sustainable Development. The responses to the creation of the new party were mixed. The Slovenian Democratic Party, with which Virant cooperated closely in the past, though without ever being a member, called his action "unfair and treacherous". Responses from other parties were more reserved, with the Social Democrats considering the new parties as serious competitors while Zares, Democratic Party of Pensioners of Slovenia, and Slovenian National Party welcomed the new political programs, offering a more diverse choice at the election.

The new party gained significant public support even before it was officially chartered, placing among the top three in an opinion poll by the newspaper Delo and three other organizations. According to an opinion poll released soon after the announcement of the new party, Virant was seen as the most appropriate choice for prime minister by the plurality of voters.

In the first weeks, of the electoral campaign, the party polled very high results, placing it among the top three, together with the Slovenian Democratic Party and Positive Slovenia. During the course of the electoral campaign, however, the support of the party fell dramatically. The fall of support was correlated with the scandal over Gregor Virant's high unemployment benefits in the year after his term as Minister of Public Administration expired. The party also came under heavy attack of the conservative media, considered close to the Slovenian Democratic Party (especially the weekly magazines Reporter and Demokracija). On the other hand, it was also criticized by some left-liberal columnists, especially in regards to its neoliberal economics programme and its ambiguous positions on issues such as LGBT rights.

In the 2011 election, the party gained 8.37% of the vote, far behind its initial polls, and was placed fourth, after Positive Slovenia, the Slovenian Democratic Party and the Social Democrats.

On 24 April 2012, the party renamed itself and reelected Gregor Virant as its president. It also reelected Janez Šušteršič and elected Aleksandra Markovič Predan as its vice-presidents.

The party became a member of the Alliance of Liberals and Democrats for Europe (ALDE) on 9 November 2012.

In 2012, the party supported the bailout of banks that came close to bankruptcy during the financial crisis. The bank bailout law was introduced by a party member, finance minister Janez Šušteršič.

After party received only 1.2% of votes in 2014 European Parliament election, Virant resigned as party president. He was temporarily replaced by vice-president Saša Markovič.

On 9 June 2014 Bojan Starman was elected as the new president of the party.

The party received 0.63% of the vote in the Slovenian parliamentary election on 13 July 2014, and did not win any seats in parliament.

Their website was last active in May 2019. The party officially dissolved in 2024.
