= Vinje, Dol pri Ljubljani =

Vinje
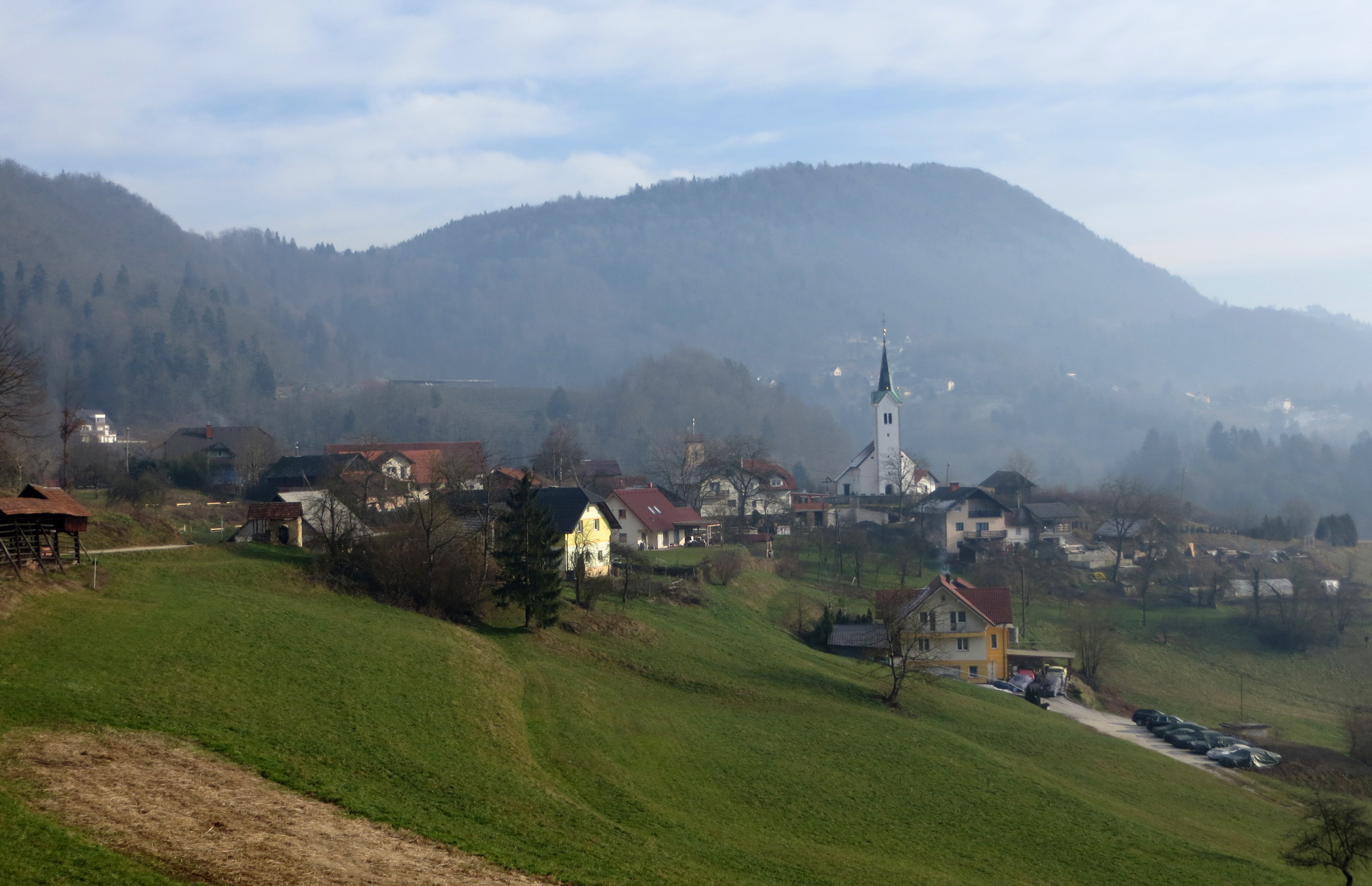

- Location in Slovenia
- Coordinates: 46°6′57″N 14°40′11″E
- Country: Slovenia
- Traditional region: Upper Carniola
- Statistical region: Central Slovenia
- Municipality: Dol pri Ljubljani

Area
  - Total: 3.16 km^{2} (1.22 sq mi)
- Elevation: 361.8 m (1,187 ft)

Population (2020)
  - Total: 494
  - Density: 156/km^{2} (405/sq mi)

Vinje (pronounced [ˈʋiːnjɛ]; German: Weinthal) is a dispersed settlement north of Dolsko in the Municipality of Dol pri Ljubljani in the southeastern part of the Upper Carniola region of Slovenia.

== Name ==
Vinje was attested in historical sources as Weintal in 1439 and Weyntal in 1446. The Slovenian name is probably based on the plural demonym *Vin'ane, referring to residents of a wine-producing area.

== Church ==
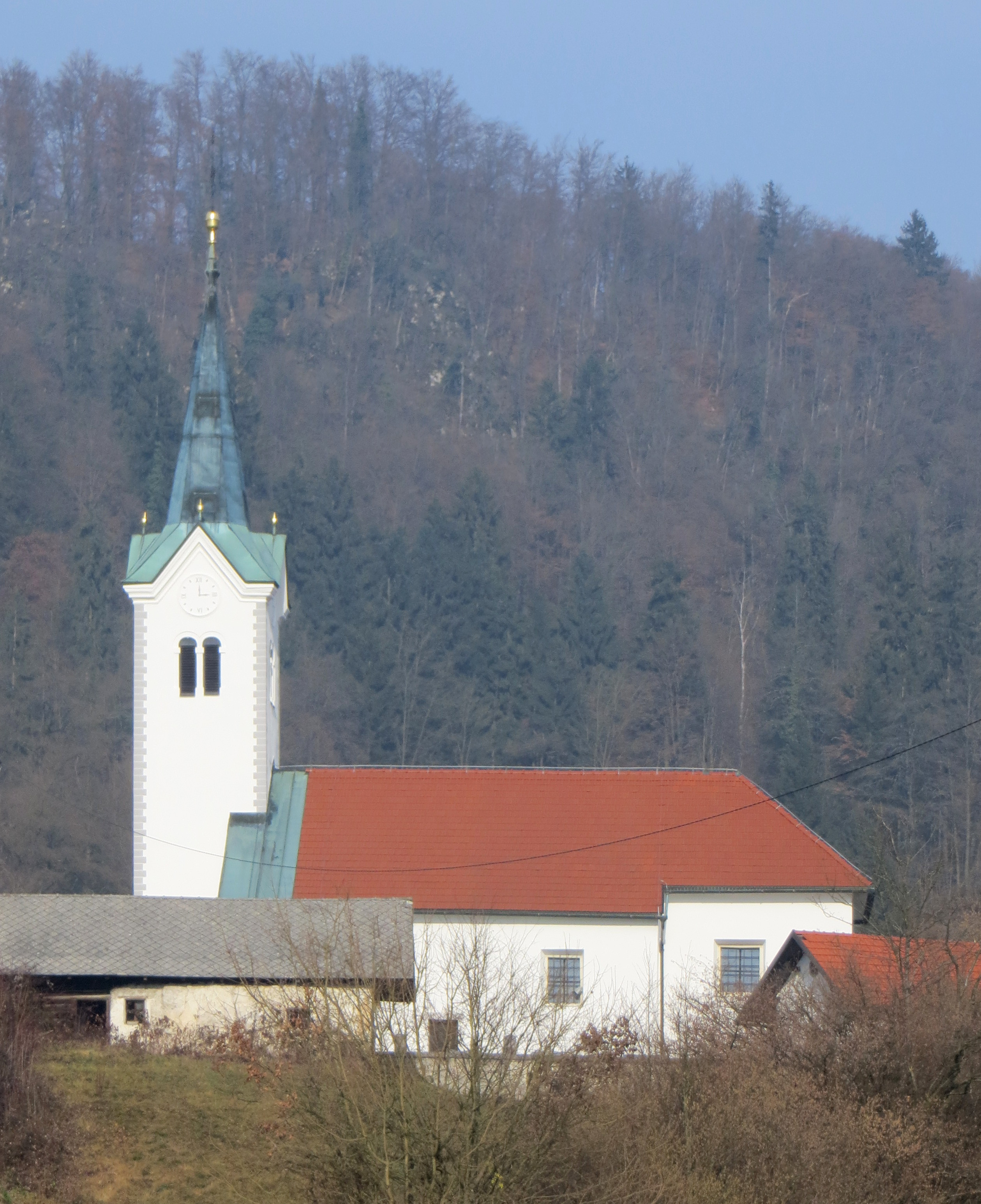
Assumption Church

The church in Vinje is dedicated to the Assumption of Mary. It is a chapel of ease and belongs to the parish of Saint Helena in Kamnica. The church is originally a medieval structure mentioned in written records in 1526, and it was reworked in the 18th and 19th centuries. It is surrounded by a walled cemetery. The church has a rectangular nave and chancel with a barrel-vaulted ceiling. The bell tower stands to the west; it has an arched entrance.

== Notable people ==
- Katarina Zupančič, (1860–1918), Slovenian straw plaiter and folk singer
