= Osredke =

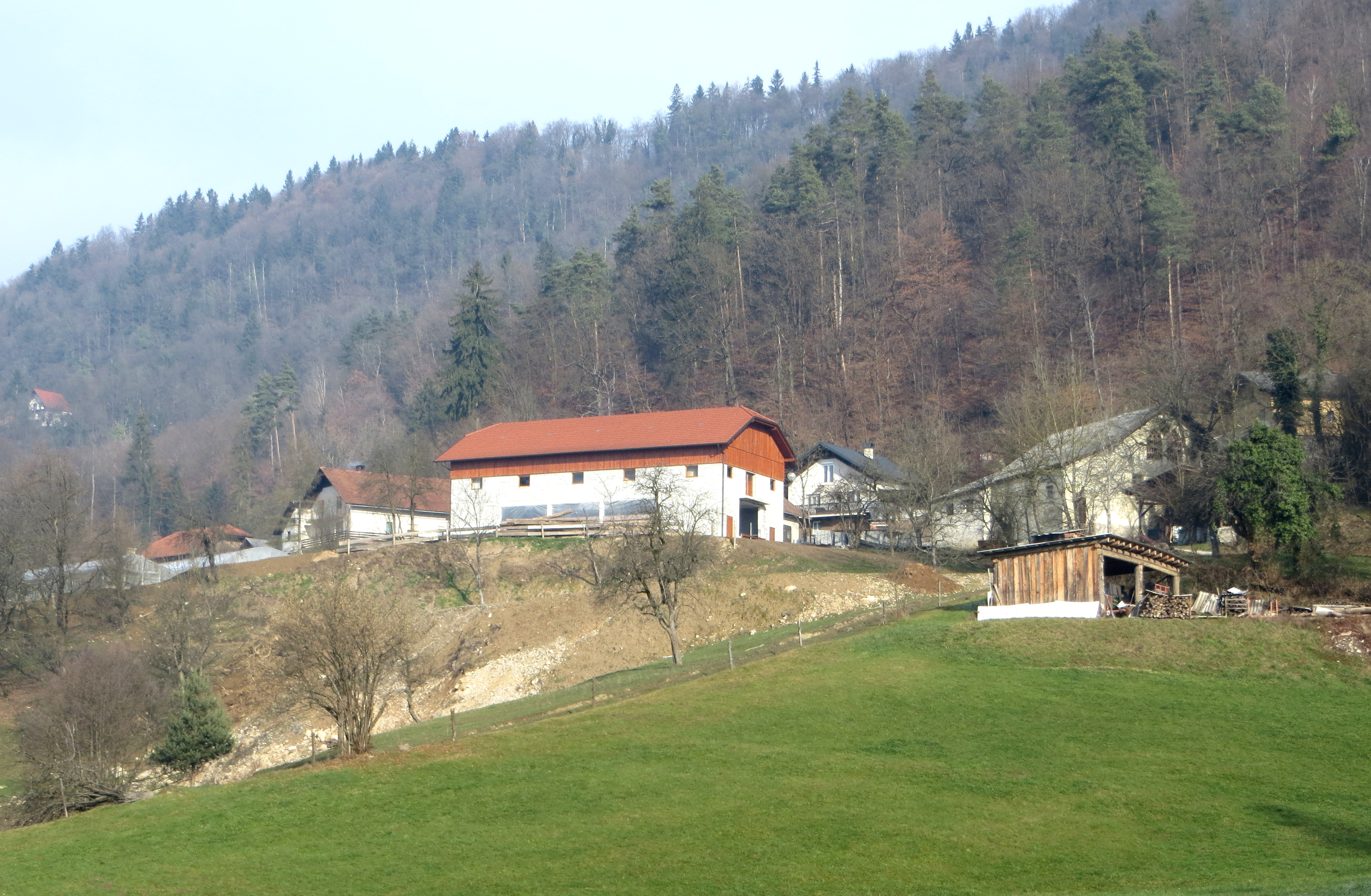

- Location in Slovenia
- Coordinates: 46°6′31.69″N 14°41′9.74″E
- Country: Slovenia
- Traditional region: Upper Carniola
- Statistical region: Central Slovenia
- Municipality: Dol pri Ljubljani

Area
  - Total: 3.84 km^{2} (1.48 sq mi)
- Elevation: 383.9 m (1,260 ft)

Population (2020)
  - Total: 92
  - Density: 24/km^{2} (62/sq mi)

Osredke (pronounced [ɔˈsɾeːtkɛ]) is a dispersed settlement north of Dolsko in the Municipality of Dol pri Ljubljani in the Upper Carniola region of Slovenia.
