= Zagorica pri Dolskem =

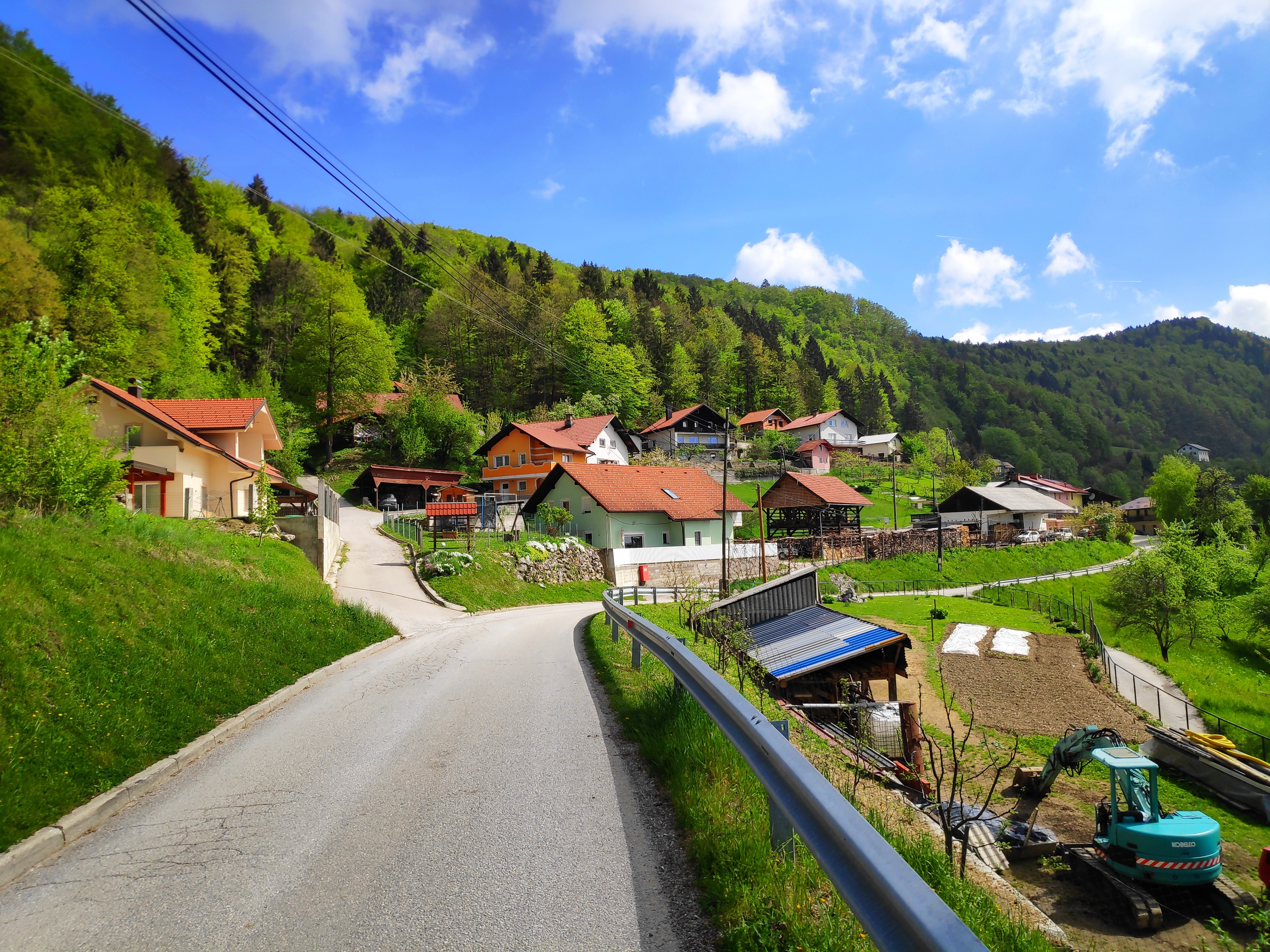

- Location in Slovenia
- Coordinates: 46°6′30.91″N 14°42′24.25″E
- Country: Slovenia
- Traditional region: Upper Carniola
- Statistical region: Central Slovenia
- Municipality: Dol pri Ljubljani

Area
  - Total: 1.35 km^{2} (0.52 sq mi)
- Elevation: 546.9 m (1,794 ft)

Population (2020)
  - Total: 106
  - Density: 78.5/km^{2} (203/sq mi)

Zagorica pri Dolskem (pronounced [ˈzaːɡɔɾica] or [zaɡɔˈɾiːca] [pɾi ˈdoːu̯skɛm] or [pɾi ˈdoːlskɛm]) is a dispersed settlement in the hills northeast of Dolsko in the Municipality of Dol pri Ljubljani in the Upper Carniola region of Slovenia.

== Name ==
The name of the settlement was changed from Zagorica to Zagorica pri Dolskem in 1955.

== History ==
During the Second World War, Partisan forces took up positions in Zagorica and neighboring Križevska Vas. The Partisans retreated from the villages toward Vače when a German column approached on 18 August 1944, and evidence was collected from the school and rectory that the Partisans had been there for an extended time. Eight men from Zagorica and Križevska Vas were arrested for collaboration with the Partisans and imprisoned in Kamnik. On 24 August 1944, Russian Liberation Army troops forced the villagers from their homes and then searched and looted the houses. The people were then ordered to collect their belongings. The Russian Liberation Army forces escorted the villagers to Dolsko and then burned Zagorica and Križevska Vas. The villagers were not permitted to return home until the end of the war.

Among the structures destroyed in the fire was the original wooden house where Jurij Vega (1754–1802) was born. It was replaced by a brick structure, and a 1904 plaque commemorating the 150th anniversary of Vega's birth was reinstalled on the house.

== Notable people ==
Notable people that were born or lived in Zagorica pri Dolskem include:

- Jurij Vega (1754–1802), mathematician

== Gallery ==
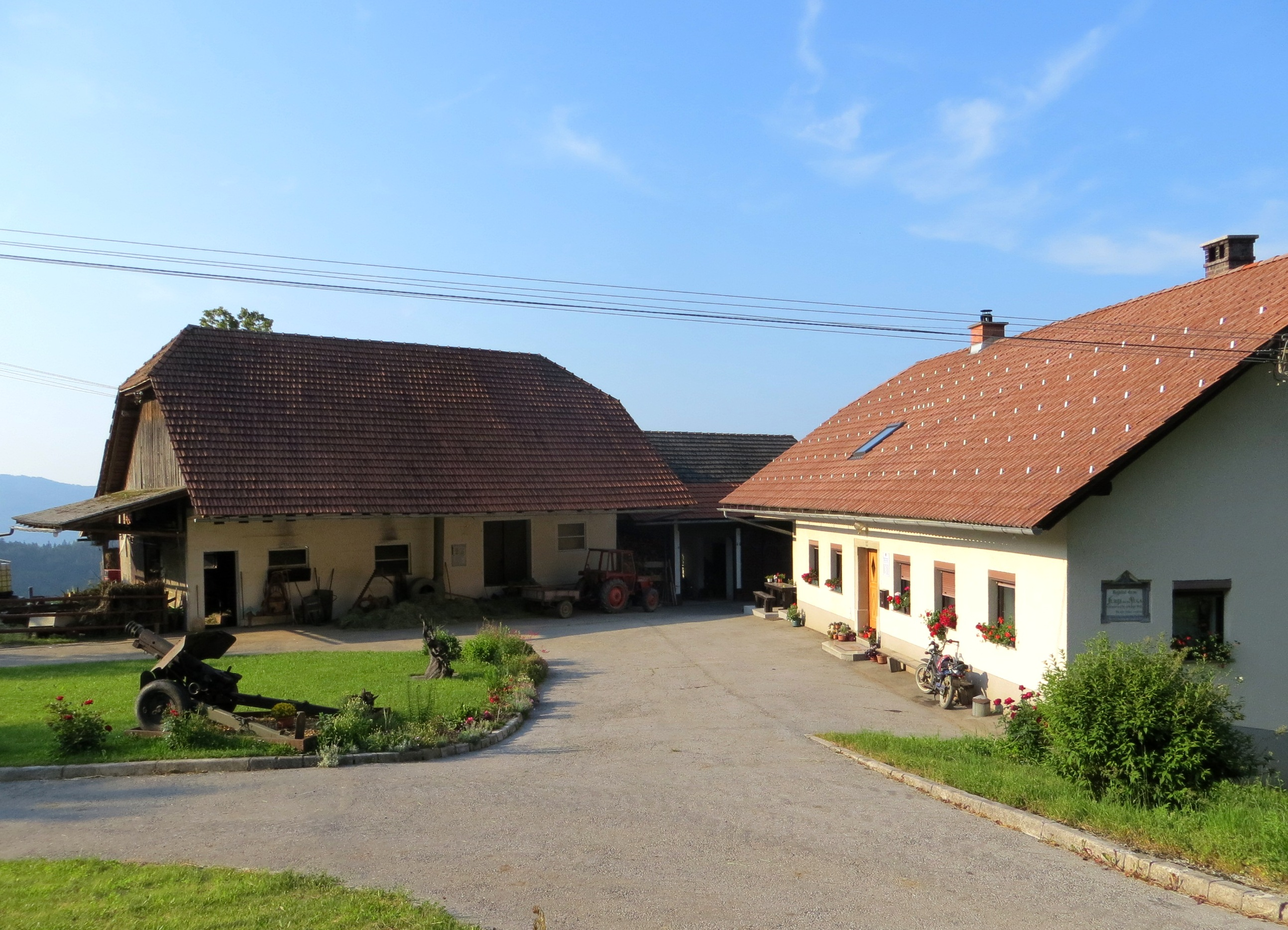
The Vehovec Farm, birthplace of Jurij Vega

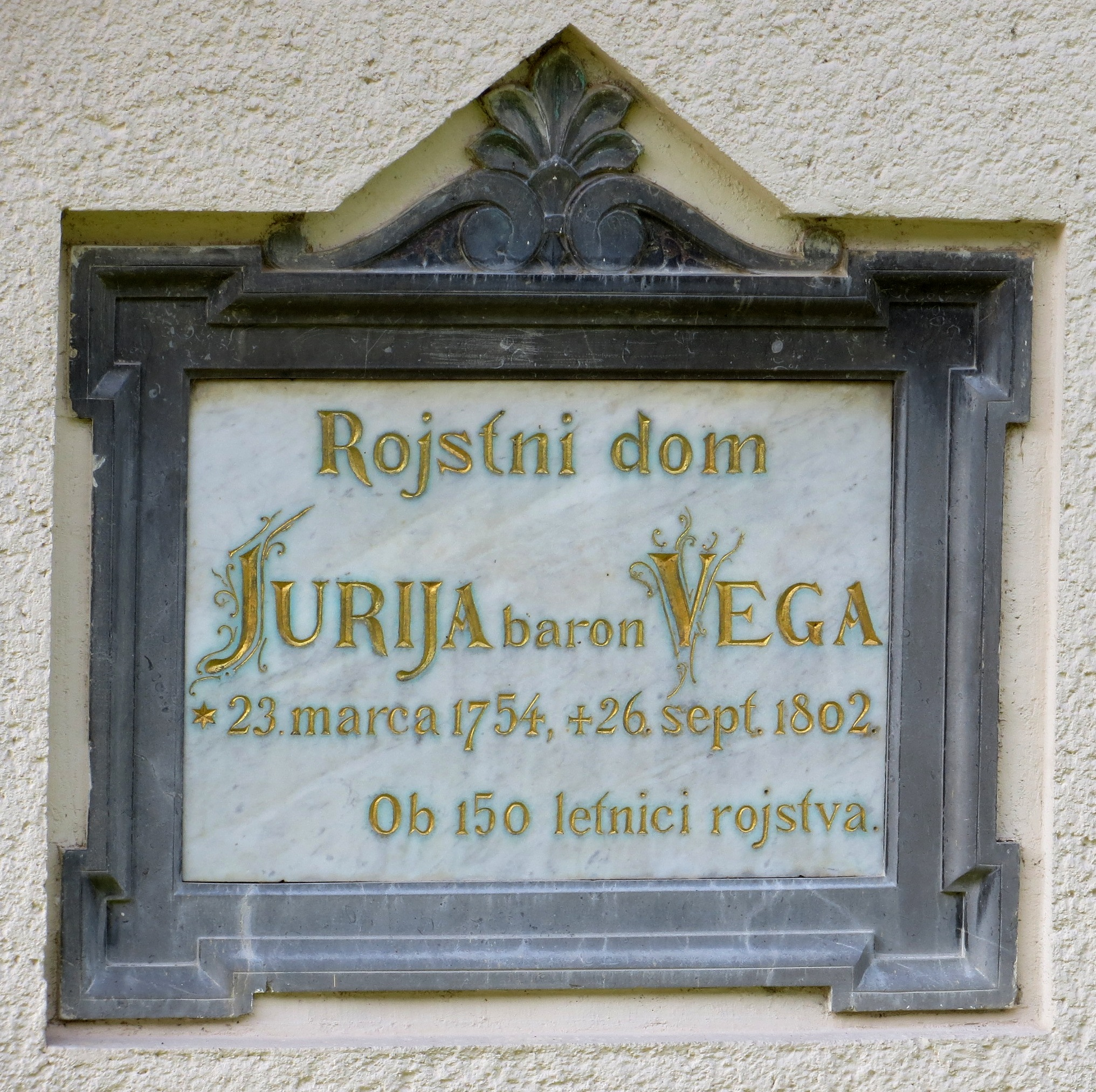
Plaque on the house where Jurij Vega was born

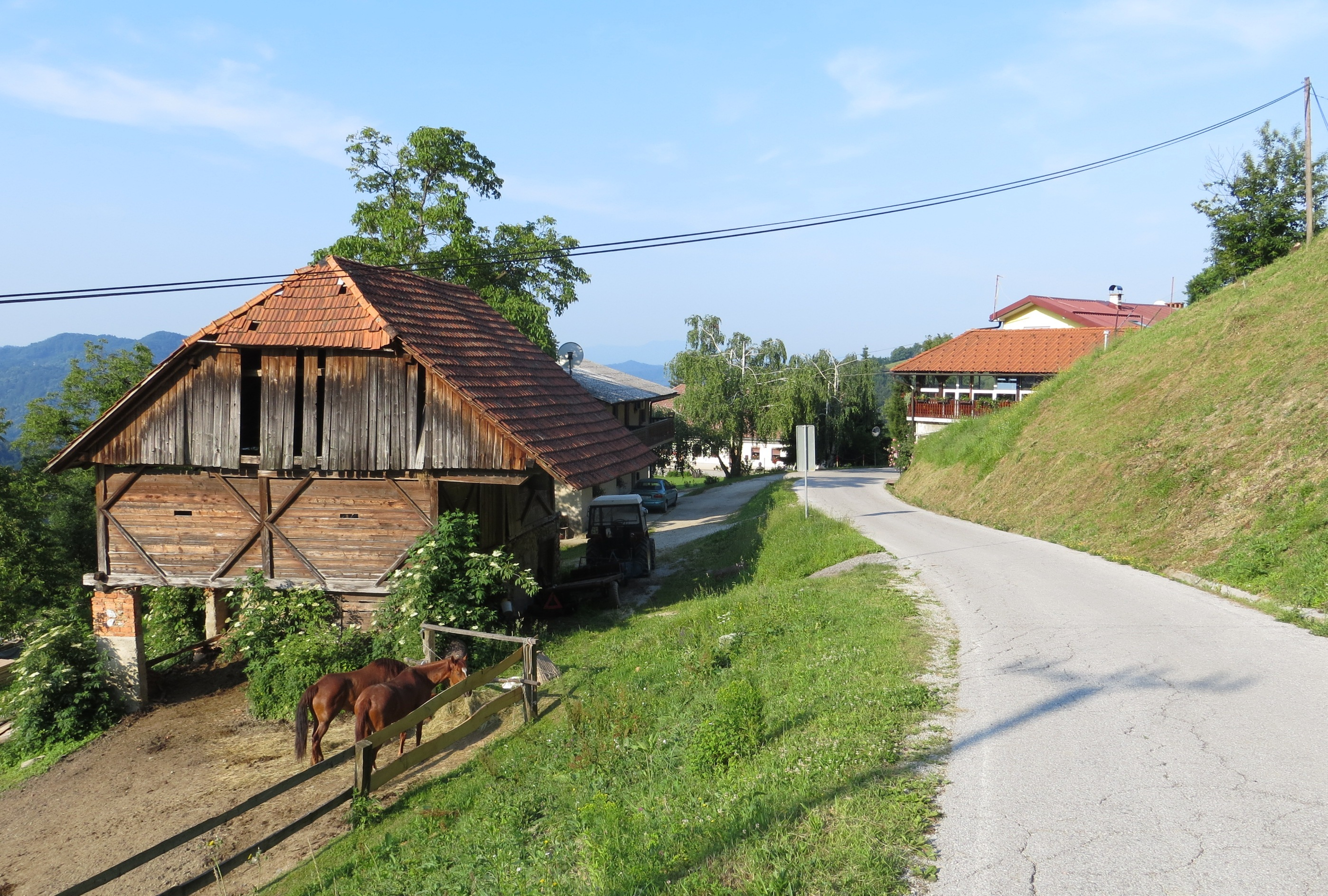
Farm in Zagorica pri Dolskem
