= Kleče pri Dolu =

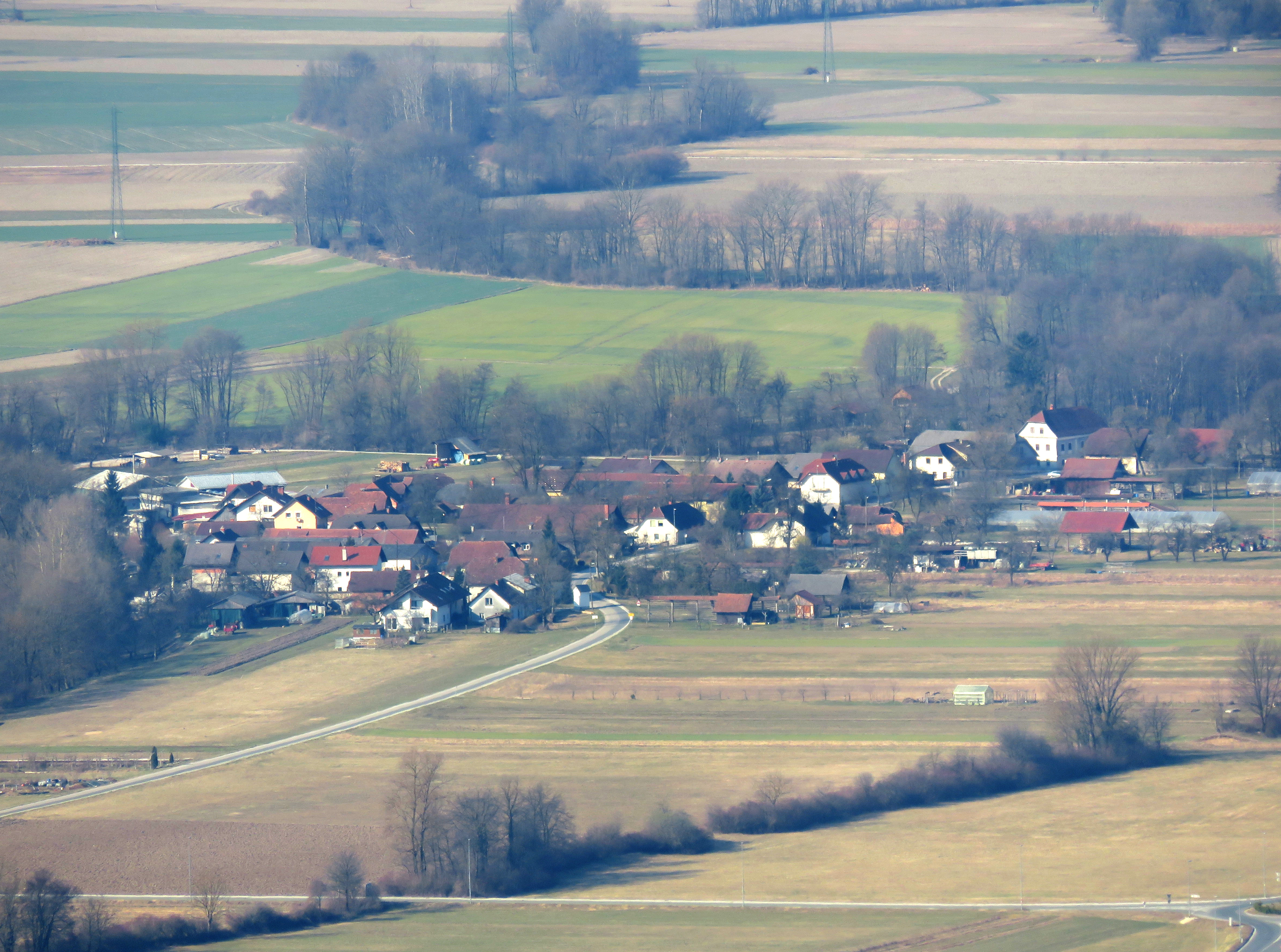

- Location in Slovenia
- Coordinates: 46°5′14.96″N 14°39′29.62″E
- Country: Slovenia
- Traditional region: Upper Carniola
- Statistical region: Central Slovenia
- Municipality: Dol pri Ljubljani

Area
  - Total: 1.31 km^{2} (0.51 sq mi)
- Elevation: 266.2 m (873 ft)

Population (2020)
  - Total: 130
  - Density: 99/km^{2} (260/sq mi)

Kleče pri Dolu (pronounced [ˈkleːtʃɛ pɾi ˈdoːlu]; German: Kletsche) is a village east of Dol pri Ljubljani in the eastern Upper Carniola region of Slovenia.

== Name ==
The name of the settlement was changed from Kleče to Kleče pri Dolu in 1955. In the past the German name was Kletsche.
