= Katarina Zupančič =

Katarina Zupančič – Živčkova Katra
- Born: Katarina Zupančič; April 30, 1860; Kamnica, Dol pri Ljubljani
- Died: November 2, 1918 (aged 58)
- Occupations: field labourer, straw plaiter, folk singer.

Katarina Zupančič, also known as Živčkova Katra, (30 April 1860 – 2 November 1918) was a Slovenian field labourer, straw plaiter and folk singer.

== Early life ==
She was born on 30 April 1860 into a poor Slovenian family in Kamnica. Her mother was the field labourer Marija Cotman, born in Trnjava, and her father was the shoemaker Janez Zupančič (1815–1893), born in Podgora pri Dolskem. She was an only child. They lived as tenants on a small farm. Her mother liked to sing and was also singing in parish choir. From her, Katra learned many songs, which her mother in turn had learned from her own mother. She did not attend school, as the nearest school was in Polje, twelve kilometres away, so she remained illiterate all her life.

== Work ==
All her life she earned a living as a field labourer, like her mother. She earned additional income by plaiting straw braids for hats for the straw hat factory in Domžale. At Carnival time she dressed up every year, went from house to house and sang. At the age of twenty-seven, on 26 June 1886, she gave birth to her only child, Pavel. His father is unknown. She and her son lived as tenants on a small farm in Vinje.

== Folk songs ==
In 1910, Franc Kramar, an organist and collector of folk songs, visited Katra. He visited her three times. On his first visit, on 20 June 1910, he wrote down, with musical notation, more than 30 songs as she dictated them. He visited her again around 15 August of the same year, when she sang him another 50 songs. He visited her for the last time on 2 October, when she sang 20 songs for him. Altogether she sang more than 200 songs for him, but Kramar wrote down only 106 of them, as he had already heard and written down the others from other folk singers. Of these 106 recorded songs, 36 are narrative songs, 17 love songs, 15 religious songs, 7 funeral songs, 8 military and historical songs, 5 about single and married life, 5 satirical songs, 3 Christmas carols, 3 drinking songs, 3 work songs, one wedding song and 4 on various other themes.

Some of these songs were published in the first and second volumes of Slovenske ljudske pesmi (Slovenian folk songs). Two were published in the collection of folk songs Stare žalostne (Old Sad Ones), and two in the fourth volume of Slovenske narodne pesmi (Slovenian National songs) from the collection edited by Karlo Štrekelj, which Franc Kramar edited after his death.

The best-known song that she related to him is Pegam in Lambergar (Pegam and Lambergar) .

The Ljubljana Committee for Folk Song in Austria-Hungary acknowledged Katra's importance for musical folkloristics by having her photographed, seated on a low wall by the stove and dressed in national costume. This is the first official photograph of any Slovenian folk singer.

== Later life and death ==
In 1911 her son, who had become a shoemaker and accordion player, married and moved away. Katarina continued to live in Vinje and earned her living as a field labourer. She never married. She died on 2 November 1918 of Spanish flu.
