= Klopce, Dol pri Ljubljani =

Klopce
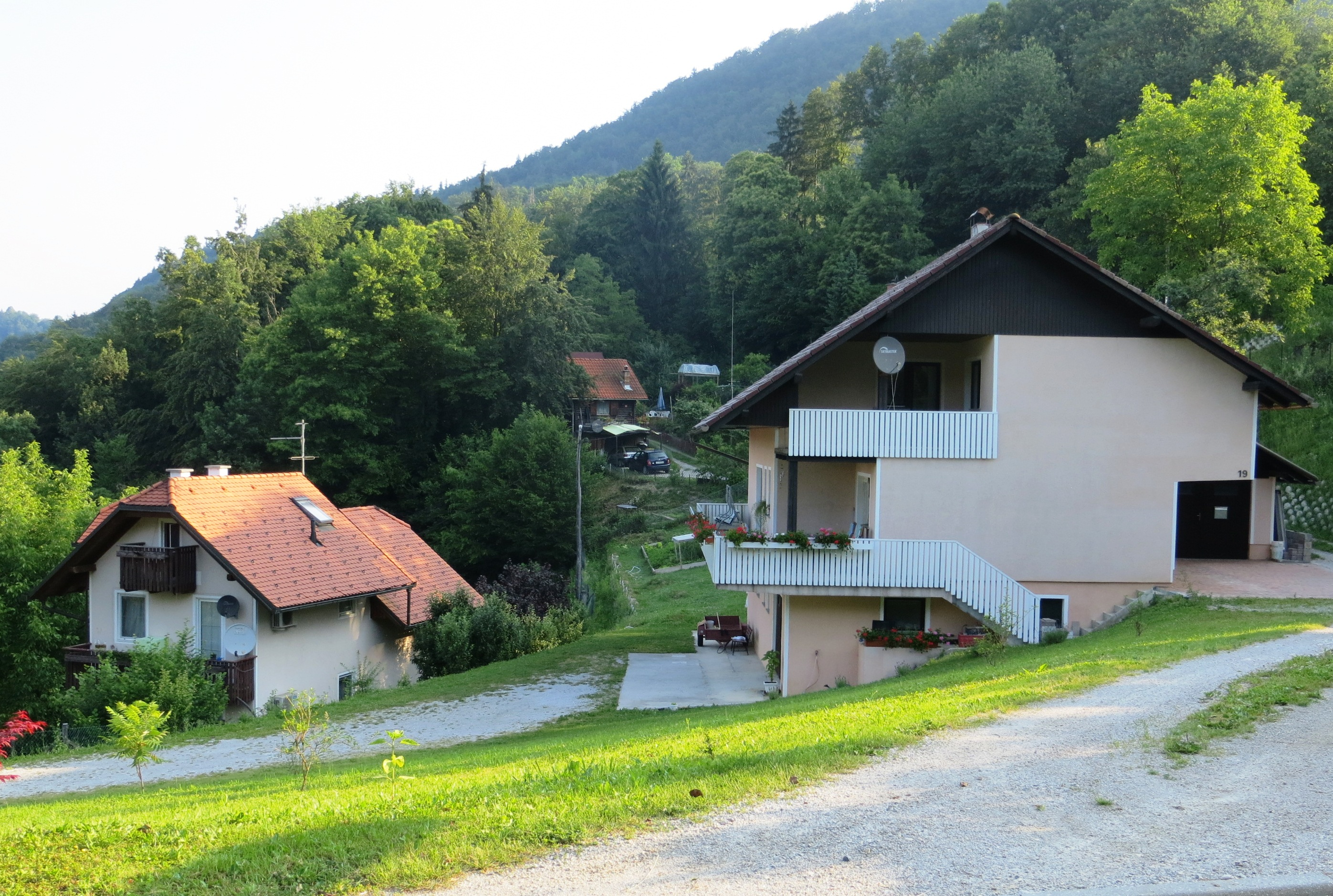

- Location in Slovenia
- Coordinates: 46°6′27.54″N 14°41′34.44″E
- Country: Slovenia
- Traditional region: Upper Carniola
- Statistical region: Central Slovenia
- Municipality: Dol pri Ljubljani

Area
  - Total: 1.05 km^{2} (0.41 sq mi)
- Elevation: 505.9 m (1,660 ft)

Population (2020)
  - Total: 82
  - Density: 78/km^{2} (200/sq mi)

Klopce (pronounced [ˈkloːptsɛ]) is a dispersed settlement in the hills northeast of Dolsko in the Municipality of Dol pri Ljubljani in the eastern Upper Carniola region of Slovenia.
