= Vrh pri Dolskem =

Vrh pri Dolskem Vrh Svetega Križa (until 1952)
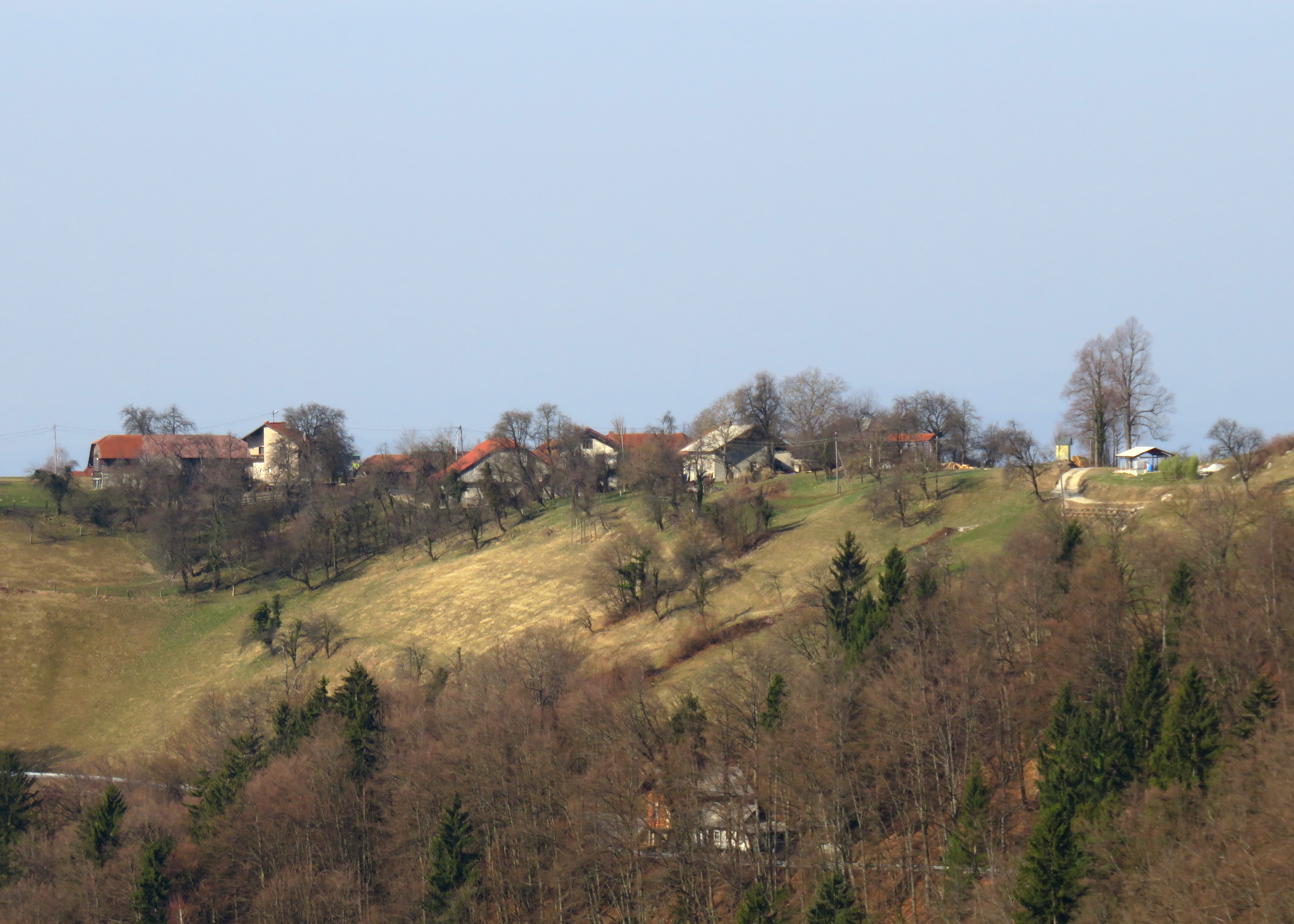

- Location in Slovenia
- Coordinates: 46°6′20.16″N 14°41′58.7″E
- Country: Slovenia
- Traditional region: Upper Carniola
- Statistical region: Central Slovenia
- Municipality: Dol pri Ljubljani

Area
  - Total: 0.6 km^{2} (0.23 sq mi)
- Elevation: 573.1 m (1,880 ft)

Population (2020)
  - Total: 21
  - Density: 35/km^{2} (91/sq mi)

Vrh pri Dolskem (pronounced [ˈʋəɾx pɾi ˈdoːu̯skɛm] or [ˈʋəɾx pɾi ˈdoːlskɛm]) is a dispersed settlement in the hills northeast of Dolsko in the Municipality of Dol pri Ljubljani in the Upper Carniola region of Slovenia.

== Name ==
The name of the settlement was changed from Vrh Svetega Križa (literally, 'Holy Cross Peak') to Vrh (literally, 'peak') in 1952. The name was changed on the basis of the 1948 Law on Names of Settlements and Designations of Squares, Streets, and Buildings as part of efforts by Slovenia's postwar communist government to remove religious elements from toponyms. The name was changed again to Vrh pri Dolskem (literally, 'peak near Dolsko') in 1955.
