= Videm, Dol pri Ljubljani =

Videm
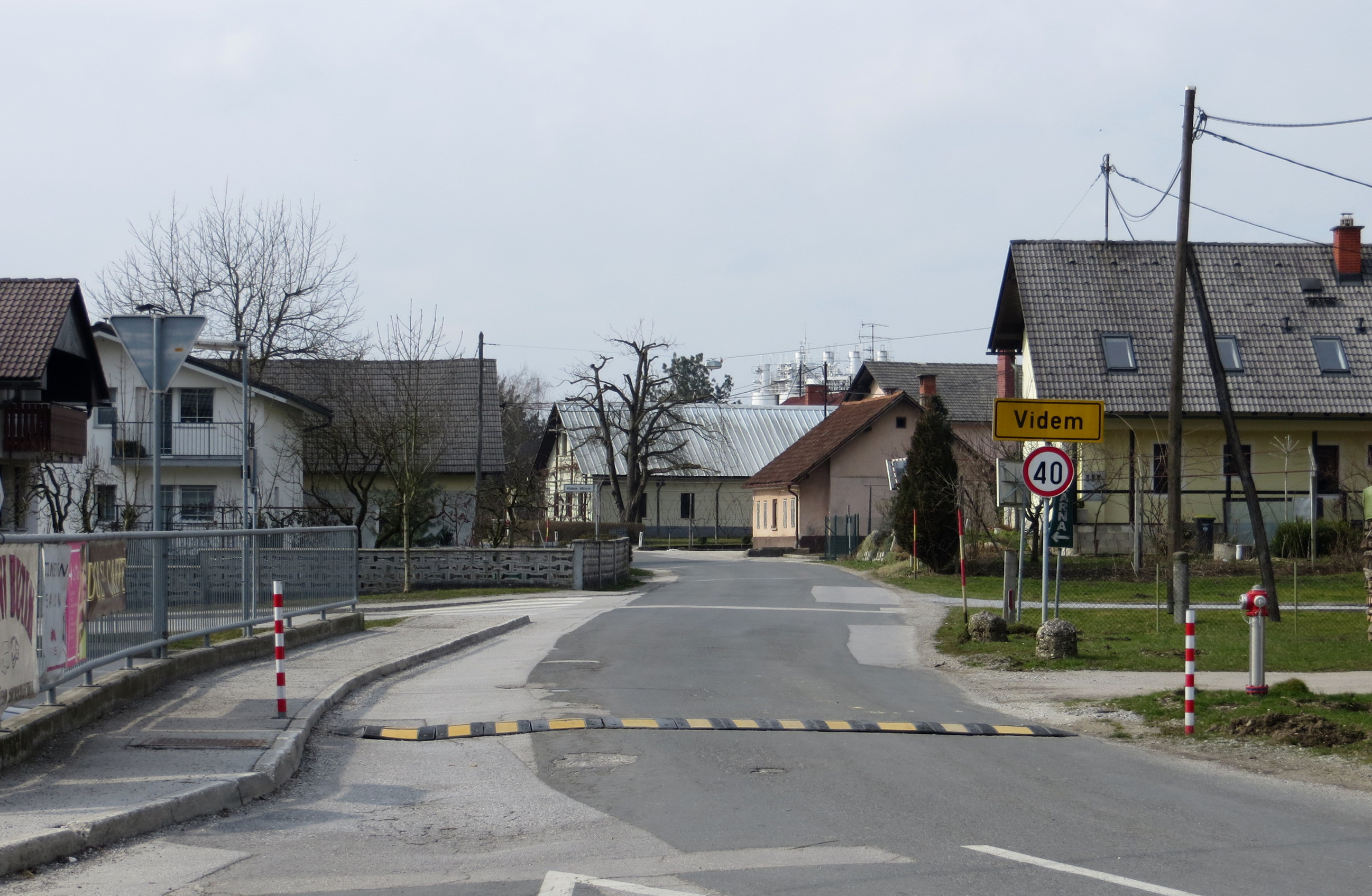

- Location in Slovenia
- Coordinates: 46°5′17.26″N 14°37′55.1″E
- Country: Slovenia
- Traditional region: Upper Carniola
- Statistical region: Central Slovenia
- Municipality: Dol pri Ljubljani

Area
  - Total: 2.65 km^{2} (1.02 sq mi)
- Elevation: 269.6 m (885 ft)

Population (2020)
  - Total: 1,180
  - Density: 445/km^{2} (1,150/sq mi)

Videm (pronounced [ˈʋiːdəm]) is a settlement next to Dol pri Ljubljani in the southeastern part of the Upper Carniola region of Slovenia.
