= Križevska Vas, Dol pri Ljubljani =

Križevska Vas Sveti Križ (until 1952)
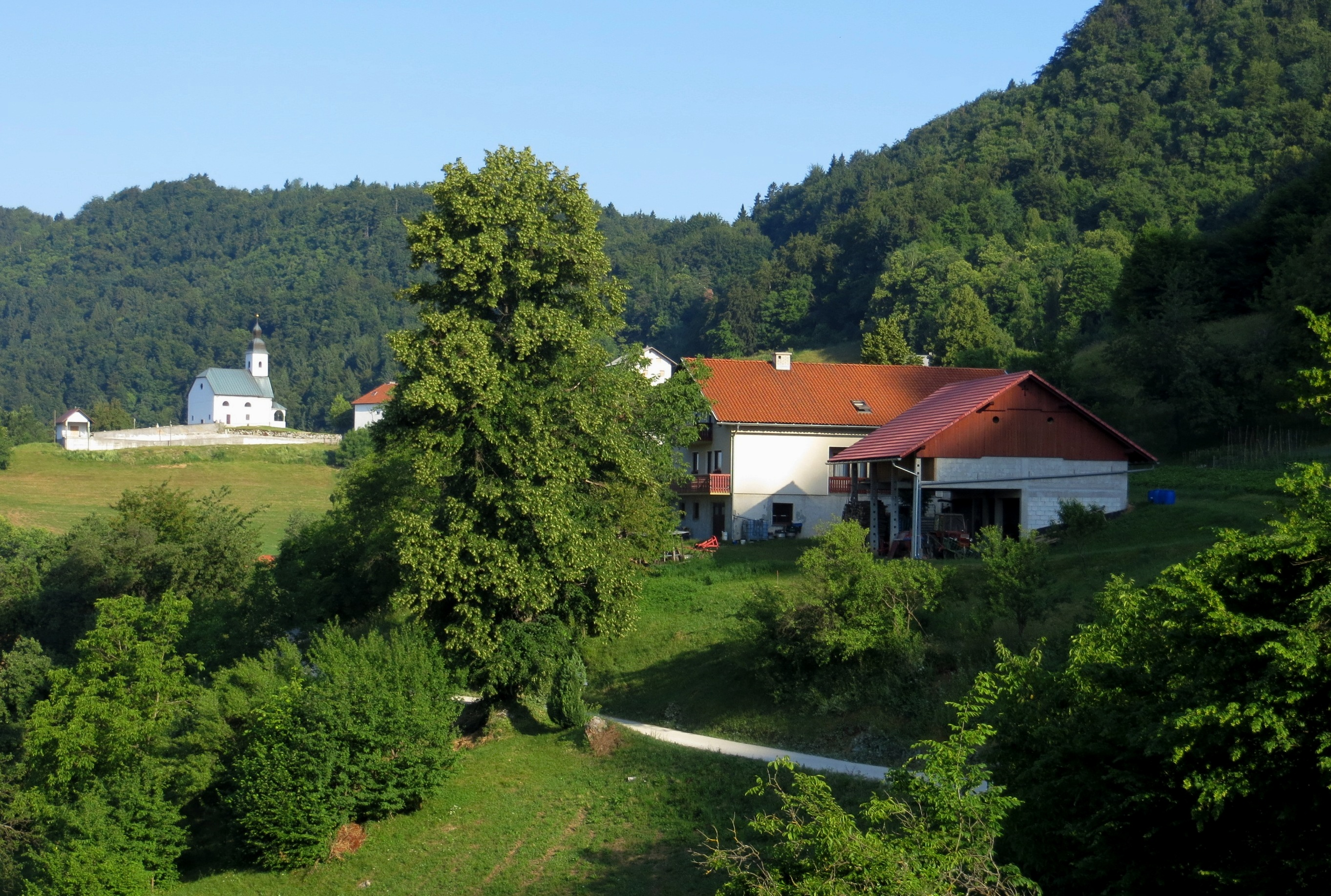

- Location in Slovenia
- Coordinates: 46°6′31.65″N 14°42′59.18″E
- Country: Slovenia
- Traditional region: Upper Carniola
- Statistical region: Central Slovenia
- Municipality: Dol pri Ljubljani

Area
  - Total: 0.84 km^{2} (0.32 sq mi)
- Elevation: 550.5 m (1,806 ft)

Population (2020)
  - Total: 44
  - Density: 52/km^{2} (140/sq mi)

Križevska Vas (pronounced [kɾiˈʒeːu̯ska ˈʋaːs]; Slovene: Križevska vas; German: Sankt Crucis, Kreuzdorf) is a small settlement in the Municipality of Dol pri Ljubljani in the eastern Upper Carniola region of Slovenia.

== Name ==
The name of the settlement was changed from Sveti Križ (literally, 'Holy Cross') to Križevska vas in 1952. The name was changed on the basis of the 1948 Law on Names of Settlements and Designations of Squares, Streets, and Buildings as part of efforts by Slovenia's postwar communist government to remove religious elements from toponyms. In the 19th century, the German name was Sankt Crucis.

== History ==
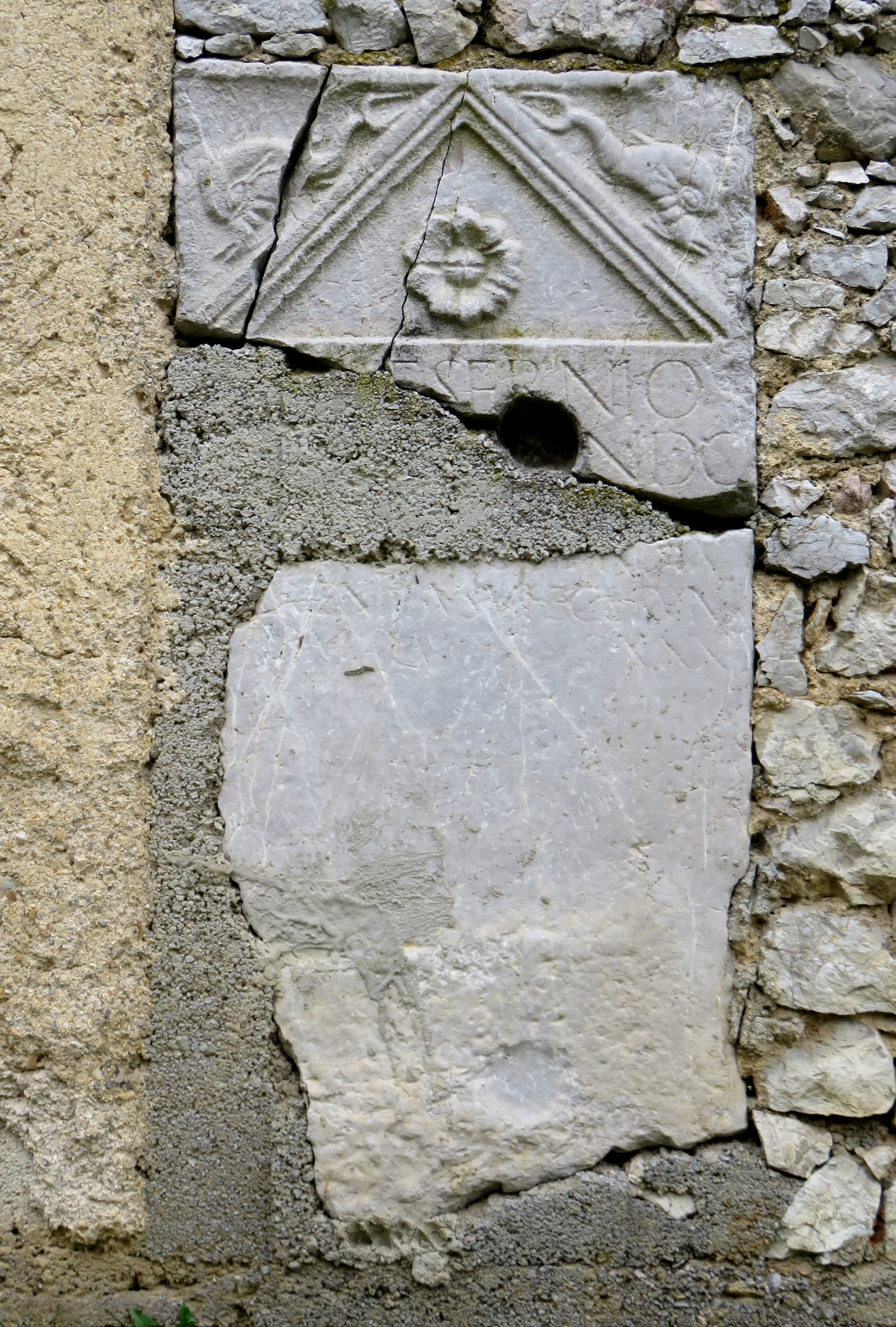
Roman gravestone embedded in a barn wall

The remains of a prehistoric settlement with embankments stand above the village, testifying to early settlement of the area. The remnants of a Roman building with a decorative mosaic were discovered at the Vodnik farm in 1939 while excavating the late Gothic foundations of the original church. A Roman sarcophagus was also discovered. It had been reused for an early Slavic burial and contained burial goods from the Köttlach culture.

A part-time school was established in 1899, and became a full-time school in 1929. A schoolhouse was built in 1938.

During the Second World War, Partisan forces took up positions in Križevska Vas and neighboring Zagorica pri Dolskem. The Partisans retreated from the villages toward Vače when a German column approached on 18 August 1944, and evidence was collected from the school and rectory that the Partisans had been there for an extended time. Eight men from Križevska Vas and Zagorica were arrested for collaboration with the Partisans and imprisoned in Kamnik. On 24 August 1944, Russian Liberation Army troops forced the villagers from their homes and then searched and looted the houses. The people were then ordered to collect their belongings. The Russian Liberation Army forces escorted the villagers to Dolsko and then burned Križevska Vas and Zagorica. The villagers were not permitted to return home until the end of the war. Among the structures damaged in the fire was Holy Cross Church and the schoolhouse.

== Church ==
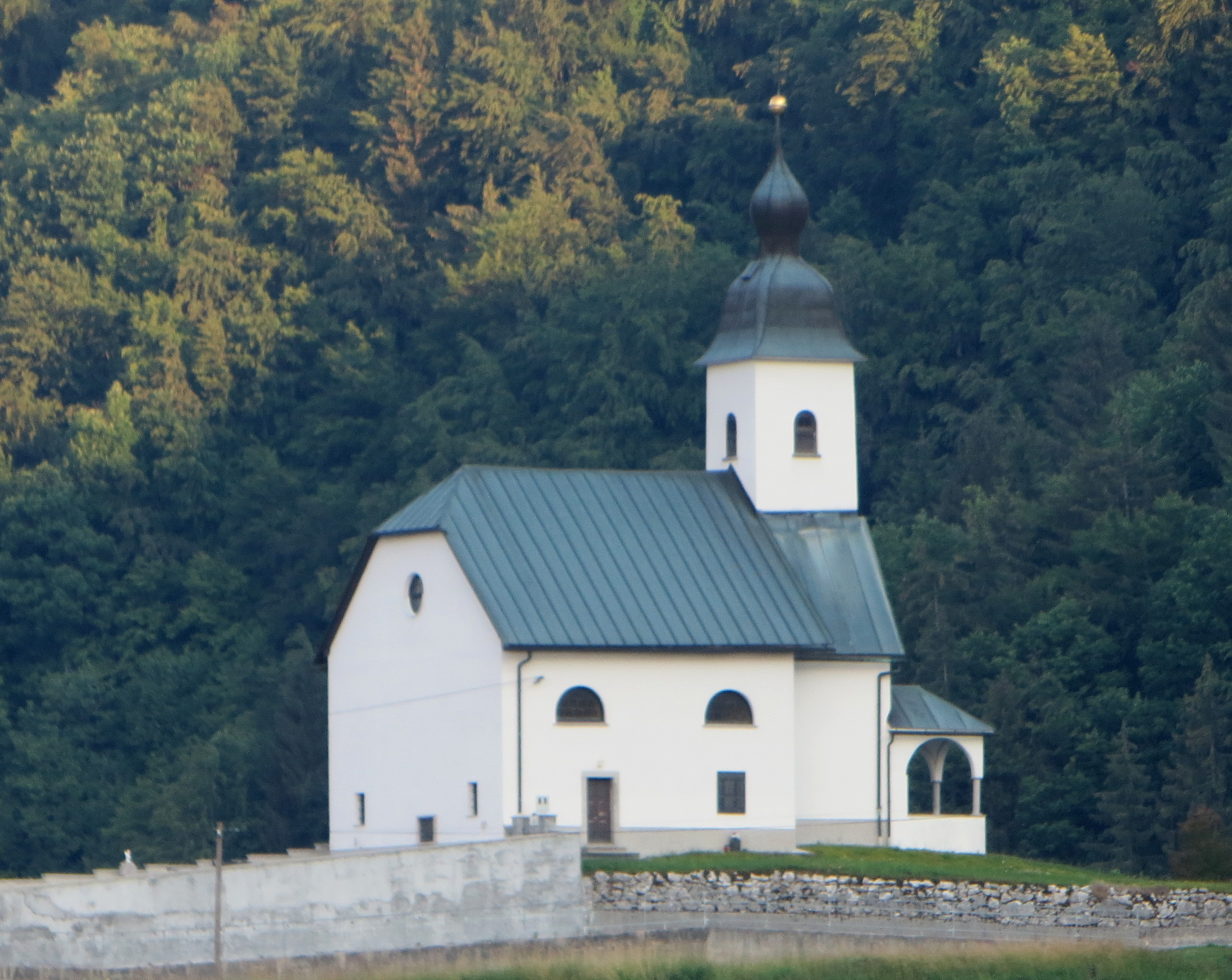
Holy Cross Church

The local church, dedicated to the Holy Cross, was first mentioned in written sources in 1526. The very first church in the village stood at a somewhat lower location, next to the Vodnik house. The current church was restored after being damaged in a fire in 1944. There is a small cemetery behind the church. The cemetery was established by the priest Anton Komlanec (1884–1966) after he was assigned to the parish. Previously the villagers had used the cemetery in Moravče, an hour and a half away.

== Notable people ==
Notable people that were born or lived in Križevska Vas include:

- Janez Povirek (1892–1920), sculptor
- Krista Povirk (1938–2004), catechist, poet, and choir director
