= Zajelše =

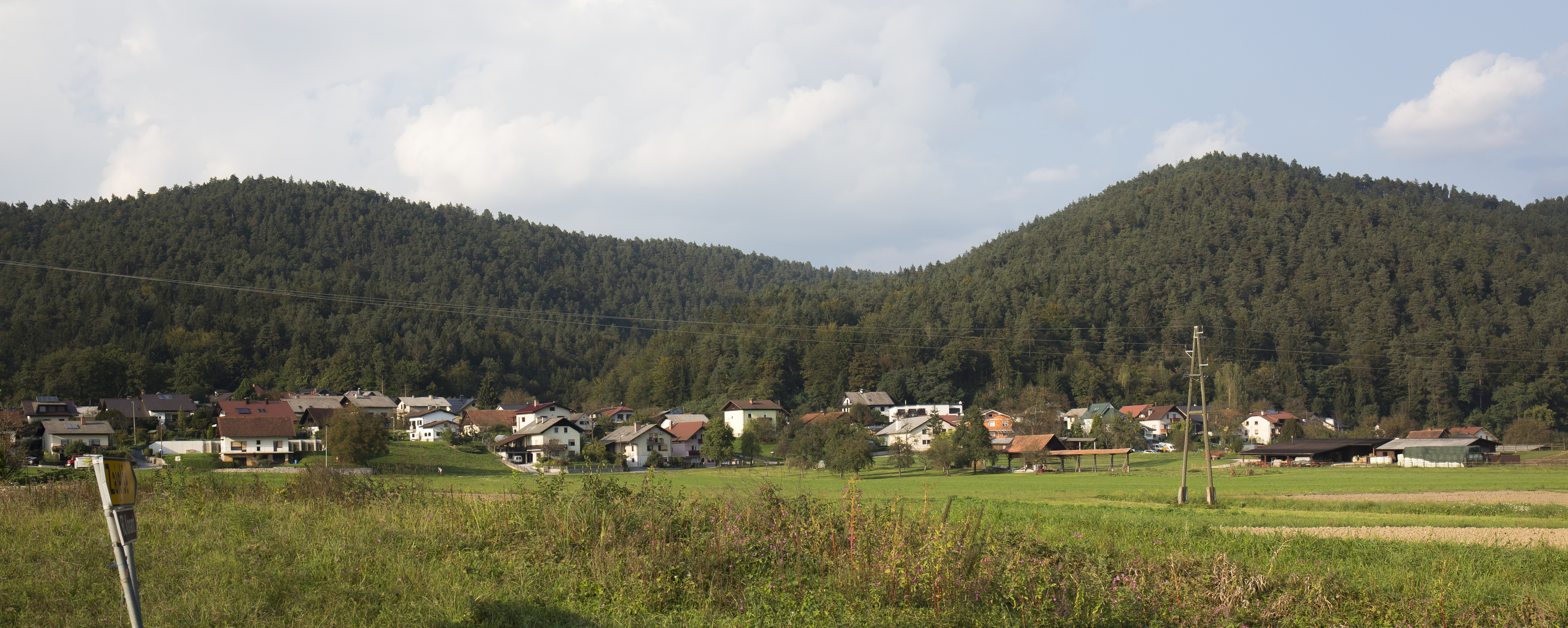

- Location in Slovenia
- Coordinates: 46°5′37.21″N 14°38′57.36″E
- Country: Slovenia
- Traditional region: Upper Carniola
- Statistical region: Central Slovenia
- Municipality: Dol pri Ljubljani

Area
  - Total: 0.95 km^{2} (0.37 sq mi)
- Elevation: 276.4 m (907 ft)

Population (2020)
  - Total: 262
  - Density: 280/km^{2} (710/sq mi)

Zajelše (pronounced [zaˈjeːu̯ʃɛ]; German: Sajeusche) is a settlement north of Dol pri Ljubljani in the southeastern part of the Upper Carniola region of Slovenia.
