= Petelinje, Dol pri Ljubljani =

Petelinje
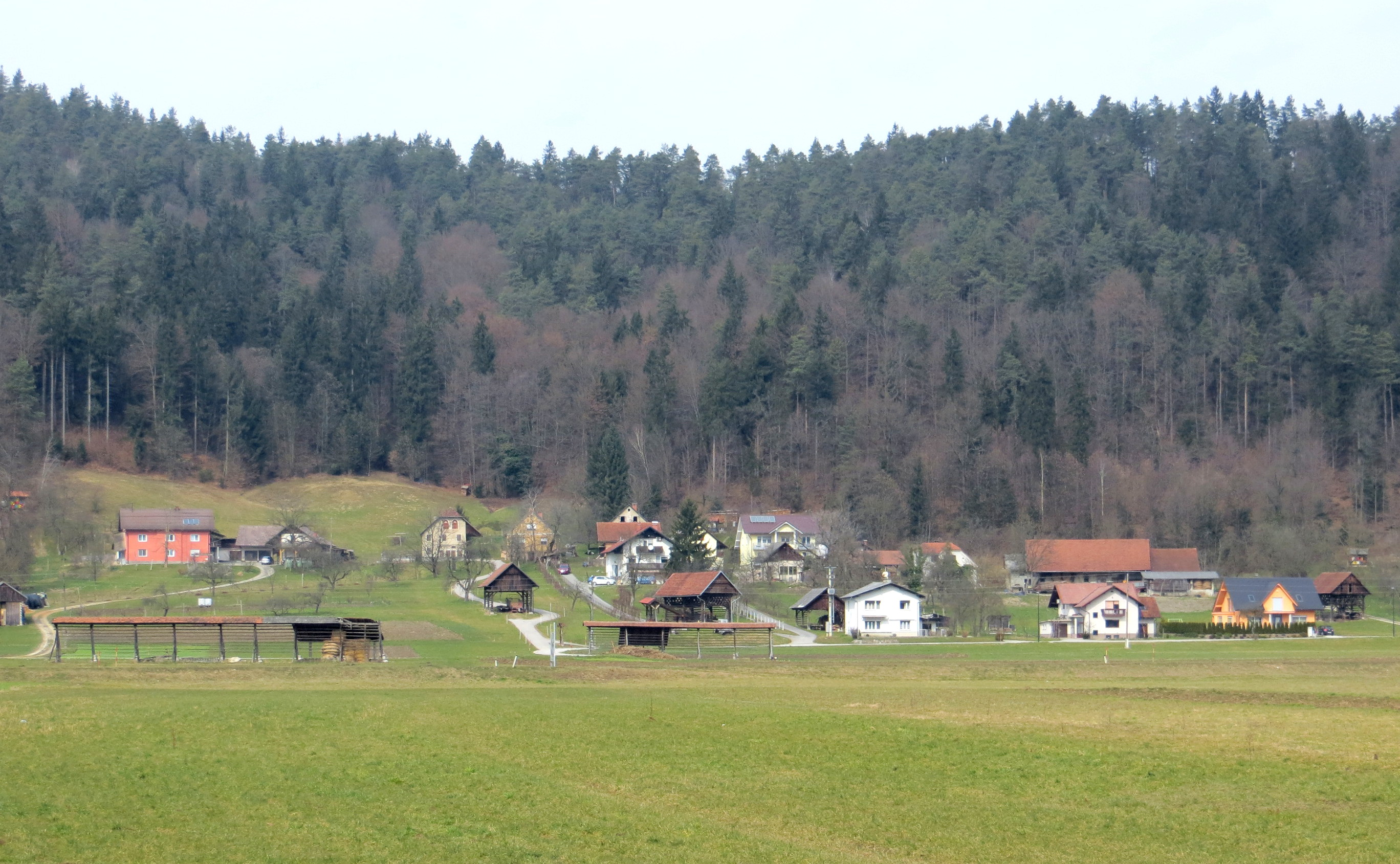

- Location in Slovenia
- Coordinates: 46°5′40.99″N 14°40′9.5″E
- Country: Slovenia
- Traditional region: Upper Carniola
- Statistical region: Central Slovenia
- Municipality: Dol pri Ljubljani

Area
  - Total: 0.74 km^{2} (0.29 sq mi)
- Elevation: 268.5 m (881 ft)

Population (2020)
  - Total: 79
  - Density: 110/km^{2} (280/sq mi)

Petelinje (pronounced [pɛtɛˈliːnjɛ]) is a small settlement near Dolsko in the Municipality of Dol pri Ljubljani in the Upper Carniola region of Slovenia.
