= Senožeti, Dol pri Ljubljani =

Senožeti
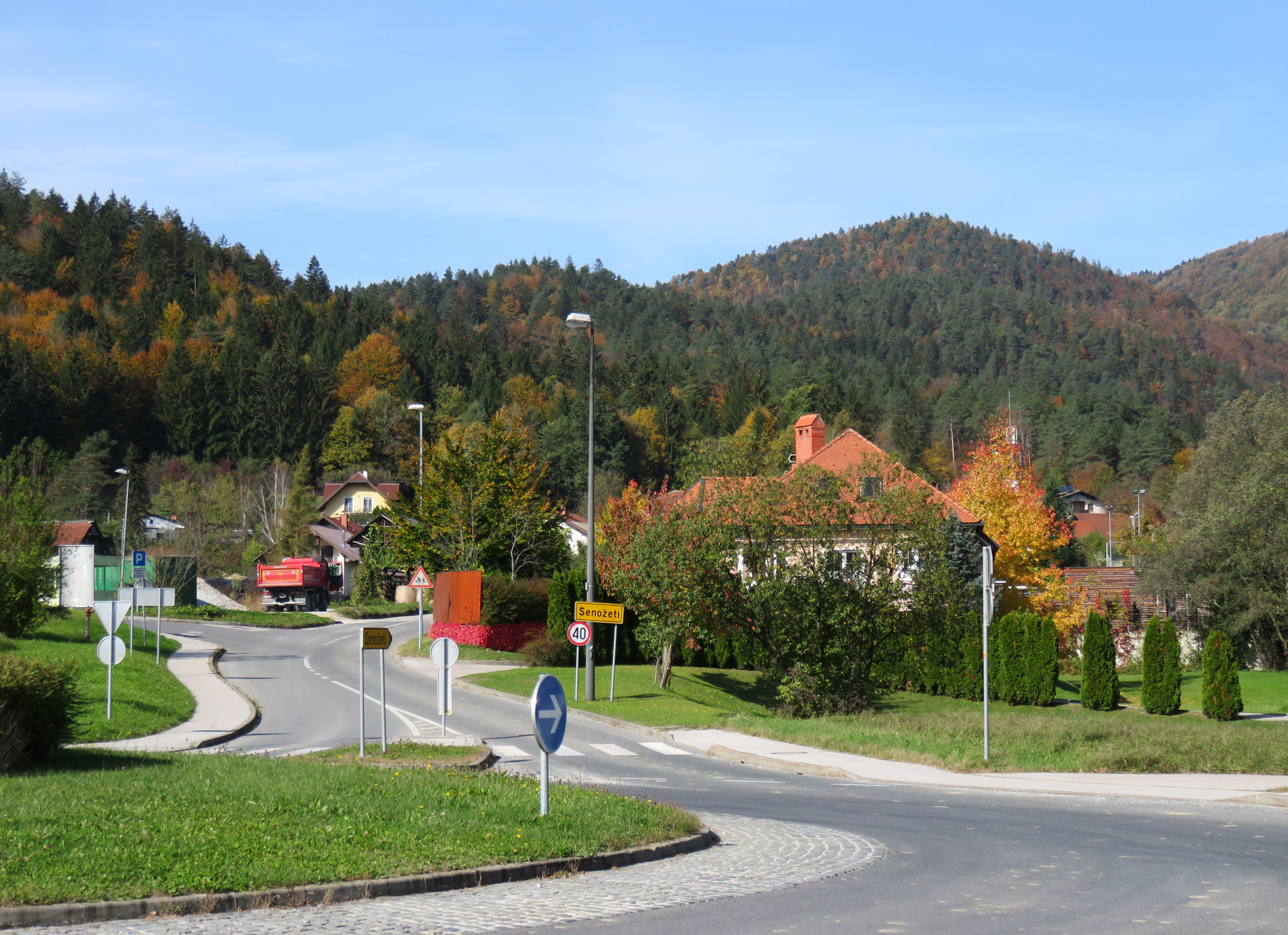

- Location in Slovenia
- Coordinates: 46°5′33.19″N 14°44′11.17″E
- Country: Slovenia
- Traditional region: Upper Carniola
- Statistical region: Central Slovenia
- Municipality: Dol pri Ljubljani

Area
  - Total: 3.92 km^{2} (1.51 sq mi)
- Elevation: 278.7 m (914 ft)

Population (2020)
  - Total: 875
  - Density: 223/km^{2} (578/sq mi)

Senožeti (pronounced [sɛnɔˈʒeːti]; German: Senoschet) is a settlement on the left bank of the Sava River in the Municipality of Dol pri Ljubljani in the southeastern part of the Upper Carniola region of Slovenia.
