= Josef Kalasanz von Erberg =

Carniolan botanist, historian and collector

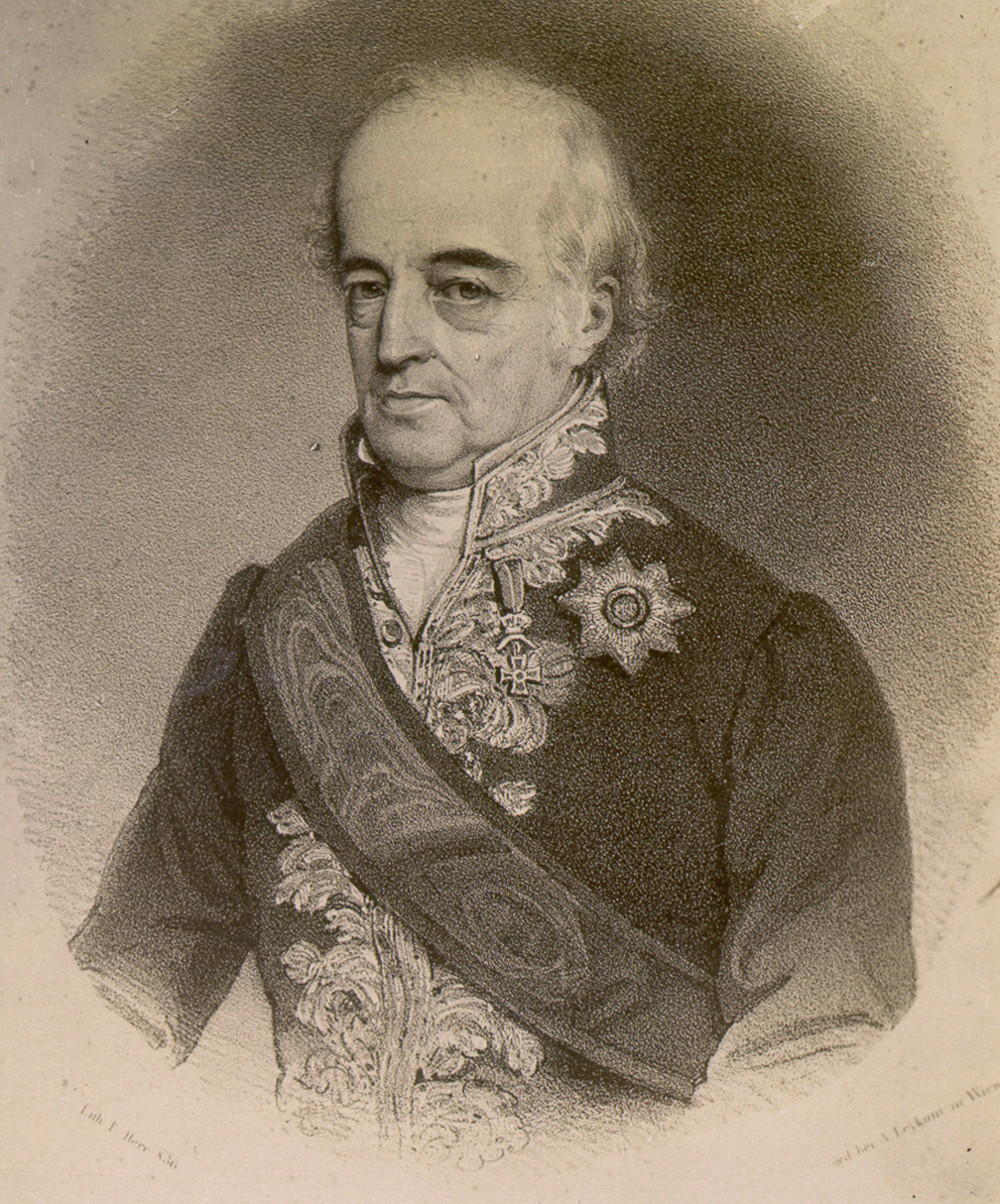
Josef Kalasanz Freiherr von Erberg

Josef Kalasanz Freiherr von Erberg (Slovene: Jožef Kalasanc baron Erberg or Josip Kalasanc baron Erberg) (27 August 1771 – 10 July 1843) was a Carniolan botanist, cultural historian, collector, and patron of the arts.

== Biography ==
Von Erberg was born in Ljubljana. After graduating from mathematics, logics, philosophy, and administrative law, he was at first a board councillor at the Carniolan Provincial Estates. In 1794, he married Josephine, Countess of Attems. They had seven children. In 1804, he became a chamberlain at the Austrian Court, and from 1809 until 1814 was the educator of the young Ferdinand I of Austria. In 1815, von Erberg moved to Dol pri Ljubljani, where he intensively collected books and numerous other cultural and natural objects from Carniola and also created a garden with over 7000 plants. He was a friend of Sigmund Zois and also corresponded with other Carniolan scientists and artists. Until the end of his life, he only rarely left Dol. In 1832, he hired Franz Franz, an officer, to inform him about events in Vienna and in Ljubljana. In the following eight years, Franz sent him about 1800 letters, which have been preserved until today and give an insight in the history of Ljubljana before the 1848 revolutions.

In 1825, von Erberg wrote the Attempt at a Sketch of the Literary History of Carniola (German: Versuch eines Entwurfes zu einer Literar-Geschichte für Crain), which he intended for his personal use. It consists of twelve questions about the literary history of his homeland and extensive answers to them. Even today, it represents a source of information about older Slovenian literary history.
