= Municipality of Dol pri Ljubljani =

Municipality of Slovenia

Municipality of Dol pri Ljubljani Občina Dol pri Ljubljani
- Municipality
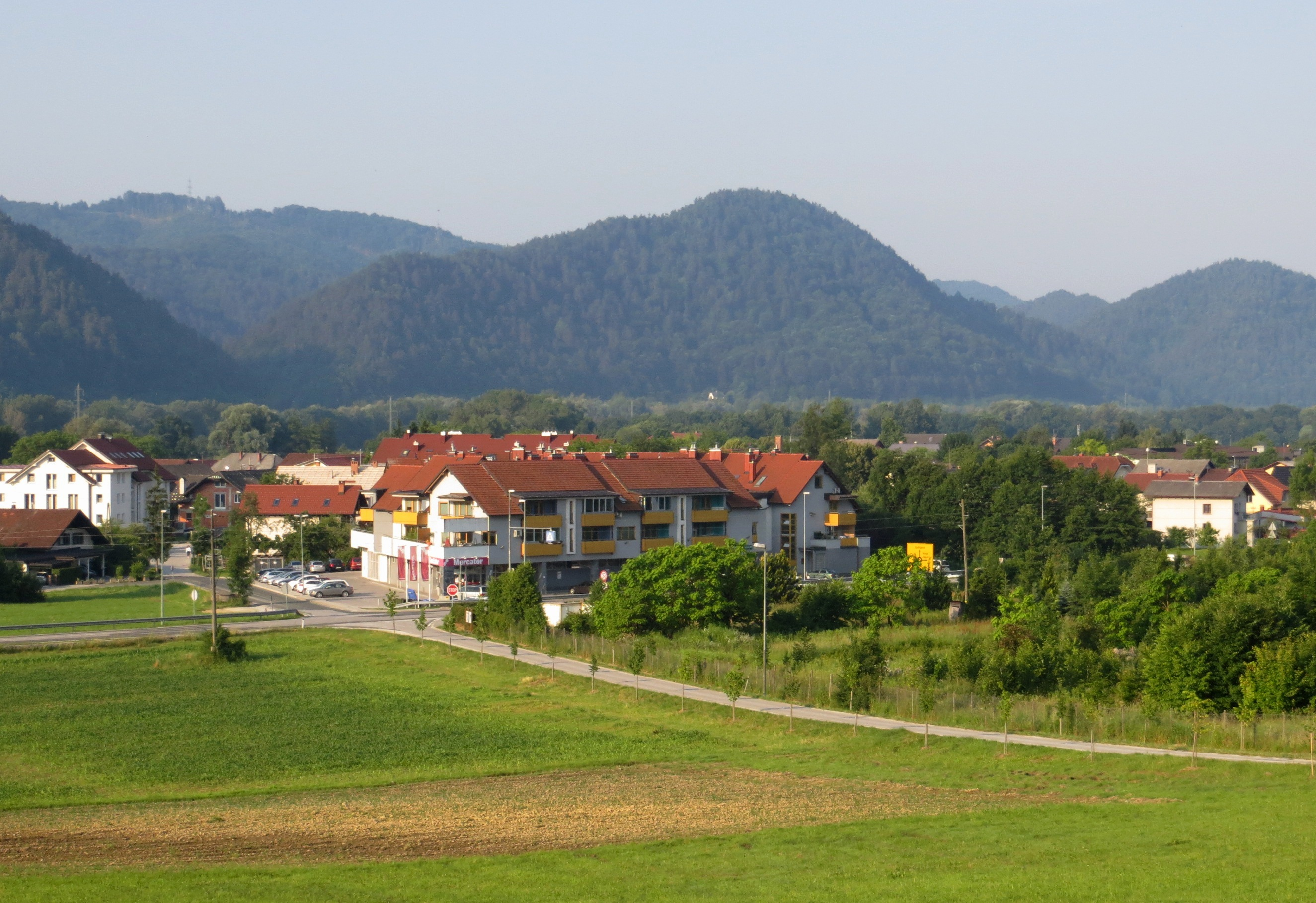

- Location of the Municipality of Dol pri Ljubljani in Slovenia
- Coordinates: 46°05′N 14°36′E
- Country: Slovenia

Government
  - Mayor: Željko Savić (Independent)

Area
  - Total: 33.3 km^{2} (12.9 sq mi)

Population (2021)
  - Total: 6,333
  - Density: 190/km^{2} (493/sq mi)
- Time zone: UTC+01 (CET)
  - Summer (DST): UTC+02 (CEST)
- Website: www.dol.si

The Municipality of Dol pri Ljubljani (pronounced [ˈdoːl pɾi ljuˈbljaːni]; Slovene: Občina Dol pri Ljubljani) is a municipality in central Slovenia. The seat of the municipality is the settlement of Dol pri Ljubljani. It is part of the traditional region of Upper Carniola and is now included in the Central Slovenia Statistical Region.

== Settlements ==
In addition to the municipal seat of Dol pri Ljubljani, the municipality also includes the following settlements:

- Beričevo
- Brinje
- Dolsko
- Kamnica
- Kleče pri Dolu
- Klopce
- Križevska Vas
- Laze pri Dolskem
- Osredke
- Petelinje
- Podgora pri Dolskem
- Senožeti
- Videm
- Vinje
- Vrh pri Dolskem
- Zaboršt pri Dolu
- Zagorica pri Dolskem
- Zajelše
