= Beričevo =

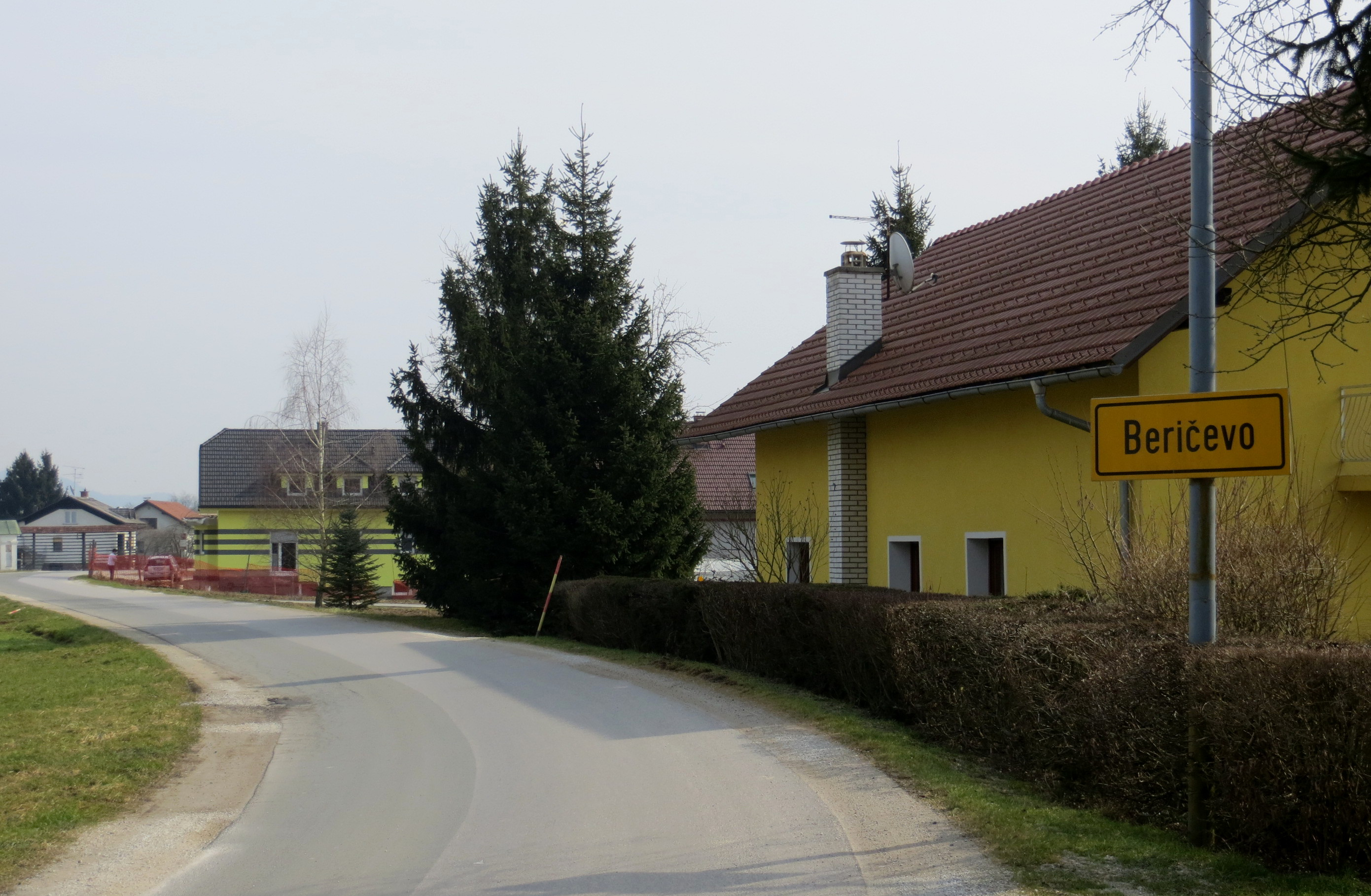

- Location in Slovenia
- Coordinates: 46°5′16.98″N 14°36′29.91″E
- Country: Slovenia
- Traditional region: Upper Carniola
- Statistical region: Central Slovenia
- Municipality: Dol pri Ljubljani

Area
  - Total: 2.91 km^{2} (1.12 sq mi)
- Elevation: 278.3 m (913 ft)

Population (2020)
  - Total: 470
  - Density: 160/km^{2} (420/sq mi)

Beričevo (pronounced [bɛˈɾiːtʃɛʋɔ]; German: Förtschach) is a settlement northeast of Ljubljana in the Municipality of Dol pri Ljubljani in the Upper Carniola region of Slovenia. It lies at the confluence of the Kamnik Bistrica River with the Sava River.

== Name ==
Beričevo was first mentioned in written sources as Werczaw in 1320 (and in 1329 as Verschach, in 1435 as Wertschach, and in 1444 as Neberitschebim). The settlement was known as Förtschach in German in the past. The name is believed to derive from *Beriťь, a patronymic of the hypocorism *Berъ. The settlement was known as Förtschach in German in the past.

== History ==
According to Valentin Vodnik, a mammoth's tooth was found in the gravel on the bank of the Sava River below the village in 1798. Until the Sava was regulated in 1886, Beričevo used to be directly on the river. Now only a remnant of the old riverbed remains. A roller mill was set up in the village before the First World War by the industrialist Ivan Knez. It was abandoned after the Second World War. During the Second World War, a Partisan checkpoint was located at the Jože Levina house behind the village from 1941 to 30 November 1943.

== Church ==
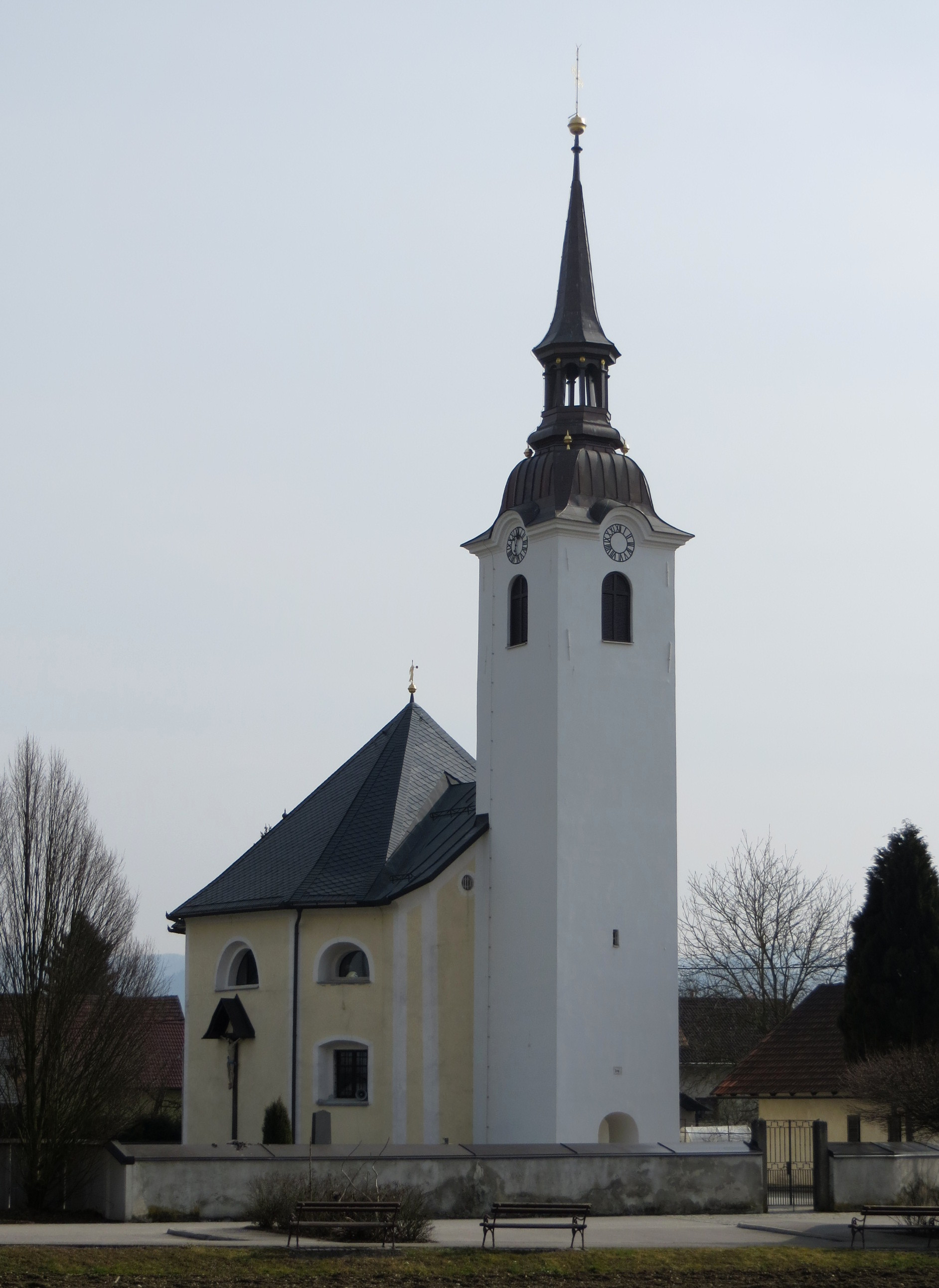
Holy Cross Church

The local church is dedicated to the Feast of the Holy Cross. The church was first mentioned in written sources in 1526. The chancel of the church is Gothic, and the nave is Baroque. The church contains an image of Our Lady of Sorrows and there is an old wayside shrine near the church.

== Notable people ==
Notable people that were born or lived in Beričevo include:

- Jurij Flajšman (1818–1874), musician and composer
- Andrej Fleischman (1805–1867), botanist
- Josip Gostinčar (1860–1942), politician
