= Brinje, Dol pri Ljubljani =

Brinje
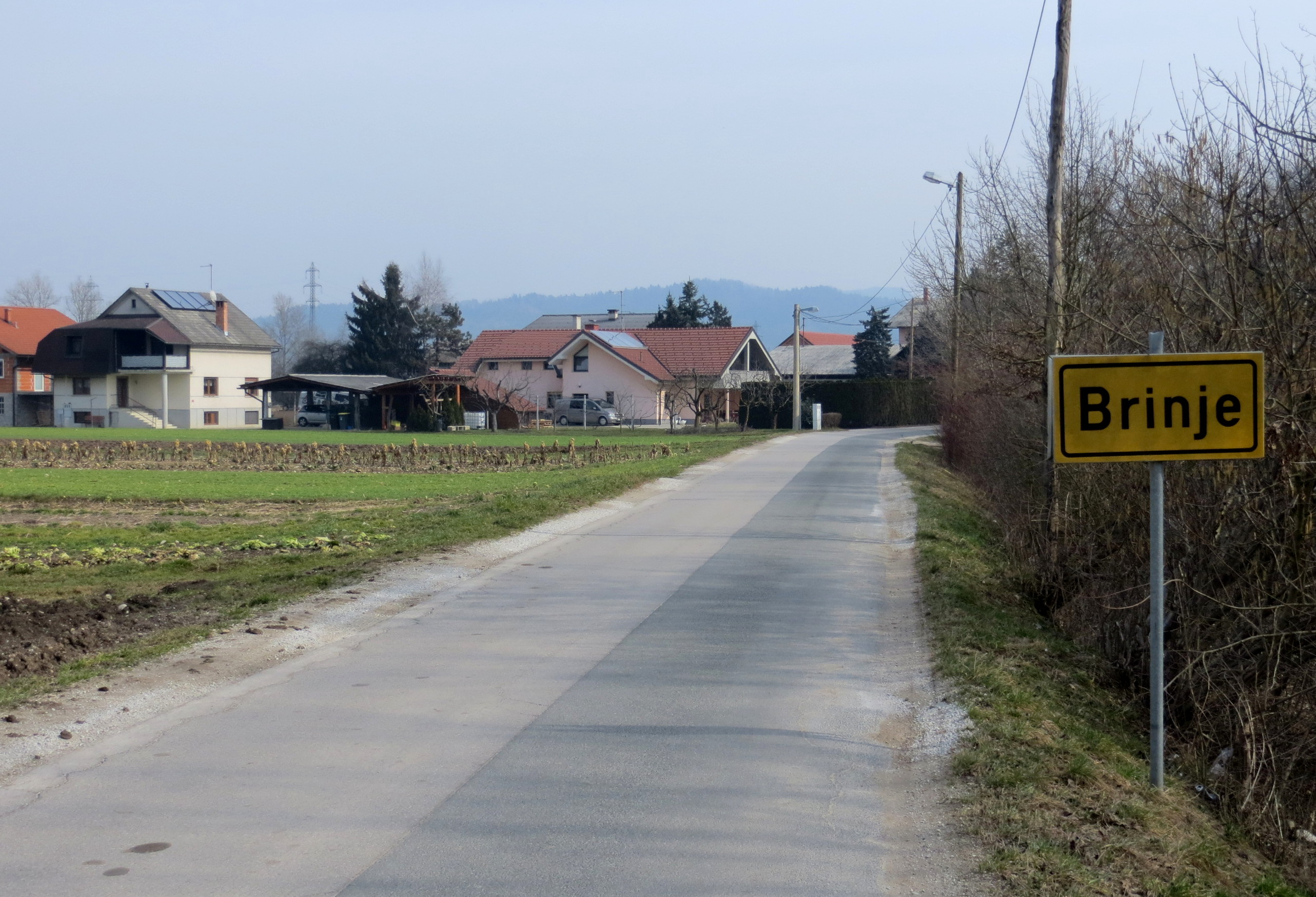

- Location in Slovenia
- Coordinates: 46°5′18.45″N 14°35′48.47″E
- Country: Slovenia
- Traditional region: Upper Carniola
- Statistical region: Central Slovenia
- Municipality: Dol pri Ljubljani

Area
  - Total: 1.12 km^{2} (0.43 sq mi)
- Elevation: 280.8 m (921 ft)

Population (2020)
  - Total: 178
  - Density: 159/km^{2} (412/sq mi)

Brinje (pronounced [ˈbɾiːnjɛ]) is a settlement northeast of Ljubljana in the Municipality of Dol pri Ljubljani in the Upper Carniola region of Slovenia.
