= Podgora pri Dolskem =

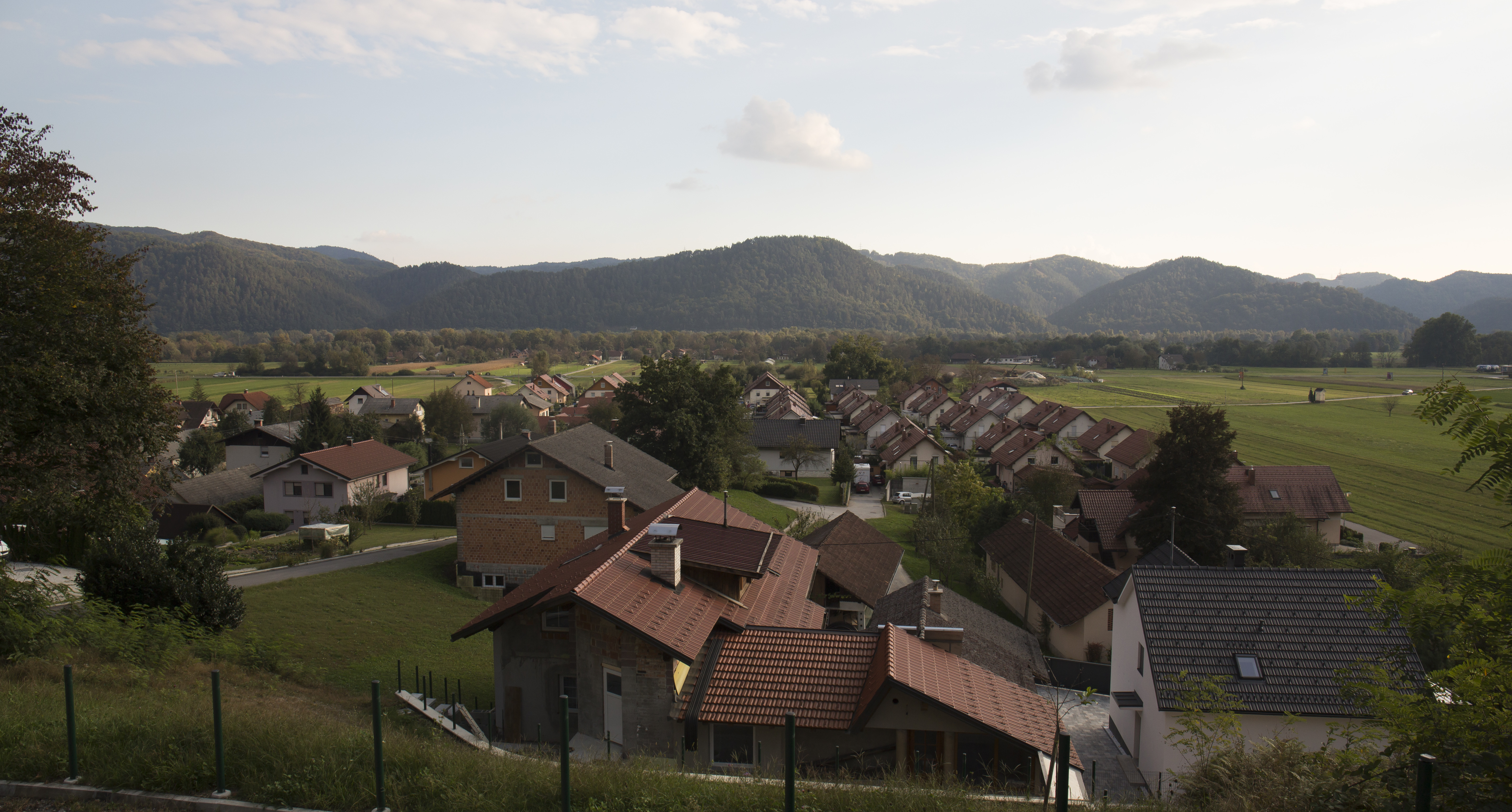

- Location in Slovenia
- Coordinates: 46°5′32.43″N 14°39′24.39″E
- Country: Slovenia
- Traditional region: Upper Carniola
- Statistical region: Central Slovenia
- Municipality: Dol pri Ljubljani

Area
  - Total: 1.07 km^{2} (0.41 sq mi)
- Elevation: 267.1 m (876 ft)

Population (2020)
  - Total: 325
  - Density: 304/km^{2} (787/sq mi)

Podgora pri Dolskem (pronounced [pɔdˈɡɔːɾa pɾi ˈdoːu̯skɛm] or [pɔdˈɡɔːɾa pɾi ˈdoːlskɛm]) is a small settlement northeast of Dolsko in the Municipality of Dol pri Ljubljani in the eastern part of the Upper Carniola region of Slovenia.

== Name ==
The name of the settlement was changed from Podgora to Podgora pri Dolskem in 1953.
