= Zaboršt pri Dolu =

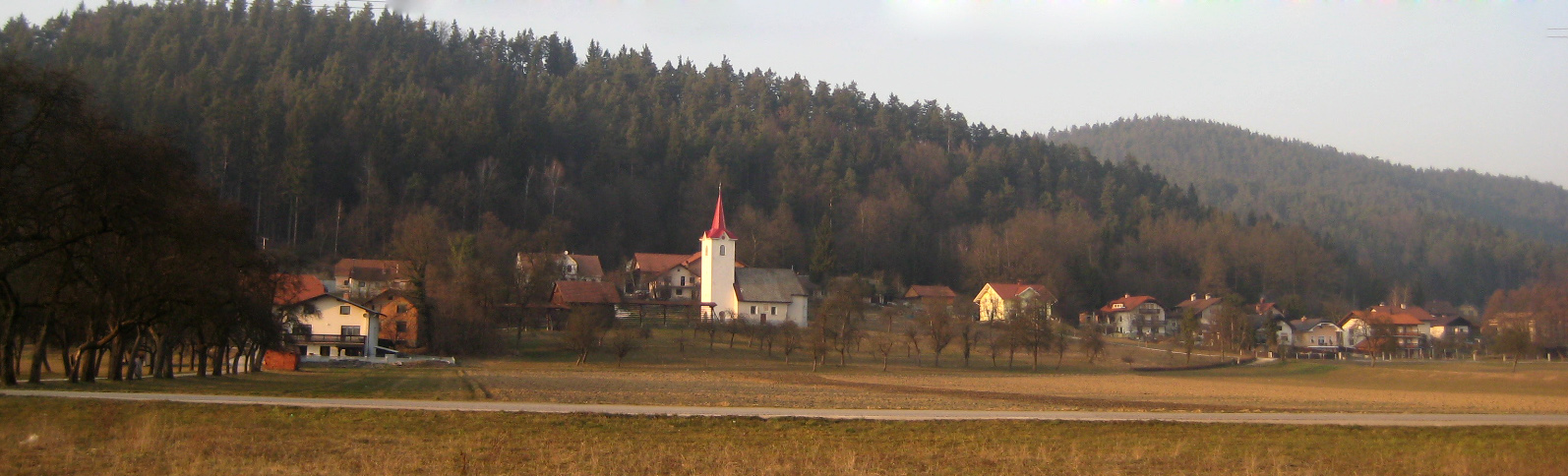

- Location in Slovenia
- Coordinates: 46°5′29.25″N 14°37′57.81″E
- Country: Slovenia
- Traditional region: Upper Carniola
- Statistical region: Central Slovenia
- Municipality: Dol pri Ljubljani

Area
  - Total: 1.78 km^{2} (0.69 sq mi)
- Elevation: 281.6 m (924 ft)

Population (2020)
  - Total: 406
  - Density: 228/km^{2} (591/sq mi)

Zaboršt pri Dolu (pronounced [zaˈbɔɾʃt pɾi ˈdoːlu]) is a settlement in the Municipality of Dol pri Ljubljani in the Upper Carniola region of Slovenia.

== Name ==
The name of the settlement was changed from Zaboršt to Zaboršt pri Dolu in 1953.

== Church ==
The local church is dedicated to Saint Catherine. A fragment of a fresco of Saint Christopher is preserved on its southern exterior wall, dating to the early 15th century. The church was rebuilt in the 17th and 18th centuries. The belfry dates to 1689.
