= Janez Janež =

Slovene medical doctor and surgeon (1913–1990)

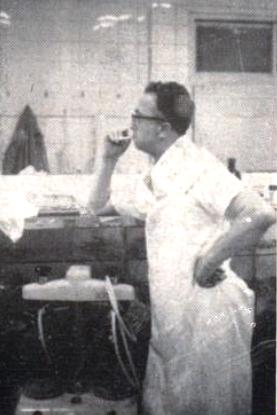
- Born: January 14, 1913; Dolsko, Slovenia
- Died: October 11, 1990 (aged 77); Luodong, Taiwan
- Occupation: Surgeon

Janez Janež (pronounced [ˈjaːnɛs ˈjaːnɛʃ]; January 14, 1913 – October 11, 1990) was a Slovene medical doctor and surgeon who worked for most of his life in mainland China and Taiwan. In Chinese he is known as Fan Fenglong (simplified Chinese: 范凤龙; traditional Chinese: 范鳳龍) or simply Doctor Fan (simplified Chinese: 范医生; traditional Chinese: 范醫生; pinyin: Fan yisheng).

He was known as Oki which means big in Japanese.

== Life and work ==
Janež was born on January 14, 1913, in Dolsko near Ljubljana, Slovenia. His parents Ana and Franc Janež had three other sons (Franc Jr., Karel, and Viktor) and one daughter (Mimi).

After graduating from a classical secondary school, his mother encouraged him to study theology. However, Janež decided to study medicine in Ljubljana, Zagreb, and Graz. He received his doctorate on May 28, 1937. Later he continued specialized studies in Belgrade and Vienna.

He began working as a surgeon at the Ljubljana hospital in 1937. He continued to work as physician and surgeon during World War II. During the war he was neither militarily nor politically active. He did not collaborate with the German or Italian forces, but after the war Yugoslav communist authorities accused him of collaborationism and put him on a death-sentence list. To save his life, he fled to a refugee camp in Carinthia, Austria. This camp was under British military command. When Yugoslavia demanded the repatriation of these refugees, British soldiers loaded them on a train, saying that they were going to Italy. However, Janež suspected that they were going in wrong direction and he fled again. Most of the people on the train were murdered without trial at Kočevje Rog and several other locations in Slovenia.

Janež spent a while hiding in Austria. In 1947 he went to Rome, Italy. There he met Ladislav Lenček, a lazarist who proposed that he go to China and help Italian missionaries as a physician. Janež decided to become a lay missionary—a Christian missionary who has not received Holy Orders, but dedicates his life in serving other people and giving them a good example of Christian love and virtues. Soon he left Italy, and after a brief stop in 1948 in Buenos Aires, Argentina he came to China.

In mainland China he worked as a medical doctor in Zhaotong (昭通, WG: Chaot'ung), Yunnan. The hospital in Zhaotong was supervised by Camillian monks from Italy and nuns from Slovenia. On his arrival, the hospital was in quite poor condition. It lacked modern equipment and the staff was not suitably qualified. Janež organized educational training of the staff and bought some modern equipment (thanks to donations made by sponsors from abroad): an X-ray machine and surgical instruments. Soon the hospital experienced a real boom and the fame of the miraculous doctor who could cure any illness began to spread among the neighboring population. During this period Janež realized that he would not be able to establish sincere contact with his patients without knowledge of the language, and so he began learning Chinese.

In 1952 the Chinese communist authorities arrested the entire hospital staff. Along with some colleagues, Janež was sentenced to death but later his sentence was changed to expulsion from the country. He moved to Taiwan, to the town of Luodong in Yilan County. He intentionally chose this small and undeveloped town because he saw that the people living there had greater need of his medical help.

The situation in the city was desperate. Taiwan had accepted many refugees from the mainland, and the people were afflicted by poverty and diseases caused by lack of hygiene. There was no hospital. The Camilian monks established a small outpatient clinic that over the years evolved into a modern hospital, now known as St. Mary's Hospital. In this hospital Janež lived and worked for the next 38 years. He worked from dawn to late evening, and he often performed 10 or more difficult operations in one day. During all this time he refused wages; he requested only a small apartment, food, and a little pocket money.

He died on October 11, 1990. He was buried on October 19 in Luodong. On the day of his burial, an enormous crowd came to Luodong to honor the memory of this great man whose entire life was a sacrifice to simple people in need.

== Honors and awards ==
Holy See:

- Order of St. Sylvester (1969)
- Order of St. Gregory the Great (1969)

The Taiwanese authorities awarded him the "Good Man" medal. In 2007, the Dr. Fan Fenglong Memorial Center (范鳳龍紀念大樓) was opened in Luodong.

== References and external links ==
- Ciglar, Tone (1993). Dr. Janez Janež - utrinek božje dobrote. Zbirka Knjižice, Katehetski center. Ljubljana.
- Dobrovc, Anica - screenplay; Hren, Slavko - director (2000). Doktor Fan na Tajvanu, videocassette. Družina Editions and TV Slovenia - Artistic Program. Ljubljana.
- Janez Janež (Slovene)
- Dr. Janez Janež (Slovene)
- Društvo dr. Janeza Janeža (Slovene)
- Dr. Fan Fenglong (Chinese)
- Fan FengLong (Chinese)
