= Kamnica, Dol pri Ljubljani =

Kamnica
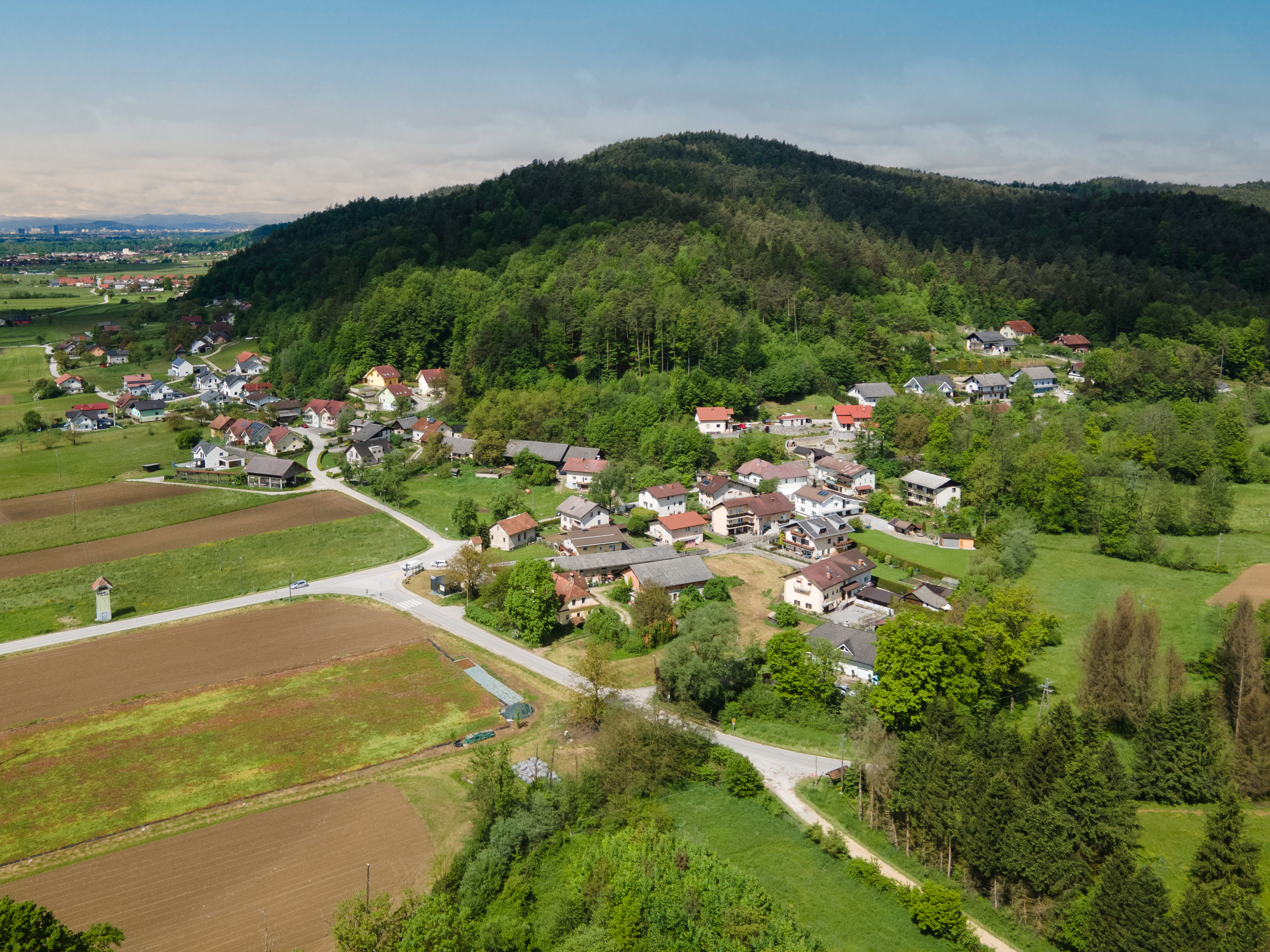

- Location in Slovenia
- Coordinates: 46°5′51.41″N 14°40′29.92″E
- Country: Slovenia
- Traditional region: Upper Carniola
- Statistical region: Central Slovenia
- Municipality: Dol pri Ljubljani

Area
  - Total: 1.09 km^{2} (0.42 sq mi)
- Elevation: 268.3 m (880 ft)

Population (2020)
  - Total: 398
  - Density: 365/km^{2} (946/sq mi)

Kamnica (pronounced [ˈkaːmnitsa]) is a settlement northeast of Ljubljana in the Municipality of Dol pri Ljubljani in the Upper Carniola region of Slovenia. It includes the hamlet of Sveta Helena.

== Name ==
Kamnica was attested in historical sources as Camenitza in 1490. Like similar toponyms (e.g., Veliki Kamen and Kamnik, as well as German Gaming), the name is derived from the Slavic common noun *kamy (accusative: *kamenь) 'stone'.

== History ==
In the past, Kamnica was known for black slate, which was mined here and used for slate roofing. It was also known for millstones. Saint Helena's Church, first mentioned in 1495, and Žerjav Castle, dating from the 16th-century, stand in the hamlet of Sveta Helena.

== Notable people ==
Notable people that were born or lived in Kamnica include:

- Josip Armič (1870–1937), teacher and writer
- Katarina Zupančič, (1860–1918), Slovenian straw plaiter and folk singer
