= Dol pri Ljubljani =

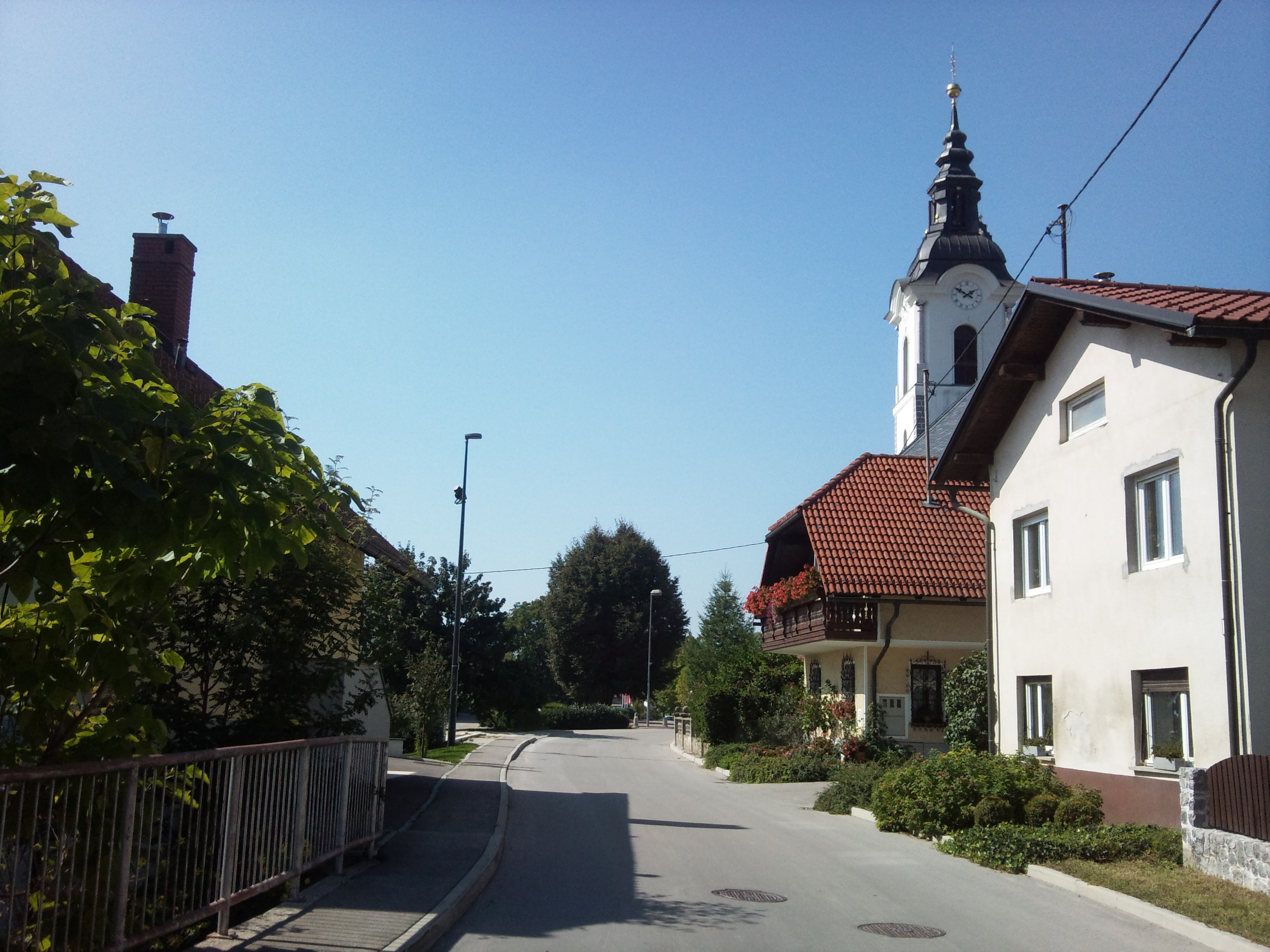

- Flag

- Location in Slovenia
- Coordinates: 46°5′18.38″N 14°38′32.92″E
- Country: Slovenia
- Traditional region: Upper Carniola
- Statistical region: Central Slovenia
- Municipality: Dol pri Ljubljani

Area
  - Total: 0.4 km^{2} (0.15 sq mi)
- Elevation: 271 m (889 ft)

Population (2020)
  - Total: 277
  - Density: 690/km^{2} (1,800/sq mi)

Dol pri Ljubljani (pronounced [ˈdoːl pɾi ljuˈbljaːni]; German: Lusttal) is a settlement in central Slovenia. It is the seat of the Municipality of Dol pri Ljubljani. It is part of the traditional region of Upper Carniola and is now included in the Central Slovenia Statistical Region.

== Geography ==
Dol pri Ljubljani is a ribbon village along the old road from Šentjakob ob Savi to Litija. It lies north of the confluence of the Kamnik Bistrica with the Sava on a gravelly terrace. Below the terrace the land slopes downwards to swampy meadows with springs, the largest of which is Manor Spring (Slovene: Graščinski studenec). The area directly along the Sava is drier. Mlinščica Creek, a tributary of the Kamnik Bistrica, flows past the southern outskirts of the village.

== Name ==
Dol pri Ljubljani (literally, 'Dol near Ljubljana') was attested in written sources in 1263 as im Tal and in 1358 as in dem Lustal. The name is derived from the Slovene common noun dol 'small valley', referring to the physical characteristics of the place.

== Dol Mansion ==
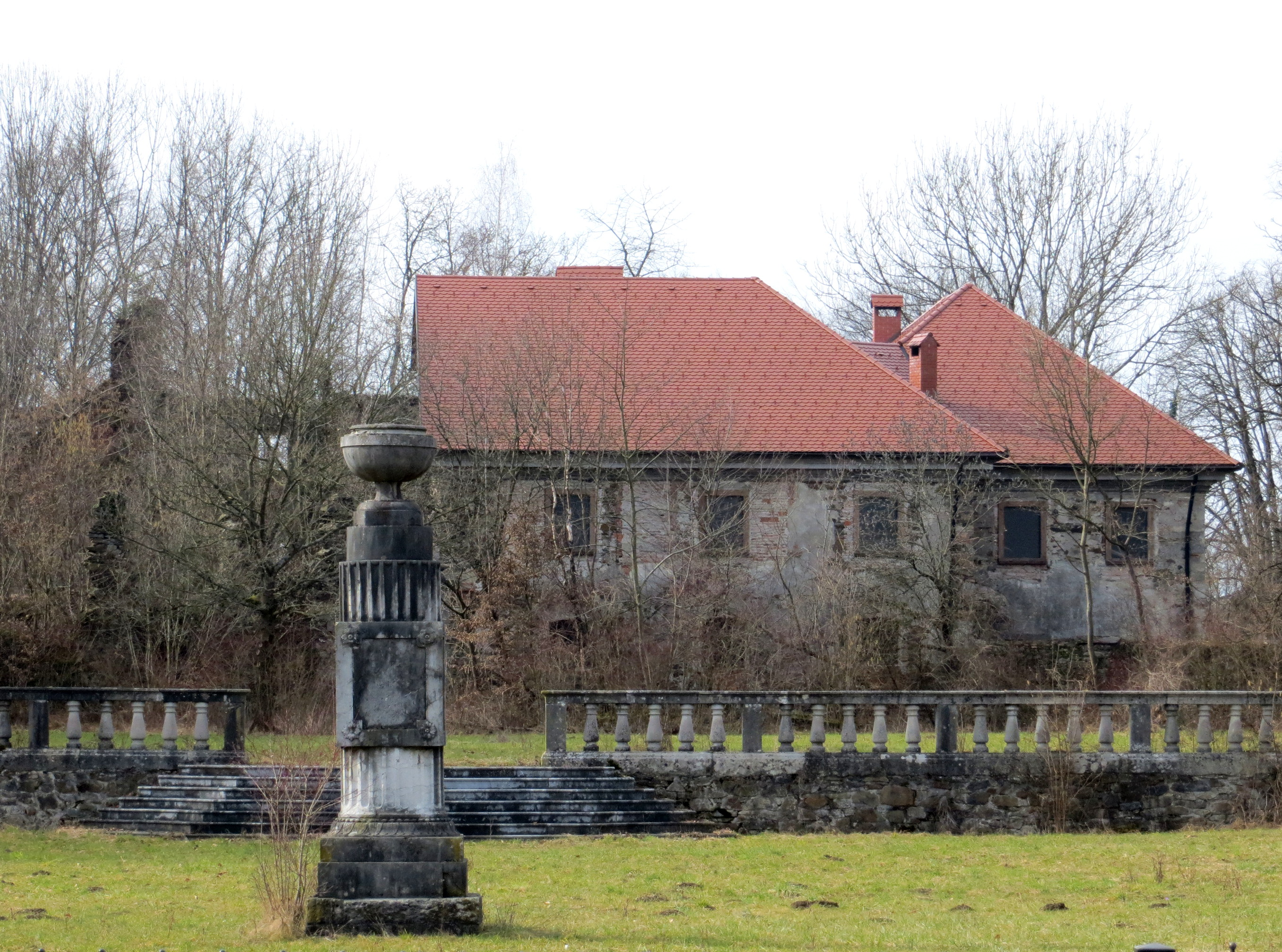
Dol Mansion

The ruins of Dol Mansion (Slovene: dvorec Dol, German: Lustthal) stand in the southeast part of the settlement. The mansion was built in 1540 by Alexander Gallenberg after he abandoned Osterberg Castle above Podgrad. The mansion was later purchased by the Rasp family, and then by Johann Daniel Erberg from Kočevje. Under a later owner, Josef Kalasanz von Erberg, the mansion was turned into a museum of natural history, technology, art, and literary history in 1808, to which a valuable library and archive were added in 1810, creating the most extensive private collection in Carniola. A botanical garden was set up around the mansion with thousands of different species, and the watercourses around it were regulated. After the death of the last member of the Erberg family, the mansion passed through various hands, and was purchased by Fran Povše in 1882. The Partisans burned the mansion in 1944.

== Church ==
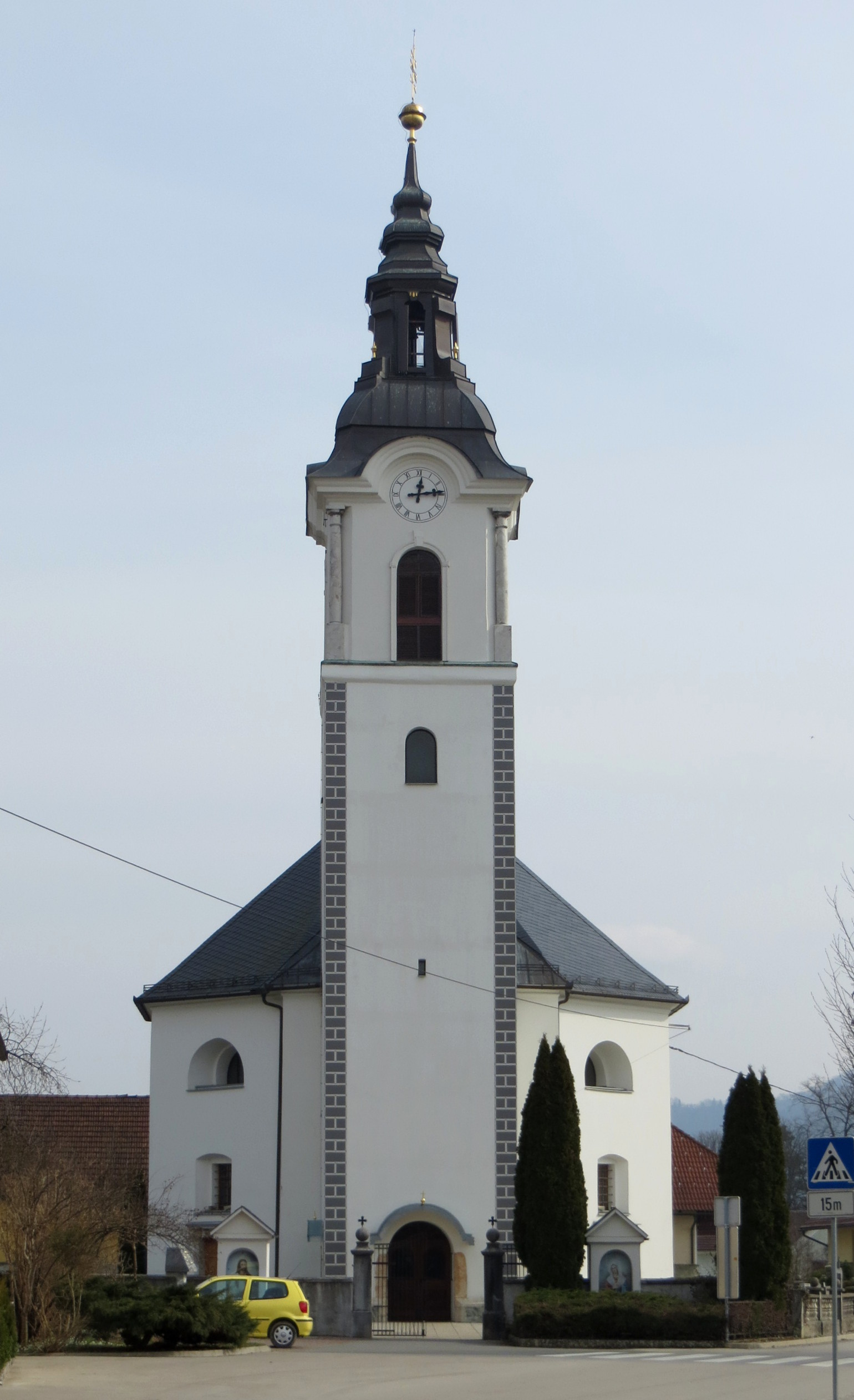
Saint Margaret's Church

The parish church in Dol pri Ljubljani is dedicated to Saint Margaret (Slovene: sveta Marjeta) and belongs to the Roman Catholic Archdiocese of Ljubljana. It was originally a Gothic church that was restyled in the Baroque in the 18th century.

== Notable people ==
Notable people that were born or lived in Dol pri Ljubljani include:

- Anton Erberg (1695–1746), religious writer
- Johann Benjamin Erberg (1699–1759), astronomer
- Andrej Fleischmann (1805–1867), botanist
- Josef Kalasanz von Erberg (1771–1843), botanist, cultural historian, collector
- Josip Klemenc (1898–1967), archaeologist
- Franc Lubej (1898–1985), politician
- Valentin Majar (1851–1938), religious writer
- Janko Moder (1914–2006), translator
