= Dolsko =

Village near Ljubljana, Slovenia

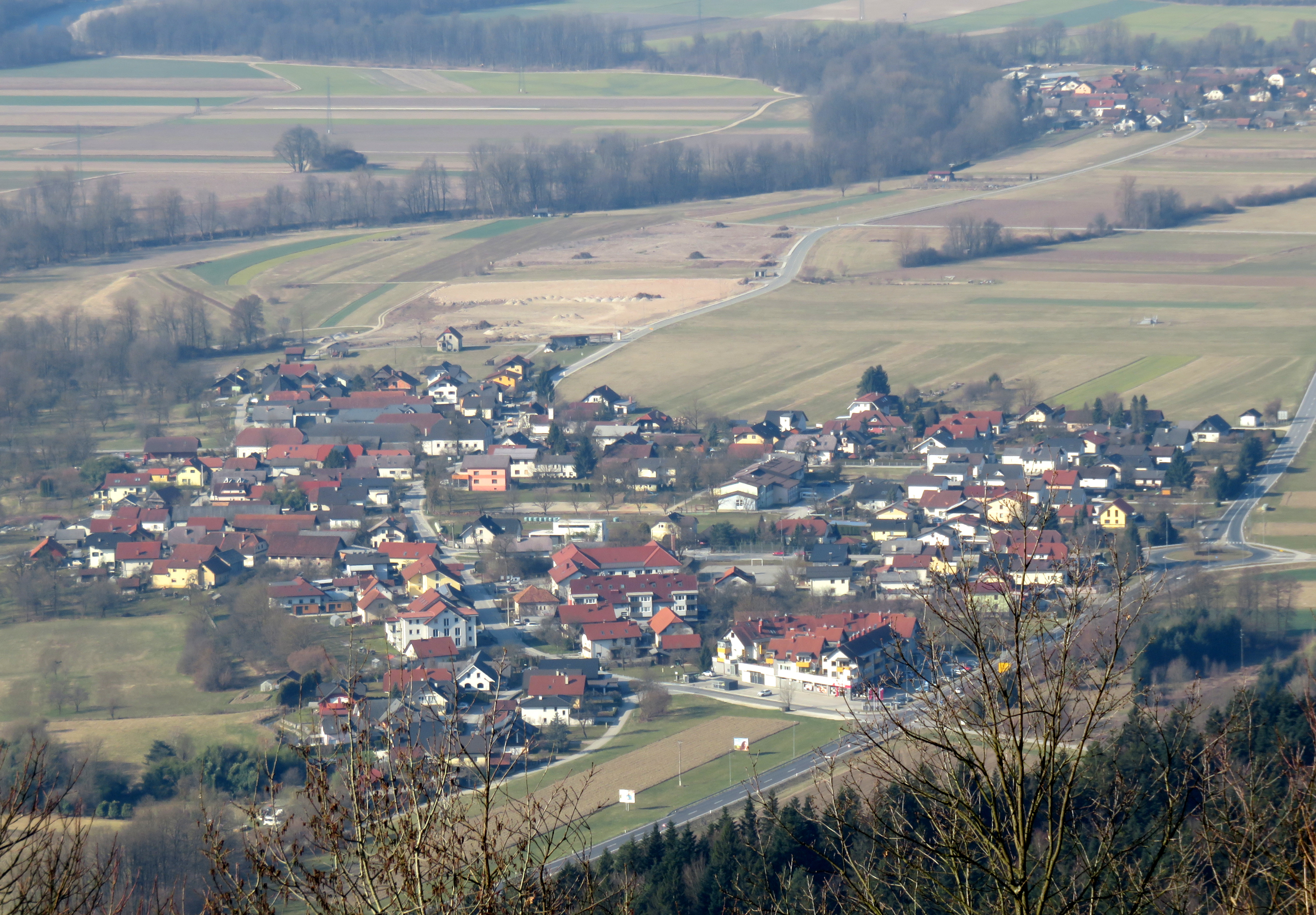

- Location in Slovenia
- Coordinates: 46°5′30.36″N 14°40′29.58″E
- Country: Slovenia
- Traditional region: Upper Carniola
- Statistical region: Central Slovenia
- Municipality: Dol pri Ljubljani

Area
  - Total: 3.58 km^{2} (1.38 sq mi)
- Elevation: 264.8 m (869 ft)

Population (2020)
  - Total: 652
  - Density: 182/km^{2} (472/sq mi)

Dolsko (pronounced [ˈdɔːu̯skɔ] or [ˈdɔːlskɔ]; in older sources also Dolško, German: Douschko) is a village 14 km northeast of Ljubljana in the Municipality of Dol pri Ljubljani in the Upper Carniola region of Slovenia.

== Geography ==
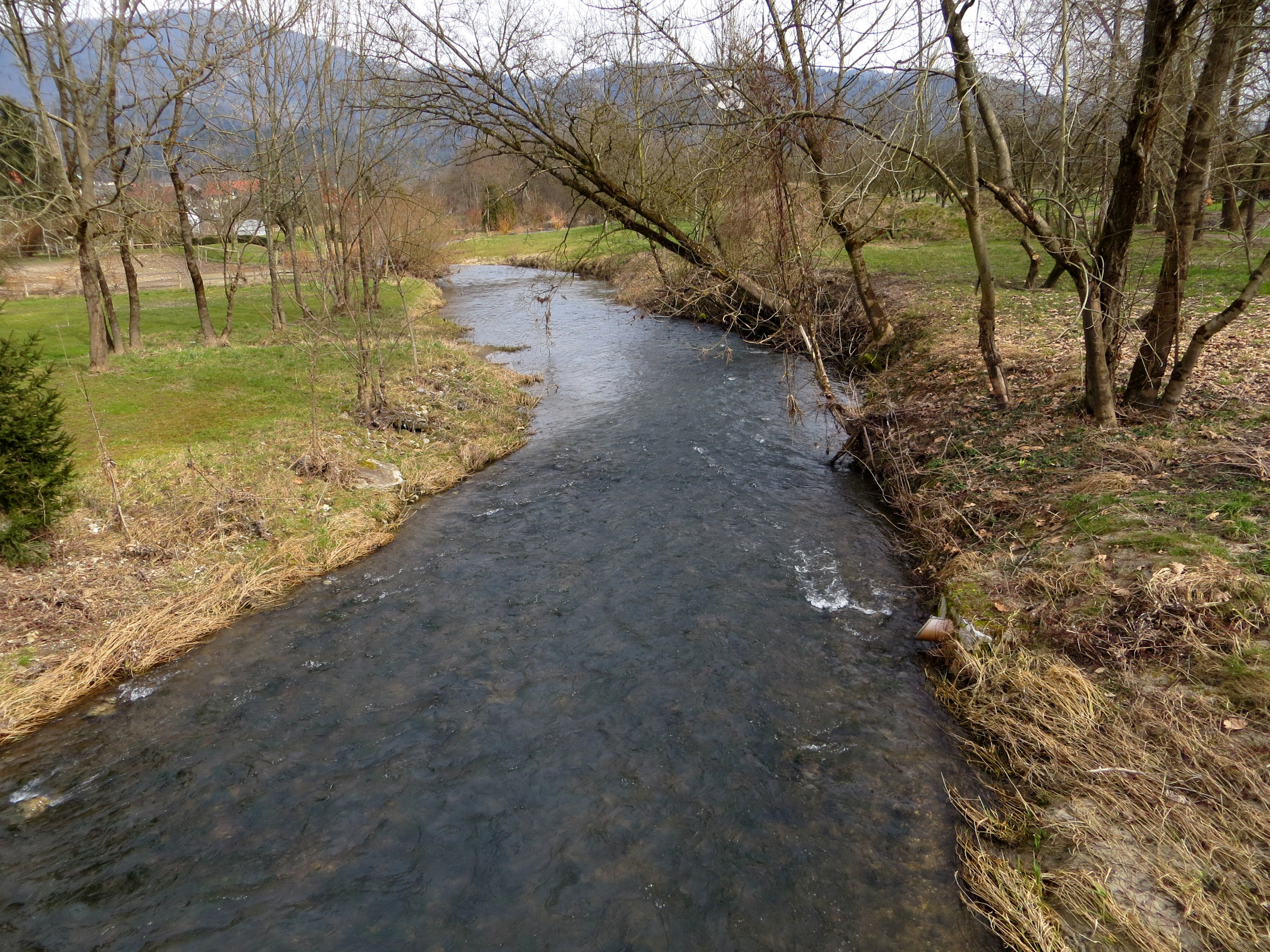
Mlinščica Creek

Dolsko lies on the edge of a terrace 2 to 3 m high above the Sava River just west of the point where the Sava leaves the relatively flat Sava Basin and enters hilly territory. Mlinščica Creek (also known locally as Mežca Creek), a tributary of the Sava, flows through the southern outskirts of the settlement. The soil is sandy and fertile.

== Name ==
Dolsko was attested in written sources in 1763–87 as Dousko. The name is derived from a clipped noun phrase, Dolsko (selo/polje) '(village/field near) Dol'. Locally, the name is pronounced Dou̯škə.

== History ==
A school was established in Dolsko in 1880, and the schoolhouse was expanded with the addition of a second floor in 1904. The cemetery east of Dolsko was formerly used to bury drowning victims taken from the Sava River.

== Church ==
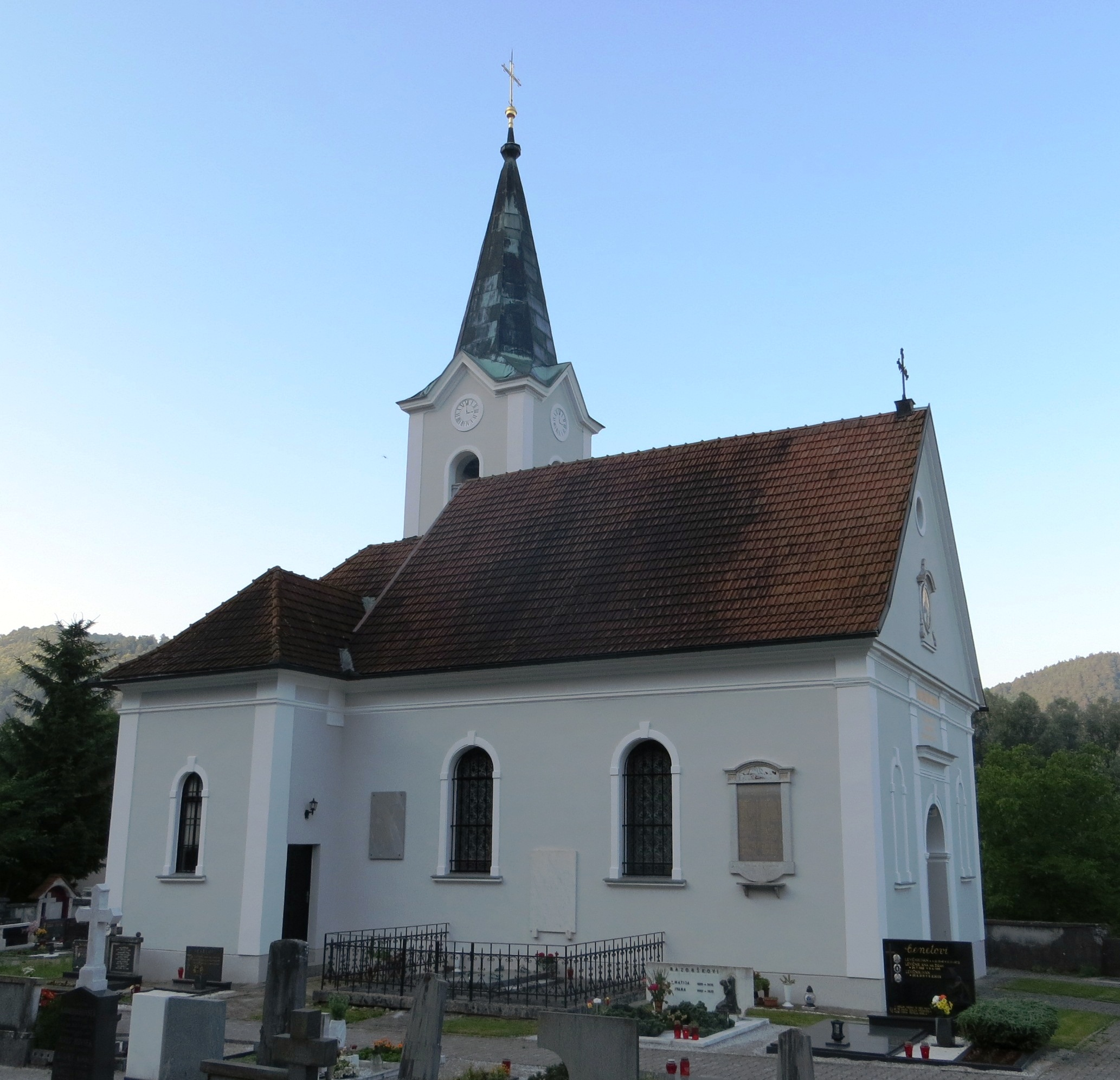
Saint Agatha's Church

The local church, built outside the settlement, is dedicated to Saint Agatha. It was formerly dedicated to Saint Thaïs (Slovene: sveta Tajda). It is located south of the road east of the village. The nave of the church is decorated with painting of the Ascension, and the church also has stained glass windows and a stone altar. The cemetery chapel dates from 1500 and was reworked several times, most extensively around 1900. The bell tower was built between 1902 and 1905. The tower contains two bells dating from the first half of the 15th century.

== Other cultural heritage ==
In addition to Saint Agatha's Church, Dolsko has a number of other sites registered as cultural heritage:

- The Spodnje Škovce archaeological site contains remnants of settlement from the Neolithic (a cave with pottery fragments, a quern, whetstones, and stone and horn tools), Chalcolithic (stone tools), Bronze Age, and 8th century (pottery and a double burial with grave goods).
- The farm at Dolsko no. 17 consists of a single-story rectangular masonry house with a cellar and half-hip roof, as well as several outbuildings. The house has a door casing with the year 1810 carved into it, fragments of a classicist facade, and a carved double door. It is located in the western part of the village.
- The farm at Dolsko no. 19 has a two-story house with a historically decorated facade and a gabled roof. There are two rows of outbuildings, a well, a smithy (now converted into a bar), and a 19th-century garden. It is located in the southern part of the settlement above Mlinščica Creek. Locally, the farm is known as the Krač Farm (Slovene: pr' Krač). In the past, it was an inn that served teamsters and river traffic.
- The Pletar chapel shrine is a rectangular structure with a central niche containing a wooden sculpture of the Virgin and Child. It is topped by a low triangular pediment and cornice. The shrine stands in the western part of the village on the north side of the road next to the fire station.
- A Roman-era cemetery in the village has been partly excavated. It was discovered at the end of the 19th century and contains 400 graves. Finds from the site are kept at the Vienna Museum of Natural History.
- The house where the medical doctor and surgeon Janez Janež (1913–1990) was born was renovated in 1996. It has a half-hipped roof and a central dormer. A plaque was unveiled on the house in 2001.
- The Sok shrine is located at the crossroads southwest of the village. It is a square masonry column dating from the last quarter of the 19th century. The upper part contains a shallow niche with a painting. It is topped by a four-sided roof with a cross.
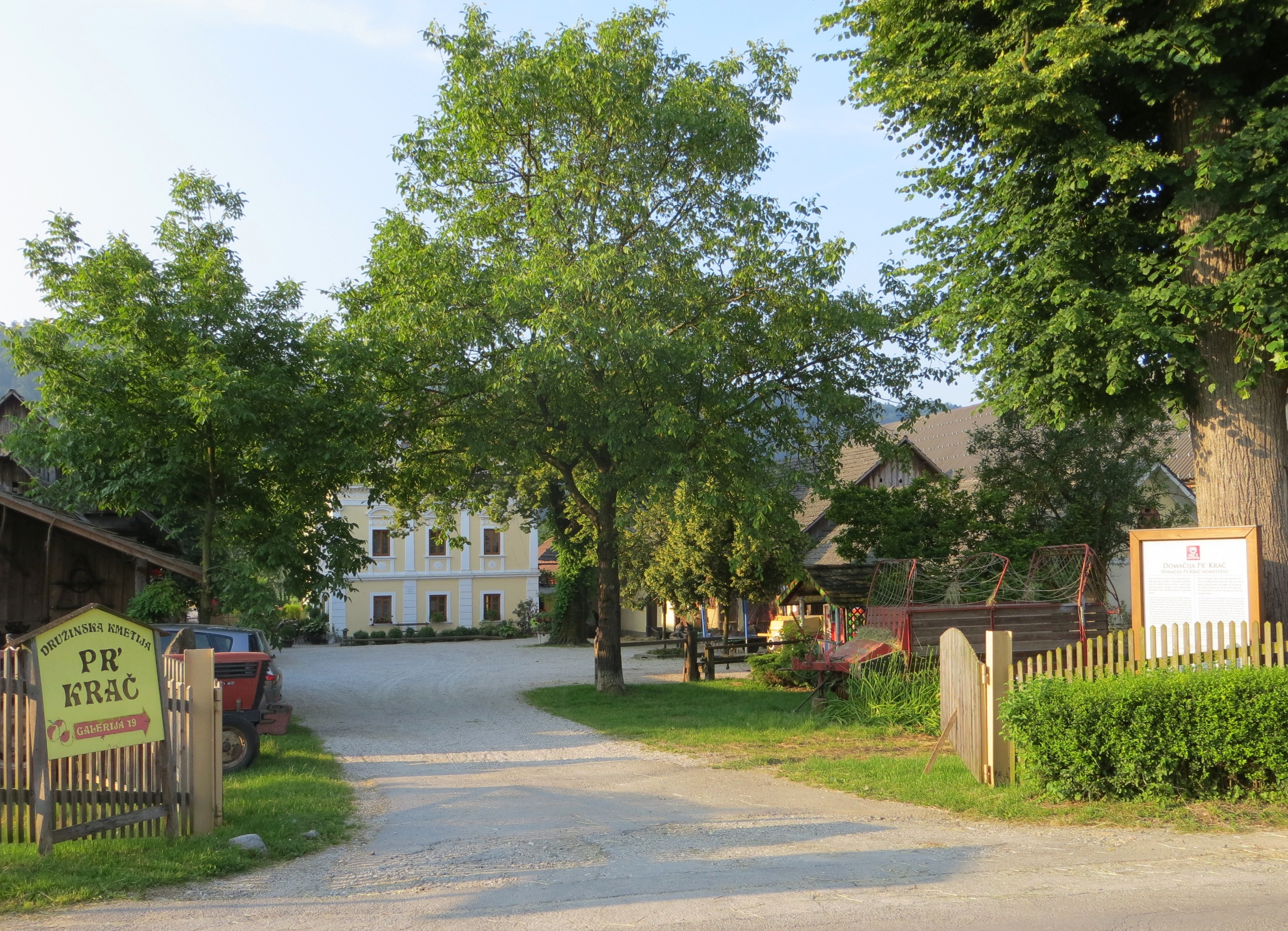
The Krač Farm

== Notable people ==
Notable people that were born or lived in Dolsko include:

- Janez Janež (1913–1990), medical doctor and surgeon
