= Ljubljana Bežigrad (National Assembly constituency) =

Constituency in Slovenia

- Constituency for the National Assembly
- Location of Ljubljana Bežigrad within Slovenia
- Municipality: List: Dobrepolje; Dol pri Ljubljani; Domžale; Grosuplje; Ivančna Gorica (part); Kočevje; Kostel; Ljubljana (part); Loški Potok; Lukovica; Mengeš; Moravče; Osilnica; Ribnica; Sodražica; Trzin
- Electorate: 210,024 (2026)

Current Constituency
- Created: 1992
- Seats: 11 (1992–present)
- Deputies: List: Maruša Babnik (SDS); Janez Beja (NSi); Ana Cajhen (D); Rado Gladek (SDS); Robert Golob (Svoboda); Vinko Levstek (SDS); Tereza Novak (Svoboda); Martin Premk (Svoboda); Nedeljko Todorović (Resni.ca); Asta Vrečko (Levica); Lenart Žavbi (Svoboda)
- Electoral districts: List: Domžale 1; Domžale 2; Grosuplje; Ivančna Gorica; Kočevje; Ljubljana Bežigrad 1; Ljubljana Bežigrad 2; Ljubljana Moste-Polje 1; Ljubljana Moste-Polje 2; Ljubljana Moste-Polje 3; Ribnica-Dobrepolje

Ljubljana Bežigrad, officially known as the 4th constituency (Slovene: 4. volilna enota), is one of the eight multi-member constituencies (electoral units) of the National Assembly, the national legislature of Slovenia. The constituency was established in 1992 following Slovenia's independence from Yugoslavia. It consists of the municipalities of Dobrepolje, Dol pri Ljubljani, Domžale, Grosuplje, Kočevje, Kostel, Loški Potok, Lukovica, Mengeš, Moravče, Osilnica, Ribnica, Sodražica and Trzin, and parts of the municipalities of Ivančna Gorica and Ljubljana. The constituency currently elects 11 of the 90 members of the National Assembly using the open party-list proportional representation electoral system. At the 2026 parliamentary election the constituency had 210,024 registered electors.

== History ==
The 4th constituency (Ljubljana Bežigrad) was one of the eight constituencies established by the Determination of Constituencies for the Election of Deputies to the National Assembly Act (ZDVEDZ) (Zakon o določitvi volilnih enot za volitve poslancev v državni zbor (ZDVEDZ)) passed by the Assembly of the Republic of Slovenia (Skupščina Republike Slovenije) in September 1992. It consisted of the municipalities of Domžale, Grosuplje, Kočevje, Litija, Ljubljana Bežigrad, Ljubljana Moste-Polje and Ribnica.

Following the re-organisation of municipalities in October 1994, parts of Domžale municipality were transferred to the newly created municipalities of Lukovica, Mengeš and Moravče; parts of Grosuplje municipality were transferred to the newly created municipalities of Dobrepolje and Ivančna Gorica; parts of Kočevje municipality were transferred to the newly created municipalities of Loški Potok and Osilnica; the municipalities of Ljubljana Bežigrad and Ljubljana Moste-Polje were transferred to the newly created municipalities of Ljubljana and Dol pri Ljubljani; and parts of Ribnica municipality were transferred to the newly created Loški Potok municipality.

In August 1998 parts of Domžale municipality were transferred to the newly created Trzin municipality; parts of Kočevje municipality were transferred to the newly created Kostel municipality; and parts of Ribnica municipality were transferred to the newly created Sodražica municipality.

The municipalities of Litija and Šmartno pri Litiji were transferred from Ljubljana Bežigrad constituency to Novo Mesto constituency in February 2021.

In February 2021 the National Assembly passed Amendments and Supplements to the Determination of Constituencies for the Election of Deputies to the National Assembly Act (ZDVEDZ-B) (Zakon o spremembah in dopolnitvah Zakona o določitvi volilnih enot za volitve poslancev v državni zbor (ZDVEDZ-B)) which defined the Ljubljana Bežigrad constituency as consisting of the municipalities of Dobrepolje, Domžale, Grosuplje, Ivančna Gorica, Kočevje, Kostel, Loški Potok, Lukovica, Mengeš, Moravče, Osilnica, Ribnica, Sodražica and Trzin, and parts of the municipality of Ljubljana.

== Electoral system ==
Ljubljana Bežigrad currently elects 11 of the 90 members of the National Assembly using the open party-list proportional representation electoral system. Each constituency is divided into 11 electoral districts (volilni okraji) in which each party stands a single candidate. Electors vote for a candidate of their choice in their electoral district and then the votes received by each party's candidates are aggregated at the constituency level.

Allocation of seats was carried out in two stages. In the first stage, seats are allocated to parties at the constituency level using the Droop quota (Hare quota prior to 2006). In the second stage, unallocated seats from the first stage are aggregated at the national level and allocated to parties using the D'Hondt method (any seats won by the party at the constituency level are subtracted from the party's national seats). Though calculated nationally, national seats are allocated at the constituency level.

Since 2000, only parties that reach the 4% national threshold compete for seats at both constituency and national levels. Prior to this there was no threshold at the constituency level but parties needed to reach 3/88 (c3.4%) to compete for seats at the national level.

Seats won by each party in a constituency are allocated to the candidates with the highest percentage of votes. As a consequence, multiple candidates may be elected from an electoral district whilst others may have no candidates elected. Prior to 2000 parties had the option to have up to 50% of their national seats allocated in the order they appear on their party list (closed list).

== Electoral districts ==
Ljubljana Bežigrad is divided into 11 electoral districts:

- 1. Kočevje - municipalities of Kočevje, Kostel and Osilnica.
- 2. Ribnica-Dobrepolje - municipalities of Dobrepolje, Loški Potok, Ribnica and Sodražica.
- 3. Grosuplje - municipality of Grosuplje.
- 4. Ivančna Gorica - municipality of Ivančna Gorica (except Pusti Javor, Radanja Vas, Sela pri Sobračah, Sobrače and Vrh pri Sobračah).
- 5. Ljubljana Moste-Polje 1 - municipalities of Dol pri Ljubljani (except Beričevo, Brinje, Dol pri Ljubljani, Kleče pri Dolu, Podgora pri Dolskem, Vdem, Zaboršt pri Dolu and Zajelše) and Ljubljana (Besnica, Brezje pri Lipoglavu, Češnjica, Dolgo Brdo, Gabrje pri Jančah, Janče, Javor, Mali Lipoglav, Mali Vrh pri Prežganju, Malo Trebeljevo, Pance, Podgrad, Podlipoglav, Podmolnik, Prežganje, Ravno Brdo, Repče, Sadinja Vas, Selo pri Pancah, Šentpavel, Tuji Grm, Veliki Lipoglav, Veliko Trebeljevo, Vnajnarje, Volavlje, Zagradišče, Zgornja Besnica and parts of Ljubljana only).
- 6. Ljubljana Moste-Polje 2 - municipality of Ljubljana (parts of Ljubljana only).
- 7. Ljubljana Moste-Polje 3 - municipality of Ljubljana (parts of Ljubljana only).
- 8. Ljubljana Bežigrad 1 - municipalities of Dol pri Ljubljani (Beričevo, Brinje, Dol pri Ljubljani, Kleče pri Dolu, Podgora pri Dolskem, Vdem, Zaboršt pri Dolu and Zajelše only) and Ljubljana (parts of Ljubljana only).
- 9. Ljubljana Bežigrad 2 - municipality of Ljubljana (parts of Ljubljana only).
- 10. Domžale 1 - municipalities of Domžale (except Dragomelj, Preserje pri Radomljah, Pšata, Rodica, Spodnje Jarše, Srednje Jarše, Zaboršt and Zgornje Jarše), Lukovica and Moravče.
- 11. Domžale 2 - municipalities of Domžale (Dragomelj, Preserje pri Radomljah, Pšata, Rodica, Spodnje Jarše, Srednje Jarše, Zaboršt, Zgornje Jarše only), Mengeš and Trzin.

== Election results ==
=== Summary ===
Election	Left Levica / ZL / TRS			Social Democrats SD / ZLSD / ZL			Freedom Movement Svoboda			Positive Slovenia PS / LZJ-PS			Liberal Democracy LDS			Let's Connect PoS / SMC			Slovenian People's SLS / SLS-SKD / SLS-SMS			Christian Democrats SKD			New Slovenia NSi			Slovenian Democrats SDS / SDSS			Slovenian Nationalists SNS		
Election	Votes	%	Seats	Votes	%	Seats	Votes	%	Seats	Votes	%	Seats	Votes	%	Seats	Votes	%	Seats	Votes	%	Seats	Votes	%	Seats	Votes	%	Seats	Votes	%	Seats	Votes	%	Seats
2026	10,595	7.09%	0	8,772	5.87%	0	43,552	29.16%	3										with NSi						12,872	8.62%	1	38,660	25.88%	3	2,789	1.87%	0
2022	8,391	5.51%	0	9,419	6.18%	0	55,818	36.64%	4							3,100	2.03%	0	with PoS						11,357	7.45%	0	32,120	21.08%	2	1,813	1.19%	0
2018	13,011	10.57%	1	9,802	7.96%	0										12,615	10.25%	1	2,594	2.11%	0				8,998	7.31%	0	29,022	23.58%	2	3,862	3.14%	0
2014	7,707	6.35%	0	6,086	5.02%	0				5,751	4.74%	0				43,556	35.90%	4	4,068	3.35%	0				7,266	5.99%	0	25,217	20.79%	2	2,096	1.73%	0
2011	2,579	1.67%	0	13,750	8.88%	1				59,223	38.24%	4	1,606	1.04%	0				7,097	4.58%	0				8,103	5.23%	0	37,418	24.16%	2	1,975	1.28%	0
2008				49,895	33.95%	4							6,733	4.58%	0				4,078	2.78%	0	628	0.43%	0	4,786	3.26%	0	43,401	29.53%	3	6,191	4.21%	0
2004				14,682	11.08%	1							33,988	25.64%	3				6,053	4.57%	0				12,666	9.55%	1	41,065	30.98%	3	7,134	5.38%	0
2000				19,375	13.14%	1							56,083	38.05%	4				10,369	7.03%	0	with SLS			12,741	8.64%	1	26,919	18.26%	2	7,308	4.96%	0
1996				15,771	10.86%	1							40,785	28.08%	3				23,580	16.23%	1	12,581	8.66%	0				28,649	19.72%	2	4,988	3.43%	0
1992				20,186	13.04%	1							34,836	22.50%	2				10,587	6.84%	0	22,475	14.52%	1				6,421	4.15%	0	19,974	12.90%	1

(Excludes national seats. Figures in italics represent alliances/joint lists.)

=== Detailed ===
Party has received at least 4% of the vote nationally (since 2000).

==== 2020s ====
===== 2026 =====
Results of the 2026 parliamentary election held on 22 March 2026:

Party		Votes per electoral district											Total votes	%	Seats		
Party		Domžale 1	Domžale 2	Grosuplje	Ivančna Gorica	Kočevje	Ljubljana Bežigrad 1	Ljubljana Bežigrad 2	Ljubljana Moste- Polje 1	Ljubljana Moste- Polje 2	Ljubljana Moste- Polje 3	Ribnica- Dobrepolje	Total votes	%	Con.	Nat.	Tot.
Freedom Movement	Svoboda	5,090	5,614	2,720	1,882	2,398	5,825	4,843	5,232	3,668	4,632	1,648	43,552	29.16%	3	1	4
Slovenian Democratic Party	SDS	5,085	3,916	4,672	4,593	1,985	3,504	2,349	4,227	1,441	2,563	4,325	38,660	25.88%	3	0	3
New Slovenia – Christian Democrats, Slovenian People's Party and Focus	NSi-SLS- FOKUS	2,293	1,599	1,160	1,015	478	1,420	818	1,361	461	775	1,492	12,872	8.62%	1	0	1
The Left and Vesna – Green Party	Levica-Vesna	844	987	595	325	313	1,685	2,136	1,120	954	1,319	317	10,595	7.09%	0	1	1
Democrats	D	1,523	1,256	867	659	363	1,229	880	1,049	479	837	915	10,057	6.73%	0	1	1
Social Democrats	SD	1,068	1,042	569	569	754	1,104	919	907	689	789	362	8,772	5.87%	0	0	0
Resni.ca	Resni.ca	927	911	553	438	486	835	686	1,049	725	842	381	7,833	5.24%	0	1	1
Prerod	Prerod	670	713	418	293	1,483	667	590	588	319	450	548	6,739	4.51%	0	0	0
Pirate Party	Pirati	556	562	304	234	118	571	590	526	362	490	164	4,477	3.00%	0	0	0
Slovenian National Party	SNS	532	375	194	196	156	246	209	300	154	210	217	2,789	1.87%	0	0	0
We, Socialists!	MI!	72	77	53	36	36	98	143	70	91	112	30	818	0.55%	0	0	0
Alternative for Slovenia	AzaS	67	95	65	33	30	84	61	104	40	67	31	677	0.45%	0	0	0
Greens of Slovenia and Party of Generations	ZS-SG	55	64	33	27	13	48	49	41	25	47	38	440	0.29%	0	0	0
Voice of Pensioners	GU	63	56	25	26	22	32	41	47	42	54	26	434	0.29%	0	0	0
Karl Erjavec - Trust Party	SZ	43	33	22	50	49	28	39	40	30	53	15	402	0.27%	0	0	0
Unity	Sloga	14	16	10	6	116	13	11	15	14	20	16	251	0.17%	0	0	0
Valid votes		18,902	17,316	12,260	10,382	8,800	17,389	14,364	16,676	9,494	13,260	10,525	149,368	100.00%	7	4	11
Rejected votes		167	102	90	81	89	132	106	146	118	136	103	1,270	0.84%			
Total polled		19,069	17,418	12,350	10,463	8,889	17,521	14,470	16,822	9,612	13,396	10,628	150,638	71.72%			
Registered electors		25,055	23,001	16,349	13,429	14,084	23,582	21,617	23,424	14,854	20,004	14,625	210,024				
Turnout		76.11%	75.73%	75.54%	77.91%	63.11%	74.30%	66.94%	71.82%	64.71%	66.97%	72.67%	71.72%				

The following candidates were elected:

- Constituency seats - Janez Cigler Kralj (NSi-SLS-FOKUS, Ribnica-Dobrepolje), 1,492 votes; Rado Gladek (SDS, Domžale 1), 5,085 votes; Janez Janša (SDS, Grosuplje & Ivančna Gorica), 9,265 votes; Vinko Levstek (SDS, Ribnica-Dobrepolje), 4,325 votes; Tereza Novak (Svoboda, Bežigrad 2), 4,843 votes; Martin Premk (Svoboda, Moste-Polje 3), 4,632 votes; and Lenart Žavbi (Svoboda, Moste-Polje 2), 3,668 votes.
- National seats - Robert Golob (Svoboda, Bežigrad 1 & Domžale 2), 11,439 votes; Barbara Levstik Šega (D, Ribnica-Dobrepolje), 915 votes; Nedeljko Todorović (Resni.ca, Moste Polje 2), 725 votes; and Asta Vrečko (Levica-Vesna, Bežigrad 2), 2,136 votes.

Substitutions:

- Janez Janša (SDS, Grosuplje & Ivančna Gorica) forfeited his seat on 22 May 2026 upon being elected Prime Minister and was replaced by Maruša Babnik (SDS, Moste-Polje 1) on 26 May 2026.
- Janez Cigler Kralj (NSi-SLS-FOKUS, Ribnica-Dobrepolje) forfeited his seat on 4 June 2026 upon being elected to the government and was replaced by Janez Beja (NSi-SLS-FOKUS, Domžale 1) on 9 June 2026.
- Barbara Levstik Šega (D, Ribnica-Dobrepolje) forfeited her seat on 10 June 2026 upon being appointed to the government and was replaced by Ana Cajhen (D, Domžale 2) on 15 June 2026.

===== 2022 =====
Results of the 2022 parliamentary election held on 24 April 2022:

Party		Votes per electoral district											Total votes	%	Seats		
Party		Domžale 1	Domžale 2	Grosuplje	Ivančna Gorica	Kočevje	Ljubljana Bežigrad 1	Ljubljana Bežigrad 2	Ljubljana Moste- Polje 1	Ljubljana Moste- Polje 2	Ljubljana Moste- Polje 3	Ribnica- Dobrepolje	Total votes	%	Con.	Nat.	Tot.
Freedom Movement	Svoboda	6,595	6,965	3,726	2,560	3,196	7,321	6,319	6,661	4,433	5,743	2,299	55,818	36.64%	4	1	5
Slovenian Democratic Party	SDS	3,972	3,004	3,871	3,921	1,806	3,055	2,072	3,424	1,297	2,124	3,574	32,120	21.08%	2	1	3
New Slovenia – Christian Democrats	NSi	1,963	1,278	928	709	550	1,182	705	1,109	358	730	1,845	11,357	7.45%	0	1	1
Social Democrats	SD	921	970	516	453	1,242	1,163	997	1,029	776	978	374	9,419	6.18%	0	1	1
The Left	Levica	597	778	469	311	307	1,230	1,573	886	808	1,162	270	8,391	5.51%	0	1	1
List of Marjan Šarec	LMŠ	1,426	1,364	411	348	248	809	728	794	428	595	291	7,442	4.88%	0	0	0
Party of Alenka Bratušek	SAB	465	552	238	151	281	631	542	480	429	489	177	4,435	2.91%	0	0	0
Resni.ca		420	428	229	173	289	396	294	406	250	376	175	3,436	2.26%	0	0	0
Our Future and Good Country	SNP-DD	333	319	184	151	168	285	323	410	442	339	199	3,153	2.07%	0	0	0
Let's Connect Slovenia	PoS	429	311	345	285	112	337	281	336	163	261	240	3,100	2.03%	0	0	0
Pirate Party		411	388	189	157	96	371	407	352	180	302	132	2,985	1.96%	0	0	0
For a Healthy Society	ZSi	287	342	273	160	110	295	246	278	178	242	177	2,588	1.70%	0	0	0
Vesna – Green Party		367	274	202	135	76	321	304	270	160	228	107	2,444	1.60%	0	0	0
Slovenian National Party	SNS	302	181	127	114	226	175	122	202	87	122	155	1,813	1.19%	0	0	0
Our Country		216	135	111	222	57	116	83	126	50	69	151	1,336	0.88%	0	0	0
For the People of Slovenia	ZLS	138	109	71	48	52	87	87	159	81	98	48	978	0.64%	0	0	0
Democratic Party of Pensioners of Slovenia	DeSUS	81	81	64	57	67	72	53	60	64	88	49	736	0.48%	0	0	0
List of Boris Popovič – Let's Digitize Slovenia	LBP	59	67	24	23	48	53	44	58	61	60	26	523	0.34%	0	0	0
Homeland League	DOM	32	32	31	23	11	33	31	23	17	31	12	276	0.18%	0	0	0
Valid votes		19,014	17,578	12,009	10,001	8,942	17,932	15,211	17,063	10,262	14,037	10,301	152,350	100.00%	6	5	11
Rejected votes		165	101	74	93	101	100	89	132	87	112	109	1,163	0.76%			
Total polled		19,179	17,679	12,083	10,094	9,043	18,032	15,300	17,195	10,349	14,149	10,410	153,513	73.63%			
Registered electors		24,506	22,805	15,897	13,132	14,210	23,372	21,134	23,329	15,339	20,250	14,529	208,503				
Turnout		78.26%	77.52%	76.01%	76.87%	63.64%	77.15%	72.40%	73.71%	67.47%	69.87%	71.65%	73.63%				

The following candidates were elected:

- Constituency seats - Mirjam Bon Klanjšček (Svoboda, Bežigrad 1), 7,321 votes; Miroslav Gregorič (Svoboda, Moste-Polje 2), 4,433 votes; Janez Janša (SDS, Grosuplje & Ivančna Gorica), 7,792 votes; Tereza Novak (Svoboda, Bežigrad 2), 6,319 votes; Martin Premk (Svoboda, Moste-Polje 3), 5,743 votes; and Jože Tanko (SDS, Ribnica-Dobrepolje), 3,574 votes.
- National seats - Predrag Baković (SD, Kočevje, 1,242 votes; Rado Gladek (SDS, Domžale 1), 3,972 votes; Janez Cigler Kralj (NSi, Domžale 1 & Ribnica-Dobrepolje), 3,808 votes; Monika Pekošak (Svoboda, Domžale 2), 6,965 votes; and Nataša Sukič (Levica, Bežigrad 2), 1,573 votes.

Substitutions:

- Monika Pekošak (Svoboda, Domžale 2) resigned on 26 April 2024 and was replaced by Branko Zlobko (Svoboda, Kočevje) on 23 May 2024.
- Branko Zlobko (Svoboda, Kočevje) forfeited his seat on 21 November 2025 upon being elected to the government and was replaced by Mateja Zupan Josipović (Svoboda, Domžale 1) on 1 December 2025.

==== 2010s ====
===== 2018 =====
Results of the 2018 parliamentary election held on 3 June 2018:

Party		Votes per electoral district											Total votes	%	Seats		
Party		Domžale 1	Domžale 2	Grosuplje	Litija	Kočevje	Ljubljana Bežigrad 1	Ljubljana Bežigrad 2	Ljubljana Moste- Polje 1	Ljubljana Moste- Polje 2	Ljubljana Moste- Polje 3	Ribnica	Total votes	%	Con.	Nat.	Tot.
Slovenian Democratic Party	SDS	3,006	2,589	7,020	2,488	1,084	2,816	1,921	2,955	1,088	1,895	2,160	29,022	23.58%	2	1	3
List of Marjan Šarec	LMŠ	3,522	3,026	2,082	1,634	1,001	1,885	1,301	2,083	1,052	1,432	802	19,820	16.10%	1	1	2
The Left	Levica	813	1,169	1,107	781	472	1,860	2,352	1,359	1,291	1,515	292	13,011	10.57%	1	1	2
Modern Centre Party	SMC	1,163	1,452	1,661	766	586	1,738	1,580	1,361	806	1,183	319	12,615	10.25%	1	0	1
Social Democrats	SD	886	952	1,018	676	989	1,252	1,020	936	735	951	387	9,802	7.96%	0	1	1
New Slovenia – Christian Democrats	NSi	1,668	1,013	1,365	508	294	958	538	908	352	602	792	8,998	7.31%	0	1	1
Party of Alenka Bratušek	SAB	646	767	642	313	221	954	770	651	511	718	164	6,357	5.17%	0	1	1
Democratic Party of Pensioners of Slovenia	DeSUS	370	472	532	461	442	609	580	625	735	695	118	5,639	4.58%	0	0	0
Slovenian National Party	SNS	462	387	491	337	477	295	259	406	183	272	293	3,862	3.14%	0	0	0
Pirate Party		357	337	376	158	96	431	454	322	215	339	101	3,186	2.59%	0	0	0
Slovenian People's Party	SLS	224	110	576	750	89	81	44	170	36	68	446	2,594	2.11%	0	0	0
Good Country	DD	127	226	242	96	41	481	200	157	110	162	56	1,898	1.54%	0	0	0
United Left and Unity	ZLS	35	41	75	36	562	81	52	70	37	68	167	1,224	0.99%	0	0	0
List of Journalist Bojan Požar	LNBP	99	121	137	40	46	155	115	89	76	104	62	1,044	0.85%	0	0	0
Andrej Čuš and Greens of Slovenia	AČZS	178	129	111	59	27	66	73	102	66	64	56	931	0.76%	0	0	0
For a Healthy Society	ZD	93	84	128	47	19	95	91	72	53	79	36	797	0.65%	0	0	0
Movement Together Forward	GSN	47	48	64	25	11	81	54	92	62	67	26	577	0.47%	0	0	0
United Slovenia	ZSi	64	47	61	67	33	31	42	49	23	41	40	498	0.40%	0	0	0
Economic Active Party	GAS	34	40	61	10	15	59	46	37	28	22	20	372	0.30%	0	0	0
Solidarity–For a Fair Society!		23	29	37	12	21	27	28	34	21	30	18	280	0.23%	0	0	0
Socialist Party of Slovenia	SPS	26	11	35	16	17	31	31	28	12	35	12	254	0.21%	0	0	0
Party of Slovenian People	SSN	15	19	22	22	9	11	5	21	8	20	12	164	0.13%	0	0	0
United Right		20	7	19	12	8	12	11	11	5	13	11	129	0.10%	0	0	0
Valid votes		13,878	13,076	17,862	9,314	6,560	14,009	11,567	12,538	7,505	10,375	6,390	123,074	100.00%	5	6	11
Rejected votes		142	124	192	121	96	123	97	138	62	119	98	1,312	1.05%			
Total polled		14,020	13,200	18,054	9,435	6,656	14,132	11,664	12,676	7,567	10,494	6,488	124,386	54.90%			
Registered electors		23,993	22,460	31,591	17,327	14,548	23,530	21,535	23,264	15,981	20,726	11,611	226,566				
Turnout		58.43%	58.77%	57.15%	54.45%	45.75%	60.06%	54.16%	54.49%	47.35%	50.63%	55.88%	54.90%				

The following candidates were elected:

- Constituency seats - Milan Brglez (SMC, Bežigrad 2), 1,580 votes; Tina Heferle (LMŠ, Domžale 1), 3,522 votes; Janez Janša (SDS, Grosuplje), 7,020 votes; Luka Mesec (Levica, Bežigrad 2 & Moste-Polje 2), 3,643 votes; and Jože Tanko (SDS, Ribnica), 2,160 votes.
- National seats - Predrag Baković (SD, Kočevje), 989 votes; Boris Doblekar (SDS, Litija), 2,488 votes; Brane Golubović (LMŠ, Domžale 2), 3,026 votes; Ljudmila Novak (NSi, Domžale 1 & Ribnica), 2,460 votes; Vojko Starović (SAB, Moste-Polje 3), 718 votes; and Nataša Sukič (Levica, Bežigrad 1 & Moste-Polje 3), 3,375 votes.

Substitutions:

- Milan Brglez (SMC, Bežigrad 2) forfeited his seat on 2 July 2019 upon being elected to the European Parliament and was replaced by Dušan Verbič (SMC, Bežigrad 1) on 9 July 2019.
- Ljudmila Novak (NSi, Domžale 1 & Ribnica) forfeited her seat on 2 July 2019 upon being elected to the European Parliament and was replaced by Tadeja Šuštar (NSi, Domžale 2) on 9 July 2019.
- Janez Janša (SDS, Grosuplje) forfeited his seat on 3 March 2020 upon being elected Prime Minister and was replaced by Janez Moškrič (SDS, Moste-Polje 1) on 5 March 2020.

===== 2014 =====
Results of the 2014 parliamentary election held on 13 July 2014:

Party		Votes per electoral district											Total votes	%	Seats		
Party		Domžale 1	Domžale 2	Grosuplje	Litija	Kočevje	Ljubljana Bežigrad 1	Ljubljana Bežigrad 2	Ljubljana Moste- Polje 1	Ljubljana Moste- Polje 2	Ljubljana Moste- Polje 3	Ribnica	Total votes	%	Con.	Nat.	Tot.
Modern Centre Party	SMC	4,596	4,957	5,425	2,962	2,452	5,479	4,752	4,473	3,001	3,927	1,532	43,556	35.90%	4	0	4
Slovenian Democratic Party	SDS	2,695	2,267	6,116	1,936	881	2,469	1,734	2,548	920	1,676	1,975	25,217	20.79%	2	0	2
Democratic Party of Pensioners of Slovenia	DeSUS	1,111	1,116	1,037	831	739	994	897	955	779	905	397	9,761	8.05%	0	1	1
United Left	ZL	641	810	673	465	275	1,059	1,210	793	755	814	212	7,707	6.35%	0	1	1
New Slovenia – Christian Democrats	NSi	1,284	816	1,153	356	342	801	462	715	282	420	635	7,266	5.99%	0	1	1
Social Democrats	SD	491	452	501	317	1,201	744	774	486	424	511	185	6,086	5.02%	0	1	1
Positive Slovenia	PS	327	438	361	300	291	634	828	773	849	857	93	5,751	4.74%	0	0	0
Alliance of Alenka Bratušek	ZaAB	565	551	485	334	232	748	701	501	396	555	176	5,244	4.32%	0	1	1
Slovenian People's Party	SLS	445	216	660	1,078	136	191	123	298	78	168	675	4,068	3.35%	0	0	0
Slovenian National Party	SNS	311	230	265	227	179	169	144	214	95	141	121	2,096	1.73%	0	0	0
Pirate Party		241	241	204	89	0	220	267	316	119	300	58	2,055	1.69%	0	0	0
Verjamem		86	111	90	68	56	89	90	86	76	71	25	848	0.70%	0	0	0
Civic List	DL	108	84	74	48	10	90	67	63	37	42	13	636	0.52%	0	0	0
Greens of Slovenia	ZS	71	44	73	34	27	66	60	70	38	44	27	554	0.46%	0	0	0
Equal Land–Forward Slovenia	ED-NPS	33	0	30	20	20	28	29	39	18	17	18	252	0.21%	0	0	0
Economically Liberal Party	LGS	21	26	48	10	14	16	21	21	9	21	9	216	0.18%	0	0	0
Valid votes		13,026	12,359	17,195	9,075	6,855	13,797	12,159	12,351	7,876	10,469	6,151	121,313	100.00%	6	5	11
Rejected votes		188	126	210	130	80	146	127	149	99	138	88	1,481	1.21%			
Total polled		13,214	12,485	17,405	9,205	6,935	13,943	12,286	12,500	7,975	10,607	6,239	122,794	54.55%			
Registered electors		23,341	21,803	30,991	17,037	14,877	23,427	22,039	22,703	16,463	20,748	11,659	225,088				
Turnout		56.61%	57.26%	56.16%	54.03%	46.62%	59.52%	55.75%	55.06%	48.44%	51.12%	53.51%	54.55%				

The following candidates were elected:

- Constituency seats - Milan Brglez (SMC, Bežigrad 2), 4,752 votes; Bojan Dobovšek (SMC Bežigrad 1), 5,479 votes; Janez Janša (SDS, Grosuplje), 6,116 votes; Dragan Matić (SMC, Moste-Polje 2), 3,001 votes; Kamal Izidor Shaker (SMC, Domžale 2), 4,957 votes; and Jože Tanko (SDS, Ribnica), 1,975 votes.
- National seats - Matjaž Hanžek (ZL, Bežigrad 2), 1,210 votes; Marinka Levičar (DeSUS, Kočevje), 739 votes; Jani Möderndorfer (ZaAB, Bežigrad 2), 701 votes; Ljudmila Novak (NSi, Domžale 1 & Ribnica), 1,919 votes; and Janko Veber (SD, Kočevje), 1,201 votes.

Substitutions:

- Janko Veber (SD, Kočevje) forfeited his seat on 18 September 2014 upon being elected to the government and was replaced by Franc Križanič (SD, Bežigrad 1) on 30 September 2014.
- Janez Janša (SDS, Grosuplje) forfeited his seat on 15 October 2014 upon being imprisoned for corruption but was re-instated on 21 November 2014 following a complaint filed at the Constitutional Court.
- Franc Križanič (SD, Bežigrad 1) forfeited his seat on 9 April 2015 when Janko Veber (SD, Kočevje) lost his government position, regaining his seat.

===== 2011 =====
Results of the 2011 parliamentary election held on 4 December 2011:

Party		Votes per electoral district											Total votes	%	Seats		
Party		Domžale 1	Domžale 2	Grosuplje	Litija	Kočevje	Ljubljana Bežigrad 1	Ljubljana Bežigrad 2	Ljubljana Moste- Polje 1	Ljubljana Moste- Polje 2	Ljubljana Moste- Polje 3	Ribnica	Total votes	%	Con.	Nat.	Tot.
Zoran Janković's List – Positive Slovenia	LZJ-PS	4,938	6,108	4,880	3,346	3,007	7,496	7,515	6,679	6,522	7,210	1,522	59,223	38.24%	4	1	5
Slovenian Democratic Party	SDS	3,802	3,163	9,696	3,126	1,452	3,363	2,449	3,648	1,459	2,437	2,823	37,418	24.16%	2	1	3
Social Democrats	SD	1,281	1,371	1,253	869	1,852	1,664	1,700	1,176	903	1,219	462	13,750	8.88%	1	0	1
Gregor Virant's Civic List	LGV	1,872	1,378	1,354	748	742	1,241	985	1,127	611	819	615	11,492	7.42%	0	1	1
New Slovenia – Christian People's Party	NSi	1,454	960	1,104	477	264	885	473	803	350	506	827	8,103	5.23%	0	1	1
Democratic Party of Pensioners of Slovenia	DeSUS	819	900	889	690	664	746	629	798	600	618	310	7,663	4.95%	0	0	0
Slovenian People's Party	SLS	994	619	1,107	1,278	325	575	325	762	213	380	519	7,097	4.58%	0	0	0
Party for Sustainable; Development of Slovenia	TRS	196	268	244	89	94	395	395	267	295	285	51	2,579	1.67%	0	0	0
Slovenian National Party	SNS	235	176	271	226	181	184	146	187	118	140	111	1,975	1.28%	0	0	0
Liberal Democracy of Slovenia	LDS	206	155	213	122	86	182	179	124	117	164	58	1,606	1.04%	0	0	0
Zares		44	47	85	172	212	57	109	61	39	82	153	1,061	0.69%	0	0	0
Youth Party – European Greens	SMS-Z	82	87	86	60	108	111	91	63	57	62	31	838	0.54%	0	0	0
Democratic Labour Party	DSD	67	45	119	67	50	65	62	76	33	56	34	674	0.44%	0	0	0
Greens of Slovenia	ZS	88	64	71	30	30	59	67	58	42	60	24	593	0.38%	0	0	0
Movement for Slovenia	GZS	30	35	21	84	15	37	33	31	19	37	10	352	0.23%	0	0	0
Forward Slovenia	NPS	17	21	31	24	13	21	28	27	22	31	16	251	0.16%	0	0	0
Party of Slovenian People	SSN	20	14	20	15	10	33	11	17	10	21	13	184	0.12%	0	0	0
Valid votes		16,145	15,411	21,444	11,423	9,105	17,114	15,197	15,904	11,410	14,127	7,579	154,859	100.00%	7	4	11
Rejected votes		282	207	290	213	205	197	186	228	164	163	107	2,242	1.43%			
Total polled		16,427	15,618	21,734	11,636	9,310	17,311	15,383	16,132	11,574	14,290	7,686	157,101	70.23%			
Registered electors		22,840	21,432	30,381	16,842	15,087	23,327	22,062	22,261	16,970	20,849	11,634	223,685				
Turnout		71.92%	72.87%	71.54%	69.09%	61.71%	74.21%	69.73%	72.47%	68.20%	68.54%	66.06%	70.23%				

The following candidates were elected:

- Constituency seats - Maja Dimitrovski (LZJ-PS, Moste-Polje 1), 6,679 votes; Roman Jakič (LZJ-PS, Moste-Polje 3), 7,210 votes; Janez Janša (SDS, Grosuplje), 9,696 votes; Jani Möderndorfer (LZJ-PS, Bežigrad 1 & Bežigrad 2), 15,011 votes; Jože Tanko (SDS, Ribnica), 2,823 votes; Janko Veber (SD, Kočevje), 1,852 votes; and Melita Župevc (LZJ-PS, Moste-Polje 2), 6,522 votes.
- National seats - Ljudmila Novak (NSi, Domžale 1 & Ribnica), 2,281 votes; Saša Kos (LZJ-PS, Domžale 2), 6,108 votes; Romana Tomc (SDS, Litija), 3,126 votes; and Gregor Virant (LGV, Domžale 1), 1,872 votes.

Substitutions:

- Janez Janša (SDS, Grosuplje) forfeited his seat on 28 January 2012 upon being elected Prime Minister and was replaced by Robert Hrovat (SDS, Domžale 1) on 2 February 2012.
- Ljudmila Novak (NSi, Domžale 1 & Ribnica) forfeited her seat on 10 February 2012 upon being elected to the government and was replaced by Janez Vasle (NSi, Domžale 2) on 14 February 2012.
- Robert Hrovat (SDS, Domžale 1) forfeited his seat on 20 March 2013 when Janez Janša (SDS, Grosuplje) lost his government position, regaining his seat.
- Janez Vasle (NSi, Domžale 2) forfeited his seat on 20 March 2013 when Ljudmila Novak (NSi, Domžale 1 & Ribnica) lost her government position, regaining her seat.
- Janez Janša (SDS, Grosuplje) resigned on 20 March 2013 and was replaced by Robert Hrovat (SDS, Domžale 1) on 27 March 2013.
- Roman Jakič (LZJ-PS, Moste-Polje 3) forfeited his seat on 20 March 2013 upon being elected to the government and was replaced by Aleksandra Osterman (LZJ-PS, Kočevje) on 27 March 2013.
- Gregor Virant (LGV, Domžale 1) forfeited his seat on 20 March 2013 upon being elected to the government and was replaced by Marko Pavlišič (LGV, Domžale 2) on 27 March 2013.
- Romana Tomc (SDS, Litija) forfeited her seat on 1 July 2014 upon being elected to the European Parliament and was replaced by Anže Logar (SDS, Moste-Polje 1) on 4 July 2014.

==== 2000s ====
===== 2008 =====
Results of the 2008 parliamentary election held on 21 September 2008:

Party		Votes per electoral district											Total votes	%	Seats		
Party		Domžale 1	Domžale 2	Grosuplje	Litija	Kočevje	Ljubljana Bežigrad 1	Ljubljana Bežigrad 2	Ljubljana Moste- Polje 1	Ljubljana Moste- Polje 2	Ljubljana Moste- Polje 3	Ribnica	Total votes	%	Con.	Nat.	Tot.
Social Democrats	SD	4,379	4,740	3,990	2,519	4,197	6,338	6,345	5,175	5,095	5,741	1,376	49,895	33.95%	4	0	4
Slovenian Democratic Party	SDS	4,712	3,887	10,139	3,398	1,571	4,351	2,948	4,234	1,695	2,887	3,579	43,401	29.53%	3	1	4
Zares		1,433	2,157	1,297	1,510	1,012	2,611	2,608	1,572	1,170	1,557	671	17,598	11.98%	1	0	1
Democratic Party of Pensioners of Slovenia	DeSUS	751	789	717	748	388	1,011	784	921	658	769	426	7,962	5.42%	0	1	1
Liberal Democracy of Slovenia	LDS	789	640	991	333	440	629	706	698	618	724	165	6,733	4.58%	0	0	0
Slovenian National Party	SNS	827	701	865	710	442	498	398	670	325	386	369	6,191	4.21%	0	0	0
New Slovenia – Christian People's Party	NSi	894	589	653	233	156	527	418	432	205	367	312	4,786	3.26%	0	0	0
Slovenian People's Party and Youth Party of Slovenia	SLS-SMS	684	268	535	837	582	185	111	398	103	152	223	4,078	2.78%	0	1	1
Lipa		287	274	226	142	74	318	321	309	566	458	87	3,062	2.08%	0	0	0
List for Clear Drinking Water	LZČPV	57	64	83	53	22	73	92	73	58	60	24	659	0.45%	0	0	0
Christian Democratic Party	SKD	85	51	78	39	18	50	38	82	30	53	104	628	0.43%	0	0	0
Greens of Slovenia	ZS	78	77	77	37	32	69	58	60	47	60	20	615	0.42%	0	0	0
Party of Slovenian People	SSN	44	35	70	33	42	28	57	37	26	42	19	433	0.29%	0	0	0
List for Justice and Development	LPR	47	38	62	14	7	46	38	64	35	29	16	396	0.27%	0	0	0
Green Coalition: Green Party and Green Progress	ZL-ZP	52	56	42	15	6	36	29	24	14	33	20	327	0.22%	0	0	0
Forward Slovenia	NPS	19	15	24	17	13	20	23	19	13	22		185	0.13%	0	0	0
Valid votes		15,138	14,381	19,849	10,638	9,002	16,790	14,974	14,768	10,658	13,340	7,411	146,949	100.00%	8	3	11
Rejected votes		289	203	294	257	124	154	160	195	147	171	136	2,130	1.43%			
Total polled		15,427	14,584	20,143	10,895	9,126	16,944	15,134	14,963	10,805	13,511	7,547	149,079	67.32%			
Registered electors		22,095	20,973	29,244	16,592	15,102	23,437	22,334	21,933	17,522	20,708	11,494	221,434				
Turnout		69.82%	69.54%	68.88%	65.66%	60.43%	72.30%	67.76%	68.22%	61.67%	65.25%	65.66%	67.32%				

The following candidates were elected:

- Constituency seats - Anton Colarič (SD, Moste-Polje 3), 5,741 votes; Gregor Golobič (Zares, Bežigrad 1 & Bežigrad 2), 5,219 votes; Janez Janša (SDS, Bežigrad 1 & Grosuplje), 14,490 votes; Janja Klasinc (SD, Moste-Polje 2), 5,095 votes; Igor Lukšič (SD, Bežigrad 2), 6,345 votes; Jože Tanko (SDS, Ribnica), 3,579 votes; Janko Veber (SD, Kočevje), 4,197 votes; and Aleksander Zorn (SDS, Litija), 3,398 votes.
- National seats - Joško Godec (DeSUS, Litija), 748 votes; Robert Hrovat (SDS, Domžale 1), 4,712 votes; and Gvido Kres (SLS-SMS, Litija), 837 votes.

Substitutions:

- Gregor Golobič (Zares, Bežigrad 1 & Bežigrad 2) forfeited his seat on 21 November 2008 upon being elected to the government and was replaced by Cvetka Zalokar Oražem (Zares, Domžale 2) on 16 December 2008.
- Igor Lukšič (SD, Bežigrad 2) forfeited his seat on 21 November 2008 upon being elected to the government and was replaced by Silva Črnugelj (SD, Moste-Polje 1) on 16 December 2008.
- Cvetka Zalokar Oražem (Zares, Domžale 2) forfeited her seat on 22 June 2011 when Gregor Golobič (Zares, Bežigrad 1 & Bežigrad 2) lost his government position, regaining his seat.

===== 2004 =====
Results of the 2004 parliamentary election held on 3 October 2004:

Party		Votes per electoral district											Total votes	%	Seats		
Party		Domžale 1	Domžale 2	Grosuplje	Litija	Kočevje	Ljubljana Bežigrad 1	Ljubljana Bežigrad 2	Ljubljana Moste- Polje 1	Ljubljana Moste- Polje 2	Ljubljana Moste- Polje 3	Ribnica	Total votes	%	Con.	Nat.	Tot.
Slovenian Democratic Party	SDS	4,272	3,754	8,522	2,821	1,700	4,706	3,161	4,209	2,091	3,165	2,664	41,065	30.98%	3	1	4
Liberal Democracy of Slovenia	LDS	3,036	3,402	3,265	1,877	1,841	4,320	4,926	3,320	2,883	4,225	893	33,988	25.64%	3	1	4
United List of Social Democrats	ZLSD	998	1,280	842	686	2,327	1,868	1,906	1,277	1,347	1,470	681	14,682	11.08%	1	0	1
New Slovenia – Christian People's Party	NSi	2,001	1,591	1,581	518	363	1,366	952	1,282	570	943	1,499	12,666	9.55%	1	0	1
Slovenian National Party	SNS	762	765	683	626	472	800	771	714	594	700	247	7,134	5.38%	0	1	1
Slovenian People's Party	SLS	668	413	905	1,957	350	282	181	542	150	172	433	6,053	4.57%	0	0	0
Active Slovenia	AS	449	395	624	272	187	510	427	458	310	336	154	4,122	3.11%	0	0	0
Democratic Party of Pensioners of Slovenia	DeSUS	295	331	186	275	212	410	389	333	271	350	89	3,141	2.37%	0	0	0
Youth Party of Slovenia	SMS	219	175	202	238	111	226	206	221	242	173	59	2,072	1.56%	0	0	0
Slovenia is Ours	SN	373	250	117	52	54	225	240	168	329	200	33	2,041	1.54%	0	0	0
June List	JL	93	126	99	53	56	199	171	112	144	126	24	1,203	0.91%	0	0	0
List for Enterprising Slovenia	PS	57	44	33	209	78	44	32	87	51	45	333	1,013	0.76%	0	0	0
Greens of Slovenia	ZS	133	152	60	39	117	97	105	82	83	92	23	983	0.74%	0	0	0
Party of Ecological; Movements of Slovenia	SEG	25	54	77	37	9	69	98	68	56	54	21	568	0.43%	0	0	0
Women's Voice of Slovenia, Association for Primorska, Union of Independents of Slovenia and New Democracy of Slovenia	GZS- ZZP- ZNS- NDS	50	44	119	25	8	49	71	43	31	43	7	490	0.37%	0	0	0
Democratic Party of Slovenia	DS	71	58	58			48	71	60	39	64		469	0.35%	0	0	0
Party of Slovenian People	SSN	35	42	21	21	29	17	27	34	26	24	11	287	0.22%	0	0	0
Social Liberal Party	LS	25	22	26	14	26	23	18	32	18	20	13	237	0.18%	0	0	0
Forward Slovenia	NPS	15	19	28	9	13	19	22	24	13	40	11	213	0.16%	0	0	0
United for an Independent and Just Slovenia		14	13	10	7	7	12	19	14	10	18	13	137	0.10%	0	0	0
Valid votes		13,591	12,930	17,458	9,736	7,960	15,290	13,793	13,080	9,258	12,260	7,208	132,564	100.00%	8	3	11
Rejected votes		307	220	351	264	183	219	205	234	203	212	118	2,516	1.86%			
Total polled		13,898	13,150	17,809	10,000	8,143	15,509	13,998	13,314	9,461	12,472	7,326	135,080	63.41%			
Registered electors		20,545	19,777	26,618	15,851	14,514	23,498	22,274	20,894	17,704	20,536	10,805	213,016				
Turnout		67.65%	66.49%	66.91%	63.09%	56.10%	66.00%	62.84%	63.72%	53.44%	60.73%	67.80%	63.41%				

The following candidates were elected:

- Constituency seats - Milan Cvikl (LDS, Bežigrad 1), 4,320 votes; Janez Drobnič (NSi, Ribnica), 1,499 votes; Janez Janša (SDS, Bežigrad 1 & Grosuplje), 13,228 votes; Dimitrij Kovačič (SDS, Moste-Polje 1), 4,209 votes; Anton Rop (LDS, Bežigrad 2 & Moste-Polje 3), 9,151 votes; Jožef Školč (LDS, Moste-Polje 2), 2,883 votes; Jože Tanko (SDS, Ribnica), 2,664 votes; and Janko Veber (ZLSD, Kočevje), 2,327 votes.
- National seats - Robert Hrovat (SDS, Domžale 1), 4,272 votes; Cvetka Zalokar Oražem (LDS, Domžale 2), 3,402 votes; and Barbara Žgajner Tavš (SNS, Moste-Polje 2), 594 votes.

Substitutions:

- Janez Janša (SDS, Bežigrad 1 & Grosuplje) forfeited his seat on 9 November 2004 upon being elected Prime Minister and was replaced by Tomaž Štebe (SDS, Domžale 2) on 2 December 2004.
- Janez Drobnič (NSi, Ribnica) forfeited her seat on 3 December 2004 upon being elected to the government and was replaced by Franc Capuder (NSi, Domžale 1) on 16 December 2004.
- Franc Capuder (NSi, Domžale 1) forfeited his seat on 1 December 2006 when Janez Drobnič (NSi, Ribnica) lost his government position, regaining his seat.

===== 2000 =====
Results of the 2000 parliamentary election held on 15 October 2000:

Party		Votes per electoral district											Total votes	%	Seats		
Party		Domžale 1	Domžale 2	Grosuplje	Litija	Kočevje	Ljubljana Bežigrad 1	Ljubljana Bežigrad 2	Ljubljana Moste- Polje 1	Ljubljana Moste- Polje 2	Ljubljana Moste- Polje 3	Ribnica	Total votes	%	Con.	Nat.	Tot.
Liberal Democracy of Slovenia	LDS	5,198	6,244	4,719	3,736	2,832	7,521	7,835	5,623	4,756	6,153	1,466	56,083	38.05%	4	0	4
Social Democratic Party of Slovenia	SDSS	2,033	2,072	6,819	1,740	1,513	2,706	2,001	2,422	1,188	1,878	2,547	26,919	18.26%	2	0	2
United List of Social Democrats	ZLSD	1,233	1,433	1,330	1,049	2,967	2,168	2,460	1,639	2,354	2,050	692	19,375	13.14%	1	1	2
New Slovenia – Christian People's Party	NSi	1,940	1,311	1,445	720	548	1,581	1,098	1,346	586	1,069	1,097	12,741	8.64%	1	0	1
Slovenian People's Party and Slovene Christian Democrats	SLS-SKD	1,601	926	1,403	1,933	949	662	455	971	258	394	817	10,369	7.03%	0	1	1
Slovenian National Party	SNS	529	577	420	459	592	704	827	645	1,184	1,187	184	7,308	4.96%	0	1	1
Youth Party of Slovenia	SMS	616	516	700	436	277	829	625	669	506	610	246	6,030	4.09%	0	0	0
Democratic Party of Pensioners of Slovenia	DeSUS	381	392	367	305	284	471	571	492	267	489	148	4,167	2.83%	0	0	0
Greens of Slovenia	ZS	83	86	163	42	210	131	126	91	77	138	64	1,211	0.82%	0	0	0
Democratic Party of Slovenia	DS	105	144	71	23	56	117	79	79	79	77	48	878	0.60%	0	0	0
Forward Slovenia	NPS	135	72	82	30	55	92	76	88	72	98	31	831	0.56%	0	0	0
New Party	NS	86	81	123	35	33	78	77	71	60	76	52	772	0.52%	0	0	0
Movement for Human Rights	GČP	74	52	70	33	71	71	64	95	73	79	41	723	0.49%	0	0	0
Valid votes		14,014	13,906	17,712	10,541	10,387	17,131	16,294	14,231	11,460	14,298	7,433	147,407	100.00%	8	3	11
Rejected votes		509	339	597	410	355	440	437	522	360	424	245	4,638	3.05%			
Total polled		14,523	14,245	18,309	10,951	10,742	17,571	16,731	14,753	11,820	14,722	7,678	152,045	74.11%			
Registered electors		19,028	18,705	24,048	15,028	14,984	23,231	22,506	19,925	17,328	20,434	9,935	205,152				
Turnout		76.32%	76.16%	76.14%	72.87%	71.69%	75.64%	74.34%	74.04%	68.21%	72.05%	77.28%	74.11%				

The following candidates were elected:

- Constituency seats - Igor Bavčar (LDS); Janez Drobnič (NSi); Mitja Gaspari (LDS); Janez Janša (SDSS); Anton Rop (LDS); Jože Tanko (SDSS); Janko Veber (ZLSD); and Cvetka Zalokar Oražem (LDS).
- National seats - Zmago Jelinčič (SNS); Franc Rokavec (SLS-SKD); and Danica Simšič (ZLSD).

Substitutions:

- Igor Bavčar (LDS) forfeited his seat on 30 November 2000 upon being elected to the government and was replaced by Roman Jakič (LDS) on 19 December 2000.
- Anton Rop (LDS) forfeited his seat on 30 November 2000 upon being elected to the government and was replaced by Jožef Školč (LDS) on 19 December 2000.
- Mitja Gaspari (LDS) forfeited his seat on 1 April 2001 upon being appointed governor of the Bank of Slovenia and was replaced by Jožef Školč (LDS) 11 April 2001. Školč's seat as replacement for Anton Rop was taken by Stana Stopar (LDS) on 11 April 2001.
- Roman Jakič (LDS) forfeited his seat on 24 January 2002 when Igor Bavčar (LDS) left his government position, regaining his seat.
- Igor Bavčar (LDS) resigned on 24 January 2002 and was replaced by Roman Jakič (LDS) on 24 January 2002.
- Danica Simšič (ZLSD) resigned on 20 December 2002 and was replaced by Rado Bohinc (ZLSD) on 27 January 2003. However, as Bohinc has been elected to the government on 19 December 2002, Simšič's seat was taken by Jerica Mrzel (ZLSD) on 27 January 2003.

==== 1990s ====
===== 1996 =====
Results of the 1996 parliamentary election held on 10 November 1996:

Party		Votes per electoral district											Total votes	%	Seats		
Party		Domžale 1	Domžale 2	Grosuplje	Litija	Kočevje	Ljubljana Bežigrad 1	Ljubljana Bežigrad 2	Ljubljana Moste- Polje 1	Ljubljana Moste- Polje 2	Ljubljana Moste- Polje 3	Ribnica	Total votes	%	Con.	Nat.	Tot.
Liberal Democracy of Slovenia	LDS	3,650	3,871	3,144	3,157	2,386	5,253	5,510	3,971	3,980	4,714	1,149	40,785	28.08%	3	0	3
Social Democratic Party of Slovenia	SDSS	2,268	2,263	6,996	1,247	1,953	2,897	2,574	2,381	1,525	2,204	2,341	28,649	19.72%	2	0	2
Slovenian People's Party	SLS	3,417	2,782	2,676	2,895	719	2,576	1,514	2,682	1,125	1,560	1,634	23,580	16.23%	1	1	2
United List of Social Democrats	ZLSD	675	876	1,149	579	2,125	1,985	2,634	977	1,966	2,286	519	15,771	10.86%	1	0	1
Slovene Christian Democrats	SKD	1,430	970	1,913	1,023	897	1,263	961	1,268	636	1,079	1,141	12,581	8.66%	0	1	1
Democratic Party of Slovenia	DS	387	920	279	181	117	864	727	1,132	526	538	100	5,771	3.97%	0	0	0
Slovenian National Party	SNS	390	514	273	263	407	691	730	526	524	583	87	4,988	3.43%	0	0	0
Greens of Slovenia	ZS	214	203	151	169	474	299	332	392	240	315	80	2,869	1.98%	0	0	0
Democratic Party of Pensioners of Slovenia	DeSUS	161	187	173	198	333	329	574	0	167	337	126	2,585	1.78%	0	0	0
Slovenian Craftsmen and Entrepreneurial; Party and Centrum Party	SOPS	148	190	187	72	55	145	136	102	85	92	33	1,245	0.86%	0	0	0
Communist Party of Slovenia	KPS	72	78	59	58	115	125	148	150	154	205	22	1,186	0.82%	0	0	0
Green Alternative of Slovenia	ZA	64	61	115	30	156	75	94	50	65	69	25	804	0.55%	0	0	0
Christian Social Union	KSU	84	74	48	20	46	62	112	59	39	74	41	659	0.45%	0	0	0
Liberal Party	LS	55	46	40	21	36	106	88	61	63	83	32	631	0.43%	0	0	0
Slovenian Forum	SF	29	57	30	30	58	114	78	54	77	86	11	624	0.43%	0	0	0
Forward Slovenia	NPS	51	31	35	29	127	29	48	62	36	43	12	503	0.35%	0	0	0
Patriotic United Retirement Party and League for Slovenia	DEUS-LZS	0	0	0	0	0	100	0	173	81	136	0	490	0.34%	0	0	0
Slovenian National Right	SND	44	32	49	36	52	48	54	46	35	55	13	464	0.32%	0	0	0
National Labour Party	NSD	33	41	32	31	62	57	58	43	41	50	10	458	0.32%	0	0	0
New Party	NS	29	32	22	37	69	41	47	17	26	35	9	364	0.25%	0	0	0
Republican Association of Slovenia	RZS	40	23	10	34	16	24	25	20	15	23	8	238	0.16%	0	0	0
Valid votes		13,241	13,251	17,381	10,110	10,203	17,083	16,444	14,166	11,406	14,567	7,393	145,245	100.00%	7	2	9
Rejected votes													8,121	5.30%			
Total polled													153,366	77.59%			
Registered electors													197,655				
Turnout													77.59%				

The following candidates were elected:

- Constituency seats - Metod Dragonja (LDS); Slavko Gaber (LDS); Janez Janša (SDSS); Franc Rokavec (SLS); Jožef Školč (LDS); Bogomir Špiletič (SDSS); and Janko Veber (ZLSD).
- National seats - Benjamin Henigman (SKD); and Ciril Smrkolj (SLS).

Substitutions:

- Metod Dragonja (LDS) forfeited his seat on 27 February 1997 upon being elected to the government and was replaced by Jože Lenič (LDS) on 25 March 1997.
- Slavko Gaber (LDS) forfeited his seat on 27 February 1997 upon being elected to the government and was replaced by Roman Jakič (LDS) on 25 March 1997.
- Jožef Školč (LDS) forfeited his seat on 27 February 1997 upon being elected to the government and was replaced by Mirko Kaplja (LDS) on 25 March 1997.
- Ciril Smrkolj (SLS) forfeited his seat on 27 February 1997 upon being elected to the government and was replaced by Franc But (SLS) on 25 March 1997.
- Franc But (SLS) forfeited his seat on 3 April 1997 upon being appointed to the government. But's seat as replacement for Ciril Smrkolj was taken by Janez Per (SLS) on 22 April 1997.
- Jože Lenič (LDS) forfeited his seat on 20 April 1999 when Metod Dragonja (LDS) left his government position, regaining his seat.
- Metod Dragonja (LDS) resigned on 20 April 1999 and was replaced by Mirko Kaplja (LDS) on 23 April 1999. Kaplja's seat as replacement for Jožef Školč was taken by Jože Lenič (LDS) on 23 April 1999.
- Roman Jakič (LDS) forfeited his seat on 29 July 1999 when Slavko Gaber (LDS) left his government position, regaining his seat.
- Slavko Gaber (LDS) resigned on 29 July 1999 and was replaced by Jože Lenič (LDS) on 30 July 1999. Lenič's seat as replacement for Jožef Školč was taken by Roman Jakič (LDS) on 30 July 1999.
- Jože Lenič (LDS) forfeited his seat on 18 January 2000 upon being appointed president of the management board of the Capital Pension and Disability Insurance Fund and was replaced by Roman Jakič (LDS) on 20 January 2000. Jakič's seat as replacement for Jožef Školč was taken by Stana Stopar (LDS) on 20 January 2000.
- Stana Stopar (LDS) forfeited his seat on 7 June 2000 when Jožef Školč (LDS) lost his government position, regaining his seat.
- Janez Janša (SDSS) forfeited his seat on 7 June 2000 upon being elected to the government and was replaced by Irena Virant (SDSS) on 20 June 2000.
- Jožef Školč (LDS) resigned on 13 June 2000 and was replaced by Stana Stopar (LDS) on 20 June 2000.

===== 1992 =====
Results of the 1992 parliamentary election held on 6 December 1992:

Party		Votes	%	Seats		
Party		Votes	%	Con.	Nat.	Tot.
Liberal Democracy of Slovenia	LDS	34,836	22.50%	2	1	3
Slovene Christian Democrats	SKD	22,475	14.52%	1	0	1
United List	ZL	20,186	13.04%	1	1	2
Slovenian National Party	SNS	19,974	12.90%	1	0	1
Slovenian People's Party	SLS	10,587	6.84%	0	0	0
Democratic Party of Slovenia	DS	8,453	5.46%	0	1	1
Social Democratic Party of Slovenia	SDSS	6,421	4.15%	0	0	0
Greens of Slovenia	ZS	5,865	3.79%	0	1	1
Socialist Party of Slovenia	SSS	4,681	3.02%	0	0	0
Independent	Ind	4,479	2.89%	0	0	0
Liberal Democratic Party of Slovenia	LDSS	2,724	1.76%	0	0	0
National Democratic Party and Slovenian Party	ND-SGS	2,602	1.68%	0	0	0
Slovenian Craftsmen and Entrepreneurial; Party and Centrum Party	SOPS	2,036	1.32%	0	0	0
Christian Socialists, DS Forward and Free Party	KS-DS	1,892	1.22%	0	0	0
Independent Party	SN	1,567	1.01%	0	0	0
Liberal Party	LS	1,244	0.80%	0	0	0
Movement for General Democracy	GOD	1,064	0.69%	0	0	0
Slovenian Ecological Movement	SEG	967	0.62%	0	0	0
DEMOS	DEMOS	721	0.47%	0	0	0
“SMER" Association of Slovenia	SMER	720	0.47%	0	0	0
Green Movement of the Municipality of Ljubljana Moste Polje	ZGM-P	708	0.46%	0	0	0
Republican Association of Slovenia	RZS	606	0.39%	0	0	0
Valid votes		154,808	100.00%	5	4	9
Rejected votes		11,618	6.98%			
Total polled		166,426	87.76%			
Registered electors		189,635				

The following candidates were elected:

- Constituency seats - Tone Anderlič (LDS); Benjamin Henigman (SKD); Mateja Kožuh Novak (ZL); Andrej Lenarčič (SNS); and Jože Lenič (LDS).
- National seats - Janez Jančar (LDS); Lev Kreft (ZL); Leo Šešerko (ZS); and Danica Simšič (DS).
