= Podlipoglav =

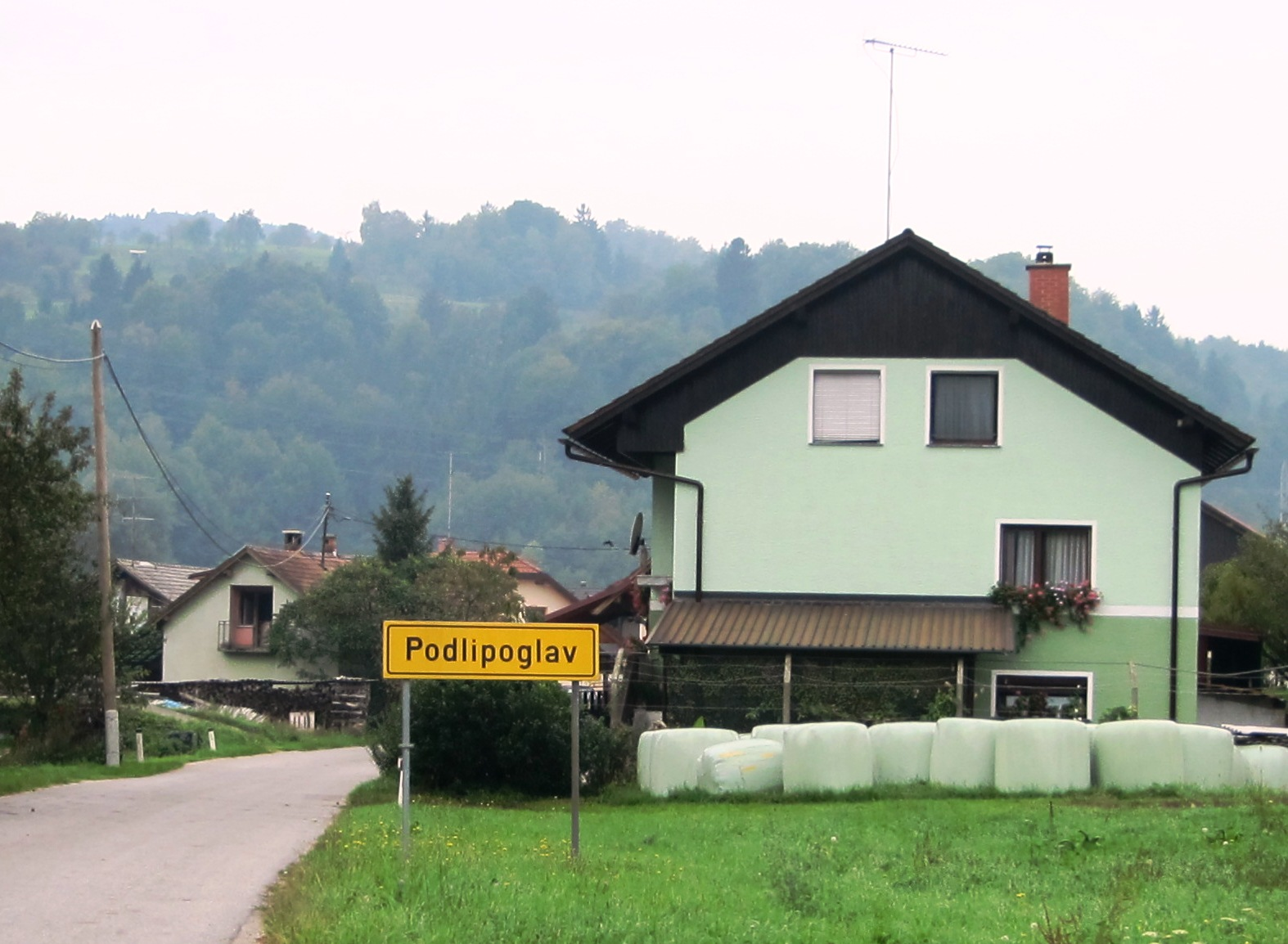
- Podlipoglav

- Location in Slovenia
- Coordinates: 46°1′1.26″N 14°37′23.78″E
- Country: Slovenia
- Traditional region: Lower Carniola
- Statistical region: Central Slovenia
- Municipality: Ljubljana

Area
  - Total: 2.6 km^{2} (1.0 sq mi)
- Elevation: 301.6 m (990 ft)

Population (2015)
  - Total: 207
  - Density: 80/km^{2} (210/sq mi)
- Postal code: 1261

Podlipoglav (pronounced [pɔˈdliːpɔɡlau̯]) is a village in the City Municipality of Ljubljana in central Slovenia. The area is part of the traditional region of Lower Carniola and is now included with the rest of the municipality in the Central Slovenia Statistical Region.

== Name ==
The name Podlipoglav is a fused prepositional phrase meaning 'below Lipoglav' in which the noun has lost its case ending. The name Lipoglav itself is derived from *Lupoglav, presumably from *lupъ 'bare, exposed', thus meaning 'bare hilltop'. The village was known as Podlipoglou in German in the past.

== History ==
A Roman period burial ground with 33 1st- and 2nd-century burials was partially excavated in Podlipoglav by the City Museum of Ljubljana in 1997. Some of the finds, including oil lamps and bronze bracelets, date from the 4th or 5th century AD.

== Cultural heritage ==
In addition to the Roman-era cemetery, several other structures in Podlipoglav have registered cultural heritage status:

- A mill and hayrack are located at the Dolenc farm at Podlipoglav no. 25. The mill dates from the 19th century and includes two pairs of millstones and stamp mills. The mill was used to grind flour and later to grind spices. It operated until the 1990s. The hayrack at the farm bears the year 1912 on its gable and has a catslide roof on one side.
- A house in Podlipoglav has been turned into a Partisan memorial with plaques commemorating several local events from the Second World War: the establishment of the Molnik Company (Slovene: Molniška četa) on 13 July 1941, the establishment of the second Styrian battalion on 15 December 1941, the burning of 11 houses in Podlipoglav by Italian troops on 24 March 1942, a Partisan encampment from April to September 1942, the battle on Pugled Hill on 23 March 1942, the battle at Janče from 19 to 21 May 1942, the battle at Liberga on 24 December 1942, the presence of the central committee of the Slovenian Communist Party in the village from September to October 1942, and the operation of an underground communist print shop in Sadinja Vas. The sculpting above the door of the house was created by Marko Šlajmer (1927–1969) and Frančišek Smerdu (1908–1964). The house and its museum collection were set up in 1959. The house is located in the center of the village at the intersection of the road to Šentpavel.
- At the edge of the forest behind the house at Podlipoglav 23 there is a marker at the place where the underground Urška print shop was operated by the Partisans in the fall of 1942.
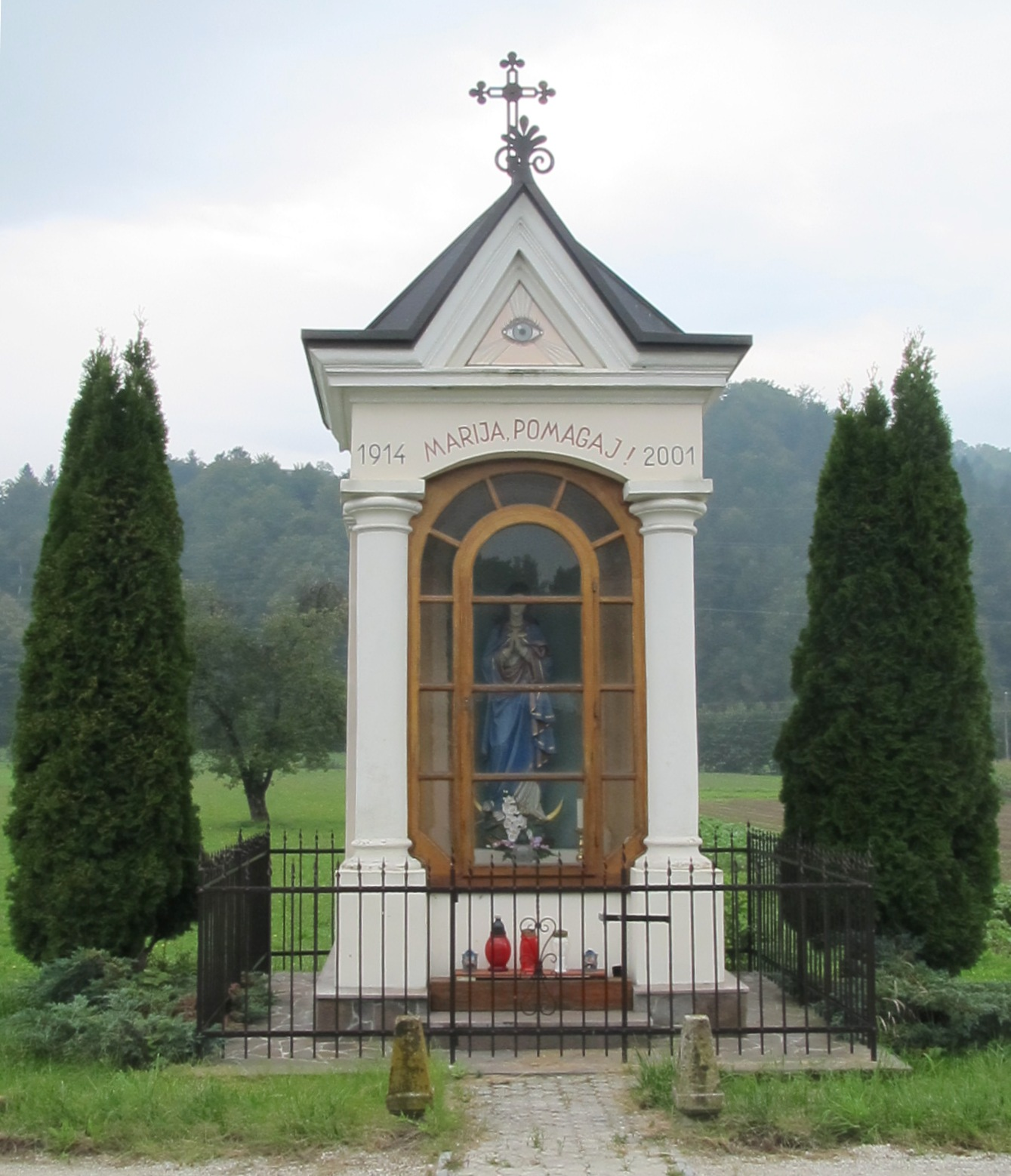
Wayside shrine

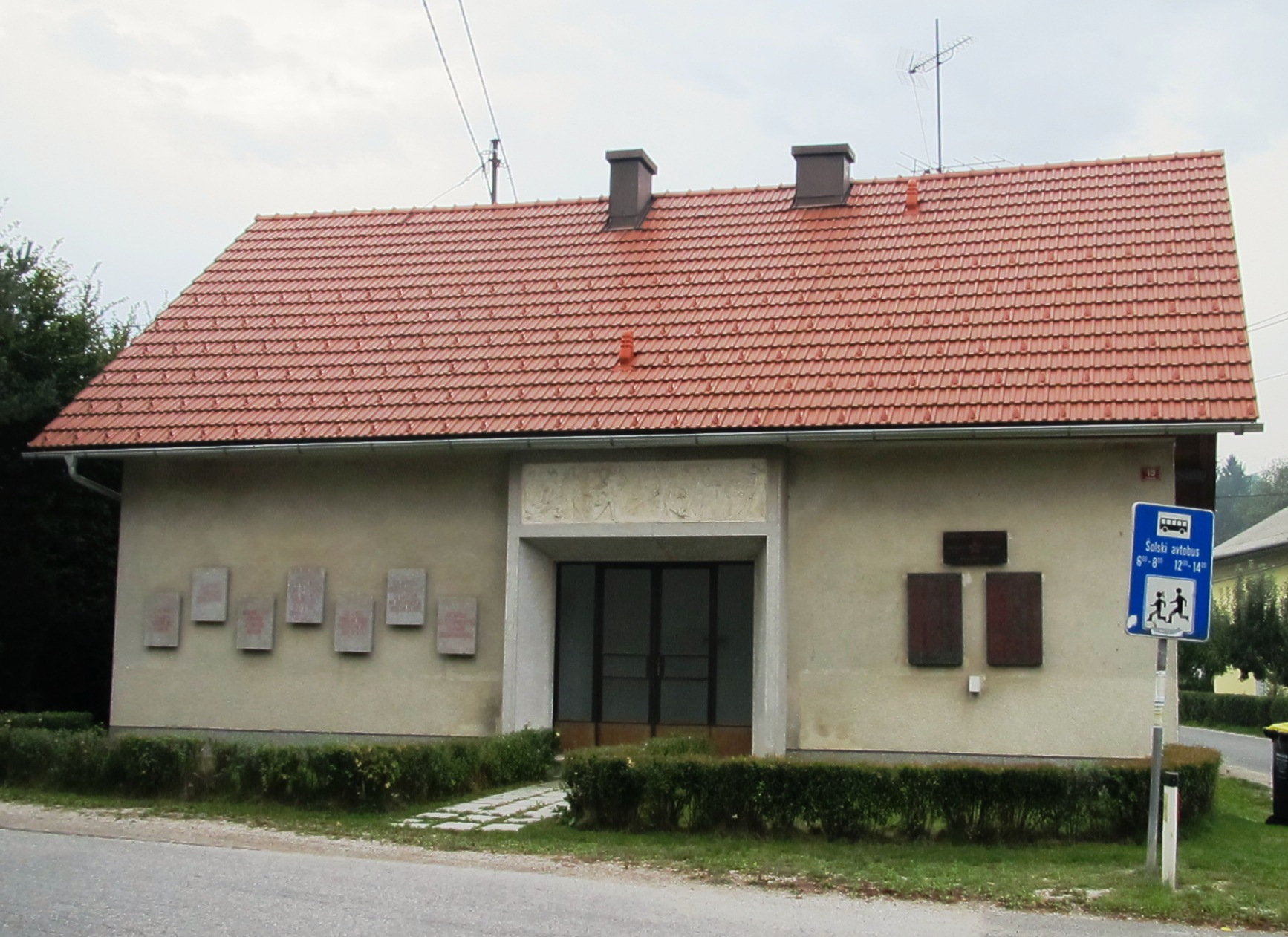
Partisan memorial

== Notable people ==
Notable people that were born or lived in Podlipoglav include:

- Janez Hribar (1918–1978), Partisan, communist politician, and people's hero of Yugoslavia
