= Sela pri Sobračah =

Sela pri Sobračah Selo pri Svetem Andreju (until 1952)
- Location in Slovenia
- Coordinates: 45°59′39.69″N 14°52′56.14″E
- Country: Slovenia
- Traditional region: Lower Carniola
- Statistical region: Central Slovenia
- Municipality: Ivančna Gorica

Area
  - Total: 0.53 km^{2} (0.20 sq mi)
- Elevation: 360.8 m (1,184 ft)

Population (2002)
  - Total: 36

Sela pri Sobračah (pronounced [ˈseːla pɾi ˈsoːbɾatʃax]; formerly Selo pri Svetem Andreju, German: Selo bei Sankt Andrä) is a small settlement in the Municipality of Ivančna Gorica in central Slovenia. It lies northeast of Šentvid, just off the regional road northwards to Šmartno pri Litiji. The area is part of the historical region of Lower Carniola. The municipality is now included in the Central Slovenia Statistical Region.

== Name ==
The name of the settlement was changed from Selo pri Svetem Andreju (literally, 'Selo near Saint Andrew') to Sela pri Sobračah (literally, 'Sela near Sobrače') in 1952. The name was changed on the basis of the 1948 Law on Names of Settlements and Designations of Squares, Streets, and Buildings as part of efforts by Slovenia's postwar communist government to remove religious elements from toponyms. In the past the German name was Selo bei Sankt Andrä.
