= Trzin =

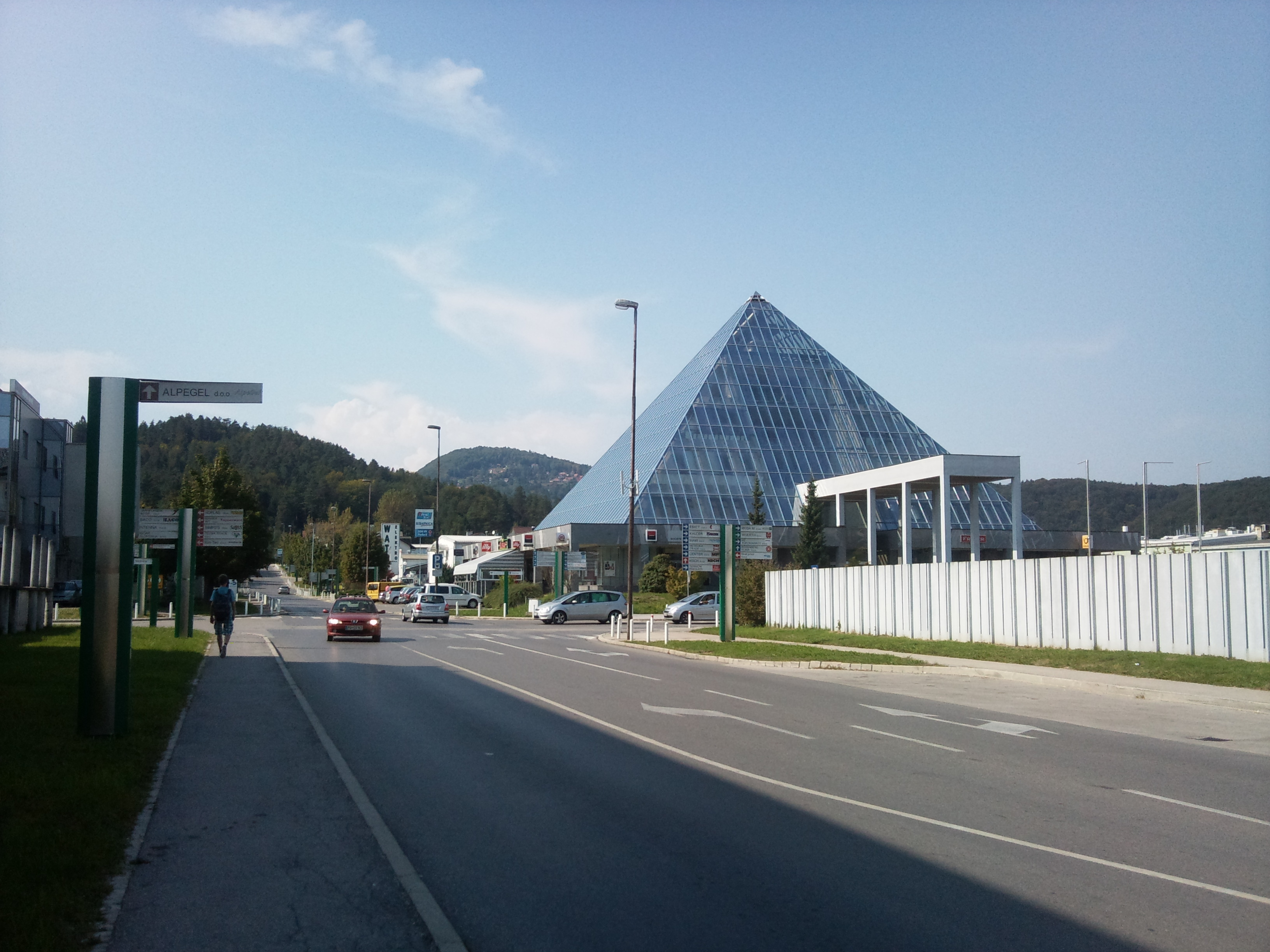
- Trzin Handicraft and Industrial Zone

- Location in Slovenia
- Coordinates: 46°8′7″N 14°33′36″E
- Country: Slovenia
- Traditional region: Upper Carniola
- Statistical region: Central Slovenia
- Municipality: Trzin

Area
  - Total: 8.62 km^{2} (3.33 sq mi)
- Elevation: 299.0 m (981.0 ft)

Population (2021)
  - Total: 3,925
  - Density: 456/km^{2} (1,180/sq mi)

Trzin (pronounced [təɾˈzin] or [təɾˈziːn]; German: Tersain) is a town in the eastern part of the Upper Carniola region of Slovenia. It is the seat of the Municipality of Trzin and also the only settlement in the municipality.

Trzin has a population of 3,922. Its elevation is 299 metres (981 ft) above sea level. The town is divided into three parts: the old quarter, Mlake (the new quarter), and the trade-industrial zone. The oldest part of the town is located between Onger Hill to the west and the Mengeš Basin (Slovene: Mengeško polje) to the east. Trzin's elementary school, town hall, library, fire station, and the 14th-century St. Florian's Church, as well as a number of farms, are all in this part of the town.

Mlake, which is located on the west side of Onger Hill, has banks, a preschool, a leisure centre, and several pubs. It was built on a former swamp. The trade and industrial zone is the newest part of Trzin, built in 1985.

The Slovene politician and journalist Ivan Hribar was born in Trzin.

== History ==
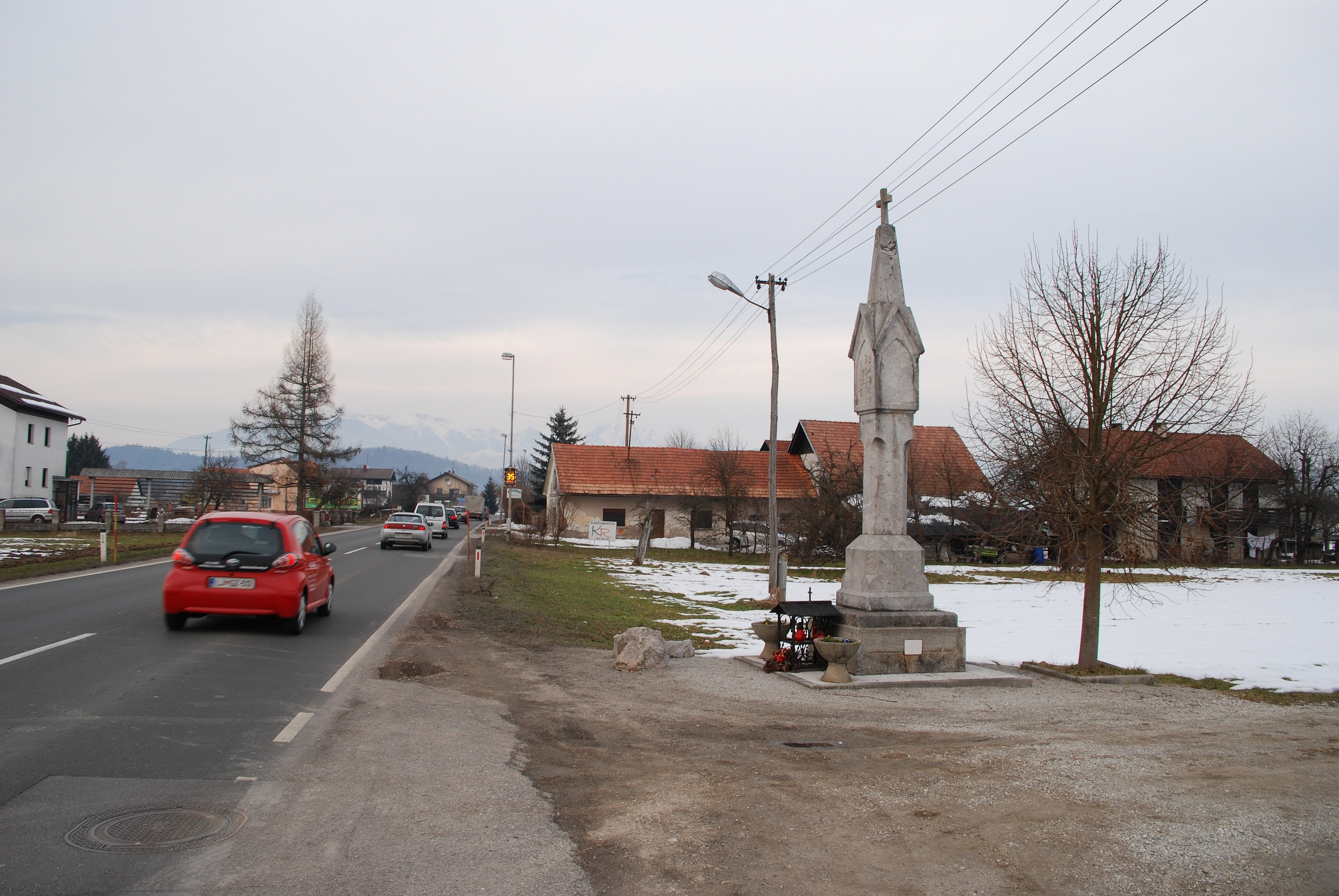
St. Florian's Shrine in Trzin stands in the northern part of the settlement next to busy Mengeš Street (Slovene: Mengeška cesta), which links Trzin and Mengeš. It was erected in the 19th century.

The oldest preserved document to mention Trzin is dated 15 May 1273. The document is a confirmation by the Carniolan state governor that a certain Vilijem Svibenjki yielded rights to six farms in Trzin on the behalf of the German nobility; the town is mentioned under the name of Direzin. Later documents refer to the town as Terzzein, Terzeyn, Trezein, and Tersein.

Roman archaeological excavations testify to Roman settlements because the Roman road from Emona to Celeia led through Trzin. A local quarry has yielded a Neolithic stone hatchet, which proves the presence of a permanent settlement of this area.

Johann Weikhard von Valvasor described the inhabitants of Trzin as being renowned for making excellent beds, fishing nets, fishing rods and ropes, although they were mostly stock farmers. The local sausage makers are supposedly the "inventors" of Carniola sausage (Kranjska klobasa).

Together with inhabitants of Mengeš and Goričice, the people of Trzin defeated the Turks on Mengeš Field. On 8 September 1813, they fought with Napoleon's Austrian soldiers on Mengeš Field, attacking the 7,000 Frenchmen led by General Belotti.

During the French annexation, brigands flourished in the area, some staying after the French forces had pulled back. According to a well-known story, the most famous brigand, Dimež (Franc Sicherl) and his accomplice Pepelnak (Matijc Mlakar), were killed by the smoke of Trzin's brickyard, on 20 January 1862.

Men from Trzin fought in World War I on the northern border under Rudolf Maister. Eleven men from Trzin fell and four were recorded as missing. During World War I, a nearby airport was used as a base for thirty-two airplanes. During World War II, 25 townsfolk were killed, three died as hostages, five other inhabitants died in internment, and 79 were evicted from their homes.

Trzin played an important role in the Slovenian Independence War of 1991, when the army of the Slovenian Territorial Defence and the Yugoslav People's Army fought on the bridge over the Pšata River on 27 June 1991. Four soldiers from the Yugoslav People's Army were killed, along with one Territorial Defence member.

Until 1998, Trzin was part of the Municipality of Domžale.

== Economy ==
Trzin has a rich history in manufacturing handicrafts, with its residents being renowned for their proficiency in trade, hospitality, butchery, baking, leatherworking, tailoring, carpentry, blacksmithing and brickworks. Following World War II and the advent of communism, many craftsmen left their trade. However, in the 80s and 90s, due to the establishment of the Trzin's business and trade district, the city saw a gradual improvement in its small and medium business sector.

The industrial zone was founded in 1985 and began operating in 1987. Nowadays, 868 companies do business in Trzin, including KIMI d.o.o., which is the first private company to begin operating in Trzin, in 1988. It manufactures paints, varnishes and other chemical products. It employs over 50 workers.

== Church ==
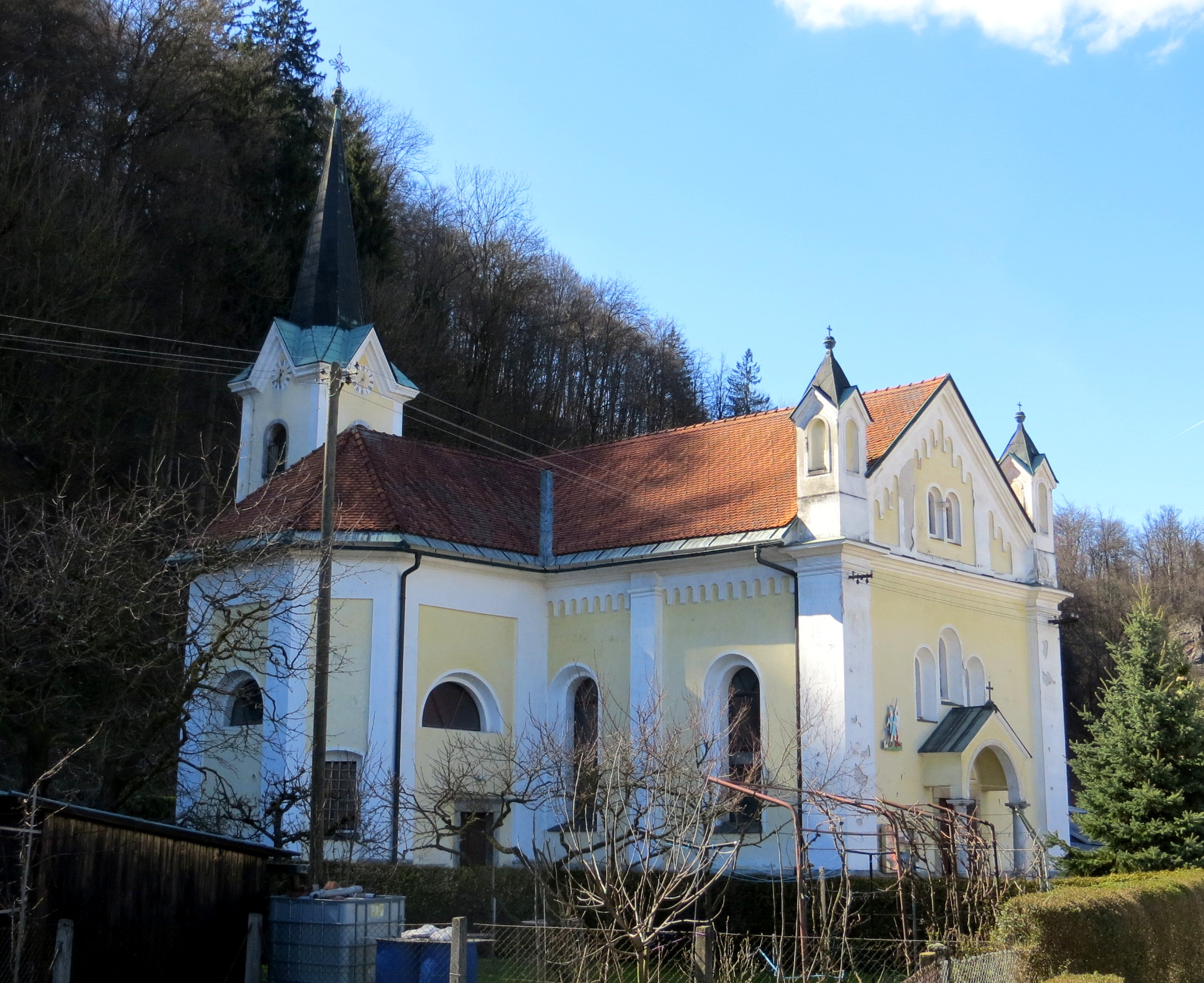
Saint Florian's Church

In the past, St. Florian's Church underwent several renovations, including after the 1895 Ljubljana earthquake. It contains works by several renowned artists, including Franc Jelovšek, L. Layer, M. Koželj, and Jože Plečnik. The church, which was first documented in 1526, has been the seat of an independent parish since 1974.

== Other institutions ==
Trzin Primary School was founded in 1985. Prior to this, children in Trzin went to school in Mengeš or Domžale. The new school was initially named Edvard Kardelj Elementary School, after a leading member of the Communist Party, but its name was changed after independence was declared. The school was expanded between 2003 and 2005. Today, it has eighteen sections (first to ninth grade) instructing more than 350 children. It offers a wide range of activities in culture, science, social sciences, technical subjects, and sports. Two preschool groups, called Thumbelina (Slovene: Palčica) and Frogs (Slovene: Žabice), provide childcare facilities.

Starting in 1894, Trzin had its own municipality and gendarmerie. Municipal matters were run by a judge, with two assistants. On the formation of municipalities in the second half of the 19th century, Trzin received a local office, which operated independently until the German annexation, when Trzin was joined to the Municipality of Mengeš. In the first election in which councillors of the local people's committees were elected, the town was re-joined to Mengeš. In 1970, Trzin regained its autonomy within the municipality of Domžale. Trzin became an independent municipality in 1998. The mayor of the Municipality of Trzin is Peter Ložar.

The Onger Hiking Club, which was founded in 1983, is named after the hill that divides the old and new parts of Trzin.
