= Pusti Javor =

Settlement in Slovenia

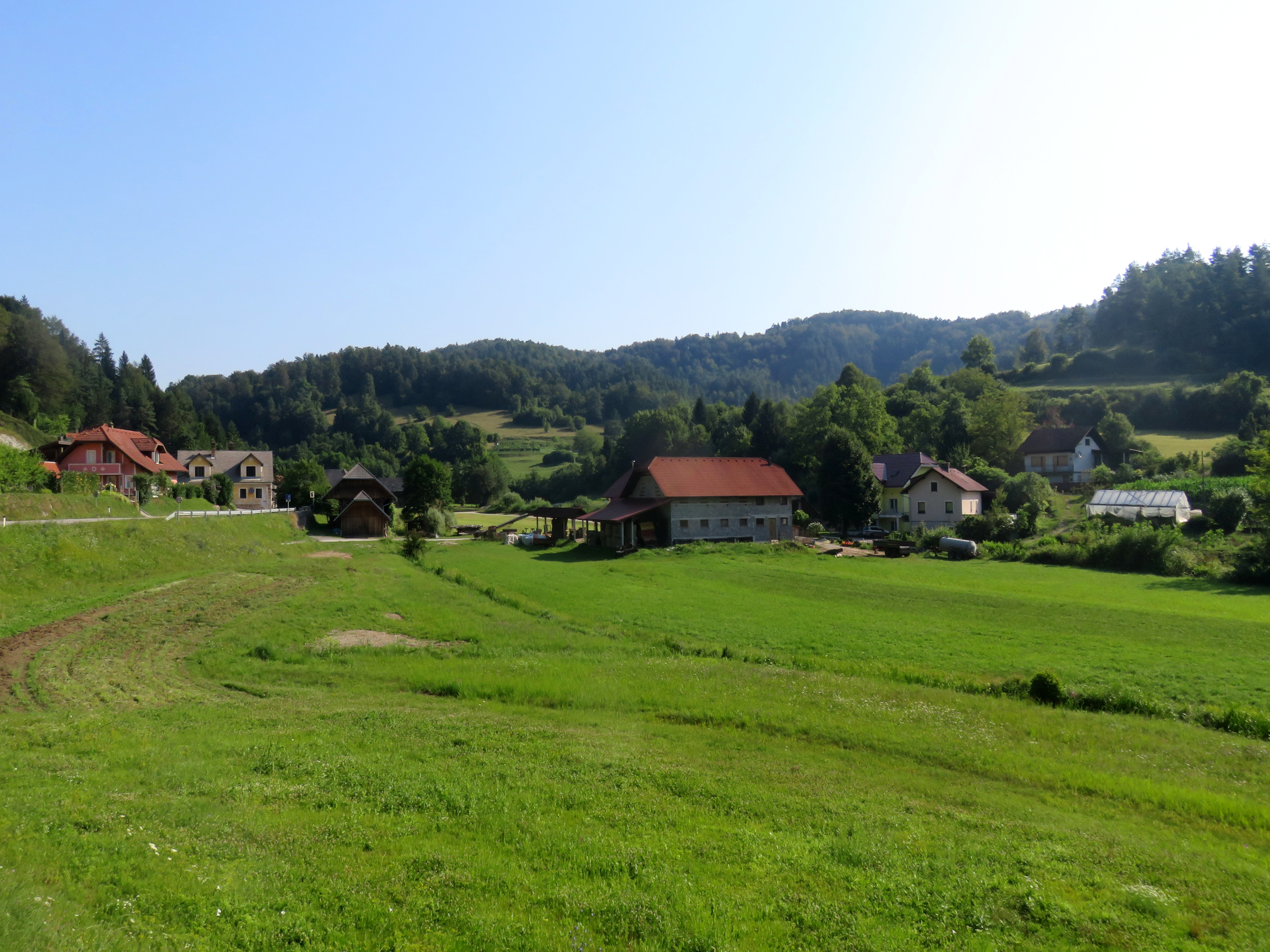

- Location in Slovenia
- Coordinates: 46°0′5.89″N 14°52′14.25″E
- Country: Slovenia
- Traditional region: Lower Carniola
- Statistical region: Central Slovenia
- Municipality: Ivančna Gorica

Area
  - Total: 2.02 km^{2} (0.78 sq mi)
- Elevation: 360.4 m (1,182 ft)

Population (2002)
  - Total: 20

Pusti Javor (pronounced [ˈpuːsti ˈjaːʋɔɾ]) is a small settlement in the Municipality of Ivančna Gorica in central Slovenia. It lies in the hills northeast of Šentvid pri Stični, close to the source of the Temenica River. The area is part of the historical region of Lower Carniola. The municipality is now included in the Central Slovenia Statistical Region.
