= Radanja Vas =

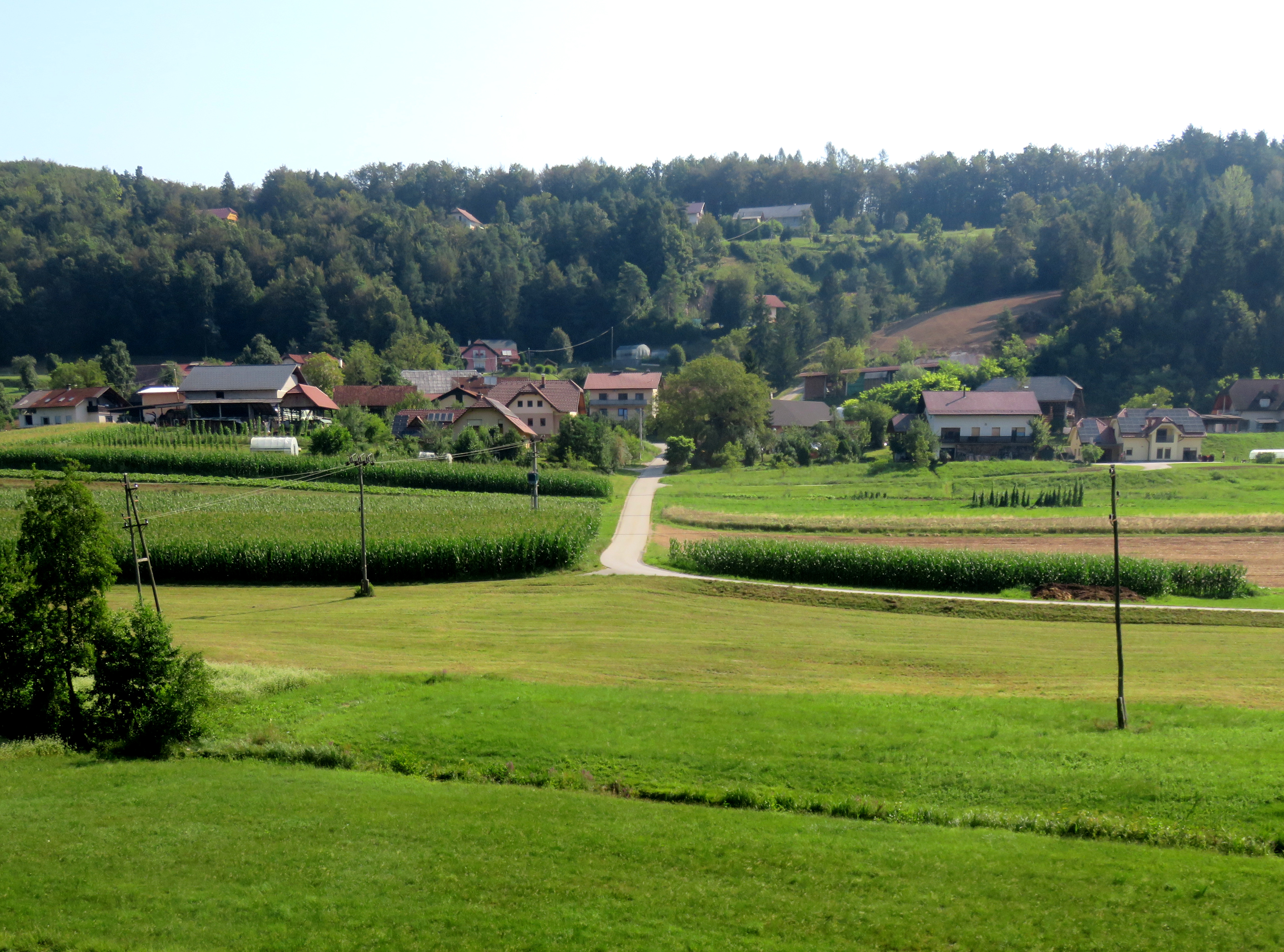

- Location in Slovenia
- Coordinates: 45°58′30.06″N 14°53′7.43″E
- Country: Slovenia
- Traditional region: Lower Carniola
- Statistical region: Central Slovenia
- Municipality: Ivančna Gorica

Area
  - Total: 0.63 km^{2} (0.24 sq mi)
- Elevation: 338 m (1,109 ft)

Population (2002)
  - Total: 48

Radanja Vas (pronounced [ɾaˈdaːnja ˈʋaːs]; Slovene: Radanja vas) is a small village near Šentvid pri Stični in the Municipality of Ivančna Gorica in central Slovenia. The area is part of the historical region of Lower Carniola. The municipality is now included in the Central Slovenia Statistical Region.

A small roadside chapel-shrine in the settlement is dedicated to the Virgin Mary and was built in the early 19th century.
