= Vrh pri Sobračah =

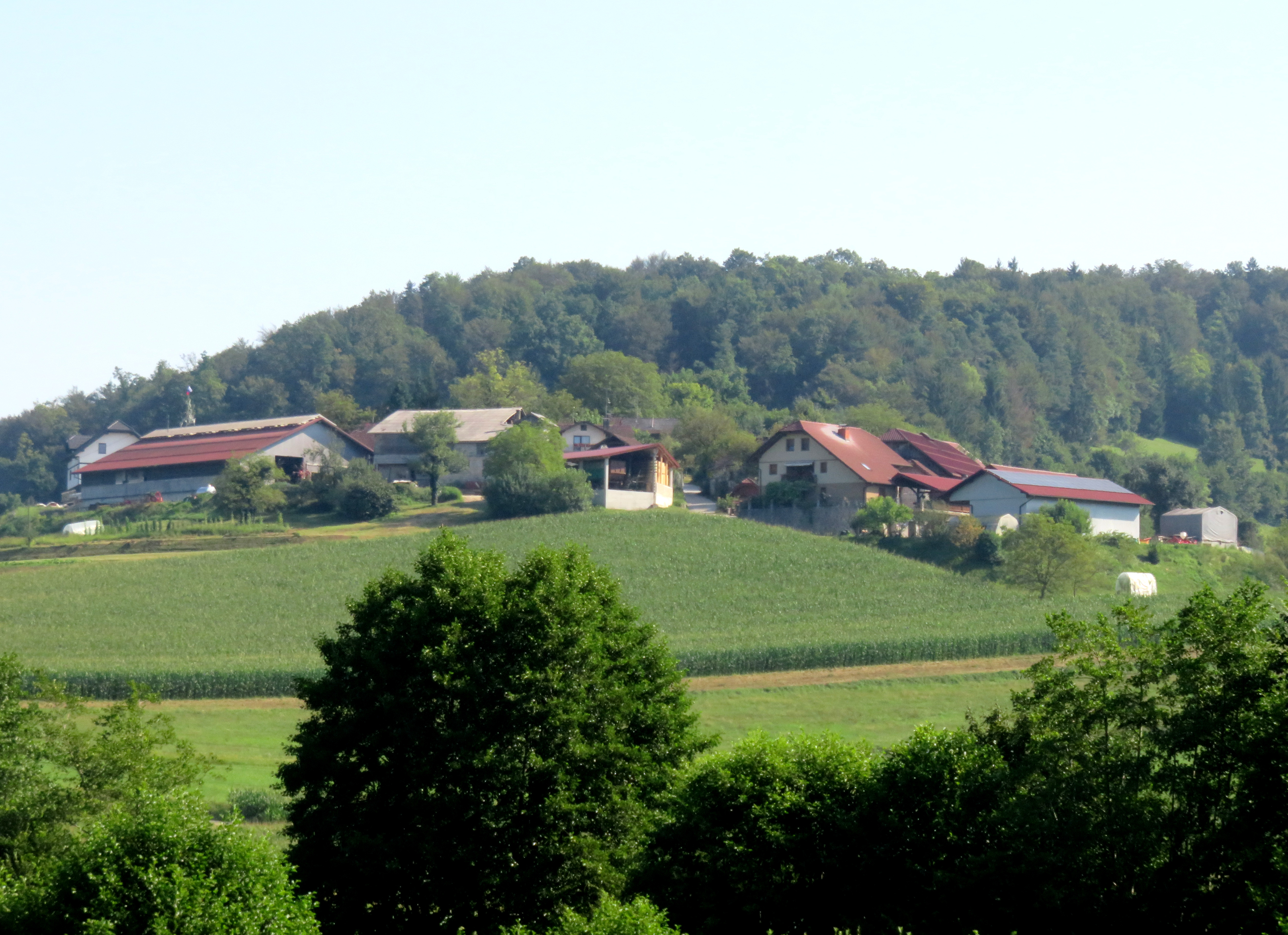

- Location in Slovenia
- Coordinates: 45°59′11.19″N 14°52′58.52″E
- Country: Slovenia
- Traditional region: Lower Carniola
- Statistical region: Central Slovenia
- Municipality: Ivančna Gorica

Area
  - Total: 1.07 km^{2} (0.41 sq mi)
- Elevation: 382 m (1,253 ft)

Population (2002)
  - Total: 26

Vrh pri Sobračah (in older sources also Vrh pri Subračah, German: Werch bei Subratsche) is a small settlement in the Municipality of Ivančna Gorica in central Slovenia. It lies just off the regional road leading through the Sava Hills (Slovene: Posavsko hribovje) from Ivančna Gorica towards Šmartno pri Litiji in the historical region of Lower Carniola. The municipality is now included in the Central Slovenia Statistical Region.
