= Sobrače =

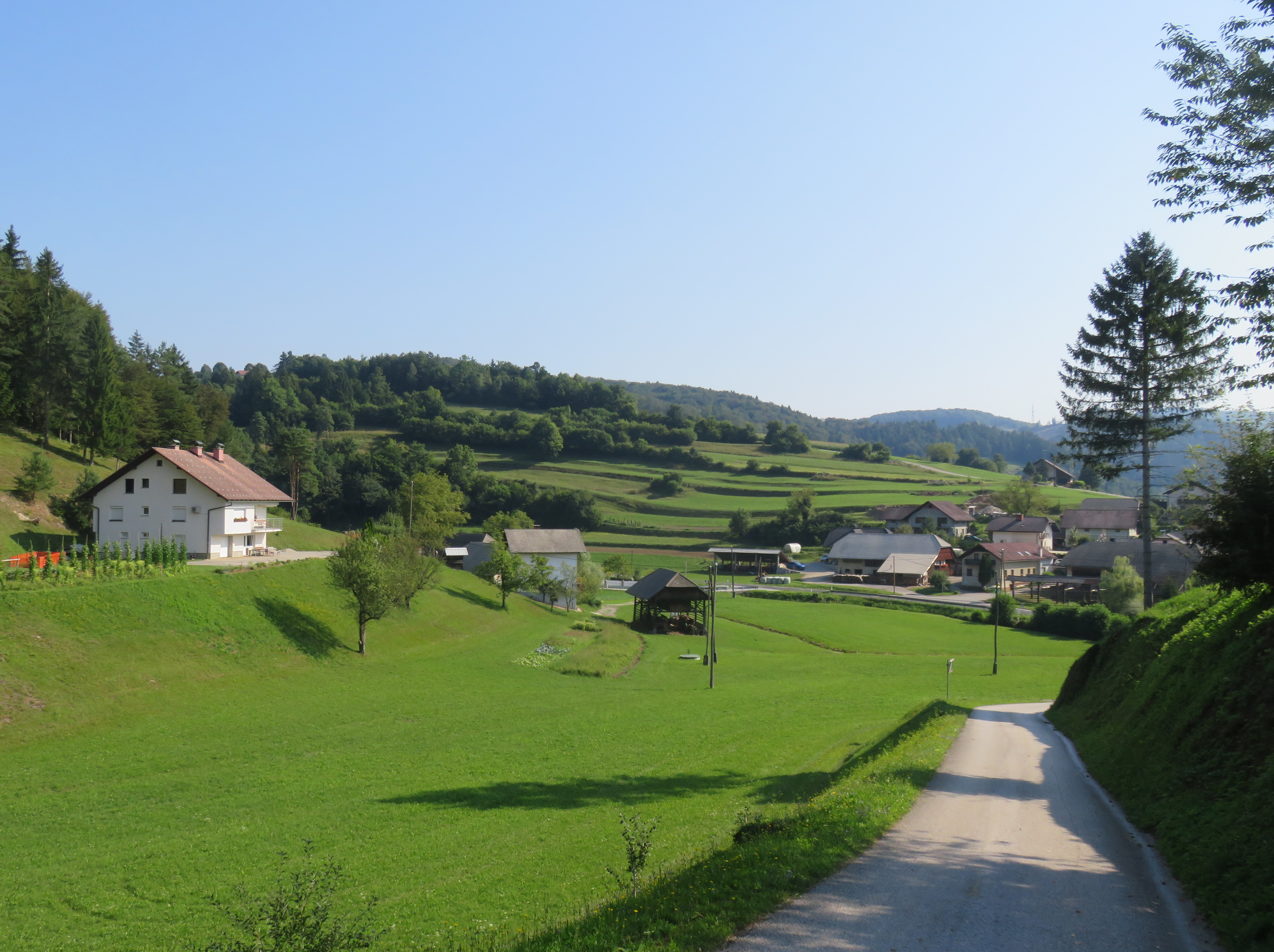

- Location in Slovenia
- Coordinates: 45°59′19.59″N 14°52′32.94″E
- Country: Slovenia
- Traditional region: Lower Carniola
- Statistical region: Central Slovenia
- Municipality: Ivančna Gorica

Area
  - Total: 1.45 km^{2} (0.56 sq mi)
- Elevation: 1.45 m (4.8 ft)

Population (2002)
  - Total: 59

Sobrače (pronounced [ˈsoːbɾatʃɛ]; in older sources also Subrače, German: Subratsche) is a village in the upper valley of the Temenica River in the Municipality of Ivančna Gorica in central Slovenia. The area is part of the historical region of Lower Carniola. The municipality is now included in the Central Slovenia Statistical Region.

== Church ==
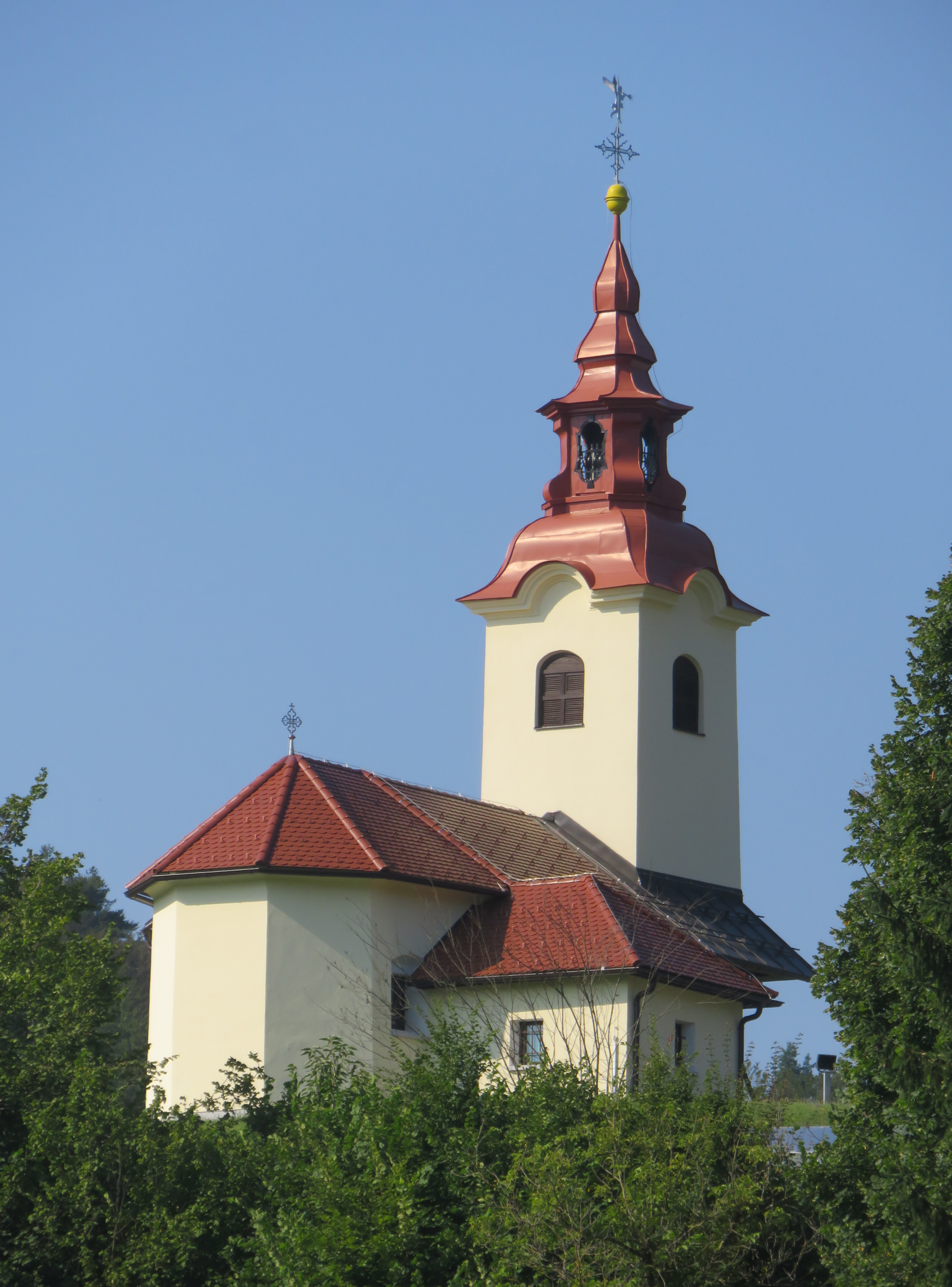
Saint Andrew's Church

The local church is dedicated to Saint Andrew and belongs to the Parish of Šentvid pri Stični. It dates to the 17th century.
