= Sadinja Vas, Ljubljana =

Sadinja Vas
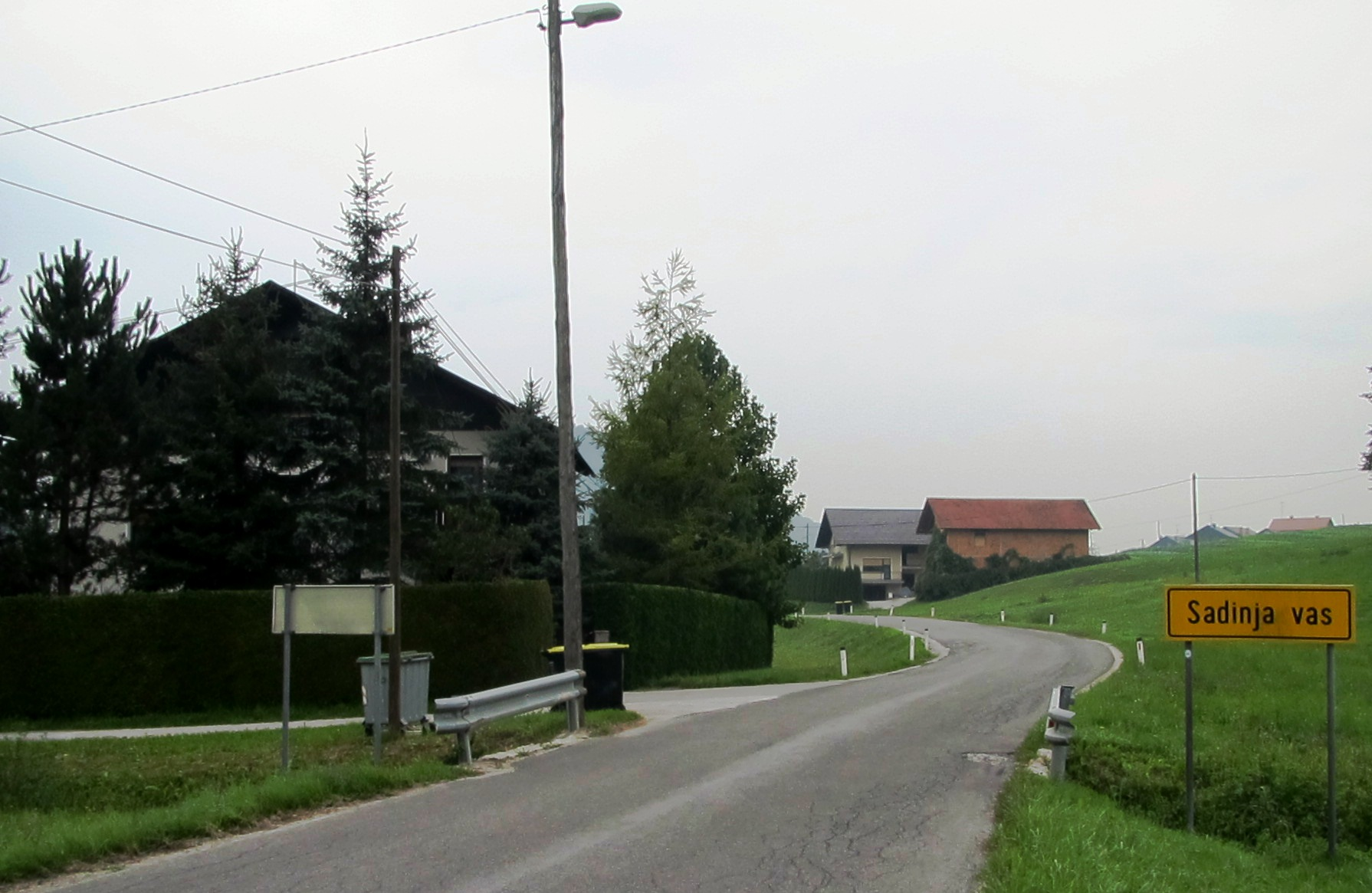
- Sadinja Vas

- Location in Slovenia
- Coordinates: 46°1′22.17″N 14°36′40.4″E
- Country: Slovenia
- Traditional region: Lower Carniola
- Statistical region: Central Slovenia
- Municipality: Ljubljana

Area
  - Total: 1.08 km^{2} (0.42 sq mi)
- Elevation: 299.2 m (982 ft)

Population (2002)
  - Total: 411
- Postal code: 1261

Sadinja Vas (pronounced [saˈdiːnja ˈʋaːs]; Slovene: Sadinja vas, also archaic Zadina Vas, German: Sadinawaß) is a settlement in the City Municipality of Ljubljana in central Slovenia. It is part of the traditional region of Lower Carniola and is now included with the rest of the municipality in the Central Slovenia Statistical Region.

== Name ==
The name of the settlement was first recorded in German in 1278 as Schephfendorff (Sephansdorf in 1313, Stewendorff in 1346). The Slovene name was first attested as Sadinabas in 1463 (and as Sadina vaſs in 1690). The Slovene name developed from *Sodinja vas 'village belonging to a sodij (village judge)', which is also confirmed by the Middle High German equivalent with schepfe 'member of the judicial bench' who assisted the lord of the estate in judicial matters. The village was known as Sadinawaß in German in the past.

== History ==
In 1940 and 1941 an underground Partisan printing press operated at house no. 33 in the village, commemorated by a plaque. The printing equipment for the workshop was manufactured in Celje by Janko Skvarča (a.k.a. Modras, 1915–1943). There was also a Partisan checkpoint in Sadinja Vas during the Second World War.

== Notable people ==
Notable people that were born or lived in Sadinja Vas include:

- Josip Sicherl (1860–1935), composer
