= Municipality of Trzin =

Municipality of Slovenia

Municipality of trzin Občina Trzin
- Municipality
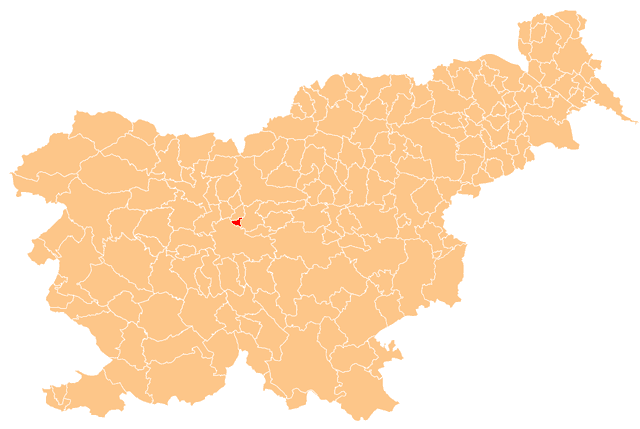
- Location of the Municipality of Trzin in Slovenia
- Coordinates: 46°07′30″N 14°33′00″E
- Country: Slovenia

Government
  - Mayor: Peter Ložar

Area
  - Total: 8.6 km^{2} (3.3 sq mi)

Population (July 1, 2018)
  - Total: 3,880
  - Density: 450/km^{2} (1,200/sq mi)
- Time zone: UTC+01 (CET)
  - Summer (DST): UTC+02 (CEST)
- Website: trzin.si

The Municipality of Trzin (pronounced [təɾˈzin] or [təɾˈziːn]; Slovene: Občina Trzin) is a municipality in the traditional region of Upper Carniola in central Slovenia. The seat of the municipality is the town of Trzin, which is also the only settlement in the municipality. Trzin became a municipality in 1998, when it was split from the Municipality of Domžale.
