= Central Slovenia Statistical Region =

Coordinates: 46°03′00″N 14°31′00″E

Central Slovenia Statistical Region osrednjeslovenska statistična regija
- Statistical region
- Municipalities: 26
- Largest city: Ljubljana

Area
  - Total: 2,555 km^{2} (986 sq mi)

Population (2020)
  - Total: 570,773
  - Density: 223.4/km^{2} (578.6/sq mi)

Statistics
  - Households: 212760
  - Employed: 195075
  - Registered unemployed: 2893
  - College/university students: 21620
  - Regional GDP (2019): EUR 18,011 bn (EUR 32,620 per capita)
- HDI (2022): 0.970 very high · 1st

The Central Slovenia Statistical Region (Slovene: osrednjeslovenska statistična regija) is a statistical region in central Slovenia.

== Geography ==
This is the second-largest region in terms of territory. It has a total area of 2,555 km^{2}, with a central position and good traffic connections in all directions, and the country's capital is located in it.

== Population ==
The area is the most densely populated statistical region in Slovenia, with the largest number of inhabitants. The population in 2020 was 570,773. It had the highest proportion of people between ages 25 and 64 with a post-secondary education.

== Cities and towns ==
The Central Slovenia Statistical Region includes 9 cities and towns, the largest of which is Ljubljana.

Rank	Name	Population (2021)
1.	Ljubljana	285,604
2.	Kamnik	13,902
3.	Domžale	13,102
4.	Logatec	9,947
5.	Vrhnika	8,889
6.	Grosuplje	7,607
7.	Mengeš	7,010
8.	Medvode	5,330
9.	Višnja Gora	1,135

== Municipalities ==
The Central Slovenia Statistical Region comprises the following 25 municipalities:

- Borovnica
- Brezovica
- Dobrepolje
- Dobrova-Polhov Gradec
- Dol pri Ljubljani
- Domžale
- Grosuplje
- Horjul
- Ig
- Ivančna Gorica
- Kamnik
- Komenda
- Ljubljana
- Logatec
- Log-Dragomer
- Lukovica
- Medvode
- Mengeš
- Moravče
- Škofljica
- Šmartno pri Litiji
- Trzin
- Velike Lašče
- Vodice
- Vrhnika

The Municipality of Litija was part of the region until January 2015; it became part of the Central Sava Statistical Region in 2015.

== Economy ==
As the economically most developed region, in 2012 it generated 27 times more gross domestic product than the Central Sava Statistical Region, or more than a third of the national GDP. In 2012 the region recorded 98 new companies per 10,000 population (the highest number of new companies was recorded in the Coastal–Karst Statistical Region; namely, 113 per 10,000 population). At the same time, this region had one of the highest five-year survival rates of new companies (55%). According to the labour migration index (126.0), this region was very labour oriented. That region's importance for employment is also confirmed by the fact that the number of jobs in the region is much larger than the number of employed persons living in it. Earnings of persons employed in this region are the highest in the country: in 2013 the average net earnings in the country amounted to EUR 997, whereas in this region they were over EUR 90 higher.

Employment structure: 69.7% services, 28.1% industry, 2.2% agriculture.

== Tourism ==
It attracts 13.2% of the total number of tourists in Slovenia, most being visitors from abroad who visit Ljubljana (90.7%).

== Transportation ==
- Length of motorways: 169 km
- Length of other roads: 3,540 km
