= Šentpavel =

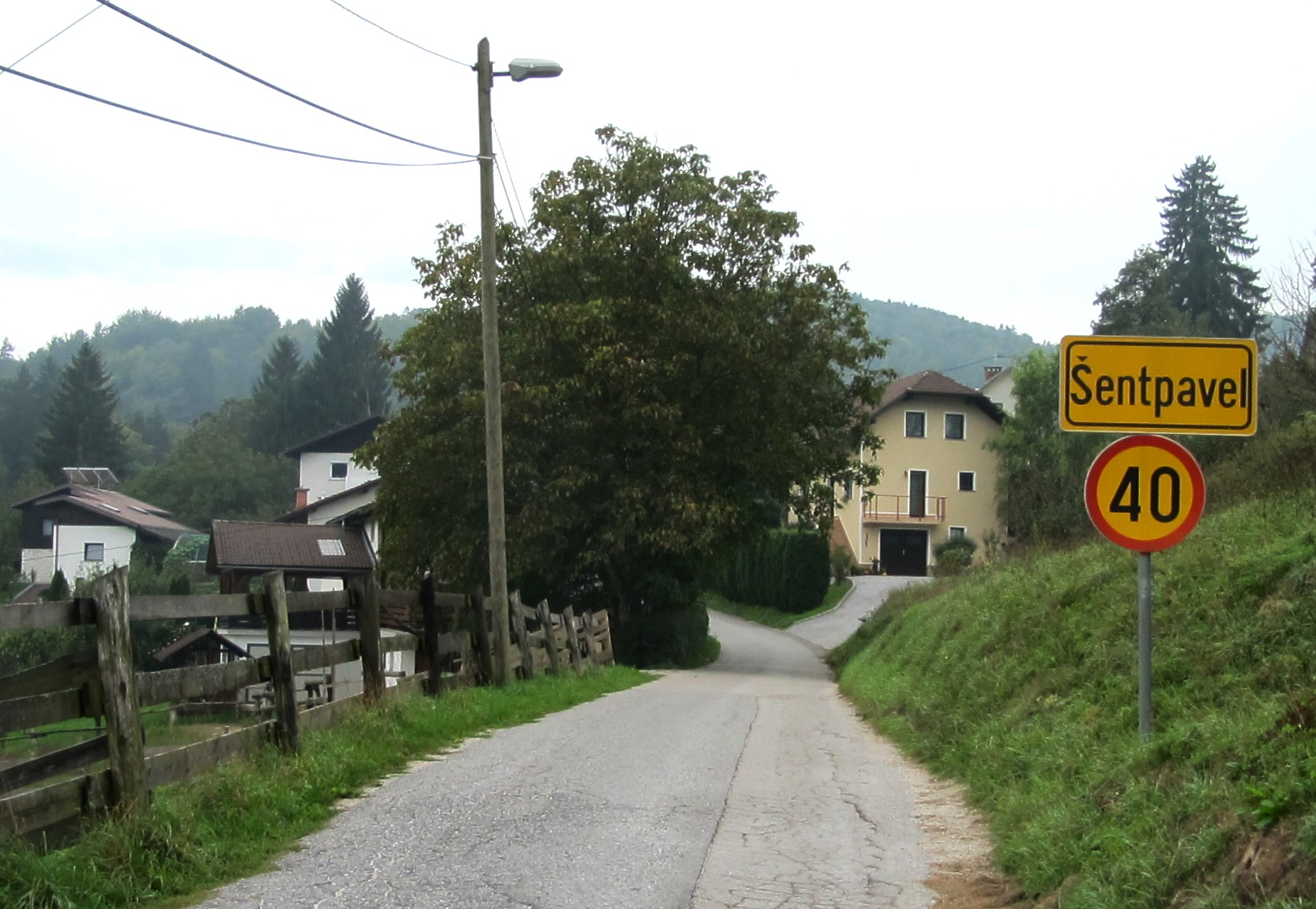
- Šentpavel

- Location in Slovenia
- Coordinates: 46°0′44.99″N 14°37′0.65″E
- Country: Slovenia
- Traditional region: Lower Carniola
- Statistical region: Central Slovenia
- Municipality: Ljubljana

Area
  - Total: 1.99 km^{2} (0.77 sq mi)
- Elevation: 371.3 m (1,218 ft)

Population (2019)
  - Total: 106
- Postal code: 1261

Šentpavel (pronounced [ʃɛntˈpaːʋəl] or [ʃəntˈpaːʋəl]; in older sources Sveti Paul or Šent Pavel, German: Sankt Paul) is a settlement in the hills southeast of the capital Ljubljana in central Slovenia. It belongs to the City Municipality of Ljubljana. It is part of the traditional region of Lower Carniola and is now included with the rest of the municipality in the Central Slovenia Statistical Region.

== Name ==
Šentpavel is named for the local church, dedicated to Saint Paul. The settlement is also known as Šempav in the local dialect (resulting in the demonym Šempavec and the adjective šempavski). The name of the settlement was changed from Šent Pavel to Šentpavel in 1955. In the past the German name was Sankt Paul.

== History ==
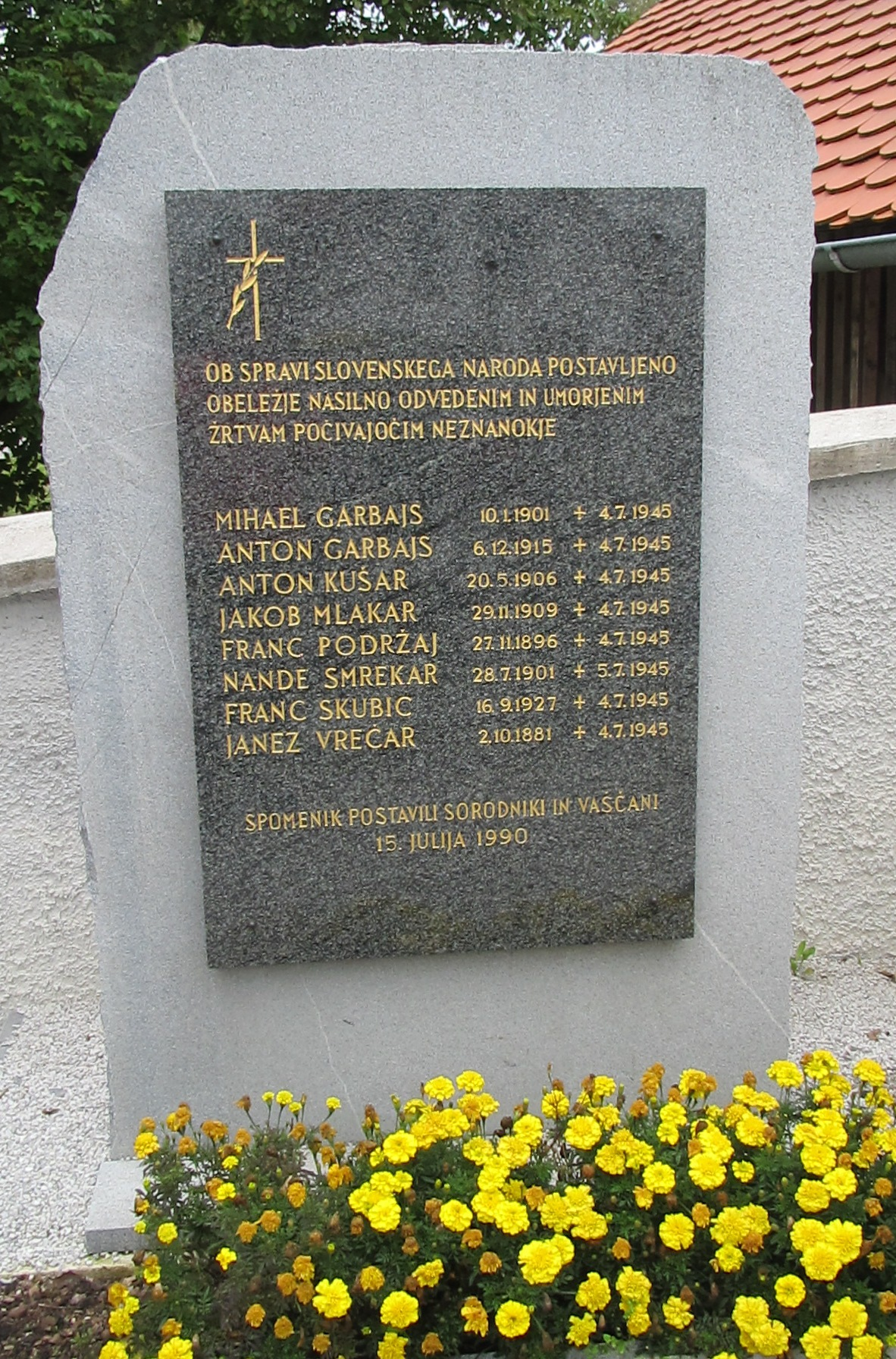
Memorial to 1945 killings

A level area on Molnik Hill, west-southwest of the village, suggests that a fortification may have stood here in the past. South of the village is the ruin of a house known as Anžek. It has a hole in the ground lined with stones where flax was scutched in the past. During the Second World War a Partisan group known as the Molnik Company (Slovene: Molniška četa) was stationed on Molnik Hill.

On 4 July 1945 a detachment of Yugoslav military police (KNOJ) abducted eight men from the village and murdered them in the forest between the Reka River and the hamlet of Razore in the village of Zagradišče. Their bodies were discovered buried in two pits in the woods. The villagers wanted to rebury them in the Šentpavel cemetery, but the bodies were taken away by the authorities and reburied anonymously, presumably in a mass grave at Saint Ulrich's Church in the Ljubljana neighborhood of Dobrunje. A memorial to the victims was erected in the village cemetery on 15 July 1990.

== Church ==
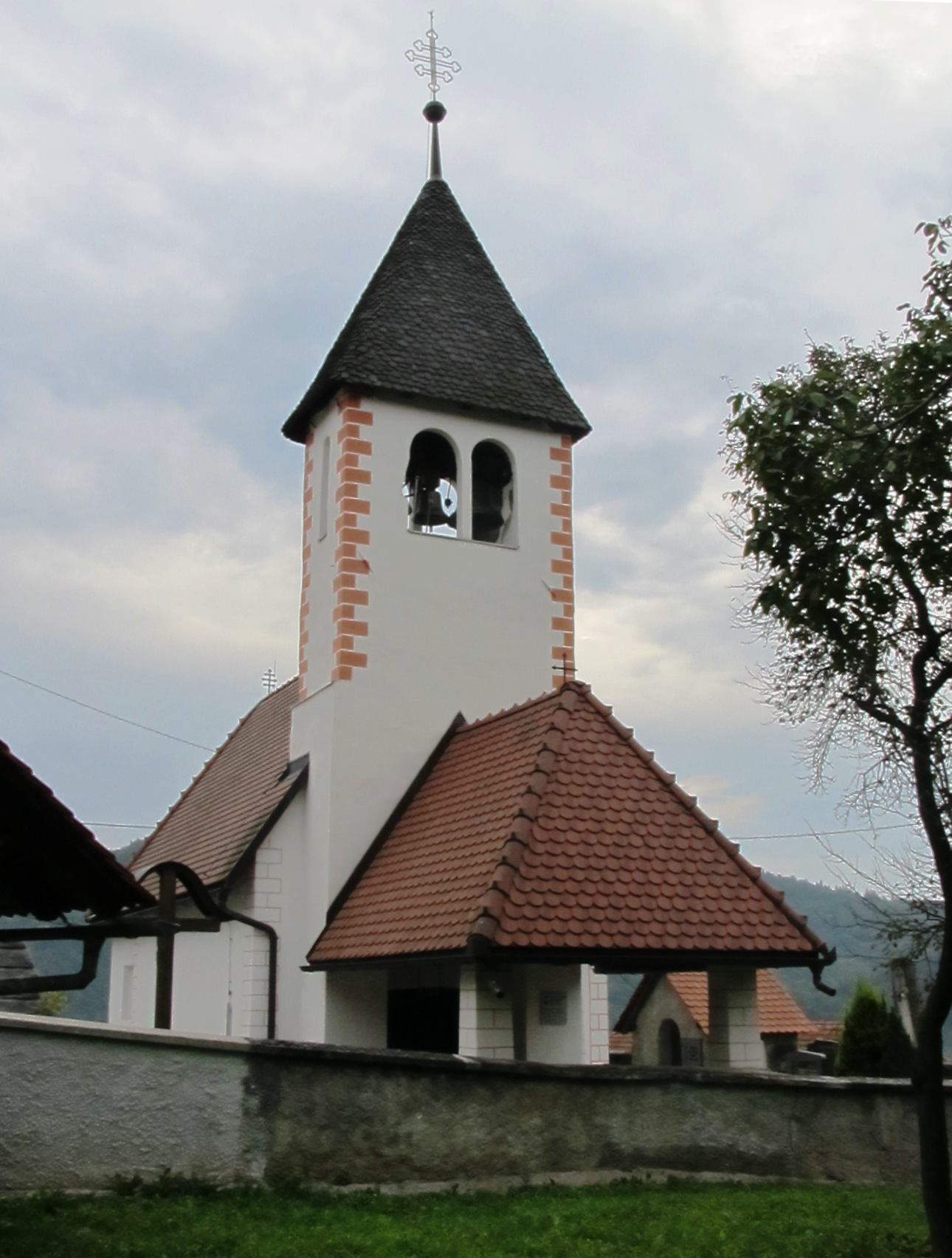
Saint Paul's Church

The local church is dedicated to Saint Paul and belongs to the Parish of Sostro. It is a single-nave church with an apse with late Gothic painting. Its architecture attests to a medieval origin. It has a bell-gable, a wooden portico, and a walled cemetery. It was remodeled in the 17th century and the main altar with a painting of Saint Paul was created in 1878 by Štefan Šubic (1820–1884). The chancel was rebuilt and painted in 1668. The walls are decorated with remnants of images of the twelve apostles, and winged symbols representing the four evangelists decorate the vault. A side altar dedicated to Saint Wolfgang dates from the end of the 17th century.

== Notable people ==
Notable people that were born or lived in Šentpavel include:

- Jerica Zemljan (1879–1942), writer and household economics teacher
