= Veliko Trebeljevo =

Settlement in Slovenia

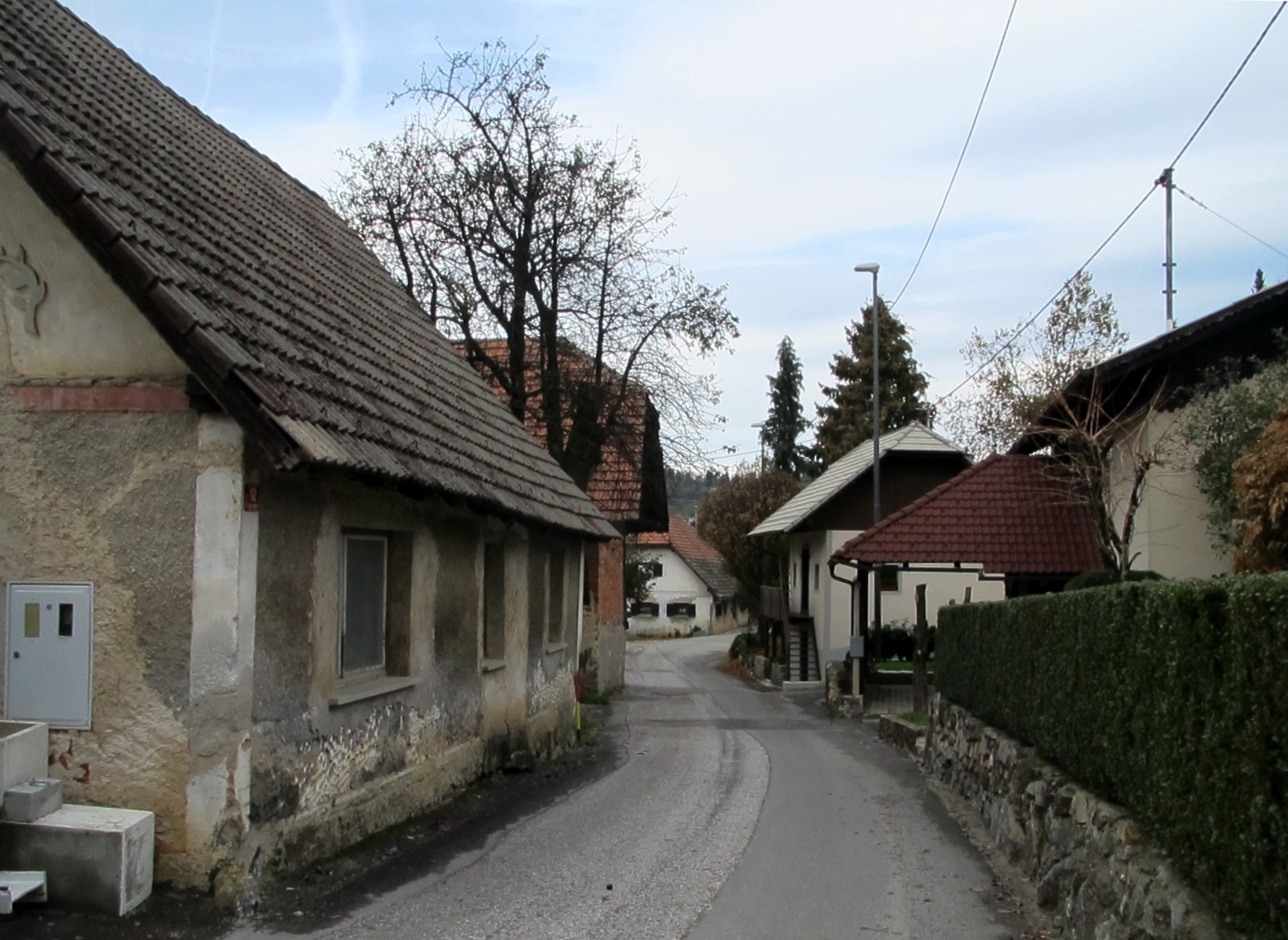
- Veliko Trebeljevo

- Location in Slovenia
- Coordinates: 46°0′40.39″N 14°44′19.53″E
- Country: Slovenia
- Traditional region: Lower Carniola
- Statistical region: Central Slovenia
- Municipality: Ljubljana

Area
  - Total: 0.76 km^{2} (0.29 sq mi)
- Elevation: 555 m (1,821 ft)

Population (2002)
  - Total: 77
- Postal code: 1000

Veliko Trebeljevo (pronounced [ˈʋeːlikɔ tɾɛbɛˈljeːʋɔ]; German: Großtrebeleu) is a settlement in the hills east of the capital Ljubljana in central Slovenia. It belongs to the City Municipality of Ljubljana. It is part of the traditional region of Lower Carniola and is now included with the rest of the municipality in the Central Slovenia Statistical Region.

== Church ==
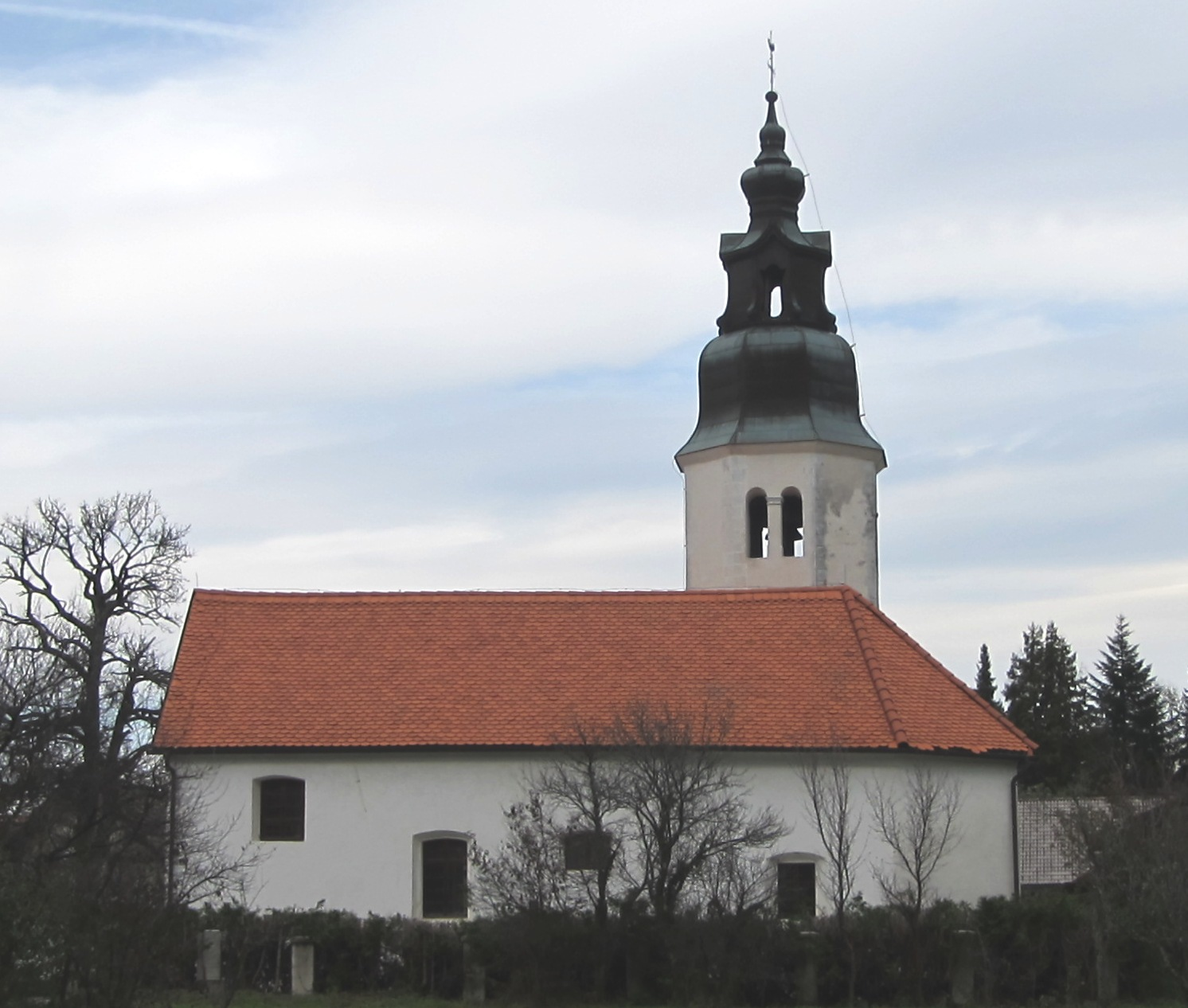
Holy Cross Church

The local church is dedicated to the Holy Cross and belongs to the Parish of Prežganje. It was originally a medieval chapel that was extended in 1869 when a nave was added. The interior furnishings, including the altar, the Stations of the Cross, and the organ, date from the 1869 renovation. The church was established by monks from Stična because the village once belonged to the jurisdiction of the Stična monastery.
