= Ravno Brdo =

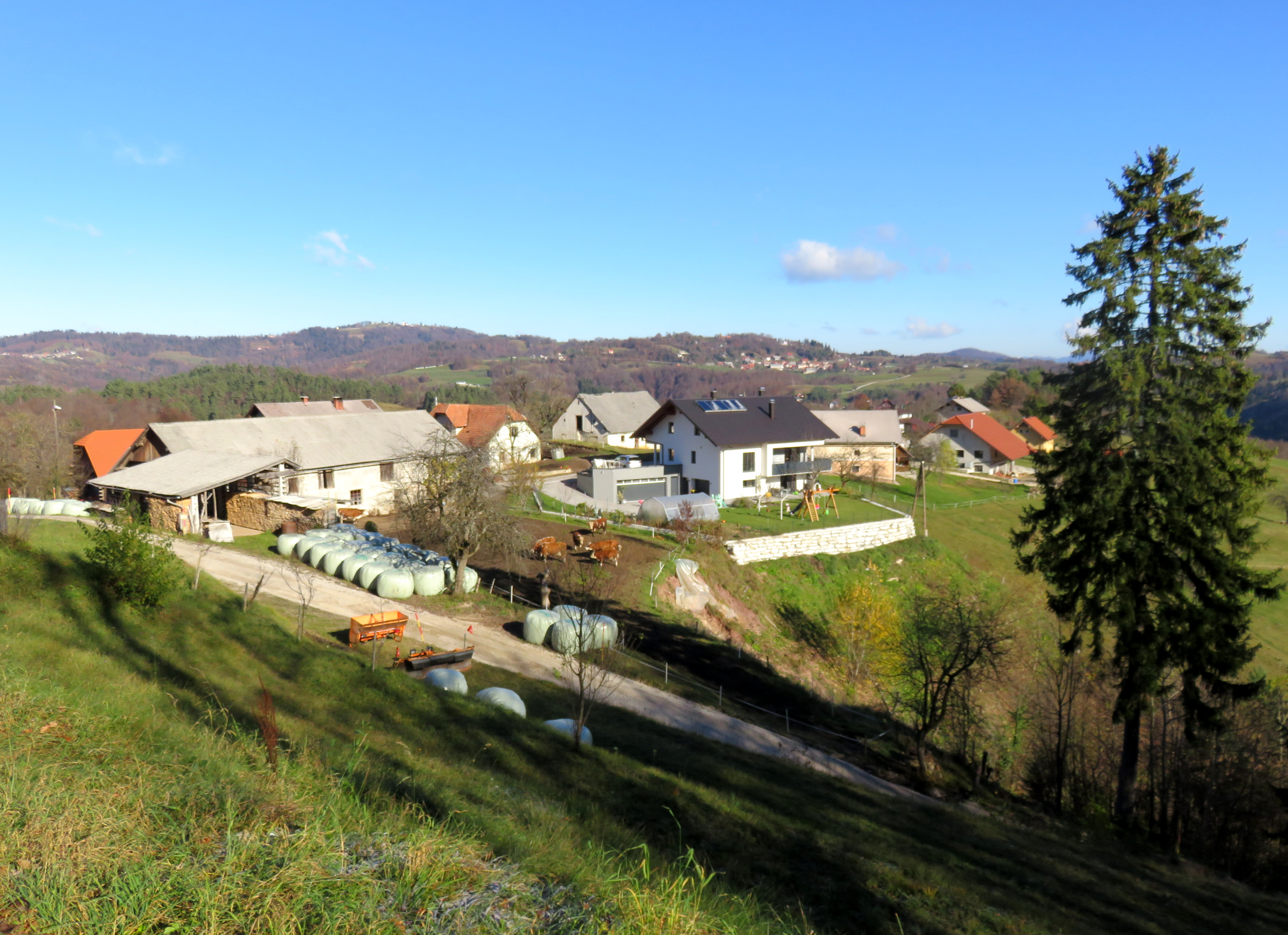

- Location in Slovenia
- Coordinates: 46°0′56.21″N 14°41′48.35″E
- Country: Slovenia
- Traditional region: Lower Carniola
- Statistical region: Central Slovenia
- Municipality: Ljubljana

Area
  - Total: 2.34 km^{2} (0.90 sq mi)
- Elevation: 573.3 m (1,881 ft)

Population (2019)
  - Total: 60
  - Density: 26/km^{2} (66/sq mi)
- Postal code: 1000

Ravno Brdo (pronounced [ˈɾaːu̯nɔ ˈbəɾdɔ]) is a dispersed settlement in the hills east of Ljubljana in Slovenia. It belongs to the City Municipality of Ljubljana. It is part of the traditional region of Lower Carniola, and it is now included with the rest of the municipality in the Central Slovenia Statistical Region.

== Cultural heritage ==
A church dedicated to Saint Bartholomew formerly stood in the hamlet of Hribar and served parishioners in the Besnica Valley. In addition to the ruins of the church, the location is also an archaeological site with graves from the late Roman era.
