= Urban Municipality of Ljubljana =

Urban municipality of Slovenia

Urban Municipality of Ljubljana Mestna občina Ljubljana
- Urban municipality
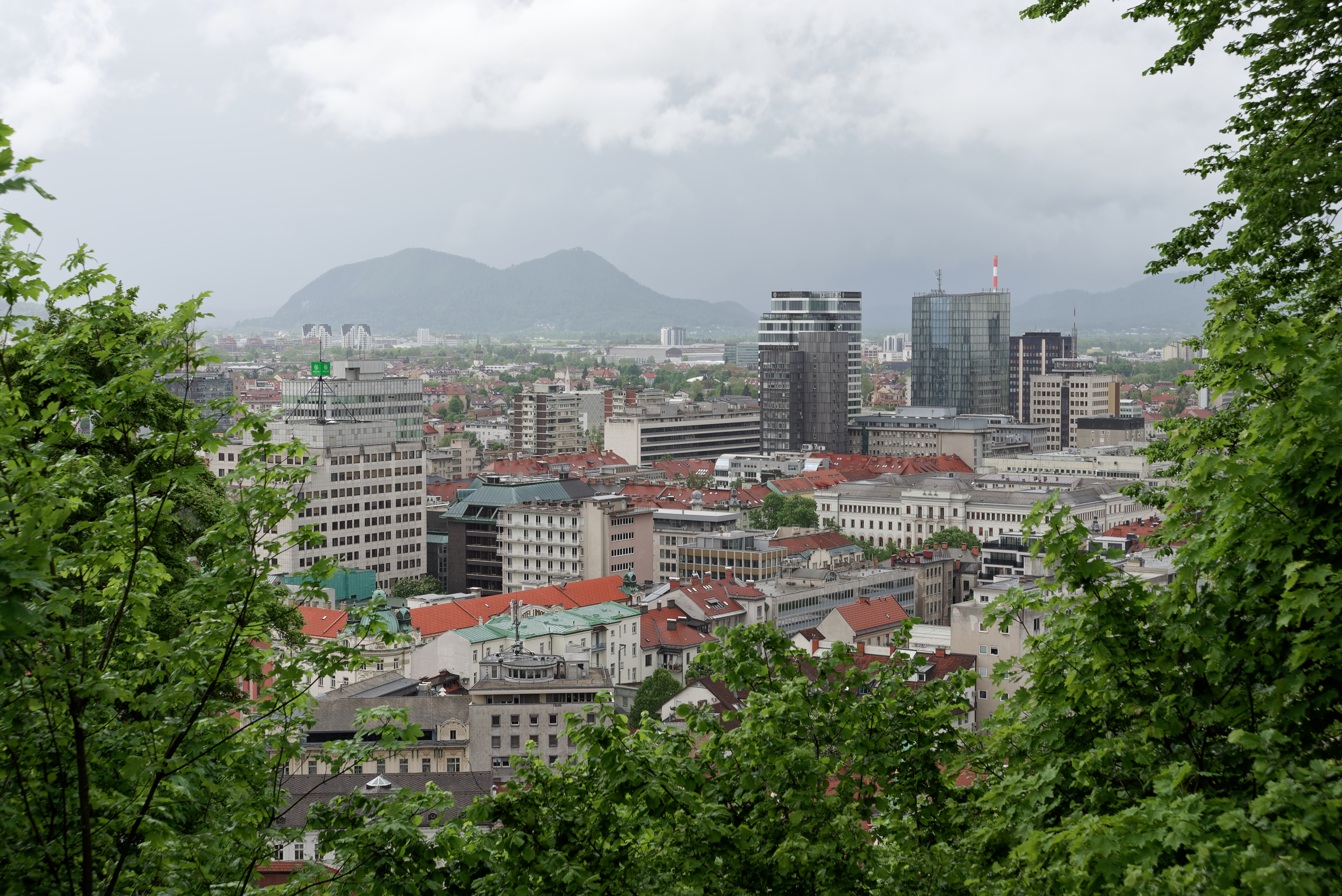
- Ljubljana's old city centre

- Coat of arms

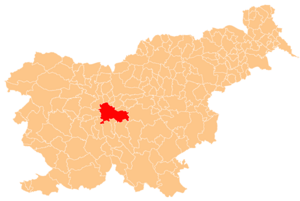
- Location of the Municipality of Ljubljana in Slovenia
- Coordinates: 46°03′N 14°31′E
- Country: Slovenia

Government
  - Mayor: Zoran Janković (Zoran Janković List)

Area
  - Total: 275 km^{2} (106 sq mi)

Population (1 July 2024)
  - Total: 297,575
  - Density: 1,080/km^{2} (2,800/sq mi)
- Time zone: UTC+01 (CET)
  - Summer (DST): UTC+02 (CEST)
- Website: www.ljubljana.si

The Urban Municipality of Ljubljana (pronounced [ljuˈbljaːna]), also the City of Ljubljana (Slovene: Mestna občina Ljubljana, acronym MOL) is one of twelve city and metropolitan municipalities in Slovenia. Its seat is Ljubljana, the largest and capital city of Slovenia. As of December 2021, its mayor is Zoran Janković.

== Administrative division ==
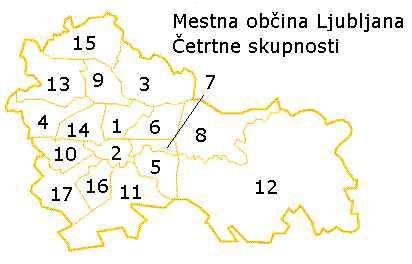
Districts of the Urban Municipality of Ljubljana

The Urban Municipality of Ljubljana comprises 17 districts (Slovene singular: četrtna skupnost): the Bežigrad District, Center District, Črnuče District, Dravlje District, Golovec District, Jarše District, Moste District, Polje District, Posavje District, Rožnik District, Rudnik District, Sostro District, Šentvid District, Šiška District, Šmarna Gora District, Trnovo District, and Vič District.

These are represented by district councils (Slovene singular: svet četrtne skupnosti or četrtni svet).

== Economy ==
The budget of MOL was 346,505,748 euros for 2011. It was shaped by the sale of land lot and the construction of the Stožice Sports Park. With 125 million euros of debt, MOL was the most indebted Slovenian municipality in April 2010.

== Holiday ==
Since 1945, the holiday of the City of Ljubljana has been celebrated on 9 May. On that day, the liberation of the city from German occupation during World War II was announced in 1945. In 1964, the holiday was added to the statute of the municipality as "the day of the liberation of Ljubljana in the victorious national liberation war 1941–1945". Since 1995, it has been known as "the day of freedom and peace". In 1995, despite disagreements, 14 April was added to the statute as the date of the first mention of Ljubljana in written sources, based on a document from 1243.

The holiday on 14 April was much less known than the holiday on 9 May. In February 2011, the mayor presented a proposal to only celebrate 9 May to the municipal council, because it was inexpedient for Ljubljana to be the only municipality in Slovenia to celebrate two days as municipal holidays, and to celebrate the municipal holiday on the date of the first mention, which may change with time. The proposal was passed by the municipal council and became valid in February 2012. Since then, the only holiday of the Urban Municipality of Ljubljana has been 9 May, the day of freedom and peace.

== Settlements ==
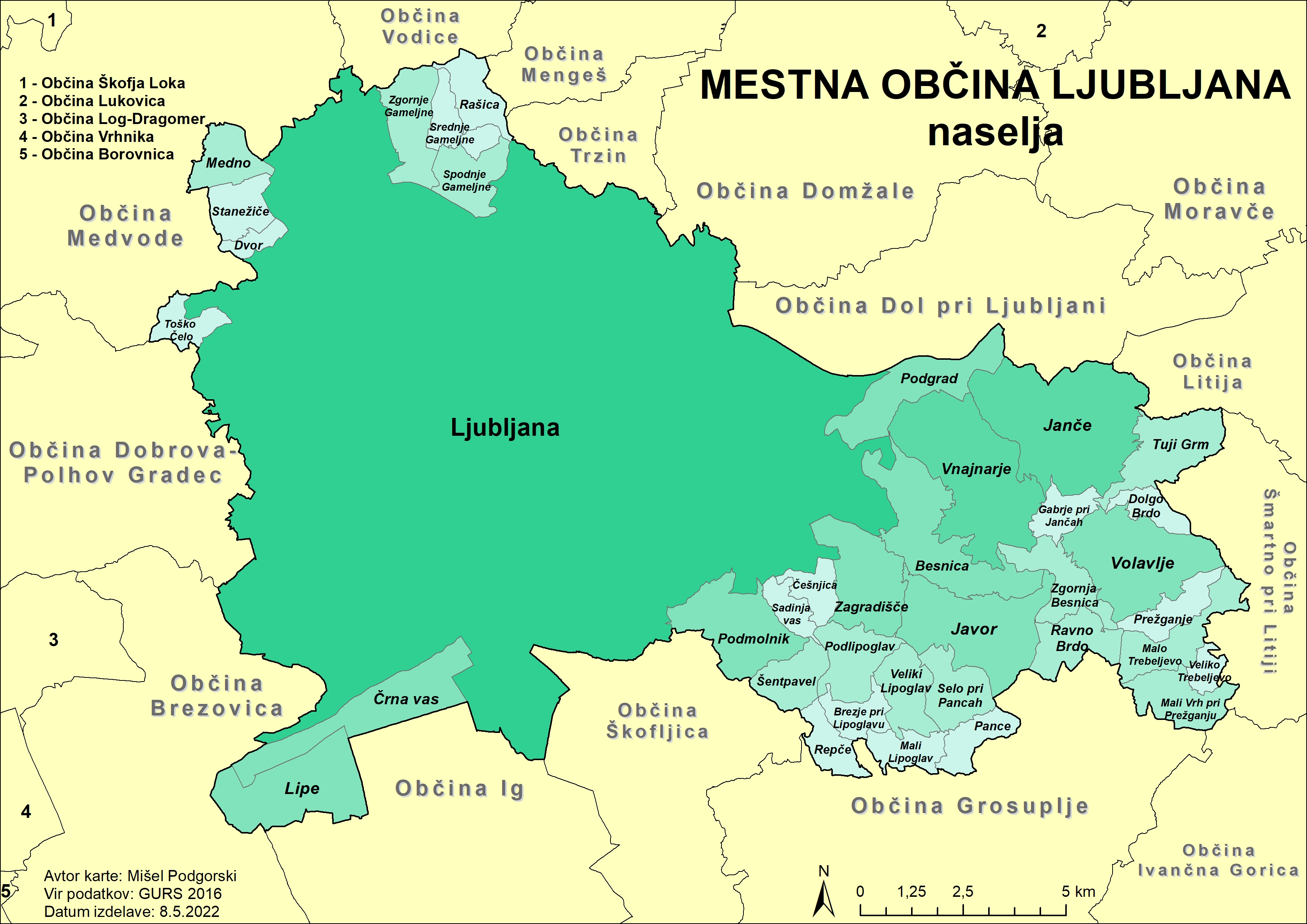
Villages in the municipality

In addition to the municipal seat of Ljubljana, the municipality also includes the following settlements:

- Besnica
- Brezje pri Lipoglavu
- Dolgo Brdo
- Dvor
- Češnjica
- Črna Vas
- Gabrje pri Jančah
- Janče
- Javor
- Lipe
- Mali Lipoglav
- Mali Vrh pri Prežganju
- Malo Trebeljevo
- Medno
- Pance, Ljubljana
- Podgrad
- Podlipoglav
- Podmolnik
- Prežganje
- Ravno Brdo
- Rašica
- Repče
- Sadinja Vas
- Selo pri Pancah
- Spodnje Gameljne
- Srednje Gameljne
- Stanežiče
- Šentpavel
- Toško Čelo
- Tuji Grm
- Veliki Lipoglav
- Veliko Trebeljevo
- Vnajnarje
- Volavlje
- Zagradišče
- Zgornja Besnica
- Zgornje Gameljne
