= Selo pri Pancah =

Settlement in central Slovenia

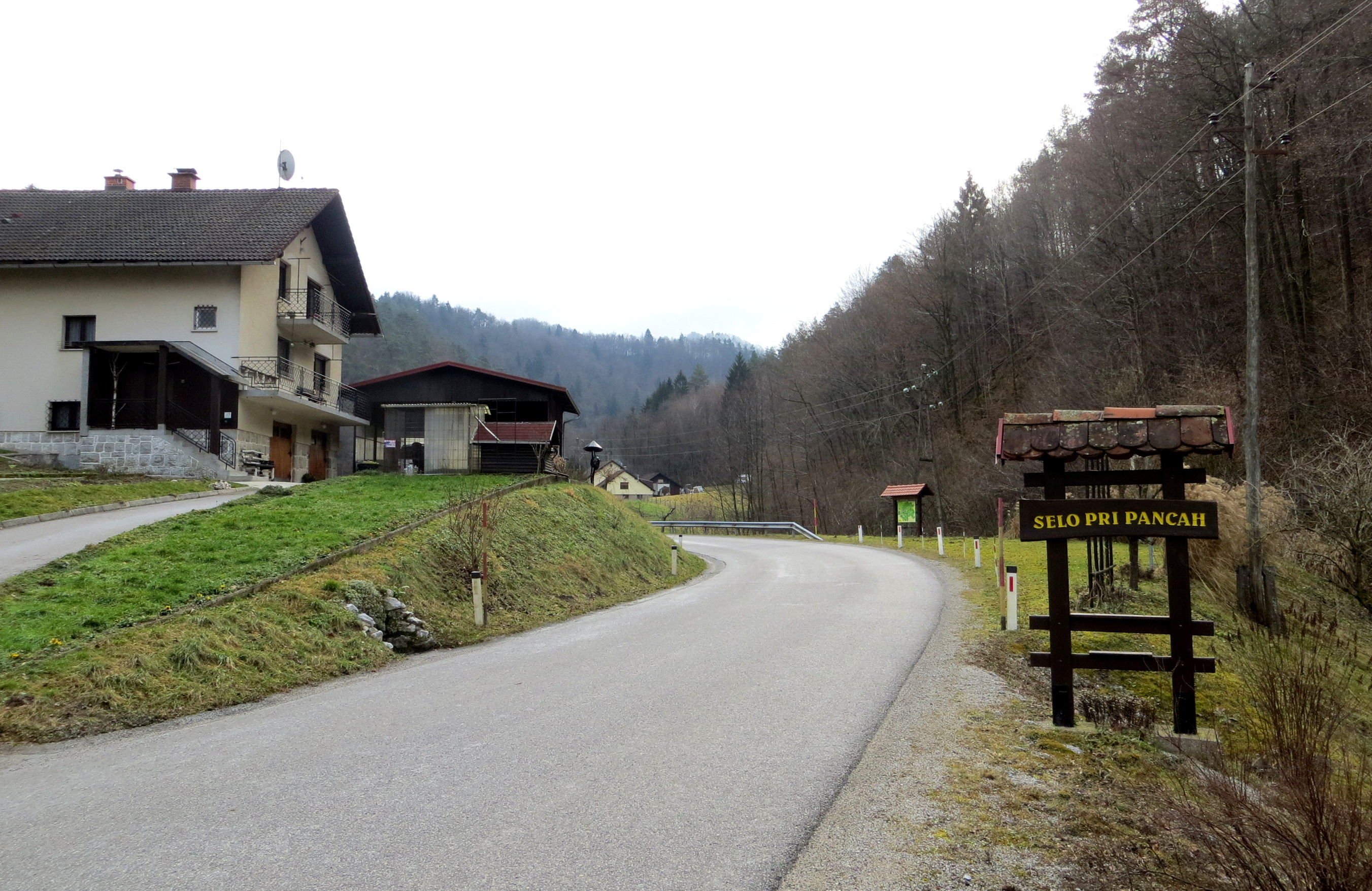

- Location in Slovenia
- Coordinates: 46°0′8.53″N 14°39′27.31″E
- Country: Slovenia
- Traditional region: Lower Carniola
- Statistical region: Central Slovenia
- Municipality: Ljubljana

Area
  - Total: 2.39 km^{2} (0.92 sq mi)
- Elevation: 464.3 m (1,523 ft)

Population (2002)
  - Total: 58
- Postal code: 1261

Selo pri Pancah (pronounced [ˈsɛːlɔ pɾi ˈpaːntsax]; in older sources also Sela pri Pancih, German: Sela bei Pance) is a small settlement in the City Municipality of Ljubljana in central Slovenia. It lies in the hills southeast of the capital Ljubljana. The area is part of the traditional region of Lower Carniola and is now included with the rest of the municipality in the Central Slovenia Statistical Region.

== Mass graves ==
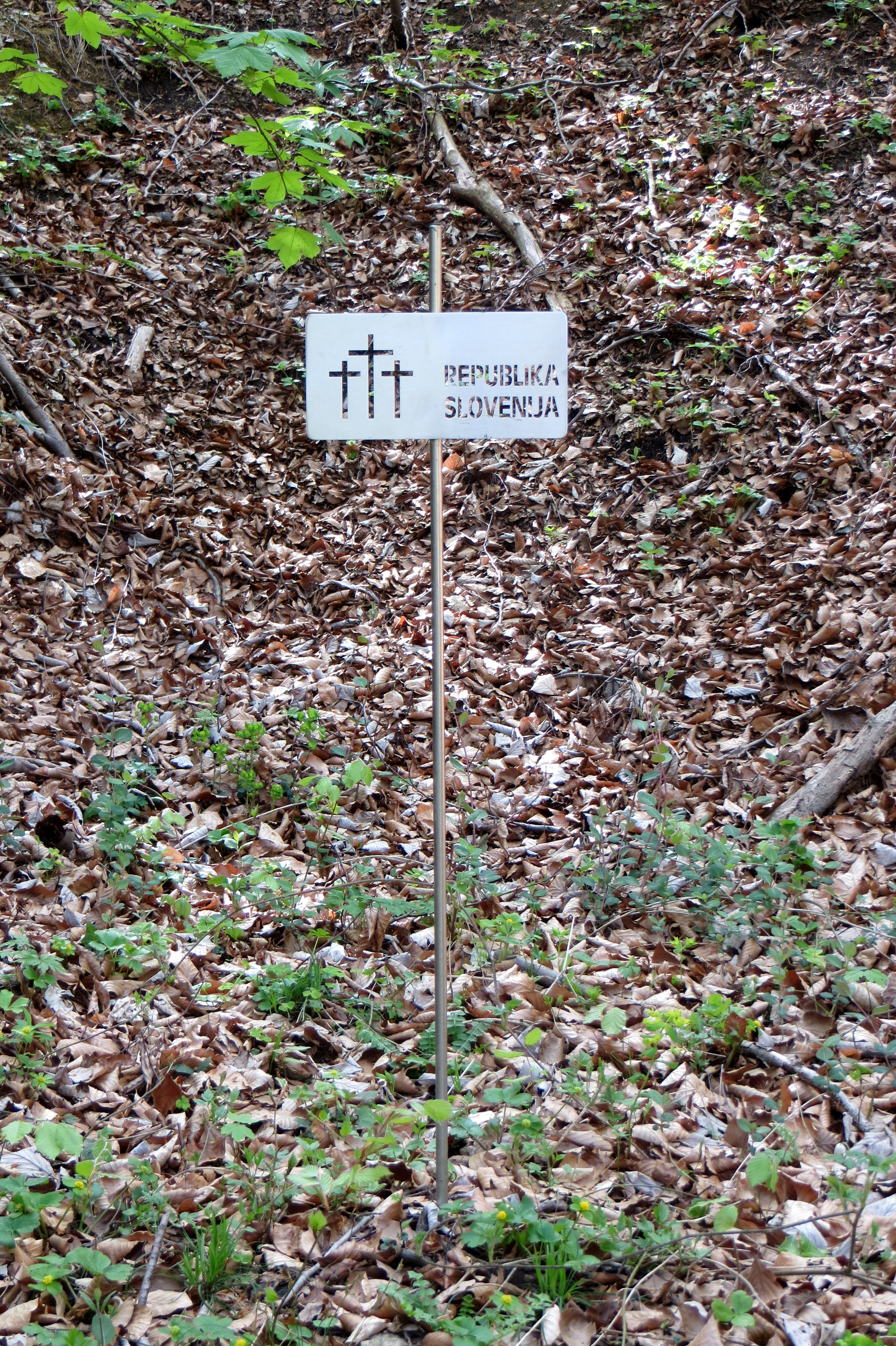
One of the excavated Vodice graves

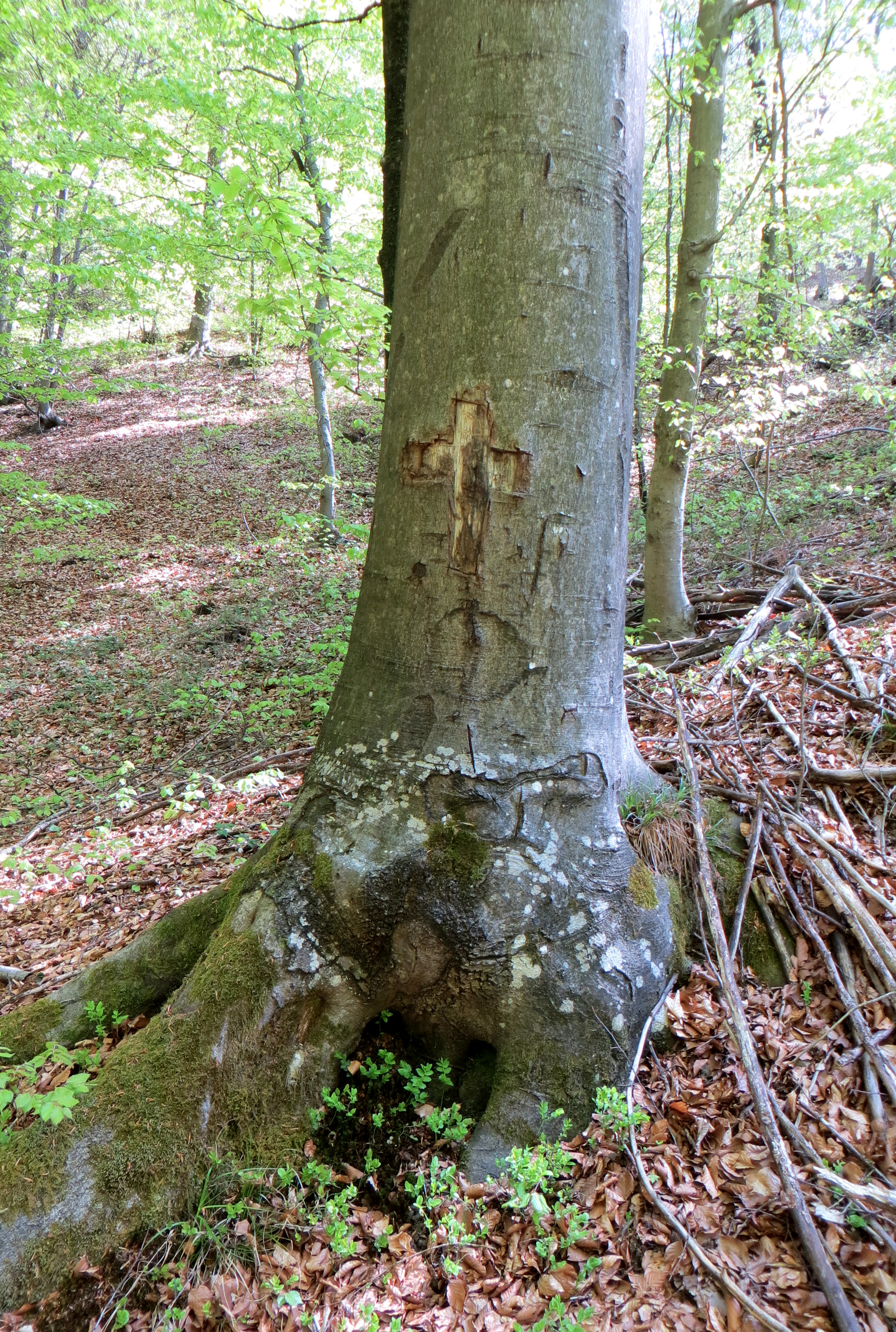
A marked tree at the Vodice graves

Mass graves in Selo pri Pancah

Selo pri Pancah is the site of 11 known mass graves associated with the Second World War. They contain the remains of Slovene civilians that were accused of spying and were murdered by the Partisans in spring 1942. The Vodice 1–10 mass graves (Slovene: Grobišče Vodice 1–10) are located in the woods northeast of the village. The Cirje 1 Mass Grave (Grobišče Cirje 1), also known as Miha's Hill Mass Grave (Grobišče Miha hrib), is located on the slope of Miha's Hill (Mihov hrib) on the left bank of the Pance River (Panška reka).
