= Gabrje pri Jančah =

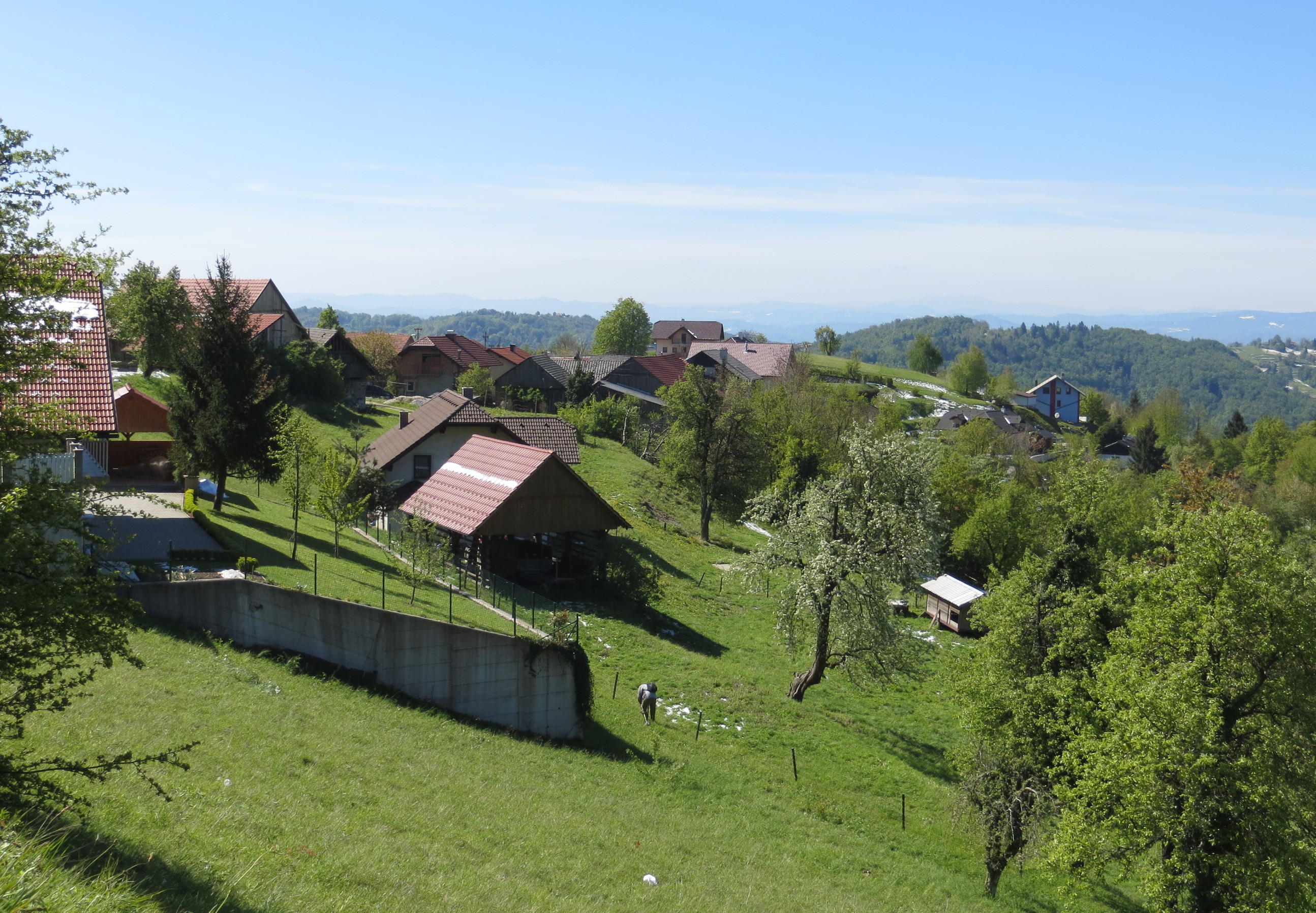

- Location in Slovenia
- Coordinates: 46°2′43.74″N 14°41′43.58″E
- Country: Slovenia
- Traditional region: Lower Carniola
- Statistical region: Central Slovenia
- Municipality: Ljubljana

Area
  - Total: 1.38 km^{2} (0.53 sq mi)
- Elevation: 647.2 m (2,123 ft)

Population (2002)
  - Total: 85
- Postal code: 1000

Gabrje pri Jančah (pronounced [ˈɡaːbəɾjɛ pɾi ˈjaːntʃax]; in older sources also Gabrije) is a settlement in the hills east of Ljubljana in central Slovenia. It belongs to the City Municipality of Ljubljana. It is part of the traditional region of Lower Carniola and is now included with the rest of the municipality in the Central Slovenia Statistical Region.

== Name ==
The name of the settlement was changed from Gabrje to Gabrje pri Jančah in 1953.
