= Tuji Grm =

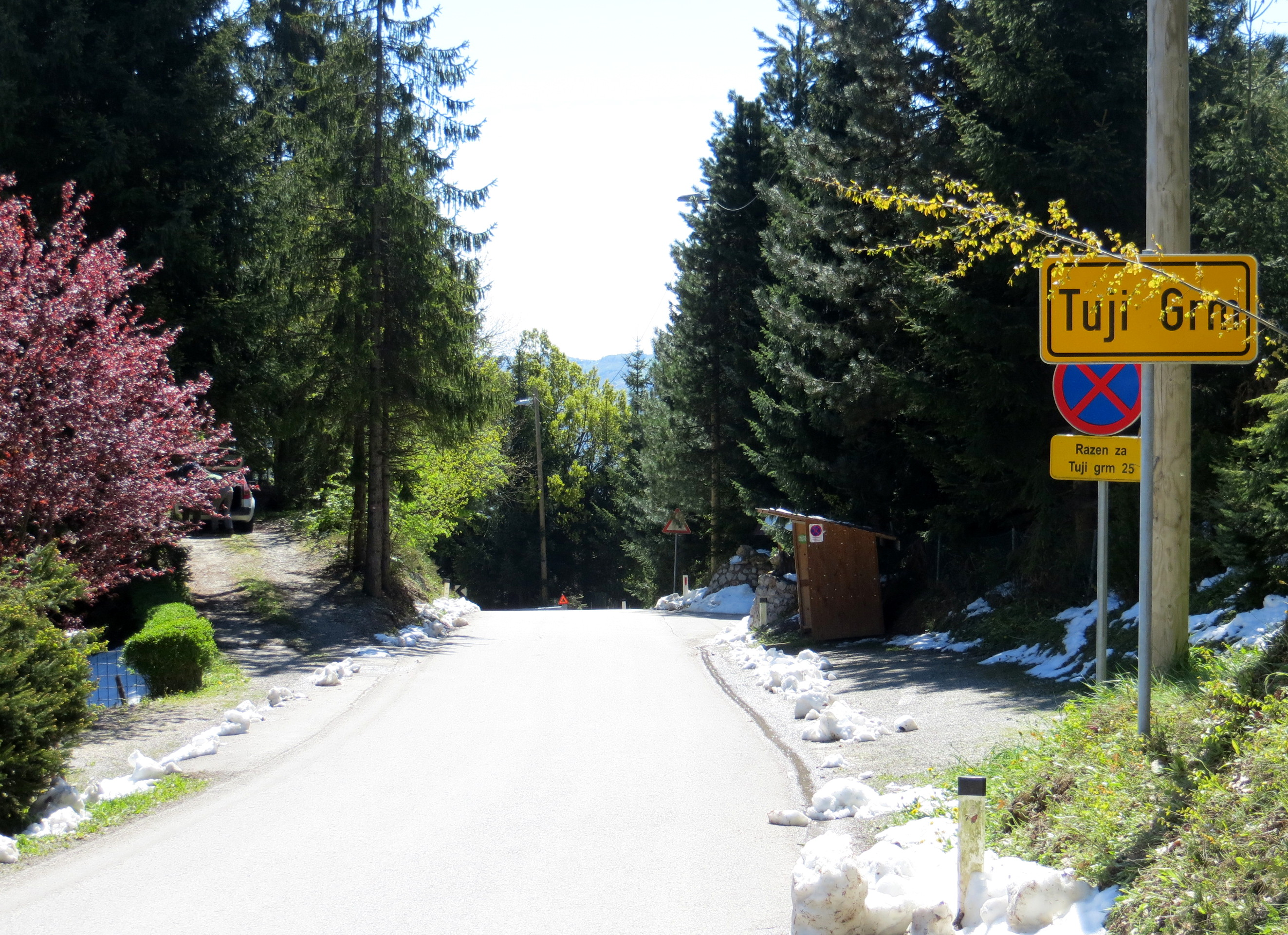

- Location in Slovenia
- Coordinates: 46°3′7.29″N 14°43′12.32″E
- Country: Slovenia
- Traditional region: Lower Carniola
- Statistical region: Central Slovenia
- Municipality: Ljubljana

Area
  - Total: 3.47 km^{2} (1.34 sq mi)
- Elevation: 704.1 m (2,310 ft)

Population (2002)
  - Total: 57
- Postal code: 1260

Tuji Grm (pronounced [ˈtuːji ˈɡəɾm]; in older sources also Ptuj Grm, German: Tuigerm) is a dispersed settlement in the hills south of the Sava River east of the capital Ljubljana in central Slovenia. It belongs to the City Municipality of Ljubljana. The area is part of the traditional region of Lower Carniola. It is now included with the rest of the municipality in the Central Slovenia Statistical Region.

== History ==
A prehistoric fortress stood west of the village on Mance Peak (Slovene: Mancin vrh, 747 m). This may have also been the site of Turner Castle (Turnerski grad), no trace of which remains today. During the Second World War there was an engagement between the Partisans and German forces at Tuji Grm on 22 May 1942. On 27 October 1944 German forces burned the village.
