= Češnjica, Ljubljana =

Češnjica
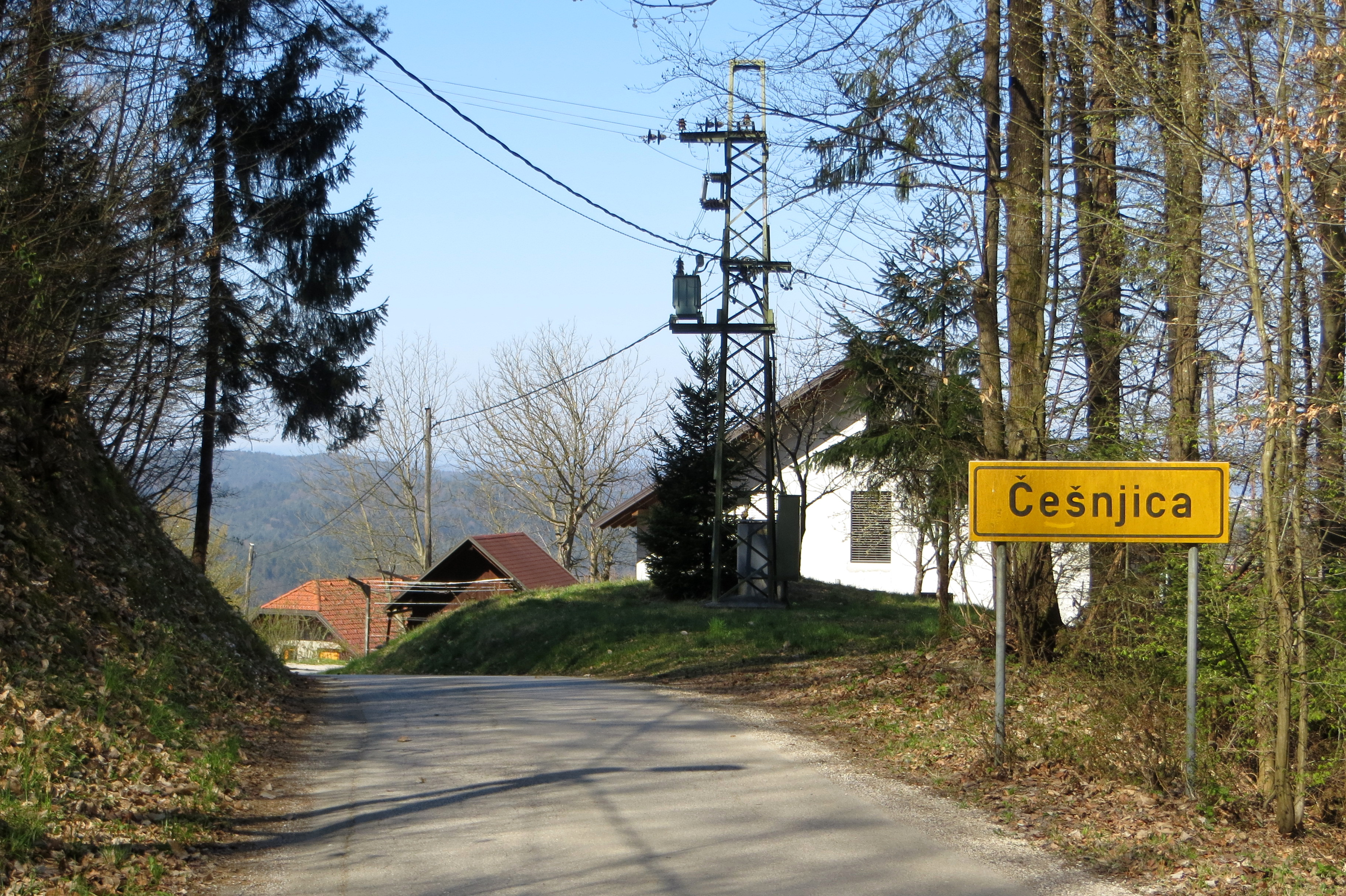

- Location in Slovenia
- Coordinates: 46°1′49.15″N 14°37′9.51″E
- Country: Slovenia
- Traditional region: Lower Carniola
- Statistical region: Central Slovenia
- Municipality: Ljubljana

Area
  - Total: 1.27 km^{2} (0.49 sq mi)
- Elevation: 389.2 m (1,277 ft)

Population (2002)
  - Total: 104
- Postal code: 1261

Češnjica (pronounced [ˈtʃeːʃnjitsa]; in older sources also Češnjice, German: Tscheschenze) is a settlement in central Slovenia. It lies in the hills east of the capital Ljubljana and belongs to the Ljubljana Urban Municipality. It is part of the traditional region of Lower Carniola and is now included with the rest of the municipality in the Central Slovenia Statistical Region.

== Name ==
The name Češnjica is shared with several other places in Slovenia. It is derived from the common noun češnja 'wild cherry', thus referring to the local vegetation. In the local dialect it is known as Češnjice. In the past the German name was Tscheschenze.
