= Brezje pri Lipoglavu =

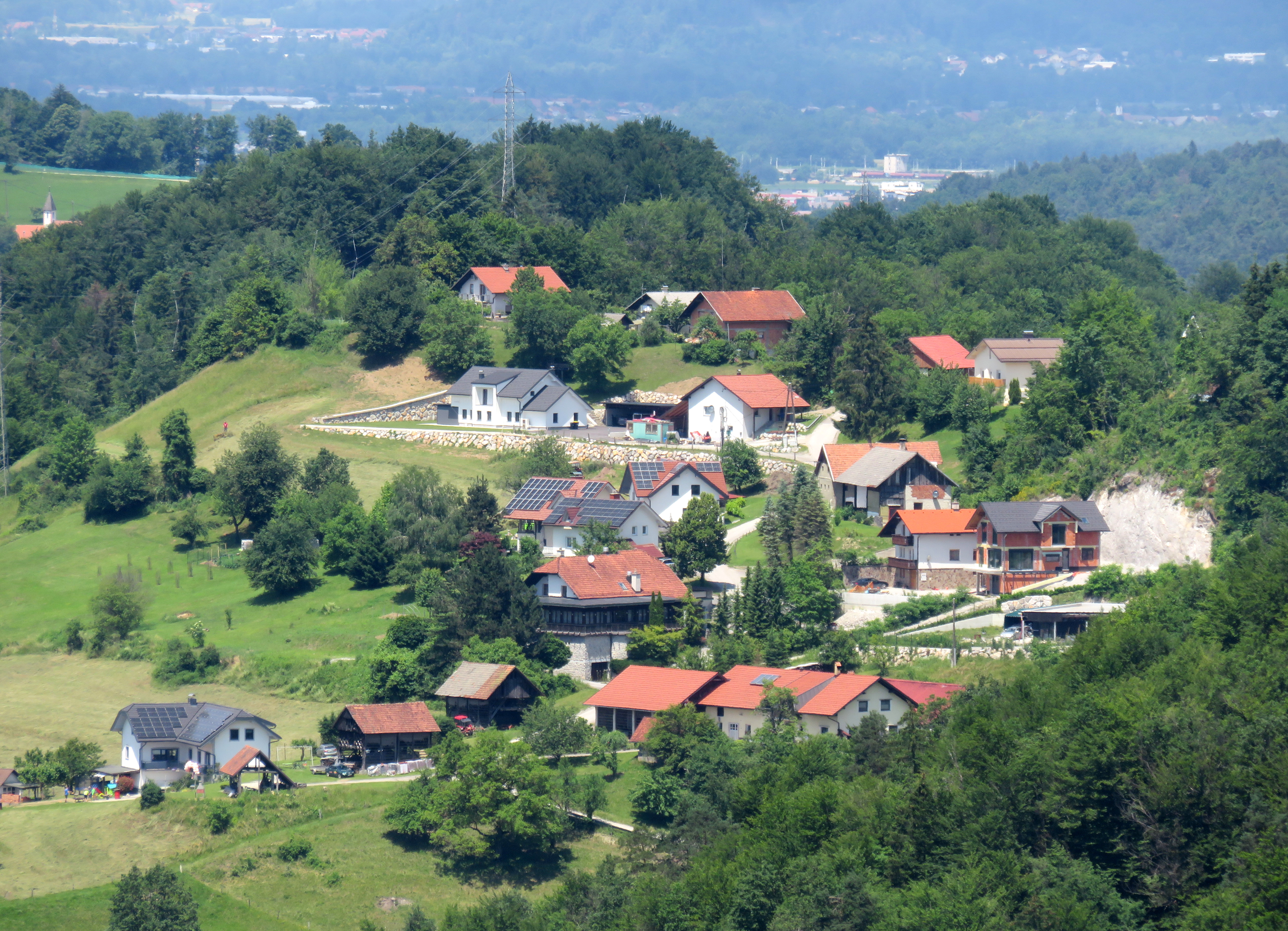

- Location in Slovenia
- Coordinates: 46°0′7.84″N 14°37′32.04″E
- Country: Slovenia
- Traditional region: Lower Carniola
- Statistical region: Central Slovenia
- Municipality: Ljubljana

Area
  - Total: 1.42 km^{2} (0.55 sq mi)
- Elevation: 420.2 m (1,379 ft)

Population (2002)
  - Total: 67
- Postal code: 1261

Brezje pri Lipoglavu (pronounced [ˈbɾeːzjɛ pɾi ˈliːpɔɡlaʋu]) is a small settlement in central Slovenia in the hills southeast of the capital Ljubljana. The settlement is part of the Ljubljana Urban Municipality. It lies in the traditional region of Lower Carniola and is now included with the rest of the municipality in the Central Slovenia Statistical Region.

== Name ==
Brezje pri Lipoglavu was attested in written sources as Piͤrkch in 1408 and Possenpirich in 1464, among other spellings. The name of the settlement was changed from Brezje to Brezje pri Lipoglavu in 1953.
