= Pance, Ljubljana =

Pance
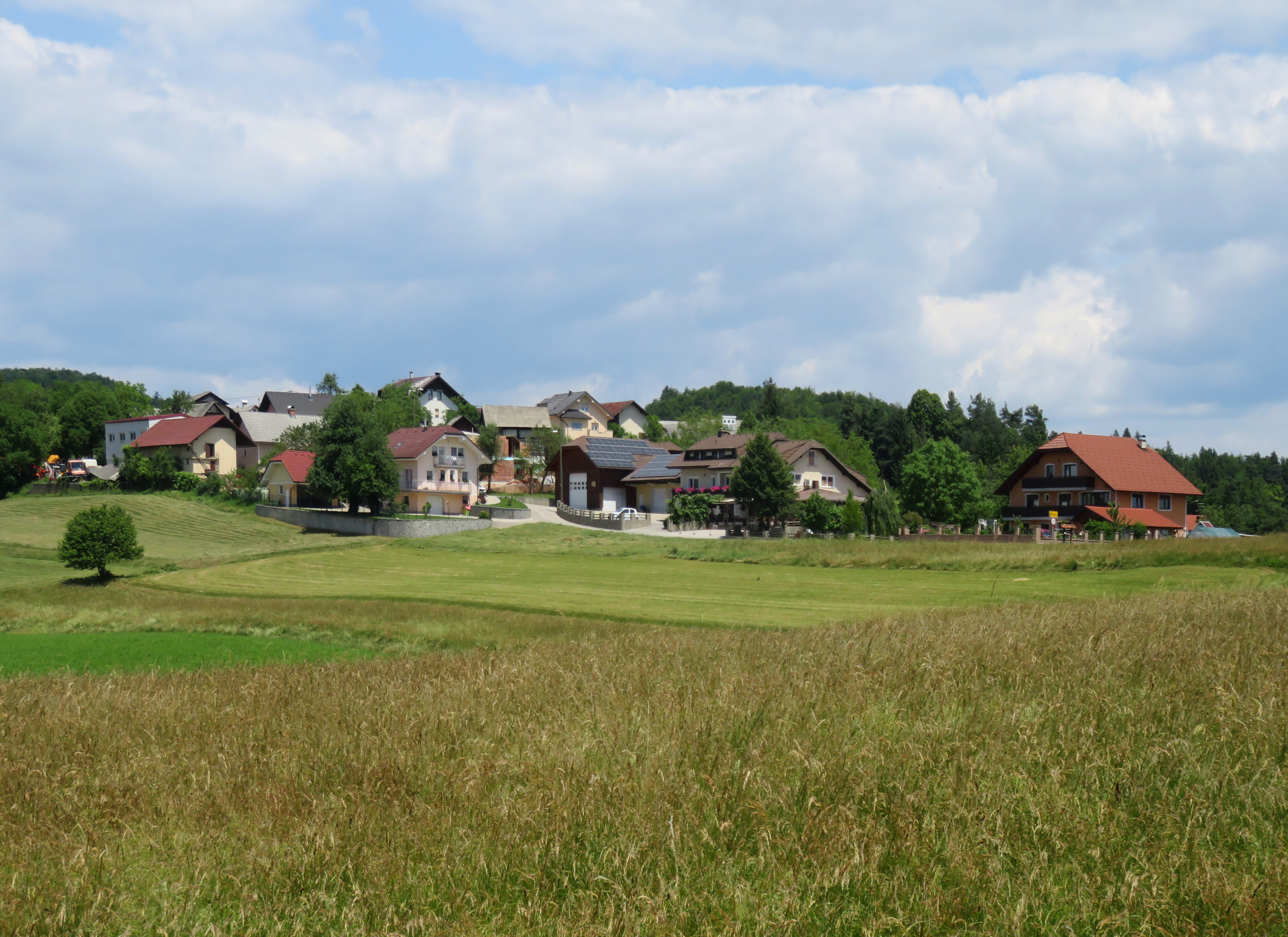
- Pance

- Location in Slovenia
- Coordinates: 45°59′35.25″N 14°39′58.19″E
- Country: Slovenia
- Traditional region: Lower Carniola
- Statistical region: Central Slovenia
- Municipality: Ljubljana

Area
  - Total: 1.58 km^{2} (0.61 sq mi)
- Elevation: 521.1 m (1,710 ft)

Population (2002)
  - Total: 73
- Postal code: 1293

Pance (pronounced [ˈpaːntsɛ]) is a settlement in the hills north of Grosuplje in central Slovenia. It belongs to the City Municipality of Ljubljana. The area is part of the traditional region of Lower Carniola. It is now included with the rest of the municipality in the Central Slovenia Statistical Region.

== Geography ==
Pance is located on a sun-exposed hill east of Mali Lipoglav above the Cirje Valley, where the Pance River (Slovene: Panška reka) flows north, fed by several small tributaries. The Dol Valley lies to the southeast. Fat Hill (Slovene: Debeli Hrib, elevation 617 meters or 2,024 feet) rises to the east. The soil is a mixture of sand and loam, and there are many rocks. There are tilled fields along the ridge of the hill.

== Name ==
Pance was attested in historical sources as Napancz in 1393, Panz in 1410, and Pantzdorff in 1496.

== History ==
The village is the site of a prehistoric settlement, finds from which are kept at the Natural History Museum in Vienna. A grave dating to the third century BC was discovered in a gravel pit in the village, and a Hallstatt burial site has been discovered.

=== Mass graves ===
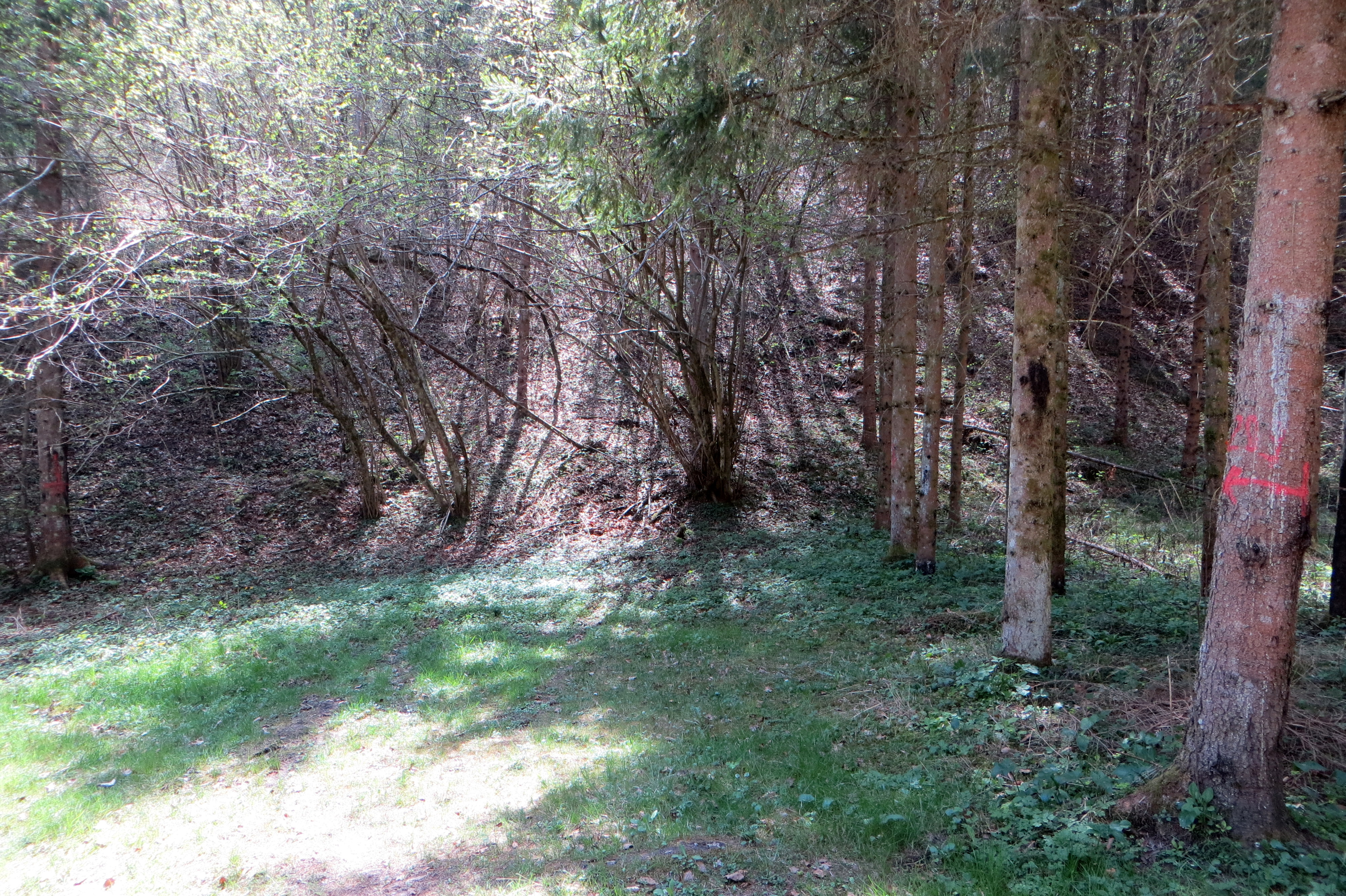
Cirje 2 Mass Grave

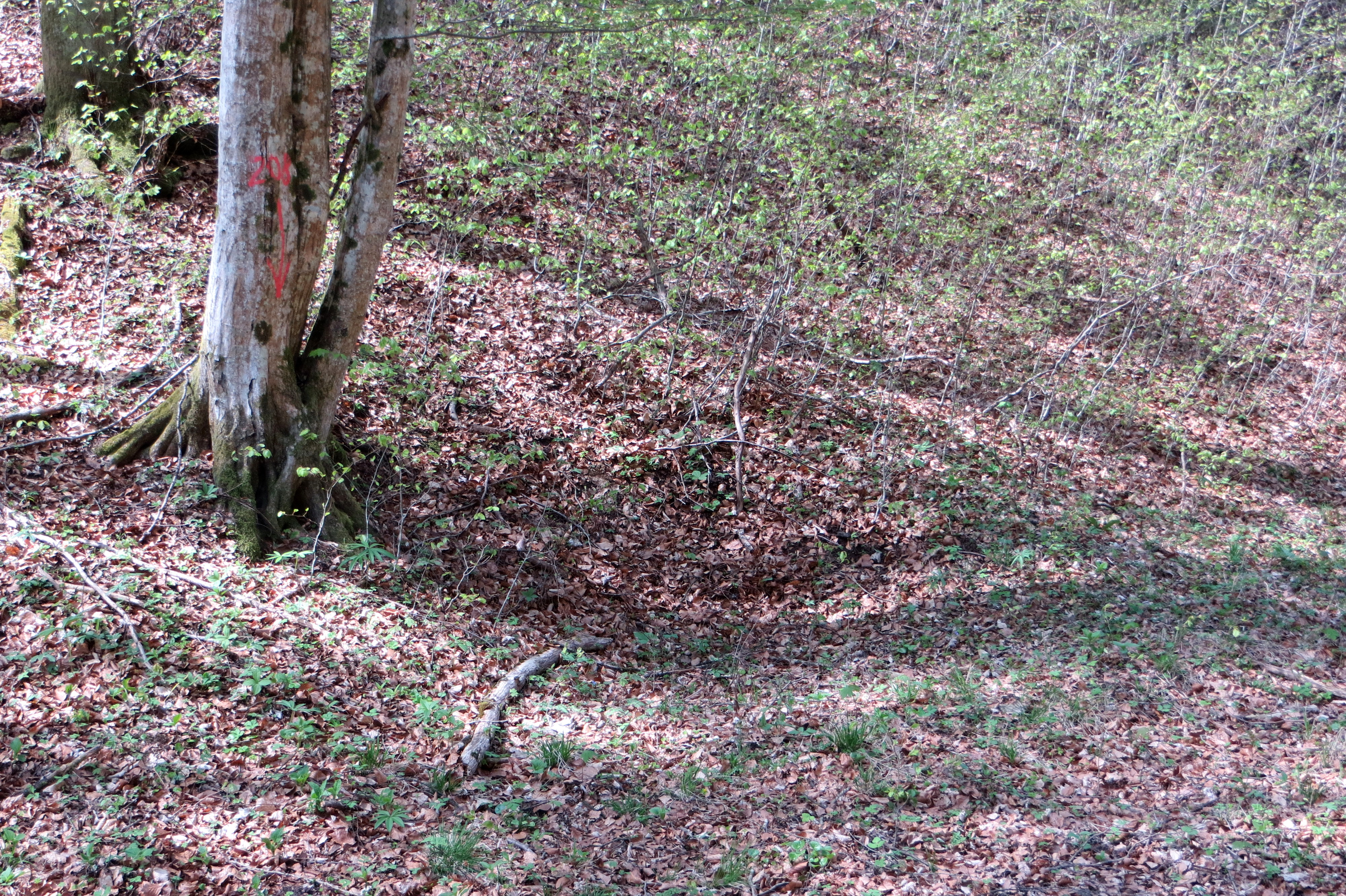
Cirje 5 Mass Grave

Mass graves in Pance

Pance is the site of four known mass graves associated with the Second World War. They are located in the woods northeast of the settlement and contain the remains of Slovene civilians that were accused of spying and were murdered by the Partisans in spring 1942. The Cirje 2 Mass Grave (Slovene: Grobišče Cirje 2) is also known as the Underhill Mass Grave (Grobišče Pod grmado). The Cirje 3 Mass Grave (Grobišče Cirje 3) is also known as the Ravne Mass Grave (Grobišče Ravne). The Cirje 4 Mass Grave (Grobišče Cirje 4) is also known as the Cirje Mass Grave (Grobišče Cirje). The Cirje 5 Mass Grave (Grobišče Cirje 5) is also known as the Big Ravine Mass Grave (Grobišče Velika Draga). The graves are marked with index numbers on trees.

== Cultural heritage ==
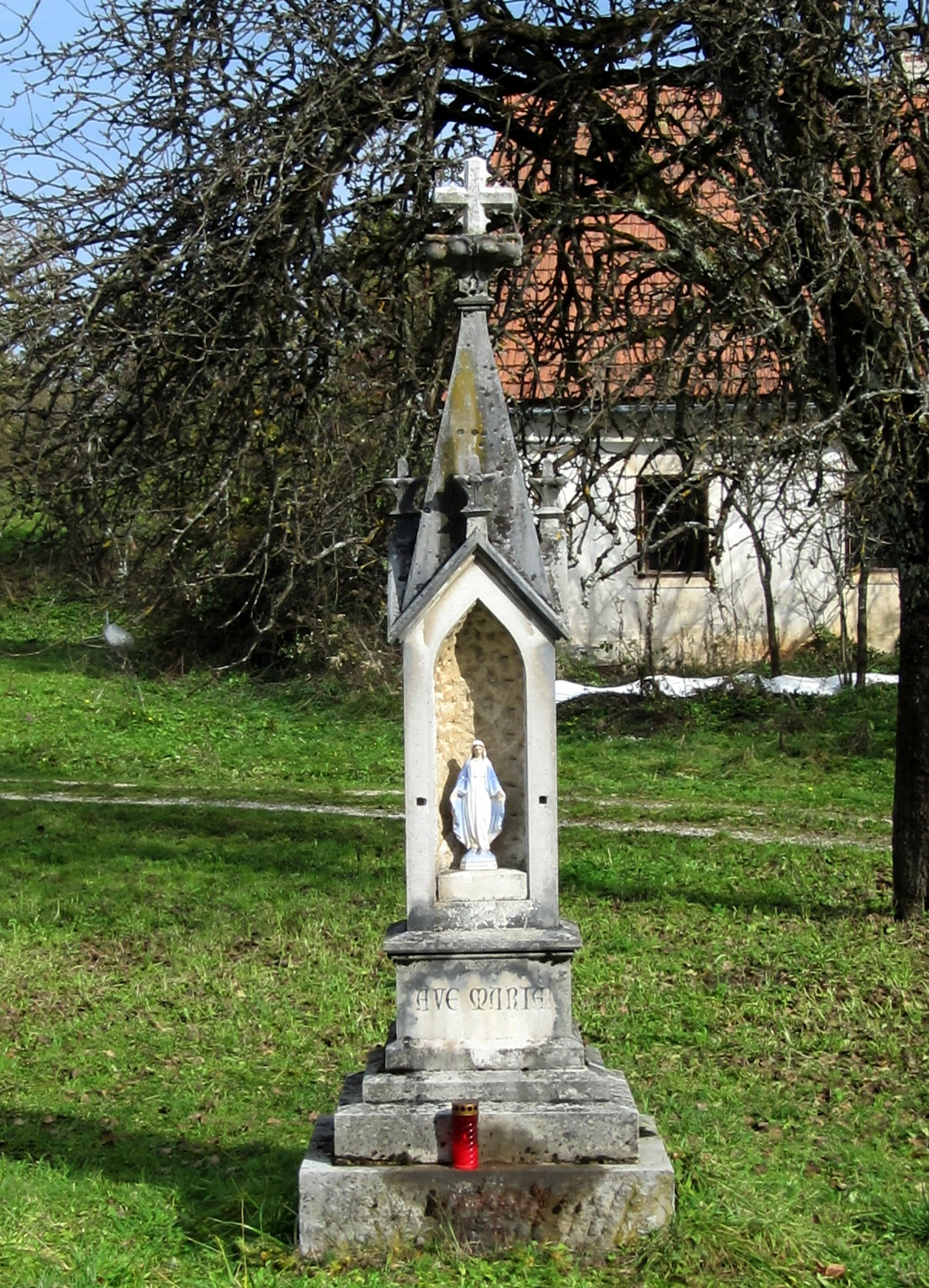
Wayside shrine

A wayside shrine dedicated to the Virgin Mary stands southwest of the village. It dates from 1903.

== Notable people ==
Notable people that were born or lived in Pance include:

- Anton Skubic (1876–1940), local historian
- Janez Žagar (1903–1972), writer and translator
