= Volavlje =

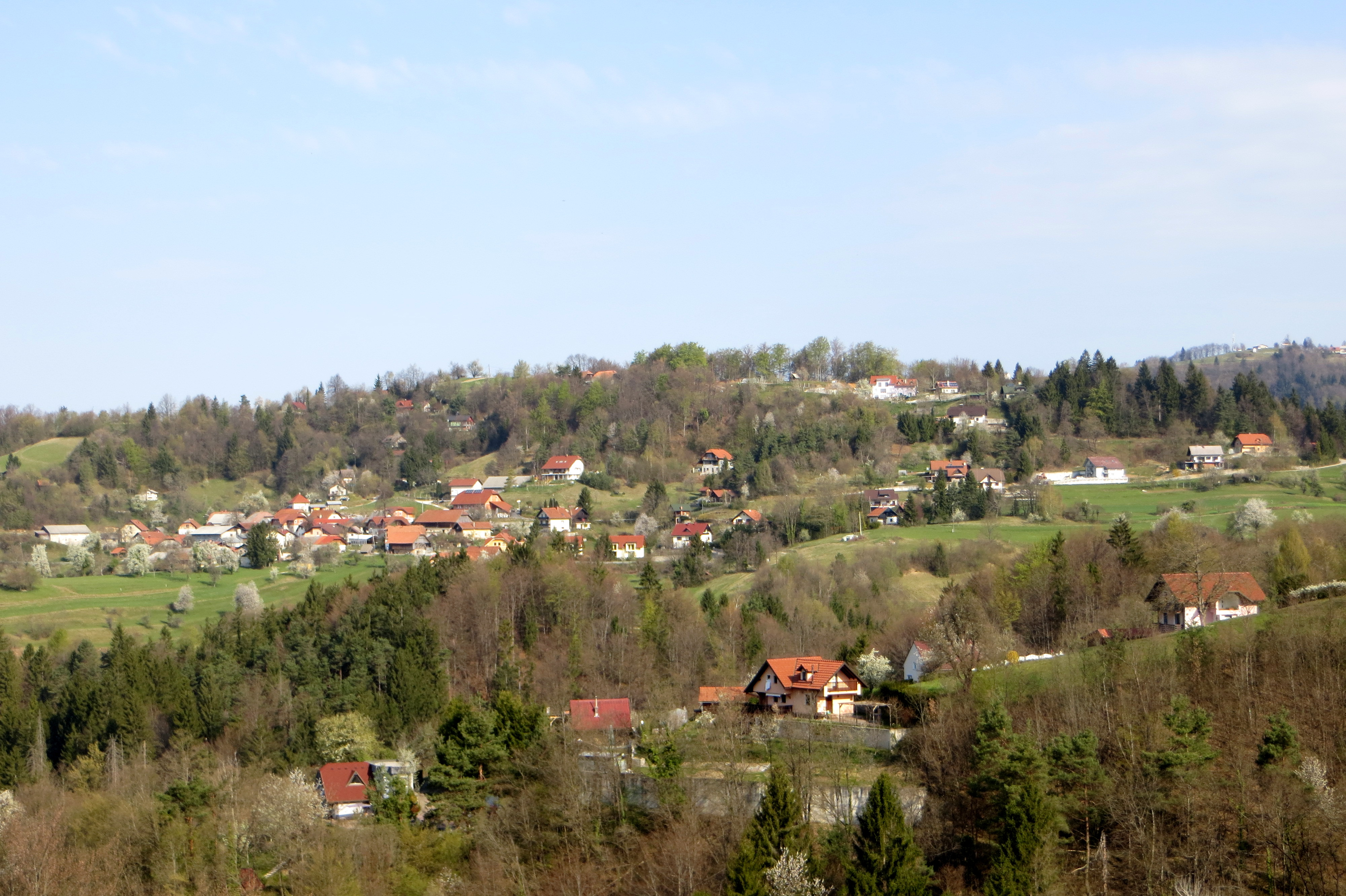

- Location in Slovenia
- Coordinates: 46°1′56.97″N 14°42′59.64″E
- Country: Slovenia
- Traditional region: Lower Carniola
- Statistical region: Central Slovenia
- Municipality: Ljubljana

Area
  - Total: 6.24 km^{2} (2.41 sq mi)
- Elevation: 593 m (1,946 ft)

Population (2002)
  - Total: 150
- Postal code: 1000

Volavlje (pronounced [ʋɔˈlaːu̯ljɛ]; German: Wolaule) is a settlement in the hills to the east of the Ljubljana in central Slovenia. It belongs to the City Municipality of Ljubljana. The area is part of the traditional region of Lower Carniola and is now included in the Central Slovenia Statistical Region.
