= Malo Trebeljevo =

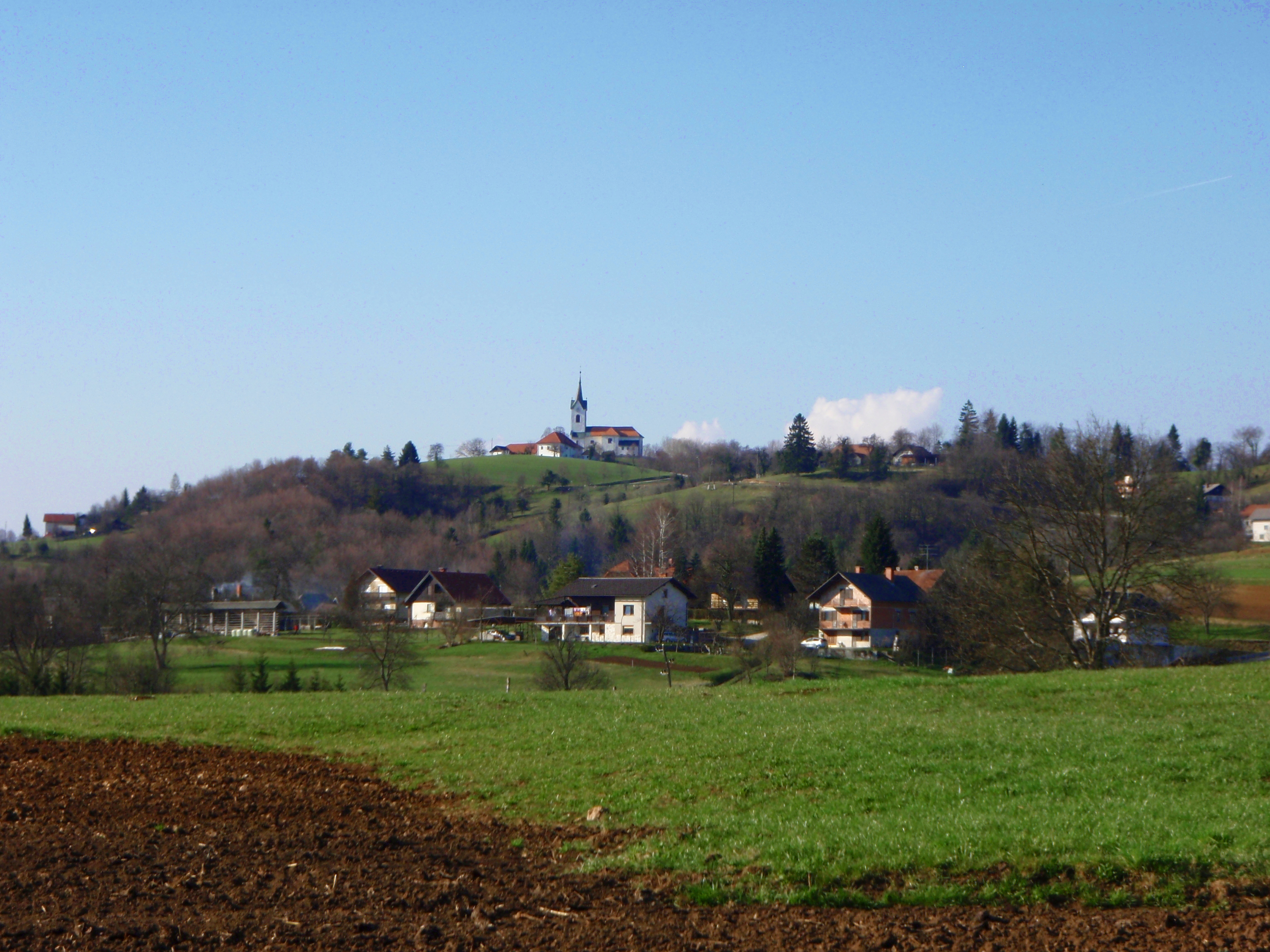

- Location in Slovenia
- Coordinates: 46°1′2.71″N 14°44′5.01″E
- Country: Slovenia
- Traditional region: Lower Carniola
- Statistical region: Central Slovenia
- Municipality: Ljubljana

Area
  - Total: 2.81 km^{2} (1.08 sq mi)
- Elevation: 567.3 m (1,861 ft)

Population (2002)
  - Total: 134
- Postal code: 1000

Malo Trebeljevo (pronounced [ˈmaːlɔ tɾɛbɛˈljeːʋɔ]; German: Kleintrebeleu) is a small settlement in the hills east of Ljubljana, the capital of Slovenia. It belongs to the City Municipality of Ljubljana. It is part of the traditional region of Lower Carniola and is now included with the rest of the municipality in the Central Slovenia Statistical Region.

South of the settlement, by Besnica Creek, a Roman-period burial ground has been discovered. It is likely associated with a nearby villa rustica.
