= Podmolnik =

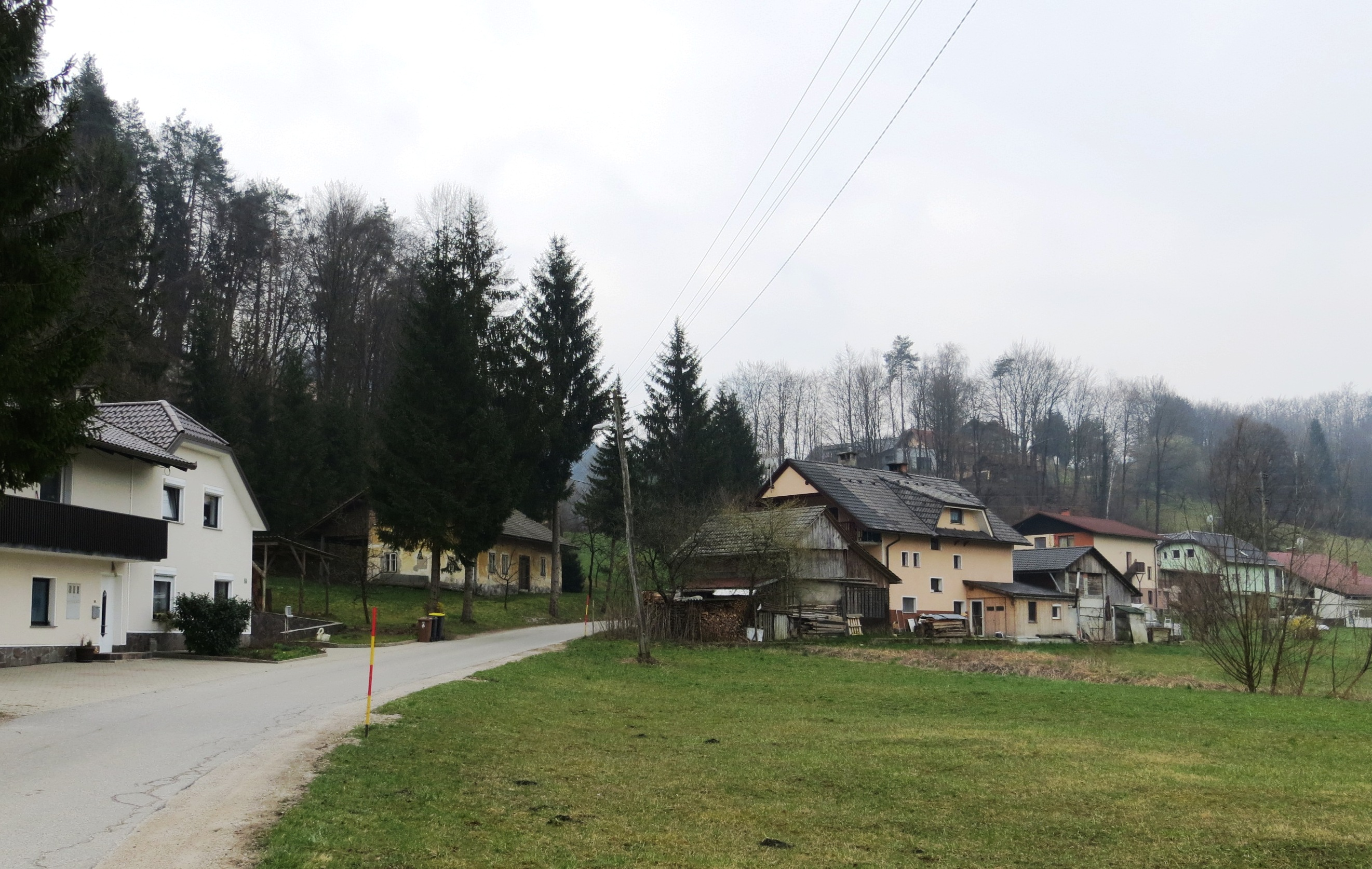

- Location in Slovenia
- Coordinates: 46°1′10.33″N 14°35′47.47″E
- Country: Slovenia
- Traditional region: Lower Carniola
- Statistical region: Central Slovenia
- Municipality: Ljubljana

Area
  - Total: 4.48 km^{2} (1.73 sq mi)
- Elevation: 314 m (1,030 ft)

Population (2002)
  - Total: 397
- Postal code: 1261

Podmolnik (pronounced [pɔdmɔu̯ˈniːk]) is a settlement in the City Municipality of Ljubljana in central Slovenia. It is part of the traditional region of Lower Carniola and is now included with the rest of the municipality in the Central Slovenia Statistical Region.

== Name ==
The name Podmolnik is a fused prepositional phrase that has lost case inflection, literally meaning 'below Molnik Hill' (< pod 'below' + Molnik). Molnik Hill, which stands south of the settlement, was attested in written sources in 1421 as Mellnik (and as Mellnikg in 1422 and Melnikh in 1490). The medieval forms of the name indicate that the hill was originally called *Melnik, which could be derived from the common noun mel 'scree'. A less likely theory derives the name from an Illyrian substatum word meaning 'mountain, hill'.

== Cultural heritage ==
Marenček Hill in the middle of the settlement has been identified as a site of an ancient hill fort with artefacts dating to the Iron Age and Roman period.
