= Medno =

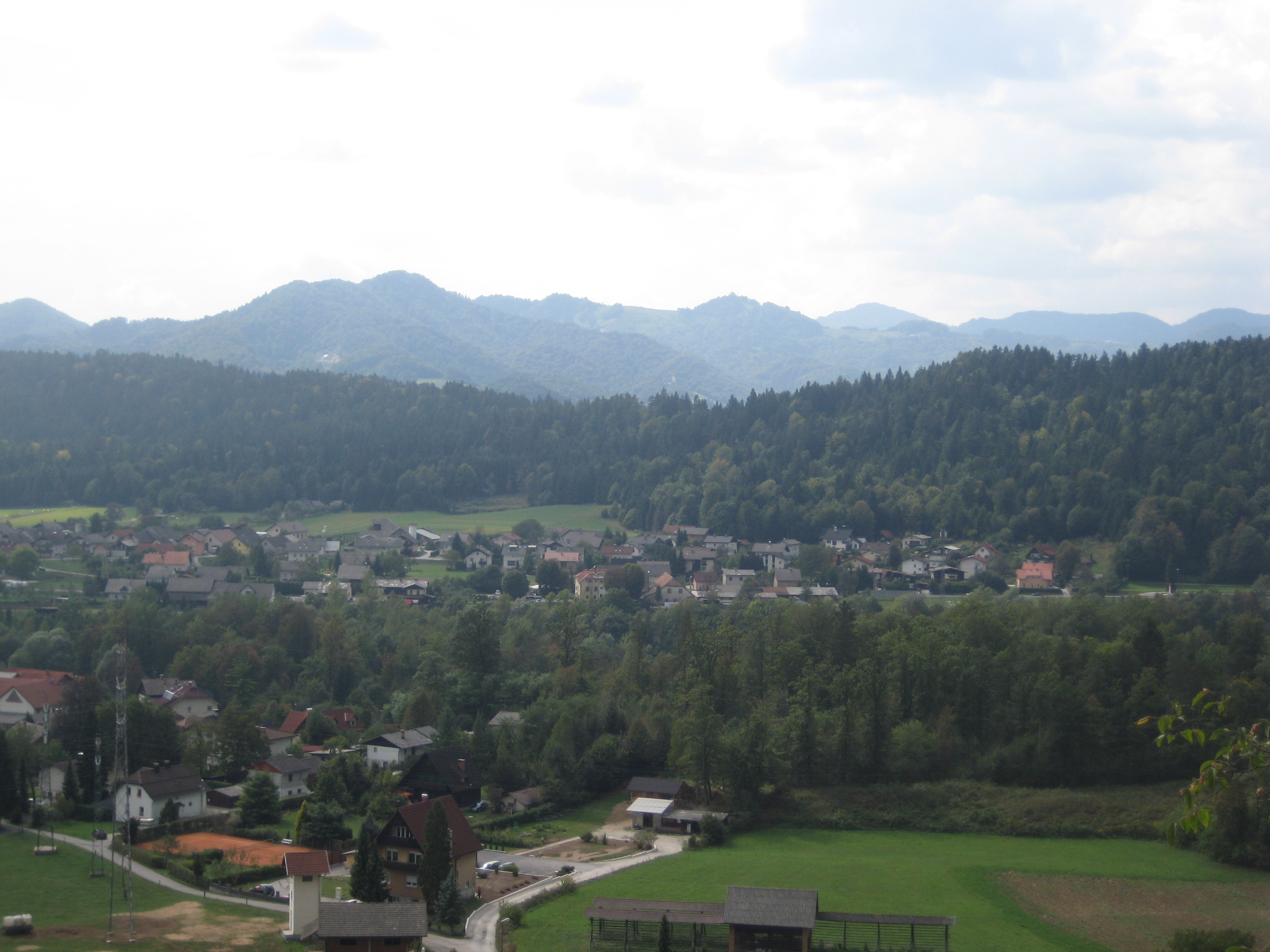

- Location in Slovenia
- Coordinates: 46°7′15.25″N 14°26′17.48″E
- Country: Slovenia
- Traditional region: Upper Carniola
- Statistical region: Central Slovenia
- Municipality: Ljubljana

Area
  - Total: 1.98 km^{2} (0.76 sq mi)
- Elevation: 314.8 m (1,033 ft)

Population (2002)
  - Total: 378
- Postal code: 1210

Medno (pronounced [ˈmɛːdnɔ]) is a settlement on the right bank of the Sava River in central Slovenia, northwest of the capital Ljubljana. It belongs to the City Municipality of Ljubljana. It is part of the traditional region of Upper Carniola and is now included with the rest of the municipality in the Central Slovenia Statistical Region.

In the area known as Na ježah, a Roman period burial ground has been discovered.
