= Dolgo Brdo, Ljubljana =

Dolgo Brdo
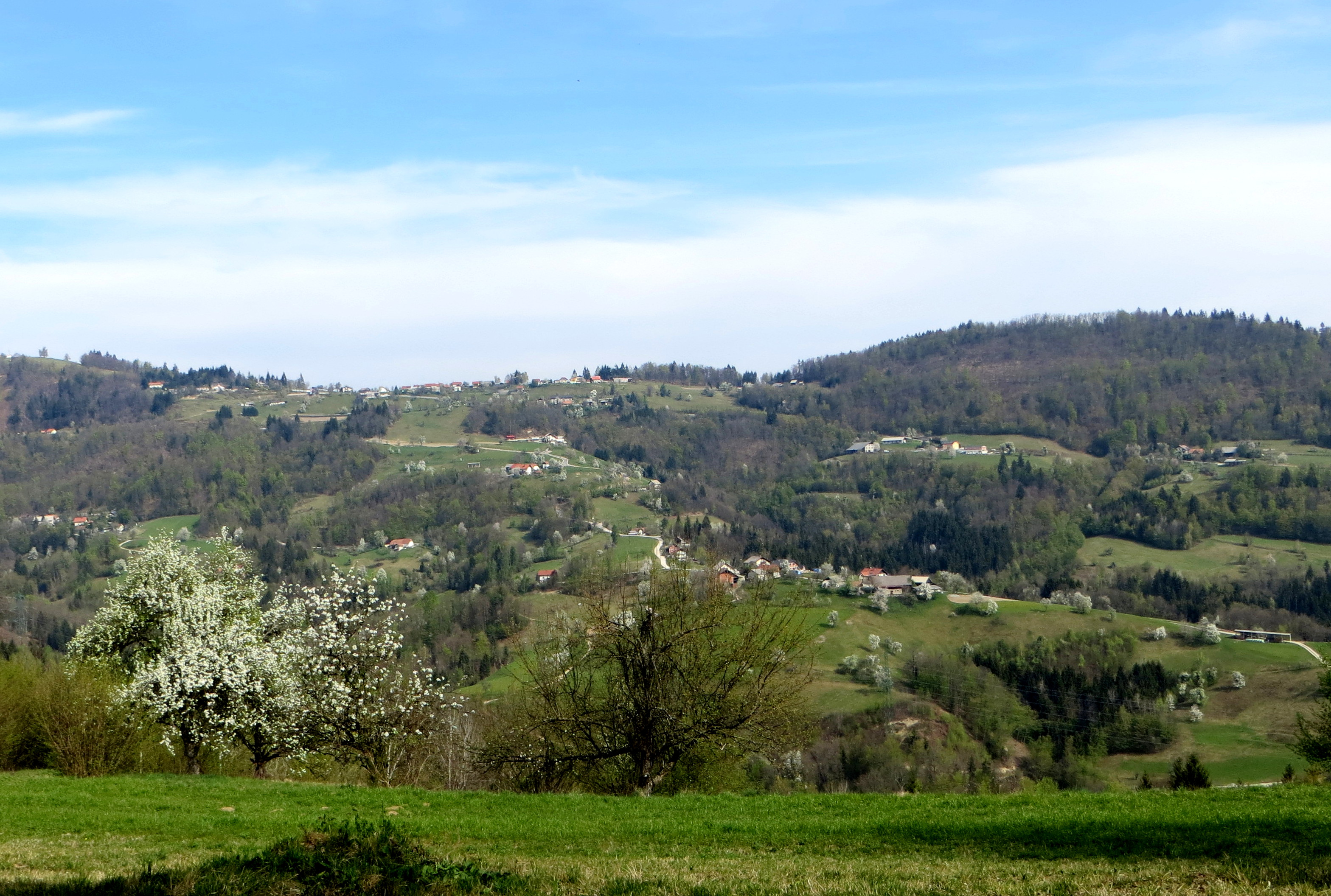

- Location in Slovenia
- Coordinates: 46°2′50.82″N 14°43′31.93″E
- Country: Slovenia
- Traditional region: Lower Carniola
- Statistical region: Central Slovenia
- Municipality: Ljubljana

Area
  - Total: 1.16 km^{2} (0.45 sq mi)
- Elevation: 545.1 m (1,788 ft)

Population (2002)
  - Total: 58
- Postal code: 1260

Dolgo Brdo (pronounced [ˈdoːu̯ɡɔ ˈbəɾdɔ]) is a small settlement in the hills east of Ljubljana in central Slovenia. It is included in the Ljubljana Urban Municipality. It lies in the traditional region of Lower Carniola and is now part of the Central Slovenia Statistical Region.

A small chapel in the settlement dates to the early 20th century.
