= Mali Vrh pri Prežganju =

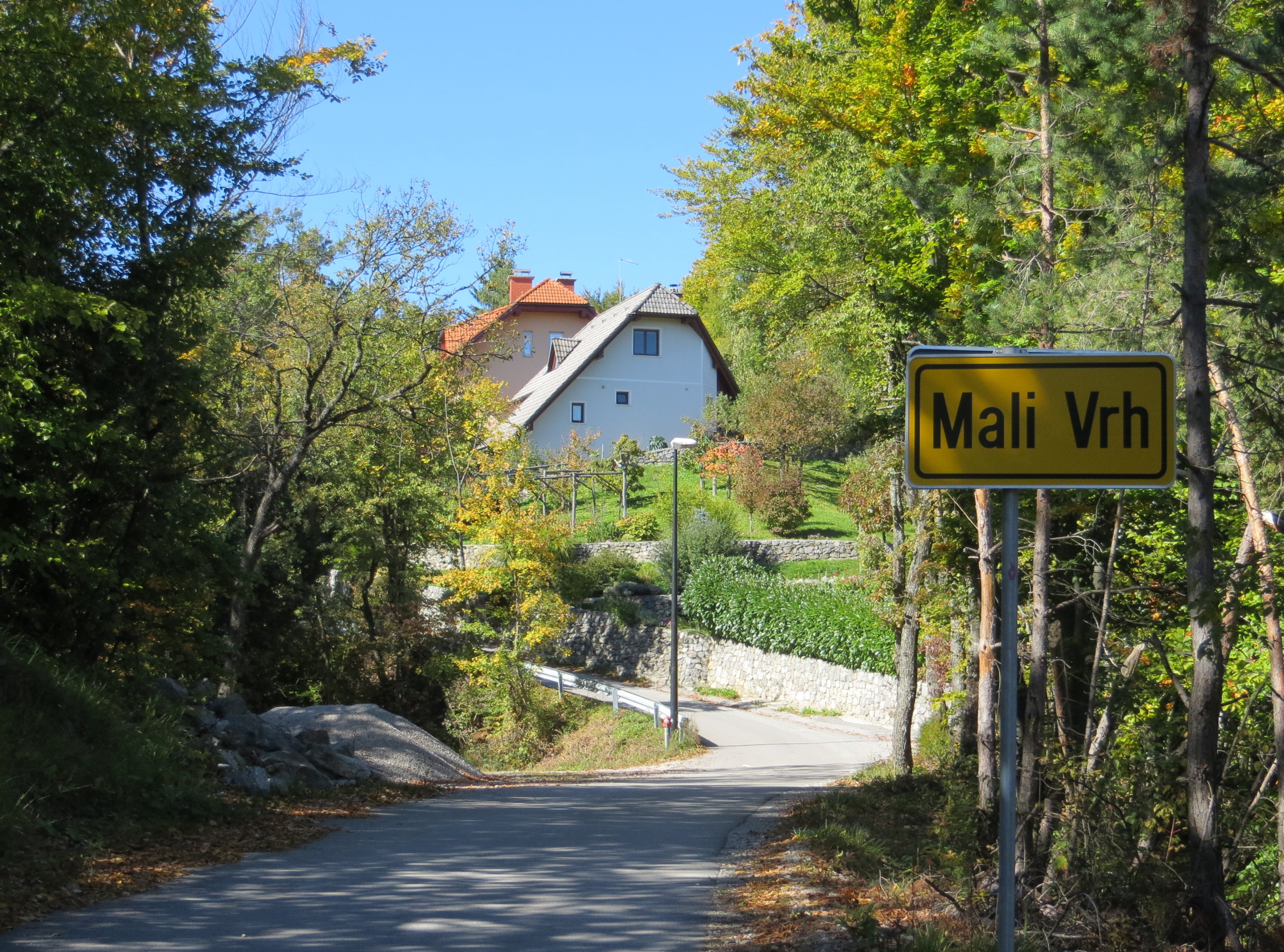

- Location in Slovenia
- Coordinates: 46°0′17.67″N 14°44′0.57″E
- Country: Slovenia
- Traditional region: Lower Carniola
- Statistical region: Central Slovenia
- Municipality: Ljubljana

Area
  - Total: 2.49 km^{2} (0.96 sq mi)
- Elevation: 665.6 m (2,184 ft)

Population (2002)
  - Total: 51
- Postal code: 1000

Mali Vrh pri Prežganju (pronounced [ˈmaːli ˈʋəɾx pɾi pɾɛˈʒɡaːnju]) is a small settlement in the hills east of Ljubljana, the capital of Slovenia. It belongs to the City Municipality of Ljubljana. The area is part of the traditional region of Lower Carniola and is now included with the rest of the municipality in the Central Slovenia Statistical Region.

== Name ==
The name of the settlement was changed from Mali Vrh to Mali Vrh pri Prežganju in 1955.
