= Vnajnarje =

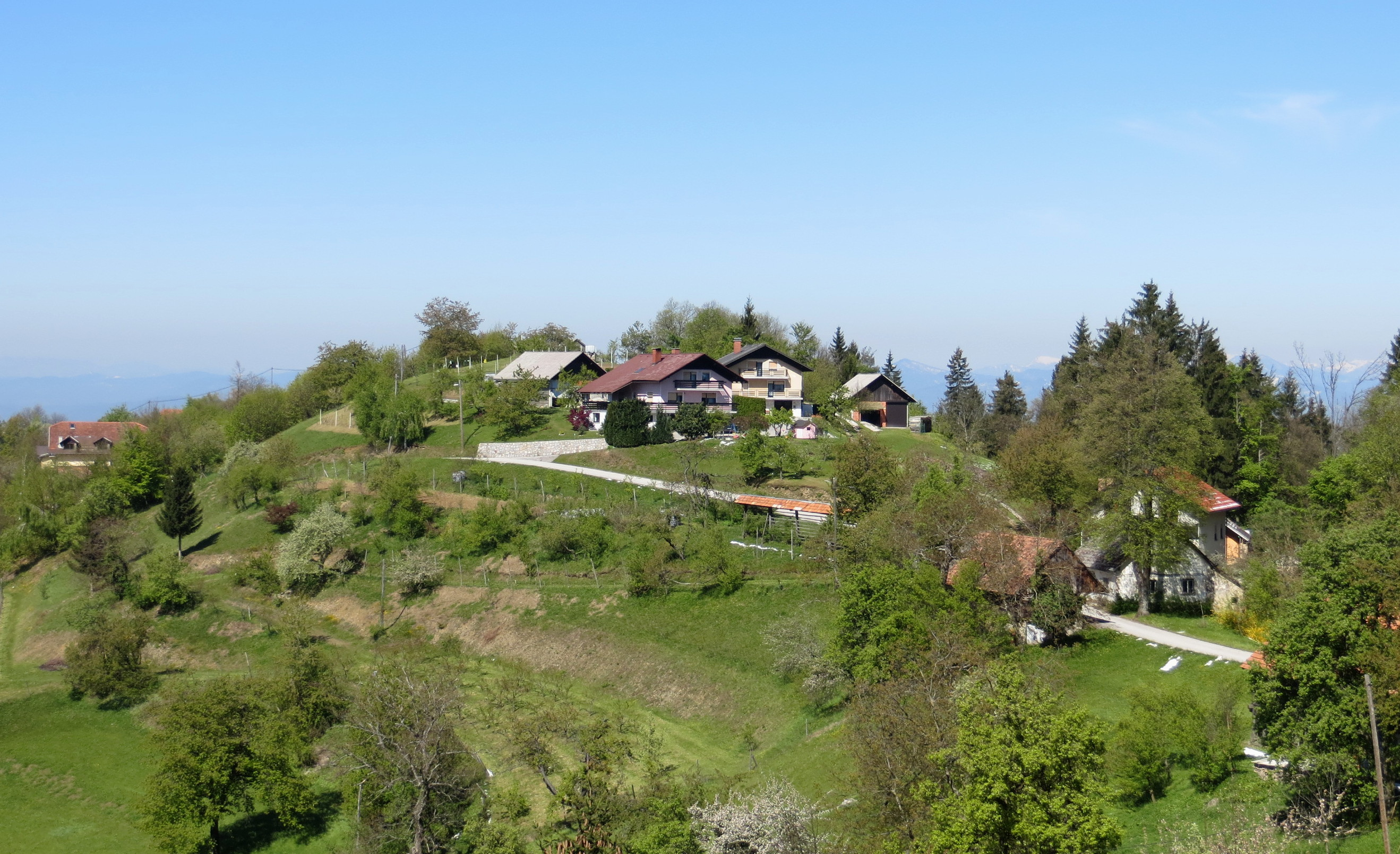

- Location in Slovenia
- Coordinates: 46°02′33″N 14°40′25″E
- Country: Slovenia
- Traditional region: Lower Carniola
- Statistical region: Central Slovenia
- Municipality: Ljubljana

Area
  - Total: 8.68 km^{2} (3.35 sq mi)
- Elevation: 655.6 m (2,151 ft)

Population (2002)
  - Total: 121
- Postal code: 1000

Vnajnarje (pronounced [ˈwnaːi̯naɾjɛ]; in older sources also Vnanjarje, German: Unainarje) is a settlement in the hills to the east of the capital Ljubljana in central Slovenia. It belongs to the City Municipality of Ljubljana. It is part of the traditional region of Lower Carniola and is now included with the rest of the municipality in the Central Slovenia Statistical Region.
