= Lipe, Ljubljana =

Lipe
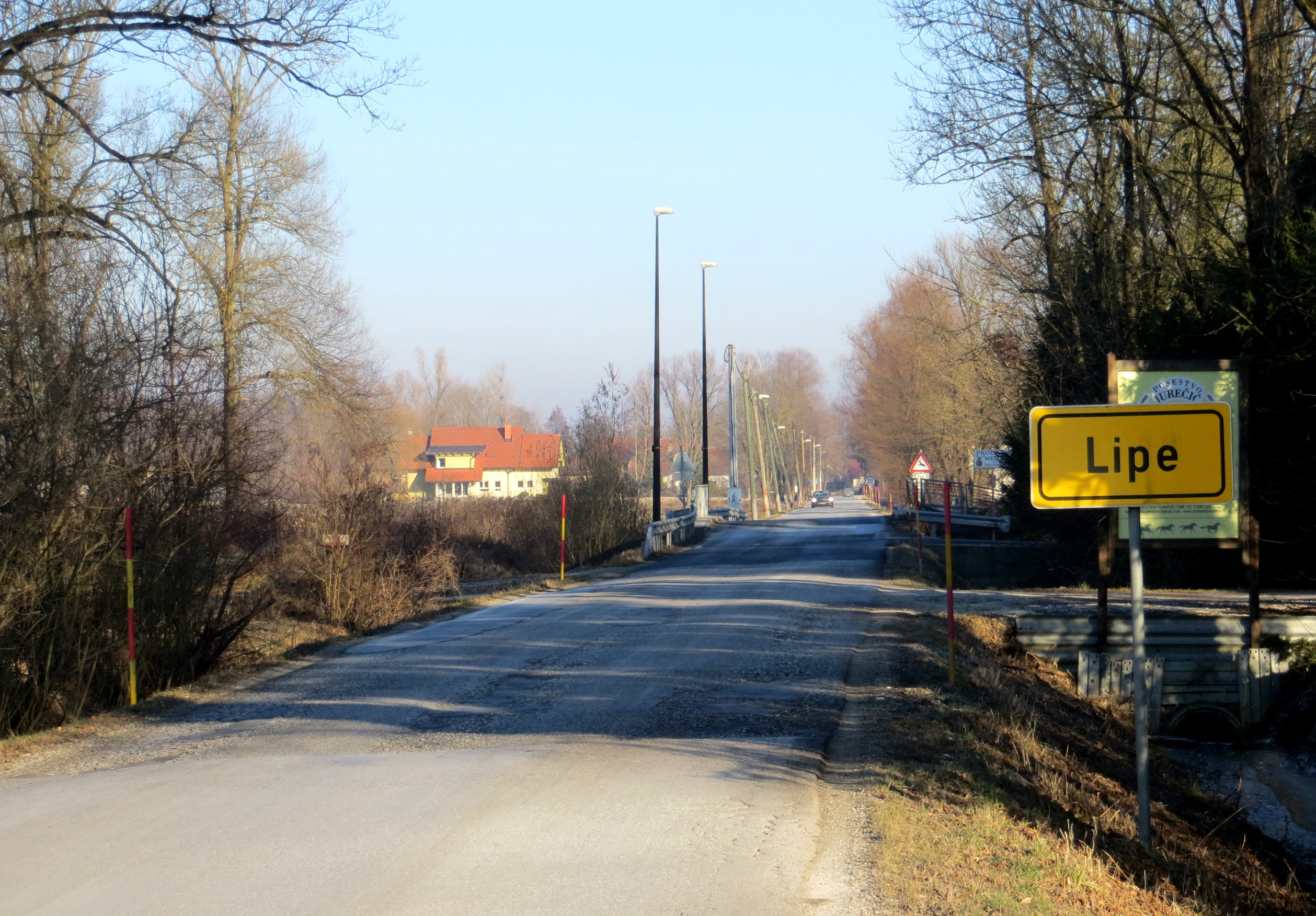

- Location in Slovenia
- Coordinates: 45°58′56.69″N 14°27′13.16″E
- Country: Slovenia
- Traditional region: Lower Carniola
- Statistical region: Central Slovenia
- Municipality: Ljubljana

Area
  - Total: 5.44 km^{2} (2.10 sq mi)
- Elevation: 288.2 m (946 ft)

Population (2002)
  - Total: 50
- Postal code: 1000

Lipe (pronounced [ˈliːpɛ]) is a settlement in the marshland south of Ljubljana in central Slovenia. It belongs to the City Municipality of Ljubljana. The area is part of the traditional Lower Carniola region. It is now included with the rest of the municipality in the Central Slovenia Statistical Region.
