= Dvor, Ljubljana =

Dvor
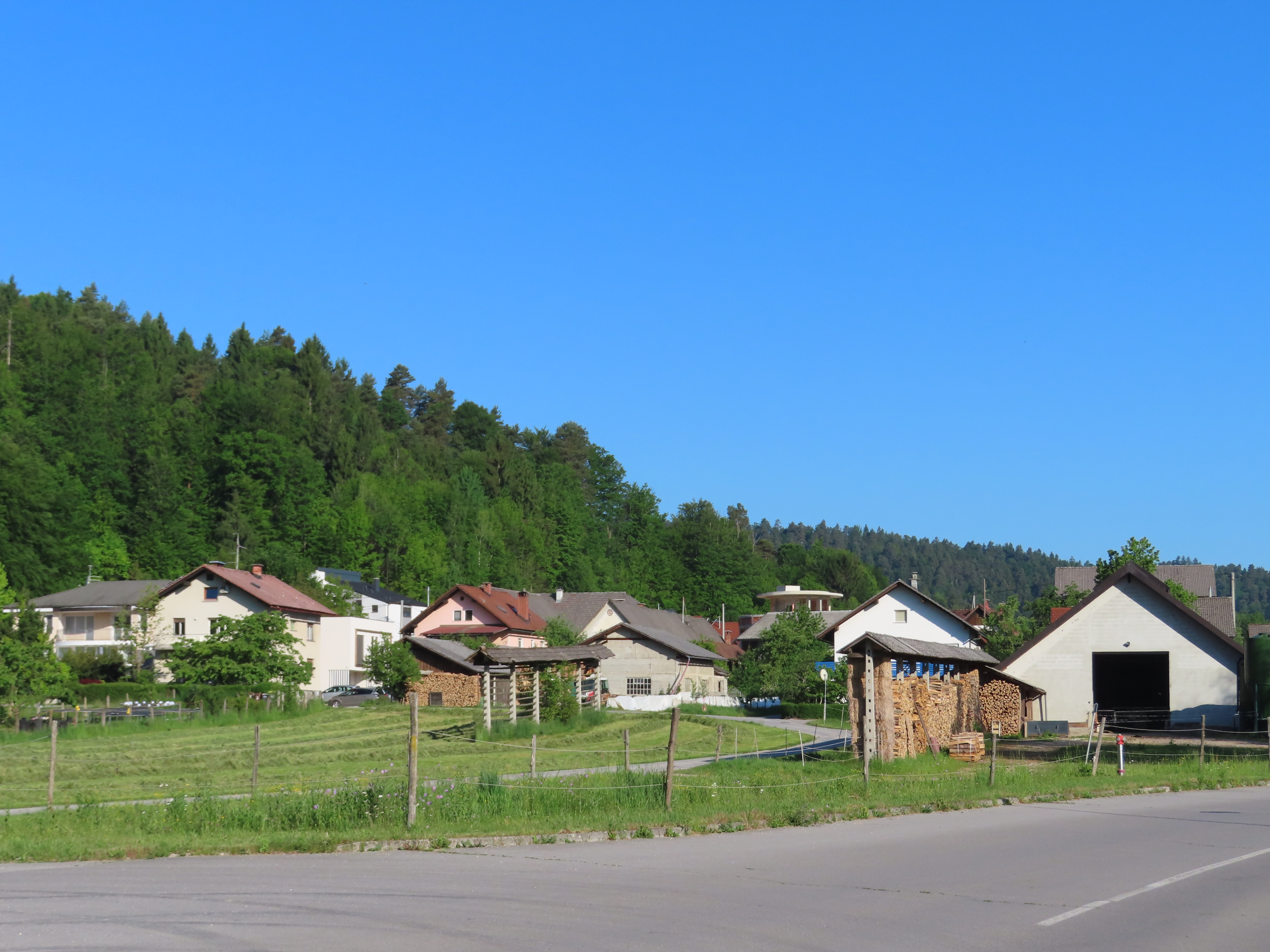

- Location in Slovenia
- Coordinates: 46°6′14.41″N 14°26′28.34″E
- Country: Slovenia
- Traditional region: Upper Carniola
- Statistical region: Central Slovenia
- Municipality: Ljubljana

Area
  - Total: 0.73 km^{2} (0.28 sq mi)
- Elevation: 331.6 m (1,088 ft)

Population (2002)
  - Total: 122
- Postal code: 1210

Dvor (pronounced [ˈdʋɔɾ]) is a settlement in central Slovenia, immediately northwest of the capital Ljubljana. It belongs to the Ljubljana Urban Municipality. Part of the traditional region of Upper Carniola, it is now included with the rest of the municipality in the Central Slovenia Statistical Region.

Earthworks that were part of a prehistoric Early Iron Age settlement were identified near the settlement in 2006.
