= Zagradišče =

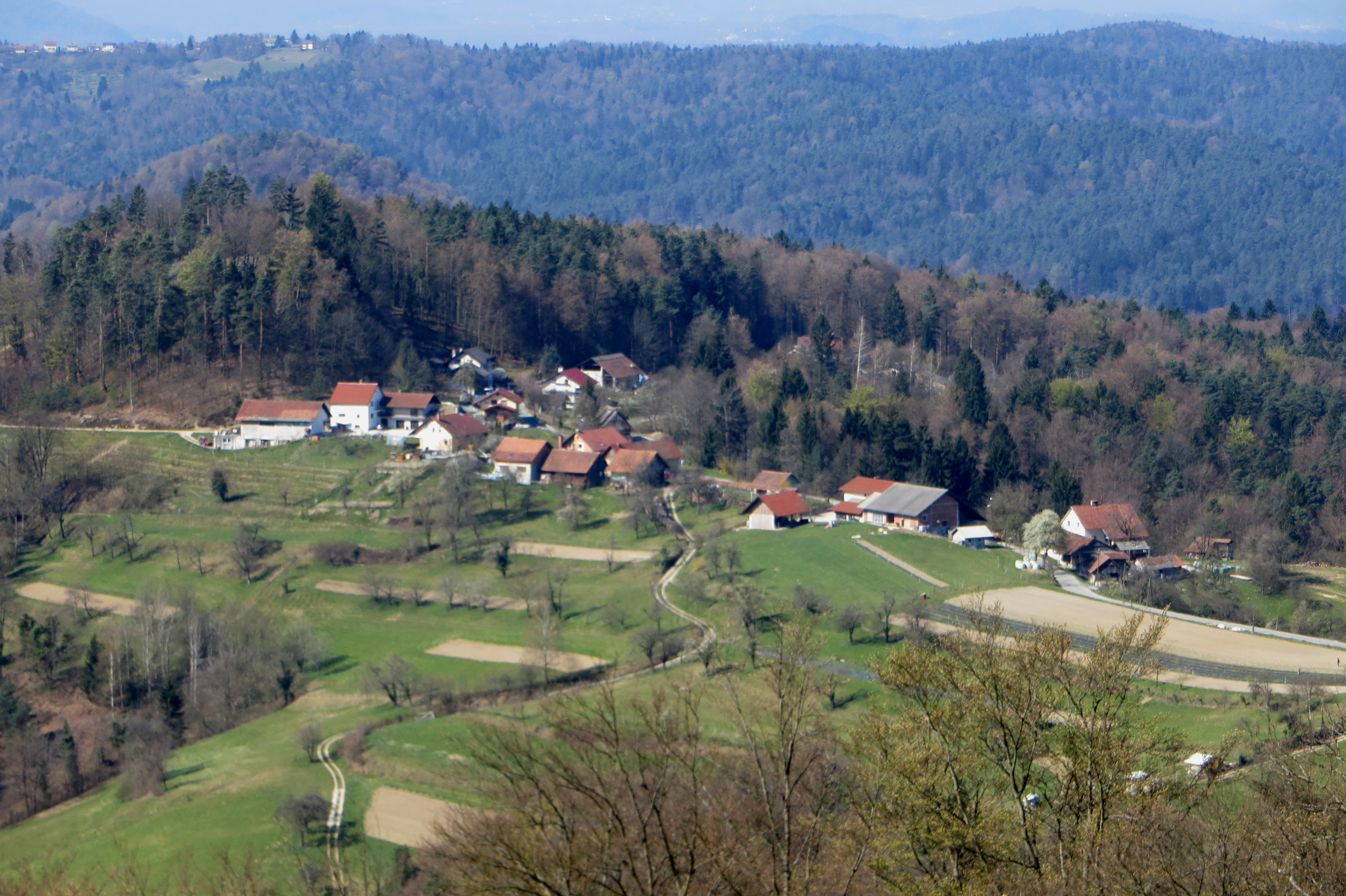

- Location in Slovenia
- Coordinates: 46°1′48.61″N 14°37′42.06″E
- Country: Slovenia
- Traditional region: Lower Carniola
- Statistical region: Central Slovenia
- Municipality: Ljubljana

Area
  - Total: 4.18 km^{2} (1.61 sq mi)

Population (2019)
  - Total: 82
  - Density: 20/km^{2} (51/sq mi)
- Postal code: 1261

Zagradišče (pronounced [zaɡɾaˈdiːʃtʃɛ]) is a settlement in the hills east of Ljubljana, the capital of Slovenia. It is included in the City Municipality of Ljubljana. It is part of the traditional region of Lower Carniola and is now part of the Central Slovenia Statistical Region.
