= Prežganje =

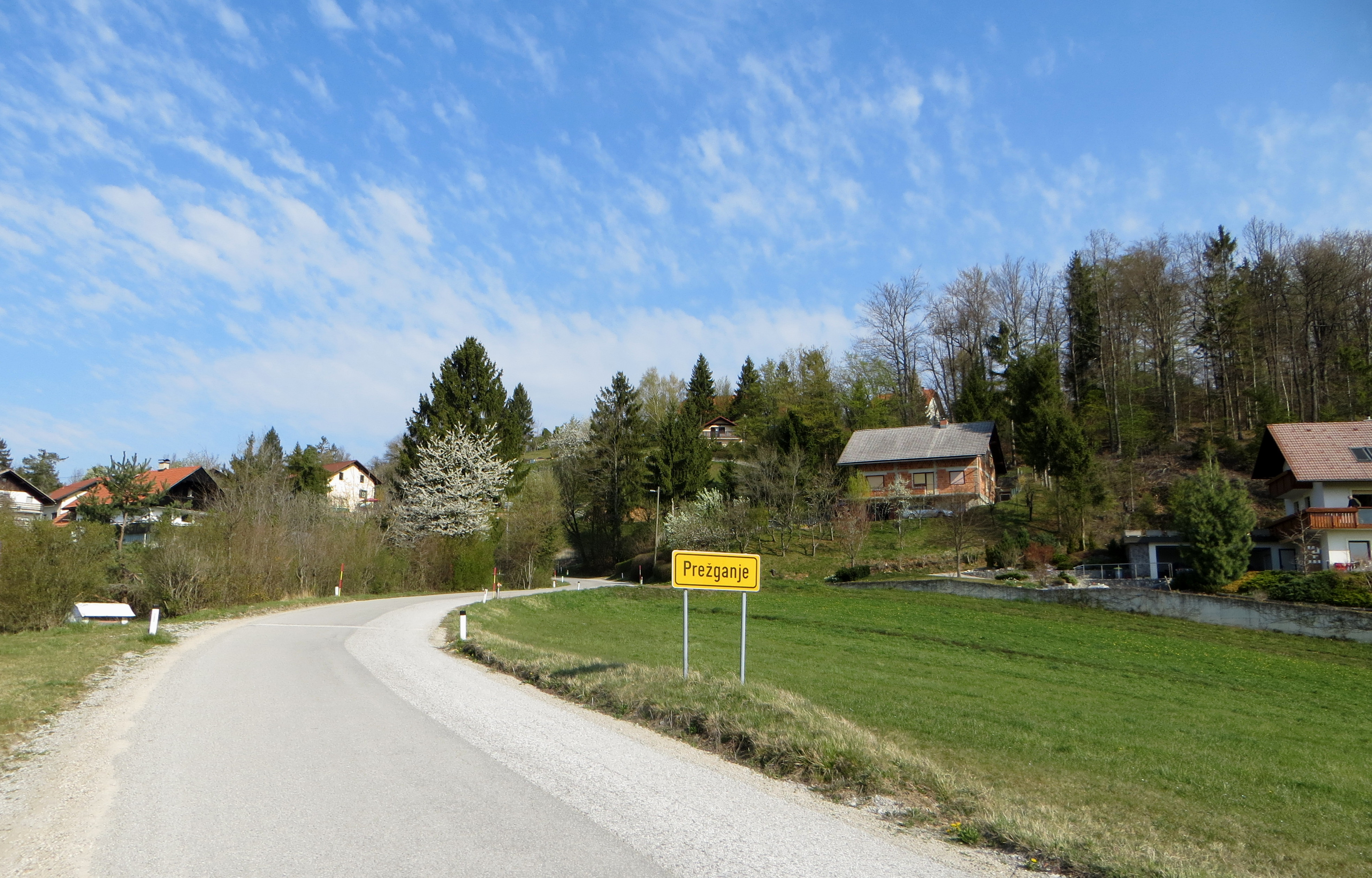

- Location in Slovenia
- Coordinates: 46°1′22.71″N 14°43′31.9″E
- Country: Slovenia
- Traditional region: Lower Carniola
- Statistical region: Central Slovenia
- Municipality: Ljubljana

Area
  - Total: 1.73 km^{2} (0.67 sq mi)
- Elevation: 590.4 m (1,937 ft)

Population (2002)
  - Total: 120
- Postal code: 1000

Prežganje (pronounced [pɾɛˈʒɡaːnjɛ]) is a settlement in the hills east of Ljubljana in Slovenia. It belongs to the City Municipality of Ljubljana. It is part of the traditional region of Lower Carniola and is now included with the rest of the municipality in the Central Slovenia Statistical Region.

The local parish church is dedicated to Saint Margaret and belongs to the Roman Catholic Archdiocese of Ljubljana. It is a Baroque church built in 1777.
