= Ljubljansko Posavje =

Ljubljansko Posavje (Ljubljana Sava valley) is the common name for villages along the Sava River and near the city of Ljubljana. The name of the village indicates Kleče, Savlje, Ježica, Mala vas, Črnuče, Stožice, Tomačevo and Jarše. The name was previously used quite frequently, until the village maintained its identity. After the Second World War, the village began to melt with the city and name has been maintained mainly in the appointment of the Posavje District, which includes Stožice, Kleče, Savlje, Mala vas, Ježica and residential blocks BS 7.
