= Jarše =

Jarše may refer to the following settlements in Slovenia:

- Jarše District, a district of the City of Ljubljana
- Jarše, Ljubljana, a former settlement in the City Municipality of Ljubljana
- Jarše, Zagorje ob Savi, a settlement in the Municipality of Zagorje ob Savi
- Nove Jarše, a neighborhood in the City Municipality of Ljubljana
- Spodnje Jarše, Domžale, a settlement in the Municipality of Domžale
- Spodnje Jarše, Ljubljana, a former settlement in the City Municipality of Ljubljana
- Srednje Jarše, a settlement in the Municipality of Domžale
- Stare Jarše, a former settlement in the City Municipality of Ljubljana
- Zgornje Jarše, Domžale, a settlement in the Municipality of Domžale
- Zgornje Jarše, Ljubljana, a former settlement in the City Municipality of Ljubljana
