= Posavje District, Ljubljana =

Settlement in Slovenia

Coordinates: 46°05′43″N 14°30′24″E

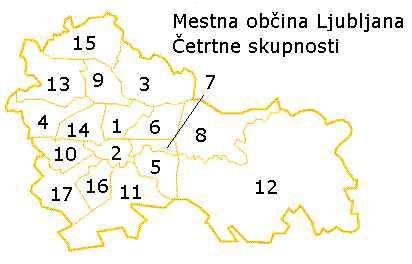
Map of districts in Ljubljana. The Posavje District is number 9.

The Posavje District (Slovene: Četrtna skupnost Posavje; literally, 'Sava Valley District'), or simply Posavje, is a district (mestna četrt) of the City Municipality of Ljubljana, the capital of Slovenia.

== Geography ==
The Posavje District is bounded on the west by a line through farmland east of the A2 Freeway, on the north by the Sava River, on the east by Stryia Street (Štajerska cesta), and on the south by the H3 Expressway (i.e., the northern section of the Ljubljana Loop). The district includes the former settlements of Ježica, Kleče, Mala Vas na Posavju, Savlje, and Stožice.
