= Slovene quintain =

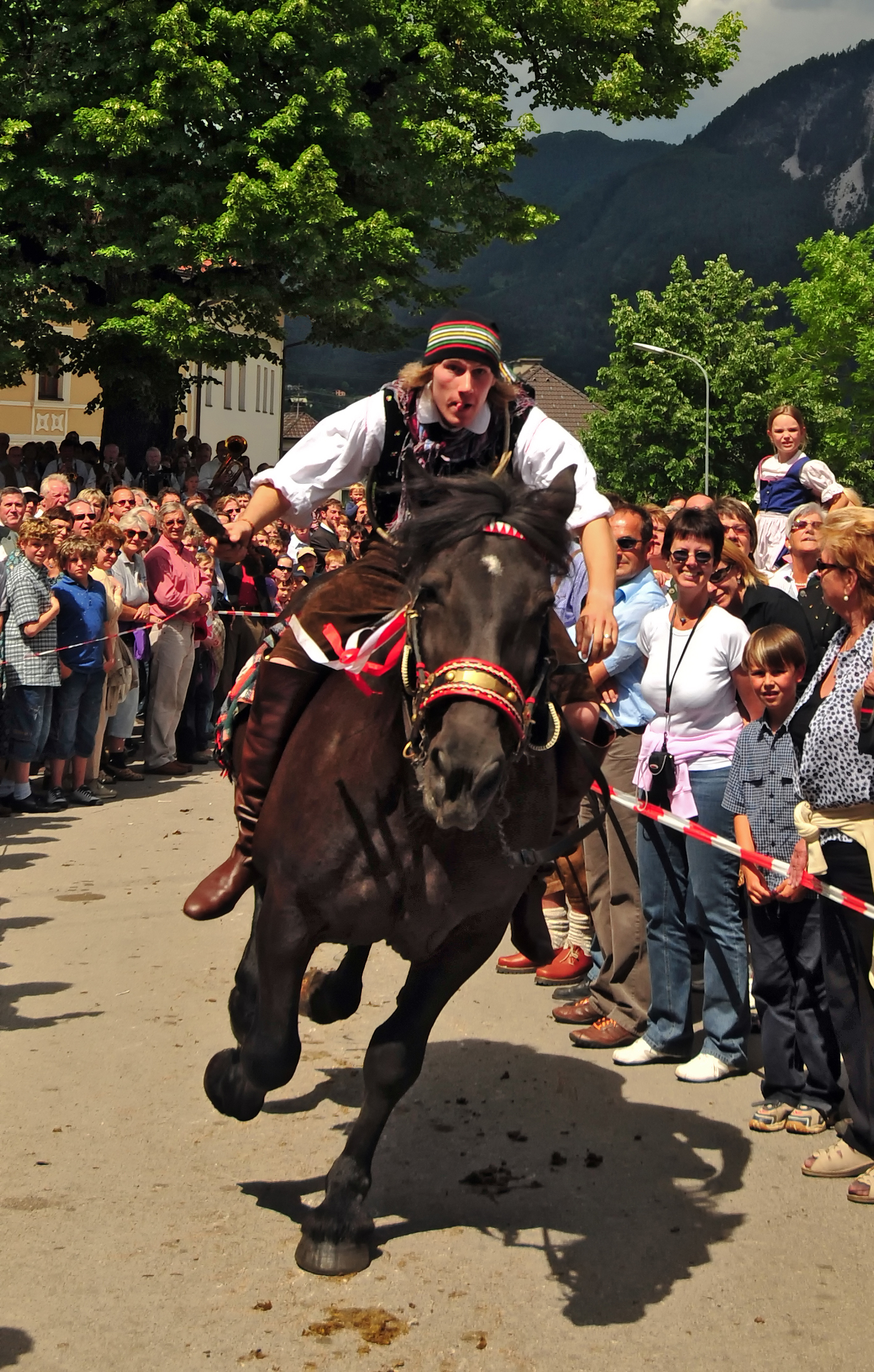
Quintain rider on a bareback Noriker horse in Feistritz an der Gail

Slovene quintain (Slovene: štehvanje, German: Kufenstechen) is a traditional Slovene mounted folk game, a form of jousting, that has been preserved in the southern Austrian state of Carinthia. It is held during Kirchweih festivals in the lower Gail Valley, where it has become a major tourist attraction. The štehvanje competition has also taken place every year in Savlje, Ljubljana and sometimes in neighboring villages since the 1930s.

== History ==
It is commonly believed that štehvanje is the rustic form of a Roman knight's game called quintain. It originated in conjunction with medieval tournaments, local blessings and Pentecostal games. It may have come from the Upper Italian Friuli and Istria regions, where it was popular in the 18th century. Carters brought this game with them as they traveled from Trieste to Vienna, passing Udine and Tarvisio.

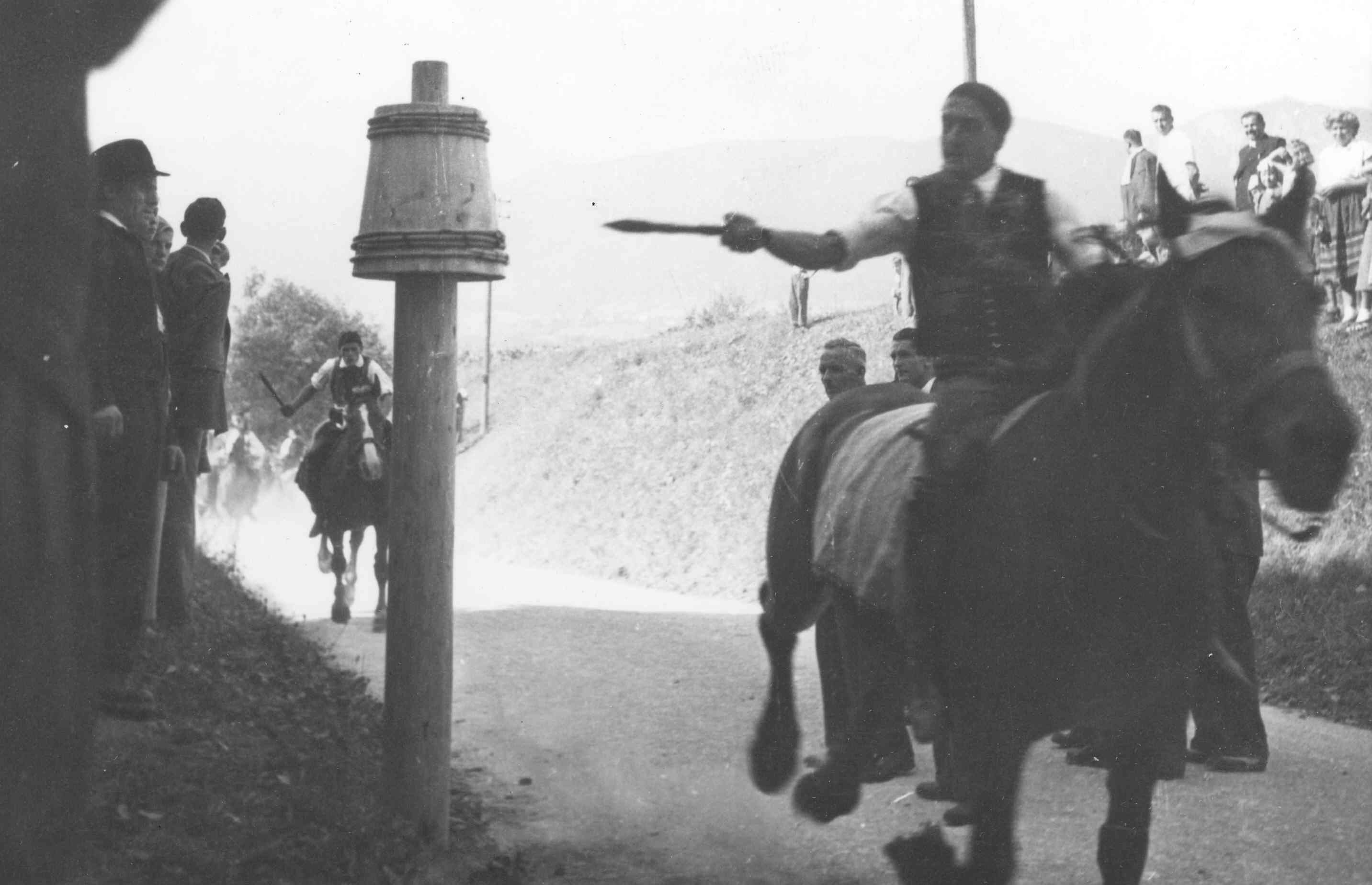
Slovene quintain in Achomitz (Zahomec), Gail Valley, 1951

The Slovene name derives from the German word stechen 'to stab', which indicates that in the beginning players stabbed a barrel with a long iron pole. However, because the pole was never sharp enough to stick into a wooden barrel, riders began to use an iron bat (količ).

In 1804 Archduke John of Austria mentioned a Kufenstechen tournament he had witnessed in Sankt Stefan im Gailtal. The game has been present in the villages of Ljubljansko Posavje (Ježica, Savlje, Kleče, Stožice and Mala Vas) since 1935, when ethnomusicologist France Marolt presented this custom at a folklore festival in Ljubljana. The exercises were held under the leadership of Janko Zwitter from Achomitz (Slovene: Zahomec) in the Gail Valley.

== Variations ==
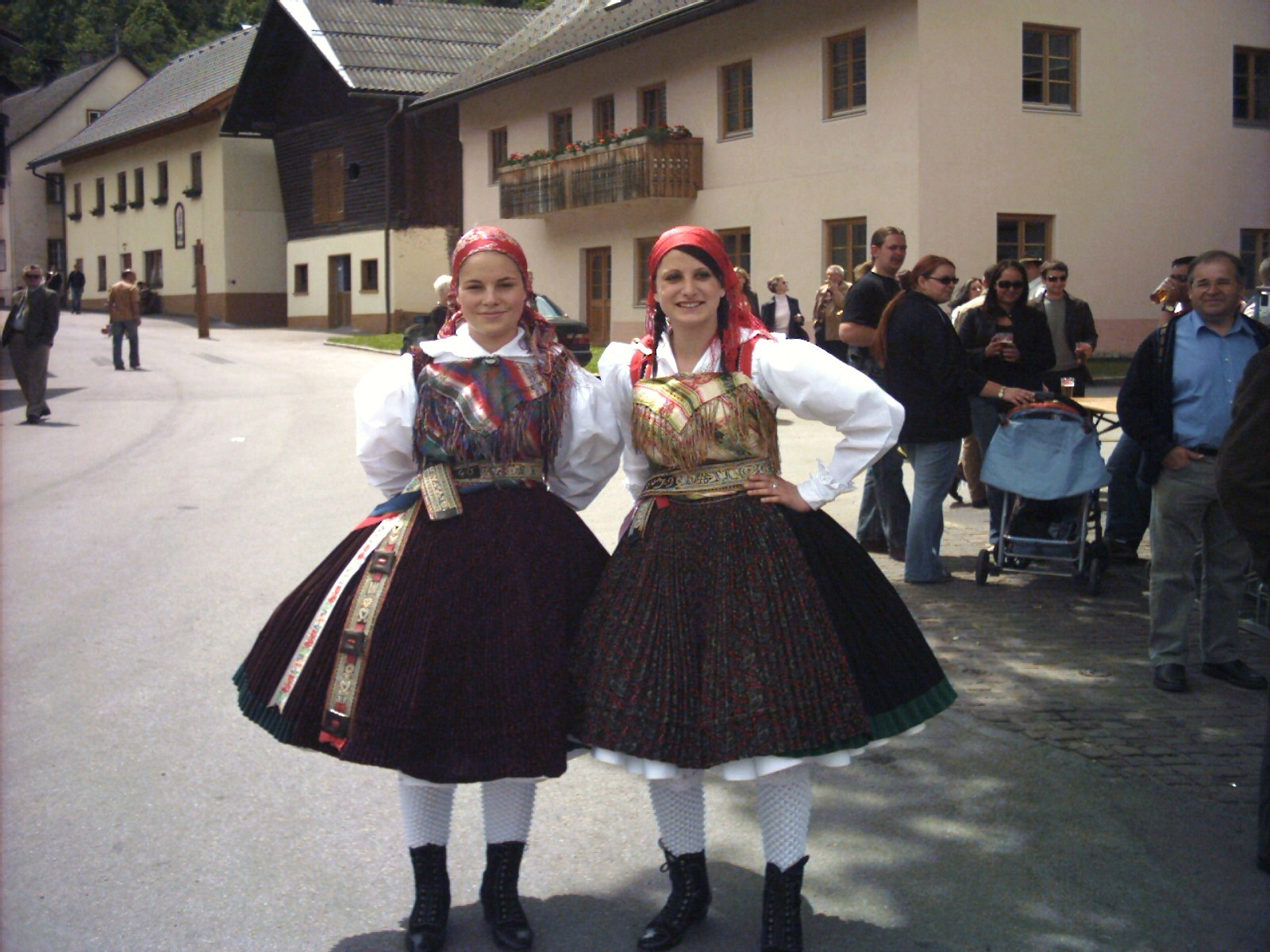
Gailtaler Tracht, Feistritz

At the Gail Valley quintain, a wooden pole is hammered into the ground. A wooden barrel, wrapped with hazel rings, is placed on the pole. Young men then ride past the barrel and hit it with metal bats, trying to cut hazel rings. They are dressed in Gailtal folk costumes (Trachten) and ride Noriker heavy horses. They ride three times to get a prize wreath. Then the boys sing a ceremonial song "God Give Us Good Time" (Bug nan dajte n dober čas), which is followed by a ceremonial folk dance named the High Dance (visoki rej) or the First Dance (prvi ples). Whoever manages to hit the wooden barrel down from its pole is rewarded with a flower wreath, which the rider carries on his arm for the rest of the day as a sign of his victory.

Boys take girls likewise dressed in colorful Gailtal costumes, under the linden tree (na rej pod lipo). Dancing is accompanied with songs in Slovene and German.

The quintain in Savlje has a more competitive nature. The men collect points when cutting hazel rings on the barrel. The winner is the one who scores the most points. They are dressed in Upper Carniola national costumes. After the game follows traditional Slovene festivities and a raffle.
