= Posavje District =

Posavje District could refer to:

- Posavje District (Independent State of Croatia), a district of the Independent State of Croatia
- Posavje District, Ljubljana, a district of the City Municipality of Ljubljana, central Slovenia
