= Bežigrajska soseska 7 =

Bežigrajska soseska 7 or BS 7 (English: Bežigrad neighborhood 7), more known as a soseska Ruski car (English: neighborhood Russian Tzar) is residential block neighborhood in the northern part of Ljubljana, built in the 1970s on agricultural areas, nearby the villages Ježica, Mala vas and Stožice. It belongs to the Posavje District. Nearby stands the famous inn, Russian Czar. Past neighborhood leads Dunajska cesta (Vienna road).
