= Ježica =

- Location in Slovenia
- Coordinates: 46°5′41.81″N 14°31′11.97″E
- Country: Slovenia
- Traditional region: Upper Carniola
- Statistical region: Central Slovenia
- Municipality: Ljubljana
- Elevation: 303 m (994 ft)

Ježica (pronounced [ˈjeːʒitsa]; German: Jeschza) is a formerly independent settlement in the northern part of the capital Ljubljana in central Slovenia. It is part of the traditional region of Upper Carniola and is now included with the rest of the municipality in the Central Slovenia Statistical Region.

== Geography ==
Ježica is a clustered settlement in an open, sunny area along the Sava River, originally consisting of a core of farms on the high terrace above the Sava. The soil is sandy and there are fields to the west.

== Name ==
Ježica was attested in written sources in 1356 as Gezziczsch (and as Yessicz in 1425 and Jesicz in 1464). The name is a diminutive derived from the Slovene common noun ježa ("small grassy slope between two flat areas in a valley"), referring to the local geography (cf. Ježa). In the past the German name was Jeschza.

== History ==
=== Roman era ===
The Roman road from Emona to Celeia passed through Ježica, crossing the Sava River, and a Roman settlement is believed to have stood at the site. In 1880 a Roman grave was discovered near the church. When the Roman Empire collapsed, migrating tribes destroyed the bridge. It was replaced with a ferry that operated until 1724.

=== Early modern era ===
In 1515, 6,000 peasants gathered where the spa now stands and negotiated with the imperial commissioners, led by Styrian governor Sigmund Dietrichstein. The officials tried to placate the peasants, but they were unsuccessful, leading to the 1515 Slovene Peasant Revolt.

In 1713, plans were made for the new road from Vienna to Trieste. The work was finished in 1730, and the new bridge was built in Ježica: the first since the destruction of the Roman bridge. Ježica was an important site because it controlled access to the bridge across the Sava; a large building known as Grad (literally, 'castle') was a former toll house for the bridge. The building was owned by the Tavčar family before the Second World War.

=== Modern era ===
A new bridge was built over the Sava in 1846, and was the basis for today's bridge. A school was built in Ježica in 1869, and regular schooling started in 1871. The Kamnik Railway was laid through Ježica in 1891, and a new train station named Tauzherhof was established at Ježica in 1893. The 1895 Ljubljana earthquake also caused damage in Ježica, especially to the church, which was repaired afterwards.

The first fire department was established in 1902 at the initiative of Mayor Anton Vilfan. In 1910, Ježica's first post office was established, the train station was renamed Jeschza, and water mains were installed. During the First World War, soldiers were quartered in people's homes, inns, and shops. Italian forces managed to approach Ježica in May, 1916 and Bregar's Meadow (Slovene: Bregarjev travnik) near the Russian Czar Inn was shelled.

=== Second World War ===
On April 11, 1941 Ježica was occupied up to the Sava River by the Italian Army, although the locals had expected occupation by the German Army. German forces occupied the territory east of the bridge, and the border between Italy and Germany was established at the Črnuče Bridge. A few months later, the border was shifted a few meters south. The border crossed an area with fields called Prod, below the villages of Savlje and Kleče. The Germans built a road through the area known as Nemška cesta (German Street), today's Obvozna cesta (Bypass Street). A new railway was also built, connecting Kamnik and the Upper Carniola Gorenjska Railway, which extended east to the village of Laze pri Dolskem. The border was secured with wire fencing, minefields, and watchtowers. The main border crossing was in Ježica, where the bus station is today. Two border checkpoints still stand today. On September 7, 1941 the first resistance against the Italian forces was carried out, when a night patrol of Italian border finance police was attacked in Mala Vas. Two policemen were badly injured. The date was declared a memorial day in Ježica in 1955. After the 1943 Armistice of Cassibile, the Italian army left Ježica along with the rest of Ljubljana, and the German army moved in. This led to establishment of Domobranstvo. The Slovene Partisans entered Ježica together with the rest of Ljubljana in May 1945.

=== SFR Yugoslavia ===
Rebuilding of Ježica began soon after the war. An agricultural cooperative was established in 1947. Bus service was established, and then a trolleybus in 1958, which was discontinued in 1968. A Partisan grave and cenotaph was created at the Stožice Cemetery in 1950, and a plaque honoring the People's Hero Danila Kumar was installed in 1955. In 1961, Ježica annexed the former village of Mala Vas na Posavju. In the 1970s, the BS 7 apartment blocks were built nearby, connecting urban area with the rest of Ljubljana. Ježica was annexed by the City of Ljubljana in 1974, ending its existence as an independent settlement.

=== Independent Slovenia ===
Ježica looks very different today than it did in the past, especially its surroundings. The small village became part of Ljubljana. Construction of new houses has redefined its landscape while the village's tourist industry has collapsed. However, a new park was built in 2014, extending from Ježica to Jarše and the route has become popular for horse riders and cyclists. Other recent projects include the installation of a roundabout in 2012, the renovation of the Črnuče bridge and the construction of Florjančkov Hram Hotel in 2014.

== Future ==
The City Municipality of Ljubljana has plans to extend Vienna Street (Dunajska cesta) from Russian Czar to Obvozna cesta, crossing Ježica. Obvozna cesta is also planned for renovation, and the road will cross Ježica through the bus station. A large number of houses are planned for demolition. On a grass field north of Russian Czar, there are plans for apartment blocks and business space as the new center of the community of Posavje. Opposition to the Dunajska extension exists among residents.

== Population changes ==
In 1787, there were 32 houses and 172 residents. In 1935 there were 131 residential buildings, 319 flats, 278 families, 510 working men and 574 women, and in 2013 Ježica had 500–600 residents.

== Streets ==
Ježica Street is a residential street in the upper part of the village, and Stara Ježica (old Ježica) is in the lower part. Na Produ ("on the river gravel") is a residential street on the Sava. Ulica Bratov Čebulj (Čebulj Brothers Street) is named after Alojz (1913-1942), Vinko (1914-1941) and Franc Čebulj (1916-1942), who fought for the Liberation Front of the Slovene Nation. Alojz died during World War II at Krvavec, Vinko was killed in Savlje and Franc was killed on the Osovnik hill above Škofja loka (where a memorial plaque stands).

Za gasilskim domom (behind the fire station) is a residential street. Ulica bratov Kunovar (Kunovar Brothers Street) is named after Franc (1909-1942) and Slavko (1919-1943) Kunovar, born in Ježica, who also fought with the Liberation Front of the Slovene Nation. Franc died in Udinboršt (near Kranj) and Slavko died in Kališe, Kamnik. Kališnikov trg (Kališnik Place) is named after Jože Kališnik, born in 1923 in Buč, an activist and became a partisan in 1942. He was killed the following year near Podutik.

Ulica Danile Kumar (Danila Kumar Street) was named after Danila Kumar (1921-1944), who was born in Hum at Kojsko. A soldier in the Tomšič Brigade in 1942, Kumar became an activist of the Liberation Front of the Slovene Nation and died at Škofja loka (near Lubnik). A school in Stožice is named after them.

Udvančeva ulica (Udvanc Street) is named after Matija Udvanc (1912-1942), who was born in Ježica. A locksmith, Udvanc was a member of the Yugoslavian Communist Party, a Yugoslav volunteer in the Spanish Civil War and a partisan. He died commanding the Selška Troop with Stane Žagar at the battle with the Germans in Planica, near Žabnica.

Kratka pot (Short Track) is a residential street near Spa Laguna. Tesovnikova ulica (Tesovnik Street) is named after Viktor Tesovnik (1928-1949), born in Nova Štifta, who was an activist with the Liberation Front of the Slovene Nation and became a soldier in 1944. An officer in the Yugoslav People's Army, he died from injuries in 1949.

== Tourism ==
Ježica began to develop at the end of the 19th century, when people from Ljubljana visited the town's inns. At that time the linden-lined Tyršer Road (present-day Dunajska Road) led there. The Sava was popular for bathing, and a spa was built. World War II put an end to tourism, but it began to revive in 1965 with the opening of an auto camp. Tourists, now mostly from abroad, stayed in Ježica because of its proximity to Ljubljana. In 1984 more than 25,000 tourists visited Bežigrad District (in which Ježica is located), 18th place in Slovenia. A new hotel is part of the Florjančkov hram complex.

=== Inns ===
Ježica's inns were popular weekend destinations for Ljubljana residents. At the beginning of the 20th century, notable inns were Tavčar (pri Tavčarju), Florjanček (pri Florjančku), Štern (pri Šternu), Aleš (pri Alešu) and Angelca (pri Angelci). The Tavčar, Štern and Florjanček still operate as inns, but the former Aleš and Angelca buildings remain.

Tavčarjev dvor, built in 1906, is the successor of an inn with the same name which operated next door. It is named after the German Count Tavčar, whose inn was known as Tavčar hoff or Tauzherhof. The inn was popular with Ljubljana residents, who visited on weekends to swim in the Sava. During World War II the Germans used it for bridge defense, and after the war police and residents stayed there. The inn was nationalized before the Bežigrad catering company managed it; for several decades it has been privately owned, and is now primarily a bar.

Restaurant Štern, built in 1928, was named after its first owner (who was from Upper Carniola). During World War II, the Italian army was billeted there. After the war it was nationalized and became the restaurant and spa of the Bežigrad District. The restaurant, still in operation, serves Slovenian and other dishes.

Florjančkov hram, also known as pri Florjančku (at Florjanček), has existed since 1792. Historian and literary critic Fran Levec was born here in 1846, and Slovenian poet France Prešeren was a frequent visitor. The restaurant specializes in Slovenian food.

=== Spa and resort ===
A spa was built during the 1930s, when a wine merchant named Stern built the first building and inn (which still stand). Next to them he built a dressing room and showers, and a stable also existed. Pools with sand followed. The war halted the spa's operation; after the war it was nationalized, and its manager made it a recreation center for Ježica. In 1965 an auto camp opened near the spa with cottages, bungalows, summer and winter swimming pools and a bowling alley. After 1991 it was denationalized and decayed, but four popular swimming pools remained until 2005. That year, the swimming pool was renovated, new hydro massage pools were built and the spa was renamed Laguna Ljubljana.

== Holidays ==
A Slovene quintain, known as štehvanje, was introduced to Ježica and neighboring villages in 1935. Originating in the Gail Valley, the event is held each June. A gasilska veselica (firefighters' party) has been held in May since 2012. A memorial day is observed on 7 September each year, near the street of the same name, for local activists resisting fascism in Ježica during World War II.

== Sava ==
The Sava has influenced the area, and during Roman times a bridge was built at Ježica. The region was flood-prone. On the 1825 Franciscan cadastre, two bridges higher than the main bridge over the Sava are seen bridging the two Sava branches; one is made of steel. Work was done on the river from 1895 to 1908 from Tacen to Šentjakob, and erosion increased until 1935. Groundwater made the water level fall 7 meters (23 ft) at the Kleče water station. In 1953 a hydroelectric power plant was built at Medvode, affecting the riverbed at Ježica.

During the 19th century, the Ježica riverside was a popular recreation area. Although water quality is currently too poor for swimming, it has improved since the second half of the 20th century and the municipality of Ljubljana plans to make the river safe for swimming again.

== Church ==
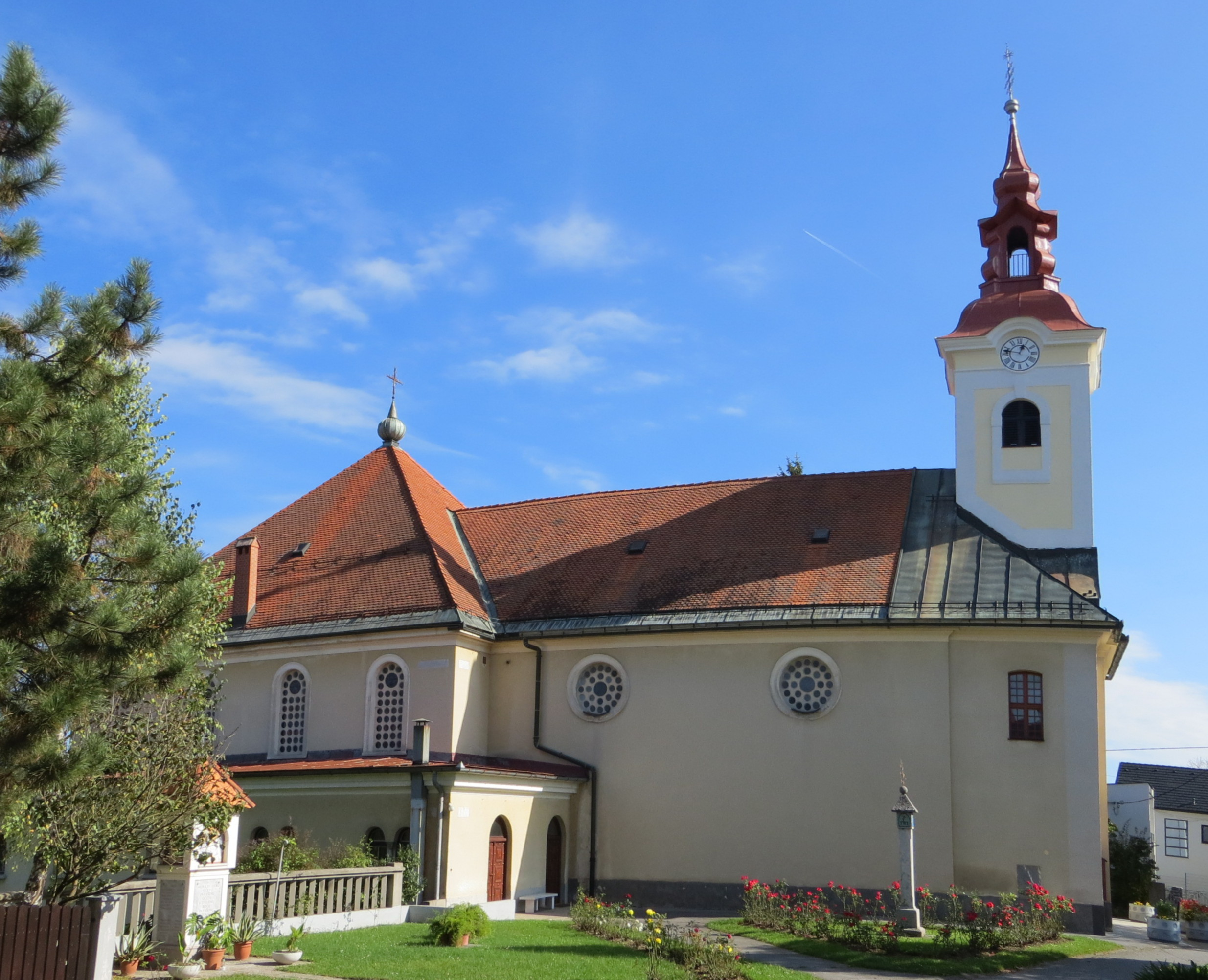
St. Cantianus's Church

The church in Ježica is dedicated to Saint Cantius and Companions and was built on the site of a medieval predecessor mentioned in written records in 1526. The new church was built from 1792 to 1802, and an east addition was built in 1938 based on plans by the architect Vinko Glanz (1902–1977). The painting of the Holy Cross is an 1802 work by Andreas Herrlein (1739–1837), the Stations of the Cross are the work of Leopold Layer (1752–1828), the pulpit painting by Mirko Šubic (1900–1976), and the mosaic by Stane Kregar (1905–1973). The main altar was designed by the architect Ciril Zazula (1924–1995) and the side altars by Janko Omahen (1898–1980). Ježica was originally part of the proto-parish of Saint Peter in Ljubljana. It became a quasi-parish in 1787 and was elevated to a parish in 1850. There is an old wayside shrine below the church.

== Other cultural heritage ==
- Bunker no. 1 stands on the right bank of the Sava River. It was built by the Yugoslav Army between 1939 and 1940.
- Bunker no. 2 stands near the railway bridge on the right bank of the Sava River. It was built by the Yugoslav Army between 1939 and 1940. It is the largest of the bunkers that protected the passage across the river.
- Bunker no. 3 stands on the right bank of the Sava River. It was built by the Yugoslav Army between 1939 and 1940.
- The house at Vienna Street (Dunajska cesta) no. 254 is a single-story building. In the past it was the Aleš Inn (pri Alešu). It has a symmetrical double-pitched roof and two dormers. The year 1850 is carved into the door frame.
- The driving school building was a toll house in the past, where tolls were collected along the road from Vienna to Trieste. The building was much smaller until the mid-19th century, when it was remodeled in the form it has today.
- There is a small bridge on Vienna Street (Dunajska cesta), near the Florjanček Inn (Florjančkov hram). It stands on a former branch of the Sava River that filled during flooding.
- A plaque was installed in 1974 at the spa to commemorate the 1515 peasant revolt.

== Notable people ==
Notable people that were born or lived in Ježica include:

- Jurij Japelj (1744–1807), first parish priest, translator, and philologist
- Franc Levec (1846–1916), literary historian, linguist, editor of the journal Ljubljanski zvon
- Alojzij Merhar (a.k.a. Silvin Sardenko) (1876–1942), poet, writer, playwright, and editor
- Jožef Prešern (1752–1835), parish priest and uncle of the poet France Prešeren
- Janez Pucelj (a.k.a. Ivan Pucelj) (1890–1964), poet and translator
- Matija Sitar (1860–1903), art historian
- France Škerl (1909–1985), historian
- Feliks Skerlep (1904–1980), horticulturalist
