= BS7 =

BS7 may refer to:

- BS7, a BS postcode area for Bristol, England
- BS7, a center drill bit size
- Bežigrajska soseska 7 (residential blocks in Ljubljana, Slovenia)
- BS 7 Dimensions of Copper Conductors Insulated Annealed, for Electric Power and Light, a British Standard
- Bonomi BS.7 Allievo Italia, a primary glider
