= Obrije =

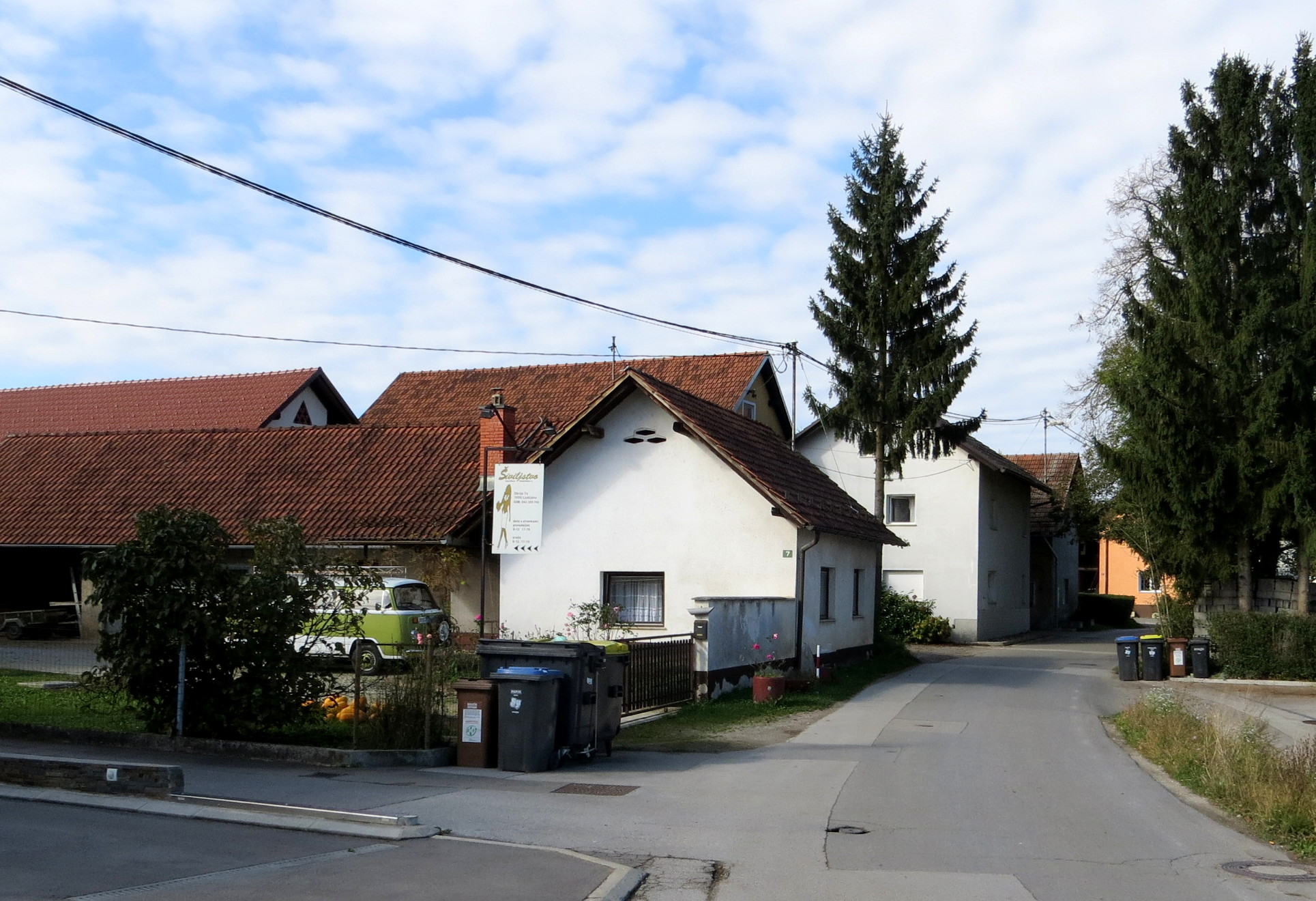

- Location in Slovenia
- Coordinates: 46°4′41.64″N 14°33′12.97″E
- Country: Slovenia
- Traditional region: Upper Carniola
- Statistical region: Central Slovenia
- Municipality: Ljubljana
- Elevation: 291 m (955 ft)

Obrije (pronounced [ɔˈbɾiːjɛ]; in older sources also Obrje) is a formerly independent settlement in the northeast part of the capital Ljubljana in central Slovenia. It is part of the traditional region of Upper Carniola and is now included with the rest of the municipality in the Central Slovenia Statistical Region.

== Geography ==
Obrije lies along the road from Hrastje to Stožice. It is a linear village on a terrace above the Sava River. Most of the houses stand on the edge of the terrace, but some also stand on a lower terrace further north, towards the river. Fields are located to the southeast.

== Name ==
Obrije was attested in written sources in 1490 as Albriach. The medieval attestations indicate that the name is not etymologically related to that of Abriach (Slovene: Obrije), a village in Austria's Völkermarkt District. The name was originally *Olbr′ane, a plural demonym, probably derived from the pre-Romance root *alber-. Liquid metathesis of this root also produced the Slovene dialect word laberje 'field debris, field detritus', indicating that the name Obrije referred to local geological conditions.

== History ==
Obrije was annexed by the City of Ljubljana in 1982, ending its existence as an independent settlement.

== Sizing plant ==
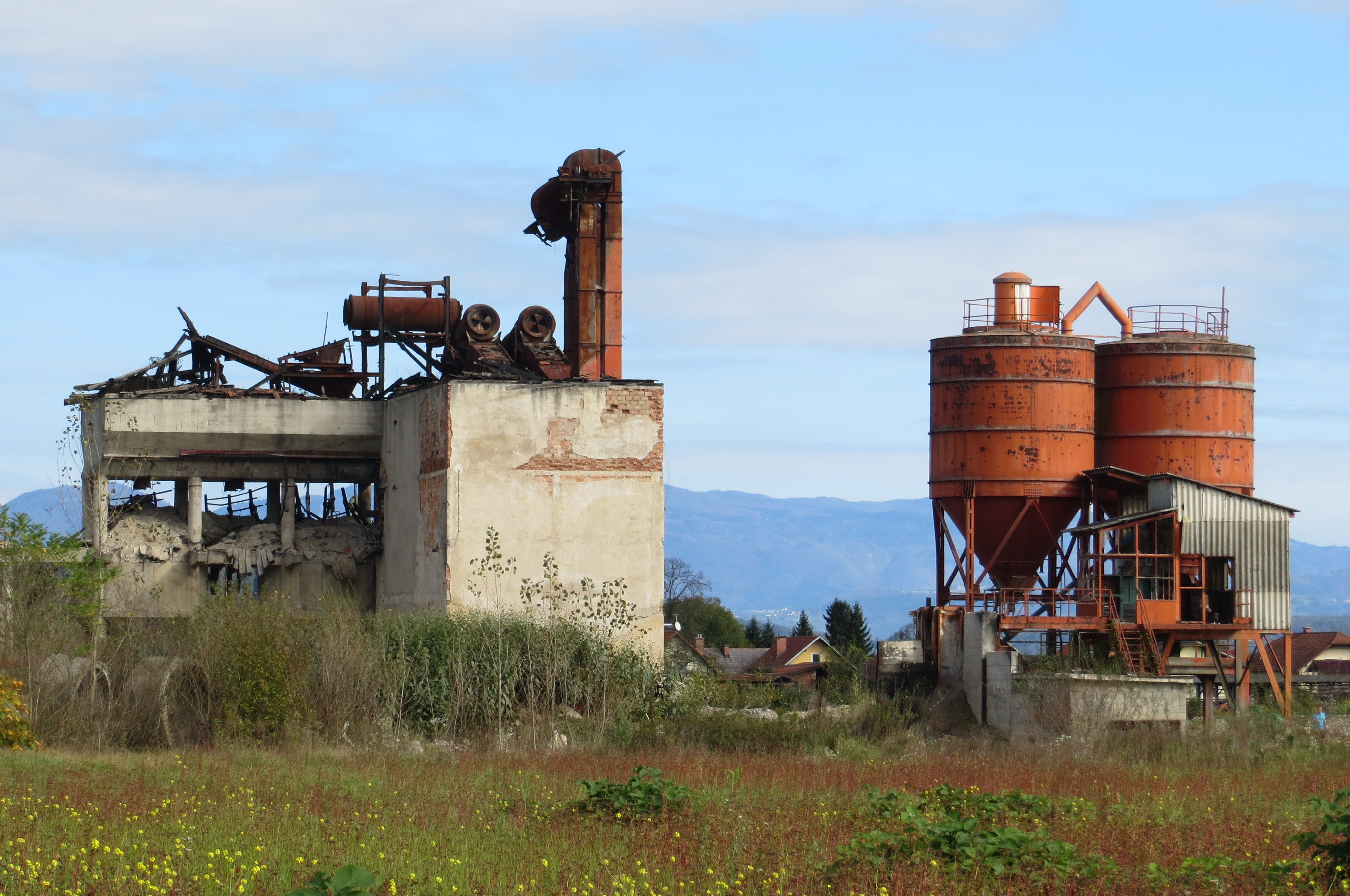
Sizing plant

The Gradis construction company started operating a gravel pit in Obrije in 1952. A sizing plant was later built at the site and was used for construction of the Nove Jarše housing development and other needs; it was abandoned in the 1990s. The plant was damaged in a fire on 1 November 2008.
