= Jarše District =

Jarše District Četrtna skupnost Jarše
- District
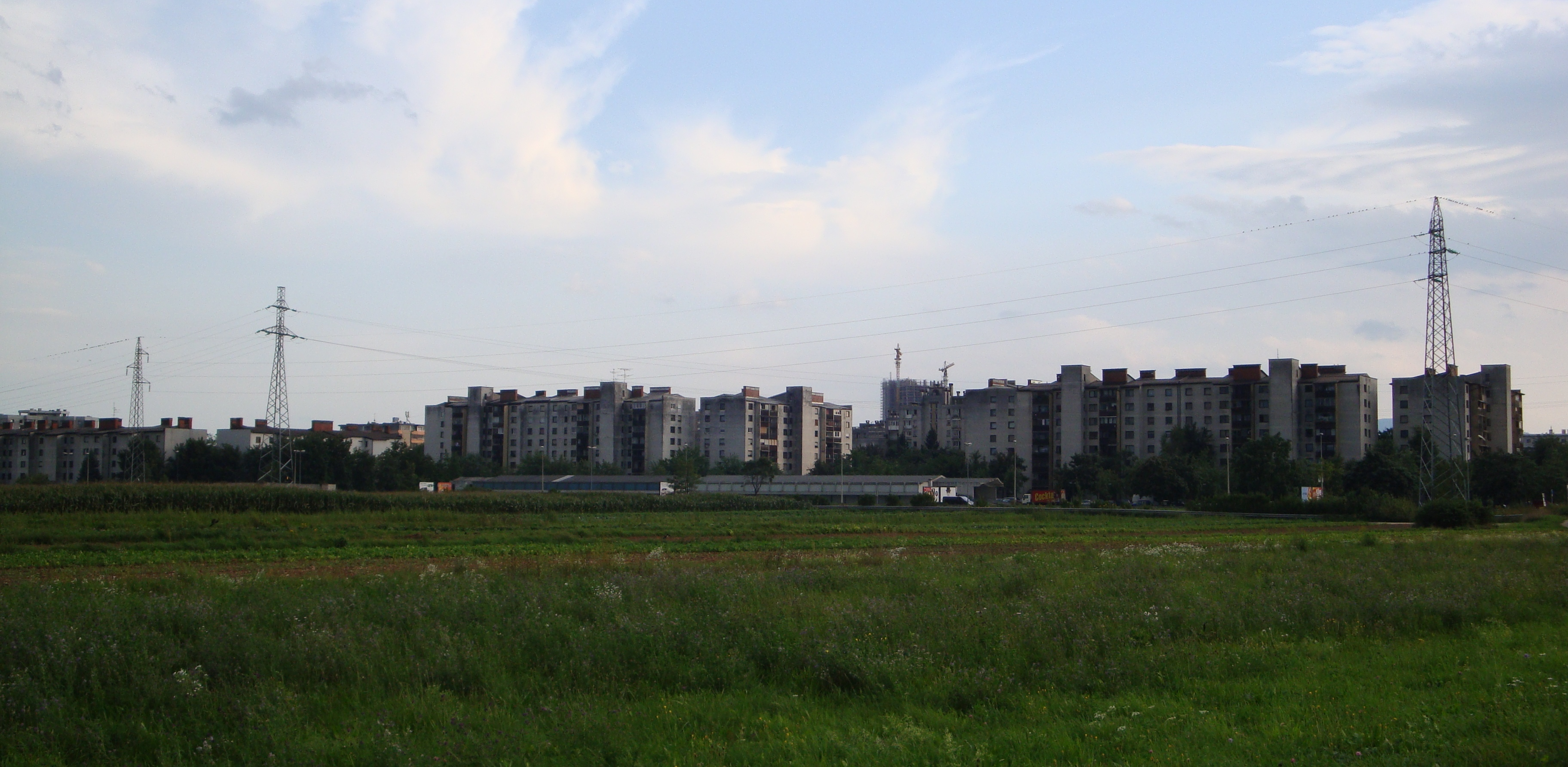
- The Nove Jarše neighborhood

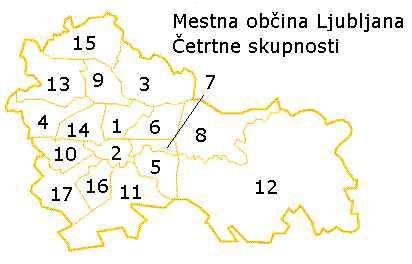
- Map of districts in Ljubljana. The Jarše District is number 6.

- Location in Slovenia
- Coordinates: 46°4′3.87″N 14°33′27.32″E
- Country: Slovenia
- Traditional region: Upper Carniola
- Statistical region: Central Slovenia
- Municipality: Ljubljana

Area
  - Total: 9.06 km^{2} (3.50 sq mi)

Population (2014)
  - Total: 13,908

The Jarše District (Slovene: Četrtna skupnost Jarše), or simply Jarše (Slovene pronunciation: [ˈjàːrʃɛ]), is a district (mestna četrt) of the City Municipality of Ljubljana, the capital of Slovenia. It is named after the former village of Jarše, now part of the Bežigrad District.

== Geography ==
The Jarše District is bounded on the south by the main railroad line; on the west by Šmartno Street (Šmartinska cesta), Sava Street (Savska cesta), Žale Street (Žalska cesta), the west edge of the Žale Cemetery, Jarše Street (Jarška cesta), Cleveland Street (Clevelandska ulica), and a line running between the former villages of Jarše and Obrije; on the north by the Sava River; and on the east by the A1 Freeway. The district includes the former villages of Hrastje, Obrije, Šmartno ob Savi, and Sneberje, as well as the workers' development of Zelena Jama and the Nove Jarše neighborhood. BTC City, the largest business, shopping, recreational, entertainment and cultural centre in Europe, is located in Jarše.
