= Tomačevo =

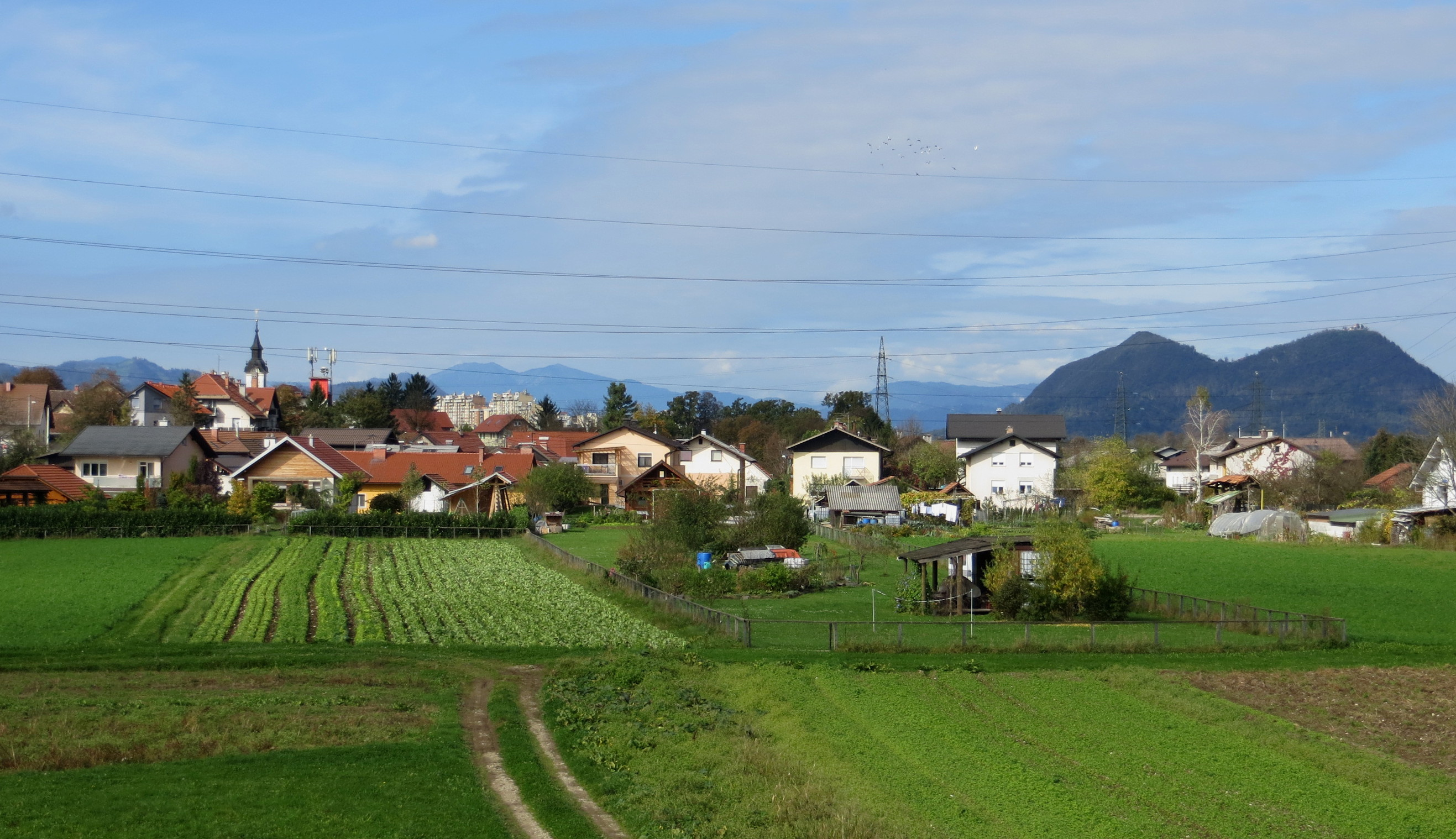

- Location in Slovenia
- Coordinates: 46°4′50.64″N 14°32′4.74″E
- Country: Slovenia
- Traditional region: Upper Carniola
- Statistical region: Central Slovenia
- Municipality: Ljubljana
- Elevation: 249 m (817 ft)

Tomačevo (pronounced [tɔˈmaːtʃɛʋɔ], German: Tomatschou) is a formerly independent settlement in the northeast part of the capital Ljubljana in central Slovenia. It is part of the traditional region of Upper Carniola and is now included with the rest of the municipality in the Central Slovenia Statistical Region.

== Geography ==
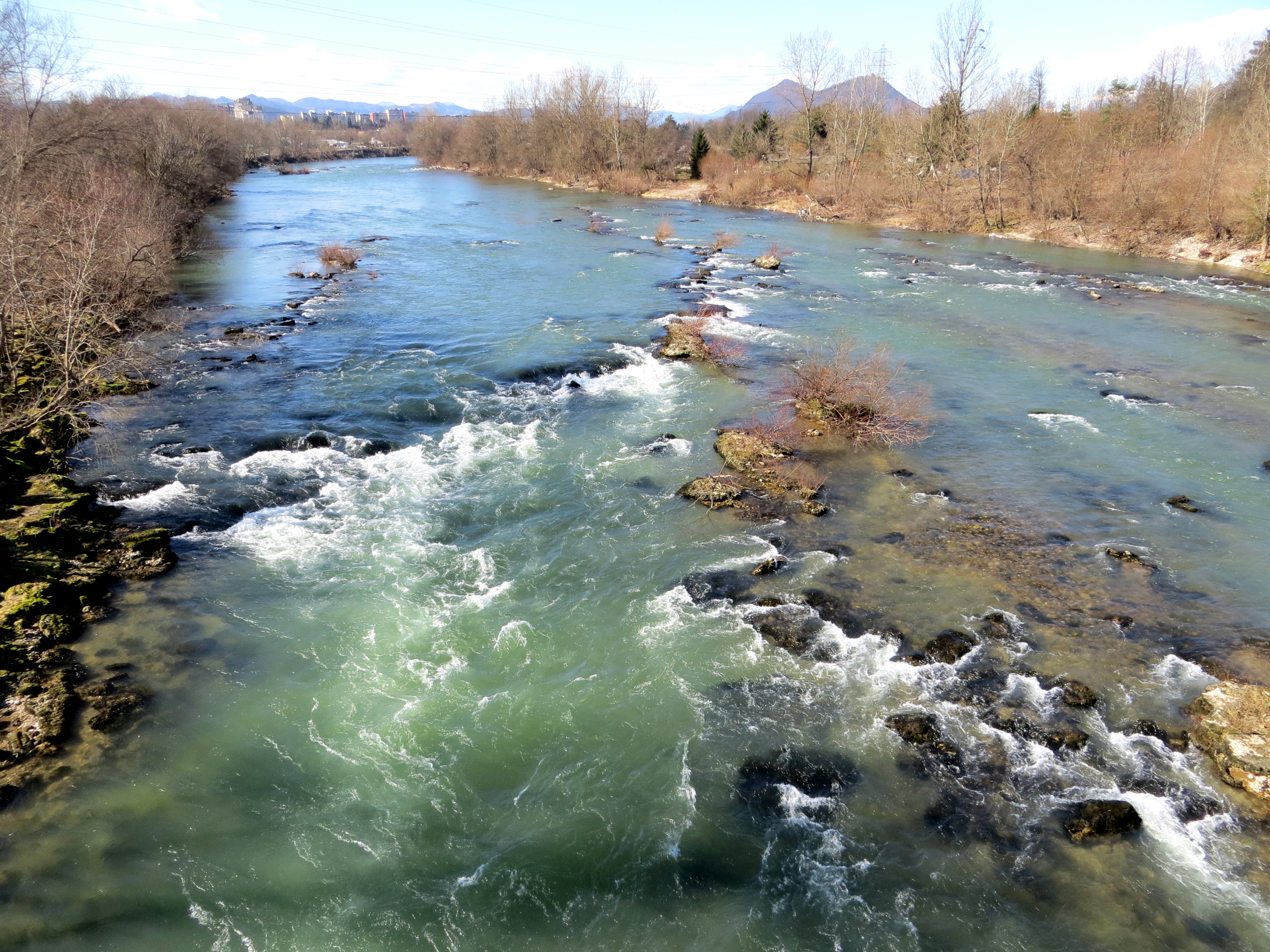
The Sava River at Tomačevo

Tomačevo lies along the road from Hrastje to Stožice. It is a village on a terrace above the Sava River. The soil is sandy, and fields are located to the south and west. The gravelly bank of the Sava north of the village was a popular swimming area in the past.

== Name ==
Tomačevo was attested in written sources in 1430 as Tomatsch (and as Tůmelsdorff in 1438, and Tümelsdorff in 1455). The name is a shortened form of *Tomačevo selo (literally, 'Tomač's village' or 'Tomac's village'), referring to some person associated with the place. The name is probably derived from a personal name such as *Tomislavъ, but may also be influenced by or connected with the saint's name Thomas.

== History ==
The Slovene linguist Matija Čop drowned in the Sava River at Tomačevo on 6 July 1835. The southern part of the village (including 18 houses with 256 people) was annexed by the City of Ljubljana in 1935. The remainder of Tomačevo was annexed by Ljubljana in 1974, ending its existence as an independent settlement.

== Church ==
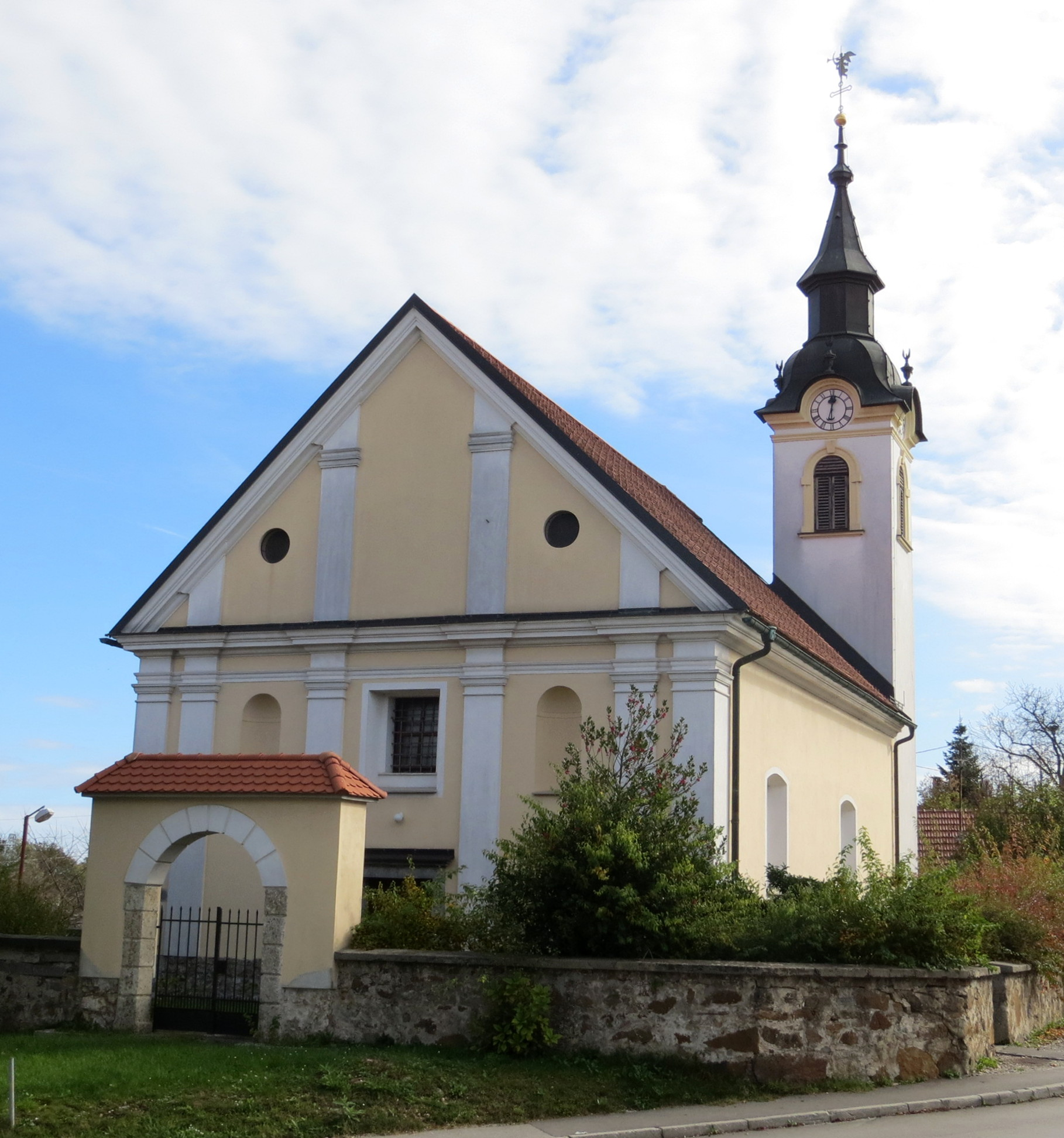
Saint Margaret's Church

The church in Tomačevo is dedicated to Saint Margaret. It was mentioned in written sources in 1526, and was rededicated by Bishop Thomas Chrön in 1604 after it had been desecrated by the Ottomans. The current building at the site is late Baroque in style. The main altar was created in 1837 by Matej Tomc, and the painting of Saint Margaret is an 1874 work by Miroslav Tomc. The side altar has a painting of Saint Florian and Saint Gregory Thaumaturgus.

== Notable people ==
Notable people that were born or lived in Tomačevo include:

- Ivan Kavčič (a.k.a. Nande, 1913–1943), Partisan and People's Hero
- Franc Schumi (1848–1916), local historian
- Martin Semrajc (1825–1849), poet
