= Spodnje Jarše, Domžale =

Spodnje Jarše
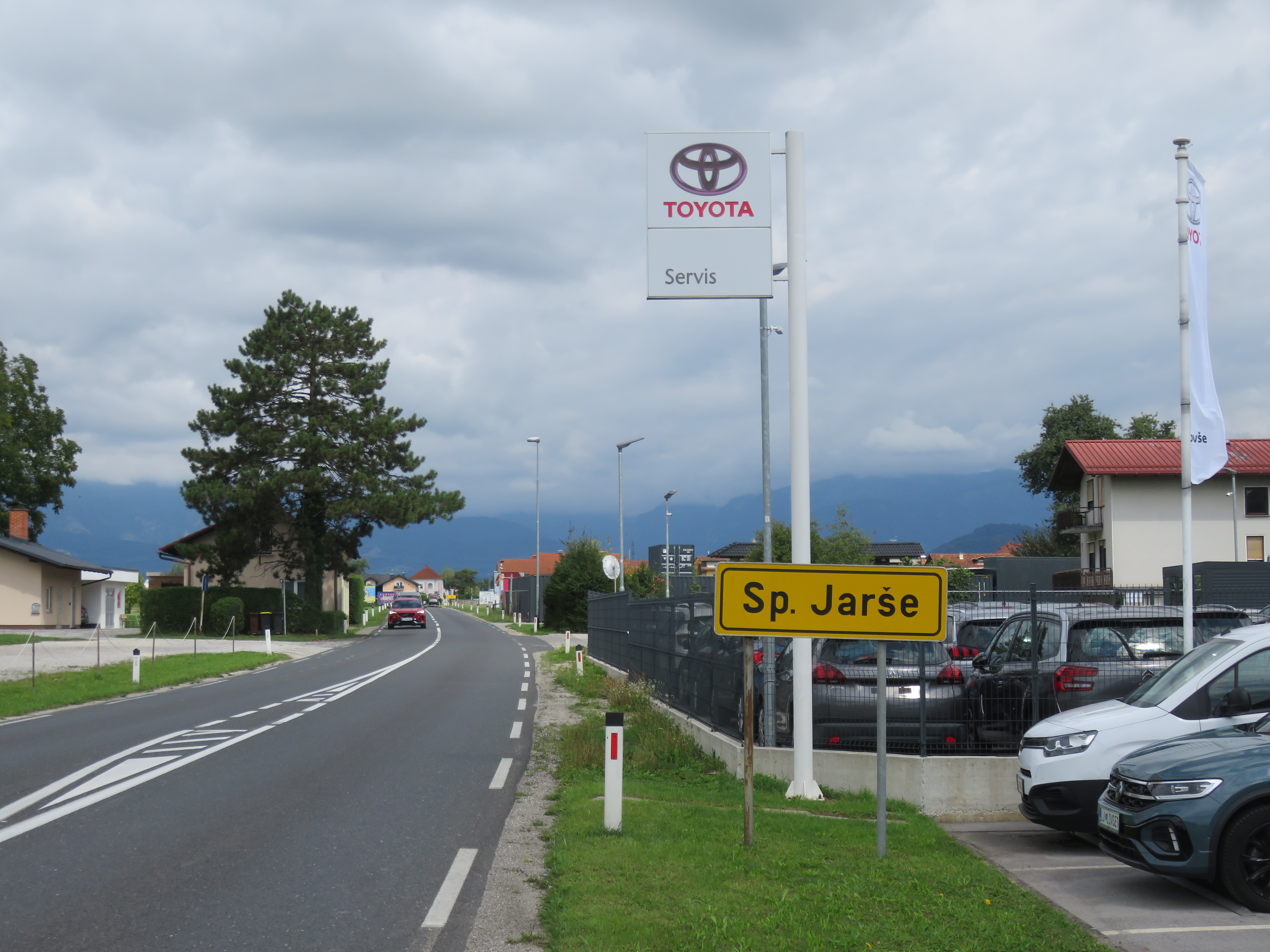

- Location in Slovenia
- Coordinates: 46°9′5.52″N 14°35′49.62″E
- Country: Slovenia
- Traditional region: Upper Carniola
- Statistical region: Central Slovenia
- Municipality: Domžale

Area
  - Total: 0.34 km^{2} (0.13 sq mi)
- Elevation: 309 m (1,014 ft)

Population (2020)
  - Total: 736
  - Density: 2,200/km^{2} (5,600/sq mi)

Spodnje Jarše (pronounced [ˈspoːdnjɛ ˈjaːɾʃɛ]; German: Unterjarsche) is a settlement on the right bank of the Kamnik Bistrica River in the Municipality of Domžale in the Upper Carniola region of Slovenia.
