= Zgornje Jarše, Domžale =

Zgornje Jarše
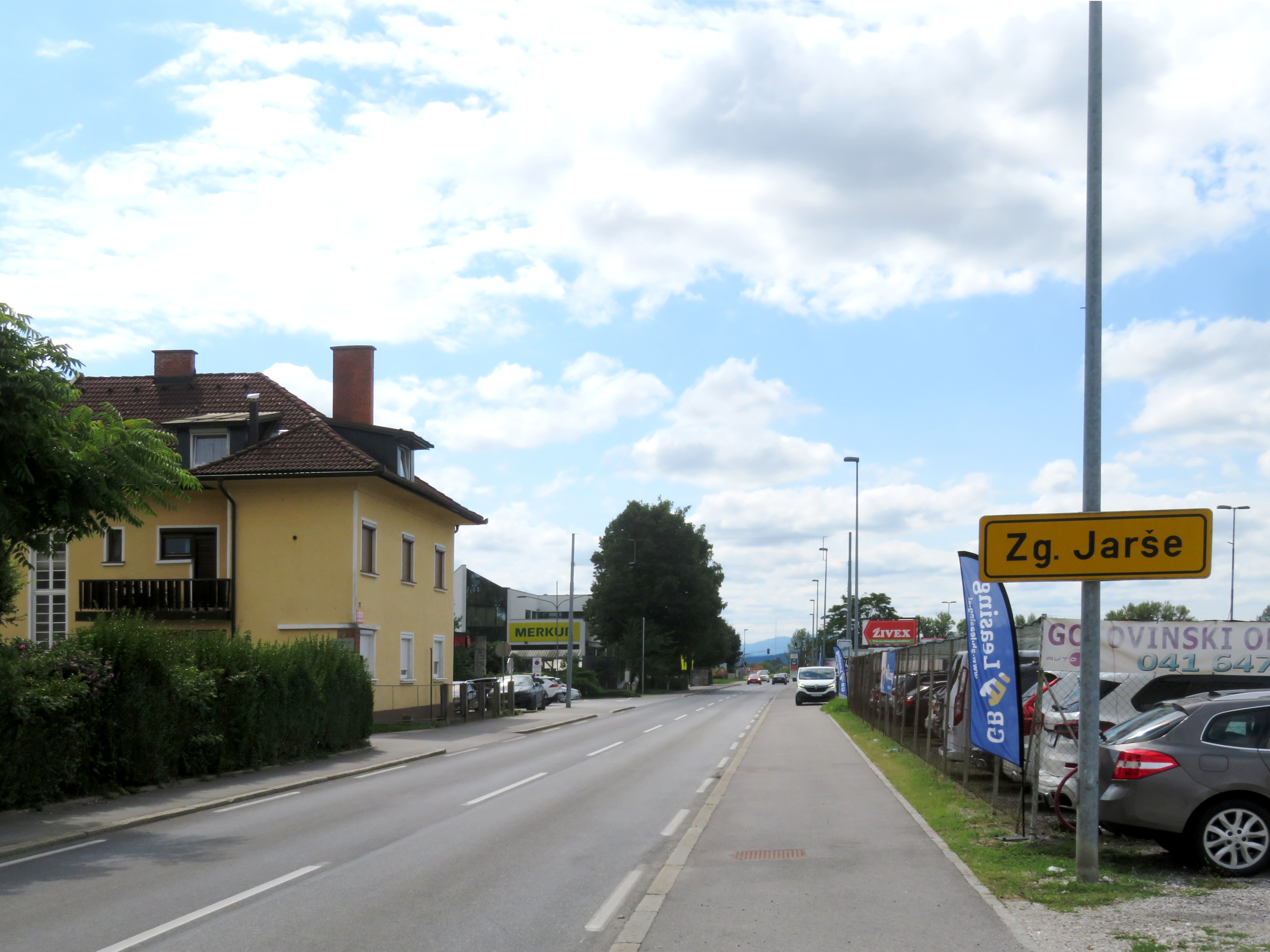

- Location in Slovenia
- Coordinates: 46°9′45.54″N 14°35′24.6″E
- Country: Slovenia
- Traditional region: Upper Carniola
- Statistical region: Central Slovenia
- Municipality: Domžale

Area
  - Total: 0.65 km^{2} (0.25 sq mi)
- Elevation: 319.1 m (1,047 ft)

Population (2020)
  - Total: 390
  - Density: 600/km^{2} (1,600/sq mi)

Zgornje Jarše (pronounced [ˈzɡóːrnjɛ ˈjàːrʃɛ]; German: Oberjarsche) is a settlement on the right bank of the Kamnik Bistrica River north of Domžale and east of Mengeš in the Upper Carniola region of Slovenia.
