= Savlje =

- Location in Slovenia
- Coordinates: 46°5′19″N 14°30′23″E
- Country: Slovenia
- Traditional region: Upper Carniola
- Statistical region: Central Slovenia
- Municipality: Ljubljana
- Elevation: 305 m (1,001 ft)

Savlje (pronounced [ˈsaːu̯ljɛ]; German: Saule) is a formerly independent settlement in the northern part of the capital Ljubljana in central Slovenia. It is part of the traditional region of Upper Carniola and is now included with the rest of the municipality in the Central Slovenia Statistical Region.

== Geography ==
Savle is a ribbon village along the road from Ježica to Šentvid, standing on the edge of the terrace above the Sava River. A hamlet of the settlement, known as Spodnje Savlje (literally, 'Lower Savlje'), stands below the terrace. The soil in the area is partially sand and partially a mix of sand and loam. Fields lie to the north and south of the village. Savlje's water supply is provided by the pumping station at Kleče.

== Name ==
Savlje was attested in historical sources in 1161 as Sawelach (and as Sevlach in 1282 and Cvezlach in 1312). The name is derived from the demonym *Savľane, referring to people living near the Sava River.

== History ==
The first umbrella factory in Yugoslavia operated in Savlje; it was founded in 1882 by Josip Vidmar (1859–1950), the father of the communist politician Josip Vidmar. During the interwar period, the underground communist publication Rdeči prapor (Red Banner) was published in 1931 at the Zatler house in the village, which also served as a refuge for Communist Party members. A plaque on the building commemorates the fact.

During the Second World War, house no. 37 was used as an interrogation center by Italian-backed Anti-Communist Volunteer Militia (MVAC) forces. The wartime border between territory annexed by Italy and Germany initially ran along Savlje Street (Saveljska cesta), dividing the village, but was later shifted to fields further north, whereupon Savlje became part of Italy's Province of Ljubljana.

In 1952, the Tops typewriter factory was established in Savlje. Savlje was annexed by the city of Ljubljana in 1974, ending its existence as an independent settlement.

== Cultural heritage ==
Cultural heritage in Savlje includes the following:

- A chapel-shrine dedicated to the Virgin Mary stands next to the house at Savlje no. 32. It is decorated in Neoclassical style, with a prominent pediment and inscription. The interior contains a painting and a statue of the Virgin Mary. The shrine dates from the early 20th century.
- The two-story house at Selan Street (Selanova ulica) no. 20 has a rectangular layout and a gently sloping roof. The exterior is decorated in plaster accentuated with stone and wrought-iron elements, and the yard is landscaped. The house was built in the first half of the 20th century.
- The village center of Savlje is registered as cultural heritage. It consists of single-story houses with steep symmetrical tiled double-pitched roofs standing perpendicular to the main road, with outbuildings set back from the road.
- A form of quintain known as štehvanje was introduced to Savlje and neighboring villages in 1935. This Slovenian competition originates from the Gail Valley, and the event is held in June.

== Notable people ==
Notable people that were born or lived in Savlje include:

- Franc Hvastija (1911–1999), opera singer
- Ivan Selan (1902–1981), counterfeiter and cartographer
