= Planica, Kranj =

Planica
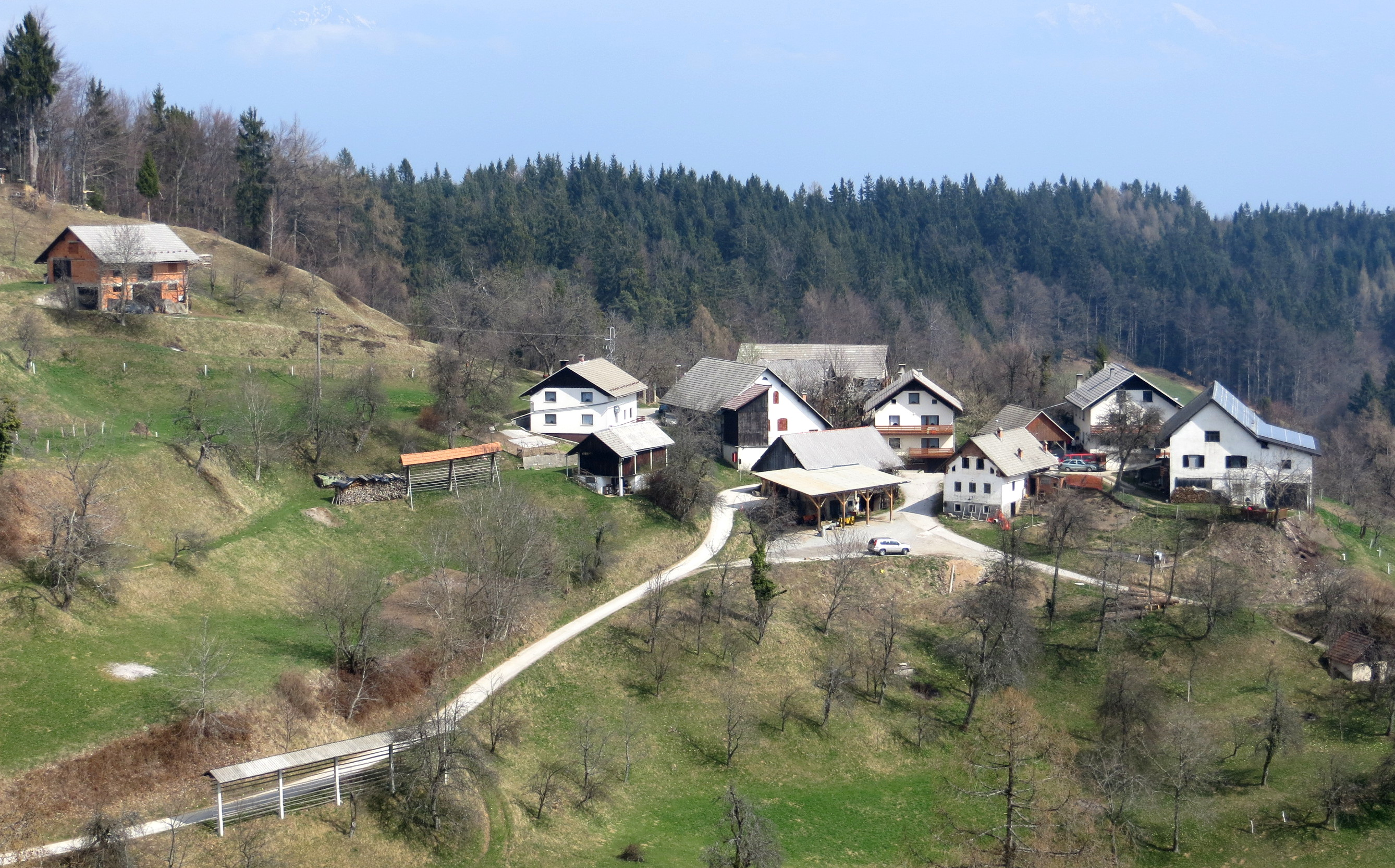

- Location in Slovenia
- Coordinates: 46°12′46.08″N 14°16′58.42″E
- Country: Slovenia
- Traditional region: Upper Carniola
- Statistical region: Upper Carniola
- Municipality: Kranj

Area
  - Total: 0.64 km^{2} (0.25 sq mi)
- Elevation: 731.4 m (2,400 ft)

Population (2002)
  - Total: 15

Planica (pronounced [plaˈniːtsa]) is a small settlement in the hills west of Kranj in the Upper Carniola region of Slovenia.

== Church ==
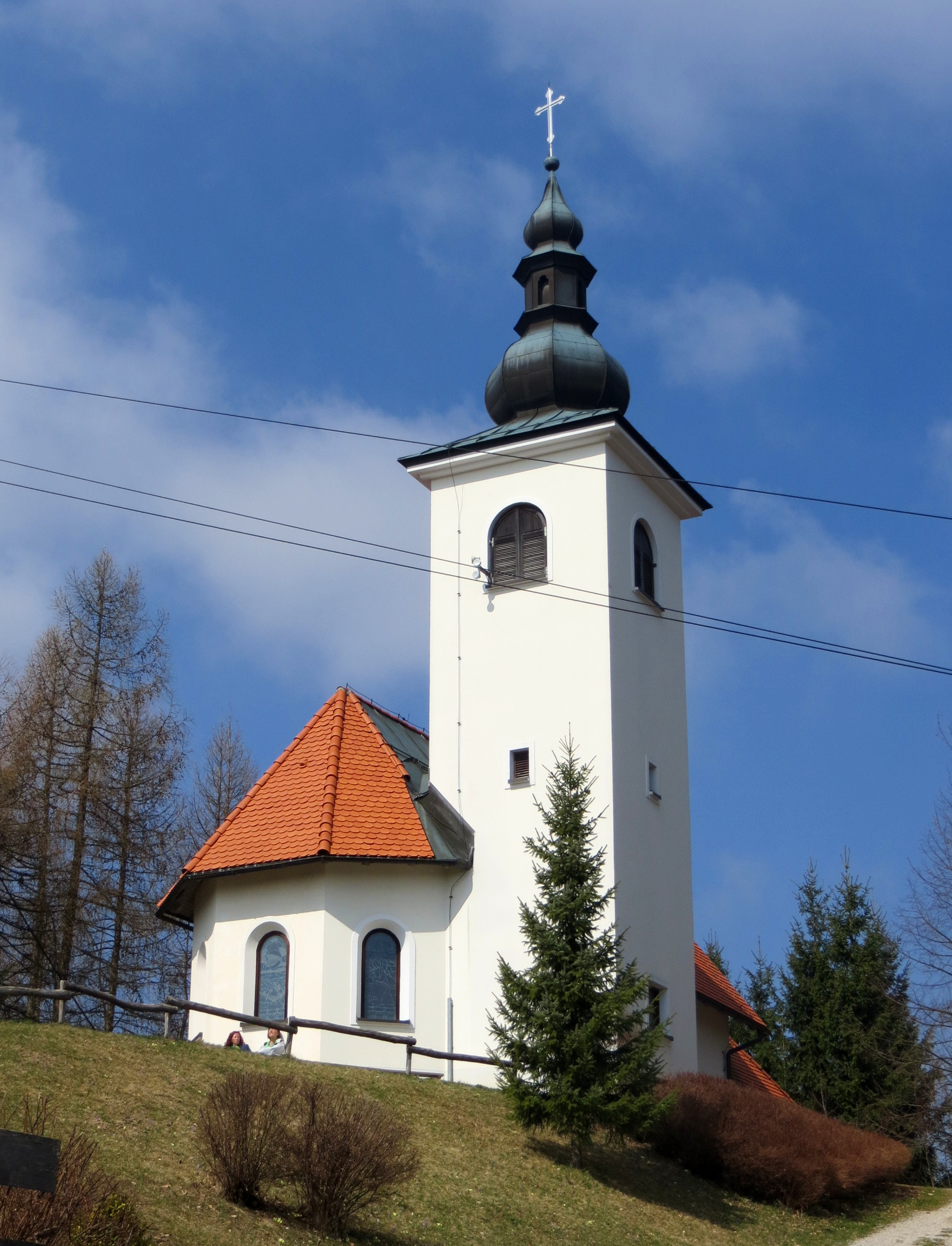
Archangel Gabriel Church

The church on a small hill above the settlement is dedicated to Archangel Gabriel and belongs to the Parish of Stara Loka. It offers good views of the surrounding Škofja Loka Hills and part of the Kamnik Alps. The church dates from the late 15th century and was destroyed by the Partisans in 1945. It was reconstructed in 1994 and reconsecrated in 1995.
