= Srednje Jarše =

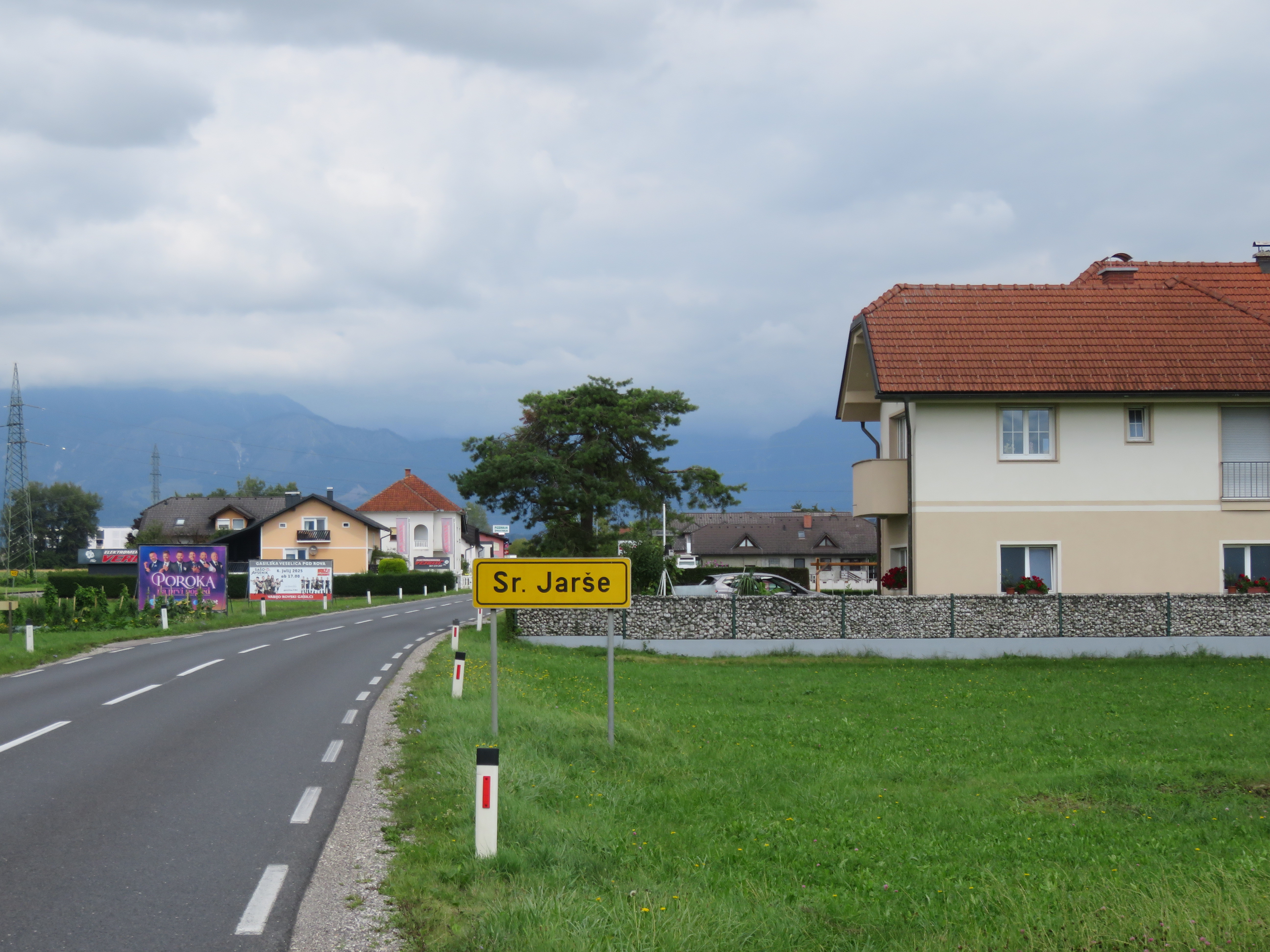

- Location in Slovenia
- Coordinates: 46°9′21.34″N 14°35′36.45″E
- Country: Slovenia
- Traditional region: Upper Carniola
- Statistical region: Central Slovenia
- Municipality: Domžale

Area
  - Total: 0.37 km^{2} (0.14 sq mi)
- Elevation: 313.4 m (1,028 ft)

Population (2020)
  - Total: 839
  - Density: 2,300/km^{2} (5,900/sq mi)

Srednje Jarše (pronounced [ˈsɾeːdnjɛ ˈjaːɾʃɛ]; German: Mitterjarsche) is a settlement on the right bank of the Kamnik Bistrica River just north of Domžale, in the Upper Carniola region of Slovenia.
