= Mala Vas (Ljubljana) =

Mala Vas Mala Vas na Posavju (1955–1961)
- Location in Slovenia
- Coordinates: 46°4′58″N 14°31′21″E
- Country: Slovenia
- Traditional region: Upper Carniola
- Statistical region: Central Slovenia
- Municipality: Ljubljana
- Elevation: 300 m (980 ft)

Mala Vas (pronounced [ˈmaːla ˈʋaːs]; Slovene: Mala vas, German: Malawaß), last officially named Mala Vas na Posavju during its existence as an independent settlement, is a locality in the northern part of the capital Ljubljana in central Slovenia. It is part of the traditional region of Upper Carniola and is now included with the rest of the municipality in the Central Slovenia Statistical Region.

== Geography ==
Mala Vas is a clustered settlement in an open, sunny area along the Sava River. The soil is sandy and there are fields near the river. It stands along Vienna Street (Dunajska cesta), with the old village core just to the east, below the terrace of the Sava River. New construction caused Mala Vas become contiguous with built-up parts of Ljubljana and neighboring villages by the 1970s.

== Name ==
The original name of the settlement, Mala vas (literally, "small village"), was changed to Mala Vas na Posavju ("small village in the Sava Valley") in 1955 to distinguish the settlement from others with the same name. Names such as Mala vas are common in Slovenia; the second element, vas, refers to a small rural settlement in the countryside.

== History ==
Mala Vas was annexed by Ježica in 1961, ending its existence as an independent settlement. Together with Mala Vas, Ježica was annexed by the city of Ljubljana in 1974.

== Cultural heritage ==
Cultural heritage in Mala Vas includes the following:

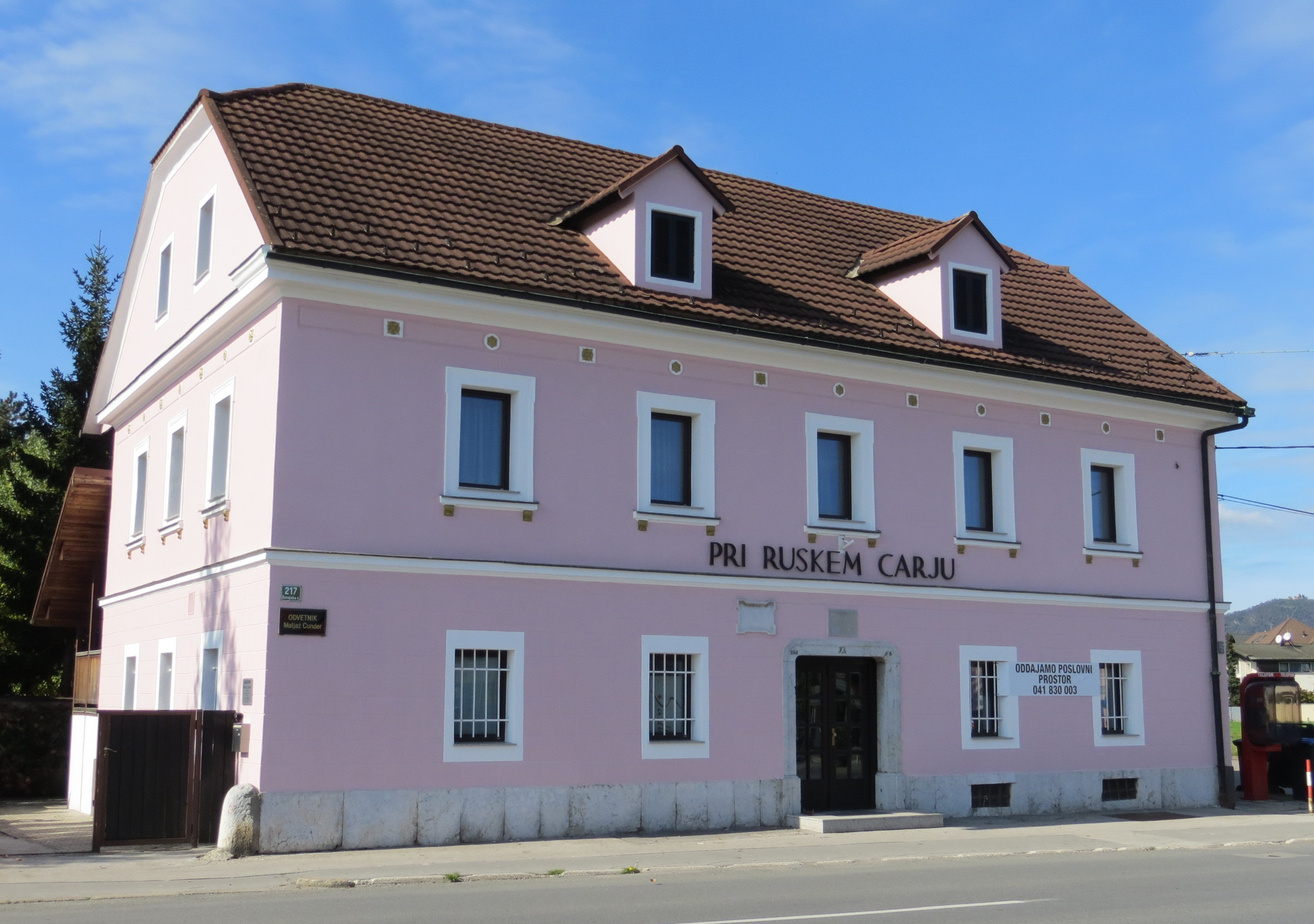
View from the street

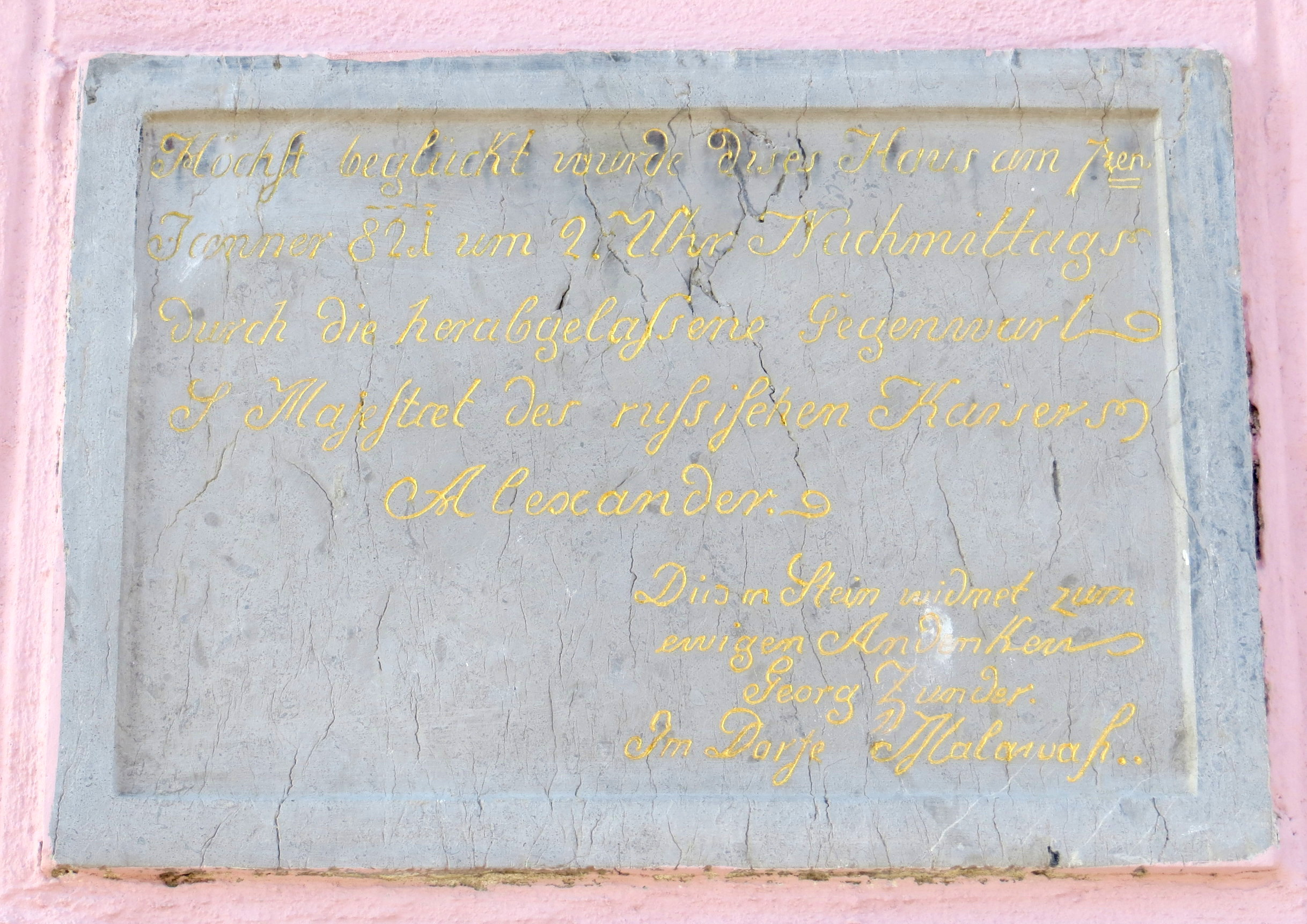
Plaque over the door

The Russian Czar Inn
- The Russian Czar Inn (gostilna Pri Ruskem carju) stands at Vienna Street (Dunajska cesta) no. 217. It is an L-shaped masonry business and catering structure. The year 1868 is carved into the stone casing around the door facing the street. The structure preserves original vaulted rooms and many older architectural elements. The building's name refers to the fact that Alexander I of Russia stopped at the site in 1821 during the Congress of Laibach, as noted on the plaque over the door.
- A form of quintain known as štehvanje was introduced to Mala Vas and neighboring villages in 1935. This Slovenian competition originates from the Gail Valley, and the event is held in June.

== Notable people ==
Notable people that were born or lived in Mala Vas include:

- Karel Robida (1804–1877), physicist and writer
- Janko Skerlep (1894–1981), photographer
