= Kleče (Ljubljana) =

- Location in Slovenia
- Coordinates: 46°5′29″N 14°30′00″E
- Country: Slovenia
- Traditional region: Upper Carniola
- Statistical region: Central Slovenia
- Municipality: Ljubljana
- Elevation: 300 m (980 ft)

Kleče (pronounced [ˈkleːtʃɛ]; German: Kletsche) is a formerly independent settlement in the northern part of the capital Ljubljana in central Slovenia. It is part of the traditional region of Upper Carniola and is now included with the rest of the municipality in the Central Slovenia Statistical Region.

== Geography ==
Kleče is a ribbon village along the road from Savlje to Šentvid, with most of the houses on the north side of the road. Restrictions were placed on new construction due to the presence of a pumping station near the village in a grove of pines. The soil in the area is sandy, and there are tilled fields extending from the settlement to the north and south. As the land approaches the Sava River it becomes wooded, primarily with hornbeam and oak.

== Name ==
Kleče was attested in historical sources as Cletschach in 1359 and 1444 (and as Cleczach in 1363 and Kletsch in 1458, among other spellings). It is one of several settlements that share this name, all of which lie along rivers. The name is ultimately derived from the common noun kleč 'gravel deposit covered with shallow soil', referring to the local geography. The feminine plural form is a result of reanalysis of a demonym derived from the common noun.

== History ==
Construction of the pumping station for the Ljubljana water system began in Kleče in 1888 and was completed in 1890. During the Second World War, the Italian–German border ran along the main road, separating Kleče from neighboring Savlje. Later, the border was shifted to fields to the north. Kleče was annexed by Ljubljana in 1974, ending its existence as a separate village. Kleče has largely retained its rural character today, although urbanization is increasing in the settlement.

== Cultural heritage ==
Cultural heritage in Kleče includes the following:

- The house at Kleče no. 22 was a large two-story structure with a symmetrical double-pitched roof. The year 1895 was carved above the entrance, which was somewhat recessed. The side facing the yard had a partial ground-floor arcade, and the structure once served as the Urh Inn (Slovene: gostilna pri Urhu). It stood in the center of Kleče facing the main road.
- The village center of Kleče is registered as cultural heritage. It preserves a ribbon settlement layout aligned with the terrace of the Sava River, and with buildings following the perpendicular property divisions.
- A form of quintain known as štehvanje was introduced to Kleče and neighboring villages in 1935. This Slovenian competition originates from the Gail Valley, and the event is held in June.

== Notable people ==
Notable people that were born or lived in Kleče include:

- Jakob "Jaka" Avšič (1896–1978), communist politician
