= Jarše (Ljubljana) =

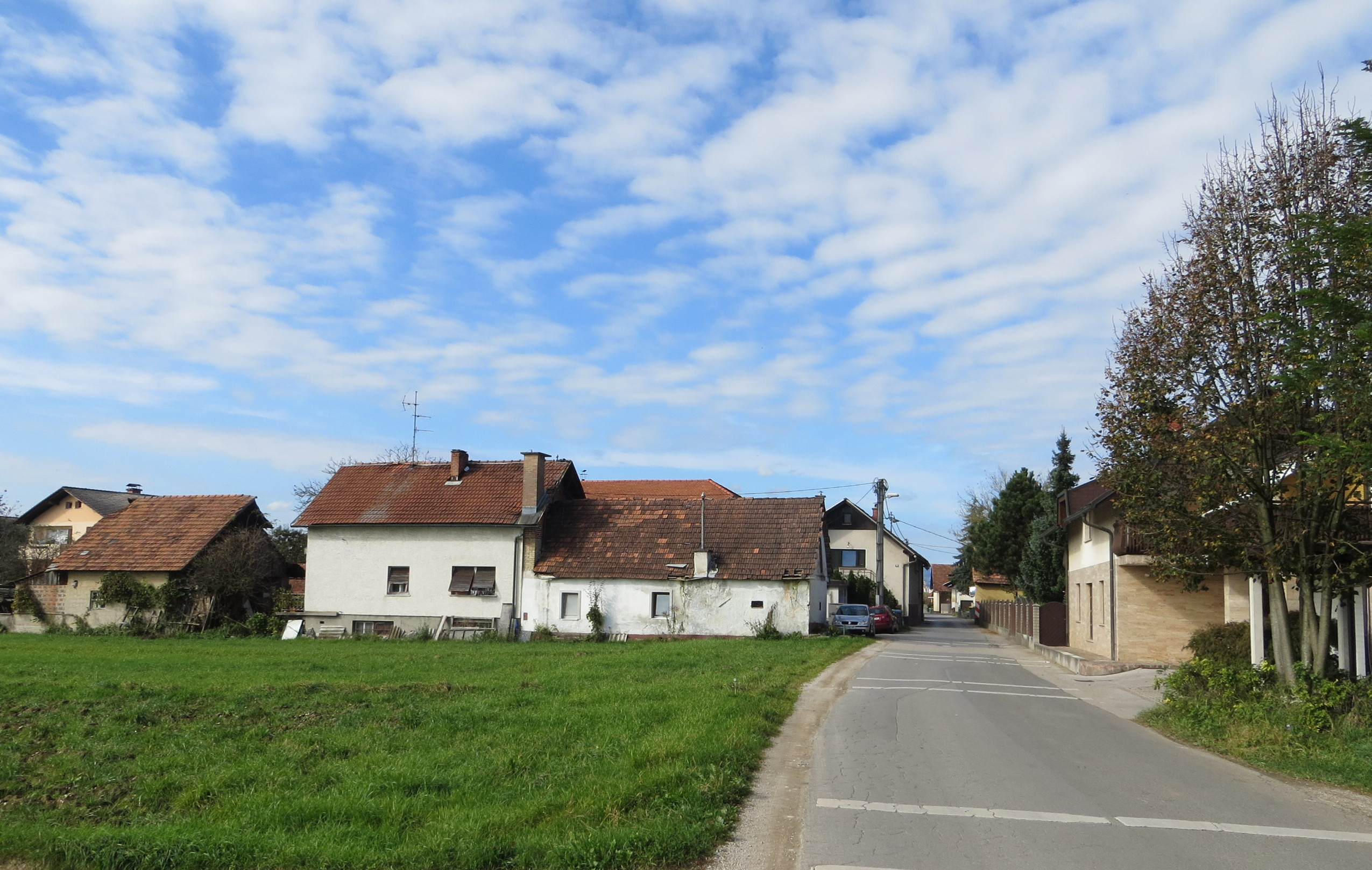

- Location in Slovenia
- Coordinates: 46°4′48.61″N 14°32′43.67″E
- Country: Slovenia
- Traditional region: Upper Carniola
- Statistical region: Central Slovenia
- Municipality: Ljubljana
- Elevation: 295 m (968 ft)

Jarše (Slovene pronunciation: [ˈjàːɾʃɛ]) is a former village in the northeast part of Ljubljana, the capital of Slovenia.

== Geography ==
The original village core of Jarše lies on a terrace above the Sava River along the old main road from Ježica to Hrastje. Before the Second World War, the part of the Sava near the village was a popular swimming area. The soil is shallow and sandy, and there are fields to the south. Administratively it is part of the city's Bežigrad District. The newer part of Jarše —Nove Jarše (literally, 'new Jarše')—lies further south, east of the Žale Central Cemetery in the neighboring Jarše District.

== Name ==
Jarše was attested in written records in 1438 as Jarischach (and as Jerischa in 1451). The name is derived from the plural demonym *Jariščane 'residents of Jarišče'. This name is probably based on the obsolete common noun *jara 'heat (of the sun)', referring to a place characterized by such heat. A less likely hypothesis derives the name from the adjective jar 'sown in spring' or 'weak' or 'angry' because the suffix -išče is not found with adjectival roots, and also for accentual reasons. Both accentual reasons and the local geography rule out derivation of the name from jar 'place where the water foams'. The old village center to the north is known as Stare Jarše (literally, 'old Jarše') or Spodnje Jarše (literally, 'lower Jarše'), and the newer part to the south as Nove Jarše (literally, 'new Jarše') or Zgornje Jarše (literally, 'upper Jarše').

== History ==
The capitals of two Roman columns were found in the village, testifying to early settlement. The southern, newer part of Jarše (including 28 houses with 327 residents) was annexed by the City of Ljubljana in 1935. After the Second World War, many residential, commercial, and industrial buildings were built in the newer part of Jarše. City water mains were connected to Jarše in 1961. The remainder of Jarše was annexed by Ljubljana in 1982, ending its existence as a separate settlement.

== Notable people ==
Notable people that were born or lived in Jarše include:

- Jakob Dimnik (1856–1924), education specialist, journalist, and editor
