= Quintain (jousting) =

Equestrian sport derived from jousting

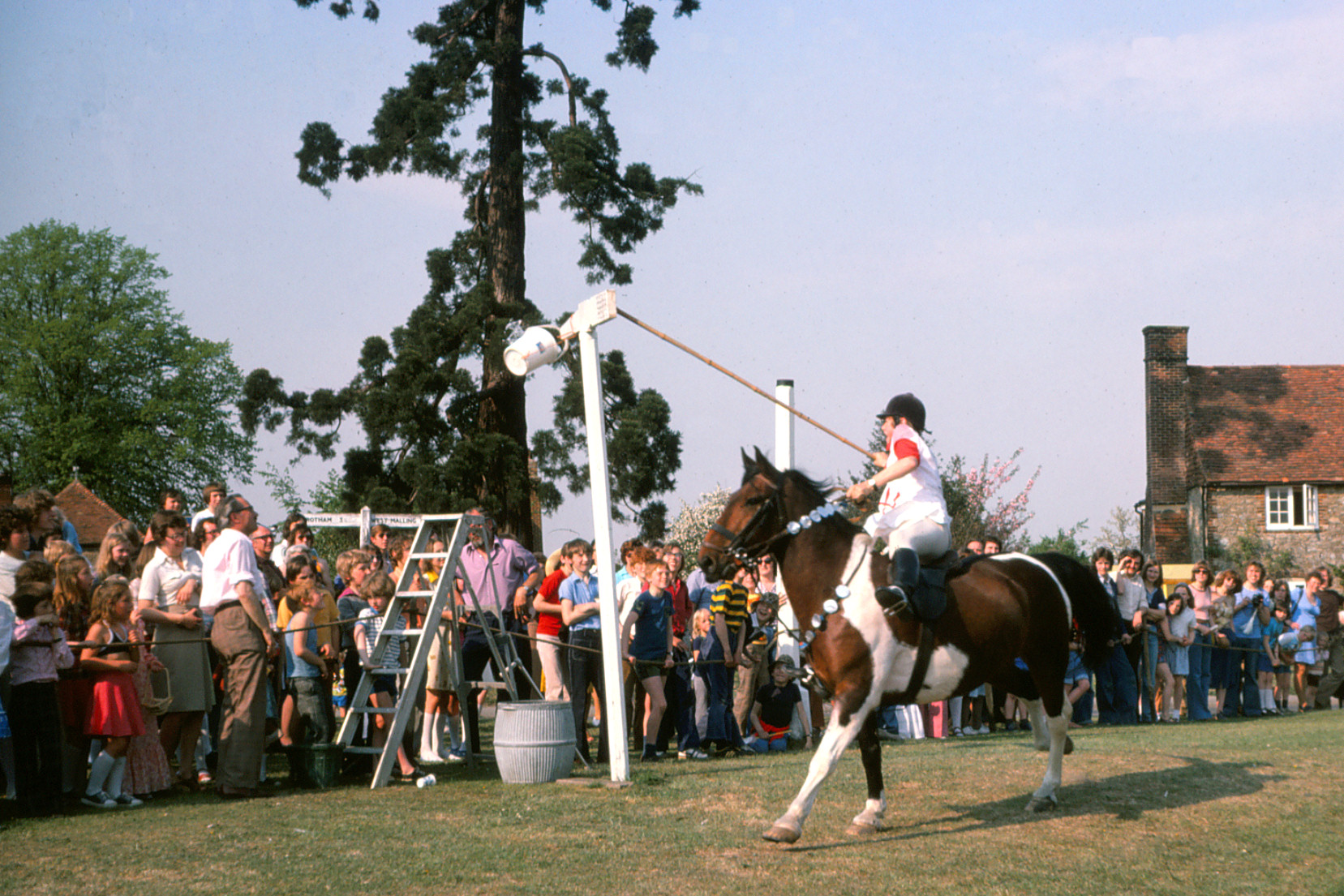
Tilting on horseback at a replica quintain on Offham Green, Kent 1976

The quintain (from Latin "fifth"), also known as pavo (Latin "peacock"), may have included a number of lance games, often used as a training aid for jousting, where the competitor would attempt to strike a stationary object with a lance. The common object was a shield or board on a pole (usually referred to as 'the quintain'), although a mannequin was sometimes used. It was not unknown for a seated armoured knight to act as the target.

== Etymology ==
The word quintain derives from Middle English quintaine, taken from Old French, derived from Latin quīntāna, "fifth", in reference to a street between the fifth and sixth maniples of a Roman camp, where warlike exercises took place.

== History ==
Quintain was a game open to all, popular with young men of all social classes. While the use of horses aided in training for the joust, the game could be played on foot, using a wooden horse or on boats (popular in 12th-century London).

As late as the 18th century running at the quintain survived in English rural districts. In one variation of the pastime the quintain was a tun filled with water, which, if the blow was a poor one, was emptied over the striker. A later form was a post with a cross-piece, from which was suspended a ring, which the horseman endeavoured to pierce with his lance while at full speed. This sport, called "tilting at the ring" or "running at the ring", was very popular in England and on the continent of Europe in the 17th century and is still practised as a feature of military and equestrian sport.

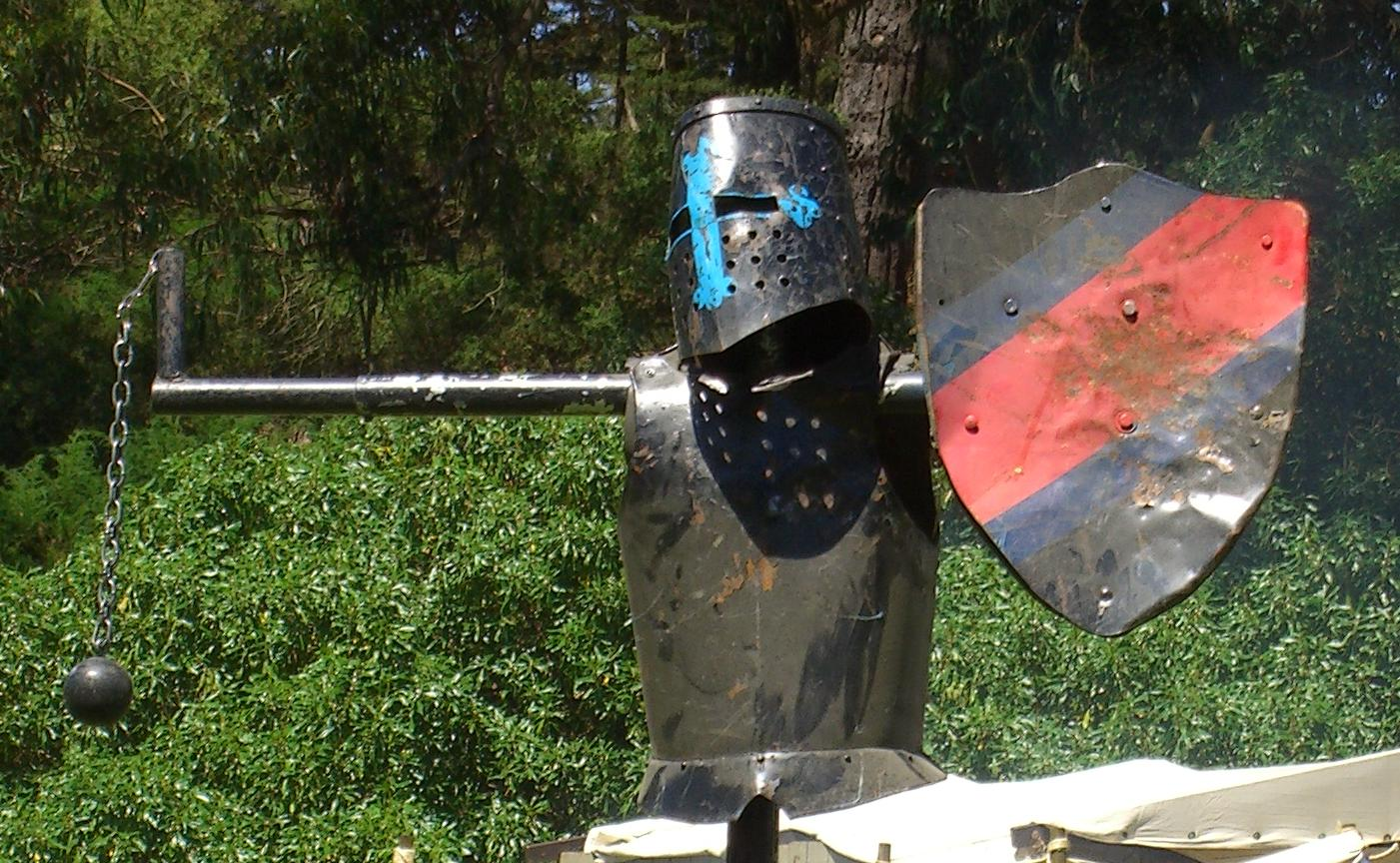
A modern take on the quintain: Golden Gate Renaissance fair, San Francisco, California (2008)

A form of quintain known as štehvanje is practiced by Slovenes in the Gail Valley (German: Gailtal) in Austrian Carinthia, and it was also introduced to villages in the Sava Valley north of Ljubljana in the 1930s.

== Offham Quintain ==
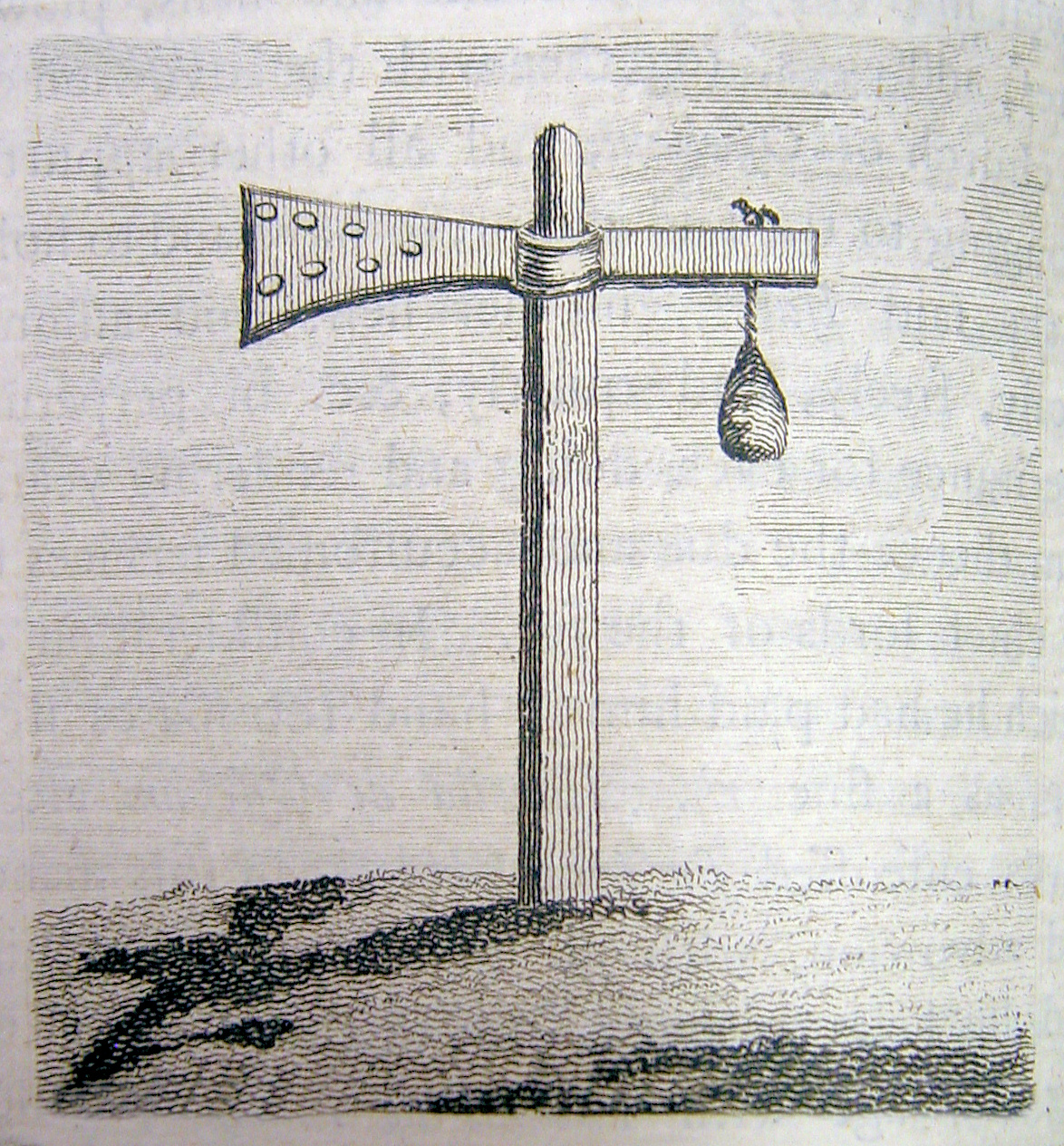
Illustration by Hasted of Quintain on Offham Green, Kent, 1798

The best known historic feature of the village of Offham in Kent is the Quintain, situated on the Green, a supposedly Roman invention which was popular in Elizabethan times as a means of testing the agility of horsemen.

Writing in 1782 in his History of Kent, Hasted says:

On Offham green there stands a Quintain, a thing now rarely to be met with, being a machine much used in former times by youth, as well to try their own activity as the swiftness of their horses in running at it. The cross piece of it is broad at one end, and pierced full of holes; and a bag of sand is hung at the other and swings round, on being moved with any blow. The pastime was for the youth on horseback to run at it as fast as possible, and hit the broad part in his career with much force. He that by chance hit it not at all, was treated with loud peals of derision; and he who did hit it, made the best use of his swiftness, least he should have a sound blow on his neck from the bag of sand, which instantly swang round from the other end of the quintain. The great design of this sport was, to try the agility both of horse and man, and to break the board, which whoever did, he was accounted chief of the day’s sport.

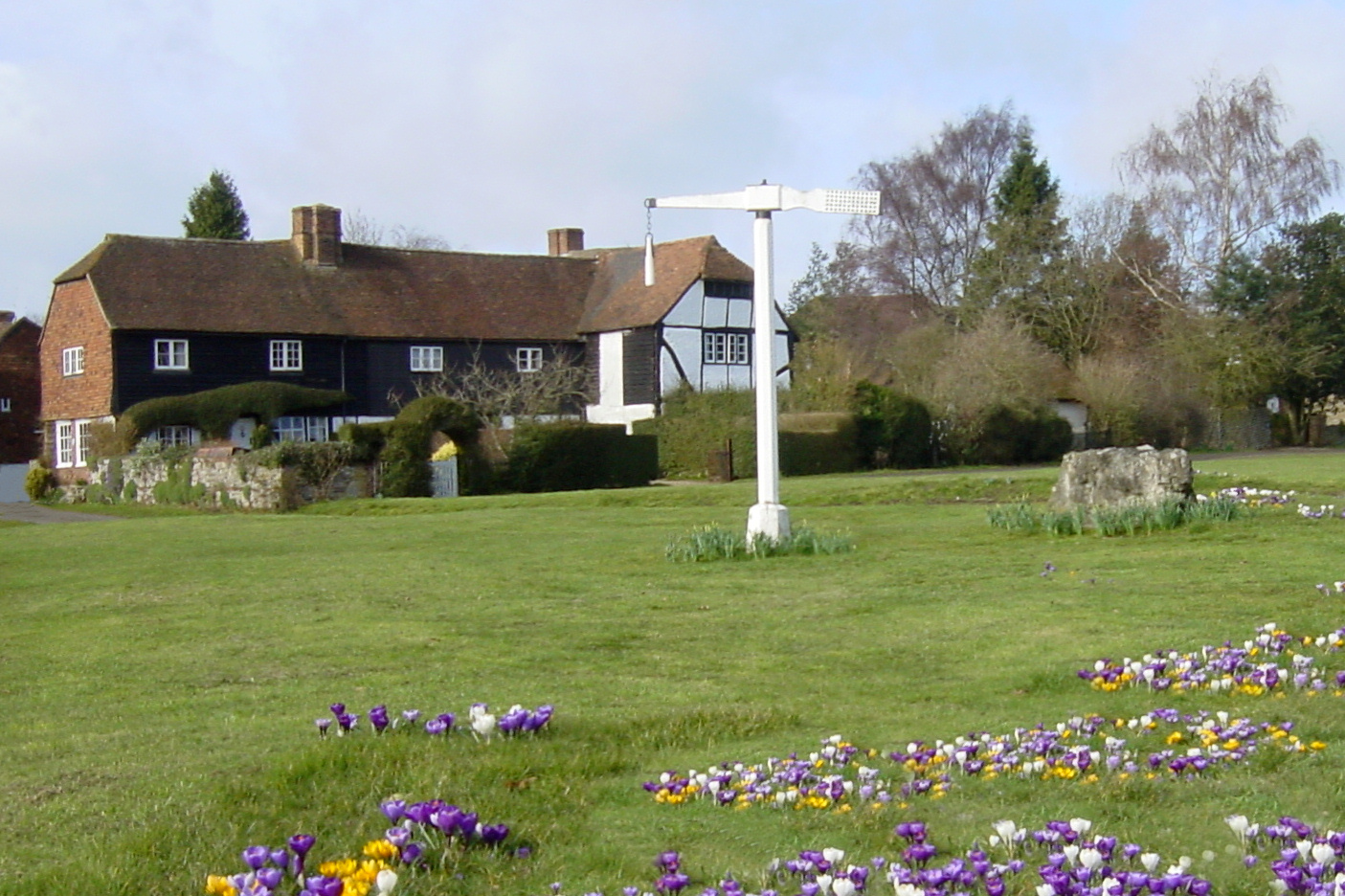
Quintain on Offham Green with crocuses 2006

During the Second World War, the quintain was removed to avoid serving as a landmark for an invading army, being restored to its present place on the Green with much ceremony in the presence of Lord Cornwallis, Lord Lieutenant of Kent, on 11 August 1945.

The stone and plaque explaining the history of the Quintain were unveiled on Saturday, 15 September 1951 in the presence of General Sir E. Thomas Humphreys (Chairman of the Parish Council), Mrs Emily Cosgrave and Colonel A. M. Wilkinson as part of the Festival of Britain celebrations. A replica quintain was used in the 1980s for tilting on horseback during the annual May Day celebrations, but this has been curtailed due to safety concerns. Responsibility for upkeep and maintenance of the Quintain now rests with the Parish Council.

The Offham Quintain is a Grade II listed monument and further details are given at Images of England.
