= Stožice (Ljubljana) =

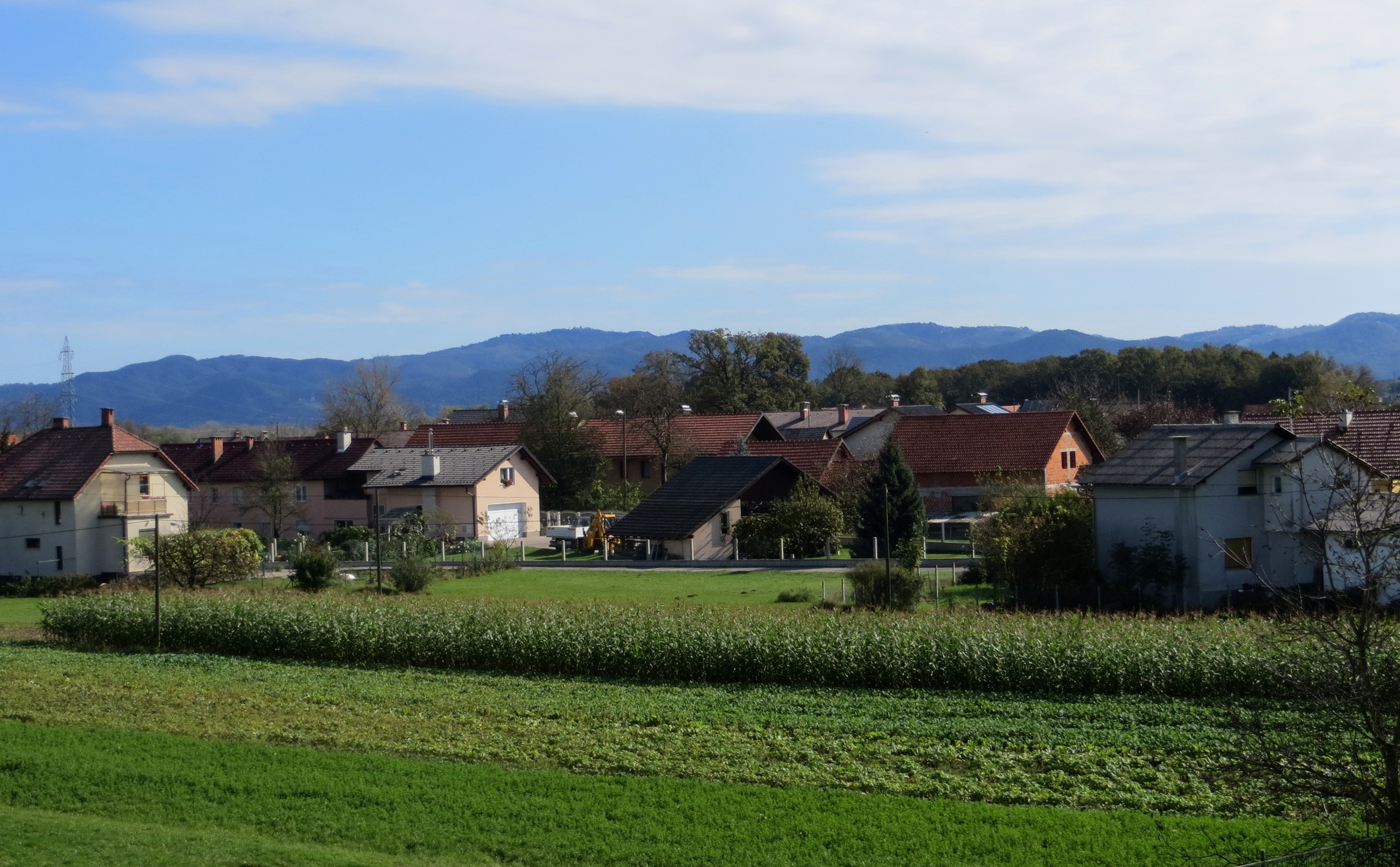

- Location in Slovenia
- Coordinates: 46°5′1.17″N 14°31′4.79″E
- Country: Slovenia
- Traditional region: Upper Carniola
- Statistical region: Central Slovenia
- Municipality: Ljubljana
- Elevation: 302 m (991 ft)

Stožice (pronounced [ˈstɔːʒitsɛ] or [ˈstoːʒitsɛ]; German: Stoschze) is a formerly independent settlement in the northern part of the capital Ljubljana in central Slovenia. It is part of the traditional region of Upper Carniola and is now included with the rest of the municipality in the Central Slovenia Statistical Region.

== Geography ==
Stožice lies between the former settlements of Ježica and Tomačevo, the hamlet of Brinje, and the historical territory of the City of Ljubljana along both sides of the former main road to Domžale (Dunajska cesta 'Vienna Street'). Stožice developed from a core settlement of farms east of the road on a terrace above the Sava River. The soil is sandy and fertile.

== Name ==
The name Stožice is derived from the Slovene common noun stog 'stack of hay', referring to local agricultural practices. In the past the German name of the village was Stoschze.

== History ==
The walls of a square Roman structure were discovered in the north part of the Stožice cemetery in 1880. Associated finds included a coin from the 4th century. Roman tiles and graves have also been found at the Urbanček farm in Stožice. Before the Second World War, a textile factory and a vinegar and yeast factory operated in the village. Important economic activities also included sales of foodstuffs, especially milk and eggs, to Ljubljana. After the war, there was extensive private construction in the Stožice. The southern part of Stožice (79 houses with a population of 628) was annexed by Ljubljana in 1935. The remainder of Stožice was annexed by the City of Ljubljana in 1974, ending its existence as an independent settlement.

== Church ==
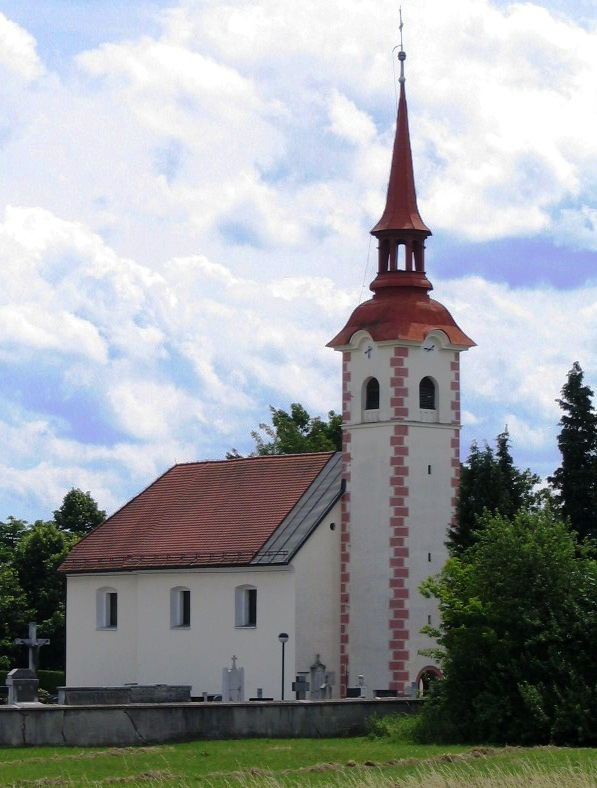
Saint George's Church

The church in Stožice is dedicated to Saint George. It is late Gothic or even earlier in style and was first mentioned in written sources in 1526. It has been remodeled several times. The furnishings of the church are primarily the work of Andrej Rovšek and date from the early 20th century. The church cemetery was established in 1797, when it was transferred from the parish church in Ježica. The cemetery contains a memorial to 104 victims of the Second World War.

== Notable people ==
Notable people that were born or lived in Stožice include:

- Alojzij Merhar (a.k.a. Silvin Sardenko) (1876–1942), poet, writer, playwright, and editor
- Franc Pavlovec (1897–1959), painter
- France Presetnik (1913–1997), actor
- Franci Presetnik (1916–1974), actor
