= List of female members of the European Parliament for Slovenia =

This is a list of women who are or have been members of the European Parliament for Slovenia.

== List ==
Image	Name	National party	EP group	Elected	Year left	Ref.
	Mojca Drčar Murko	Liberal Democracy of Slovenia	ALDE	2004	2009	
	Romana Jordan Cizelj	Slovenian Democratic Party	EPP	2004	2014	
	Ljudmila Novak	New Slovenia	EPP	2004	2009	
	Ljudmila Novak	New Slovenia	EPP	2019	2024	
	Tanja Fajon	Social Democrats	S&D	2009	2022 (Note: Resigned to become the Minister of Foreign and European Affairs of Slovenia.)	
	Zofija Mazej Kukovič	Slovenian Democratic Party	EPP	2011 (Note: Won the seat after Slovenia gained one more MEP because of the Treaty of Lisbon.)	2014	
	Romana Tomc	Slovenian Democratic Party	EPP	2014	Incumbent	
	Patricija Šulin	Slovenian Democratic Party	EPP	2014	2019	
	Irena Joveva	List of Marjan Šarec (until 2022)	RE	2019	Incumbent	
	Irena Joveva	Freedom Movement (from 2022)	RE	2019	Incumbent	
	Zala Tomašič	Slovenian Democratic Party	EPP	2024	Incumbent	

== See also ==
- Women in Slovenia
- Slovenia (European Parliament constituency)
