= List of members of the European Parliament for Slovenia, 2019–2024 =

This is a list of the 8 members of the European Parliament for Slovenia in the 2019 to 2024 session.

These MEPs were elected at the 2019 European Parliament election in Slovenia.

== List ==
On the Slovenian Democratic Party-Slovenian People's Party list: (EPP Group)

1. Milan Zver
2. Romana Tomc
3. Franc Bogovič

On the Social Democrats list: (S&D)

1. Tanja Fajon (2019—2022)
2. Milan Brglez
3. Matjaž Nemec (since 2022)

On the List of Marjan Šarec list: (Renew)

1. Irena Joveva
2. Klemen Grošelj

On the New Slovenia list: (EPP Group)

1. Ljudmila Novak

== See also ==
- List of members of the European Parliament, 2019–2024
- 2019 European Parliament election
- Politics of Slovenia
