= List of members of the European Parliament for Slovenia, 2024–2029 =

This is a list of the 9 members of the European Parliament for Slovenia in the 2024 to 2029 session. The members were elected in the 2024 European Parliament election in Slovenia.

== List ==
Name	National party	EP Group	Preference votes
Romana Tomc	Slovenian Democratic Party (SDS)	EPP	73,974
Zala Tomašič	Slovenian Democratic Party (SDS)	EPP	26,934
Milan Zver	Slovenian Democratic Party (SDS)	EPP	15,963
Branko Grims	Slovenian Democratic Party (SDS)	EPP	12,757
Irena Joveva	Freedom Movement (GS)	RE	71,205
Marjan Šarec	Freedom Movement (GS)	RE	14,596
Vladimir Prebilič	Vesna – Green Party	Greens/EFA	52,541
Matjaž Nemec	Social Democrats (SD)	S&D	25,784
Matej Tonin	New Slovenia (NSi)	EPP	16,799

Source: "ELECTION RESULTS". State Election Commission.
