= Slovenia (European Parliament constituency) =

Constituency of the European Parliament

- European Parliament constituency
- Location among the current constituencies
- Member state: Slovenia
- Created: 2004
- MEPs: 7 (2004–2011); 8 (2011–2024); 9 (2024–present)

Slovenia is a European Parliament constituency for elections in the European Union covering the member state of Slovenia. It is currently represented by nine Members of the European Parliament.

== Members of the European Parliament ==
Election	MEP Party	MEP Party	MEP Party	MEP Party	MEP Party	MEP Party	MEP Party	MEP Party	MEP Party
2004	Borut Pahor; SD	Mihael Brejc; SDS	Lojze Peterle; N.Si	Mojca Drčar Murko; LDS	Romana Cizelj; SDS	Jelko Kacin; LDS	Ljudmila Novak; N.Si		
2009	Tanja Fajon; SD	Zofija Mazej Kukovič; SDS	Lojze Peterle; N.Si	Zoran Thaler; SD	Romana Cizelj; SDS	Jelko Kacin; LDS	Ivo Vajgl; Zares, DeSUS	Milan Zver; SDS	
2014	Tanja Fajon; SD	Romana Tomc; SDS	Lojze Peterle; N.Si	Franc Bogovič; SLS	Patricija Šulin; SDS	Igor Šoltes; Verjamem	Ivo Vajgl; Zares, DeSUS	Milan Zver; SDS	
2019	Tanja Fajon; SD	Romana Tomc; SDS	Ljudmila Novak; N.Si	Franc Bogovič; SLS	Milan Brglez; SD	Irena Joveva; LMŠ (until 2022) / GS (from 2022)	Klemen Grošelj; LMŠ	Milan Zver; SDS	
2024	Matjaž Nemec; SD	Romana Tomc; SDS	Matej Tonin; N.Si	Zala Tomašič; SDS	Branko Grims; SDS	Irena Joveva; LMŠ (until 2022) / GS (from 2022)	Marjan Šarec; GS	Milan Zver; SDS	Vladimir Prebilič; Vesna

== Elections ==
=== 2004 ===
The 2004 European election was the sixth election to the European Parliament. As Slovenia had only joined the European Union earlier that month, it was the first European election held in that state. The election took place on 13 June 2004. The biggest surprise was the victory of the New Slovenia party over the Liberal Democracy of Slovenia and the defeat of the Slovene People's Party, which did not win a seat. The parties on the right of centre that form the opposition in the Slovenian national parliament won this election.

=== 2009 ===
The 2009 European election was the seventh election to the European Parliament and the second for Slovenia. The number of seats was increased to eight.

=== 2014 ===
The 2014 European election was the eighth election to the European Parliament and the third for Slovenia.

=== 2019 ===
The 2019 European election was the ninth election to the European Parliament and the fourth for Slovenia.

=== 2024 ===
The 2024 European election was the tenth election to the European Parliament and the fifth for Slovenia. The number of seats was increased to nine.
