= 2024 European Parliament election in Slovenia =

- 9 June 2024

All 9 Slovenian seats to the European Parliament
- Turnout: 41.18% (▲12.29%)
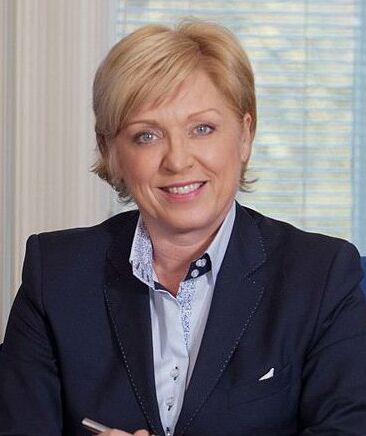

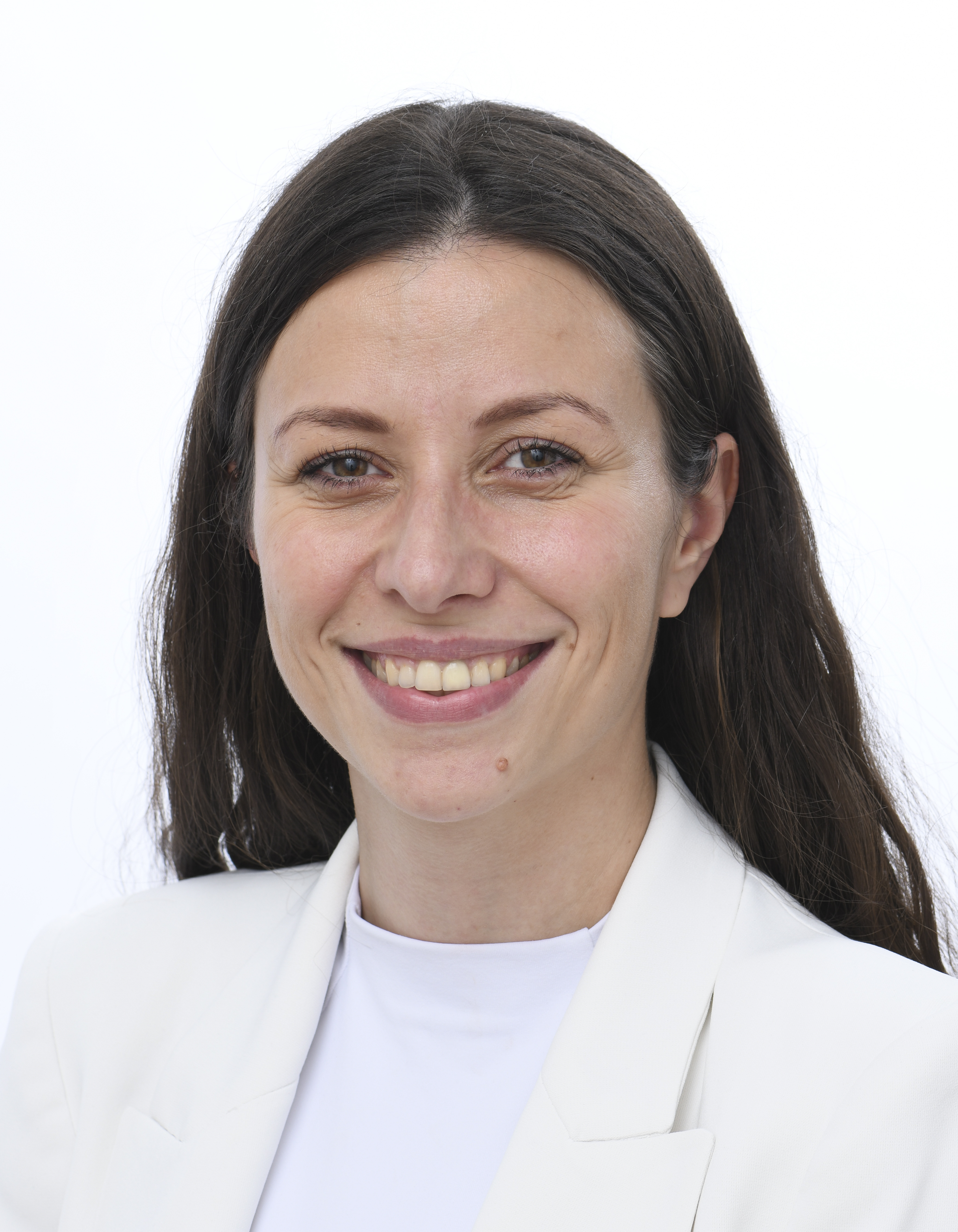

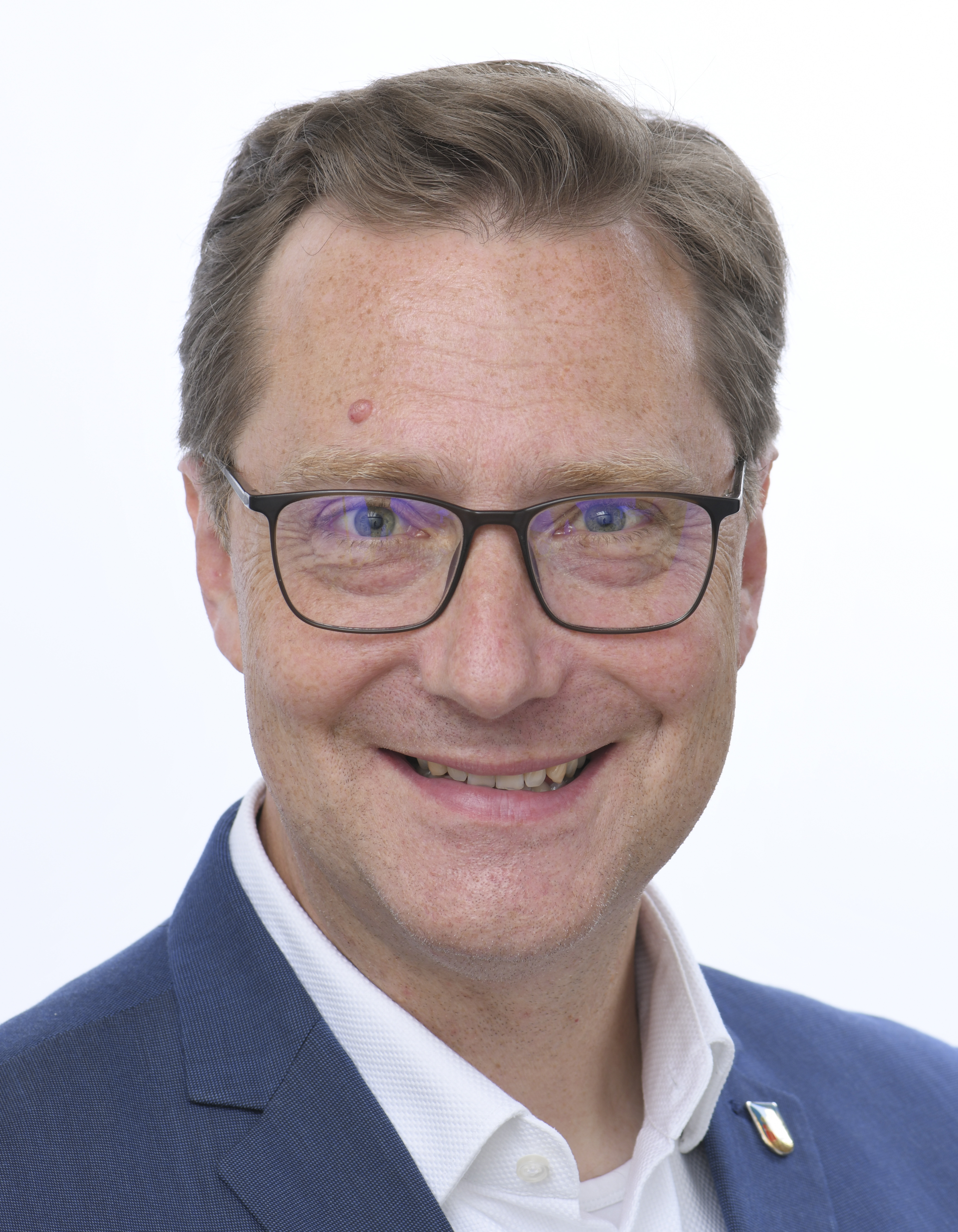

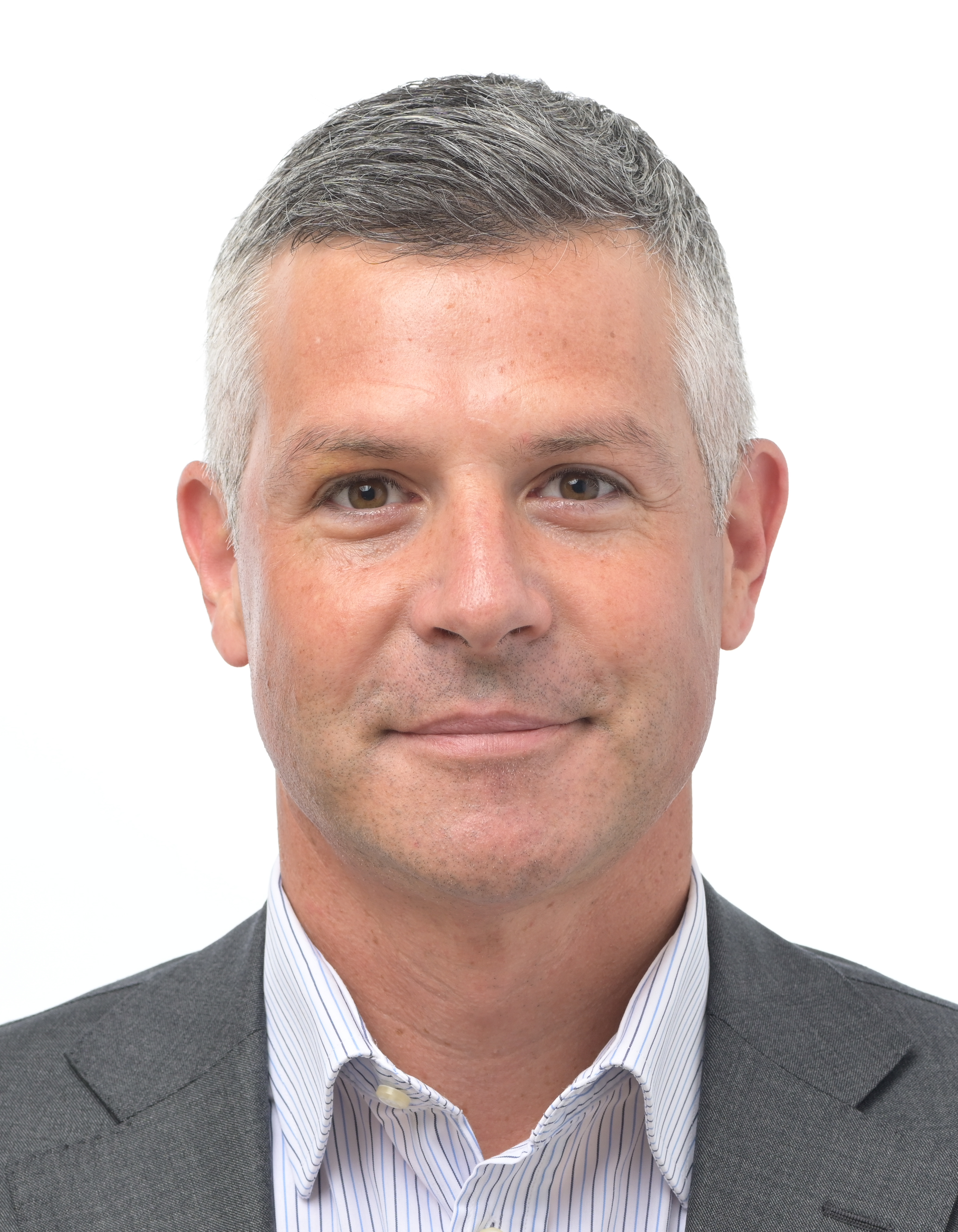

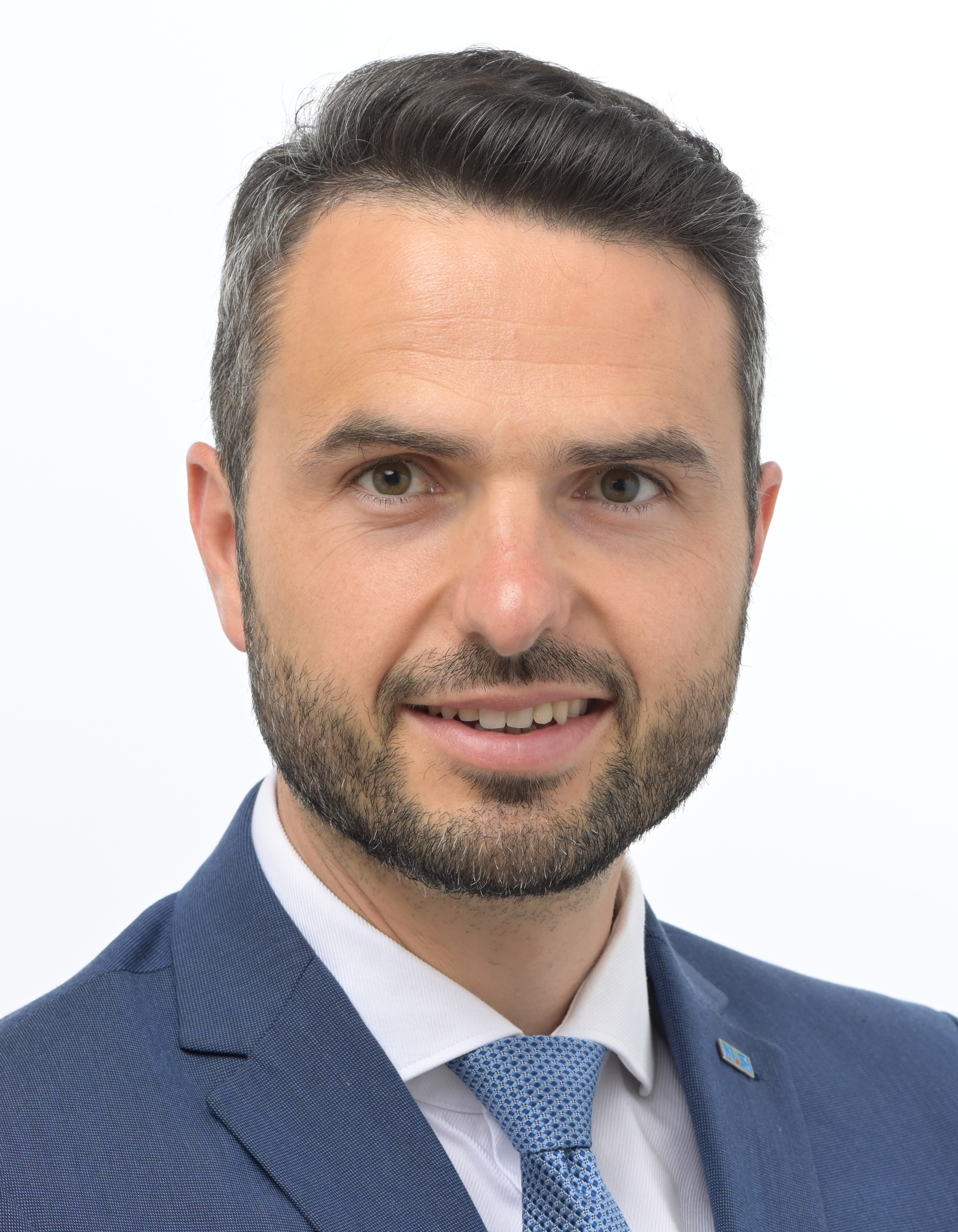
	First party	Second party	Third party
Leader	Romana Tomc	Irena Joveva	Vladimir Prebilič
Party	SDS	Svoboda	Vesna
Alliance	EPP	RE	G/EFA
Last election	2 seats, 26.25% (Note: Percentage for joint 2019 SDS+SLS list. Seats for SDS only.)	New (Note: In 2022, the List of Marjan Šarec, which received 15.44% of the votes and 2 seats, and the Party of Alenka Bratušek, which received 4.02% of the votes and 0 seats, merged into the party.)	New
Seats won	4	2	1
Seat change	▲2	New	New
Popular vote	206,368	149,200	71,023
Percentage	30.61%	22.13%	10.54%
Swing	▲4.36 pp	New	New
	Fourth party	Fifth party
Leader	Matjaž Nemec	Matej Tonin
Party	SD	NSi
Alliance	S&D	EPP
Last election	2 seats, 18.66%	1 seat, 11.12%
Seats won	1	1
Seat change	▼1	Steady
Popular vote	52,390	51,182
Percentage	7.77%	7.59%
Swing	▼10.89 pp	▼3.53 pp
SDS
20-30%
30-40%
40-50%
Svoboda
30-40%
40-50%
Vesna
40-50%

The 2024 European Parliament election in Slovenia was held on 9 June 2024 as part of the 2024 European Parliament election. This was the fifth European Parliament election held in Slovenia, and the first to take place after Brexit.

== Electoral system ==
Compared to last election, Slovenia is entitled to one more MEP assigned in 2023 after a pre-election assessment of the Parliament composition based on the most recent population figures. The 9 members are elected through semi-open list proportional representation in a single nationwide constituency with seats allocated through D'Hondt method and no electoral threshold.

Both Slovenian and other non-Slovenian EU citizens residing in the country are entitled to vote in the European elections in Slovenia. No registration is needed for Slovenian citizens, while other EU citizens residing in Slovenia are required to register with the Ministry of Interior no later than 15 days before the election day. Slovenian citizens residing abroad can choose to vote by post, in the closest diplomatic or consular representation of Slovenia, or in a special polling station in Slovenia. In addition, those eligible to vote must turn 18 years old by election day at the latest.

== Outgoing delegation ==
The table shows the detailed composition of the Slovenian seats at the European Parliament as of 27 March 2024.

EP Group	Seats	Party	Seats	MEPs
European People's Party	4 / 8	Slovenian Democratic Party	2	Romana Tomc; Milan Zver
European People's Party	4 / 8	Slovenian People's Party	1	Franc Bogovič
European People's Party	4 / 8	New Slovenia – Christian Democrats	1	Ljudmila Novak
Progressive Alliance of Socialists and Democrats	2 / 8	Social Democrats	2	Milan Brglez; Matjaž Nemec
Renew Europe	2 / 8	Freedom Movement	1	Irena Joveva
Renew Europe	2 / 8	Greens of Slovenia	1	Klemen Grošelj
Total			8	
Source: European Parliament

== Running parties ==
Party		European Party	Group	2019 result	Top candidate
SDS	Slovenian Democratic Party	EPP	EPP	26.3	Romana Tomc
SLS	Slovenian People's Party	EPP	EPP	26.3	Peter Gregorčič
SD	Social Democrats	PES	S&D	18.7	Matjaž Nemec
NSi	New Slovenia – Christian Democrats	EPP	EPP	11.1	Matej Tonin
Levica	The Left	PEL	−	6.4	Nataša Sukič
DeSUS + DD	Democratic Party of Pensioners of Slovenia & Good State	EDP	−	5.7	Uroš Lipušček
ZS	Greens of Slovenia	−	RE	2.2	Klemen Grošelj
GS	Freedom Movement	−	RE	−	Irena Joveva
Vesna	Vesna – Green Party	EGP	−	−	Vladimir Prebilič
Resni.ca	Resni.ca	−	−	−	Zoran Stevanović
NOT	None of the Above	−	−	−	Violeta Tomić

== Opinion polling ==
Fieldwork date	Polling firm	Publisher(s)	Sample size	SDS EPP	SLS (Gregorčič) EPP	ZS NI	SD S&D	NSi EPP	Levica Left	DeSUS EDP	DD NI	GS Renew	Resni.ca NI	PPS G/EFA	Vesna (Prebilič) G/EFA	NOT NI	Logar NI	Rupar NI	Others	None	Und.	Abst.	Lead	Source
3–6 Jun 2024	Ninamedia	Dnevnik	629	25.1	6.4	2.1	10.3	6.8	4.8	4.4		19.5	5.4	–	13.1	2.1	–	–	–	–	–	–	5.6	
3–5 Jun 2024	Mediana	Delo	734	20.5; 3	6.0; 0	1.5; 0	6.5; 1	7.8; 1	4.4; 0	1.9; 0		18.4; 3	3.9; 0	–	7.7; 1	1.5; 0	–	–	19.9				2.1	
21–24 May 2024	Mediana	POPTV	713	17.9; 4	3.0; 0	2.6; 0	9.1; 1	6.0; 1	4.1; 0	1.4; 0		12.8; 2	5.5; 0	–	8.1; 1	0.9; 0	–	–	0.1; 0	4.0	14.7	6.2	5.1	
13–16 May 2024	Ninamedia	Dnevnik	1,000	27.4; 3	4.4; 0	3.6; 0	11.5; 1	7.9; 1	5.7; 0	2.8; 0		17.6; 2	3.2; 0	–	14.0; 1	1.7; 0	–	–	–	–	–	–	9.8	
23–25 Apr 2024	Mediana	POPTV	723	21.7	3.3	–	5.7	7.1	3.0	2.6		15.5	3.1	2.8	7.1	0.9	–	–	0.2	4.3	14.7	4.2	6.2	
22–25 Apr 2024	Parsifal	Nova24TV	863	24.5	2.8	–	6.8	6.3	4.3	1.7		12.5	4.5	2.2	2.7	–	–	–	0.1	5.7	18.7	7.2	12.0	
5–7 Mar 2024	Mediana	Delo	723	20.7	2.4	–	6.4	6.2	4.5	–	–	13.0	4.1	3.3	3.3	–	–	2.7	1.7	6.4	18.6	4.3	7.7	
4–7 Dec 2023	Ninamedia	–	700	14.6	3.7	–	11.4	6.3	4.0	–	–	11.6	–	–	8.3	–	12.4	0.9	–	–	19.7	7.1	2.2	
24 April 2022	2022 parliamentary election	–	–	23.48	3.41		6.69	6.86	4.46	0.66	1.70	40.23 (Note: Compared with the 2022 results of GS + LMŠ and SAB which have both merged with GS)	2.86	1.63	1.35	—N/a	—N/a	—N/a	6.13	(29.04)			16.75	
26 May 2019	2019 election	–	–	26.25		2.22	18.66	11.12	6.43	5.67	0.53	19.46 (Note: Compared with the 2019 results of LMŠ and SAB which have both merged with GS)	—N/a	—N/a	—N/a	—N/a	—N/a	—N/a	9.67	(71.11)			6.79	

== Results ==
Party	Votes	%	Seats	+/–
Slovenian Democratic Party	206,368	30.61	4	+2
Freedom Movement	149,200	22.13	2	New
Vesna – Green Party	71,023	10.54	1	New
Social Democrats	52,390	7.77	1	–1
New Slovenia – Christian Democrats	51,182	7.59	1	0
Slovenian People's Party	48,637	7.21	0	–1
The Left	32,436	4.81	0	0
Resni.ca	26,767	3.97	0	New
Democratic Party of Pensioners − Good State	14,980	2.22	0	0
Greens of Slovenia	10,865	1.61	0	0
None of the Above	10,263	1.52	0	New
Total	674,111	100.00	9	+1
Valid votes	674,111	95.58		
Invalid/blank votes	31,182	4.42		
Total votes	705,293	100.00		
Registered voters/turnout	1,689,586	41.74		

=== European groups ===
Party	Seats	+/–
European People's Party Group	5	+1
Renew Europe	2	0
Greens–European Free Alliance	1	+1
Progressive Alliance of Socialists and Democrats	1	-1
Total	9	+1
