= List of members of the European Parliament for Slovenia, 2004–2009 =

This is the list of the 7 members of the European Parliament for Slovenia in the 2004 to 2009 session.

== List ==
Name	National party	EP Group
Mihael Brejc	Democratic Party	EPP–ED
Mojca Drčar Murko	Liberal Democracy	ALDE
Romana Cizelj	Democratic Party	EPP–ED
Jelko Kacin	Liberal Democracy	ALDE
Ljudmila Novak	New Slovenia	EPP–ED
Borut Pahor	Social Democrats	PES
Alojz Peterle	New Slovenia	EPP–ED

=== Party representation ===
National party	EP Group	Seats	±
New Slovenia	EPP–ED	2 / 7	
Liberal Democracy – Democratic Party of Pensioners	ALDE	2 / 7	
Democratic Party	EPP–ED	2 / 7	
Social Democrats	PES	1 / 7	
