= 2019 European Parliament election in Slovenia =

← 2014	26 May 2019	2024 →

All 8 Slovenian seats to the European Parliament
- Turnout: 28.89%
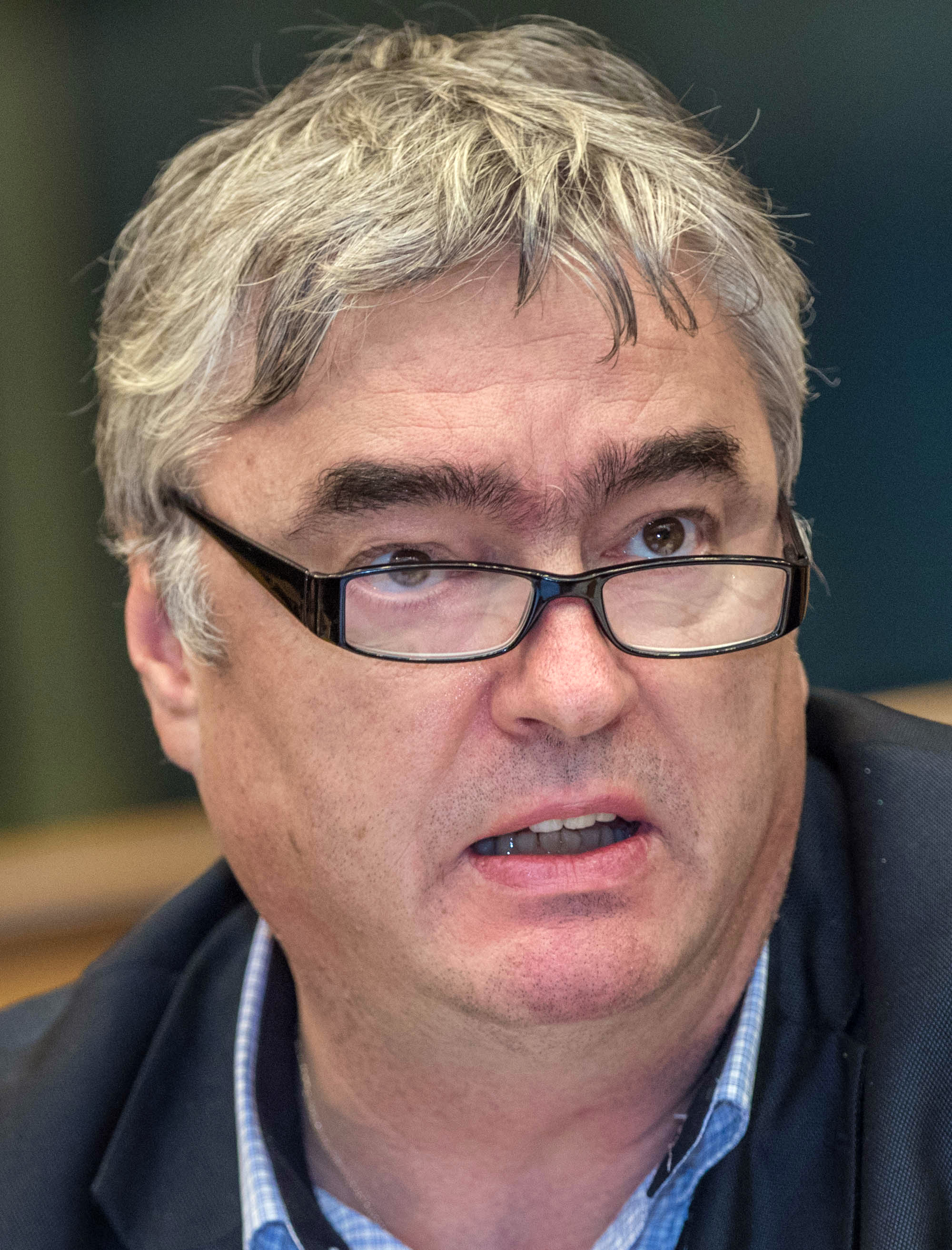

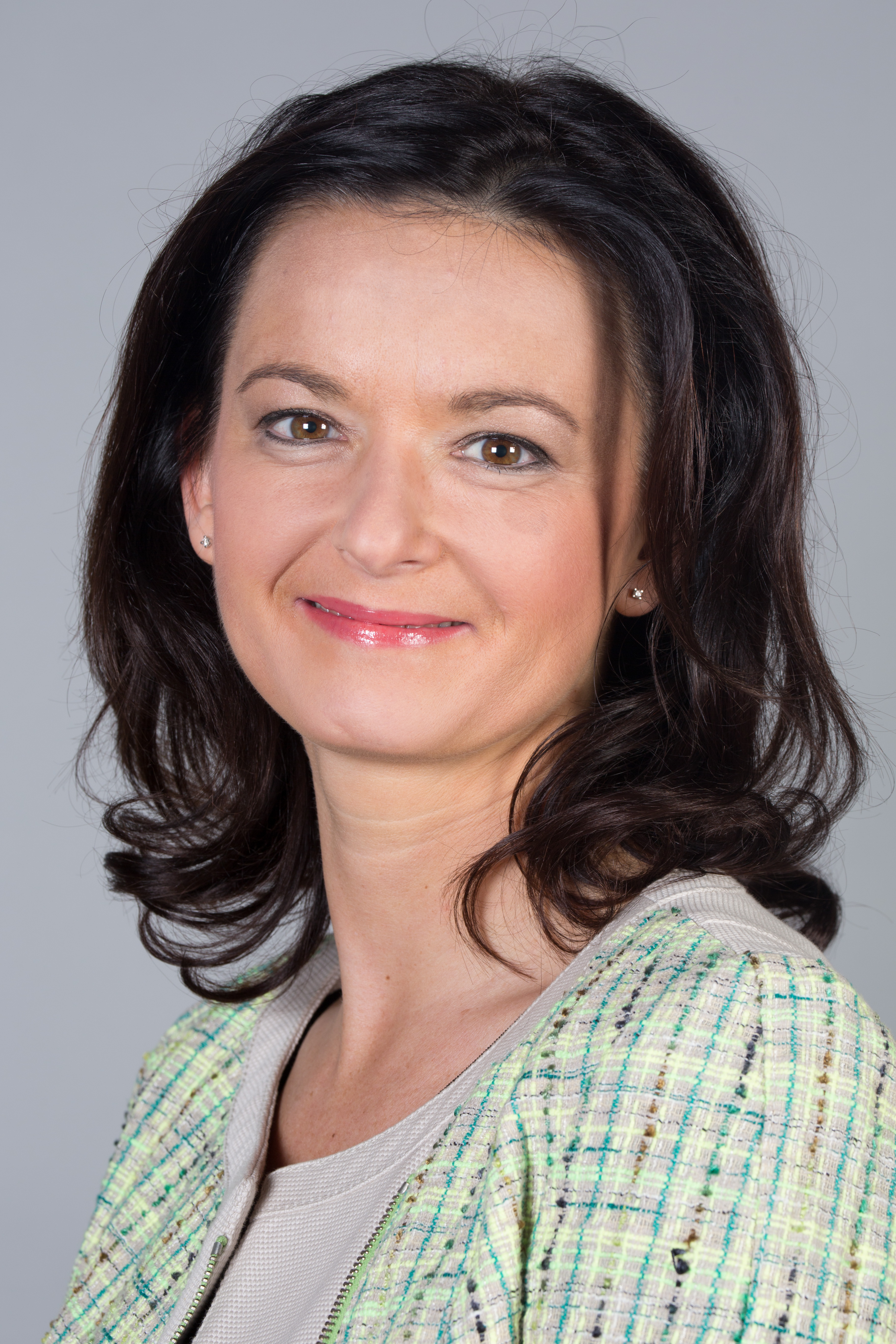

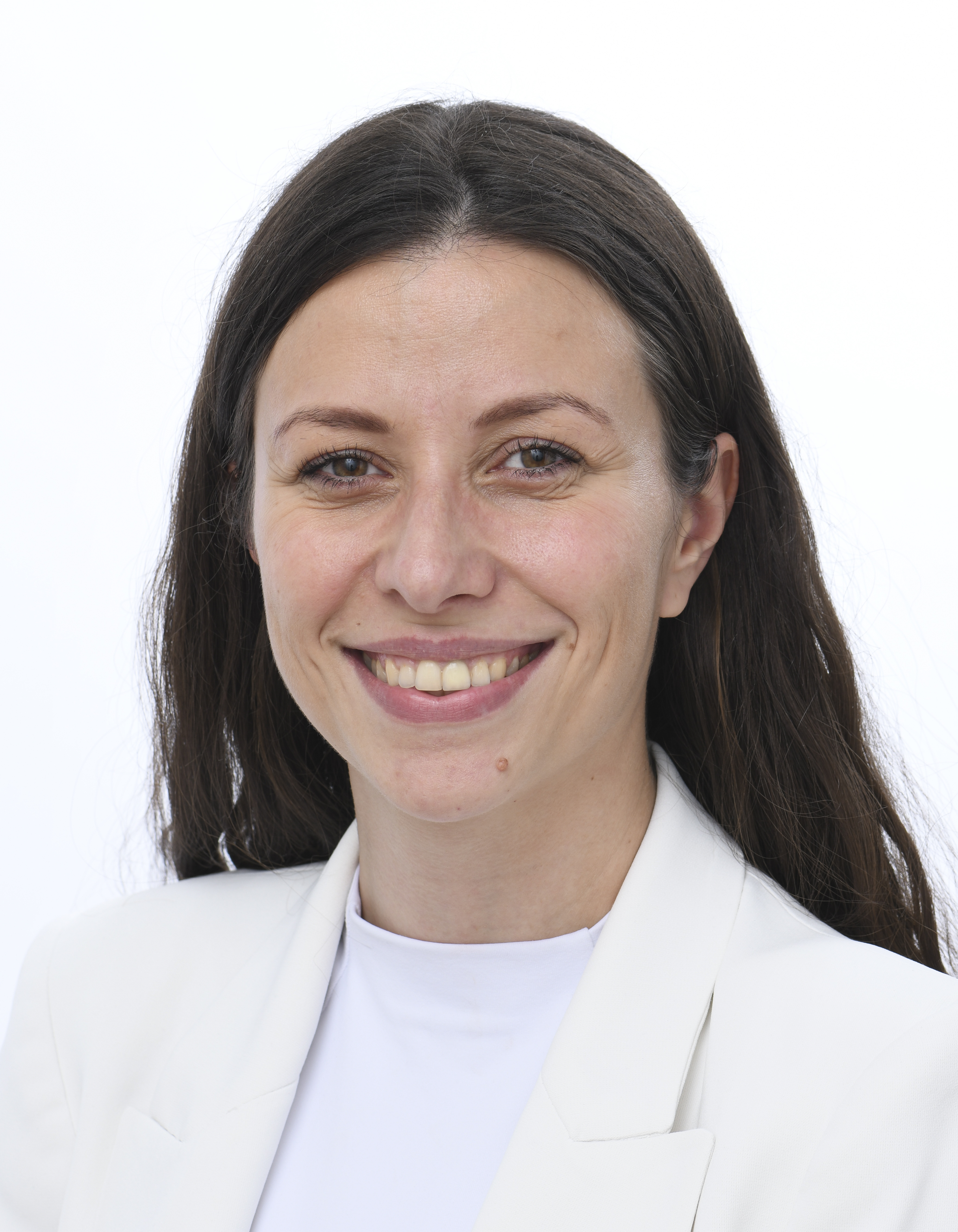

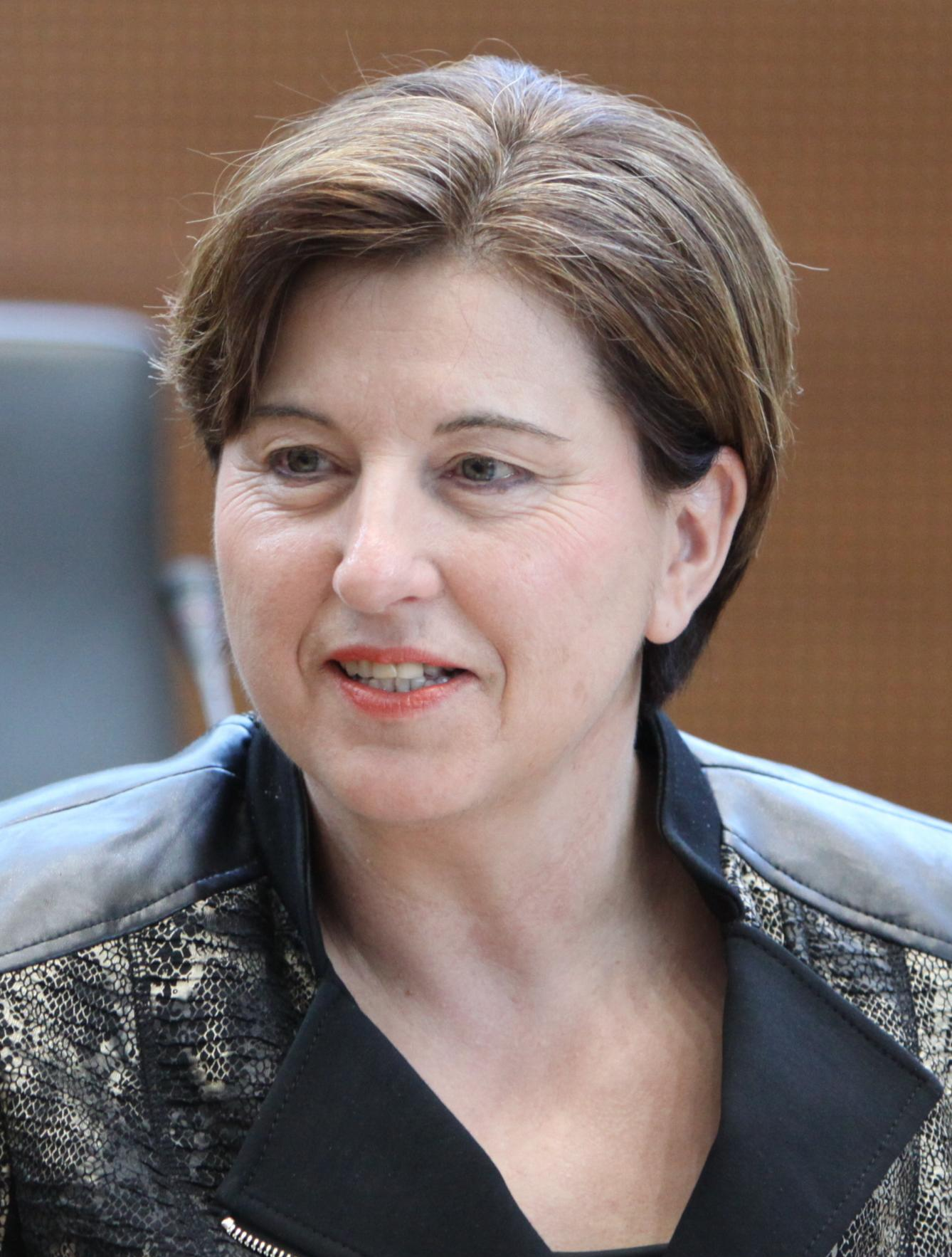
	First party	Second party
Leader	Milan Zver	Tanja Fajon
Party	SDS + SLS	SD
Alliance	EPP	PES
Last election	3 (+1) seats, 41.4% (Note: Includes results for SDS (3 seats, 24.8%) and the SLS + NSi alliance (2 seats, 16.6%).)	1 seat, 8.1%
Seats won	2 (+1)	2
Seat change	▼1	▲1
Popular vote	126,534	89,936
Percentage	26.25%	18.66%
Swing	N/A	▲9.5%
	Third party	Fourth party
Leader	Irena Joveva	Ljudmila Novak
Party	LMŠ	NSi
Alliance	ALDE	EPP
Last election	–	16.6% (Note: Results for the SLS + NSi alliance (2 seats, 16.6%).)
Seats won	2	1
Seat change	New	0
Popular vote	74,431	53,621
Percentage	15.44%	11.12%
Swing	New	N/A

2019 European Parliament elections were held in Slovenia on 26 May 2019.

== Candidates ==
Political Party	Candidate and Leader	Candidate	Candidate	Candidate	Candidate	Candidate	Candidate	Candidate
List of Marjan Šarec (LMŠ - ALDE)	Irena Joveva	Klemen Grošelj	Edis Rujović	Katja Domij	Jasna Ružicki	Justina Erčulj	Rudi Spruk	Luka Kočevar
Democratic Party of Pensioners of Slovenia (DeSUS - EDP)	Igor Šoltes	Damjan Stanonik	Tereza Novak	Zdenka Gajzer	Vitomir Mavrič	Maja Sušec	Peter Boršič	Vesna Dragan
Good State (DD)	Peter Golob	Natalija Tripković	Smiljan Mekicar	Mateja Čadež	Igor Gobec	Simona Leskovec	Tilen Majnardi	Urška Makovec
New Slovenia (NSi - EPP)	Ljudmila Novak	Jožef Horvat	Lojze Peterle	Iva Dimic	Mojca Erjavec	Katja Berk Bevc	Franci Demšar	Žiga Turk
Patriotic League (DOM)	Bernard Brščič	Lucija Šikovec Ušaj	Norma Marija Korošec	Marko Oblak				
Modern Centre Party (SMC - ALDE)	Gregor Perič	Helena Cvikl	Janja Sluga	Miha Rebolj	Branislav Rajić	Bojana Cvahte	Vesna Ugrinovski	Aleš Prijon
Party of Alenka Bratušek (SAB - ALDE)	Angelika Mlinar	Jernej Pavlič	Olga Belec	Andrej Rajh	Đorđe Berak	Mateja Zupan	Andrej Šušmelj	Nina Mauhler
Slovene National Party (SNS)	Zmago Jelinčič Plemeniti	Tomaž Krajnc	Jernej Ahčin	Alenka Jelenovič	Marija Župevc	Andrej Dočinski	Katarina Žunko	Ivana Bendra
Slovenian Democratic Party (SDS - EPP) + Slovenian People's Party (SLS - EPP)	Milan Zver	Romana Tomc	Patricija Šulin	Franc Bogovič	Franc Kangler	Alenka Forte	Davorin Kopše	Alja Domjan
Social Democrats (SD - PES)	Tanja Fajon	Matjaž Nemec	Dominika Švarc Pipan	Milan Brglez	Neva Grašič	Ljubica Jelušič	Franc Hočevar	Aleksander Jevšek
The Left (Levica - PEL)	Violeta Tomič	Sašo Slaček Brlek	Ana Štromajer	Danijel Rebolj	Urška Lipovž	Lovro Centrih	Alma Rekić	Luka Mesec
Let's Connect (Povežimo se - Greens)	Urša Zgojznik	Boštjan Tavčar	Josip Rotar	Marjana Škalič Žužek	Domen Savič	Karel Šrot	Nermina Simončič	Petra Greiner

== Opinion polls ==
Poll results are listed in the table below in reverse chronological order, showing the most recent first. The highest percentage figure in each polling survey is displayed in bold, and the background shaded in the leading party's colour. The projected numbers of MP's per party, if available, are listed in brackets. In the instance that there is a tie, then no figure is shaded. The lead column on the right shows the percentage-point difference between the two parties with the highest figures. Poll results use the date the survey's fieldwork was done, as opposed to the date of publication. However, if such date is unknown, the date of publication will be given instead.

Date	Polling firm/Publisher(s)	Sample size	SDS+SLS EPP	SDS EPP	LMŠ ALDE	SD PES	SMC ALDE	SAB ALDE	The Left PEL	NSi EPP	DeSUS EDP	SNS	SLS EPP	Oth.	None	Und.	Not vote	Lead
8. - 15. May 2019	Delo	–	**12.2%**	–	10.7%	11.1%	1.2%	2.6%	6.4%	7.3%	3.5%	8.1%	–	5.5%	–	–	–	1.1%
16. - 24. April 2019	POP TV	–	**12.3%**	–	10.1%	12.2%	2.4%	3.1%	5.9%	6.4%	3.3%	7.2%	–	4.5%	2.6%	18.8%	7.0%	0.1%
1. - 11. Apr 2019	Dnevnik	–	15.7%	–	**16.5%**	**16.5%**	<1.0%	4.2%	7.0%	8.3%	8.2%	<1.0	–	–	–	14.8%	–	Tie
1. - 11. Apr 2019	Delo	–	**16.8%**	–	9.7%	11.5%	1.8%	2.7%	8.3%	6.5%	4.6%	6.5%	–	–	–	30.0%	–	5.3%
28 March	**SDS and SLS announce joint bid**																	
18. Feb 2019	European Parliament/MMC RTVSLO	–	–	**26.6%** (3)	25.6% (3)	14.7% (1)	2.8% (0)	3.0% (0)	12.1% (1)	5.1% (0)	3.8% (0)	6.0% (0)	–	0.4%	–	–	–	1.0%

== Results ==
Party	Votes	%	Seats	+/–
Democratic Party + People's Party	126,534	26.25	3	–1
Social Democrats	89,936	18.66	2	+1
List of Marjan Šarec	74,431	15.44	2	New
New Slovenia	53,621	11.12	1	0
The Left	30,983	6.43	0	0
Democratic Party of Pensioners of Slovenia	27,329	5.67	0	–1
Alliance of Alenka Bratušek	19,369	4.02	0	New
Slovenian National Party	19,347	4.01	0	0
Greens of Slovenia	10,706	2.22	0	0
Patriotic League	8,184	1.70	0	New
Let's Connect	7,980	1.66	0	New
Modern Centre Party	7,823	1.62	0	New
United Slovenia Movement	3,288	0.68	0	New
Good State	2,544	0.53	0	New
Total	482,075	100.00	8	0
Valid votes	482,075	97.89		
Invalid/blank votes	10,382	2.11		
Total votes	492,457	100.00		
Registered voters/turnout	1,704,866	28.89		
Source: Volitve

=== List of elected MEPs ===
MEP	Party	Preference votes	% of list	Term length
Tanja Fajon	SD	54,651	60.77%	1 July 2009 – 18 May 2022
Irena Joveva	LMŠ	42,190	56.68%	2 July 2019 –
Romana Tomc	SDS	40,668	32.14%	1 July 2014 –
Milan Zver	SDS	26,674	21.08%	1 July 2009 –
Ljudmila Novak	NSi	19,558	36.47%	20 July 2004 – 30 June 2009, 2 July 2019 –
Franc Bogovič	SLS	13,743	10.86%	1 July 2014 –
Milan Brglez	SD	7,152	7.95%	2 July 2019 –
Klemen Grošelj	LMŠ	6,494	8.72%	2 July 2019 –
Matjaž Nemec	SD	/	/	18 May 2022 –

== Inaccessible polling places dispute ==
Before the 2015 same-sex marriage referendum, two voters with disabilities requested that the authorities make their polling places accessible. Their requests were denied, and the courts rejected their lawsuits and appeals. Before the 2019 European Parliament elections, they extended their requests to these elections. When the authorities rejected their requests, they submitted, together with the Slovenian Disability Rights Association (Drupis), applications to the European Court of Human Rights. In January 2020, the Court communicated the cases with the government of Slovenia. As of January 2020, the cases, called Toplak v. Slovenia and Mrak v. Slovenia, are ongoing.

== The Right to Vote by Persons with Intellectual Disabilities ==
Before the 2019 European Parliament elections, disability groups Sonček and Slovenian Disability Rights Association, and a law professor Jurij Toplak, called for legislative amendments for the recognition of the right to vote for persons with disabilities, in line with the Convention on the Rights of Persons with Disabilities. They also initiated proceedings with the Constitutional Court of Slovenia, which rejected three of their appeals. They filed a complaint with the European Commission and asked for an infringement procedure. As of September 2020, the procedure is ongoing.
