= List of members of the European Parliament for Slovenia, 2009–2014 =

This is a list of the 7 members of the European Parliament for Slovenia in the 2009 to 2014 session. One person from Democratic Party entered the Parliament in December 2011, bringing the number of MEPs to 8.

== List ==
Name	National party	EP Group
Tanja Fajon	Social Democrats	S&D
Romana Jordan Cizelj	Democratic Party	EPP
Jelko Kacin	Liberal Democracy	ALDE
Zoran Thaler	Social Democrats	S&D
Zofija Mazej Kukovič	Democratic Party	EPP
Lojze Peterle	New Slovenia	EPP
Ivo Vajgl	Zares–Social Liberals	ALDE
Milan Zver	Democratic Party	EPP

=== Party representation ===
National party	EP Group	Seats	±
Democratic Party	EPP	3 / 7	Steady
Social Democrats	S&D	2 / 7	▲1
New Slovenia	EPP	1 / 7	▼1
Liberal Democracy	ALDE	1 / 7	▼1
Zares–Social Liberals	ALDE	1 / 7	▲1
