= Branko Grims =

Slovenian politician (born 1962)

Branko Grims MEP
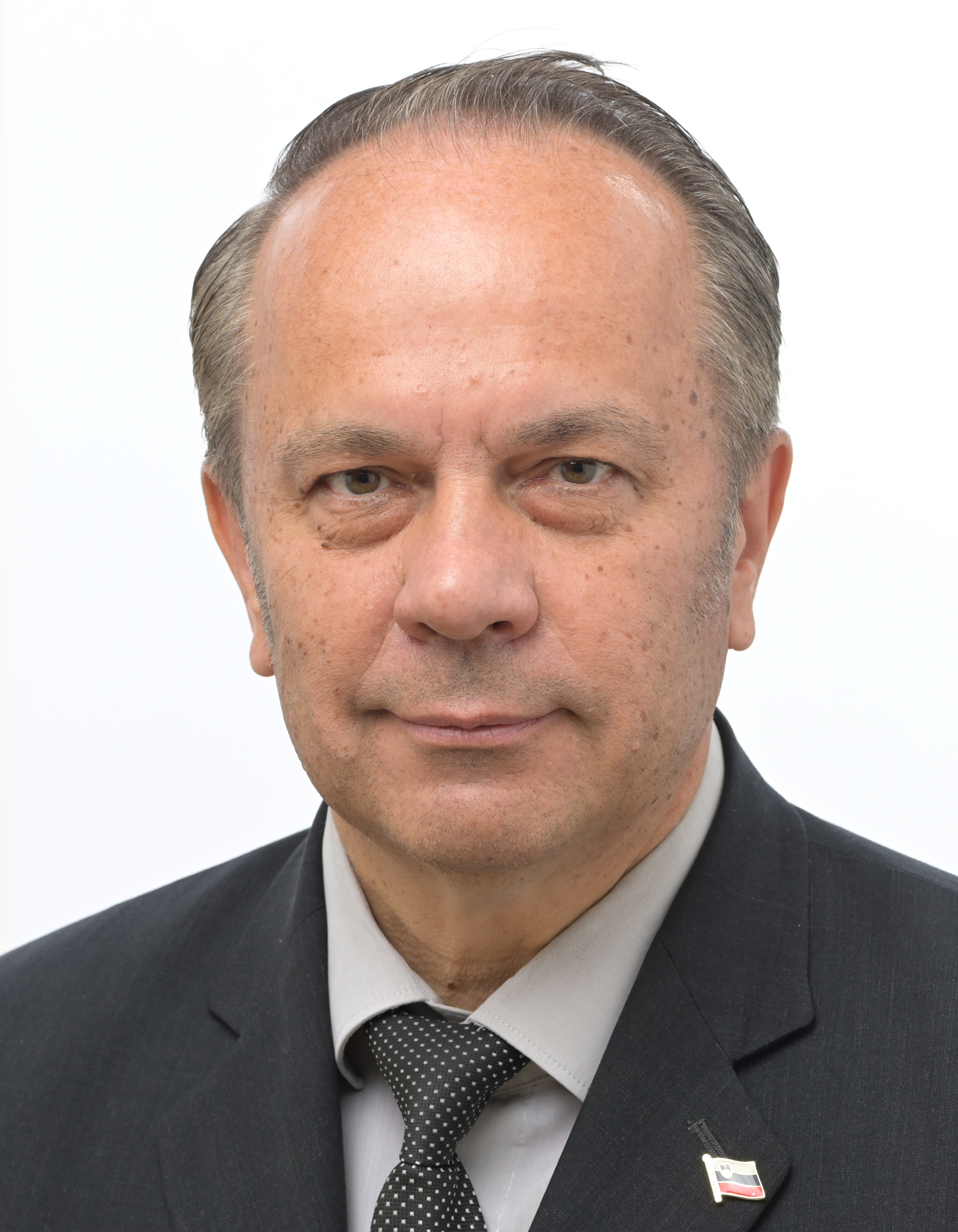
- Grims in 2024

Member of the European Parliament for Slovenia
- Incumbent
- Assumed office 16 July 2024

Personal details
- Born: 26 August 1962 (age 64) Kranj, Slovenia
- Party: Slovenian Democratic Party
- Other political affiliations: Patriots for Europe (since 2026); European People's Party (suspended in 2026)
- Education: University of Ljubljana
- Profession: politician

Branko Grims (born 26 August 1962) is a Slovenian politician for the Slovenian Democratic Party.

== Early life and education ==
Grims was born in Kranj and earned degrees in science and geology.

== Political career ==
After his studies, Grims worked in local politics in Kranj before embarking in national and European politics.

He was elected as Slovenian Democratic Party member of the European Parliament in 2024. He was a co-founder of the Slovenian Democratic Party and served in the National Assembly from 1990 to 1992 and 2004 to 2024, and in the National Council from 1997 to 2002.

In 2024, Grims stated "we need remigration" in his first speech to the European Parliament, suggesting "sending all those who abuse the acquis communautaire and asylum law back to where they came from".

In July 2026, Grims was expelled from the EPP political group of the European Parliament over his connections to the far-right and his failure to follow his group's voting recommendations. Months later, the far-right Patriots for Europe announced that Grims had adhered to their political group and had been immediately elected as their vice-president.
