= Klemen Grošelj =

Slovenian politician

Klemen Grošelj MEP
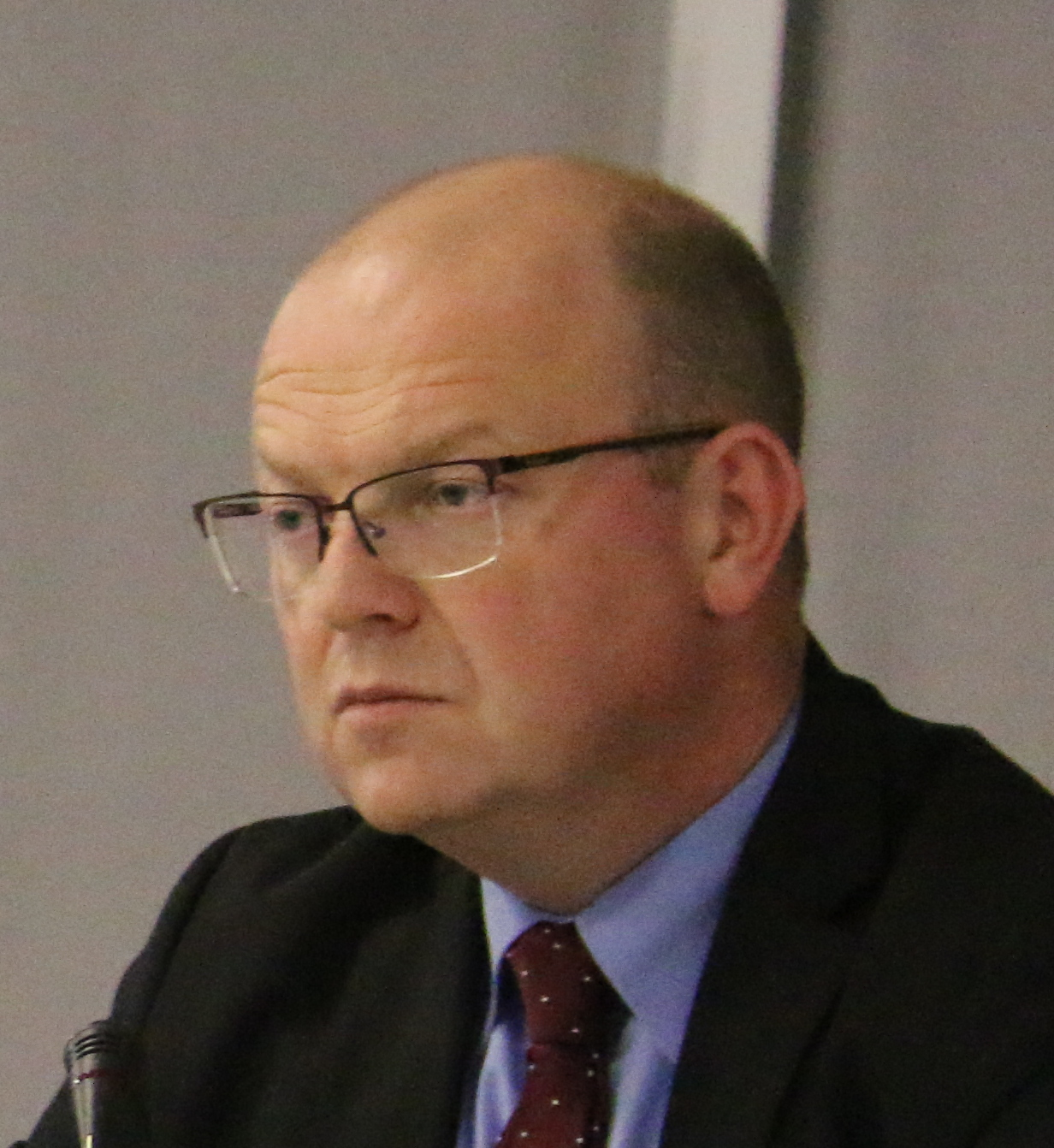
- Klemen Grošelj in 2023

Member of the European Parliament for Slovenia
- Incumbent
- Assumed office 2 July 2019

Personal details
- Born: 8 March 1976 (age 50) Kranj, Yugoslavia
- Party: List of Marjan Šarec (2018–2022); Freedom Movement (2022–2024); Rebirth (2025–)

Klemen Grošelj (born 8 March 1976) is a Slovenian politician and academic, who served as a Member of the European Parliament (MEP) from 2019 until 2024. As a MEP, he was a member of Renew Europe.

Grošelj has since been serving on the Committee on Foreign Affairs. In this capacity, he is his parliamentary group's shadow rapporteur on the accession of Serbia to the European Union. In addition to his committee assignments, he is part of the Parliament's delegation to the EU-Serbia Stabilisation and Association Parliamentary Committee and the European Parliament Intergroup on Western Sahara.

Prior to the 2024 European Parliament elections, Grošelj was a candidate on the Freedom Movement list, but due to disagreements within the party, Grošelj left the Freedom Movement to join the Greens of Slovenia, where he became the top candidate. With gaining only 1,61% of the votes in Slovenia, Grošelj was not reelected as MEP.
