= Romana Jordan =

Slovenian politician and physicist

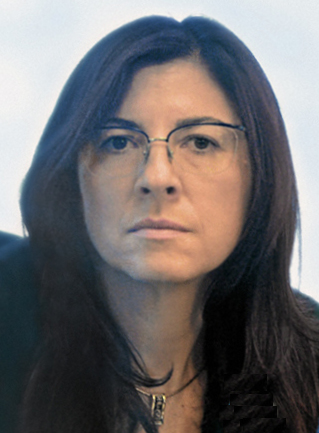

Personal details
- Born: 8 January 1966 (age 60) Celje, Yugoslavia (now Slovenia)
- Party: Democratic Party
- Education: University of Ljubljana

Romana Jordan (formerly known as Romana Jordan Cizelj, born 8 January 1966) is a Slovenian politician and physicist. She serves as the Assistant Director for EU Affairs at the Jožef Stefan Institute. She was elected as a Member of the European Parliament (MEP) in 2004-2014, during which she sat on the European Parliament's Committee on Industry, Research and Energy. She is a member of the Slovenian Democratic Party, which is part of the European People's Party.

Romana Jordan was born in the Styrian town of Celje, where she attended the Celje First Grammar School. In 1990 she graduated in electrical engineering at the University of Ljubljana and in 2000 she obtained a PhD on a thesis on nuclear engineering. Between 1990 and 2002 she worked as a researcher at the Jožef Stefan Institute in Ljubljana.

She entered active politics in 1998, when she was elected on the Supervisory Board of the municipality of Domžale. In 2002, she was elected member of the Domžale Municipal Council on the list of the Slovenian Democratic Party. In 2004, she was elected to the European Parliament.

Romana Jordan is a substitute for the Committee on Budgets, a substitute for the temporary committee on policy challenges and budgetary means of the enlarged Union 2007–2013, a member of the delegation for relations with the United States, and a substitute for the delegation for relations with Canada. She represented the Parliament at the 2008 United Nations Climate Change Conference in Poznań, Poland and the 2009 United Nations Climate Change Conference in Copenhagen.
