= Party of Alenka Bratušek =

Slovene political party

Party of Alenka Bratušek Stranka Alenke Bratušek
- Leader: Alenka Bratušek
- Founded: 31 May 2014
- Dissolved: 27 June 2022
- Split from: Positive Slovenia
- Merged into: Freedom Movement
- Headquarters: Ljubljana
- Ideology: Social liberalism Pro-Europeanism
- Political position: Centre to centre-left
- Regional affiliation: Liberal South East European Network (LIBSEEN)
- European affiliation: Alliance of Liberals and Democrats for Europe

Website
- www.sab.si

The Party of Alenka Bratušek (Slovene: Stranka Alenke Bratušek, SAB) was a political party in Slovenia. The party was formed from a split from Positive Slovenia in May 2014, and merged into the Freedom Movement in June 2022. The party participated in both the Bratušek and Šarec governments.

== History ==
The party was formed by Alenka Bratušek, who resigned as Prime Minister of Slovenia on 5 May 2014, and other former members of Positive Slovenia (PS). The party was founded on 31 May 2014 under the name the Alliance of Alenka Bratušek (Zavezništvo Alenke Bratušek, ZaAB).

Among the founding members were incumbent PS MPs Maša Kociper, Jerko Čehovin, Jani Möderndorfer, Maja Dimitrovski, former MP Peter Vilfan, ministers Roman Jakič and Metod Dragonja. Present were also several guests: former Mercator retail group chief executive Miran Goslar, Verjamem party leader Igor Šoltes, MEP Tanja Fajon and Social Democrat MP Matjaž Han, Zares party president Darja Radić and the Democratic Party of Pensioners of Slovenia's Gorazd Žmauc.

The party won 4.34% of the vote in 13 July 2014's Slovenian parliamentary election – and four seats in parliament.

On 21 November 2014, the party became a full member of the Alliance of Liberals and Democrats for Europe Party.

On 21 May 2016 the party was renamed to the Alliance of Social-Liberal Democrats (Zavezništvo socialno-liberalnih demokratov). On 7 October 2017, the party again changed its title to include the founder's name in preparation for the upcoming parliamentary elections, becoming the Party of Alenka Bratušek. The party's Secretary General Jernej Pavlič stated that the name was changed to improve name recognition.

In the 3 June 2018 parliamentary election, the party garnered 5.11% of the vote and won five MP seats. In 13 September 2018 party became a coalition partner in the Šarec government, a cabinet formed by the List of Marjan Šarec, Social Democrats, Modern Centre Party and Democratic Party of Pensioners of Slovenia.

In the 2022 Slovenian parliamentary election, the party failed to win any seats in the National Assembly. Subsequently, the party members voted in June 2022 to dissolve the party and merge with the Freedom Movement, the social liberal party of Robert Golob which formed government after the 2022 general election. The Freedom Movement voted in favor of the merger on 27 June, with the official merger completed on 12 July.

== Leadership ==
President

- Alenka Bratušek

Vice-Presidents

- Maša Kociper
- Tatjana Voj
- Slavko Šterman

Party Council

Members elected in 2014 included Metod Dragonja, Roman Jakič, Jani Möderndorfer and Stojan Pelko.

Supervisory board

Members elected in 2014 included Nika Poglajen, Tatjana Voj, Dejan Radunić.

== Electoral results ==
=== National Assembly ===
Election	Leader	Votes	%	Seats	+/–	Government
2014	Alenka Bratušek	38,293	4.38 (#7)	4 / 90	New	Opposition
2018	Alenka Bratušek	45,492	5.11 (#7)	5 / 90	▲1	Coalition 2018–20
2018	Alenka Bratušek	45,492	5.11 (#7)	5 / 90	▲1	Opposition 2020–22
2022	Alenka Bratušek	31,117	2.61 (#9)	0 / 90	▼5	Extra-parliamentary; Government

=== European Parliament ===
Election	Leader	Votes	%	Seats	+/–
2019	Angelika Mlinar	19,369	4.0 (#7)	0 / 8	New
