= 2004 European Parliament election in Slovenia =

13 June 2004	2009 →

7 seats to the European Parliament
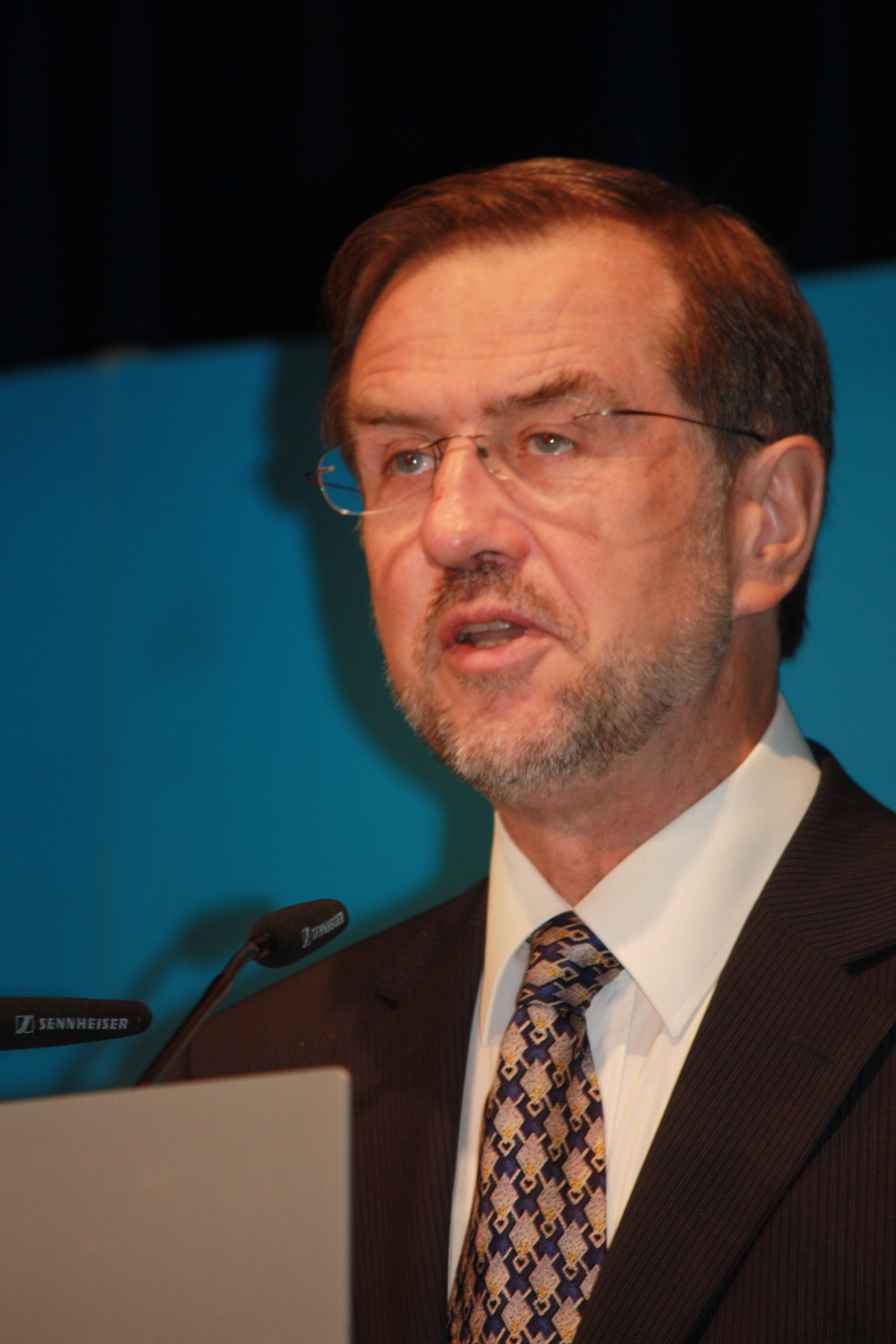

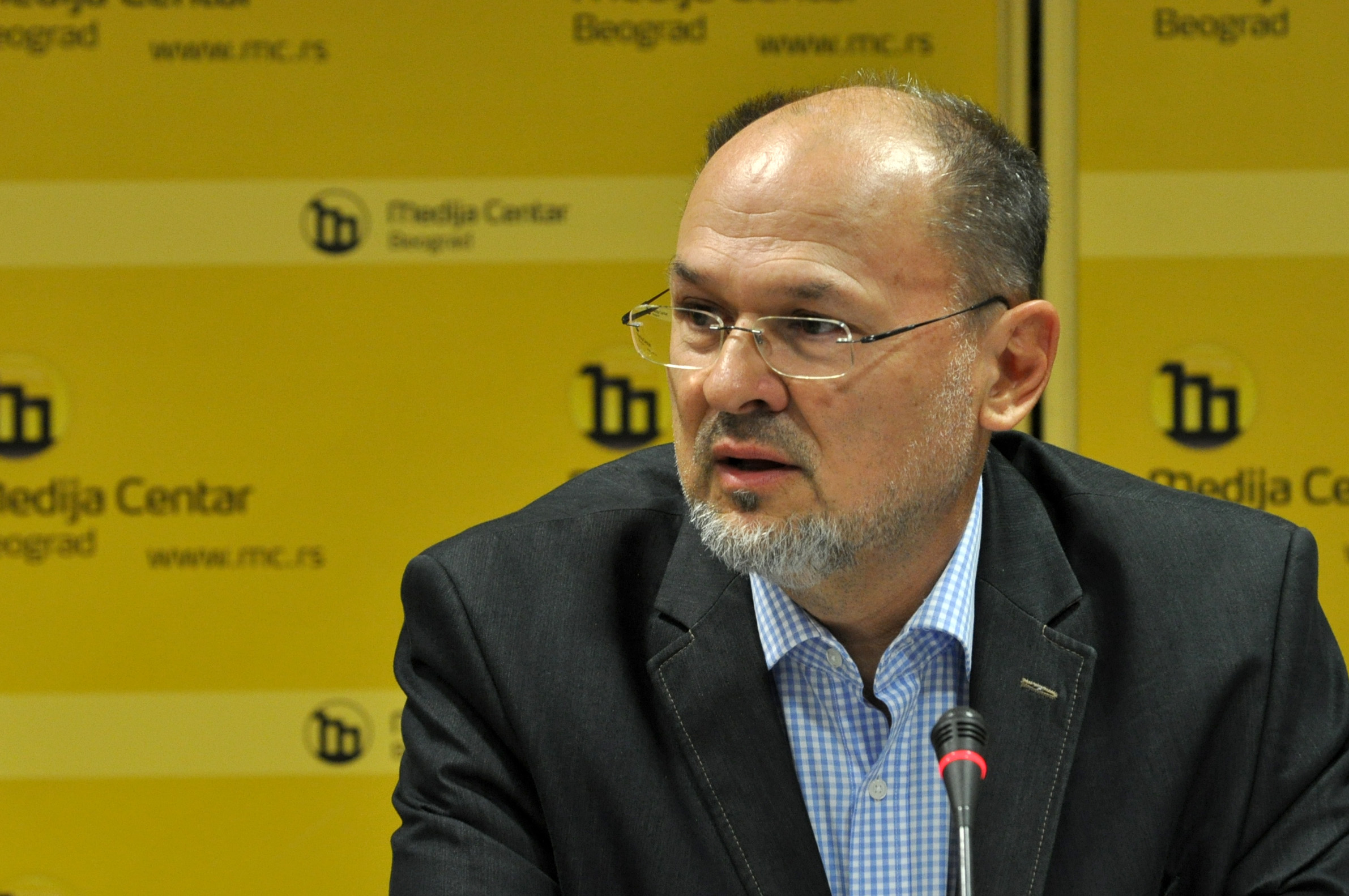

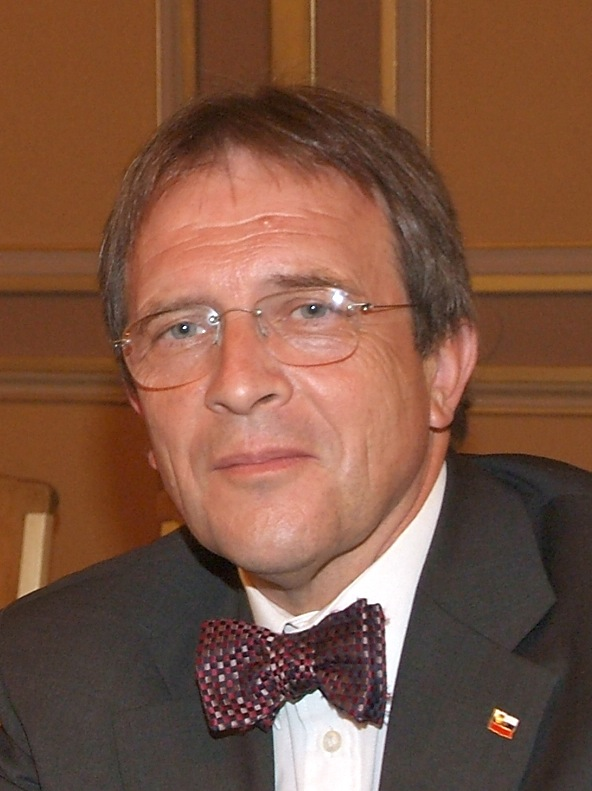

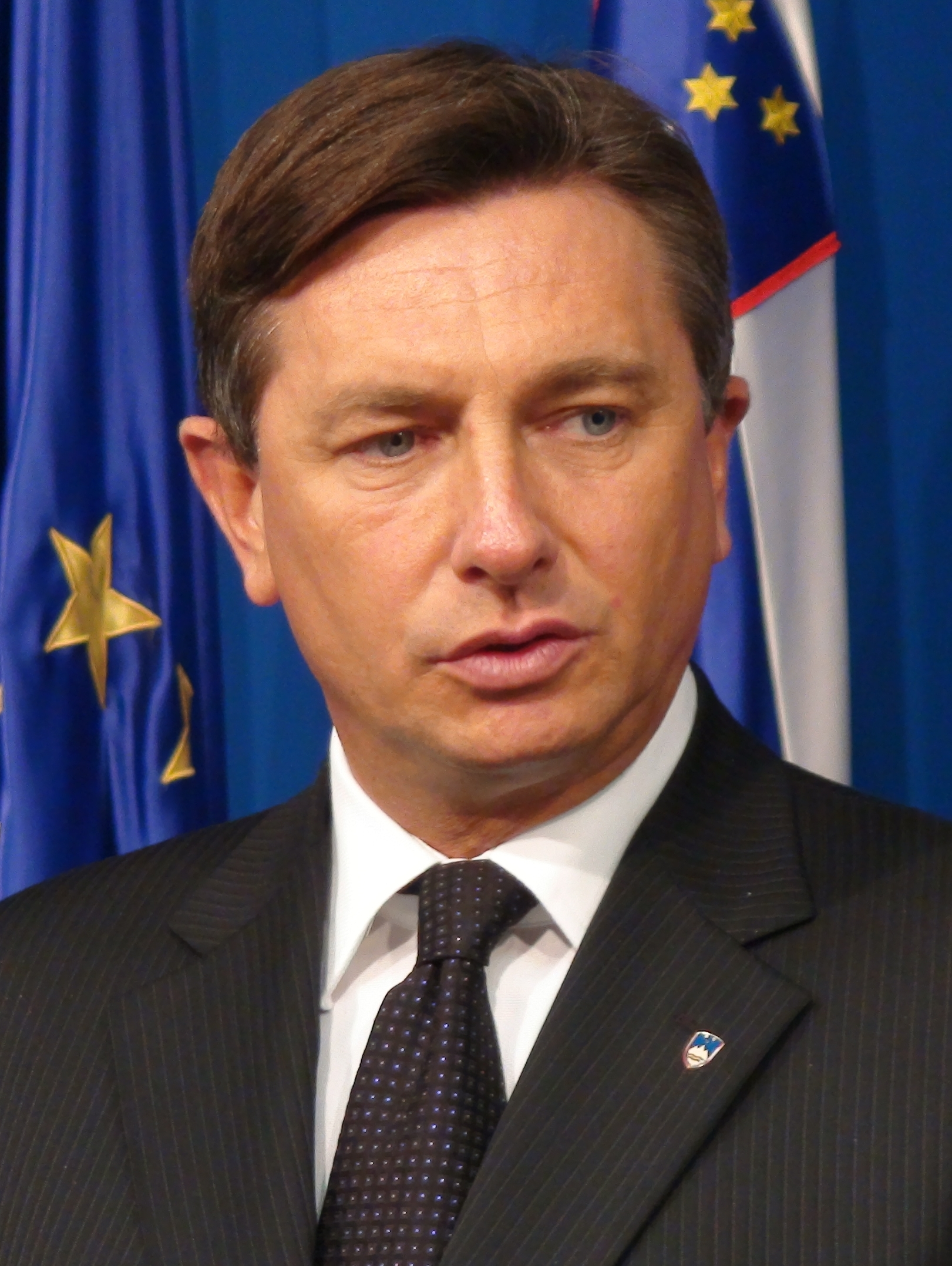
	First party	Second party	Third party
Leader	Lojze Peterle	Jelko Kacin	Mihael Brejc
Party	NSi	LDS	SDS
Alliance	EPP	ALDE	EPP
Last election	First Election	First Election	First Election
Seats before	0	0	0
Seats after	2	2	2
Seat change	▲2	▲2	▲2
Popular vote	102,753	95,489	76,945
Percentage	23.57 %	21.91 %	17.65 %
Swing	▲23.57 %	▲21.91 %	▲9.01 %
	Fourth party
Leader	Borut Pahor
Party	SD
Alliance	PES
Last election	First Election
Seats before	0
Seats after	1
Seat change	▲1
Popular vote	61,672
Percentage	14.65%
Swing	▲14.65 %

The 2004 European Parliament election in Slovenia was the election of MEP representing Slovenia constituency for the 2004-2009 term of the European Parliament. It was the first European Parliament election in Slovenia following its admission to the European Union in May 2004. It was part of the wider 2004 European election. The vote took place on 13 June.

The biggest surprise was the victory of the New Slovenia – Christian People's Party over the Liberal Democracy of Slovenia and the defeat of the Slovene People's Party, which did not win a seat. The parties on the right of centre that form the opposition in the Slovenian national parliament won this election.

== Results ==
Party	Votes	%	Seats
New Slovenia	102,753	23.57	2
Liberal Democracy–DeSUS	95,489	21.91	2
Slovenian Democratic Party	76,945	17.65	2
United List of Social-Democrats	61,672	14.15	1
Slovenian People's Party	36,662	8.41	0
Slovenian National Party	21,883	5.02	0
Slovenia is Ours	17,930	4.11	0
Youth Party–Greens	10,027	2.30	0
Voice of Slovenian Women	5,249	1.20	0
Party of Ecological Movements	2,588	0.59	0
National Labour Party	2,022	0.46	0
Party of Slovenian People	1,386	0.32	0
Democratic Party, Democrats	1,263	0.29	0
Total	435,869	100.00	7
Valid votes	435,869	94.38	
Invalid/blank votes	25,938	5.62	
Total votes	461,807	100.00	
Registered voters/turnout	1,628,918	28.35	
Source: DVK
