= Freedom Movement (Slovenia) =

Political party in Slovenia

Freedom Movement Gibanje Svoboda
- Abbreviation: GS
- Chairman: Robert Golob
- General Secretary: Matej Grah
- Vice Chairman: Sara Žibrat; Matej Arčon; Klemen Boštjančič
- Founders: Jure Leben; Robert Golob
- Founded: Original form: 8 May 2021; 5 years, 6 months ago Current form: 26 January 2022; 4 years, 9 months ago
- Merger of: List of Marjan Šarec; Party of Alenka Bratušek
- Preceded by: Green Actions Party
- Headquarters: Ameriška ulica 8, Ljubljana
- Youth wing: Freedom Movement Youth
- Membership (2022): ▲3,000
- Ideology: Social liberalism Pro-Europeanism
- Political position: Centre to centre-left
- European affiliation: Alliance of Liberals and Democrats for Europe Party
- European Parliament group: Renew Europe
- Colours: Blue (Note: Formerly, Green, as Z.DEJ)
- Slogan: Slovenija naprej. ('Slovenia Forward.')
- National Assembly: 29 / 90
- European Parliament: 2 / 9
- Mayors: 1 / 212
- Municipal council: 266 / 2,750

Website
- gibanjesvoboda.si

The Freedom Movement (Slovene: Gibanje Svoboda, GS) is a social-liberal political party in Slovenia. It was founded on 26 January 2022, as the successor of the extraparliamentary Green Actions Party (Slovene: Stranka Zelenih Dejanj, Z.DEJ), which was founded on 8 May 2021. In its first parliamentary election, the party placed first, obtaining 41 of the 90 seats in the National Assembly, which is a record for a single party in the history of independent Slovenia. Its chairman Robert Golob subsequently became Prime Minister of Slovenia, heading the Golob Cabinet in coalition with the Social Democrats and The Left. Shortly after the elections, the Party of Alenka Bratušek and List of Marjan Šarec merged with the party.

== History ==
=== Z.DEJ (2021–2022) ===
Logo as the Green Actions Party (Z.DEJ)

Jure Leben, the former Minister for the environment in the Cabinet of Marjan Šarec, has announced the purpose of establishing a political party in January 2021 in political show Studio City. The party was established on 8 May 2021 and Leben was elected as their first and sole president of the party. The party would look for environmental balance, between industrial progress and preserving the environment. Leben was elected as the first chairman and Gregor Erbežnik became the vice-chairman. The leadership elected 119 delegates. The party never received much public support in opinion polling. In January 2022, Leben announced retreat from the party and politics, as he said that he would dedicate his time to his family.

=== Freedom Movement (2022–present) ===
On 24 January 2022, Robert Golob, at that time still the Chairman of the board at GEN-I, announced his candidature for the President of the party in decline, its transformation and changing the name to the Freedom Movement. The congress took place on 26 January 2022, Robert Golob was elected as the president, Urška Klakočar Zupančič as vice-president. Mirta Koželj became the President of the party council. Matej Arčon was elected as general secretary of the party. For the party to protect itself from incited members and hostile takeover attempts, there is a prerequisite for joining the party, which consists of an interview with Robert Golob for every MP candidate Unaffiliated MPs Janja Sluga (previously SMC) and Jurij Lep (previously DeSUS) also joined the party. After the elections, Golob has said that he is ready to partner with KUL, which is their »natural ally«. On the 1st of February he responded to the joint meeting with the parties of KUL.

On 17 February, the presidents of the Freedom Movement and LIDE had a meeting; both presidents decided that their parties would not participate with a joint electoral list, but there was still a possibility that there could be someone from LIDE to participate on the Freedom Movement list. On 19 March 2022, there was an election convention of the party, at which they represented their program for the elections and their candidacy list, which included some famous names such as former boxer Dejan Zavec, journalist of RTV Slovenija Mojca Šetinc Pašek, mayor of Tržič Borut Sajovic, an expert for Nuclear security Miroslav Gregorič, former University of Ljubljana rector Igor Papič, and orthopedist Danijel Bešič Loredan.

=== Election Win (April 2022) ===
In the 2022 parliamentary elections, the Freedom Movement placed first with 34.5% of the vote and won 41 of the 90 seats in the National Assembly, defeating the Slovenian Democratic Party and its three-term prime minister Janez Janša. The Social Democrats announced that they would join a government led by Golob, in addition to The Left, giving him a majority in the legislature and making him Prime Minister of Slovenia, an office he assumed on 25 May 2022. In June 2022, the List of Marjan Šarec and Party of Alenka Bratušek voted in favor of merging into the party, which was approved by the Freedom Movement on 27 June. The official merger was scheduled for the first half of July. After the merger, the party got representatives in the European Parliament via former members of LMŠ, Irena Joveva and Klemen Grošelj.

== Ideology and platform ==
The Freedom Movement is a social liberal party, with a pro-European and centrist orientation. As social measures, the party points out publicly available health care and the increase in the number of employees, the reform of the education system and the digitalisation of schools. According to former party chairman Leben, Slovenia should be able to rank among the 20 globally most competitive countries in the World Economic Forum criteria.

== Election results ==
=== Presidential ===
Election	Candidate	1st round		2nd round		Result
Election	Candidate	Popular vote	% of vote	Popular vote	% of vote	Result
2022 (Note: Supported Social Democrats candidate.)	Milan Brglez	134,726	15.45 (#3)	—	—	Lost

=== National Assembly ===
Election	Leader	Votes	% of vote	Seats	+/–	Government
2022	Robert Golob	410,769	34.45% (#1)	41 / 90	New	Coalition
2026	Robert Golob	338,102	28.66% (#1)	29 / 90	▼12	Opposition

=== European Parliament ===
Election	List leader	Votes	%	Seats	+/–	EP Group
2024	Irena Joveva	148,291	22,16 (2nd)	2 / 9	New	RE

== See also ==
- List of political parties in Slovenia
