= Zala Tomašič =

Slovenian politician

Zala Tomašič MEP
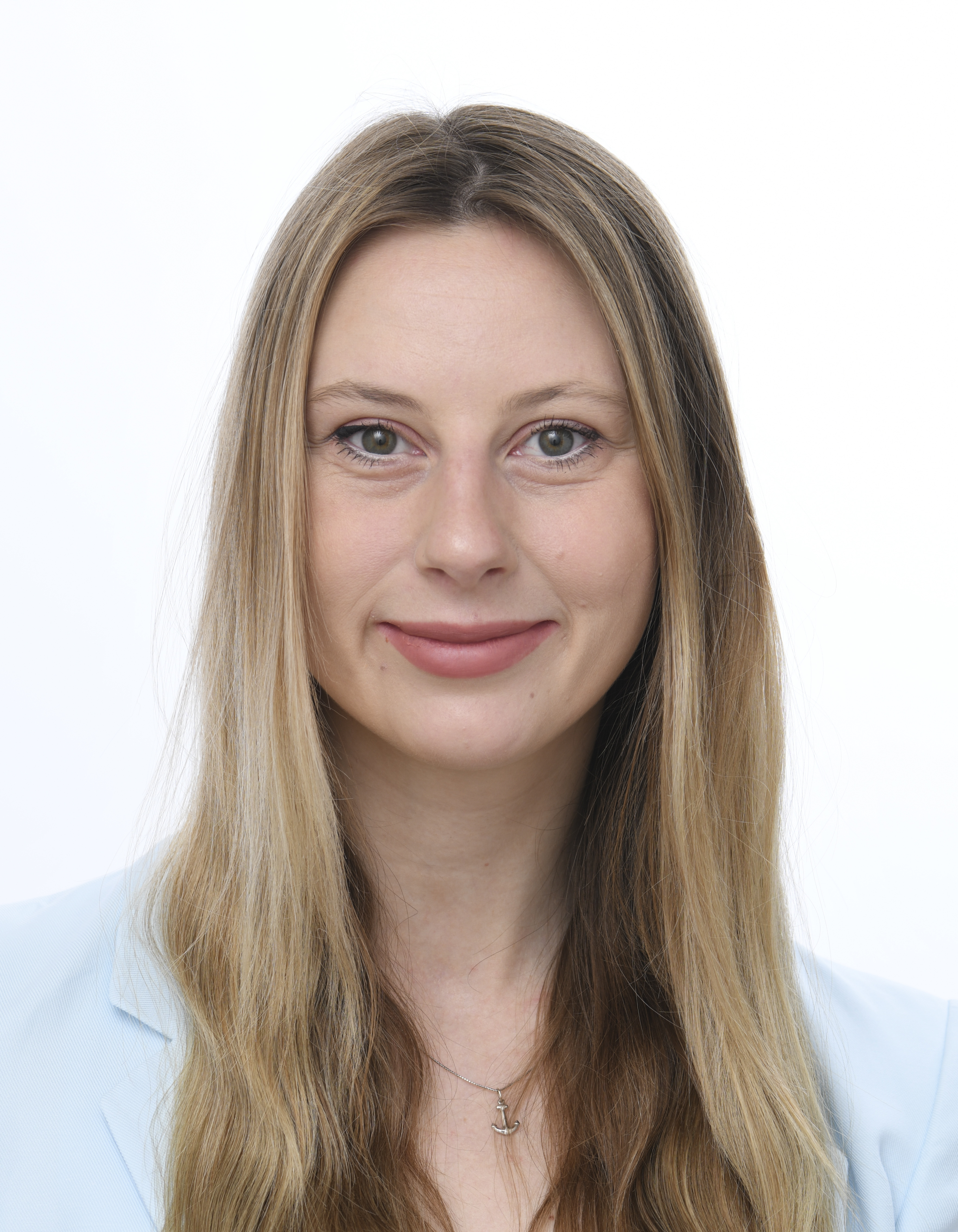

Member of the European Parliament for Slovenia
- Incumbent
- Assumed office 16 July 2024

Personal details
- Born: 29 September 1995 (age 30) Kranj, Slovenia
- Party: Slovenian Democratic Party

Zala Tomašič (born 29 September 1995) is a Slovenian politician for the right-wing conservative SDS. She is a member of the European Parliament with her term starting on 16 July 2024.

She is the youngest elected Member of the European Parliament in the history of Slovenia.
