= Franc Bogovič =

Slovenian politician

Franc Bogovič MEP
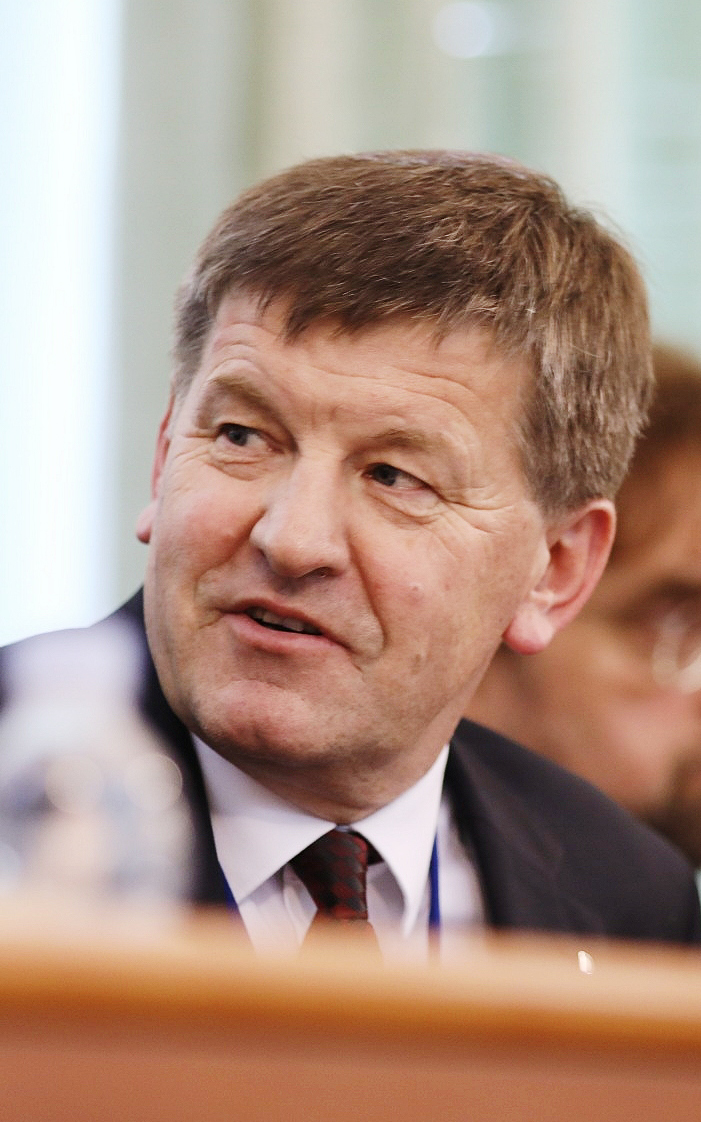

Member of the European Parliament for Slovenia
- Incumbent
- Assumed office 1 July 2014

Personal details
- Born: 2 February 1963 (age 63) Senovo, Slovenia, Yugoslavia

Franc Bogovič (born 2 February 1963) is a Slovenian politician who was first elected as a Member of the European Parliament in 2014 and re-elected in 2019. In addition to his committee assignments, he is part of the European Parliament Intergroup on Climate Change, Biodiversity and Sustainable Development.
