= Patricija Šulin =

Slovenian politician (1965–2021)

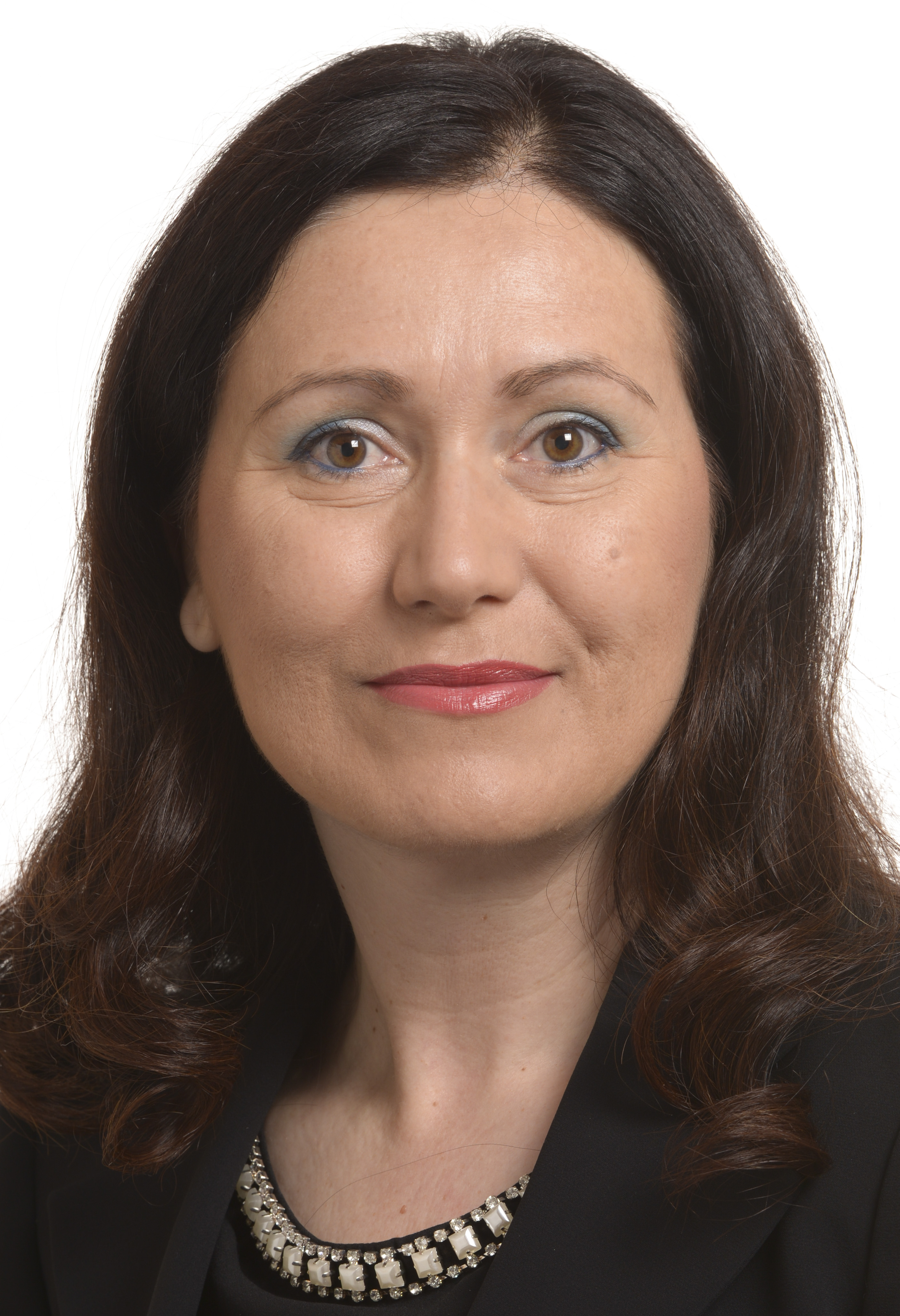

Member of the European Parliament
- In office 1 July 2014 – 1 July 2019

Member of the National Assembly of Slovenia
- In office 2012–2013

Personal details
- Born: 25 November 1965 Šempeter-Vrtojba, SR Slovenia, SFR Yugoslavia
- Died: 2 November 2021 (aged 55)
- Party: SDS; EPP Group

Patricija Šulin (25 November 1965 – 2 November 2021) was a Slovenian politician. A member of the Slovenian Democratic Party and the European People's Party Group, she served in the European Parliament from 2014 to 2019 and in the National Assembly of Slovenia from 2012 to 2013.
