= Mojca Drčar Murko =

Slovenian politician

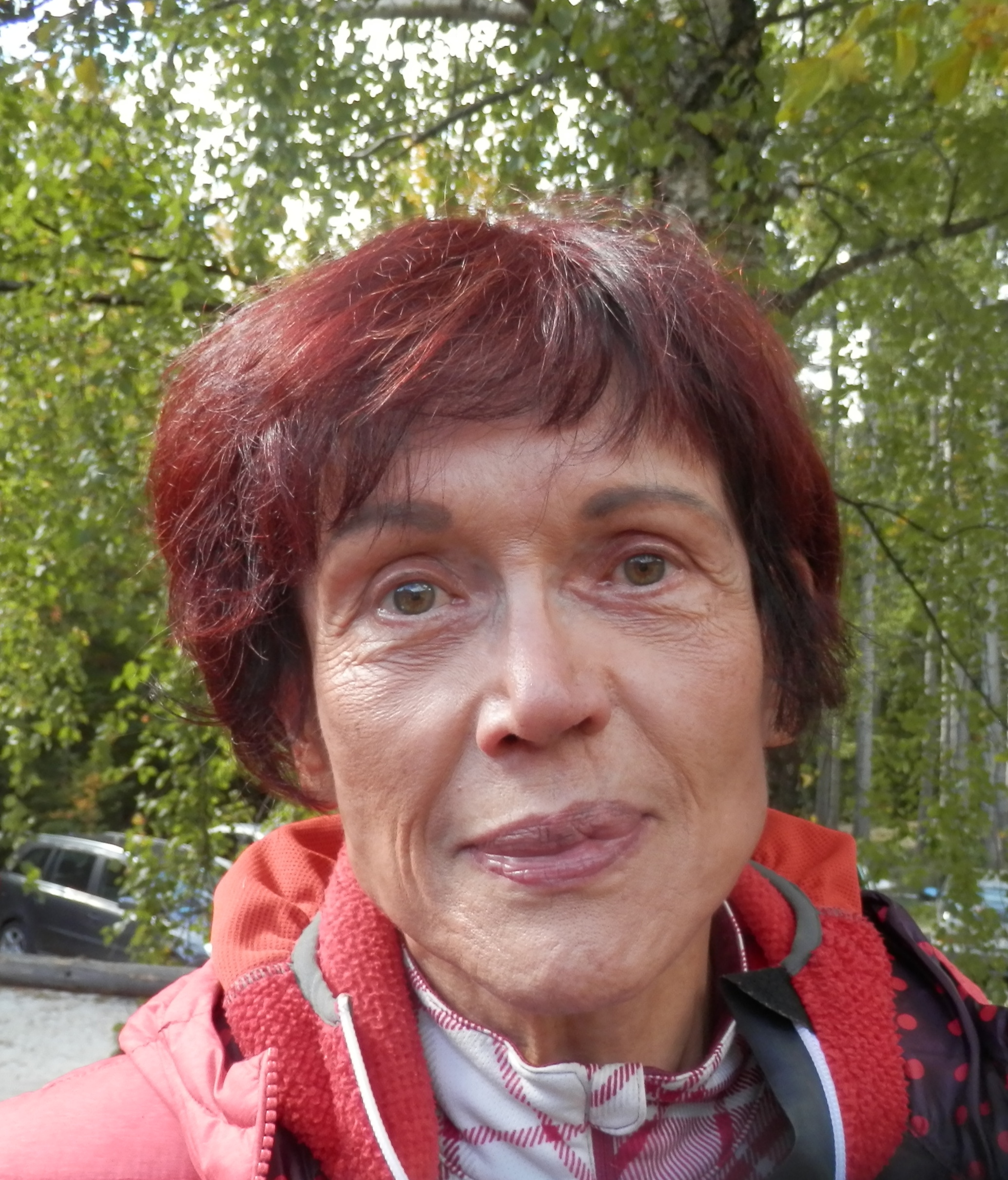
Mojca Drčar Murko

Mojca Drčar Murko (born 2 July 1942 in Ljubljana) is a Slovenian politician and a former Member of the European Parliament. She is a member of Liberal Democracy of Slovenia, which is part of the Alliance of Liberals and Democrats for Europe, and sits on the European Parliament's Committee on the Environment, Public Health and Food Safety.

She is also a substitute for the Committee on Regional Development, a member of the delegation to the EU–North Macedonia Joint Parliamentary Committee, a substitute for the delegation to the EU–Croatia Joint Parliamentary Committee, and a substitute for the delegation to the Euro-Mediterranean Parliamentary Assembly.

== Education ==
- 1965: Law degree from the University of Ljubljana
- 1973: Master's degree in public and civil law from the University of Zagreb

== Career ==
- Foreign correspondent for Delo newspaper (1978–1982 in Bonn, 1989–1993 in Rome and 1997–2004 in Vienna)
- 1974-1976: Chairwoman of the tribunal of the Journalists' Association of Slovenia
