= Irena Joveva =

Slovenian politician

Irena Joveva MEP
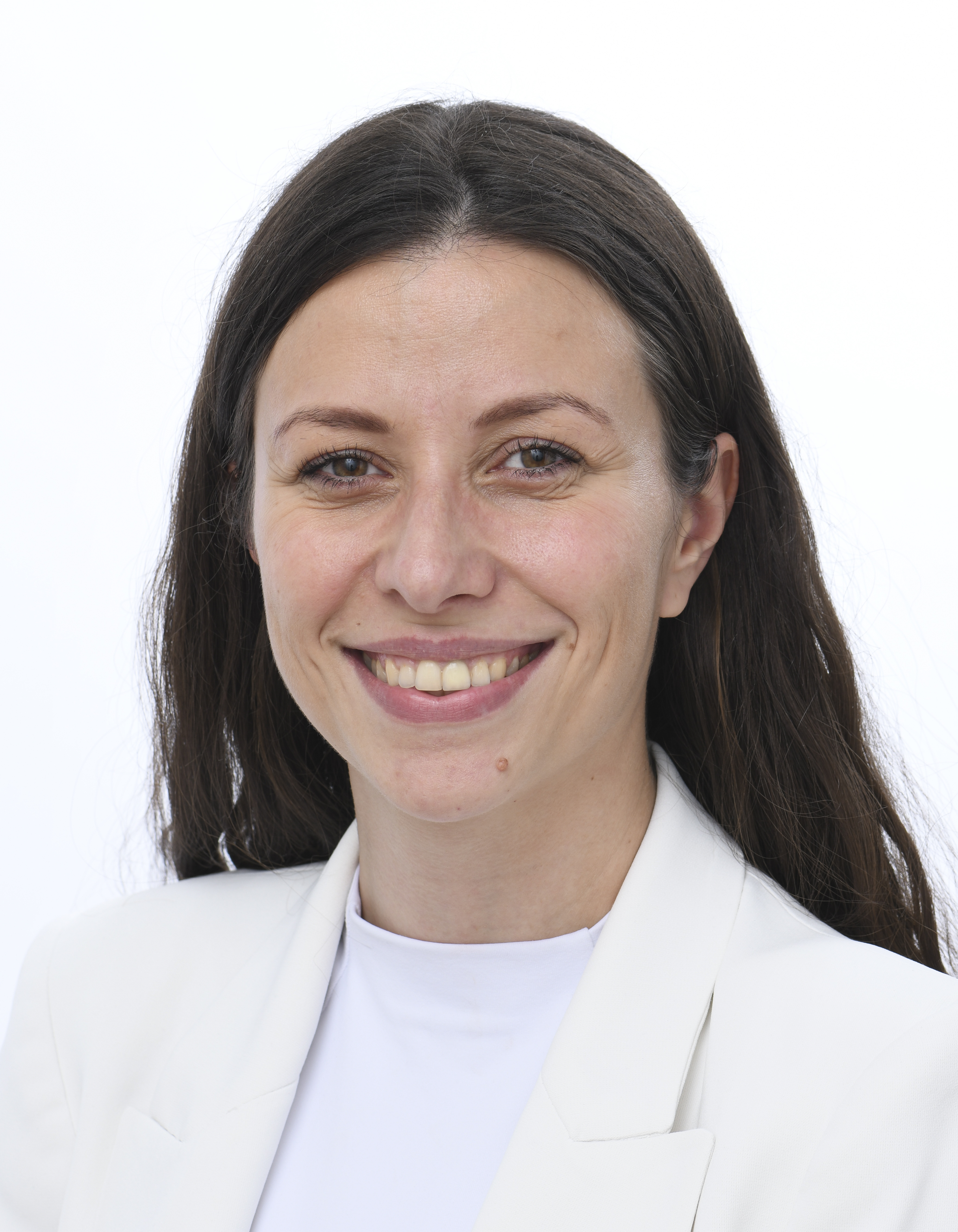
- Official portrait, 2024

Member of the European Parliament for Slovenia
- Incumbent
- Assumed office 2 July 2019

Personal details
- Born: 26 February 1989 (age 37) Kranj, SR Slovenia, SFR Yugoslavia
- Party: GS (since 2022)
- Other political affiliations: LMS (until 2022)
- Children: 1
- Education: University of Ljubljana

Irena Joveva (born 26 February 1989) is a Slovenian politician. She has been serving as a Member of the European Parliament for Slovenia since 2019, representing the Freedom Movement. Prior to her political career, she worked as a journalist.

== Early life and education ==
Joveva was born in Kranj. She grew up in a working-class family in Jesenice. Her parents are Macedonian, and moved from SR Macedonia, another republic within Yugoslavia, to SR Slovenia as economic migrants in the 1970s.

After completing her secondary economics school in Radovljica, she continued her studies at the Faculty of Social Sciences in Ljubljana. She graduated in International Relations and completed her master's degree in World Studies in 2017, focusing on the European Union's approach to the Macedonian national issue.

== Journalism ==
She was employed in the domestic political editorial team of the Slovenian Press Agency. Her coverage included domestic politics and the public sector. In 2014, she received the Watchdog Award from the Slovene Association of Journalists for Debutant of the Year. From 2015 until her candidacy for the European Parliament in 2019, she worked as a journalist for daily news "24UR" on POP TV. Her reporting focused on domestic politics, foreign affairs, European topics, migration, arbitration, and protests across Europe.

== Political career ==
On 4 March 2019, List of Marjan Šarec (LMŠ) announced that Joveva would lead the list’s ticket in the upcoming European Parliament elections. She was elected with the second-highest number of preferential votes (42,190) and became a Member of the European Parliament. Alongside her, Klemen Grošelj was also elected from the LMŠ party. Upon her election, she among other things promised transparent operation by publicly disclosing meetings with lobbyists and the use of her office's funds — ultimately remaining the only Slovenian MEP to consistently follow through on these commitments.

During her first term in the European Parliament, Irena Joveva served as the Renew Europe group's rapporteur on the European Media Freedom Act (EMFA), one of the most prominent legislative files in the area of media policy during the 2019–2024 mandate. Drawing on her background as a political journalist, she played a key role in shaping the Parliament’s position on the proposal, which sought to bolster press freedom, media pluralism, and editorial independence across the European Union.

In the 2024 European Parliament elections, Irena Joveva successfully ran as the lead candidate for Gibanje Svoboda (Freedom Movement), the liberal party affiliated with the Renew Europe group. Building on her visibility and legislative work from the previous term, she significantly increased her electoral support, winning 71,205 preferential votes—the second-highest number among all candidates in Slovenia. The party’s second seat in the European Parliament was secured by Marjan Šarec, former Prime Minister of Slovenia. Following the election, Joveva was appointed Vice-President of the Renew Europe group, marking a notable step in her political trajectory and positioning her as one of the key liberal voices in the new European Parliament.

She is a member of the Committee on Employment and Social Affairs (EMPL) and the Committee on Civil Liberties, Justice and Home Affairs (LIBE). Additionally, she serves as a substitute member of the Committee on the Environment, Public Health and Food Safety (ENVI) and the Subcommittee on Public Health (SANT).

In addition to committee work, she is active in delegations responsible for inter-parliamentary relations. She holds full membership in the Delegation for relations with Palestine (DPAL) and serves as a substitute member in the Delegation for relations with Bosnia and Herzegovina and Kosovo (including the Stabilisation and Association Parliamentary Committees), as well as the ACP–EU Joint Parliamentary Assembly and the Africa–EU Parliamentary Assembly.
