= Milan Brglez =

Slovenian politician (born 1967)

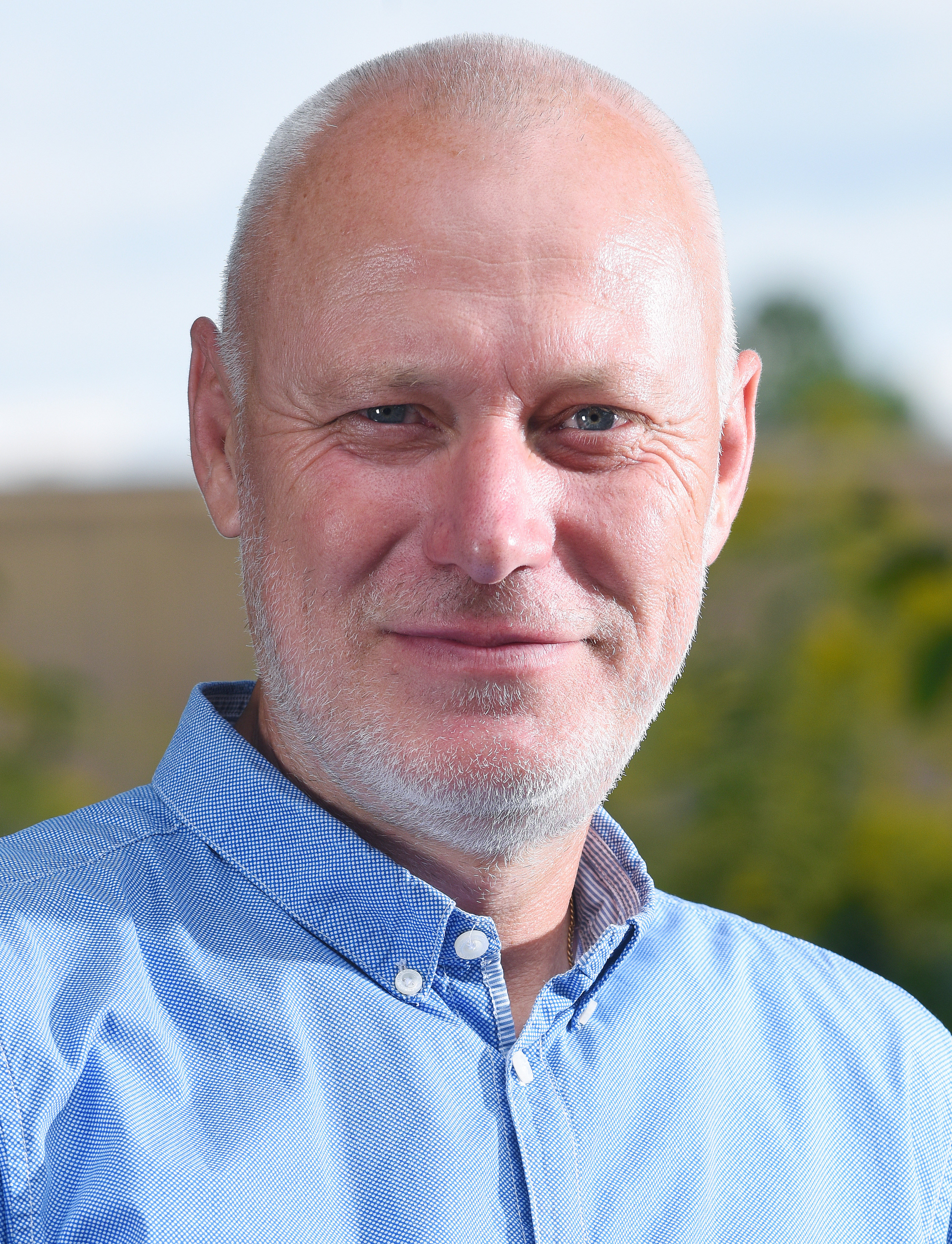
- Formal portrait, 2019

Member of the European Parliament
- In office 2 July 2019 – 15 July 2024
- Constituency: Slovenia

Speaker of the National Assembly of Slovenia
- In office 1 August 2014 – 22 June 2018
- Preceded by: Janko Veber
- Succeeded by: Matej Tonin

Personal details
- Born: 1 September 1967 (age 59) Ljubljana, SR Slovenia, Yugoslavia
- Party: Social Democrats (2018–present)
- Other political affiliations: Modern Centre Party (2014–2018)
- Education: University of Ljubljana

Milan Brglez (Slovene pronunciation: [ˈmíːlam ˈbə́ɾɡlɛs]; born 1 September 1967) is a Slovenian political scientist and politician who served as Speaker of the National Assembly of Slovenia from 2014 to 2018. He served as a Member of the European Parliament (MEP) between 2019 and 2024. A member of the Social Democrats, part of the Party of European Socialists, Brglez was a candidate in the 2022 presidential election.

== Education ==
Brglez graduated in political science at the Faculty of Social, Political Sciences and Journalism, University of Ljubljana, and completed his master's degree in international law at the Faculty of Law, University of Ljubljana. He obtained his PhD in international relations, specialising in theory of international relations with thesis entitled “The Meaning of Non-Positivist Epistemological and Realist Ontological Assumptions for Theorising International Relations and International Relations Research Methodologies”.

== Career in academia ==
In 1992, Brglez started his work at the Faculty of Social, Political Sciences and Journalism as teaching assistant at the Chair of International Relations covering courses of Politics of International Law, Diplomatic and Consular Relations, and International Relations. In 2007, he became assistant professor and course holder of Diplomatic and Consular Relations, Theory of International Relations, Selected Issues of International Law, Selected Issues of Diplomatic Law, and European Protection of Human Rights. In 2008, he took the position as head of the Department for International Relations at the Faculty of Social Sciences (University of Ljubljana).

== Political career ==
=== Career in national politics ===
In 2014, Brglez entered national politics when he joined the newly established Party of Miro Cerar (SMC, in 2015 renamed to Modern Centre Party). He served as vice president of the party. At the parliamentary election in July 2014, Brglez was elected to the National Assembly, where SMC won plurality with 36 out of 90 seats. On the 1st of August, he was elected as the Speaker of the National Assembly, thus succeeding Janko Veber of the Social Democrats.

In the 2018 election Brglez was re-elected to the National Assembly with the SMC party. However following some disagreements with party officials, Brglez announced on the 26th of June 2018, that he had been expelled from the party. The official decision on his exclusion has still not been given to date. In November 2018, he joined the Social Democrats.

From 2018 to 2019 he was Deputy Chair of the Committee on European Union Affairs and a member of the Committee of Foreign Policy and Committee on Education, Science, Sport and Youth.

=== Member of the European Parliament (2019–2024) ===
Following the 2019 European election in May 2019, Brglez became a Member of the European Parliament from Slovenia on the list of Social Democrats. He was a member of the Committee on Employment and Social Affairs, and substitute member of the committee on the Environment, Public Health and Food Safety. In addition to his committee assignments, he was part of the European Parliament Intergroup on LGBT Rights.

== Honors and achievements ==
- Prešeren Award from the Faculty of Social, Political Sciences and Journalism for undergraduate thesis titled Immunities and Privileges in Modern Diplomatic and Consular Law: A Comparative Analysis.
- Zore Award for master thesis titled The Codification of Contemporary Diplomatic Law.
- Best 2006 PhD thesis award of the Faculty of Social Sciences, University of Ljubljana.
- (Co)author of 11 scientific papers, five chapters in monographs and four scientific monographs.
- (Co)supervisor of doctoral students, master's degree students and over hundred undergraduate students.
- Member of the Strategic Council for Foreign Affairs at the Ministry of Foreign Affairs.
- Vice-President of the Slovenian Red Cross.
- President of the Slovenian Chess Association.
