= Matjaž Nemec =

Slovenian politician

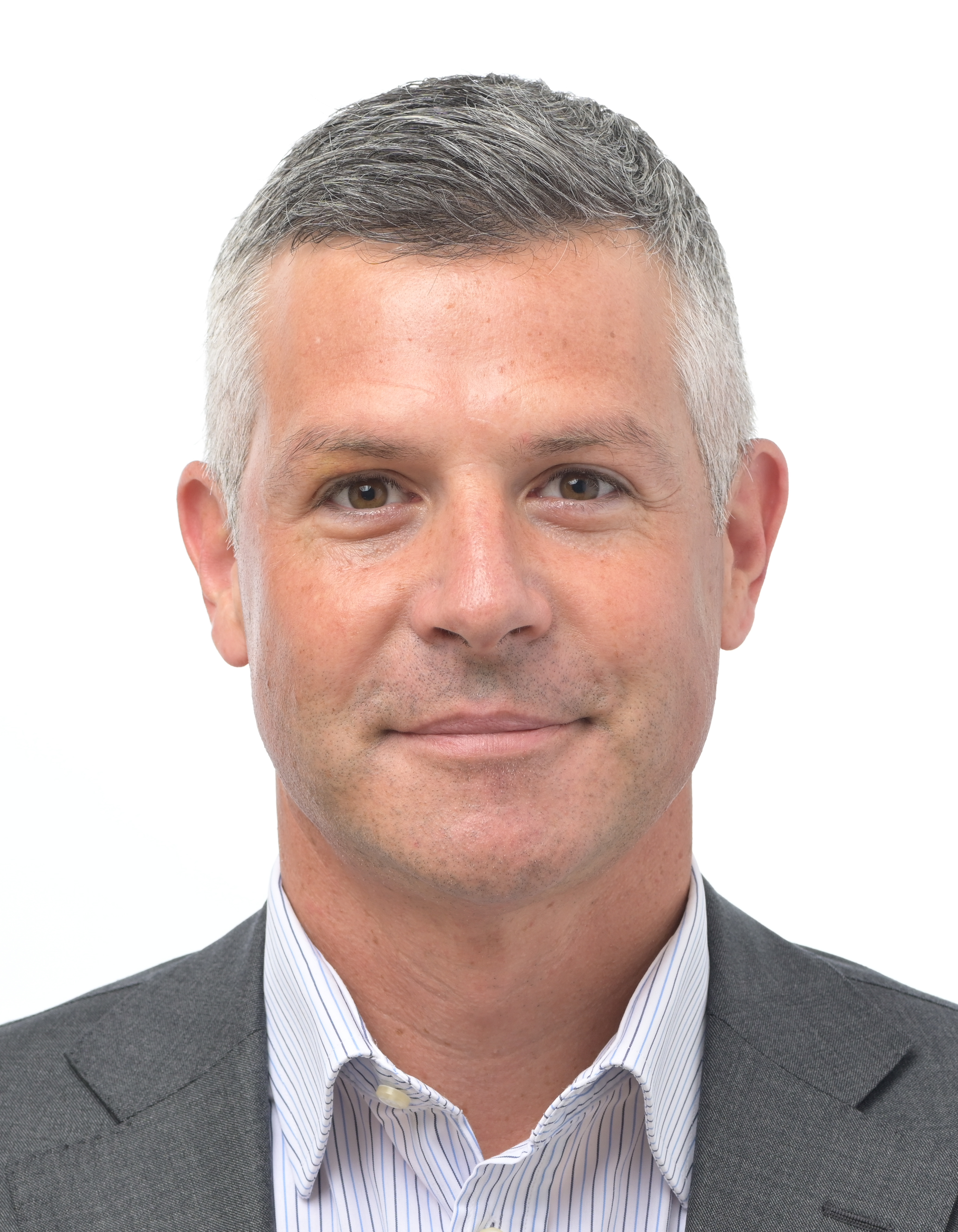
- Official portrait, 2024

Member of the European Parliament
- Incumbent
- Assumed office 18 May 2022
- Preceded by: Tanja Fajon

Member of the National Assembly
- In office 1 August 2014 – 13 May 2022

Personal details
- Born: 10 April 1980 (age 46) Nova Gorica, Slovenia, Yugoslavia
- Party: Slovenia: Social Democrats; EU: S&D

Matjaž Nemec (born 10 April 1980), is a Slovenian politician, who is currently a member of the European Parliament since 18 May 2022.

Between 2014 and 2022, Nemec was a member of the National Assembly of Slovenia from the Social Democrats party. During the 7th National Assembly, he was also its vice-president. Before being elected as a Member of Parliament, he worked as an assistant to the President of Slovenia, Borut Pahor.

== Biography ==
Matjaž Nemec was born in Nova Gorica on 10 April 1980.

He studied at CDI Univerzum and graduated in 2007. Until 2008, he worked as a salesman.

Nemec is an activist of the Slovenian Social Democrats. From 2008 to 2011, he was the personal secretary of Prime Minister Borut Pahor. In 2012, he employed in the administration of the Slovenian government as an analyst. In the same year as Borut Pahor took office, Nemec was nominated as his assistant.

In 2013, he graduated from IBS mednarodna poslovna šola Ljubljana, and in 2017, at the same university, he obtained a master's degree in international business and sustainable development.

In the 2014 National Assembly elections, Nemec ran in the electoral district Nova Gorica I. He won the parliamentary mandate with 1,467 or 11.13% of the votes. He was also elected as one of the vice-presidents of the National Assembly of Slovenia.

In 2017, when he was the vice-president of the National Assembly, Nemec described Croatia as "a geographically and politically peripheral country of the European Union, which belongs together with Bulgaria and Romania." He added that even the Visegrád Group does not want Croatia and that "it is a peripheral country also in relation to human rights." The statement was followed by a stormy reaction from the Croatian media, Jutranji.hr and Global wrote that the Social Democrats "became the leading nationalist party, worse than the right-wing nationalists."

In 2018, at the electoral district Nova Gorica II, he was re-elected as a member of the National Assembly of Slovenia, with 2,324 votes or 18.25% of the votes.

He was a member of the following working bodies:

- Commission for Oversight of Intelligence and Security Services (chairman)
- Committee for Culture (member)
- Committee on Foreign Policy (member, formerly chairman)
- Commission of Inquiry on the determination of abuses and uneconomic behavior in the BATB (deputy member)

He ran for a new parliamentary mandate in the 2022 parliamentary elections, but did not win the election.

In the 2022 National Assembly elections, the then MEP Tanja Fajon was elected as a member of the National Assembly of the Slovenia, and later as Minister of Foreign Affairs. According to the results of the 2019 European elections, Nemec thus became an alternate MEP. The National Assembly confirmed his mandate on 18 May 2022.

In July 2025, Nemec provided the lone vote from the S&D group in favour of the censure motion against the von der Leyen Commission II over Pfizergate.

== Personal life ==
=== Family ===
He divorced his first wife, Iryna Osypenko, a Ukrainian model. In May 2021, he and his partner Nina Tršelič has a son, Maj.
