= New Slovenia =

Conservative political party in Slovenia

New Slovenia – Christian Democrats Nova Slovenija – Krščanski demokrati
- Leader: Jernej Vrtovec
- Founded: 4 August 2000
- Split from: SLS+SKD
- Headquarters: Ljubljana
- Youth wing: Young Slovenia
- Membership (2024): 8,000
- Ideology: Christian democracy; Conservatism
- Political position: Centre-right
- National affiliation: Skupaj v Akcijo
- European affiliation: European People's Party
- European Parliament group: European People's Party Group
- International affiliation: Centrist Democrat International
- Colours: Blue
- National Assembly: 7 / 90
- European Parliament (Slovenian seats): 1 / 9
- Mayors: 5 / 212
- Municipal council: 278 / 2,750

Website
- nsi.si

New Slovenia – Christian Democrats (Slovene: Nova Slovenija – Krščanski demokrati, NSi) is a Christian democratic and conservative political party in Slovenia. Since 2025, it is led by Jernej Vrtovec. The party was formed on 4 August 2000 following a split in the unified Slovenian People's Party and Slovene Christian Democrats (SLS+SKD). NSi is a member of the European People's Party (EPP) and in the European Parliament its MEP Matej Tonin sits with the European People's Party Group.

Following the 2026 Slovenian parliamentary election, NSi is in the government supporting Janez Janša.

== History ==
=== Establishment ===
In July 2000, Andrej Bajuk, by the time Prime Minister of a centre-right coalition government, and other centrist Christian democrats disagreed with the rest of the Slovenian People's Party (SLS+SKD) over the question of a new electoral system. While Bajuk wanted the National Assembly to abandon proportional representation, the SLS+SKD party voted against any changes. Therefore, Bajuk retired from the party and created New Slovenia as his Prime Ministerial vehicle. Other former members of the Slovene Christian Democrats opposed to the merger of SKD and SLS, followed the foundation appeal. In the October 2000 parliamentary election, the new party won 8.6% of the vote and eight seats. Thereupon, Bajuk resigned as Prime Minister and New Slovenia went into opposition.

=== Since 2004 ===
From 2004 to 2008, New Slovenia was part of the 8th Government of Slovenia, a centre-right coalition led by Prime Minister Janez Janša of the Slovenian Democratic Party (SDS).

The first European Parliament election with Slovenian participation in 2004 was won by New Slovenia which received 24% of the votes and secured two of the seven Slovenian seats.

At the 2008 legislative elections, the party won only 3.4% of the popular vote and did not win any seats in the 90-seat National Assembly. After the elective failure of 2008, Bajuk announced his immediate resignation and retirement from politics. Ljudmila Novak succeeded him as party president.

At the 2011 Slovenian parliamentary election on 4 December 2011, it won 4.9% of votes, thus gaining four seats in the National Assembly.

In the 2014 European election, NSi ran in a joint electoral list with the Slovenian People's Party, which received 16.6% of the vote and came in second place, returning 2 MEPs.

The party received 5.5% of the vote in the Slovenian parliamentary election on 13 July 2014, and won five seats in parliament.

At the 2018 Parliamentary election, NSi received 7.2% of electoral votes, which resulted in seven parliamentary seats. The party was in opposition until March 2020, when it entered a centre-right coalition with the SDS, Modern Centre Party and Democratic Party of Pensioners of Slovenia.

NSi's Ljudmila Novak was elected as one of eight MEPs of Slovenia at the 2019 European election.

In the 2022 parliamentary election, NSi secured 6.9% of the vote, gaining eight seats in the National Assembly. It is currently in opposition.

== Ideology ==
New Slovenia has taken a Christian conservative position on some issues, advocating traditional social values and defending the position of the Catholic Church on moral questions. The party is based on social conservatism, and had been opposed to same-sex marriage and adoption by same sex couples. However, it voted in favor of legislation that granted limited rights to registered same-sex partnerships, which was superseded in 2022 with the country’s legalization of gay marriage.

Its economic platform is broadly liberal, while championing a social market economy. It is a pro-European party. In 2019, party leader Matej Tonin announced that the party would reposition itself in the political centre while refreshing its programme, reiterating its stated commitment to social market economy.

== Young Slovenia ==
Young Slovenia (Slovene: Mlada Slovenija, MSI) is the youth wing of the Nova Slovenija party. It is a youth organization that promotes and prepares young people for active participation in society based on the values of Christian democracy and advocates for the interests of young people. It brings together young people aged 15 to 32. It is a member of the Slovenian Youth Council (MSS) and, at the international level, a full member of YEPP (the youth wing of the European People's Party) and Junge Alpenregion. Young Slovenia was founded on 21 April 2001. Its most notable action has been the initiative to assess the constitutionality of the proposal to name a street after Josip Broz – Tito. On 4 October 2011, the Constitutional Court ruled that the decision of the Urban Municipality of Ljubljana to name a street after Tito was unconstitutional and violated the principle of respect for human dignity.

== Election results ==
=== National Assembly ===
Election	Leader	Votes	%	Seats	+/–	Status
2000	Andrej Bajuk	93,247	8.66 (#6)	8 / 90	▲8	Opposition
2004	Andrej Bajuk	88,073	9.09 (#4)	9 / 90	▲1	Coalition
2008	Andrej Bajuk	35,774	3.40 (#8)	0 / 90	▼9	Extra-parliamentary
2011	Ljudmila Novak	53,758	4.88 (#7)	4 / 90	▲4	Coalition 2012–13
2011	Ljudmila Novak	53,758	4.88 (#7)	4 / 90	▲4	Opposition 2013–14
2014	Ljudmila Novak	48,846	5.59 (#6)	5 / 90	▲1	Opposition
2018	Matej Tonin	63,792	7.16 (#6)	7 / 90	▲2	Opposition 2018–20
2018	Matej Tonin	63,792	7.16 (#6)	7 / 90	▲2	Coalition 2020–22
2022	Matej Tonin	81,794	6.86 (#3)	8 / 90	▲1	Opposition
2026 (Note: Run in a joint list with SLS and Fokus)	Jernej Vrtovec	109,201	9.26 (#3)	7 / 90	▼1	Coalition

=== European Parliament ===
Election	List leader	Votes	%	Seats	+/–	EP Group
2004	Lojze Peterle	123,563	23.57 (#1)	2 / 7	New	EPP-ED
2009	Lojze Peterle	76,866	16.58 (#3)	1 / 8	▼1	EPP
2014 (Note: Run in a joint list with SLS.)	Lojze Peterle	66,760	16.60 (#2)	1 / 8	0	EPP
2019	Ljudmila Novak	53,621	11.12 (#4)	1 / 8	0	EPP
2024	Matej Tonin	51,277	7.59 (#5)	1 / 9	0	EPP

=== Presidential ===
Election	Candidate	1st round		2nd round		Result
Election	Candidate	Votes	%	Votes	%	Result
2017	Ljudmila Novak	54,437	7.24			Lost
2022	Janez Cigler Kralj	38,113	4.37			Lost

== Prominent members ==
- Andrej Bajuk (deceased in 2011)
- Lojze Peterle
- Ljudmila Novak
- Lovro Šturm
- Jure Zupan
- Mojca Kucler Dolinar
- Janez Drobnič (left the party in 2008)
- Andrej Capuder
- Matej Tonin
