= Romana Tomc =

Slovenian politician

Romana Tomc MEP
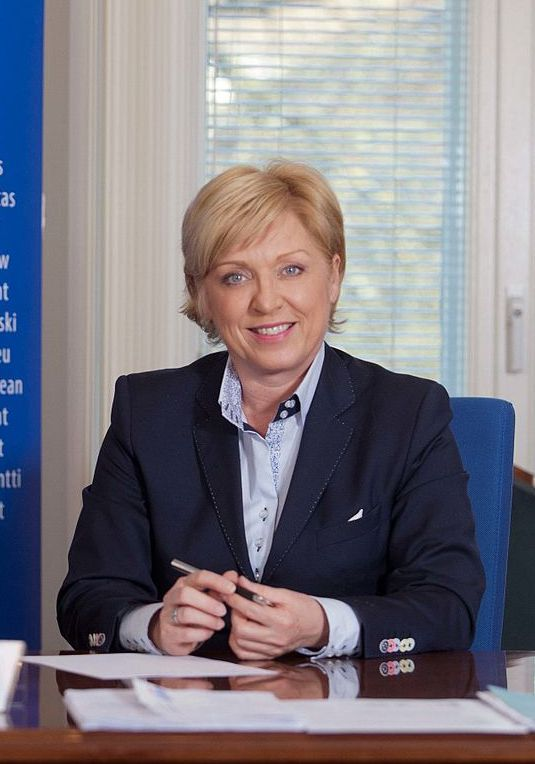

Vice-Chair of the European People's Party in the European Parliament
- Incumbent
- Assumed office 19 June 2024
- Chair: Manfred Weber
- Serving alongside: François-Xavier Bellamy; Andrzej Halicki; Jeroen Lenaers; Dolors Montserrat; Siegfried Mureșan; Lídia Pereira; Massimiliano Salini; Tomas Tobé; Željana Zovko
- Preceded by: See list: Arnaud Danjean; Frances Fitzgerald; Rasa Juknevičienė; Jeroen Lenaers; Vangelis Meimarakis; Dolors Montserrat; Siegfried Mureşan; Jan Olbrycht; Željana Zovko; Lídia Pereira

Member of the European Parliament
- Incumbent
- Assumed office 1 July 2014
- Constituency: Slovenia

Member of the National Assembly
- In office 21 December 2011 – 30 June 2014

Personal details
- Born: 2 November 1965 (age 60) Ljubljana, Slovenia
- Party: Slovenian Democratic Party
- Other political affiliations: European People's Party
- Website: www.romanatomc.si

Romana Tomc (born 2 November 1965) is a Slovenian politician and dignitarie and Member of the European Parliament (MEP) from Slovenia. She is a member of the Slovenian Democratic Party, part of the European People's Party.

== Political career ==
Tomc has been a Member of the European Parliament since the 2014 elections. In parliament, she has since been serving on the Committee on Employment and Social Affairs.

In addition to her committee assignments, Tomc is part of the parliament's delegation for Northern cooperation and for relations with Switzerland and Norway and to the EU-Iceland Joint Parliamentary Committee and the European Economic Area (EEA) Joint Parliamentary Committee. She is also a supporter of the MEP Alliance for Mental Health and the MEPs Against Cancer group.

On the national level, Tomc was the candidate of the Slovenian Democratic Party (SDS) in the 22 October 2017 presidential election, challenging incumbent Borut Pahor.

== Recognition ==
In December 2020, Tomc received the Employment, Social Affairs and Regions award at The Parliament Magazine's annual MEP Awards.
