= List of Marjan Šarec =

Political party in Slovenia

List of Marjan Šarec Lista Marjana Šarca
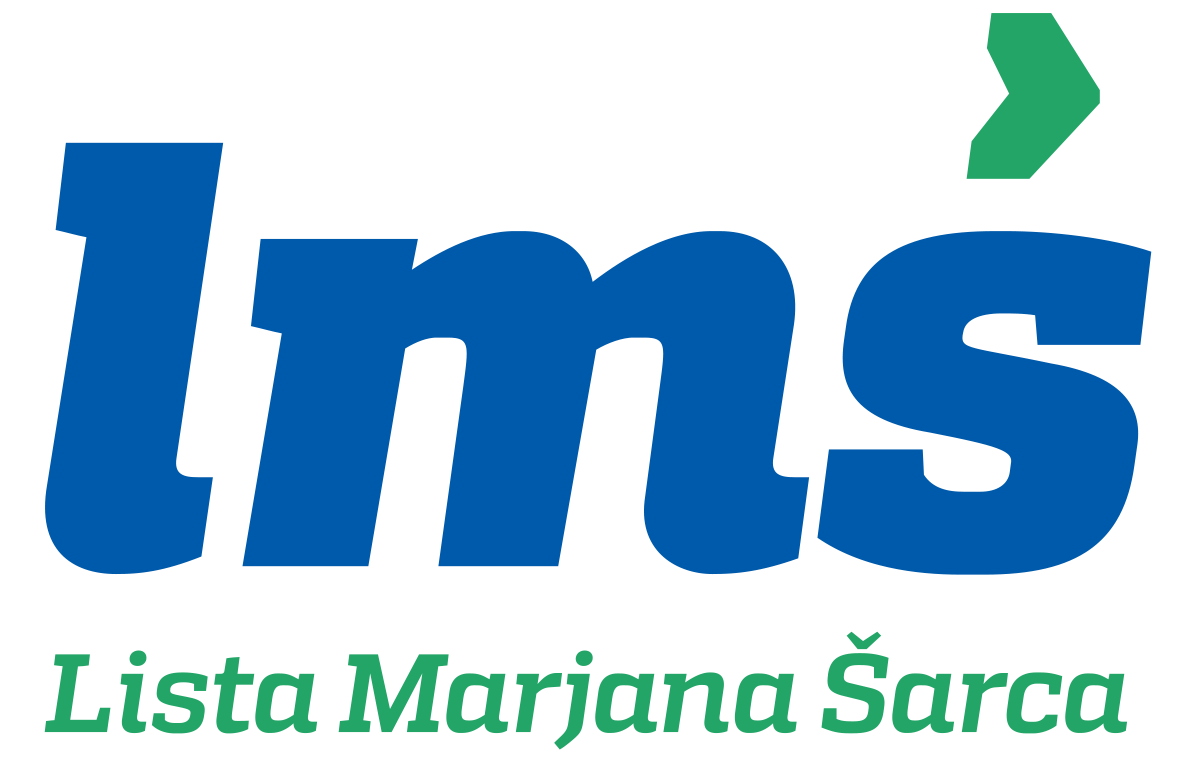
- President: Marjan Šarec
- Secretary-General: Janja Zorman Macura
- Founded: 31 May 2014
- Dissolved: 27 June 2022
- Merged into: Freedom Movement
- Membership (2018): cca. 300
- Ideology: Social liberalism Populism
- Political position: Centre to centre-left
- European affiliation: Alliance of Liberals and Democrats for Europe
- European Parliament group: Renew Europe (2019–2022)

Website
- www.sarec.si/

The List of Marjan Šarec (Slovene: Lista Marjana Šarca, LMŠ) was a political party in Slovenia led by former Prime Minister Marjan Šarec. The LMŠ was the lead party in the Šarec government from September 2018 to March 2020. The party merged into the Freedom Movement in the aftermath of the 2022 elections, in which it lost all of its parliamentary representation.

== History ==
Marjan Šarec, a former journalist, actor, and comedian, founded the party (initially as List of Marjan Šarec – Onward Kamnik) during his first mayoral term to contest the 2014 Slovenian Local Elections providing candidates for the municipal council of Kamnik. For most of Šarec's second term as mayor of Kamnik, the party was active only at the local level.

Šarec contested the 2017 presidential election, advancing to the runoff but narrowly losing to incumbent President Borut Pahor. After announcing his much speculated entry into parliamentary politics, LMŠ swiftly topped public opinion polls, emerging as the foremost party leading into the 2018 Slovenian parliamentary election.

In an interview with the weekly political magazine Mladina, Šarec argued against comparisons of LMŠ with Mayor Zoran Janković's Positive Slovenia and incumbent PM Miro Cerar's Modern Centre Party (SMC) which both emerged as preeminent political forces after being established just months prior to parliamentary elections. He has spoken out in favour of judicial, regulatory, procedural, and electoral reforms (including the introduction of preferential voting, and raising the parliamentary threshold to achieve more stable governments), rectifying the inefficient healthcare system, and doing more to address climate change (including an expansion of the Krško Nuclear Power Plant). He has also expressed opposition to privatising infrastructural and strategic firms (and the complete privatisation of the banking sector), argued in favour of running a balanced budget and reducing the public debt (if this was allowed for by future economic growth), and reform of the pension system, including by promoting private pension schemes. He has stated the party will be willing to politically cooperate with anyone, except for "people who are involved in any suspicious deals". The party has expressed support for the complete legalisation of cannabis.

On his electoral website, Šarec listed advocacy for public education and healthcare, environmental responsibility, intergenerational cooperation, transparency and meritocracy, and research and development as some of the integral components of his political vision. He also declared his unwavering support for abortion rights, called for tolerance of homosexuality, and linked true socialism with the social teachings of Jesus Christ.

The party received 12.6% of the vote in the 2018 parliamentary election held on 3 June 2018, winning 13 seats in parliament. The party became the largest component of the Šarec government formed on 13 September 2018, in coalition with the SMC, Social Democrats, Party of Alenka Bratušek and Democratic Party of Pensioners of Slovenia.

The LMS joined the Alliance of Liberals and Democrats for Europe Party on 9 November 2018.

In the 2019 European election held on 26 May 2019, the LMS came in third place nationally, receiving 15.6% of the vote and electing two MEPs to the Renew Europe European Parliament group. In the 2022 election the party won just 3.72% of the vote and did not elect any MPs to the National Assembly. It subsequently dissolved and joined the Freedom Movement, the social-liberal party of Prime Minister Robert Golob.

It has been described as a valence populist party.

== Electoral results ==
=== National Assembly ===
Election	Leader	Votes	%	Seats	+/–	Government
2018	Marjan Šarec	112,250	12.60 (#2)	13 / 90	▲13	Government 2018–20
2018	Marjan Šarec	112,250	12.60 (#2)	13 / 90	▲13	Opposition 2020–22
2022	Marjan Šarec	44,401	3.72 (#6)	0 / 90	▼13	Extra-parliamentary; Government

=== European Parliament ===
Election	Leader	Votes	%	Seats	+/–
2019	Irena Joveva	73,480	15.6 (#3)	2 / 8	▲2

=== Presidential ===
Election	Candidate	1st round		2nd round		Result
Election	Candidate	Votes	%	Votes	%	Result
2017	Marjan Šarec	186,235	24.76	334,239	46.91	Lost
