= Ljudmila Novak =

Slovenian politician (born 1959)

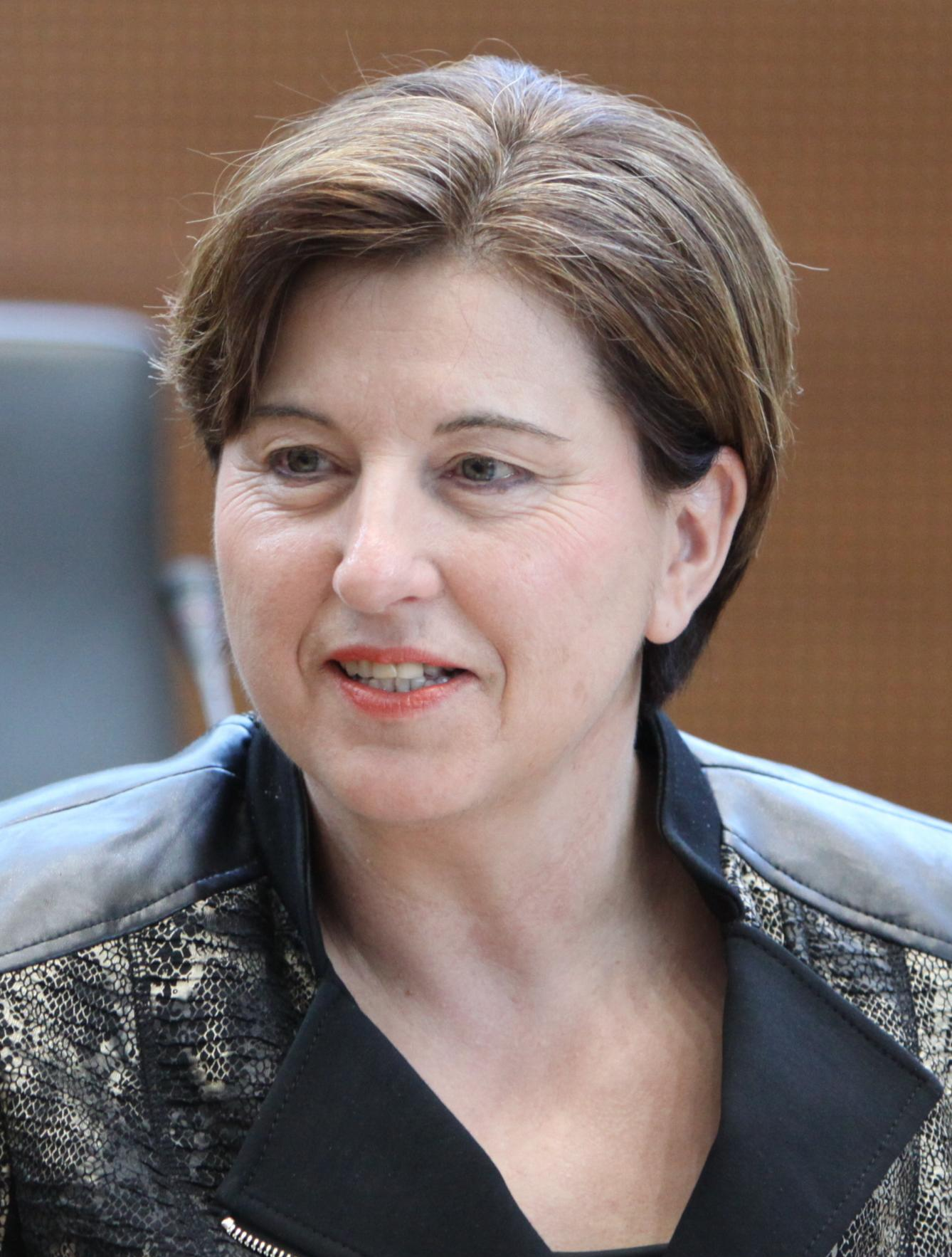

Deputy Prime Minister of Slovenia
- In office 10 February 2012 – 20 March 2013

Minister Without Portfolio for the Slovenian Diaspora
- In office 10 February 2012 – 20 March 2013

Deputy-Speaker of the National Assembly
- In office 21 December 2011 – 10 February 2012

Member of the National Assembly for Ljubljana Bežigrad
- Incumbent
- Assumed office 21 December 2011

Member of the European Parliament for Slovenia
- In office 20 July 2004 – 30 July 2009

Leader of New Slovenia
- In office 15 November 2008 – 31 January 2018

Mayor of Moravče
- In office 1 December 2002 – 22 October 2006
- Incumbent
- Assumed office 1 July 2019

Personal details
- Born: 1 August 1959 (age 67) Maribor, Yugoslavia (now Slovenia)
- Party: New Slovenia
- Education: University of Maribor

Ljudmila Novak (born 1 August 1959) is a Slovenian politician and a Member of the European Parliament. She is the president of the New Slovenia – Christian People's Party. Since 21 December 2011, she has been the vice-president of the Slovenian National Assembly.

== Early life and career ==
Novak was born in Maribor. She studied Slovene and German language at the University of Maribor. Between 1982 and 2001, she worked as a school teacher, first in Murska Sobota, and then in Višnja Gora and finally in Moravče.

== Political career ==
Novak entered politics in 2001, when she was elected mayor of Moravče. In 2002, she became a member of the Executive Council of New Slovenia party. In 2004, she was elected to the European Parliament. As a member of the European People's Party, she was named a member of the Committee on Culture and Education. In 2022, she joined the Committee of Inquiry to investigate the use of Pegasus and equivalent surveillance spyware. She is also a substitute for the Committee on Regional Development, a member of the delegation to the ACP-EU Joint Parliamentary Assembly and a substitute for the delegation for relations with Mercosur.

After the Slovenian parliamentary election of 2008, when New Slovenia failed to gain any seats in the National Assembly (NA), the lower house of the Slovenian parliament, Novak was elected president of the party. At the 2011 Slovenian parliamentary election, the party won 4 seats in the NA.

She learned and practiced the language Esperanto in her youth, but she does not actively speak it today. She still understands it. In 2007 she participated in the 7th congress of the European Esperanto Union in Maribor, Slovenia. On 21 January 2009, she presented to the European Parliament in the Committee of Culture (under the sign PE 416.668v01-00) in the framework of the debate/opinion on multilingualism of Vasco Graça Moura three proposals for change in article 4, touching on Esperanto.

Party political offices
Preceded by Andrej Bajuk	President of New Slovenia; 2008–2018	Incumbent
