= National Security Council (Slovenia) =

National Security Council Svet za nacionalno varnost

Agency overview
- Agency executives: Robert Golob, Prime Minister (chairman); Vojko Volk, National Security Adviser Secretary of the National Security Council
- Parent department: Government of the Republic of Slovenia
- Child agency: Secretariat of the Council

The National Security Council (Slovene: Svet za nacionalno varnost) is the advisory and coordinating body of the Government for national defence, security system, emergency response system and other issues of national security. Prime Minister is ex officio president of the council.

In the case of war or emergency, the Council becomes National Executive Staff of Defence (Slovenian: Državni operativni štab za obrambo).

National Centre for Crisis Management of the Republic of Slovenia (within Ministry of Defence) provides administrative and technical support for the council, Secretariat and Secretariat Executive Group.

== Members ==
On 16 March 2020 14th Government changed Decree on National Security Council (Odlok o Svetu za nacionalno varnost) and excluded Director of Slovenian Intelligence and Security Agency from the council. Ministers of Defence, Infrastructure, Justice are no longer members ex officio. Deputy Prime Minister are now members ex officio. Even though Minister of Defence is no longer member of the council, current minister Matej Tonin is member as he is also a Deputy Prime Minister. Composition of the Secretariat changed as well. State secretaries in the ministries of the Interior, Defence, Finance, Justice and Infrastructure, Director of the Information Security Administration, Director of the Government Office for the Protection of Classified Information, Director of the Government Office of Legislation and national coordinators for the Prevention of Terrorism and Violent Extremism and for the Prevention of Radicalization are no longer members. Secretariat Executive Group was abolished as well.

Member	Current holder
Prime Minister (President of the council)	Robert Golob
Minister of Defence	Marjan Šarec
Minister of the Interior	Boštjan Poklukar
Minister of Foreign Affairs	Tanja Fajon
Minister of Infrastructure	Alenka Bratušek
Director of the Slovene Intelligence and Security Agency	Joško Kadivnik
Can be invited by the President of the Council
President of the Republic	Nataša Pirc Musar
President of the National Assembly	Urška Klakočar Zupančič
President of the National Council	Alojz Kovšca
Representative of the largest opposition party	Janez Janša (SDS)
Chiefs of other state bodies and organizations
Other ministers, representatives of other state bodies, and national security experts

=== Secretariat of the Council ===
Secretariat coordinates actions of the council and preparations for its sessions.

Member	Current holder
State Secretary and National Security Adviser to the Prime Minister (Head); Secretary of the National Security Council	Vojko Volk
Director of the Slovene Intelligence and Security Agency Deputy Secretary of the National Security Council	Joško Kadivnik
Secretary General of the Government of the Republic of Slovenia	Barbara Kolenko Helbl
State Secretary in the Ministry of Foreign Affairs	Marko Štucin or Sanja Štiglic
State Secretary in the Ministry of Defence	Damir Črnčec or Rudi Medved
State Secretary in the Ministry of the Interior	Tina Heferle or Helga Dobrin
State Secretary in the Ministry of Infrastructure	Andrej Rajh
Director of the Government Information Security Office	Uroš Svete
Director of the Government Communication Office	Petra Bezjak Cirman
Director General of Police	Senad Jušić
Chief of the General Staff of the Slovenian Army	Brig Gen Robert Glavaš
Director General of Intelligence and Security Service of the Ministry of Defence	Andrej Fefer
Commander of the Civil Defence	Srečko Šestan
