= Damir Črnčec =

Slovene politologist (born 1973)

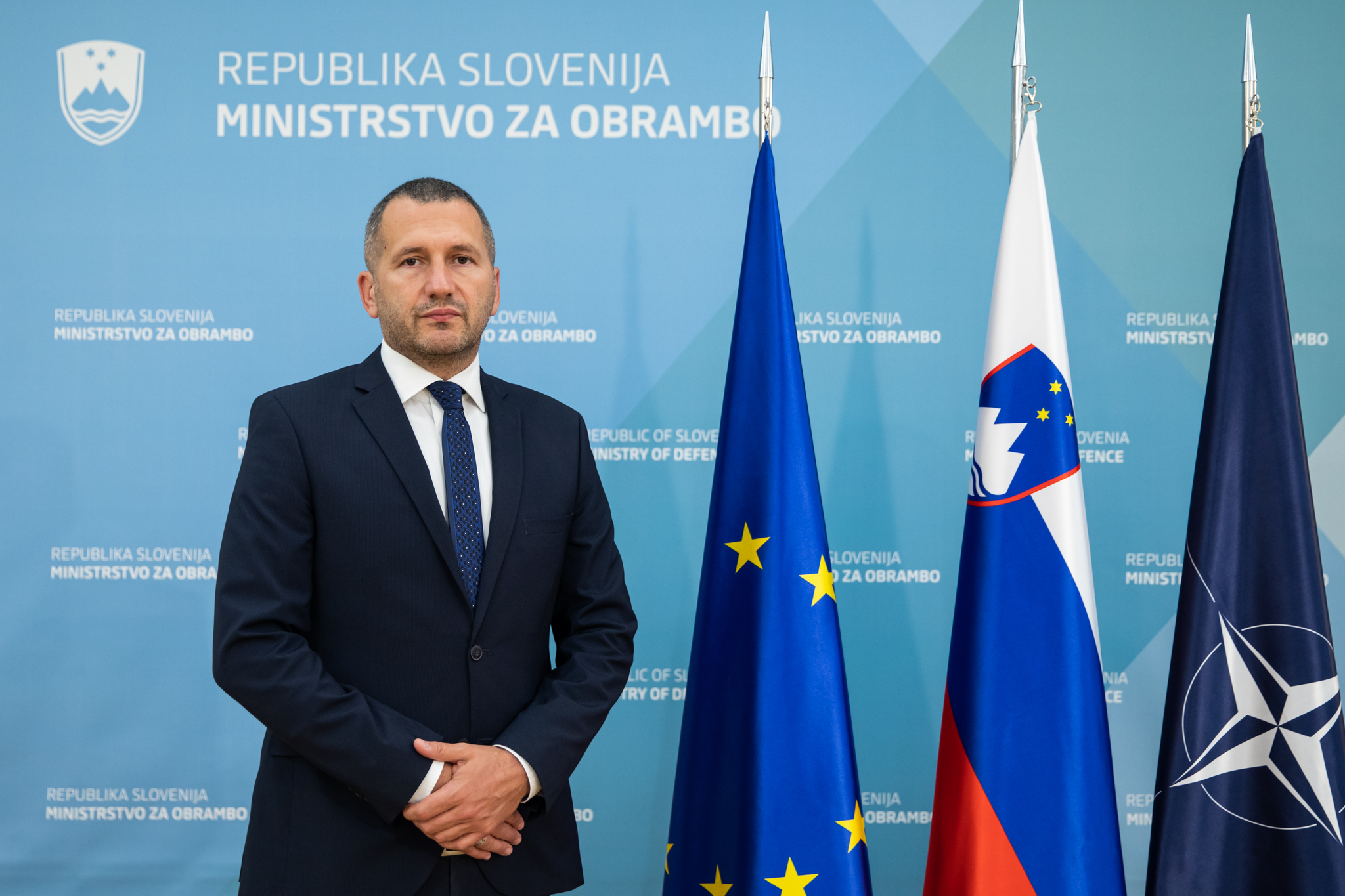
- Črnčec in 2022

State Secretary for Defense
- In office 1 June 2022 – 31 January 2025
- Prime Minister: Robert Golob
- Minister: Marjan Šarec, Borut Sajovic

State Secretary for National Security
- In office 14 September 2018 – 13 March 2020
- Prime Minister: Marjan Šarec
- Preceded by: Erik Kopač
- Succeeded by: Žan Mahnič

Personal details
- Born: 19 June 1973 (age 53) Maribor, Slovenia
- Education: University of Ljubljana

Damir Črnčec (born 19 June 1973 in Maribor) is a columnist, expert on security issues, university professor, and civil society activist.

== Professional career ==
In 1999 with age 26, he became the youngest contingent commander of the Slovenian Armed Forces abroad and was the commander of the first Slovenian unit that received a battle flag in another country. He took command of the 5th contingent of the Slovenian Armed Forces in Cyprus during the UNFICYP. Damir began his career as a Slovenian military officer after he finished the Reserve Officer Training School and the Officer Candidate School.

In 2005, he became the Director General of the Intelligence and Security Agency at the Ministry of Defence (OVS). In 2010, the government extended his mandate for another five years as the director of OVS. During his mandate, the Republic of Slovenia hosted a meeting of the Security Agencies from NATO.

From March 2015 until June 2016, he was a Defence Policy and Public Diplomacy Advisor to the Minister of Defence of Montenegro. He advised her on activities that were of key importance for NATO's decision on a membership invitation that was received on 2 December 2015, and for the signing of the accession protocol on 19 May 2016. During his term, Slovenia also ratified the protocol on 8 June 2016. From 2013 to February 2015 and since July 2016 and September 2018, he served as a Defence Policy Advisor to the Chief of the General Staff of the Slovenian Armed Forces. In February 2012 he was appointed as the Director of the Slovene Intelligence and Security Agency (SOVA) and in March 2013, he resigned just three days after the submission of the illegally kept archive of the communist secret police (UDBA). During that period, he was also the Slovenian Counterterrorism Coordinator and the Head of the Secretariat of the Security Council of the Republic of Slovenia.

From 14 September 2018 to 13 March 2020, he served as the National Security Advisor to Slovenian Prime Minister Marjan Šarec. During his tenure, he was also appointed as chief arbitration implementer between Slovenia and Croatia by the Government of Slovenia.

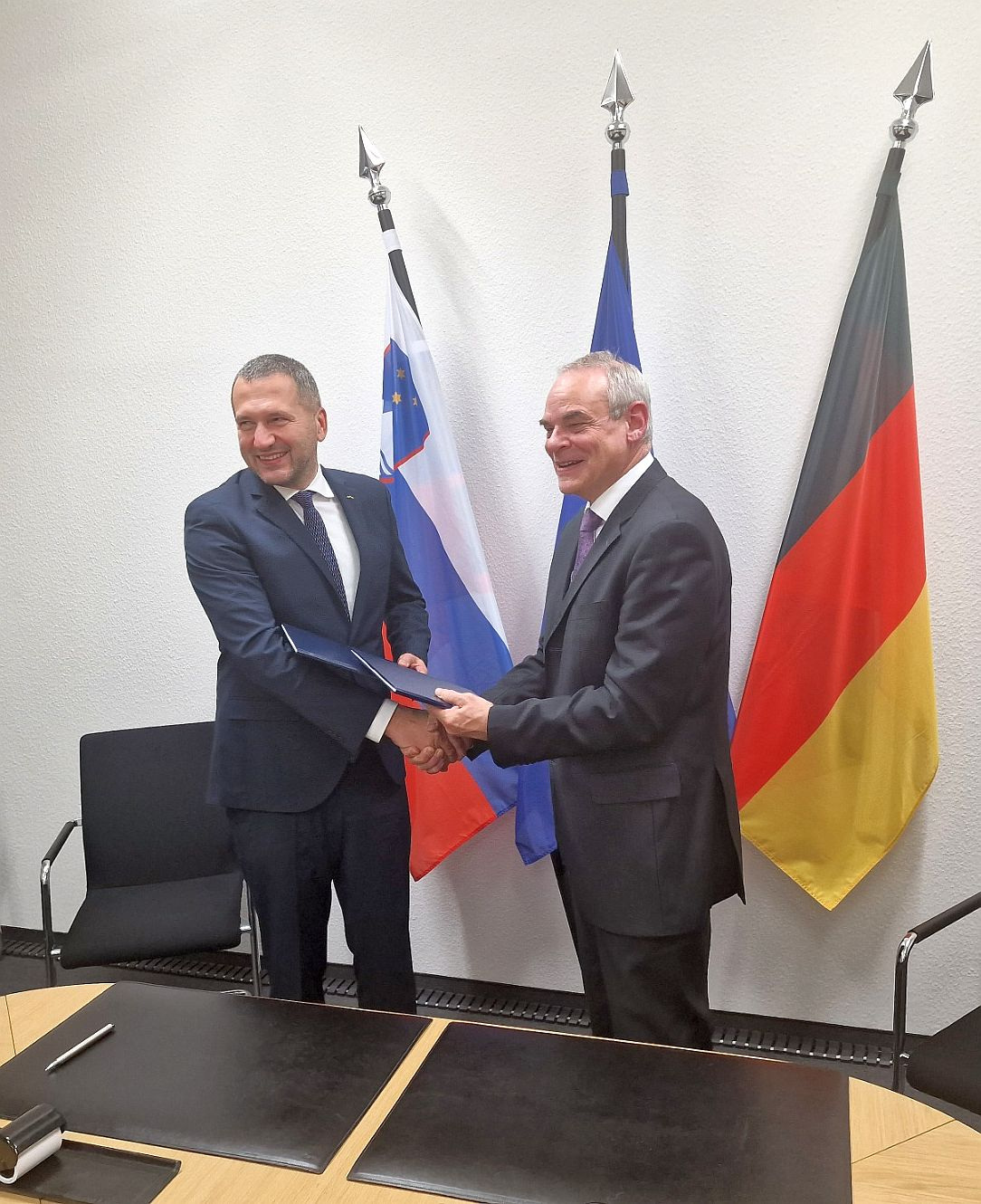
State Secretary of Defence Dr Damir Črnčec signs Programme Agreement with State Secretary of Federal Ministry of Defence (Germany) Benedikt Zimmer for the procurement of IRIS-T SLM air defence systems on 6 December 2023

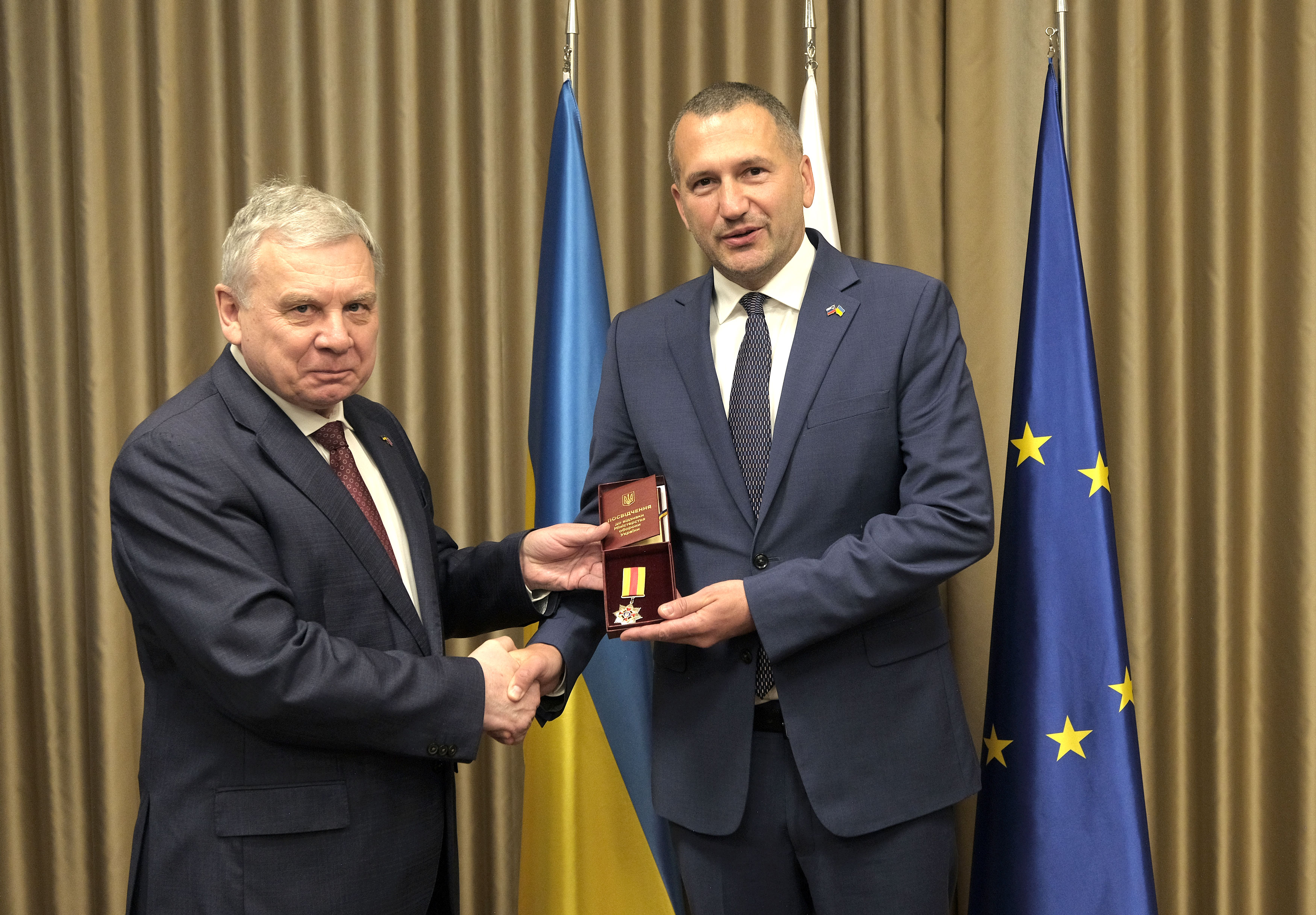
Damir Črnčec receiving Medal for Assistance from Ukrainian Ambassador to Slovenia Andriy Taran in Ljubljana, 19 May 2023

He was appointed to the position of State Secretary for Defence on June 1, 2022. As part of his duties, he signed a Programme Agreement with Germany on 6 December 2023 for the procurement of air defence systems, which includes the procurement of the IRIS-T SLM systems.

He is the recipient of numerous medals and awards. In 2023, he received the Medal of Assistance to the Armed Forces of Ukraine for his personal contribution to the development of the Armed Forces of Ukraine and fruitful cooperation with the Ministry of Defence of Ukraine, in light of the Russian invasion of Ukraine.

Since September 2022, he has been serving on the Managing Board of ITF Enhancing Human Security, a humanitarian, non-profit organization that focuses on humanitarian de-mining, conventional weapons destruction, policy development, and other forms of post-conflict assistance, as a Representative of Slovenia. He has also been a member of the Executive Board of the Centre for European Perspective (CEP) since September 2022. The Centre contributes to regional stability and prosperity through developing and strengthening friendly relations with beneficiary countries and in achieving visibility of Slovenian know-how in the region.

Since February 1, 2025 he is the Assistant to the President of the Management Board for Corporate Security at the Slovenian Sovereign Holding. On September 1 of the same year, he also became the Chairman of the Supervisory Board of DOVOS, a company focused on defense, security, and resilience.

== Academic career ==
Črnčec is an associate professor at the Graduate School of Government and European Studies covering the areas of national and international security and intelligence. From October 2016 until September 2017, he was the Dean at the Graduate School of Government and European Studies. He is the long-time Head of the Chair for National and International Security Studies. He obtained his Ph.D. in political science at the University of Ljubljana in 2008. He has taken part in numerous courses in the field of national and international security in Slovenia and abroad, either as a student, lecturer or visiting professor at the George C. Marshall European Centre for Security Studies, Harvard University, National Intelligence University and University of Donja Gorica.

== Civic commitment ==
Črnčec is President of the Euro-Atlantic think-tank organization called the »Association for European Slovenia«, which is actively involved in various areas, such as the rule of law, democracy, European Union, NATO, human rights and fundamental freedoms. He is the Head of Council of the Institute for Global Governments - IGLU, which addresses the issues of global governments, rule of law, security sector reform, and democratization. In May 2014, the Association for European Slovenia, in cooperation with other civil society organizations, presented the 2014 May Declaration on the Prešeren Square in Ljubljana in front of 5,000 people.

After Janez Janša was sent to the Dob prison to begin serving his prison sentence on 20 June 2014, Črnčec was appointed as President of the Committee for Protection of Human Rights and Fundamental Freedoms which he led until 9 September 2015. The Committee 2014 has become the biggest Slovenian civil society movement which has, since then, continued to organize rallies in front of the Slovenian Supreme Court. The Committee 2014's activities under his presidency involve more than 70,000 Slovenian citizens. In January 2015, the Association for European Slovenia was one of the initiators of the petition for privatization and depoliticization of the Slovenian economy (Za privatizacijo), which brought together the members of the civic society wishing to resist attempts to stop the sale of Slovenian public undertakings. The petition was signed by about 12,000 people.

== Publicistic activity ==
Damir Črnčec is a former columnist of the weekly »Reporter« and a current columnist of Siol.net. His articles have been published also by the magazines »Revija Obramba« and »Slovenska vojska«, daily »Večer« and »Vijesti«, weekly »Demokracija«, and by »Slovenski Čas«, a monthly supplement to the weekly »Družina«. He is also the author of security literature about Euro-Atlantic integration of the Security Systems. At the TEDxFDV 2014 event he addressed the young audience with a lecture titled »Power of Young Leaders«. He participated as a moderator at a strategic forum 2BS 2015 in Budva, Montenegro. He is often invited to participate in TV and radio debates as a human rights activist, civil society activist or expert on global, geostrategic, geopolitic and security issues. He articulated his years-long publicistic experience in the book title »Kresovi«, which means Bonfires.

== Awards and decorations ==
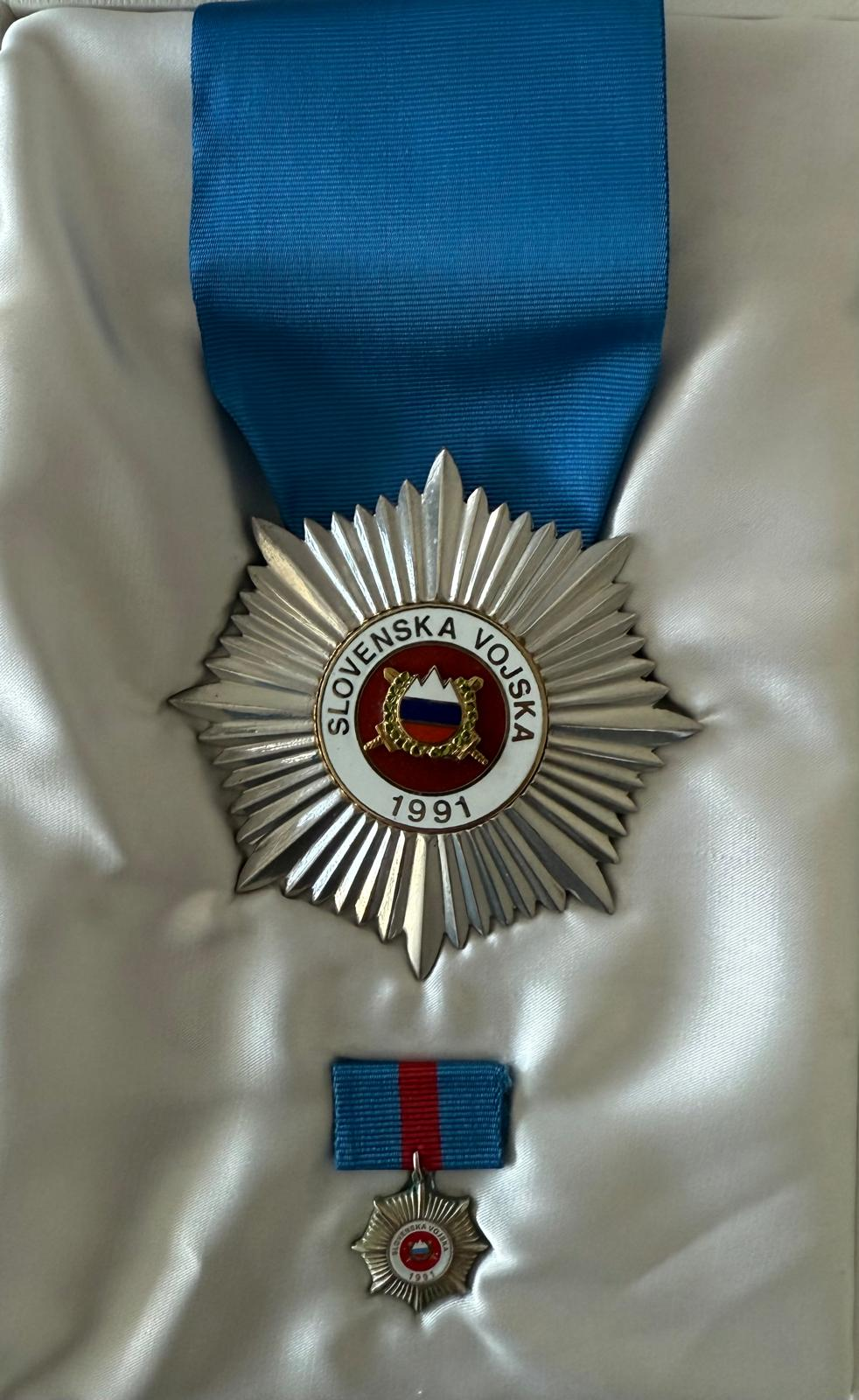
Order of the Slovenian Armed Forces on a sash

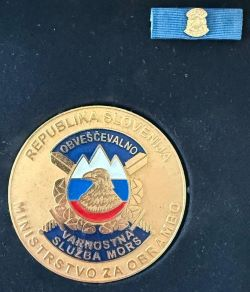
Golden Badge of Intelligence and Security Service at Ministry of Defence (Slovenia)

- Order of Slovenian Armed Forces on a sash
- Golden Badge of Intelligence and Security Service of MoD (Slovenia)
- Medal of Slovenian Armed Forces
- Medal of General Maister

UNFICYP Medal

Medal "For Assistance to the Armed Forces of Ukraine"
