= Far-right politics in Slovenia =

There are multiple groups and organisations within Slovenia which are or have been engaged in far-right political activity, and right-wing extremism. Their political activity has traditionally opposed and targeted socially progressive policies, and minorities (in particular; the LGBT community, and ethnic minorities like the Roma and immigrants (particularly those from the Southern Balkans), and espoused traditional ultraconservative and reactionary views and values. More recently, a rise in new, incipient alt-right groups has been noted, particularly as a reaction to the European migrant crisis.

== Overview ==
The far-right groups and subcultures in Slovenia have traditionally been largely impenetrable to uninitiated observers, existing in closed communities into which new members would need to be initiated, or "grandfathered", into. Their internal discussions have been said to take place mostly online, where the members revealed their "true faces", and where members arranged group events, while tamer discussions take place on Facebook.

=== Historical overview ===
During the 2000s, police statistics indicated a spike in "criminal acts involving public promotion of hatred, violence, or intolerance", with 5 incidents in the year 2000, up to 13 in 2005, and 19 in 2008.

On September 6, 2011, prime minister Borut Pahor was briefed by the head of the Slovenian Intelligence and Security Agency (SOVA) regarding the activities of extremist groups (in particular, Blood & Honour), which, according to the agency's assessment, presented a clear and present danger to national security.

Violent extremism nonetheless remains a relatively minor threat in Slovenia.

== Neo-Nazism and neo-Nazi groups ==
As of 2010, the most active neo-Nazi groups in Slovenia included: Blood & Honour (B & H), Headhunters Domžale, and Slovene Radicals. Neo-Nazi social activity has mostly centered in the cities of Domžale, and Žiri, where members own or have access to venues available for staging various group activities (including annual celebrations of Hitler's birthday). Neo-Nazis have also established cordial relations with their foreign counterparts, mainly those from neighbouring countries. Though neo-Nazi groups are not on the whole more common than in other countries and represent a relatively low security risk, the tolerant attitude of the authorities towards neo-Nazi-organised events has led to a boom in private neo-Nazi social gatherings such as parties and concerts; because such activities are not prohibited by law per se, Slovenia has become "a veritable Mecca for international activity and cooperation of extremists", according to a parliamentary investigative committee looking into the matter.

=== Blood & Honour ===
As of 2005, the Slovene B & H was operating a webpage (registered offshore to avoid domain seizure), promulgating neo-Nazi ideology. Their online activities have included compiling a list of Jewish residents of Slovenia. After the international B & H computer network was infiltrated by hackers and the data made available to the public, it was revealed that the Slovenian B & H faction was one of the most numerous and active, with membership comparable to that of Spain (which has a population 20 times that of Slovenia). B & H was active primarily in the central region of Slovenia, and generated revenue by staging concerts for their German counterparts. In October 2011 and November 2012, the Slovene branch celebrated its 10th and 11th anniversaries, respectively, with events in Domžale, and in Ljubljana (2011 only). Both events had attracted international attendance.

At least two members of B & H (including a leader of the Slovene B & H) were identified as members of the Slovenian Democratic Party youth wing. B & H members have also included Slovene army soldiers. B & H members have also been known to have attended SDS events on multiple occasions, and to have met with high ranking SDS politicians.

In September 2011, prime minister Borut Pahor was briefed by the head of the Slovenian Intelligence and Security Agency (SOVA), which assessed that extremist groups – Blood & Honour, in particular – presented a clear and present danger to national security. B & H members allegedly received training by members of the Slovene armed forces (including by ranking members) on an army training area and with advanced weaponry, borrowed army weaponry (a rocket launcher), attempted to purchase handguns, pressured detectives and individual politicians, were involved in direct correspondence with Norwegian terrorist and mass murderer Anders Breivik by both mail and e-mail, with multiple B & H members receiving his manifesto before Breivik's killing spree, and were allegedly intimately implicated in orchestrating the violent riots which took place amid the 2012–13 Slovenian protests (the organised group of violent agitators that disrupted a major protest in Ljubljana was also suspected of having been trained, hired, and compensated, possibly by a political party, according to police sources).

A police officer who served as bodyguard to Slovene prime ministers Janez Janša and Borut Pahor was found to be a close acquaintance of the leading members of the Slovene B & H. The individual was also an observing member ("sympathiser") of SDS.

SDS has been criticised for alleged links to Blood & Honour. The journalist who uncovered the links (Anuška Delić) was charged with leaking confidential information. The state intelligence agency, SOVA, headed by an SDS appointee at the time of the indictment, inadvertently confirmed allegations made by Delić by stating that the information revealed in the reports was consistent with findings of an ongoing investigation into the activities of the violent extremist group. SOVA argued that the information revealed in the reports could not have been obtained by any other means than by gaining access to information collected during the agency's covert investigations, and that the publication disrupted its efforts to monitor the group by alerting B & H of the monitoring efforts. Delić alleged the charges were "politically motivated".

== Far-right groups and organisations ==
=== Skinheads ===
Slovene skinheads were initially (at the close of the 1980s) – as was the case in other countries – mostly "beer drinkers, party-goers, fighters, sports fans, patriots, and anti-communists", before becoming an almost exclusively "Nazi and racist" subculture during the 90s. Skinheads became less publicly prominent and less violent during the 2000s, and mostly engaged in organising Nazi rock or "Oi!" concerts, and group events where members partook in various social and sports activities (e.g. air gun tournaments). Their subculture was rooted in interpersonal and social connections, with a distinct dichotomy between the younger, and older members (who were less political). While Nazism remained their core ideology, skinheads began to establish international contacts and connections, with their ideological focus shifting from ultra-nationalism to white nationalism, resulting in the rise of membership among Slovene skinheads in the Slovene chapter of Blood & Honour (a British-based group). Neo-Nazi groups conversely also gradually diversified their membership and shifted their image away from "Nazi skins" to expand their appeal.

=== Football hooligans ===
There is considerable overlap between Slovene sports fan groups or ultras and far-right political groups; football hooligans – particularly members of the Green Dragons (FC Ljubljana supporters), and Viole (FC Maribor supporters) are often involved in far-right political ideology and activity, and incidents of far-right political violence. Neo-Nazism began to take root in these fan groups after the year 2005. In 2016, both the GDs and Viole were sanctioned for displaying hateful symbols during a game, the former a "Slavic swastika", and the latter a Celtic cross.

=== Tukaj je Slovenija ===
Tukaj je Slovenija (literal translation: "Here Is Slovenija") was a far-right organisation that operated a popular now defunct far-right website and web forum (starting in October 2005). The group was particularly successful in recruiting youths, and especially active in the dissemination of its characteristic stickers. By 2007, the group was said to have "recently" disseminated 10,000 such stickers throughout the whole of Slovenia. The stickers even appeared in Croatia.

=== Autonomous Nationalists of Slovenia ===
The Autonomous Nationalists of Slovenia – the Slovene faction of the Autonome Nationalisten neo-Nazi groups constellation – were an alt-right group active during the early 2010s. The group operated a webpage and engaged in dissemination of posters and graffiti containing ideological propaganda. It focused on "defending the white race", espousing white nationalism, and xenophobia. The group also opposes "immigration, islamisation of Europe, homosexual families, alcohol and drug abuse, violence against animals [...] capitalism, liberalism, democracy, communism, and anarchy", abortion, and environmentalism. The group's communiqués featured a Celtic cross (which the group has adopted as its symbol) "embellished" with the White Pride World Wide motto.

Members of the group allegedly shouted "Down with the government, for Slovenia!" while performing the Nazi salute during a 2011 demonstration in front of the parliament building. The group disseminated posters opposing a new family law bill that was up for a referendum challenge in 2012. The posters variously included a picture of two male exhibitionists engaging in a sex act with the underlying message reading "UNACEPTABLE Would you leave your children's upbringing up to people like this? [...] Let's protect our children and not allow them to become 'playthings' of perverts. [...]", or a Nazi propaganda image portraying an "ideal" Aryan family while blaming "abortions and same-sex partnerships" for a low birth rate and alleged poor health of the nation. The Slovene Autonomous Nationalists were suspected of also having been intimately involved in orchestrating the violent disruption and subsequent riot during a 2012 Ljubljana protest (the Autonomous Nationalist groups are characteristed by their embrace of black bloc protest tactics more typically associated with violent far-left extremist protesters).

=== Radical Ljubljana ===
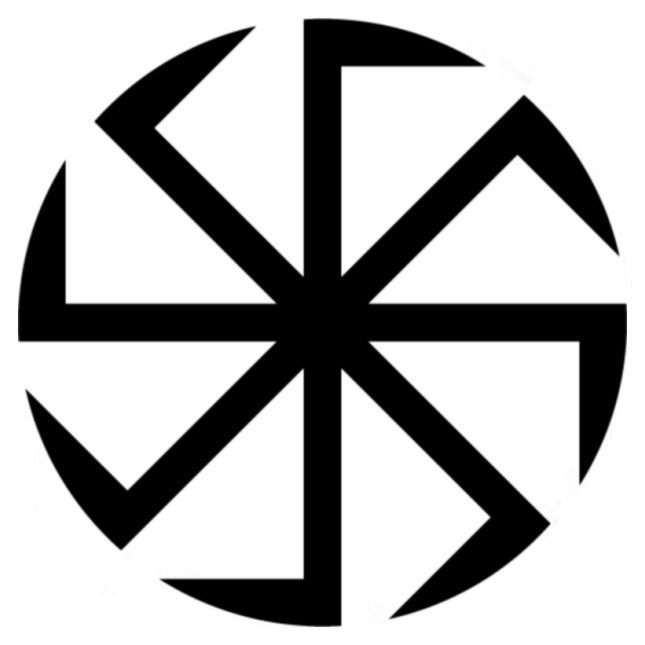
Kolovrat, or "Slavic swastika" (colloquial), the symbol adopted by Radical Ljubljana as the basis of their logo.

Radical Ljubljana was a "radical right" "urban nationalist" group espousing "Pan-Slavism" (towards which it evolved from a "pro-Germanic" ideology, according to representatives of the group), and opposed to "the LGBTQ community, the left, refugees, and immigrants". Its representative told the media that they desired to distance themselves from other far-right groups which they perceived as "neo-Nazis". Nonetheless, experts believe Radical Ljubljana still represents a "neo-fascist" and "neo-Nazi" group. The group is mostly involved in online political activity and drawing political graffiti. The group's Facebook site has rallied against "western liberals and Marxists" that finance "various degenerate movements and phenomena in Eastern Europe", and also contains instances of homophobia and anti-Semitism.

=== Generation Identity Slovenia ===
Activity of the Slovene branch of the far-right and alt-right Identitarian movement began to mount months prior to the 2018 Slovenian parliamentary election. The local branch – Generation Identity Slovenia – rallies against "migrants, homosexuals, liberals, globalists, Soros, and socialists". Information regarding the group – its leadership, membership, and internal structure – remains sparse. The group operates in Ljubljana, Maribor, and Velenje, and appears to share members with the two largest sports fan groups; Green Dragons, and Viole. The organisation also maintains close relations with counterparts in other countries, in particular, Austria (with Slovene members partaking in events of Austrian Identitarians). Past activities of the group have included propagation of political stickers, signs, and graffiti, photo-ops with political undertones or implicit messaging, and social media activity. The members of the Slovene branch have also attended protests (in particular; against LGBT rights, migrants, and the construction of a mosque), and camping excursions where members "bond in paramilitary training".

The Slovene Identitarian movement has fostered ties with the Slovenian Democratic Party. Individuals and media organisations associated with SDS have lauded the movement, and SDS members and politicians have co-attended events with, and shared social media posts of the movement. Observers have also noted that SDS leader Janez Janša adopted some of the rhetoric associated with the Identitarian movement in his speeches/public appearances. SDS organised a round table discussion about migrations in collaboration with GI.

Identitarian movement logo.

In late August 2018, Slovene Identitarians anonymously published a book; the "Manifesto for the Homeland". The work was published under the auspices of Nova Obzorja (Slovene for 'new horizons'), the SDS in-house publishing company. The book was also promoted by SDS-affiliated media organisations and individuals, including SDS leader Janez Janša, with SDS MP Žan Mahnič even going so far as to post on Twitter a photo of the book taken from his parliamentary seat, with the floor of the parliamentary chamber in the background. The book's foreword was written by Bernard Brščič, an "important SDS supporter" who has served as state secretary in the second Janša (SDS) cabinet and as chair of the party's think tank (Jože Pučnik Institute). Nova obzorja subsequently also published a second GI's book. GI was promoted by Nova24TV (a TV channel tied to SDS), which aired an ad for GI and its books during an interview with PM Janša.

=== Institute for Patriotic Values ===
The Institute for Patriotic Values was founded in late 2016 as an "institution which aims to develop and encourage patriotism and preserve heritage". It was co-founded by a local Slovenian Democratic Party official.

The institute organises social activities such as Krav Maga personal defense courses, and ceremonial wreath-laying on the grave of Rudolf Maister (a Slovene general and national hero). The institute also operates the "Rudolph Maister Division" which is "willing to go into battle against "the collaboration of left fascists antifa and radical Muslims"". According to Racist Extremism in Central & Eastern Europe, the Rudolph Maister Division was founded at the start of the 21. century by the neo-Nazi group Blood & Honour.

The Institute has also hosted political discussions; in late January 2018, it hosted a meeting with the representatives of the Slovenian Democratic Party (MP Branko Grims), Slovenian National Party, and Unified Slovenia (Andrej Šiško (also representing the Hervardi society)). During the meeting, Grims spoke out in favour of Trump, and against the "globalists", who are supposedly headed by "George Soros, but also the Rothschilds and other wealthy families of financial speculators", and whom Trump is said to be combating.

== Styrian Guard paramilitary ==
In early September 2018, photographs and videos of masked men - some armed with various weapons, and standing in military formation - surfaced on social media. Claims by the user who published the imagery that the armed group was Slovene were initially met with incredulity and scepticism, and led to speculation that the photos were of Russian or other foreign paramilitaries. However, the authenticity of the images was soon confirmed by Slovene politician Andrej Šiško, who could be seen leading the paramilitary formation.

The images and videos portray some 70 masked individuals who could be seen wearing black balaclavas and drab army green T-shirts embroidered with emblems. Many were also wearing camouflage bottoms. Attendants were seen wielding axes and firearms, including the Zastava M70 assault rifle (the possession of any such military-grade weaponry by civilians is illegal under Slovene law under all circumstances). The only one of the multitude not concealing his face was Šiško, who could be seen wearing his trademark bright red baseball cap.

Andrej Šiško is a fringe far-right politician who stood as presidential candidate during the 2017 Slovenian presidential election, winning 2.2% of the vote. His party, the Unified Slovenia Movement, gained only 0.6% of the vote in the 2018 Slovenian parliamentary election. While announcing his party's run in the 2018 parliamentary election, Šiško stated: "We are contending this election for one single reason: because this is the single and last attempt, I am saying this responsibly, to save the country in a peaceful manner. If this doesn't succeed even with the parliamentary election, we will have war in this country."

Šiško, a former leader of the Maribor sports supporters group Viole, has also headed the ultrapatriotic Hervardi society for over a decade and a half. Hervardi has been the dominant ultra-nationalist/traditionalist organisation in Maribor, largely stifling out various skinhead and neo-Nazi groups in the region. Hervardi was named after a military guard of the Old Slavic state Carantania. Šiško had already commandeered a volunteer militia during the brief Slovenian Independence War of the early 1990s. Hervardi had in the past also organised periodic get-togethers where members, clad semi-matching clothing (matching shirts and baseball caps embroidered with emblems, with participants many also wearing fatigue bottoms), engaged in group activities that included flag raising, and paintball tournaments. As one journalist put it in 2011, "Hervardi are otherwise also known for organising forest camps for the purpose of military training". Šiško has previously served a 2-year jail sentence for planting a car bomb.

Šiško confirmed to be the leader of the paramilitary group; Štajerska varda (Styrian guard). Šiško stated that the "Guard" was formed more than a year prior, is not associated with the political party he also heads, and numbers several hundred members. He stated that members do not keep the weapons at home, but said the group would not let itself be disarmed peacefully. Šiško acknowledged the possession of the arms may be illegal under Slovene law (the legitimacy of which he denies), and called on "natural law" to justify the carrying of weapons. He also declared his intention to form similar paramilitaries in other regions of the country, and that their members may soon number several thousand, at which point the situation may aggravate if he is not heeded.

Šiško said the guard was intended to "maintain order and peace, and control the borders", and would respond to "direct threats to our region, our homeland, our nation". He expressed his willingness to cooperate with relevant state organs, but threatened an armed insurrection if moves were made to reign in the "Guard".

The paramilitary group was promptly harshly condemned by numerous high-ranking government representatives (including PM Šarec, Interior Minister Györkös Žnidar, former PM Cerar, and president Pahor), political parties, and veterans' and patriotic associations. A sweeping police investigation into the group was already underway by September 4. Šiško responded to the news claiming that he had sources within the police, and that a large part of the police and intelligence services were on his side. He also alleged that the group has been under training for over a year, and was being trained by former ranking military officials. He also claimed that included in the group were veterans who have seen combat "from Afghanistan to Ukraine, and elsewhere".

Some 40 investigators carried out 5 house searches, and arrested Šiško and another person in connection with the affair on September 6. Police found 58 persons participated in the September 1 rally, with no evidence active police or army personnel took part. One of the apprehended suspects said "this government had to be brought down, disabled", and called on rally participants to overthrow some of top ranking government officials. The suspects were facing charges of inciting violent change of the constitutional order, and illicit arms, and drug trafficking (the searches also yielded about a pound of cannabis). The police also stated that participants were misled by the organisers as to the nature of the gathering (which only became clear after the rally commenced), and urged all those who attended to come forward. Šiško and another participant were convicted by a lower court in March 2019, with Šiško sentenced to a 8-month jail sentence.

Some two months after Šiško's conviction and just days prior to the 2019 European Parliament election, Šiško/his party released a campaign video, showing a military fatigues-clad Šiško wielding an AK-style firearm while calling on people to participate in the election (whilst waving the weapon in the air). Šiško also published a satirical video showed an outdoor gathering of several individuals alongside Šiško – all dressed in matching black uniforms and masked with balaclavas – handling various weapons (including multiple apparent firearms (ostensibly replicas), and several cold weapons, including a knife with a serrated back edge, axes, chainsaws, a pickaxe, a hoe, and a scythe) and enacting a mock-arrest of violent immigrants (while their remake of volksmusik tracks with vocals mimicking machine gun-sounds plays in the background (the video also features cut scenes of participants recording the music in a studio)).

Police had on several occasions visited "training sessions" of the Styrian Guard, however, their activities themselves were not found to be punishable under existing laws. In November 2019, police, patrolling the border for migrant crossings, came across a group of 41 apparently armed guardists and seized 7 pieces of suspected firearms. The encounter followed a series of complaints from local residents about the presence of the masked guardists along the border. Responding to the incident, Šiško stated that the guardists train with toy guns so that "when the time comes, we will know how to handle real weapons also". Due to the incidents, the government proposed legal changes in late November that would enable police to more easily curtail the activities of the guardists. The changes would proscribe fines for carrying weapon replicas, or wearing camouflaged clothing or uniforms, so as to imitate police or military personnel, or any behaviour imitating police for the purpose of patrolling the border, or obstructing police border control activities. In December 2019, while patrolling the border, police again encountered 23 guardists and seized two handguns, an expandable baton, an electroshock weapon, and a pair of nunchuks.

In May 2020, a gathering of some 50 uniformed guardists in a privately owned area was visited by a police patrol. The group of guardists, demanding answers, then took to the local police station and interrogated the police commander while livestreaming the encounter on Facebook. In June 2020, guardists harassed a camping grounds owner, accusing him of harbouring migrants and saying that he is being watched.

== Incidents ==
=== Timeline ===
- In 2009, during Pride Parade week, a gay rights activist was physically assaulted in front of a gay bar (Cafe Open) in Ljubljana. 9 perpetrators attacked the activist while he was smoking just outside the bar. The perpetrators were clad in black, concealed their faces with hoods, hats, and masks, and wielded stones, red flares, and hockey sticks, and could be heard shouting "faggots!". The attackers beat up the activist, broke a window of the bar, and threw a flare into the bar before fleeing. Afterwards, three of the nine were apprehended. The attack proved to have been premeditated. The three denied being "far-right sympathisers" (in contrast with some of the other attackers), even though one of them was found to own Nazi literature, and neo-Nazi paraphernalia (a Blood & Honour shirt, and a shirt bearing the likeness of Nazi leader Rudolf Hess). After the three were given a one and a half year prison sentence each, some 100 "schoolmates and friends" of the convicted organised a rally in front of the court, protesting what they viewed as excessive penalties. It was speculated, however, that this March 2010 rally was actually organised by neo-Nazis. In June 2010, Cafe Open and the residence of the judge responsible for the conviction of the trio were defaced with "hateful graffiti". A cobblestone was also thrown through the window of the bar on one occasion. In 2014, the Supreme Court overturned the conviction of the original attackers due to "unjustified storage of trace DNA" evidence that was used to find the three perpetrators. The prosecution refused to further pursue the case.
- In 2009, a group of "blackshirts" threatened the organisers of Tolerance Action in Maribor. A representative of a gay advocacy group present at the event stated that violence was averted only due to the presence of hired guards.
- In early 2010, neo-Nazi violence spread to smaller cities, with incidents in Koper, Slovenj Gradec, and Ilirska Bistrica (where they attacked a local youth centre).
- In April 2010, a group of three neo-Nazis physically attacked students at the Ljubljana Faculty of Arts. The students were presenting a new edition of a student newspaper in which they had often spoken out against Nazism and neo-Nazism, before being attacked as they left the building. Only a year prior, a group of 10–15 self-described "national socialists" entered the faculty and attacked a cameraman who was filming a round-table discussion entitled "Hate speech, neonazism, and neofascism in Slovenia" during an altercation.
- In May 2010, a student demonstration before parliament descended into violence as people in the crowd began throwing cobblestones towards parliament, resulting in the injury of several police officers, damage to the edifice of the parliament building, and the arrests of 30 individuals. Later revelations, based on initial reports of an arrest of at least one B & H member, and subsequent insights from an intelligence agency document, confirmed suspicions that neo-Nazis/"skinheads" were involved in the incident.
- In July 2010, a group of "intolerant skinheads" attacked a group of patrons at a Ljubljana pub. The attackers first began to verbally accost the group which included Cubans and women. An attacker then hit one of the Cubans over the head with a glass bottle, after which the group of assailants began to hurl stones and bottles at the victims. The Cuban nationality of some of the targets likely precipitated the attack.

Violent agitators disrupt the 30 November 2012 Ljubljana anti-government protest (video).

- In November 2011, students of the Faculty of Social Sciences in Ljubljana who were involved in the publishing of a school newspaper received a threat through email, and were warned that "... crossed out swastikas will be strictly punished". The faculty also experienced a disruption of a round table talk about intolerance by a group of neo-Nazis which assailed a speaker, but a prompt police intervention thwarted further escalation. The faculty had previously also been a target of graffiti which depicted swastikas, and pro-Nazi slogans.
- In late 2012, a group of highly organised violent agitators disrupted a peaceful anti-government protest in front of the parliament building in Ljubljana, with at least 10 persons sustaining injuries (including multiple riot police, and a photographer), and 33 individuals arrested as a result of the violence. The violent group consisted of football hooligans, neo-Nazis, and members of extremist far-right groups.
- The former Novo mesto Sokol lodge, which had been restyled into a squat, suffered repeated attacks in late 2015 and early 2016 while serving as a storage area for humanitarian supplies for refugees. In late December 2015, a Molotov cocktail was hurled at the door of the lodge, setting the wooden doors aflame, but causing only minor damage after prompt emergency intervention by firefighters. Eyewitnesses reported that the attack was carried out by two perpetrators, with one sporting a swastika on his sweater. The incendiary attack came a month after the door was defaced by a swastika. The building was targeted a third time in February 2016, with its edifice defaced with a swastika, Celtic crosses, and an inscription reading "traitors". An ominous note threatening to burn down the building was also left by the attackers.
- In June 2016, the Rog factory squat in Ljubljana was attacked by a group of masked assailants. Shortly before midnight, a group of over 30 masked persons, armed with pyrotechnics, stones, and bats, descended upon the building. The attackers pelted the premises with cobblestones and firecrackers, and threatened the occupants of the building with arson. At least 6 individuals were reportedly injured, with one sustaining serious injuries. The perpetrators dispersed and fled after police intervened, although 6 were arrested (aged 17–20). Some 150 occupants were on the premises at the time of the attack. In the months leading up to the attack, Rog factory users were deeply involved in aiding refugees.
- In November 2017, an attack occurred at the premises of the Maribor alternative culture centre Pekarna. During the night, a group of five arrived at the premises, whereupon they called upon an artist who lives on the premises to come outside. After the artist unlocked the door, one of the group lifted his shirt to reveal neo-Nazi tattoos before commencing to physically assault the victim. The victim believes the attack was politically motivated.
- In June 2018, posters bearing Nazi imagery and mottos appeared plastered across Velenje.
- In September 2018, images and videos of a paramilitary-style formation of several dozens masked and uniformed individuals surfaced online. Some participants appeared armed. The group was revealed to have been headed by fringe right-wing politician Andrej Šiško. A sweeping police investigation was promptly launched, revealing many participants were misled as to the nature of the rally, only grasping it once it commenced. Šiško is arrested on multiple charges, including weapons charges, and charges of "inciting violent change of the constitutional order".

=== 2012 Ljubljana protest ===
On November 30, 2012, a group of highly organised violent agitators disrupted a major protest of the 2012-13 Slovenian protests ("Pan-Slovenian uprisings"); a protest in Ljubljana that was taking place in front of the parliament building demanding the resignation of the right-wing government of Janez Janša. Several dozen young men – some wearing face masks – penetrated the mass of protesters in a "paramilitary formation". The group was carrying signs that included a Celtic cross, and could be heard shouting Nazi slogans and seen performing Nazi salutes. The group entered into a confrontation with riot police, pelting them with powerful firecrackers, bottles, cobblestones, Molotov cocktails, and homemade explosive devices. The confrontation resulted in the use of a police helicopter, and a water cannon (the first instance of its deployment in the history of independent Slovenia) as the

Riot police action during the 30 November 2012 Ljubljana protest and subsequent riot (video).

confrontation descended into a riot with police battling smaller groups of riotous hooligans through the streets of Ljubljana. 10-15 riot police sustaining bodily injury (with three sustaining injuries to the head after being hit by cobblestones), and 10 persons were treated at the Ljubljana clinical centre due to injuries sustained during the protests, including three police officers, and a photographer.

The violent group was composed of football hooligans, neo-Nazis, and members of far-right extremist groups (with at least some also being members of Blood & Honour, Headhunters Domžale, and Green Dragons). According to police sources, at least some among the violent agitators were trained, hired, and paid, and police was investigating whether the agitators may have been hired and compensated by political parties. It was later revealed that two members of the Slovene armed forces were also among the arrested.

The incident prompted the establishment of a parliamentary investigative committee to look into the operation of extremist groups in Slovenia and their possible political ties, and adapt laws so as to be better able to address and combat extremism.
