= 2018 Slovenian local elections =

Local elections in Slovenia took place on 18 November 2018. Mayors of all 212 Slovenian municipalities and members of municipal councils were elected. A second round of mayoral elections took place on 2 December 2018.

== Turnout ==
Registered voters: 1,701,275

Time	Votes	%
11:00	259,940	15.28%
16:00	626,855	36.85%
19:00	870,650	51.18%
Final turnout	870.650	51.18%

== Mayoral elections ==
Results of Mayoral elections:

Municipality	Elected Mayor	Suggested by
Urban Municipality of Ljubljana (Capital city)	Zoran Janković	Jože Mermal and a group of voters
Urban Municipality of Celje	Bojan Šrot	List of Mayor of Celje
Urban Municipality of Koper	Aleš Bržan	List of Aleš Bržan
Urban Municipality of Kranj	Matjaž Rakovec	SD
Urban Municipality of Maribor	Saša Arsenovič	SMC
Urban Municipality of Murska Sobota	Aleksander Jevšek	SD
Urban Municipality of Nova Gorica	Klemen Miklavič	Luka Manoljlović and a group of voters
Urban Municipality of Novo Mesto	Gregor Macedoni	Boštjan Grobler and a group of voters
Urban Municipality of Ptuj	Nuška Gajšek	SD
Urban Municipality of Slovenj Gradec	Tilen Kugler	Metka Černjak and a group of voters
Urban Municipality of Velenje	Bojan Kontič	SD
Municipality of Ajdovščina	Tadej Beočanin	SD
Municipality of Apače	Andrej Steyer	SDS
Municipality of Ankaran	Gregor Strmčnik	Darij Dujmovič and a group of voters
Municipality of Beltinci	Marko Virag	Tadej Apatič and a group of voters
Municipality of Benedikt	Milan Repič	SLS
Municipality of Bistrica ob Sotli	Franjo Debelak	Dušan Berkovič and a group of voters
Municipality of Bled	Janez Fajfar	SDS
Municipality of Bloke	Jože Doles	SLS
Municipality of Bohinj	Jože Sodja	Mitja Bajrič and a group of voters
Municipality of Borovnica	Bojan Čebela	Ula Čebela and a group of voters
Municipality of Bovec	Valter Mlekuž	SD
Municipality of Braslovče	Tomaž Žohar	Tomaž Žohar and a group of voters
Municipality of Brda	Franc Mužič	Ernest Žnidarčič
Municipality of Brezovica	Metod Ropret	Aleš Kušar and a group of voters
Municipality of Brežice	Ivan Molan	Dražen Levojević and a group of voters
Municipality of Cankova	Danilo Kacijan	Darko Kerec and a group of voters
Municipality of Cerklje na Gorenjskem	Franc Čebulj	Iztok Čebulj and a group of voters
Municipality of Cerknica	Marko Rupar	SDS
Municipality of Cerkno	Gašper Uršič	Domen Uršič and a group of voters
Municipality of Cerkvenjak	Marjan Žmavc	Damjan Žmavc and a group of voters
Municipality of Cirkulane	Antonija Žumbar	Jelka Pajnkiher and a group of voters
Municipality of Črenšovci	Vera Markoja	Štefan Ftičar and a group of voters
Municipality of Črna na Koroškem	Romana Lesjak	Rajko Lesjak and a group of voters
Municipality of Črnomelj	Andrej Kavšek	Vladimir Radovič and a group of voters
Municipality of Destrnik	Franc Pukšič	Miran Kramberger and a group of voters
Municipality of Divača	Alenka Štrucl Dovgan	Nataša Hreščak and a group of voters
Municipality of Dobje	Franc Leskovšek	SLS
Municipality of Dobrepolje	Igor Ahačevčič	NSi
Municipality of Dobrna	Martin Brecl	SLS
Municipality of Dobrova–Polhov Gradec	Franc Setnikar	Janko Dolinar and a group of voters
Municipality of Dobrovnik	Marjan Kardinar	Marija Kardinar and a group of voters
Municipality of Dol pri Ljubljani	Željko Savič	List of Sotočje
Municipality of Dolenjske Toplice	Franc Vovk	Jernej Ban and a group of voters
Municipality of Domžale	Toni Dragar	List of Toni Dragar
Municipality of Dornava	Janko Merc	Jože Brodnjak and a group of voters
Municipality of Dravograd	Marijana Cigala	Srečko Podojstršek and a group of voters
Municipality of Duplek	Mitja Horvat	Majda Zajc and a group of voters
Municipality of Gorenja Vas–Poljane	Milan Čadež	SDS
Municipality of Gorišnica	Jožef Kokot	SLS
Municipality of Gorje	Peter Torkar	Katjuša Torkar and a group of voters
Municipality of Gornja Radgona	Stanko Rojko	Robert Živkovič and a group of voters
Municipality of Gornji Grad	Anton Špeh	Aljaž Špeh and a group of voters
Municipality of Gornji Petrovci	Franc Šlihthuber	Janez Šlihthuber and a group of voters
Municipality of Grad	Cvetka Ficko	Marjan Ficko and a group of voters
Municipality of Grosuplje	Peter Verlič	SDS
Municipality of Hajdina	Stanislav Glažar	SDS, SD, SLS
Municipality of Hodoš	Ludvik Orban	Rudolf Bunderla Ml.
Municipality of Hoče-Slivnica	Marko Soršak	We know. We can! Marko Soršak.
Municipality of Horjul	Janko Prebil	NSi
Municipality of Hrastnik	Marko Funkl	List of Our Hrastnik
Municipality of Hrpelje-Kozina	Saša Likavec Svetelšek	SD
Municipality of Idrija	Tomaž Vencelj	Jurij Kavčič and a group of voters
Municipality of Ig	Janez Cimperman	SLS
Municipality of Ilirska Bistrica	Emil Rojc	SD
Municipality of Ivančna Gorica	Dušan Strnad	SDS
Municipality of Izola	Danilo Markočič	DeSUS
Municipality of Jesenice	Blaž Račič	Zoran Račič and a group of voters
Municipality of Jezersko	Andrej Karničar	List Jezersko for everybody
Municipality of Juršinci	Alojzij Kaučič	SLS
Municipality of Kamnik	Matej Slapar	NSi
Municipality of Kanal	Tina Gerbec	SD
Municipality of Kidričevo	Anton Leskovar	SDS
Municipality of Kobarid	Marko Matajurc	Maja Manfreda and a group of voters
Municipality of Kobilje	Robert Ščap	SLS
Municipality of Kočevje	Vladimir Prebilič	Lilijana Štefanič and a group of voters
Municipality of Komen	Erik Modec	Valter Makovec and a group of voters
Municipality of Komenda	Stanislav Poglajen	Mirko Pogačar and a group of voters
Municipality of Kostanjevica na Krki	Ladko Petretič	Robert Zagorc and a group of voters
Municipality of Kostel	Ivan Črnkovič	Miran Briški and a group of voters
Municipality of Kozje	Milenca Kranjc	Jožef Kajba and a group of voters
Municipality of Kranjska Gora	Janez Hrovat	Darja Hrovat and a group of voters
Municipality of Križevci	Branko Belec	Franc Sreš and a group of voters
Municipality of Krško	Miran Stanko	SLS
Municipality of Kungota	Tamara Šnofl	Andrej Šnofl and a group of voters
Municipality of Kuzma	Jožef Škalič	Marina Huber and a group of voters
Municipality of Laško	Franc Zdolšek	SLS
Municipality of Lenart	Janez Kramberger	Stanka Ferš and a group of voters
Municipality of Lendava	Janez Magyar	SDS, NSi
Municipality of Litija	Franc Rokavec	SLS
Municipality of Ljubno	Franjo Naraločnik	Greta Naraločnik and a group of voters
Municipality of Ljutomer	Olga Karba	Miran Puconja and a group of voters
Municipality of Log-Dragomer	Miran Stanovnik	Matija Nik in skupina volivcev
Municipality of Logatec	Berto Menard	Damjan Menard and a group of voters
Municipality of Loška Dolina	Janez Komidar	NSi
Municipality of Loški Potok	Ivan Benčina	Janez Debeljak and a group of voters
Municipality of Lovrenc na Pohorju	Marko Rakovnik	Anžej Bečan and a group of voters
Municipality of Luče	Ciril Rosc	Andrej Šiljar and a group of voters
Municipality of Lukovica	Olga Vrankar	Marjan Kveder and a group of voters
Municipality of Majšperk	Darinka Fakin	SLS
Municipality of Makole	Franc Majcen	Petra Novak and a group of voters
Municipality of Markovci	Milan Gabrovec	LDS
Municipality of Medvode	Nejc Smole	Ladislav Vidmar and a group of voters
Municipality of Mengeš	Franc Jerič	Jurij Jerič and a group of voters
Municipality of Metlika	Darko Zevnik	SD
Municipality of Mežica	Dušan Krebel	Roman Abraham and a group of voters
Municipality of Miklavž na Dravskem Polju	Egon Repnik	LM
Municipality of Miren-Kostanjevica	Mauricij Humar	Zorko Budin and a group of voters
Municipality of Mirna	Dušan Skrebiš	Barica Kraljevski
Municipality of Mirna Peč	Andrej Kastelic	Damjan Zupančič and a group of voters
Municipality of Mislinja	Bojan Borovnik	SD
Municipality of Mokronog-Trebelno	Anton Maver	Franc Glušič and a group of voters
Municipality of Moravče	Milan Balažic	Janez Pergar and a group of voters
Municipality of Moravske Toplice	Alojz Glavač	Vlasta Glavač and a group of voters
Municipality of Mozirje	Ivan Suhoveršnik	Jožef Skornšek and a group of voters
Municipality of Muta	Miroslav Vošner	Rudolf Koležnik and a group of voters
Municipality of Naklo	Ivan Meglič	SLS
Municipality of Nazarje	Matej Pečovnik	Nataša Pečovnik Perme and a group of voters
Municipality of Odranci	Ivan Markoja	Greens of Slovenia
Municipality of Oplotnica	Matjaž Orter	Miroslav Vodovnik and a group of voters
Municipality of Ormož	Danijel Vrbnjak	SDS
Municipality of Oplotnica	Alenka Kovač	SMC
Municipality of Pesnica	Gregor Žmak	List 4x4
Municipality of Piran	Đenio Zadković	GZOP
Municipality of Pivka	Robert Smrdelj	SLS
Municipality of Podčetrtek	Peter Misja	Jana Stojnšek and a group of voters
Municipality of Podlehnik	Sebastian Toplak	Janez Koren and a group of voters
Municipality of Podvelka	Anton Kovše	SD
Municipality of Poljčane	Stanislav Kovačič	Marjan Golob and a group of voters
Municipality of Polzela	Jože Kužnik	Dušan Pungartnik and a group of voters
Municipality of Postojna	Igor Marentič	Andrej Berginc and a group of voters
Municipality of Prebold	Vinko Debelak	DeSUS
Municipality of Preddvor	Rok Roblek	Eva Grah Roblek and a group of voters
Municipality of Prevalje	Matija Tasič	Marijana Petrič and a group of voters
Municipality of Puconci	Ludvik Novak	SLS
Municipality of Rače–Fram	Branko Ledinek	SLS
Municipality of Radeče	Tomaž Režun	SD
Municipality of Radenci	Roman Leljak	Maja Rožman and a group of voters
Municipality of Radlje ob Dravi	Alan Bukovnik	SD
Municipality of Radovljica	Ciril Globočnik	Miran Rems and a group of voters
Municipality of Ravne na Koroškem	Tomaž Rožen	Aljaž Verhovnik and a group of citizens
Municipality of Razkrižje	Stanko Ivanušič	Dejan Rob and a group of voters
Municipality of Rečica ob Savinji	Ana Rebernik	Stanislava Prislan and a group of voters
Municipality of Renče–Vogrsko	Tarik Žigon	List for you
Municipality of Ribnica	Samo Pogorelc	Franc Trdan and a group of voters
Municipality of Ribnica na Pohorju	Srečko Geč	SD
Municipality of Rogaška Slatina	Branko Kidrič	SLS
Municipality of Rogašovci	Edvard Mihalič	Alojz Mekič and a group of voters
Municipality of Rogatec	Martin Mikolič	NSi
Municipality of Ruše	Urška Repolusk	Stanislav Krainer and a group of voters
Municipality of Šalovci	Iztok Fartek	Ivanka Balek and a group of voters
Municipality of Selnica ob Dravi	Vlasta Krmelj	SDS
Municipality of Semič	Polona Kambič	SLS
Municipality of Šempeter-Vrtojba	Milan Turk	Pavel Černe and a group of voters
Municipality of Šenčur	Ciril Kozjek	SLS, SDS
Municipality of Šentilj	Štefan Žvab	David Kos and a group of voters
Municipality of Šentjernej	Radko Luzar	Franc Bevc and a group of voters
Municipality of Šentjur	Marko Diaci	Municipality of Šentjur Movement
Municipality of Šentrupert	Andrej Martin Kostelec	SLS
Municipality of Sevnica	Srečko Ocvirk	SLS
Municipality of Sežana	David Škabar	Marjan Masič and a group of voters
Municipality of Škocjan	Jože Kapler	SDS
Municipality of Škofja Loka	Tine Radinja	Miha Ješe and a group of voters
Municipality of Škofljica	Ivan Jordan	Andreja Knez and a group of voters
Municipality of Slovenska Bistrica	Ivan Žagar	SLS, SDS, NSI
Municipality of Slovenske Konjice	Darko Ratajc	SD, SMC, DeSUS
Municipality of Šmarje pri Jelšah	Matija Čakš	Anton Guzej and a group of voters
Municipality of Šmarješke Toplice	Marjan Hribar	Gašper Gregorčič and a group of voters
Municipality of Šmartno ob Paki	Janko Kopušar	Natalija Zabukovnik and a group of voters
Municipality of Šmartno pri Litiji	Rajko Meserko	Darko Vidic and a group of voters
Municipality of Sodražica	Blaž Milavec	SLS
Municipality of Solčava	Katarina Prelesnik	Jasmina Štiftar and a group of voters
Municipality of Šoštanj	Darko Menih	SDS
Municipality of Središče ob Dravi	Jurij Borko	SDS
Municipality of Starše	Bojan Kirbiš	DeSUS, SDS
Municipality of Štore	Miran Jurkošek	Mayors Independent List for Development
Municipality of Straža	Dušan Krštinc	Martin Krštinc and a group of voters of RIOS
Municipality of Sveta Ana	Silvo Slaček	Vinko Ketiš and a group of voters
Municipality of Sveta Trojica v Slovenskih Goricah	David Klobasa	NSi
Municipality of Sveti Andraž v Slovenskih Goricah	Darja Vupler	Independent List Together for the people!
Municipality of Sveti Jurij ob Ščavnici	Anton Slana	Franc Čuš and a group of voters
Municipality of Sveti Jurij v Slovenskih Goricah	Peter Škrlec	SDS
Municipality of Sveti Tomaž	Mirko Cvetko	NSi
Municipality of Tabor	Marko Semprimožnik	SLS
Municipality of Tišina	Franc Horvat	SLS
Municipality of Tolmin	Uroš Brežan	Martina Kenda and a group of voters
Municipality of Trbovlje	Jasna Gabrič	List of Jasna Gabrič for Trbovlje
Municipality of Trebnje	Alojzij Kastelic	Branko Meglič and a group of voters
Municipality of Trnovska Vas	Alojz Benko	SLS
Municipality of Trzin	Peter ložar	Nuša Repše and a group of voters
Municipality of Tržič	Borut Sajovic	Dušan Bodlaj and a group of voters
Municipality of Turnišče	Borut Horvat	SDS
Municipality of Velika Polana	Damijan Jaklin	Alojz Jerebic and a group of voters
Municipality of Velike Lašče	Tadej Malovrh	Tadej Malovrh and a group of voters
Municipality of Veržej	Slavko Petovar	SLS
Municipality of Videm	Branko Marinič	SDS
Municipality of Vipava	Goran Kodelja	Sonja Lukin and a group of voters
Municipality of Vitanje	Slavko vetrih	SLS
Municipality of Vodice	Aco Franc Šuštar	Marjan Podgoršek and a group of voters
Municipality of Vojnik	Branko Petre	SDS, NSi
Municipality of Vransko	Franc Šušnik	SDS
Municipality of Vrhnika	Daniel Cukjati	Daniel Cukjati and a group of voters
Municipality of Vuzenica	Franjo Golob	Danica Golob and a group of voters
Municipality of Zagorje ob Savi	Matjaž Švagan	ZGN
Municipality of Žalec	Janko Kos	SD
Municipality of Zavrč	Slavko pravdič	NSi
Municipality of Železniki	Anton Luznar	SLS
Municipality of Žetale	Anton Butolen	Jože Krivec and a group of voters
Municipality of Žiri	Janez Žakelj	NSi
Municipality of Žirovnica	Leopold Pogačar	Independent list for Žirovnica
Municipality of Zreče	Boris Podvršnik	SDS
Municipality of Žužemberk	Jože Papež	NSi
