= International Day for Mine Awareness and Assistance in Mine Action =

Annual observance on 4 April

- Observed by: globally
- Type: International
- Date: 4 April
- Next time: 4 April 2027
- Frequency: annual

The International Day for Mine Awareness and Assistance in Mine Action is a date designated by the United Nations General Assembly to raise awareness and seek assistance for mine action. It is observed every year on 4 April. This day was designated to advocate for efforts against the dangers of land mines and explosive remnants of war, as well as to promote efforts to clear contaminated areas and assist victims.

== History ==
Mines, explosive remnants of war, and improvised explosive devices (IED) continue to cause death and injury, especially in situations of armed conflict. On average, one person is killed or injured every hour. Many children are among the victims. The United Nations General Assembly proclaimed the International Day for Mine Awareness and Assistance in Mine Action on 8 December 2005. The decision was made to raise public attention towards mine action activities, the threats posed by land mines, and how to work towards their elimination. The day was first observed on 4 April 2006.

The day is significant as it marks the establishment of the UN's accountability framework and the introduction to the UN's Theory of Change in mine action program. The day also aids peacekeepers to carry out patrols, help humanitarians, raise awareness against mines among people living in dangerous atmospheres and educate them how to survive fearlessly and not worry about compromising their lives. The International Day for Mine Awareness and Assistance in Mine Action seeks to achieve a world free of land mines and explosive remnants of war. This is to help individuals and communities to survive in a safe environment where the victim's needs are taken care of.

== Events and activities ==
Various events and activities are organized to mark this day. In 2024, the United Nations Mine Action Service (UNMAS) opened a multi-media exhibition themed "Witnessing a Way Forward: Protecting Lives. Building Peace". The exhibition highlighted the need for the full implementation of Security Council resolution 2475 (2019), which calls on all Member States and Council members to take into account the needs of persons with disabilities in conflict situations.

The 2024 commemoration of the International Day for Mine Awareness and Assistance in Mine Action focused on disabled survivors of explosive hazards, and all people with disabilities living through conflicts. The United Nations called for a greater responsiveness to the needs and rights of all people with disabilities in conflict and peacebuilding settings.
