= Slovenian Democratic Party =

Political party in Slovenia

Slovenian Democratic Party Slovenska demokratska stranka
- Abbreviation: SDS
- President: Janez Janša
- Deputy presidents: Zvone Černač; Aleš Hojs; Romana Tomc
- Founder: Jože Pučnik
- Founded: 16 February 1989
- Headquarters: Trstenjakova ulica 8, Ljubljana
- Youth wing: Slovenian Democratic Youth
- Membership (2026): 36,000
- Ideology: National conservatism; Slovene nationalism; Right-wing populism
- Political position: Right-wing
- European affiliation: European People's Party
- European Parliament group: European People's Party Group (3 MEPs); Patriots for Europe (1 MEP, since 2026)
- International affiliation: Centrist Democrat International; International Democracy Union
- National Assembly: 28 / 90
- European Parliament: 4 / 9
- Mayors: 10 / 212
- Municipal council: 666 / 2,750

Party flag

Website
- sds.si

The Slovenian Democratic Party (Slovene: Slovenska demokratska stranka, SDS), formerly the Social Democratic Party of Slovenia (Slovene: Socialdemokratska stranka Slovenije, SDSS), is a right-wing parliamentary party; it is also one of the largest parties in Slovenia, with approximately 30,000 reported members in 2013.

It has been described as nationalist and right-wing, encompassing both national and social conservatism. Led by Prime Minister of Slovenia Janez Janša, the SDS is a member of the European People's Party, Centrist Democrat International and International Democracy Union.

The SDS evolved from what was originally a social-democratic force into a national-conservative and staunchly right-wing populist party. It pursues a hardline anti-migration agenda, advocates for tax cuts, and levels sharp criticism at traditional media outlets and liberal elites. On the international stage, Janša had maintained close alliances with the then Hungarian Prime Minister Viktor Orbán.

After the 2026 Slovenian parliamentary election, the party formed the governing coalition with New Slovenia and the Democrats.

== History ==
=== Origins ===
SDS has its origins in the Slovenian anti-Communist pro-democracy dissident labour union movement of the late 1980s. The Social Democratic Union of Slovenia (later renamed Social Democratic Party and, in 2003, Slovenian Democratic Party) was first headed by trade unionist France Tomšič, then by the prominent Slovenian pro-independence and pro-democracy dissident Jože Pučnik, who resigned in 1993. The party was part of the Democratic Opposition of Slovenia (DEMOS) coalition.

The Slovenian Democratic Party developed from the merger of two distinct political parties, being the legal successor of both of the Social Democratic Union of Slovenia and the Slovenian Democratic Union, member parties of the Democratic Opposition of Slovenia (DEMOS) which defeated the Communist Party of Slovenia-derived parties in the first democratic Slovenian election in 1990.

The Social Democratic Union of Slovenia had emerged from an independent, anti-Communist trade union movement in the late 1980s. Its first president was the trade union leader France Tomšič, who in December 1987 organized a milestone workers' strike which lead to the establishment of an independent trade union, Neodvisnost, thus following the example of the Solidarity movement in Poland, and, in 1989, the party (which was the first opposition party in the former communist world). Tomšič was replaced as leader by Jože Pučnik later that year while the SDU was renamed as Social Democratic Party of Slovenia (SDS). Pučnik was a former dissident who had been forced to emigrate to Germany as a political exile in the 1960s.

The Slovenian Democratic Union was founded in January 1989 as opposition to the Communist Party of Slovenia, emphasizing establishment of the rule of law and respect for human rights and fundamental political freedoms, respect for minority rights, and Euro-Atlantic integration (the European Union and NATO).

In 1991, after a conflict between the leadership and membership of SDU, the Slovenian Democratic Union split into two parties – the social-liberal wing established the Democratic Party (DSS), while the conservative faction founded the National Democratic Party (NDS). Although the Social Democratic Party suffered a clear defeat in the 1992 election, barely entering Parliament, it formed a coalition with the winning Liberal Democracy of Slovenia (LDS) and entered the cabinet of Janez Drnovšek.

Janša became party leader in 1993 after Jože Pučnik resigned due to health issues (Pučnik later became the honorary president of the party, a function he held until his death in January 2003). In 1995, the National Democratic Party joined SDS, which thus became one of the legal successors of the Slovenian Democratic Union.

Janša served as Minister of Defense from 1990 to 1994. Janša has been accused of having abused his position to consolidate political power, engaging in arms trafficking to arm combatants in the Yugoslav Wars in violation of a United Nations arms embargo, and blackmailing prominent individuals, including politicians, businesspeople, journalists, and cultural and literary figures, by threatening to make public information (to which he was privy to in his ministerial role) regarding their previously undisclosed involvement with the former communist secret police.

In 1994, Janez Janša was dismissed by Prime Minister Janez Drnovšek from his role as Defence Minister because of his involvement in the Depala Vas affair (which centered around an incident in which military personnel arrested and mistreated a civilian off-duty undercover police associate that was attempting to obtain classified documents about the Ministry of Defence). SDS subsequently left the Drnovšek government as a result. The dismissal prompted protests by Janša's supporters and there were founded fears inside the government that Janša, backed by the nascent military, may refuse to relinquish power. A 2003 Mladina article alleged that Slovenia's military's special unit (MORiS) was in 1994 performing military exercises intended to prepare the force to carry out a military coup d'état. The police force was at the same time covertly preparing to secure the state and prevent a military takeover. In a press conference shortly prior to the article's publication, Janša pointed to documents detailing these police plans to secure state institutions to argue that a coup was in fact afoot against his Ministry. In a 1999 interview with Delo, Janša commented on the events of 1994, saying: "I held immense power in my hands. [...] And in 1994, when they were deposing me, there was a lot of suggestions that we not accept this removal. I could have done that. But I didn't." In 1995, Janša was charged for alleged illegal arms trafficking, but the case was never brought to trial.

SDS remained in opposition for the next 10 years, except for a brief period in 2000, when it entered a short-lived centre-right government led by Andrej Bajuk, while gaining popularity among – as described by one of its former supporters, Peter Jambrek – "lower, frustrated social strata".

=== A populist turn ===
After the year 2000, the party applied for membership in the European People's Party (EPP). The rightward shift culminated in the 2003 name change from Social Democratic Party to Slovenian Democratic party. The party was described as liberal-conservative or conservative-liberal in ideological orientation.

The party's radical populism, nationalistic, and xenophobic attacks was also observed by political analysts. Moreover, the local Slovenian Catholic Church supported it more than any other Slovenian political party. Even though not a nominally Christian party, the local church has stood fully and unconditionally behind it.

=== 2004–2008: in power (first Janša Cabinet) ===
On 3 October 2004, SDS won the 2004 parliamentary election with 29.1% of the popular vote and 29 out of 88 seats. SDS then formed a coalition with New Slovenia (NSi), the Slovenian People's Party (SLS), and Democratic Party of Pensioners of Slovenia (DeSUS), holding a total of 49 parliamentary seats (out of 90). SDS has been accused of catering to the interests of the Slovenian Roman Catholic Church in exchange for political support.

==== Internal affairs ====
The government introduced measures to supervise, and to curtail the powers of the Slovenian Intelligence and Security Agency. The measures were strongly rebuked by the opposition and segments of the press as an attempt to discredit the secret intelligence service and cast a negative shadow on the policies of previous governments.

==== Freedom of the press ====
The first SDS government was the target of widespread criticism due to allegations of meddling in the independence of the press. The first SDS government has been accused of politicising the independent press by appointing political allies to leadership and journalist positioned in the state Slovenian Press Agency, daily newspaper Delo, regional newspaper Primorske novice, and public media and broadcasting organisation, RTV Slovenia. The government was accused of using state-owned funds and companies with controlling stakes in newspaper companies to purge critical editors and journalists.

State-owned companies also ceased purchasing adverts in the daily newspaper Dnevnik and weekly political magazine Mladina, two publications critical of the administration.

By changing the laws governing the administration of the public broadcaster RTV Slovenia, the government enabled increased political control of the state media organisation's editorial board and its board of directors by increasing the number of board members appointed by the government. The law faced a referendum challenge, but was approved by a tight margin as it also promised to lower compulsory contributions for the broadcaster's funding.

In a secret 2007 deal with the head of the Laško Brewery that owned the flagship national newspaper Delo as subsidiary, PM Janša secured editorial influence over the newspaper while Laško would be allowed to acquire a stake in a state-owned grocery store corporation. A new, government-friendly editor-in-chief was installed despite overwhelming opposition from the newspaper's staff, and nearly a dozen of the newspaper's journalists resigned in protest. The remaining journalists found reporting critically on the government increasingly difficult due to pressure from the new leadership. In 2008, after a souring of relations, the head of Laško accused Janša of threatening him with arrest if he refused to sell the Delo newspaper company.

In 2007, over five hundred journalists launched a petition against political pressures on the media. The petition accused premier Janša of limiting press freedom in particular, but was also more broadly aimed against all infringements of press freedom by either government, political actors in general, or media company owners. The International Press Institute voiced support for the petition and called on the government to create an independent body to investigate the claims of media influence. The Association of European Journalists warned in 2007 of Slovene media companies' boards interfering in journalistic autonomy, reprimanding journalists and fostering other conditions that prevent critical reporting about the government and lead to self-censorship while journalists are also being prevented from covering issues that may go against the interests of the owners. SDS foreign minister Dimitrij Rupel had previously advised media owners to consider thoroughly whether a battle with the government is in their interest.

SDS rejected accusations of impropriety, claiming the media was in fact controlled by leftist opposition groups.

==== Economy and finance ====
The first Cabinet of Janez Janša oversaw a period of rapid economic growth. GDP grew by nearly 5% between 2004 and 2006, reaching nearly 7% growth in 2007, making Slovenia the fastest-growing eurozone member for that year. The economic boom, however, was highly dependent on private debt, particularly corporate debt. Additionally, the Janša government failed to implement meaningful structural reforms or accumulate budget surpluses during the period of sustained growth, instead opting for pork barrel politics, reducing tax burdens while engaging in economic populist overspending, making the country particularly susceptible to the 2008 financial crisis.

Andrej Bajuk, Minister of Finance in Janša's first cabinet, listed the passage of comprehensive tax reform (which included the lowering of corporate taxes and taxes on juridical persons, a reduction of the tax burden on individual incomes, the flattening of income tax margin progression, an increase in tax deductions, and a simplification of the tax code), overseeing the implementation of the Euro and the privatisation of state-owned NKBM bank, and reducing public expenditure as the greatest accomplishments of the ministry during his term (2004–2008).

According to Janša, the most prominent economic challenge confronted by his government was a bout of inflation (which occurred during the 2007-08 period and was steepest for foodstuff prices). At the close of 2007, the inflation rate in Slovenia was the highest of any Eurozone member. Janša, Finance Minister Bajuk and other government officials pointed to high oil prices and a non-competitive internal food market as the main underlying causes for the inflation. Janša faced criticism for his statement regarding the issue made during a gathering of regional politicians and businessmen; Janša dismissed concerns regarding rising food prices, saying that "as long as there are loaves of bread in every city dumpster the situation isn't alarming". Economic Development Minister Andrej Vizjak similarly addressed cost of living concerns by saying that citizens "should not be loath to occasionally eat yesterday's bread", going on to say that the food price increases are an opportunity to address the overindulgence of Slovenian consumers.

==== Foreign policy ====
The government oversaw the country's entry into the European Union and NATO.

=== 2008–2011: in opposition ===
In the 2008 parliamentary election (held on 21 September 2008) narrowly lost against the Social Democrats, until then the main opposition party. It also lost one seat in Slovenian Parliament, falling to 28.

With the election of the Social Democrat leader Borut Pahor as Prime Minister of Slovenia, the Slovenian Democratic Party officially declared it would stay in opposition and form a shadow cabinet. The shadow government was formed in late December 2008, and it includes several independent members as well as members from other conservative parties.

In the 2009 European election, the SDS was the most popular party in Slovenia with 26.9% of votes, more than eight points ahead of the second-most popular party, the ruling Social Democrats.

In 2009, the MP Franc Pukšič left the Slovenian Democratic Party and joined the Slovenian People's Party; the SDS parliamentary group was thus reduced from 28 to 27 MPs.

=== 2012–2013: a year in power (second Janša Cabinet) ===
In the 2011 snap parliamentary election (held on 4 December after the centre-left governing coalition collapsed due to internal conflict and inefficacy in passing meaningful economic reforms), SDS won 26.19% of the vote, gaining 26 seats in the National Assembly, thus making SDS the second-largest parliamentary party after the newly formed centre-left party, Positive Slovenia (PS) (headed by Ljubljana mayor Zoran Janković), which won 28 MPs (28.5% of the total). However, SDS succeeded in forming a ruling four-party coalition government (which included the Civic List, New Slovenia, Slovenian People's Party, and Democratic Party of Pensioners of Slovenia) (holding a combined total of 50 out of 90 parliamentary seats) some two months after the election after PS failed to form a coalition with a parliamentary majority. The coalition took power amid an alarming economic downturn (European debt crisis). The country's economic woes were further exacerbated by credit agencies' lowering of Slovenia's credit rating amid the political tumult.

The coalition, headed by SDS, undertook drastic economic and financial reforms in an attempt to halt the economic downturn. Finance Minister Janez Šuštaršič pledged to speed up privatisation of state enterprises, cut public spending, and reduce budget shortfalls. Janša additionally pledged to cut taxes, remove regulations, lower the deficit, and raise the retirement age. The coalition passed laws transferring all state-owned enterprises into a single state holding company to accelerate privatisation efforts, and created a bad bank that would take on non-performing loans from the bad debt-ridden state-owned banks. It intended to cut profit and income taxes to boost the economy, and enact constitutional changes demanding balance budgets. It also passed sweeping and highly contentious austerity measures (the Law of Public Finance Balance (Slovene: Zakon o uravnovešenju javnih financ (ZUJF))), and reportedly planned further cuts to state spending. The ZUJF fiscal consolidation law included provisions lowering pensions (widely opposed by the public), cutting wages for public sector employees, reducing education funding, social transfers and benefits. The draft of the law sparked a public sector general strike, and the law faced the possibility of a referendum.

The SDS-led government proved impotent in stemming the economic troubles facing the nation. Despite the momentous reforms efforts, the economic troubles intensified, resulting in increasing levels of unemployment, plunging living standards, a fall in domestic spending, and large budget deficits. The fall in domestic demand, coupled with falling exports, resulted in a double dip recession. A 2016 article alleges that the sharp downturn in Slovenian economic outlook was a result of Janša's overdramatic public statements regarding the economic fitness of the nation. Janša reportedly made such ominous claims for political purposes as means of solidifying political power and as a negotiating strategy to strengthen his hand during negotiations with public sector unions. The PM's eerie pronouncements were taken at face value by foreign observers, however, creating a self-fulfilling feedback loop where gloomy statements made by top Slovene officials created more panic and dismay in the foreign press and various organisations, and vice versa, resulting in falling credit ratings and asset prices, and excessive capital injections/bailouts with funds borrowed at excessively high interest rates.

In late 2012, protests began to take place in Slovenia's second largest city, Maribor, against its mayor and SDS ally, Franc Kangler, who was being investigated due to allegations of corruption. The protests soon picked up momentum and spread across the country, becoming the largest in the independent republic's history. Protestors' main grievances were the harsh austerity measures imposed by the ruling government, looming sale-offs of state enterprises, and allegations of widespread corruption among the ruling elite. The protests also saw the worst violence in the nation's history as an independent state, with small groups of young, violent extremists - likely members of far-right and hooligan groups - clashing with police. In early 2013, the instability and public resentment was compounded after the Commission for the Prevention of Corruption revealed both PM Janez Janša and the leader of the largest opposition party (PS), Zoran Janković, violated anti-corruption laws by failing to report or account for assets in their possession and received income/payments. Janša also faced graft charges even before ascending to the premiership in 2012. He was one of the defendants being tried for corruption as result of a 2006 bribery scandal involving charges of accepting kickbacks to fund his party's electoral campaign. Media reports alleging Slovenian Intelligence and Security Agency was "infiltrated" by members of SDS also surfaced. Amid mounting pressure from continuing anti-government protests, a strike of public sector workers, and the lowest public opinion ratings of any government in the nation's history, coalition partners began to depart from the coalition. The government finally collapsed after a vote of no confidence, and a PS consensus candidate, Alenka Bratušek, was appointed as PM (despite some protests that continued to demand a snap election).

=== 2013–2020: return to opposition ===
On 20 March 2013, the second Janša cabinet was replaced by the cabinet of Alenka Bratušek, a four-party centre-left coalition led by the new leader of Positive Slovenia, Alenka Bratušek.

In June 2013, Janša was convicted in the Patria case, but appealed the verdict. In April 2014, the Higher Court upheld the two-year jail sentence passed on Janez Janša as result of the bribery conviction. In June of that year, Janša began serving out his sentence, 26 years after his imprisonment for leaking military secrets as a whistle-blower (his imprisonment, trial, and public reaction were a milestone in the Slovenian path to independence). Despite his imprisonment, Janša stood as candidate for MP.

In the May 2014 European Parliament election, SDS came in first place nationally, garnering 24.78% of the vote, and winning three MEP seats (out of eight allocated for Slovenia).

The party received 20.69% of the vote in the snap Slovenian parliamentary election held on 13 July 2014, and won 21 seats in parliament. The party remained in opposition, this time to the cabinet of Miro Cerar. Janez Janša was reelected as MP despite being imprisoned. The Constitutional Court decided not to deprive Janša of his MP mandate, and Janša was allowed leave while carrying out his political functions. The Constitutional Court suspended Janša's jail sentence in December, pending the ruling regarding his appeal of the Patria verdict. The Constitutional Court decided to annul the Higher Court's decision in April 2015, returning it to the lower courts for retrial. In September of the same year, the statute of limitations of the Patria case expired.

SDS representatives expressed the belief that the trial was politically motivated and that the imprisonment of the party frontman unfairly hindered their election efforts, declaring the elections illegitimate and "stolen", and demanded fresh elections. In 2018, SDS sued the state for alleged financial damages the party incurred due to the alleged election "theft", and lost the case.

With a campaign largely based on anti-immigration populist rhetoric, SDS topped public opinion polls heading into the 2018 parliamentary election. The incendiary electoral campaign sparked a rally under the title "Without Fear — Against the Politics of Hatred", with some 2,000-3,000 heart-shaped balloon-carrying marchers in attendance.

During the 2018 electoral campaign, SDS also begun to send postable questionnaires ("voter consults") to Slovene households. The questionnaires contained loaded questions and proposals (e.g. "... Do you support SDS's proposal that the healthcare system be set in order?"). The effort was apparently part of the party's electoral campaign, and likely fashioned on Hungarian "national consultations", which the country's ruling party has practiced for years.

SDS once again emerged as winner in the 3 June 2018 parliamentary election, garnering 24.92% of the vote and winning 25 MP seats. However, the party was unlikely to be able to shore up needed support for a governing coalition, as most parliamentary parties (List of Marjan Šarec, Social Democrats, Modern Centre Party, The Left, Party of Alenka Bratušek, and Democratic Party of Pensioners of Slovenia) had declared that they would not participate in a coalition with SDS. Some two weeks after the 2018 election, Janša again met with Hungarian PM Orbán during a private visit in Budapest. Janša and Orbán also held a conference call with US president Donald Trump during the meeting. Janša stated he would be willing to relinquish his post as PM designate to some other SDS MP such a move would ease tensions and enable SDS to form a coalition government. Despite the concession, the PM post was eventually occupied by the leader of the second largest parliamentary party, Marjan Šarec, who succeeded in forming a centre-left minority government (without the participation of SDS).

After the 2018 parliamentary election, SDS failed to regain its traditionally strong showing of support in opinion polls which had been typical for the party while in opposition. Speaking to the media regarding the faltering performance, SDS officials blamed the government's alleged populist economic policies and a disproportionately hostile news media, while independent political analysts pointed to the big tent populist appeal of the ruling LMŠ party and its leader that attracted some traditionally conservative voters, and the momentous changes in the political environment and nature of SDS since 2011-2012.

=== 2020–2022: third Janša Cabinet ===
In early 2020, the resignation of the finance minister due to intra-government disagreements regarding the crafting of a health insurance reform bill precipitated the resignation of PM Šarec, who called for an early election. SDS was however able to secure support for the formation of a new SDS-led government by forming a coalition with New Slovenia, Democratic Party of Pensioners of Slovenia (DeSUS), and Modern Centre Party (SMC). While all three parties had expressed clear opposition to a formation of a Janša-led government in the past, all had since experienced changes of leadership that was more amenable to such an arrangement. The news that SMC would be entering into a coalition with Janša resulted in the departure of the party's founder and first head, Miro Cerar, after whom the party was initially named ("Miro Cerar Party").

Janša was confirmed as PM on 13 March 2020. The coalition agreement signed between the 4 parties stipulated, among other things: the re-introduction of the draft and 6 months of mandatory military service, utilisation of private healthcare providers to reduce waiting times, an increase in public and private healthcare funds, promote apprenticeships in vocational school, a commitment to carbon neutrality by 2050, decentralisation, decreasing public spending, an increase in funds for municipalities, tax reductions for performance pay, an increase in pensions, and an introduction of a universal child benefit instead of an income-based one.

=== 2022–2026: Second opposition term ===
In April 2022, liberal opposition, The Freedom Movement, won the parliamentary election. The Freedom Movement won 34.5% of the vote, compared with 23.6% for Slovenian Democratic Party. On 25 May 2022, Slovenia's parliament voted to appoint the leader of Freedom Movement, Robert Golob, as the new Prime Minister of Slovenia to succeed Janez Janša.

Following the 2024 European Parliament elections, Janša opposed the European People's Party maintaining its coalition with left-leaning parliamentary groups, and expressed openness to leaving the EPP. There was speculation that the SDS would join the right-wing Patriots for Europe group, though this ultimately did not happen.

=== 2026–present: fourth Janša Cabinet ===
On 22 May 2026, Janša was elected as Prime Minister and took office the same day, replacing Robert Golob as Prime Minister, returning the SDS to power but in a minority coalition government with other right wing political parties in Slovenia.

== Ideology and policies ==
Originally a centre-left to centre-right political party, SDS gradually drifted rightward, and eventually came to be described as a centre-right to right-wing party.

Janša has been described as an illiberal leader. Commenting on the question of illiberal democracies like those in Hungary and Poland, Janša stated: "For me, all of these mainstream political orientations are equal, and equally legitimate. [...] I cannot agree to the division between liberal and illiberal democracy. Democracy is democracy [...] If I fight for the affection of my voters, in a free world, everyone is equal."

Deutsche Welle has described supporters of the party as "disagree[ing] with the majority of the population on more or less everything, starting with the history of World War II, where they cherish the memory of the German-allied wartime military guard."

=== Populism ===
During the European migrant crisis, SDS sharply intensified its nationalist populist rhetoric. The party came out in opposition of migrant quotas and advocated diverting financial resources from non-governmental organisations to security spending. Janša also lambasted the "degenerate left". The party's heated rhetoric and allegations of corrupt practices have led "to concerns among international observers about the direction of Slovenia, which is generally regarded as a regional success story" as SDS topped opinion polls heading into the 2018 parliamentary election.

The party has co-opted US president Donald Trump's populist rhetoric, with Janša and the party echoing Trump's catchphrases "drain the swamp", "deep state", and "fake news". The party has also proposed requiring that for each new regulation, two existing regulations must be repealed, a proposal notably advocated for and enacted by Trump. Janša has also used the phrase "Slovenia first" on multiple occasions. Janša's rhetoric has been described as "Trumpian".

The party periodically sends questionnaire mailers to Slovene households. The so-called Consultations with Voters ask recipients to fill out answers to highly suggestive questions and enter their personal information to be eligible to receive various prizes.

=== Domestic policy ===
==== Economic policy ====
SDS has been described as broadly pro-market, and its economic policies have been characterised as neoliberal. SDS advocates for lower taxes and speeding up privatisation efforts.

==== Social policy ====
SDS introduced legislation allowing for same-sex civil unions while in government, but has opposed recognition of same-sex marriages. PM Janša was one of the few EU leaders to explicitly back the Hungarian government's right to prohibit the portrayal of LGBT persons and topics in mass media which could be seen by children.

==== Education policy ====
SDS advocates the introduction of educational programs that would introduce "patriotic education from kindergarten through high school". The party holds that all expenses of compulsory curricular programs in private schools should be borne by the state.

==== National security ====
Janša has expressed strong support for the re-instatement of mandatory military service for males with service lasting at least 6 months (with an option of 12 months of civil service for conscientious objectors).

In early 2016, SDS proposed the establishment of a national guard composed of some 25,000 "patriotic" volunteers. The guard would replace all current reserve formations of the Slovene armed forces, would be under direct command of the general staff, and would be mobilised during natural disasters or during "altered national security states" (like the European refugee crisis, which was ongoing at the time). Both sexes could enlist. MP Žan Mahnič stated the establishment of the formation was a priority of the party's electoral platform. The proposal was prompted by worsening global national security prospects, in part due to the "migrant crisis", an SDS representative claimed. Government representatives argued that such a formation is unnecessary as the current reserve formations are sufficient.

==== Judiciary and law enforcement ====
SDS advocates for trials to be open to the public (except in special circumstances).

==== Environment and climate change ====
During the first SDS government, PM Janša presented climate change as the major political and societal challenge of the era. In 2007, Janša stated that "climate change is not only a problem for the government and economy; it is a challenge for the wider society and every individual" during an international conference on the matter, stressing the dangers and opportunities associated with the issue. He called on the EU to lead the efforts to combat climate change. In 2008, Janša described an EU legislative package on energy and climate change as "one of the most important ... of the beginning of the 21st century", and as one of the priorities of Slovenia during its EU Council Presidency. In 2008, SDS MEP Romana Jordan Cizelj stated that "counteracting climate change is not an individual choice, but a global challenge requiring the effort of the society as a whole. [...] The data reveal changes in ecosystems due to antropogenic emissions and possible trends in the future. [...] It is still possible to act. But we must act decisively, swiftly, and in unison. First in coordination within the EU, and then in the global sense."

By 2018, the party seemed to have reversed its position on the issue, with MP Branko Grims prominently making multiple public statements, including in media statements and parliamentary discussions, that outright denied the existence of anthropogenic climate change. Grims has said that "the talk about the warming of the Earth is a big lie", that the Earth is in fact cooling, that climate change is being used as an excuse for allowing mass migrations and the expropriation of taxpayer funds (that are then embezzled by academics, the "eco-industry" and leftist lobbies), and that the political left is using the issue to exploit the youth. Grims has appealed to his background as a geologist to present himself as authoritative on the issue. Grims also controversially claimed that the black panther, which is ostensibly represented in the Carantanian panther sigil that has been adopted as the alternate Slovenian national symbol by some modern-era conservative political groups, was native to the Slovene region but became extinct due to global cooling during the Carantanian era (the claim was dismissed by experts who said the black panther had not been endemic to the region since at least the last ice age). In November 2019, Janša, discussing climate change, stated: "Times are different now, generations are growing up with an awareness that the environment is a value. Of course, some on the left scene, pervaded by cultural Marxism, have swiftly added catastrophic proclamations which are supposed to be caused by climate change. It is being preached how climate change is exclusively man-made, which is entirely unproven. Climate change has been occurring throughout the history of this planet and will continue to. To what extent we are influencing this is a big question. It is a fact that we are. It is a fact that environmental pollution of course in part affects the climate. But I think that it affects it much less than changes on the Sun, or, that is, things which humans cannot influence. This must be understood and it should not be made into ideology and the fame of new Molochs such as Greta."

==== Other policies ====
SDS has long advocated for a change in the Slovene parliamentary electoral system, namely a shift from the current proportional electoral system to two-round plurality voting. SDS argues this would ensure more stable and effective governments.

SDS supports citizens' "legal right to bear arms", and has come out in opposition to further restrictions. It strongly opposed new EU regulation of firearms which the European Commission moved to pass after the 2015 Paris terrorist attacks. SDS has backed legislation to loosen controls on civilian possession of firearms, firearm accessories, and other weapons. In 2023, Janša called on citizens to legally arm themselves in order to "protect their family and their country" from immigrants, saying that the current government was incapable of protecting the country and its citizens.

SDS supports legalising the medicinal use of cannabis, but opposes legalisation of its recreational use.

SDS opposes the legalisation of assisted dying.

SDS argues the current text to the Slovene national anthem—the 7th stanza of France Prešeren's A Toast ("Blessed be all nations/Which yearn to see the light of day/When where'er the Sun doth wander/The lands' strife shall be cast away/And when free every kinsman will be/Not fiends, only neighbours in foreigners we'll see!")—is "too internationalistic, and insufficiently patriotic", and advocates other stanzas from Prešeren's poem be added as text to the official anthem.

The party advocates a ban on "all public expression of ideas through the use of totalitarian symbols" and "all public displays of affection for totalitarian regimes". The party has denied accusations that it is merely attempting to outlaw the red star, which was the symbol of the Slovene Partisans during WWII, and is still often used in the Slovenian public sphere, including as a symbol/logo of a parliamentary political party. The proposed law would not, on the other hand, ban wearing Nazi uniforms in public or displaying symbols associated with the Nazi-aligned anti-Partisan Slovene Home Guard.

=== Foreign policy ===
The party is pro-European, but staunchly anti-immigration and strongly opposed to EU asylum quotas. The party is committed to Slovenia's continuing membership in NATO.

Following the US targeted killing of Iranian gen. Qasem Soleimani, the party released a statement declaring that "SDS supports the strong US response to the provocations of the Ayatollah extremist regime ... ."

Janša has expressed steadfast support for Israel and former Israeli prime minister Benjamin Netanyahu and his government. During the 2021 Israel–Palestine crisis, the SDS-led Slovenian government flew an Israeli flag on the ediface of the building housing the Slovene government as a show of support and solidarity with Israel. Janša has described criticism of Israel's policies towards Palestinians as tantamount to antisemitism.

After taking over the European Council presidency in 2021, the third Janša government chose confronting violent left-wing extremism and anarchism at the EU level as one of its proposed policy priorities.

Janša and SDS support Ukraine in the context of the Russo-Ukrainian War and advocate a hardline stance against Russia. In 2014, the party put out a statement endorsing the Euromaidan protests and the efforts of fellow EPP affiliates therein, condemning human rights abuses by the then-incumbent Ukrainian government of Viktor Yanukovych. In 2015, SDS accused Miro Cerar's then-incumbent government of Russophilia and drifting away from Europe, citing a visit to Slovenia by then-Russian prime minister Dmitry Medvedev. Following the full-scale 2022 Russian invasion of Ukraine, Janša was among the first foreign leaders to visit Ukraine on 15 March 2022 alongside the Polish and Czech prime ministers at the time, respectively Mateusz Morawiecki and Petr Fiala. The visit was aimed at supporting Ukraine's independence.

=== Post-communist cabal conspiracy ===
The central tenet of the party's view regarding the country's political situation is that a clique composed mostly of former Communist Party officials and associates has retained significant control over the economic, financial, political, social, judicial, and journalistic aspects of Slovenian public life. SDS has accused the post-communist underground of undermining SDS-led governments and lamented that "Slovenia is the only former communist country that has not implemented the lustration." In 2021, PM Janša addressed an official missive to the European Commission, calling on the European Union to launch an official inquiry into the "problem ... [of] Slovenia's communist legacy" that is ostensibly endangering "the state of democracy in Slovenia", and to aid the Slovenian government in remedying the situation. SDS's emphasis on the role of former Yugoslav communist party affiliates in Slovene political and public life has been criticised as hypocritical since many SDS politicians were also active within the former Yugoslav communist regime.

In a 2021 draft party resolution, SDS warned that the country's democratic order is under threat from leftist extremist forces at home and abroad, claiming that the country may be on the verge of a coup, civil war, and an establishment of a totalitarian government. The document claims that the goal of the entrenched elites has progressed beyond attempting to eliminate Janša and SDS, to attempting to institute a new communist order in the country. The document also calls for the banning of the allegedly unconstitutional party The Left (citing a fake "secret manifesto" of the party), and concludes by affirming the party's commitment to prevent, by any means necessary, "the establishment of an eco-socialist system ... totalitarian system". Shortly after releasing the party document, SDS requested a parliamentary session to be held to discuss the ostensible unconstitutional conduct of The Left party and pass a resolution calling on "all state organs to intensify their monitoring, investigations, and prevention of attempts to overthrow parliamentary democracy and other constitutional foundations" due to The Left party's policies, and inviting the ministers of interior and defense as well as the chief of national intelligence to participate in the session. The speaker of parliament refused to hold the session after ascertaining that the issue was under the purview of the judicial branch. After the 3rd Janša government was defeated in the 2022 Slovenian parliamentary elections, Janša repeatedly accused the succeeding Golob government of leading the country into civil war. In a lengthy 2023 essay, Janša warned of impending deadly violence from leftist government supporters and warned that his side will respond to any killing of one of theirs with retaliatory mass killings: "[they are] once again reviving the ominous spirit of CIVIL WAR [...] Those who threaten DEATH today, who applaud such threats or encourage them by implementing the government measures listed above, are mostly publicly known. The digital world holds all these records. So, beware. [...] A revolt will break out, and there is no tax haven that is far away enough where those responsible can hide from the hand of justice. [...] realise that the lady with the scythe is swinging from both sides. [...] people of a particular calibre only understood this language. So, we have used it, and we believe that they have understood it. But we no longer believe that they will listen to what we have to say. They have taken things too far."

SDS members and affiliates frequently employ particular phrases and concepts to represent their world-view, most notably:

- "Udbomafia" (from UDBA, the Yugoslav secret police service) – a portmanteau neologism coined in the early 1990s to refer to an alleged cabal of former Slovenian Communist Party members and officials, and UDBA informants and collaborators that supposedly still hold the reins of economic and political power. The phrase is often used by SDS and affiliated publications.
- "Uncles from behind the scenes" (or "godfathers in the background," an idiom for éminence grise) – alleged sponsors and influencers of prominent Slovene politicians who are said to merely act as fronts for the vested political and economic interests of the "uncles". Former PMs Miro Cerar, and Alenka Bratušek, PS head Zoran Janković, and anti-establishment newcomer Marjan Šarec are some of the politicians accused of having "uncles from behind the scenes". The phrase was also occasionally used by former PM and President Borut Pahor, on one occasion accusing the "uncles" of attempting to topple his premiership. Milan Kučan, who is most often accused of being the foremost "uncle from behind the scenes", demanded Pahor clarify his insinuation. Pahor also accused his main 2017 presidential election challenger, Marjan Šarec, of being well looked after by the "uncles". Šarec likewise demanded Pahor clarify his statements, but also did not receive an answer.
- Milan Kučan – the former two-time President of Slovenia and last leader of the League of Communists of Slovenia is frequently accused by SDS of exerting supreme covert influence over the Slovenian political sphere. In 2013, SDS alleged that Kučan was acting from behind the scenes to topple the SDS-led government; the allegation was made in a formal letter that the party addressed to multiple foreign institutions. Politicians allegedly under Kučan's influence include former New Slovenia leader Ljudmila Novak and 2018 newcomer Marjan Šarec, former PM Alenka Bratušek and Ljubljana mayor and PS leader Zoran Janković, among others. Janša was fined €12,000 after labelling two female RTV Slovenia journalists as "cheap, used-up prostitutes" of "#pimpMilan [Kučan]" in a tweet, later also receiving a 3-month suspended jail sentence for the offense. During an event marking the handover of the rotating European Council leadership to PM Janša, Commissioner Ursula von der Leyen both opened and closed her speech by quoting Kučan in what was seen as a subtle jibe at Janša's political camp.
- Forum 21 – a Slovenian liberal think tank established by Milan Kučan and attended by prominent members of the Slovenian political and economic elite to discuss relevant problems facing the nation. SDS has accused the think tank of undue influence in appointment and policy decisions of liberal governments.
- Murgle – the upscale Murgle residential district known for its one-story houses is home to many prominent Slovenian political and economic figures, including former liberal presidents Milan Kučan (often the main target of allusions to "Murgle") and Janez Drnovšek (deceased), former PM Miro Cerar, and Liberation Front partisan and last president of the SR Slovenia, Janez Stanovnik, among others. "Murgle" is thus another reference to the alleged behind-the-scenes influence exerted by the country's ostensibly retired leftist elites. Upon being sentenced to a two-year prison sentence in the Patria corruption case, Janez Janša stated that the verdict was "written in advance in Murgle and by known authors". SDS later labelled the 2014 parliamentary election as illegitimate due to the conviction and resulting concurring prison term of Janša. Janša also blamed "Murgle" after prosecutors filed a motion to confiscate Janša's illegally obtained holdings. As part of its 2018 electoral campaign, SDS released an ad where a couple orders pizza delivery from SDS and "Pizza Murgle". The Murgle box is revealed to only contain half a pizza. SDS-affiliated Nova24TV news portal also promoted videos entitled "Murgle Puppet Theatre", which satirically portrayed a closed-door meeting presided over by Milan Kučan discussing political strategy with recently resigned PM Miro Cerar (leader of ruling Modern Centre Party), Agriculture Minister Dejan Židan (leader of the Social Democrats), Foreign Minister Karl Erjavec (leader of DeSUS), and Marjan Šarec (leader of the List of Marjan Šarec).
- First-class and second-class citizens – the Slovenian society is ostensibly divided between the first-class entrenched leftist elites seeking to perpetuate their socioeconomic privileges and stranglehold over the country, and the downtrodden masses of second-class citizens that SDS advocates for. In 2019, Janša published a book of essays entitled First-Class Citizens: A System for the False Elite. The SDS-affiliated TV channel Nova24TV has aired a program named Second-Class Citizens.

== Organization ==
=== Leadership ===
The Social Democratic Party and Slovenian Democratic Party had the following presidents.

- France Tomšič, 1989.
- Jože Pučnik, 1989–1993.
- Janez Janša, 1993–current.

=== Membership ===
As of 2013, SDS membership numbered some 30,000 strong, more than any other political party in Slovenia. Slovenian Democratic Youth (Slovene: Slovenska demokratska mladina, SDM) is the independent and autonomous youth wing of the party.

=== Supporters and affiliates ===
SDS has seen some support from the Slovene Catholic Church. The party enjoys strong support in some Slovene conservative and classical liberal intellectual circles. Public figures who have publicly voiced support for SDS or affiliated themselves with the party include economist Ljubo Sirc (joined the party in 2010), philosopher Ivan Urbančič, historians Vasko Simoniti and Alenka Puhar, writer and essayist Drago Jančar, theologian and philosopher Janez Juhant, and poet Tone Kuntner. Public supporters of the party also include sportsmen Miran Pavlin, and Katja Koren, pop singer Marta Zore, designer and cartoonist Miki Muster, and actor Roman Končar.

In 2008, SDS was found to have falsely attributed "supporter status" to many prominent Slovenes on its webpage. The party sent a request to comment on the ruling government for its party newspaper to numerous notable public figures. Though they were never asked whether they support the party or informed they will be listed as supporters, SDS nevertheless listed them as such.

==== Former supporters and affiliates ====
Many prominent members have abandoned SDS due to the radicalisation of the party's ideology and disagreements over leadership style. Some also established new political parties. Most former members politically transitioned towards the centre, with a minority outflanking SDS on the far right. Former public supporters include: sportsman Miran Pavlin.

Former supporters or affiliated individuals that have since come out as critics of the party include: one of the fathers of the current Slovenian Constitution Peter Jambrek, the former chairman of Rally for the Republic and Civic List party leader Gregor Virant, and liberal economist Jože P. Damijan, former Minister of Foreign Affairs Dimitrij Rupel, former Minister of Internal Affairs Dragutin Mate, and Minister of Education Žiga Turk, former MEP Romana Jordan Cizelj, former SDS MPs Andrej Čuš, and Ivo Hvalica, and "mother of the party" Vera Ban. Miha Brejc became persona non grata after his son-in-law Gregor Virant distanced himself from Janša and established the Civic List.

=== Affiliated organisations ===
The party is affiliated with the Jože Pučnik Institute, the major liberal-conservative think tank in Slovenia. It is also closely affiliated with the civic platform Rally for the Republic (Zbor za republiko).

Committee 2014 (Slovene: Odbor 2014) is a civic organisation that was established to protest and demand the overturn of the corruption convictions in the Patria case, the freeing of SDS leader Janez Janša from prison (sentence resulting from the conviction), and the "actual implementation of the rule of law, human rights, basic freedoms, and establishment of a democratic society". Committee 2014 held regular protests in front of the Higher Court building in Ljubljana.

The Alliance for the Values of Slovene Independence (Slovene: Združenje za vrednote Slovenske osamosvojitve, VSO) is a patriotic veteran non-governmental organisation intended to commemorate the values of the Slovenian independence movement. VSO leadership consists of prominent SDS members and associates. The organisation holds public speaking events, commemorations, and is engaged in other activities as well.

==== Affiliated publications ====
SDS is also affiliated with several current and past publications, including its de facto party publication, Demokracija, and tabloid Škandal24 (both owned by Nova Obzorja (English: "New Horizons") publishing company, which is in turn jointly owned by SDS and a Hungarian publishing company with close ties to Hungary's ruling party, Fidesz). The publishing company has profited from providing literature to, and advising the SDS parliamentary group/SDS MPs (activities for which parliamentary groups receive state funds), and has also benefited financially from doing business with government agencies, which were particularly bountiful while SDS was in government. Nova24TV, a media conglomerate consisting of a television channel and online news portal, was established by SDS MPs and members, and party sympathisers, and later also received financial injections from Hungarian Fidesz-affiliated companies. Additionally, the SDS-friendly political web portal Politikis is also owned and managed by a close SDS associate. Slovenski tednik and Ekspres, free newspapers distributed in the run-up to the 2008 parliamentary election, were also later found to have been directly linked to SDS and its electoral efforts. As with Slovenski tednik and Ekspres, Škandal24 announced it will cease print publication the day after the 2018 parliamentary election, only continuing as an online publication. In late 2017, an array of over a dozen local/regional web news portals with a common template was also set up, with editors of all linked to SDS based on publicly available information. The websites mostly contained informative content, publishing local news with occasional articles that promoted SDS' candidates and narrative/agenda subtly mixed in. The sites may have been set up primarily as a political propaganda effort in anticipation of the 2018 Slovenian local elections.

=== International affiliations ===
The SDS is a member of the International Democracy Union. SDS politicians have participated in the International Visitor Leadership Program, and with the International Republican Institute.

The party is supported by and closely affiliated with former Hungarian Prime Minister Viktor Orbán (Fidesz). SDS's committed backing of Fidesz has reportedly been the decisive factor in preventing Fidesz's expulsion from the European People's Party, resulting in a more lenient suspension. In a letter to the EPP leader, Janša warned of an "inevitable" split in the EPP if the vote to expel Fidesz were to take place. The 3rd Janša government began reorienting Slovenia's foreign alliances away from core EU countries and towards the Visegrád Group of countries, with Janša calling the countries "our friends in the region".

In 2024, when the Hungarian Prime Minister Viktor Orbán (Fidesz) formed the Patriots for Europe, a new EU political group. The SDS, which has four MEPs, ultimately remained part of the EPP Group, while noting that not all SDS MEPs agreed with this decision.

== Public profile ==
=== Controversies and criticism ===
In March 2021, the association of state prosecutors of Slovenia addressed a letter to the Council of Europe to voice their concerns about government pressure on prosecutors (including by PM Janša, and SDS-affiliated media). The third Janša government refused to confirm the appointment of delegated prosecutors to the EU public prosecutors office that is to scrutinise potential misuse of EU funds (both nominees had previously made prosecutorial decisions that were politically disfavourable to SDS, with one having helped bring graft charges against Janša), as well as refusing to confirm 14 prosecutors nominated by the judiciary leading to understaffing of the state prosecutorship. PM Janša also pressured the chief state prosecutor to pursue criminal charges against anti-government protesters who used a slogan that Janša interpreted as a death threat to him and his supporters, admonishing him in a missive that "[He] will be directly responsible for any potential victim of the organised death threats."

In June 2021, the top officials of four independent state oversight institutions issued a joint statement warning of persistent political pressure, impeding their work.

In 2021, articles published in The New York Times, and in Der Standard described SDS as waging a culture war by trying to shift the country's museums in a more conservative and patriotic direction by appointing like-minded people in leadership positions within the institutions.

=== Freedom of the press ===
SDS holds that Slovenian news media is biased and favours the left. Shortly after assuming the role of PM for the third time, SDS leader Janez Janša published an essay entitled "War with the media" in which he expounded his views on countering an oppositional news media, concluding that the battle against the "monopoly of lies" cannot be won without a fight.

SDS and their allies have cultivated an ecosystem of party-aligned media outlets that include a TV channel, news websites (including a number of regional news websites), magazines, a tabloid, and a press agency. There was also an effort to set up a radio station. Some of the party's media endeavours were strategically undertaken just prior to upcoming elections; regional news websites began operating prior to local elections, for example. SDS-affiliated outlets have been accused of false reporting and fake news, of publishing hateful and defamatory content, and of publishing racist, xenophobic, homophobic, and antisemitic content. Some SDS-affiliated media projects have received financial backing from businesses affiliated with the party's political ally, Hungarian PM Viktor Orbán.

Janša has also adopted a pugnacious approach to media relations, aggressively responding to almost every critical foreign press article on the political situation in Slovenia under his leadership. SDS has been criticised for their adversarial approach to media relations, which not only chilled media freedom in the country, but also created a climate where personal attacks, harassment, and threats are commonplace for journalists that have landed in the party's crosshairs. In a letter to top EU officials, various media freedom organisations also warned that PM Janša could use his European presidency position to "attack journalists" across the EU and normalise such behaviour among EU functionaries.

First Janša cabinet: During Janša's first government, the party was accused of gaining influence over multiple public and private outlets, and pulling advertising from state-owned companies from outlets that reported critically about the government. To bring the country's largest newspaper under its control, Janša personally arranged a corrupt deal with the owner of the newspaper in which state assets were traded in exchange for editorial control over the newspaper.

Third Janša cabinet: Shortly after Janša's third government took office, a loyalist (who had been previously appointed editor-in-chief of the country's largest newspaper during Janša's first government, reportedly in a secret corrupt deal between Janša and the newspaper's owner) was appointed to head SiOL, a media subsidiary of a state-owned telecom, despite receiving the approval of only 2 members of the 42-member editorial board. In fall of 2020, the state telecom commenced the sale of TSMedia which owns SiOL. In May 2021, the board of directors of the telecom abruptly halted the sale after a Hungarian business with ties to Hungary's ruling party Fidesz (which is closely allied with SDS) was outbid 2 million € to 5 million € by another bidder.

In May 2020, the government replaced 7 board members of the public broadcaster RTV Slovenia, shifting the political balance of power of the board in favour of the government and foreshadowing a push to replace the leadership of the institution. In October 2020, board members close to SDS and the government began an attempt to replace the then general director of the institution before the end of his term, citing poor financial management and attacks on government representatives. Commenting on the replacement push, the director said the attempt was motivated by a desire to purge RTV of journalists critical of the government. The vote to replace the director was held in November, and failed by 1 vote. With the end of the regular term of the previous director approaching, a new general director was elected in January 2021, to take office in April. While SDS failed to field a loyal candidate, votes of board members close to the government were decisive in picking the new head. Shortly after a new RTV director was chosen, PM Janša commented on a clip of RTV footage with "hopefully the new broom will fix such false reporting", leading to fears that the new director will be beholden to the government after its board members supported his nomination.

During the summer of 2020, the government proposed new media laws that would increase the government's influence over the state-owned press agency Slovenian Press Agency (STA), and redirect some funds from the public broadcaster to an SDS-affiliated TV channel. The proposed legislation failed to gain traction after facing objections from all coalition partners. After STA refused to provide a government agency with business information and explanations about editorial decisions (STA argued the government agency lacked legal authority to demand such information), the government, in an unprecedented move, halted financing the news agency, saying STA had failed to meet its contractual obligations. The loss of state financing - some half of its total revenue - imperiled STA's continued existence. All coalition partners called for the resumption of STA financing. In early 2021, the government proposed draft legislation that would move STA into a centrally managed pension wealth fund, granting the government greater sway over the news agency. In March 2021, Janša called on the STA director to resign before the end of his term, calling him a "tool of the far left" who should be "held responsible for his unlawful actions". Janša also said that STA has been "selling lies as truth" under his leadership. The government also called on the STA board of directors to dismiss the director, and drafted a report accusing the director of dereliction of duty and wrongdoing in his official role. The government then requested the Interior Ministry to look into whether the findings of the report warrant a criminal investigation of the director. Police investigators subsequently questioned a STA board member and representatives of STA and the Dnevnik newspaper (due to an advertisement contract with STA), with the latter stating that the investigators asked for information that constituted business secrets, which Dnevnik refused to furnish.

In May 2021, after a criminal complaint was lodged by the government, police launched an investigation of Mladina for allegedly publishing classified information. The weekly published the contents of an internal government document (which was released to the public within a fortnight). The magazine responded by claiming the publication of the document was in the public interest (and thus legal) and that the government illegitimately restricted access to the document, and said the probe was intimidation.

PM Janša furtively met with the owner of POP TV's parent company (the Czechia-based PPF group) in late 2020. According to people present at the meeting with knowledge of the discussion, Janša spent most of the meeting complained about POP TV's political coverage. A deal was reportedly struck with the owners of POP TV (the most influential national TV broadcaster which also operates the most frequently visited web news portal in the country), granting lucrative government infrastructure contracts and stakes in state-owned enterprises in exchange for favourable coverage. After the meeting, the parent company begun to closely monitor POP TV's political reporting to ensure coverage is sufficiently favourable to the SDS-led government, requiring news editors to translate transcripts into Czech and send them to headquarters in Prague. Employees of the media company confirmed mounting editorial pressure in anonymous interviews. SDS was reportedly also engineering a sale of the country's largest newspaper Delo to PPF from its domestic owner to also reign in its critical coverage, using lucrative state contracts and benefits as enticements/punishments.

In May 2021, the Ministry of Culture, which is responsible for distributing a fixed amount of financial aid to media organisations, denied funding requests from multiple mainstream media organisations that had consistently received funding in the past (due to ostensibly unbalanced coverage) while newly apportioning the funds to multiple conservative and pro-government media organisations (multiple of which had ties to government parties); nearly all requests from conservative and pro-government media were granted. The criteria for distributing the funds had not changed. The committee responsible for distributing the funds was mostly composed of individuals with ties to SDS. The minister of culture described the shift in funding as a step towards a more balanced media environment.

SDS's aggressiveness towards national and international news media and journalists has caused concern and drawn reprimands from EU politicians and institutions as Janša is poised to take over the leadership of the rotating EU Council presidency during the second half of 2021. In March 2021, the US State Department said it was monitoring the state of the news media in Slovenia. A deterioration in press freedoms in the country under the new government was subsequently noted in the State Department's international Human Rights report for 2020 published later the same month; media freedom was described as one of the key human rights concerns in Slovenia. The issue of media freedom in Slovenia came under discussion of the European Parliament and its Democracy, Rule of Law and Fundamental Rights Monitoring Group (DRFMG). The first discussion was held on March 5 under the auspices of DRFMG; PM Janša and Culture Minister Vasko Simoniti were invited to participate but declined. The issue was also discussed by the EP during a plenary session some days later. DRFMG again discussed the issue on March 26, with the invitation to join again extended to the Slovene PM and Culture Minister. Janša initially joined discussion, but demanded a video be shown to the committee. Janša then abruptly left the videoconference after a heated exchange with the committee chair that denied his request. Janša later wrote on Twitter that he was censored by the committee. A Council of Europe Commissioner for Human Rights report published in June 2021 found a deterioration of press freedom in Slovenia and called on the Slovene government to remedy the situation. PM Janša, responding to the report by tweet, called the Commissioner a "[...] part of #fakenews network. Well paid by our money."

=== Astroturfing and satellite parties ===
SDS reportedly operates a network of fake social media accounts used to amplify its message and attack opponents. In February 2021, an SDS MP was revealed to operate a fake Twitter account. SDS has been reported to operate a "multimedia centre" from within its party headquarters from where party operatives engage in social media battles with political opponents and promote the party online. The party's online activities intensify prior to elections. A disgruntled former SDS MP publicly corroborated the existence of the "multimedia centre" after leaving the party, claiming he personally used to participate in the party's media operations. There have also been claims that all SDS political candidates are required to set up a Twitter account.

In 2019, a former SDS politician published a screenshot of private messages from Janša after a public falling-out between the two. In the messages, Janša asked her to organise astroturfed protests in front of the parliament during a parliamentary deliberation about a referendum on immigration, saying "protests are effective if the action comes from below and looks like a spontaneous uprising".

SDS has been accused of orchestrating the creation of at least five satellite parties in attempts to sure up a larger swath of the electorate and secure loyal coalition partners, and undermine competing parties.

=== Ties to far-right groups ===
SDS has been criticised for alleged links to a neo-Nazi extremist group; the Slovene branch of Blood & Honour. The journalist who uncovered the links (Anuška Delić) was charged with leaking confidential information. The state intelligence agency, SOVA, headed by an SDS appointee at the time of the indictment, inadvertently confirmed allegations made by Delić by stating that the information revealed in the reports was consistent with findings of an ongoing investigation into the activities of the violent extremist group. SOVA argued that the information revealed in the reports could not have been obtained by any other means than by gaining access to information collected during the agency's covert investigations, and that the publication disrupted its efforts to monitor the group by alerting B & H of the monitoring efforts. Delić alleged the charges were "politically motivated".

Some Blood & Honour members were allegedly also members of SDS, and formally met with SDS MP Branko Grims. The group (the members of which allegedly received training by members of the Slovenian armed forces on an army training area, borrowed army weaponry (a rocket launcher), attempted to purchase handguns, and were in direct correspondence with Anders Breivik by both mail and e-mail, with multiple B & H members receiving his manifesto before Breivik's killing spree) was allegedly intimately implicated in orchestrating the violent riots which took place amid the 2012–13 Slovenian protests. The organised group of violent agitators that disrupted a major protest in Ljubljana was found to have been trained, hired, and compensated, possibly by a political party, according to a police investigation.

More recently, SDS has also fostered ties with Generation Identity Slovenia, the Slovenian chapter of the far-right Identitarian movement organisations. In August 2018, the party's publishing company, New Horizons, anonymously published the Slovene Identitarians' alt-right book, Manifesto for the Homeland. The book was also promoted by SDS-affiliated media organisations and individuals, including SDS leader Janez Janša, with SDS MP Žan Mahnič even going so far as to post on Twitter a photo of the book taken from his parliamentary seat, with the floor of the parliamentary chamber in the background. SDS also organised a joint panel discussion on migrations with Generation Identity, and Generation Identity was advertised on an SDS-affiliated TV channel. The leader of the Austrian Identitarians, Martin Sellner, publicly thanked Janša for his support on Twitter. Sellner was at the time being investigated by Austrian authorities and ostracised by the ruling conservative Freedom Party of Austria for his financial ties with the Christchurch terrorist.

During the 2020 Slovenian anti-government protests against the Third Janša government, a pro-government counter-protester group (the "Yellow Wests") was favourably covered in SDS-affiliated media, with the articles in which the Yellow Wests called on the public to join them shared by PM Janša on Twitter. 8 of the 30-some original Yellow Wests (including their spokesman) were found to have links to neo-Nazism. In 2021, the group forcefully disrupted an anti-government rally in the vicinity of a state ceremony attended by multiple foreign prime ministers. Riot police removed the provocators to avoid a massive brawl.

=== Political self-dealing accusations ===
The party has been accused of political self-dealing and nepotism, appointing relatives, allies, and friends to government (and other) positions. Many close relatives of prominent SDS members have found employment in the Slovenian and European parliaments, high ranking public sector positions, and state-owned companies (some despite not meeting the official job requirements).

SDS has been accused of political firings and replacements in, and selective financing of many institutions under the public sphere, and creating an environment where politisation of the public workplace was permissible and pervasive while in power.

=== Cult of personality ===
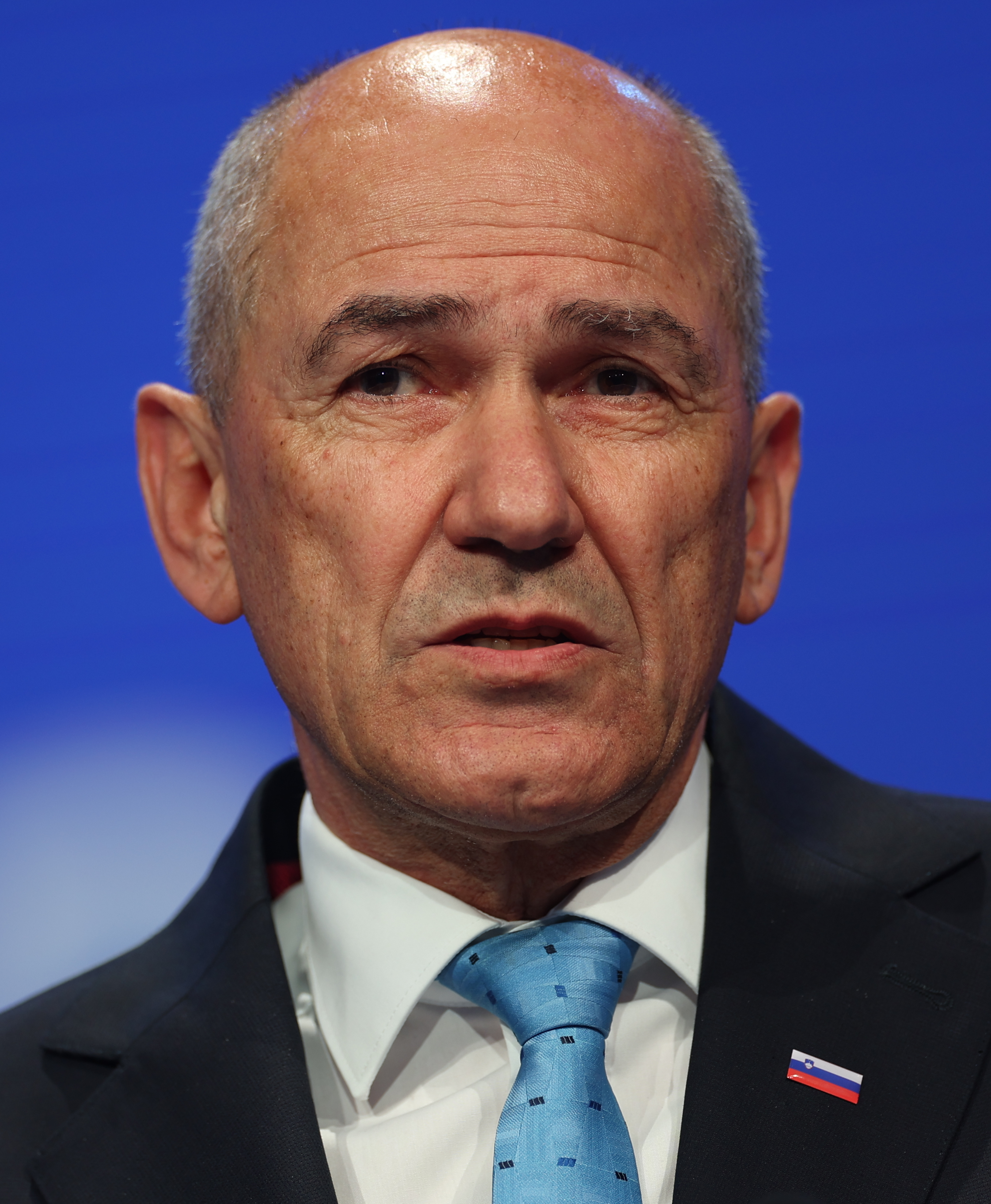
Janez Janša has led the SDS since 1993

SDS leader Janez Janša has continuously served as party head since May 1993 without a single other contender for the post. Party members are extremely loyal to Janša; it has been noted that the party appears to resemble a cult, with numerous past members claiming that Janša leads the party in an authoritarian manner and that no dissent is tolerated. SDS MEP Romana Jordan Cizelj was reportedly the only one within the party leadership to openly voice her doubts about Janša's continued leadership of the party whilst serving a prison sentence for corruption. Jordan Cizelj was subsequently not allowed to run for re-election as MEP on the SDS ticket as punishment for her disloyalty to Janša.

=== Campaign financing impropriety allegations ===
In the run-up to the 2018 Slovenian parliamentary election, SDS attempted to receive a loan of €450,000 from an individual residing in Bosnia and Herzegovina to fund its electoral campaign. The party came into contact with the individual via Nova obzorja publishing company (partially owned by SDS). SDS also put up its share in Nova obzorja as collateral. The sum borrowed exceeded limits set by campaign finance laws, however, and SDS was obliged to return the borrowed funds. A police and financial court investigation was also triggered after the terms of the loan became public. An investigation into the lender was also launched, based on suspicions of money laundering, tax avoidance, destruction and falsification of business documents, and overseeing dummy companies. The individual was allegedly a part of a criminal organisation managing dummy companies that received funds of undisclosed origins (including the funds later loaned to SDS).

Less than a week before the 2018 parliamentary election took place, it was revealed that media/publishing companies closely affiliated and partially owned by SDS received some €800,000 from two Hungarian nationals (or, rather, their companies) - both with close ties to Hungarian Prime Minister Viktor Orbán - months before the election, bringing the total amount SDS-affiliated media companies received from Hungarian entities to over €2.2M. The SDS-affiliated media companies that received the funds in turn purchased campaign adds for SDS. Nova obzorja publishing company also attempted to loan €60,000 to the party. The same Hungarian individuals also provided funds for political allies in Macedonia. It is furthermore also known that the loan SDS attempted to obtain from a Bosnian citizen some months earlier had a Hungarian connection. SDS-controlled media companies have reportedly also served as a conduit for Hungarian financing of media in North Macedonia to prop up Orban's political allies there. Of the at least €4M in Hungarian moneys that were reportedly originally funneled into SDS-affiliated media between mid-2018 and early 2020, over €2.5M was then channeled to Macedonian news media entities favourable to the right-wing VMRO-DPMNE party.

=== Discriminatory remarks ===
After the 2011 parliamentary elections, which saw the victory of Ljubljana mayor Zoran Janković (who is of Serbian descent) and his party, a contribution published on the official SDS webpage by a "Tomaž Majer" caused considerable public outrage. Majer states that Janković was elected by "well-disciplined new citizens" living in "high-rise neighbourhoods", tracksuit-clad voters with foreign accents arriving at polling places in groups holding notes with instructions on whom to vote for. These "new citizens" were allegedly mobilised by being admonished their citizenship will be revoked if "the right" is elected. Majer further states that one of his acquaintances (who is of Bosnian descent) was even offered monetary reward to vote for Janković. Majer also claims that the roughly 1/3 of Janković voters of Slovenian descent were ordered to vote for PS by Milan Kučan and Janez Stanovnik. Several media organisations attempted to identify the author, but were unsuccessful. It has been speculated that the real author of the text was in fact Janez Janša, based on similar known past statements (specifically, his 1993 commentary on the poor electoral performance of SDS during the 1992 elections). In the wake of the 2011 election, Janša and several other SDS MPs and candidates expressed similar but somewhat toned-down nationalistic sentiments while commenting on the election and its winner. The public reaction culminated in a "March of the Tracksuits", a rally where participants attended clothed in tracksuits to protest against division and intolerance.

SDS MP Branko Grims, speaking to a gathering of a ultranationalist group in early 2018, said "Now is the era of Trump. He is the greatest thorn in the foot of the globalists, who control the US mechanisms, with Soros at the helm. Soros is the symbol of this. But there's also the Rothschilds and many other wealthiest families of financial speculators."

SDS MP Marijan Pojbič, in a 2017 Statehood Day address on Facebook, called for "No more mayors that aren't real Slovenes, and even fewer national politicians who aren't real Slovenes by birth."

In 2020, SDS politician Žan Mahnič, a former MP then serving as national security state secretary, shared a tweet of an image of white-skinned women with different hair colours accompanied with the comment "This is all the diversity Europe needs." The original author of the tweet was a user using the screen name "franca - EtnoNacionalist". Mahnič was subsequently criticised for promoting racism.

In 2021, Prime Minister Janša shared a tweet saying that the amount "death, suffering, repression, desolation and societal backwardness" caused by The Communist Manifesto is second only to the Quran. The tweet was condemned by the Slovenian Muslim community, and the Turkish national broadcaster TRT. Janša defended sharing the tweet by noting that his Twitter profile bio says re-tweets are not endorsements.

== Election results ==
=== National Assembly ===
Election	Leader	Votes	%	Seats	+/–	Government
1990	Jože Pučnik	79,951	7.39 (#7)	6 / 80	▲6	Coalition
1992	Jože Pučnik	39,675	3.34 (#8)	4 / 90	▼2	Coalition
1996	Janez Janša	172,470	16.13 (#3)	16 / 90	▲12	Opposition
2000	Janez Janša	170,228	15.81 (#2)	14 / 90	▼2	Opposition
2004	Janez Janša	281,710	29.08 (#1)	29 / 90	▲15	Coalition
2008	Janez Janša	307,735	29.26 (#2)	28 / 90	▼1	Opposition
2011	Janez Janša	288,719	26.19 (#2)	26 / 90	▼2	Coalition 2012–13
2011	Janez Janša	288,719	26.19 (#2)	26 / 90	▼2	Opposition 2013–14
2014	Janez Janša	181,052	20.71 (#2)	21 / 90	▼5	Opposition
2018	Janez Janša	222,042	24.92 (#1)	25 / 90	▲4	Opposition 2018–20
2018	Janez Janša	222,042	24.92 (#1)	25 / 90	▲4	Coalition 2020–22
2022	Janez Janša	279,897	23.48 (#2)	27 / 90	▲2	Opposition
2026	Janez Janša	328,923	27.88 (#2)	28 / 90	▲1	Coalition

=== European Parliament ===
Election	List leader	Votes	%	Seats	+/–	EP Group
2004	Mihael Brejc	76,945	17.65 (#3)	2 / 7	New	EPP-ED
2009	Milan Zver	123,563	26.66 (#1)	3 / 8	▲1	EPP
2014	Milan Zver	99,643	24.78 (#1)	3 / 8	0	EPP
2019 (Note: Run in a joint list with SLS.)	Milan Zver	126,534	26.25 (#1)	2 / 8	▼1	EPP
2024	Romana Tomc	205,084	30.61 (#1)	4 / 9	▲2	EPP

=== Presidential ===
Election	Candidate	1st round		2nd round		Result
Election	Candidate	Votes	%	Votes	%	Result
1992	France Tomšič	7,849	0.63			Lost
1997 (Note: In coalition with Slovene Christian Democrats)	Jožef Bernik	98,996	9.50			Lost
2007 (Note: In coalition with New Slovenia and Slovenian People's Party)	Lojze Peterle	283,412	28.73	318,288	31.97	Lost
2012 (Note: In coalition with New Slovenia)	Milan Zver	198,337	24.25			Lost
2017	Romana Tomc	102,925	13.68			Lost
2022	Anže Logar	296,000	33.95	414,029	46.11	Lost

== General sources ==
- Bakke, Elisabeth (2010). "Central and East European party systems since 1989". In Sabrina Ramet (ed.). Central and Southeast European Politics Since 1989. Cambridge University Press. ISBN 9781139487504.
