= Intelligence and Security Service of the Ministry of Defence (Slovenia) =

The Intelligence and Security Service of the Ministry of Defence (ISS MoD) is a directorate within the MoD. It reports directly to the Defence Minister, who has the same powers as Director of the Slovene Intelligence and Security Agency (SOVA) or Director General of the Police, in implementing special forms of information collection. The ISS MoD is allowed to independently exchange intelligence with foreign partner services and to directly inform the Prime Minister and President of the Republic about its findings.

== Intelligence and counterintelligence tasks ==
Collection, documentation and analysis of information and data relevant to defense interests of the state, as well as protection of such data, with a special emphasis on:

- Determination and assessment of the military and political-security situation within the state and military capabilities outside the state that are of special importance to state security;
- Collection and assessment of data on the situation in areas where members of the Slovenian Armed Forces (SAF) execute international obligations or perform military service;
- Detection and prevention of activities of intelligence services of military organizations or other bodies and organizations that pose a threat to defense interests of the state, SAF or MoD.

== Security tasks ==
- Detection, investigation and prevention of threat to the security of certain persons, jobs, facilities and surroundings used by the MoD or SAF in or outside the state, as well as data on development or production of certain military weapons or equipment;
- Investigation of criminal acts in line with the Police Act;
- Reviewing and suggesting solutions to physical and technical protection;
- Operational protection of certain persons, jobs, facilities and surroundings that are of special importance to defence;
- Carrying out vetting procedures in line with the national legislation;
- Directing activities of the military police when performing certain security tasks in line with the Defence Act.

== Powers ==
- Special operational methods and means (SOVA, ISS MoD, Police) – old terminology.
- Covert cooperation and special forms of information collection (SOVA, ISS MoD).
- Special investigative measures (Police, ISS MoD).
- Provision of intelligence support to the SAF, MoD and Government.
- Provision of counterintelligence support to the SAF and MoD.
- Provision of security support to the SAF and MoD.
- Has the status of a directorate within the MoD.
- Forms part of the Slovenian intelligence-security system.

Upon approval by the Defence Minister, ISS MoD can exchange intelligence with foreign services and directly informs the Prime Minister and/or President of the Republic about its findings.

Collection, documentation and analysis of information relevant to defence interests of the state, as well as protection of such information, with a special emphasis on:

- Determination and assessment of the military and political-security situation and military capabilities outside the state that are of special importance to the security of the state;
- Collection and assessment of information on the situation in the areas where members of the Slovenian Armed Forces (SAF) implement the undertaken international obligations or perform military service;
- Detection and prevention of activities of intelligence services of military organizations or other bodies and organizations that pose a threat to defence interests of the state, SAF or MoD.

Detection, investigation and prevention of threat to the security of certain persons, jobs, facilities and surroundings used by the MoD or SAF in or outside the state, as well as data on development or production of certain military weapons systems or equipment;

- Investigation of criminal acts in line with the Police Act;
- Reviewing and suggesting solutions to physical and technical protection;
- Operational protection of certain persons, jobs, facilities and surroundings that are of special importance to defence;
- Carrying out vetting procedures in line with the national legislation;
- Directing activities of the military police when performing certain security tasks in line with the Defence Act.

== Oversight ==
The work of ISS MoD is under constant oversight, emphasizing the protection of human rights and fundamental freedoms, legality, and professional competences.

ISS is overseen by the Parliamentary Oversight Commission, the Government, the Court of Audits and Budget Supervision Office, the public, and the Information Commissioner. Apart from the external oversight, the ISS is also subject to internal oversight.

It is mandatory for ISS to report to the Parliamentary Oversight Commission about its general activities every four months or more frequently, if necessary.
