= Slovenian Intelligence and Security Agency =

Security Agency

The Slovenian Intelligence and Security Agency (Slovene: Slovenska obveščevalno-varnostna agencija; SOVA or Sova, pronounced [ˈsɔ̀ːʋa]; lit. Owl) is the main civilian intelligence service of Slovenia and as a government agency is subordinated directly to the Prime Minister of Slovenia. The mission of SOVA as the central intelligence and security service in the Republic of Slovenia is to provide national security. The agency's headquarters are located at Stegne Street in Dravlje, northwest of Ljubljana's centre.

Its military counterpart is the Intelligence and Security Service (Slovene: Obveščevalno-varnostna služba; OVS), which is part of the Ministry of Defense.

== History ==
SOVA traces its origins to the State Security Service (Slovene: Uprava službe državne varnosti; SDV), which was formed in 1966 when Slovenia was still within Yugoslavia, by renaming as the State Security Administration. On 9 May 1991 the service was renamed as the Security and Information Service (Slovene: Varnostno-informativna služba; VIS). Renaming to the current name was performed on 17 June 1993, at which time the agency was transferred from the Ministry of Internal Affairs to the Government of Slovenia.

In December 2022, following a tip from foreign intelligence services, SOVA discovered two Russian spies posing as Argentine citizens Maria Rosa Mayer Muños and Ludwik Gisch, whose personas they had been building for over 10 years and who had been using Slovenia as a base for operations in and around the country. After wiretapping and tracking, they discovered that the suspects family and companies were just a front, their real names being Ana Dulceva and Artem Dulcev. In Slovenia, their main target was the European Agency for the Cooperation of Energy Regulators, while abroad they led other agents. An important part of their mission was to reduce public support for NATO and spread Russian narratives and disinformation. The spies were sentenced to prison, after which they were deported and included in an exchange for various individuals imprisoned in Russia. The Dultsevs and their children were flown to Moscow as part of the biggest swap of Western and Russian prisoners since the Cold War. U.S President Joe Biden has publicly commended Slovenia. At the same time, after the Russian invasion of Ukraine in 2022, SOVA monitored an increase in the number of unusually old Russian "students", eight of whom were later expelled for spreading Russian propaganda and impersonating Slovenian officials.

== Directors ==
- Miha Brejc (1990–1993)
- Janez Sirše (1993)
- Silvan Jakin (1993)
- Drago Ferš (1993–1999)
- Tomaž Lovrenčič (2000–2002)
- Iztok Podbregar (2002−2006)
- Matjaž Šinkovec (2006−2007)
- Andrej Rupnik (2007 − 22 July 2010)
- Sebastjan Selan (22 July 2010 − 10 February 2012)
- Damir Črnčec (10 February 2012 − March 2013)
- Stane Štemberger (March 2013 – October 2014)
- Andrej Oček (October 2014 – November 2014)
- Zoran Klemenčič (November 2014 – September 2018)
- Rajko Kozmelj (September 2018 – March 2020)
- Janez Stušek (April 2020 – )

== Controversies ==
=== Illegal wiretapping of an Italian diplomat (1991) ===
Before the Ten-Day War the then VIS recorded a phone call between a member of the Slovenian Presidency Ciril Zlobec and the Italian consul, during which Zlobec informed the Italian consul of the date of the Slovenian Declaration of Independence.

=== Illegal wiretapping of opposition (1991−1993) ===
Under the Brejc period some leading members of the LDS party were recorded.

=== Black fund (2002−2006) ===
After Iztok Podbregar was replaced as director by the new government in 2006, a special investigation team under the leadership of the new Minister of Justice Lovro Šturm was formed with the task of reviewing the agency's activities. The investigation found an undocumented black fund, which was used to cover non-traditional cancer treatments for then-President Janez Drnovšek, as well as the purchase of expensive retirement presents, establishment of companies, among other things. The investigation team also revealed that SOVA was wiretapping over 3000 foreign telephone numbers, and was recording telephone conversations between the Slovenian and Croatian Prime Ministers.

=== Safe house exposed (2007) ===
In March 2007, the daily newspaper Dnevnik exposed SOVA's safe house in the centre of Ljubljana, while writing about a visit to it by SOVA's director Matjaž Šinkovec and the PM's consultant Aleksander Lavrih. After this the agency's collaboration with the German Bundesnachrichtendienst regarding telecommunications tapping in the Western Balkans was also exposed.

=== Exposed photos (2011) ===
In September 2011 about 80 photos of former UDBA agents with retired and current SOVA agents were published on several internet sites; these photos were taken during a picnic, while some agents were drunk and displaying communist symbols. Among them was also Zvonko Hrastar, ex-agent (and husband of state prosecutor Branka Zobec Hrastar), who in 1988 arrested Janez Janša (future defense and prime minister) and with this started the JBTZ trial.

=== Expensive furniture (2012) ===
In March 2012 it was revealed that former director Sebastjan Selan ordered expensive furniture (in excess of €112,000) for his executive-level 5-bedroom apartment, which was intended for high level international meetings. This was done while the government was imposing budget cutbacks. The new director Damir Črnčec discontinued his use of the apartment and ordered an internal review.

=== Accusations of political bias (2013) ===
In January 2013, the Commission for the prevention of corruption of the Republic of Slovenia received an indictment, that was also sent to the President of the Republic, and to the parliamentary Commission for Supervision of Intelligence and Security Services, the agency may be politically biased because after 2011 the leading positions were taken by members of Janez Janša's political party, the Slovenian Democratic Party.
