= List of candidates in the 2018 Slovenian parliamentary election =

A total of 1,656 candidates contested the 2018 Slovenian parliamentary election, five of them for the positions of representatives of national minorities.

== Nationwide ==
List of candidates for 2018 Slovene parliamentary elections:

=== Andrej Čuš and the Greens of Slovenia (AČZS) ===
	AČZS	Andrej Čuš and the Greens of Slovenia; Andrej Čuš in Zeleni Slovenije										77 candidates
#	Constituency	Electoral districts										
#	Constituency	1	2	3	4	5	6	7	8	9	10	11
1	Kranj	Faris Kočan	Irena Kolbl	Silva Pisek	Danica Kokošar	Dolores Primožič	Francelj Gašper	Zorica Škorc		Rok Frelih	Jaka Ptrovič	Ivo Firbac
2	Postojna	Biljana Vrbnjak Vinković	Onelio Bernetič	Valter Krmac	Mirja Gregorič		Katarina Dea Žetko	Andrej Fric	Sava Vuković	Marjeta Bešter	Valter Škapin Rola	Alenka Viceljo
3	Ljubljana-Center	Marija Gale	Gorazd Pretnar	Marjan Zakrajšek	/	Urška Mihalinec	Tomaž Ogrin	Vlado Čuš	Damjan Lukić	Miha Jazbinšek	Barbara Kapelj	Dragan Djukić
4	Ljubljana-Bežigrad	luka Pogačar	Mojca Bojc	Aleš Praznik	Gregor Zavrl	Jure Kutoš	Branko Simić	Tina Fink	Anja Novak	Jelka Žugelj	Gregor Horvatič	Tomaž Štebe
5	Celje	Mira Zajec	Ines Deželak	Sebastijan Kamenik	Anja Vanesa Pečnak		Nika Koštomaj	Boris Andrej Mlakar		Aleš Mlač-Černe	Zoran Rožič	
6	Novo mesto	Gea Dobravec	Zvonko Lah MP	Igor Sladič	Zvonko Lah MP (2)	Andrej Špan	Samantha Ferlež	Marko Mitja Gefuš	Nuša Naglič	Adrijana Tomić		Patrik Polc
7	Maribor	Robert Golež	Gvido Novak	Nina Beškovnik	Samo Trs	Miha Jesenek	Boštjan Munda	Barbara Cenčič Krajnc	Rok Zalar	Maja Roner	Barbara Cenčič Krajnc (2)	Monika Piberl
8	Ptuj	Rado Antolič		Nataša Kozic Šic	Patricija Kekec	Dejan Habjanič	Tea Koračin	Andrej Kocbek	Tamara Farazin	Andrej Čuš MP		Jernej Čuš

=== Democratic Party of Pensioners of Slovenia (DeSUS) ===
	DeSUS	Democratic Party of Pensioners of Slovenia; Demokratična stranka upokojencev Slovenije										88 candidates
#	Constituency	Electoral districts										
#	Constituency	1	2	3	4	5	6	7	8	9	10	11
1	Kranj	Božena Ronner	Anton Urh	Marjeta Rozman	Rok Igličar	Marko Petrić	Ana Cimperman	Karl Erjavec	Viktor Zadnik	Jože Petrovčič	Julijana Bizjak Mlakar MP	Milan Janez Božič
2	Postojna	Vanessa Marcola	Robert Smrekar	Branko Simonovič	Katja Diraka Rehak	Zoran Markuža	Ljubislava Škibin	Miranda Vrh	Sabina Ileršič	Zlatko Martin Marušič	Aleš Dugulin	Jožef Velikonja
3	Ljubljana-Center	Gregor Pokleka	Primož Hainz MP	Nevenka Dolgan	Alojzija Strle	Muharem Hisuć	Dorotea Verša Paić	Lado Leskovar	Saša Dončič	Zlatko Božič	Miroslav Kupeljnik	Marija Ana Radaković
4	Ljubljana-Bežigrad	Peter Vilfan MP	Nina Stankovič	Milan Vehovec	Matjaž Juvančič	Nedeljko Tegeltija	Marija Horvat	Franc Vrečič	Fani Preskar	Liljana Leskovic	Bojan Arh	Anton Peršak
5	Celje	Robert Polnar	Brigita Čokl	Jožef Prevolšek	Zdenka Jan	Marjan Vodeb	Margareta Atelšek	Franc Rogan	Darja Štraus	Almira Kočnik	Štefan Skitek	Benedikt Kopmajer MP
6	Novo mesto	Silvo Grdešič	Dušan Pavlič	Vesna Dragan	Branka Kastelic	Robert Sotler	Vlado Bezjak	Jožef Žnidarič	Bojan Bukovec	Ivan Hršak MP	Lea Hlebec	Anica Ule Maček
7	Maribor	Vjekoslav Javorić	Irena Majcen	Milena Brečko Poklič	Jurij Lep	Franc Lobnik	Jani Kavtičnik	Stanislava Naterer	Tatjana Mileta	Franc Slavinec	Jelka Kolmanič	Uroš Prikl MP
8	Ptuj	Robert Berki	Emil Kumer	Franc Jurša MP	Cvetka Vereš	Venčeslav Smodiš	Drago Kocbek	Andrejka Majhen	Drago Matjašič	Marta Tušek	Aleksandra Pivec	Marko Maučič

=== Economic Active Party (GAS) ===
	GAS	Economic Active Party; Gospodarsko aktivna stranka										68
#	Constituency	Electoral districts										
#	Constituency	1	2	3	4	5	6	7	8	9	10	11
1	Kranj	Eva Goričan	Anja Novak		Gregor Grašič		Drago Goričan		Alojz Kobe	Hinko Debelak	Branko Kovač	Katarina Kovšca
2	Postojna	Sava Kavčič	Nataliya Chubar		Mirko Tomšič	Jožef Rojc	Marina Fornazarič	Iris Zajec	Andrej Benko	Milan Fornazarič	Boris Nemec	Aleš Bone
3	Ljubljana-Center	Marko Mlakar	Rosanka Prestor Benko	Momčilo Lalić		Veronika Glasnović	Simon Kastelec	Nejc Kobe	Andreja More		Nino Katona	
4	Ljubljana-Bežigrad	Milan Lampe	Borut Kričej	Polona Adamlje Kresnik	Alojz Kovšca	Magdalena Kravos	Mojca Grilanc		Magdalena Zupanc	Alojz Kovšca (2)	Borut Perko	
5	Celje	Manja Kamšak	Marjetka Tratnik Volasko		Stanko Bevc	Albin Kač	Manja Holobar	Darko Koželj		Mitja Koželj		Tomislav Pirjevec
6	Novo mesto	Janez Murin	Jože Kobe		Drago Papež	Iztok Vorkapić		Brane Vovko	Alenka Papež		Irena Štangelj Pavlakovič	Mihaela Turk
7	Maribor	Anton Turk	Zorislava Pokrivač Bratuša	Danijela Marjanović	Alojz Buček	Alojz Vrbnjak	Zorislava Pokrivač Bratuša (2)	Marija Andrejčič	Maja Buček		Alojz Vrbnjak (2)	Alojz Buček (2)
8	Ptuj	Maja Kobe	Kristina Vargazon	Daniel Vargazon	Valetin Trajbar	Anja Sever	Ernest Bransberger	Ivica Brulc	Rudi Matjašič	Slavko Šega	Milan Zamuda	Slavko Šega

=== For a Healthy Society (ZZD) ===
	ZZD	For a Healthy Society; Za zdravo družbo										52 candidates
#	Constituency	Electoral districts										
#	Constituency	1	2	3	4	5	6	7	8	9	10	11
1	Kranj	Miroslav Cimerman	Vasja Vidic		Miroslav Cimerman (2)	Polonca Dragaš Eržen	Borut Vidmar	Marjana Mastnak		Mito Tušar		Sebastjan Poljanec
2	Postojna	Peter Draksler	Mojca Arzenšek	Valentina Flander	Boris Goljuf		Mojca Arzenšek (2)	Tomaž Jožef Jančigaj	Satyaprem Krevsel	Peter Dakskobler	Satyaprem Krevsel (2)	Tomaž Jožef Jančigaj (2)
3	Ljubljana-Center	Bogdan Urbar	Miro Žitko	Tina Bizjak Šavli	Ester Perozzi	Romana Marolt	Ester Perozzi (2)	Miro Žitko (2)	Gregor Kos	Romana Marolt (2)	Boštjan Vihtelič	Tina Bizjak Šavli (2)
4	Ljubljana-Bežigrad	Nikola Križanić		Biljana Dušić		Miljana Jančigaj	Robert Šest	Eva Kos	Robert Šest (2)	Marko Juršič	Eva Kos (2)	Miljana Jančigaj (2)
5	Celje	Aja Rotovnik	Peter Uratnik		David Bevc		Marija Kočevar	Aja Rotovnik (2)	Marija Kočevar (2)	Danijela Škornik		Jožef Jarh
6	Novo mesto	Jože Ganesh Puri Lužar	Branka Arko	Igor Kuzma	Tomaž Žagar	Ksenija Žagar	Jože Ganesh Puri Lužar (2)	Vesna Di Domenico	Tomaž Žagar (2)	Ksenija Žagar (2)	Branka Arko (2)	Vesna Di Domenico (2)
7	Maribor	Boženka Kos	Maja Pipan	Boženka Kos (2)	Rok Kamnik	Maja Pipan (2)	Rok Kamnik (2)	Valentin Rozman	Izidor Pokrivač	Jyoti Jöbstl		Valentin Rozman (2)
8	Ptuj	Edita Nemec	Jožef Sraka	Jasmina Gayatri Hrastnik	Edita Nemec (2)	Vitomir Ravnikar	Thomas Čuk	Srečko Pavlič	Jožef Sraka (2)	Alenka Vindiš		Jasmina Gayatri Hrastnik (2)

=== Forward Slovenia (NPS) ===
	NPS	Forward Slovenia; Naprej Slovenija										4 candidates
#	Constituency	Electoral districts										
#	Constituency	1	2	3	4	5	6	7	8	9	10	11
1	Kranj	Vesna Praprotnik		Branko Praprotnik		Jože Lukan		Marija Urankar		/	/	/
2	Postojna	/										
3	Ljubljana-Center	/										
4	Ljubljana-Bežigrad	/										
5	Celje	/										
6	Novo mesto	/										
7	Maribor	/										
8	Ptuj	/										

=== Good Country (DD) ===
	DD	Good Country; Dobra država										80 candidates
#	Constituency	Electoral districts										
#	Constituency	1	2	3	4	5	6	7	8	9	10	11
1	Kranj	Tjaša Zupan	Špela Gomboc	Branko Marš	Borut Werber	Karmen Žura		Mateja Čadež	Zvezdana Stojaković		Živko Rus	Andrej Pavletič
2	Postojna	Aleš Kavčič	Adrijana Krajnc Vasović	Igor Crnić	Zlatko Gombar	Lejla Bratić	Leon Graziola	Tina Vidić	Danilo Tkalec	Alenka Rozman	Tjaša Viktorija Volk	Alenka Rozman (2)
3	Ljubljana-Center	Adrijana Zalar	Andrej Mattias	Janez Marinčič	Ingrid Kuk Kikl	Tilen Majnardi	Deja Krajnc	Jaka Vadnjal	Simona Leskovec	Zlatka Kos	Peter Golob	Urška Gagel Boštar
4	Ljubljana-Bežigrad	Danica Rosc Orehek	Gabrijel Leskovec	Mitja Vilar	Peter Perhaj Puntar	Verica Lukić	Natalija Tripković	Zoran Kus	Bojan Dobovšek MP	Smiljan Mekicar	Snežana Tričković	Anton Može
5	Celje	Dušan Škoberne	Metka Modic	Igor Gobec	Helena Zajc	Milena Tepić	Andrej Krajnc	Nataša Koštomaj		Gašper Oswald		Rok Rus
6	Novo mesto	Anton Zvone Kambič	Rok Mežnar	Maja Dragan	Franc Jarc	Božidar Resnik	Damjana Pirc	Božidar Resnik (2)	Sabina Kosmatin	Hedvika Hribšek	Iztok Hribovšek	Goran Domanjko
7	Maribor	Rosvita Svenšek	Peter Šajn	Alenka Orbović	Peter Hronek	Primož Tručl	Silvester Lipošek	Gregor Ficko	Vesna Rožanc	Magdalena Medved	Metka Sparavec	Uroš Lovrenčič
8	Ptuj	Robert Gostinčar	Mirko Luci	Dušan Režonja	Adrijana Gomboc		Mitja Ficko	Jerica Ketiš	Andreja Urbanija	Matija Zorec	Terezija Vidovič	

=== List of Journalist Bojan Požar (LNBP) ===
	LNBP	List of Journalist Bojan Požar; Lista novinarja Bojana Požarja										60 candidates
#	Constituency	Electoral districts										
#	Constituency	1	2	3	4	5	6	7	8	9	10	11
1	Kranj	Rožica Ferjan	Helenca Volf		Aleš Šeligo	Maruša Jazbec Colja		Vili Kovačič	Ivan Kenda	Aleš Šeligo (2)	Ivan Kenda (2)	Gašper Ferjan
2	Postojna	Janž Gornik		Melisa Avdičević	Mark Jaklič		Bilka Baloh	Tino Mamić	Teja Premk	Barbara Drnač		Tino Mamić (2)
3	Ljubljana-Center	France Ocepek	Jani Savinc	Pavel Remec	Robert Kocjančič		Jurij Krajnc	Breda Omerza	Jurij Krajnc (2)	Claudia Sovre		Mojca Furlan
4	Ljubljana-Bežigrad	Andrej Pintar		Samanta Rejc		Gordan Šibić		Tamara Sterle	Ema Kurent	Robert Ivanc	Aleksander Svoljšak	
5	Celje	Janez Hrovat	Borut Arlič		Matjaž Fleisinger		Boris Škerbinek	Breda Kovač	Maja Puklič	Boris Škerbinek (2)	Ljudmila Korez Bizjak	
6	Novo mesto	Melita Goljevšček	Sonja Udvanc		Maja Košak	Marko Kušar		Maja Košak (2)	Primož VIlfan		Matjaž Kosi	
7	Maribor	Helena Pintar	Mojca Baskar	Luka Požar	Borut Podlipnik	Bojan Požar	Petra Repnik	Špela Jazbec	Bojan Požar (2)	Igor Domanjko		Goran Janžekovič
8	Ptuj	Biljana Kramberger	Uroš Kop	Vida Štaman	Jože Korpič	Branko Časar	Jože Gomboši	Goran Gumze	Jasnima Sanković	Uroš Kop (2)	Goran Gumze (2)	Fabia Janžekovič Korez

=== List of Marjan Šarec (LMŠ) ===
	LMŠ	List of Marjan Šarec; Lista Marjana Šarca										78 candidates
#	Constituency	Electoral districts										
#	Constituency	1	2	3	4	5	6	7	8	9	10	11
1	Kranj	Irena Pirc	Alen Kofol	Karla Urh	Robert Nograšek	Boštjan Poklukar	Igor Peček	Edvard Paulič	Uršula Majcen	Davorin Stanonik	Marjan Šarec	Natalija Kovač Jereb
2	Postojna	Justina Erčulj	Alenka Jevšnik	Ivan Marc	Dušan Lužar	Vojmir Urlep	Iztok Štucin	Boštjan Zrimšek	Robert Pavšič	Nataša Nardin	Nataša Majcen	Nataša Nardin (2)
3	Ljubljana-Center	Jerca Korče		Domen Petelin	Urban Bergant	Matej Špehar		Mateja Kirn	Andreja Zabret	Zdravko Selič	Svetla Božičnik	Andreja Zabret (2)
4	Ljubljana-Bežigrad	Julijan Rupnik	Franc Vesel	Matija Podržaj	Dušan Hauptman	Nataša Hozjan Breznjik	Edis Rujović	Žan Potočnik	Alja Perhoč	Katja Damij	Tina Heferle	Brane Golubović
5	Celje	Urška Kabaj Pleterski	Anita Lukenda	Katarina Karlovšek	Igor Žavbi	Nik Prebil	Darij Krajčič	Gregor Rus	Mateja Kumer	Jože Lenart	Adam Vengušt	Barbara Turičnik Hudernik
6	Novo mesto	Vesna Fabjan	Tomaž Troha	Miroslav Rožman	Nika Vrhovnik		Miha Skvarč	Rok Petančič	Tomaž Troha (2)	Nina Maurovič	Nataša Dolenc	Rudi Medved
7	Maribor	Boris Pokorn	Matjaž Kebert	Anamaria Hren	Rudi Spruk	Nataša Trček	Rudi Spruk (2)	Dejan Stanko	Luka Špoljar	Karina Šenveter	Bojan Gregorič	Lidija Divjak Mirnik
8	Ptuj	Mihaela Baumgartner	Aljaž Kovačič	Andrej Rus		Jure Lang	Urška Mauko Tuš	Nataša Vidnar		Nina Žitek	Lovro Lapanja	

=== Modern Centre Party (SMC) ===
	SMC	Modern Centre Party; Stranka modernega centra										87 candidates
#	Constituency	Electoral districts										
#	Constituency	1	2	3	4	5	6	7	8	9	10	11
1	Kranj	Maruša Škopac MP	Bojan Križ	Marija Kozomara	Štefan Skalar	Mateja Udovč	Alenka Bradač	Andreja Potočnik MP	Janez Demšar		Aljaž Žumer	Marko Velikanje
2	Postojna	Sandi Jesenko	Andrej Korenika	Gregor Perič	Mateja Šukalo	Bojan Tavčar	Nastja Brelih	Karl Sakelšek	Erika Dekleva MP	Robert Gajser	Vasja Medvešček	Tjaša Krička
3	Ljubljana-Center	Milan Jurkovič	Valerija Mojca Frank	Jure Leben	Monika Gregorčič	Miro Cerar	Petra Ložar	Saša Tabaković MP	Mitja Horvat MP	Jani Möderndorfer MP	Simon Zajc MP	Alenka Žavbi Kunaver
4	Ljubljana-Bežigrad	Božidar Peteh	Mircho Huky Mavrin	Peter Gašperšič	Dušanka Klančar	Anja Jankovič	Dragan Matić MP	Lucija Šenkinc	Dušan Verbič MP	Milan Brglez MP	Tadeja Savnik	Kamal Izidor Shaker MP
5	Celje	Anita Koleša MP	Matevž Jug	Janja Sluga	Nejc Šporin	Mihaela Anclin	Mojca Rep	Breda Kolar	Bojan Kugonič	Ivan Škodnik MP	Danilo Anton Ranc MP	Ferdo Abraham
6	Novo mesto	Iztok Štefanič	Mojca Špec Potočar	Urška Ban MP	Vida Šušteršič	Igor Zorčič MP	Nicole Radermacher	Franc Pavlin	Marija Minka Zupanc	Vojka Šergan MP	Jože Ovnik	Marjan Dolinšek MP
7	Maribor	Zdravko Počivalšek	Zoran Košič	Špela Sovič	Sanja Miljuš Herman	Helena Kujundžić Lukaček	Ksenija Korenjak Kramar MP	Drago Peklar	Gregor Židan	Jasna Murgel MP	Branislav Rajić MP	Damir Orehovec
8	Ptuj	Darko Horvat	Mojca Žnidarič	Aleksander Kavčič MP	Milan Osterc	Dušan Radič MP	Vera Granfol	Tilen Štefanec	Jasna Drozg	Marta Tuš	Dejan Bračko	Jernej Golc

=== New Slovenia - Christian Democrats (NSi) ===
	NSi	New Slovenia - Christian Democrats; Nova Slovenija - Krščanski demokrati										85 candidates
#	Constituency	Electoral districts										
#	Constituency	1	2	3	4	5	6	7	8	9	10	11
1	Kranj	Jurij Dolžan	Brigita Šolar	Marija Rogar	Vlasta Sagadin	Irena Dolenc	Jože Ipavec	Marta Frantar	Alojz Bogataj	Mihael Prevc	Matej Tonin MP	Barbara Medic
2	Postojna	Matej Hrast	Zdenka Zupančič	Marijana Fatovič	Danijel Sertič		Špela Pogačnik	Andrej Černigoj	Aljaž Plevnik	Ivan Humar	Nadja Ušaj Pregeljc	Jernej Vrtovec MP
3	Ljubljana-Center	Iva Dimic MP	Matej Skvarča	Peter Kolenc	Matej Keber	Mojca Sojar	Urška Pikec Vesel	Julija Humar	Aleš Vogrin	Klemen Jerinc	Aleš Vogrin (2)	Stane Okoliš
4	Ljubljana-Bežigrad	Vincenc Janša	Ljudmila Novak MP	Robert Ilc	Janez Beja	Igor Pigac	Aleksandar Dončev	Maja Šturbej	Jože Jurkovič	Marjeta Bec	Ljudmila Novak MP (2)	Tadeja Šuštar
5	Celje	Nina Drame	Primož Slakan	Miha Lokovšek	Borut Vaš	Aleksander Reberšek	Valentin Hajdinjak	Veronika Juvan	Drago Koren	Zvonka Marhat	Mojca Erjavec	Andrej Otto
6	Novo mesto	Erika Cerar	Vida Čadonič Špelič	Marko Dvornik	Blaž Pavlin	Milena Tomše	Božidar Humar	Robert Kaše	Jože Senica	Anton Iskra	Brane Jordan	Jelena Jerin
7	Maribor	Martin Mikolič	Borut Košič	Jure Levart	Miha Žižek	Andrej Šauperl	Simona Škof	Bernard Memon	Alenka Šverc	Tadeja Račel	Nataša Bauman	Zdravko Luketič
8	Ptuj	Jožef Horvat MP	Simon Kolmanič	Mira Rebernik Žižek	Nataša Kuhar Čerpnjak	Drago Rajbar	Alenka Roškar	David Klobasa	Viktor Vajngerl	Petra Žiher Sok	Klemen Rutar	Dušan Pernek

=== Party of Alenka Bratušek (SAB) ===
	SAB	Party of Alenka Bratušek; Stranka Alenke Bratušek										75 candidates
#	Constituency	Electoral districts										
#	Constituency	1	2	3	4	5	6	7	8	9	10	11
1	Kranj	Andrija Brčinović	Franc Kramar	Franc Horvat	Alenka Bratušek MP		Olga Štancar Pirec	Jurij Korošec	Sandi Markišić	Maja Atanasova	Alenka Pavlič	Maja Atanasova (2)
2	Postojna	Tanja Tarman	Tatjana Voj	Ana Volčič	Jerko Čehovin	Veljko Blažič	Marko Bandelli	Emil Karajić	Edvard Oražem	Aleš Bucik	Andrej Šušmelj	Sonja Pilat
3	Ljubljana-Center	Angela Prlja		Bruno Šterpin	Milojka Vida Intihar	Peter Česnik	Milka Petrovič	Maša Kociper	Iztok Purič	Maša Kociper (2)	Mateja Logar	Amir Čaušević
4	Ljubljana-Bežigrad	Dušica Tarman		Branko Pavlič	Dušan Hvala	Dragana Marjanović	Nina Petrić	Vojko Starović	Jernej Pavlič		Majda Debelec	
5	Celje	Silvester Smolej	Aleksandra Noč		Jože Ribič	Tanja Basle	Tadej Kramar	Patricija Pantelič		Miha Praprotnik	Radovana Kostadinović	
6	Novo mesto	Mira Bakić	Alja Ropret	Saša Jerele	Alja Ropret (2)	Slavko Bizjak	David Imperl	Janko Rezec	Mira Bakić (2)	Miladin Dević	Miro Drobne	Florjana Von Pilpach
7	Maribor	Anton Drofenik	Mitja Horvat		Metka Vodušek	Nastja Praprotnik	Nataša Reich	Hotimir Galič	Slavko Šterman	Aleksandar Tucović	Andrej Rajh	Mirjam Prlja
8	Ptuj	Ljubiša Kostadinović	Milan Feguš		Olga Belec		Ljubica Zrnić	Nadja Požek	Nina Feguš	Darko Jazbec	Maks Ferk	Vlado Koritnik

=== Party of Slovene People (SSN) ===
	SSN	Party of Slovene People; Stranka slovenskega naroda										44 candidates
#	Constituency	Electoral districts										
#	Constituency	1	2	3	4	5	6	7	8	9	10	11
1	Kranj	Ferhan Korać	Marjeta Hribar	Lidija Kolenc	Marko Jeršin	Helena Jeršin	Marko Jeršin (2)	Helena Jeršin (2)	Marjeta Hribar (2)	Franci Magajne	Ferhan Korać (2)	Franci Magajne (2)
2	Postojna	Miha Zajc	Zlatka Olah	/	Zlatka Olah (2)	Tanja Marinšek		Miha Zajc (2)	Janko Hausmeister	Sonja Blaško Doljak		/
3	Ljubljana-Center	Mirko Jager	Janez Kovačič		Marjan Žandar	Ana Brvar	Marjan Žandar (2)	Ana Brvar (2)	Mirko Jager (2)	Marjetka Voden		Karolina Dukarič Turšič
4	Ljubljana-Bežigrad	Biserka Majc		Marjeta Prosič	Majda Miklič	Dragutin Ivanović	Tomislav Lastrić		Dragutin Ivanović (2)	Bojan Žolnir	Majda Miklič (2)	Bojan Žolnir (2)
5	Celje	/										
6	Novo mesto	Tatjana Jagodic	Janica Millonig		Tone Kek		Darko Bukovec		Jožef Špes		Antonija Krajnc	
7	Maribor	Anton Urbanja	Marjeta Kodrič	Alojz Kojzek	Marjeta Kodrič (2)	Alojz Kojzek (2)	Franc Jesenek		Anton Urbanja (2)	Lea Petenej	Stojanka Auguštin	Lea Petenej (2)
8	Ptuj	Alojzija Zemljič	Aleksander Zamuda	Dragica Bačani	Rok Letonja		Dragica Bačani (2)	Natalija Mlakar		Aleksander Zamuda (2)	Miroslava Letonja	

=== Pirate Party of Slovenia (Pirati) ===
	Pirati	Pirate Party of Slovenia; Piratska stranka Slovenije										48 candidates
#	Constituency	Electoral districts										
#	Constituency	1	2	3	4	5	6	7	8	9	10	11
1	Kranj	Ana Debeljak	Jure Trbič		Luka Arvaj	Domen Bogataj	Luka Arvaj (2)	Mateja Konc	Emilija Trbič		Mateja Konc (2)	Domen Bogataj (2)
2	Postojna	Mirjam Golja		Mojca Golob	Aleš Matija Cerar	Maja Čeček	Aleš Matija Cerar (2)	Anže Jesenšek		Boštjan Tavčar		Mojca Golob (2)
3	Ljubljana-Center	Veronika Jesenšek		Maja Zafran	Tomas Tišler		Neža Vižintin		Tomislav Mlinarić	Tomaž Golob	Ratko Stojilković	
4	Ljubljana-Bežigrad	Suzana Juršič	Tina Debeljak Trbič		Suzana Juršič (2)	Gašper Deržanič	Adrien Osenjak		Urša Orehek	Rok Andrée	Urša Orehek (2)	Gašper Deržanič (2)
5	Celje	Gorazd Knific	Miha Ceglar		Aleksandra Bersan	Marija Trbič	Nikolina Borenović	Nejc Gašper	Aleksandra Bersan (2)	Nejc Gašper (2)	Nikolina Borenović (2)	Gorazd Knific (2)
6	Novo mesto	Jani Samsa		Sabina Gregorin	Jože Pirh		Polona Zaletel	Rok Deželak		Sabina Gregorin (2)	Polona Zaletel (2)	Janja Cankar
7	Maribor	Metka Cvetko		Aleksandra Valjavec	Peter Močnik	Patrik Kristl		Aleksandra Valjavec (2)	Peter Močnik (2)	Tomislav Kiš		Mojca Trbič
8	Ptuj	Marjana Škalič	Barbara Repič	Marjana Škalič (2)	Igor Brlek		Nika Rebec	Žiga Urbanija	Nika Rebec (2)	Robert Križanič		Žiga Urbanija (2)

=== Save Slovenia from Elite and Tycoons ===
	ReSET	Save Slovenia from Elite and Tycoons; Rešimo Slovenijo elite in tajkunov										25 candidates
#	Constituency	Electoral districts										
#	Constituency	1	2	3	4	5	6	7	8	9	10	11
1	Kranj	/										
2	Postojna	/										
3	Ljubljana-Center	/										
4	Ljubljana-Bežigrad	/										
5	Celje	Katja Kresnik	Jasna Letica		Grega Končnik		Katja Kresnik (2)			Sergej Trnjek Hiter	Matevž Gerdej	Martin Ivec
6	Novo mesto	/										
7	Maribor	Mojca Čižek Sajko	Lovrenc Haložan	Polonca Šebart	Sara Kramberger	Andreja Makoter	Denis Štandeker	David Dominko	Ivo Kopecky	Vlasta Dominko	Kai Ekart	Matija Sajko
8	Ptuj	Dušan Trajbarič	Maja Halec		Mario Fekonja	Tomaž Lopert	Mario Fekonja (2)	Ivan Vek	Nataša Rodeš		Anja Rodeš	

=== Slovene Democratic Party (SDS) ===
	SDS	Slovene Democratic Party; Slovenska demokratska stranka										88 candidates
#	Constituency	Electoral districts										
#	Constituency	1	2	3	4	5	6	7	8	9	10	11
1	Kranj	Irena Pfeifer	Tamara Bertoncelj	Mark Toplak	Nataša Jenkole	Bojan Homan	Branko Grims MP	Jure Ferjan	Marko Pogačnik MP	Žan Mahnič MP	Aleš Hojs	Patricija Šulin MEP
2	Postojna	Danijel Krivec MP	Vojko Jevševar	Majda Vrtovec	Djordjo Šmitran	Silvano Radin	Mara Glušič	Adrijana Kocjančič	Zvonko Černač	Elena Zavadlav Ušaj	Magda Kruh	Eva Irgl MP
3	Ljubljana-Center	Andrej Šircelj MP	Daniel Cukjati	Alenka Jeraj	Andrej Aplenc	Zvone Čadež	Anže Logar MP	Alenka Žagar Slana	Tanja Bizjan	Irena Horvat	Mojca Škrinjar	Leon Merjasec
4	Ljubljana-Bežigrad	Luka Bubnjić	Jože Tanko MP	Janez Janša MP	Boris Doblekar	Janez Moškrič	Igor Horvat	Ida Medved	Lucija Šikovec Ušaj	Irena Potočnik	Žiga Štiftar	Alenka Gotar
5	Celje	Jelka Godec MP	Karmen Kozmus	Vinko Gorenak MP	Ljubo Žnidar MP	Marjan Golavšek	Nada Brinovšek MP	Suzana Kavaš	Franc Rosec	Andrej Breznik	Aleš Logar	Andraž Koželnik
6	Novo mesto	Maja Kocjan	Anja Bah Žibert MP	Marjanca Trščinar Antić	Franci Kepa	Katja Čanžar	Martina Prevejšek	Tomaž Lisec MP	Jelena Konda	Andrej Funkl	Alenka Forte	Roman Perklič
7	Maribor	Viktor Božak	Karmen Furman	Bojan Podkrajšek MP	Vlasta Krmelj	Ksenija Šeligo	Rok Klajnšek	Dejan Kaloh	Ivan Celcer	Zvonko Zinrajh	Jonata Potočnik	Lidija Kocuvan Gašparič
8	Ptuj	Janez Magyar	Danijel Vrbnjak	Lenart Barat	Bojan Petrijan	Jožica Jakob	Alja Domjan	Franc Breznik MP	Marijan Pojbič MP	Jožef Lenart	Nuša Ferenčič	Suzana Lep Šimenko MP

=== Slovene National Party (SNS) ===
	SNS	Slovene National Party; Slovenska nacionalna stranka										76 candidates
#	Constituency	Electoral districts										
#	Constituency	1	2	3	4	5	6	7	8	9	10	11
1	Kranj	Dijana Branilović	Maja Hausman	Zoran Stevanović	Jožica Dežman Kovačič		Andrej Žerovc	Rok Stojanović	Nika Jurca	Rado Jurca	Valter Hafner	Nika Jurca (2)
2	Postojna	Emanuel Krečič	Jos Zalokar	Petra Mežnarc	Monika Zupanc Jelinčič		Srečko Prijatelj	Romano Brozina	Daška Buletinac	Mateja Jerkič		Emanuel Krečič (2)
3	Ljubljana-Center	Franc Mišič	Janja Mišič	Boštjan Vranješ	Jože Kovač	Aleksandra Kadunc		Iztok Fortuna	Marjanca Golobič Božič		Sonja Bagari	
4	Ljubljana-Bežigrad	Alenka Jelenovič	Iza Pia Božič	Erika Brumen	Matjaž Peskar	Mirjam Čelec	Sonny Beronja	Mirjam Čelec (2)	Nevenka Lučić Stanimirović	Klavdi Štenkler	Bojan Kličić	
5	Celje	Lidija Ivanuša	Radomir Kopranovič	Boštjan Grzinčič	Suzana Rednak	Danijel Vombek	Tina Quéchon	Joviša Kraljević	Jelena Miljković	Gregor Vrtič	Bojan Pandev	Gregor Vrtič (2)
6	Novo mesto	Sergej Čas	Matjaž Engel	Ingrid Hodnik		Darinka Arh	Dušan Šiško	Janja Košar	Boris Klepej	Ivana Bendra	Bojan Kovačič	Boris Gorenc
7	Maribor	Jožef Zorin	Božidar Vivod	Zmago Jelinčič Plemeniti		Katarina Žunko	Marko Pavlinek	Lidija Dajčman	Alenka Mrhar	Andrej Vidovič	Primož Kosi	Andreja Gselman
8	Ptuj	Sandra Nemec	Jani Ivanuša	Primož Krajnc	Staša Kocjančič	Natalija Veldin	Matej Dvoršak	Goran Erjavec	Erih Erjavec	Dejan Horvat	Blanka Korošec	Folko Puconja

=== Slovene People's Party (SLS) ===
	SLS	Slovene People's Party; Slovenska ljudska stranka										84 candidates
#	Constituency	Electoral districts										
#	Constituency	1	2	3	4	5	6	7	8	9	10	11
1	Kranj	Matilda Klinar	Rok Peterman	Milan Pohar	Nevenka Dolenc	Janez Porenta	Franc Rozman	Helena Polajnar	Darja Jamnik	Matej Šubic	Maja Hribovšek	Klemen Šavli
2	Postojna	Marko Miklavič	Anton Škof	Bojan Zadel	Nea Lulik		Andreja Krt Stopar	Branko Mahne	Majda Godina	Darinka Kozinc	Ema Kladnik	David Bratož
3	Ljubljana-Center	Zvonko Govednik	Zdenka Petoš	Uroš Čuden	Polona Glavan	Alexander Crowther	Primož Rihtar	Andrej Umek	Polonca Blumauer	Mira Grabeljšek		Štefan Čebašek
4	Ljubljana-Bežigrad	Marko Rovan	Blaž Milavec	Alojzija Fink	Lijana Lovše	Igor Koprivnikar	Leposlava Jovanić	Janez Žagar	Mateja Rahne	Daniel Valentine	Franc Rokavec	Tatjana Čop
5	Celje	Mihaela Rožej	Branka Gal	Darja Turk	Jože Krulec	Janez Lencl	Tomaž Pečovnik	Rafael Goršek	Mihael Letonje	Peter Cesar	Natalija Pečovnik	Aljaž Stražišnik
6	Novo mesto	Tadeja Romih	Franc Hudoklin		Jože Korbar	Marija Levak	Franc Bogovič MEP	Zvone Košmerl	Franc Zdolšek	Marta Kramžar Jelakovič	Petra Karba	Primož Jelševar
7	Maribor	Marko Zidanšek	Modest Motaln	Miran Gorinšek	Nina Ocepek	Nataša Hrup	Aleš Meglič	Roman Žveglič	Janez Jemec	Jožef Perko	Tadeja Tertinek	Bojana Stopinšek
8	Ptuj	Rok Zver	Emil Trtstenjak	Alojz Štuhec Jr.	Jasmina Opec Vöröš	Maja Papič Lindič	Alojz Štuhec Jr.	Izak Matej Ciraj	Miša Pušenjak	Janez Horvat	Miša Pušenjak (2)	Suzana Lara Krause

=== Social Democrats (SD) ===
	SD	Social Democrats; Socialni demokrati										88 candidates
#	Constituency	Electoral districts										
#	Constituency	1	2	3	4	5	6	7	8	9	10	11
1	Kranj	Vitomir Pretnar	Eva Štraus Podlogar	Mojca Faganel	Janez Černe	Alenka Podbevšek	Špela Šifkovič Soklič	Drago Zadnikar	Mirjam Jan Blažić	Jože Prezl	Gregor Goriup	Samo Bevk
2	Postojna	Branko Velišček	Meira Hot	Romina Kralj	Marijan Križman	Natalija Gulč	Ljubica Jelušič	Borut Rojc	Goran Blaško	Vlasta Mozetič	Matjaž Nemec MP	Miloš Bizjak
3	Ljubljana-Center	Damijana Škrlj	Darko Mršič	Jasmina Volarič	Tanja Vrzič	Mirko Pečarič	Dušan Olaj	Anja Kopač Mrak	Jernej Pikalo	Marko Koprivc	Tadej Cmerekar	Irena Kuntarič Hribar
4	Ljubljana-Bežigrad	Predrag Baković	Matej Zobec	Marija Koščak	Aleksander Gombač	Nataša Bombač	Martina Vuk	Andreja Černak Meglič	Franc Križanič	Dušan Semolič	Brigita Skela Savič	Goran Šarac
5	Celje	Vincenc Frece	Jure Frlež	Olga Bezenšek Lalić	Viktor Mitov	Tanja Trobiš	Aleksandra Vasiljević	Andreja Katič	Jan Škoberne MP	Lucija Fink	Jani Prednik	Dominika Švarc Pipan
6	Novo mesto	Jaka Birkelbach	Tanja Strniša	Milena Kramar Zupan	Anton Maver	Bernardka Ogorevc	Silvo Krošelj	Ana Jelančić	Matjaž Han MP	Soniboj Knežak	Sibila Ložina	Tin Kampl
7	Maribor	Andreja Flucher	Ludvik Repolusk	Jernej Štromajer	Bojana Muršič MP	Alenka Iskra	Boris Potrč	Žiga Štajnbaher	Mateja Dover Emeršič	Renata Prislan	Matej Žmavc	Bojan Horvat
8	Ptuj	Ivan Koncut	Ivan Zadravec	Bojan Lešer	Jolanda Lozar	Dejan Židan	Norma Bole	Gorazd Voglar	Milena Babič	Karmen Kolarič	Nuška Gajšek	Dejan Levanič

=== Socialist Party of Slovenia (SPS) ===
	SPS	Socialist Party of Slovenia; Socialistična partija Slovenije										44 candidates
#	Constituency	Electoral districts										
#	Constituency	1	2	3	4	5	6	7	8	9	10	11
1	Kranj	Igor Nemec	Darja Sekelez		Igor Nemec (2)	Firket Hrnčić		Ferida Džamastagić	Tina Skelez		Ivan Nemec	
2	Postojna	Walter Dragosavljević Rutar	Božena Kumar	Vahdeta Dragosavljevič Rutar	Marko Kumar	Silvo Leban		Vahdeta Dragosavljevič Rutar (2)	Božena Kumar (2)	Martina Leban	Ljubo Koman	Marko Kumar (2)
3	Ljubljana-Center	Nina Sonia Kovačič	Ivan Rogan	Nina Sonia Kovačič (2)	Nada Kožuh	Martin Golob		Tadej Trček	Breda Potočnik	Tadej Trček	Breda Potočnik (2)	Nada Kožuh (2)
4	Ljubljana-Bežigrad	Gabrijela Trček	Irena Marinko	Branka Gombač	Irena Marinko	Matjaž Bidovec		Bojan Brgant	Gabrijela Trček (2)	Bojan Brgant (2)	Slavko Puljić	
5	Celje	Rajko Gajić	Darko Oblak		Jožef Romih		Jože Videmšek	Niky Golob	Petra Trček	Niky Golob (2)	Gabrijela Trček	Jože Videmšek (2)
6	Novo mesto	Žiga Novak	Peter Gentile	Mitja Softić	Mara Rogan	Peter Gentile (2)	Žiga Novak (2)	Vanja Bajt	Mitja Softić (2)	Darko Šrenk		Šemsa Alibašić
7	Maribor	/										
8	Ptuj	Marijana Maselj	Darja Čagran Stemelak	Janja Grdiša	Aleš Puh	Dušan Grdiša	Darja Čagran Stemelak (2)	Janja Grdiša (2)	Rok Nagode	Aleš Puh (2)	Dušan Grdiša (2)	Rok Nagode (2)

=== Solidarity - For a Fair Society! (Solidarnost) ===
	Solidarnost	Solidarity - For a Fair Society! Solidarnost - za pravično družbo!										54 candidates
#	Constituency	Electoral districts										
#	Constituency	1	2	3	4	5	6	7	8	9	10	11
1	Kranj	Danica Uran Ušej	Andrej Kokot		Anton Janeš	Andreja Vehar		Polona Moravec Lubej	Andrej Steklasa		Mitja Bokalič	Roman Rupnik
2	Postojna	Mitja Klavora	Brigita Zupančič	Boris Furlan Gustinčič	Mitja Klavora (2)	Boris Furlan Gustinčič (2)	Ines Kos	Zvonka Cesnik		Dominik Soban		Ines Kos (2)
3	Ljubljana-Center	Špela Božič	Irena Kranjc	Srečko Knaflc	Irena Kranjc (2)	Andrej Stanič		Miha Pitako	Damjan Mandelc		Magda Ida Šmon	Andrej Pengov Bitenc
4	Ljubljana-Bežigrad	Darko Hribar	Mateja Mlakar	Andrej Podobnik		Andrej Jordan		Tjaša Učakar		Gorazd Marinček	Tanja Logar	
5	Celje	Bojan Butolen	Janez Goršič		Branislav Vujičić	Irena Filipič	Branislav Vujičić (2)	Brigita Kaker		Bojan Butolen (2)	Tamara Marinček	
6	Novo mesto	Marjanca Kočevar Colarič	Uroš Lubej		Marija Marinček		Marjanca Kočevar Colarič (2)	Anela Vukalić		Nada Drnovšek	Marjan Frigelj	Zoran Artnak
7	Maribor	Robert Vasa		Lidija Papež	Janko Pečnik	Bojan Pernek		Zdenka Švigelj	Karina Ditz	Janko Pečnik (2)	Zdenka Švigelj (2)	Karina Ditz (2)
8	Ptuj	Marko Vuk	Klavdija Žabot		Anton Tomo Tadel		Roman Lukman		Jolanda Zagorac		Marko Vuk (2)	Marija Moravec

=== Together Forward (SN) ===
	SN	Together Forward; Skupaj naprej										66 candidates
#	Constituency	Electoral districts										
#	Constituency	1	2	3	4	5	6	7	8	9	10	11
1	Kranj	Damir Delić	Špela Udir	Tatjana Žerovnik	Vesna Koselj	Janja Martinović	Peter Petrovčič		Dragica Šturm	Božena Starman	Bojan Kotnik	Uroš Žajdela
2	Postojna	Vojka Milenc	Sanja Kuček Bergant	Danijel Bešič Loredan	Janko Strel	Ksenija Franca	Vasja Ivančič	Tanja Jaksetič Bradelj		Samanta Polajžer	Danijel Bešič Loredan (2)	Samanta Polajžer (2)
3	Ljubljana-Center	Nina Martinović	Dražen Dragić	Andrej Premk	Tina Job	Siniša Trivunović	Anđelina Krstić	Bendeta Lampič	Marko Teodorović	Bendeta Lampič (2)	Dejan Mesarič	Valentina Pejović
4	Ljubljana-Bežigrad	Klavdija Makuc	Tina Tanko	Tomaž Sojer	Igor Žerovnik	Uroš Makarić	Janko Trivunović	Marjeta Kuhar	Marjan Koršič	Sašo Sušnik	Edita Tomić	Klavdija Makuc (2)
5	Celje	Monika Jelen	Franc Mesojednik	Monika Jelen (2)	Igor Centrih		Renata Natek Hudarin	Leonida Ladinek	Boris Furjan	Renata Natek Hudarin (2)	Rene Dopler	Leonida Ladinek
6	Novo mesto	Marjetka Mayr	Edita Dobaj	Marjetka Mayr (2)	Edita Dobaj (2)	Rado Škof	Sandi Majcen	Ana Klun		Viktor Žajdela		Monja Polajžer
7	Maribor	Laura Berglez		Ljubo Dobaj	Jernej Možič	Ljubo Dobaj (2)	Dejan Peršuh	Maja Poš	Anita Premužič	Maja Poš (2)	Metka Uršič	Anita Premužič (2)
8	Ptuj	Marjana Blažke		Sarah Bauman		Saška Omergač	Dušan Mesarič	Saška Omergač (2)	Zvonko Peršuh	Dušan Mesarič (2)	Gorazd Ladinek	

=== The left (Levica) ===
	Levica	The Left; Levica										83 candidates
#	Constituency	Electoral districts										
#	Constituency	1	2	3	4	5	6	7	8	9	10	11
1	Kranj	Boris Grilc	Alma Rekić	Klemen Erman	Miha Kordiš MP	Simon Maljavec	Neja Bobič	Alma Rekić (2)	Miha Kordiš MP (2)	Blaž Vrhunc	Lučka Vavpetič	Ema Otavnik
2	Postojna	Gordana Erdelič	Pavle Plahutnik	Alan Medveš	Matej Tašner Vatovec MP	Maja Tašner Vatovec	Bojan Pahor	Denis Kresevič	Tina Žigon	Marko Rusjan	Jaka Fabjan	Lara Janković
3	Ljubljana-Center	Miha Belca	Dragan Miranović	Mitja Svete	Luka Omladič	Milan Jakopovič	Tomaž Žavbi	Violeta Tomić MP	Asta Vrečko	Dan Juvan	Bojana Žukov Gregorič	Alenka Pirjevec
4	Ljubljana-Bežigrad	Franc Korotaj	Jožica Majer	Janez Janša	Kaja Mlakar-Agrež	Boštjan Zrnec	Luka Mesec MP	Nataša Sukič		Luka Mesec MP (2)	Iva Padar	Grega Ciglar
5	Celje	Anže Razboršek	Mateja Žvižej	Željko Cigler	Sebastjan Ašenberger		Helena Žagar	Tjaša Podpečan	Goran Lukić	Doroteja Pospihalj	Milan Mrđenović	Branko Ivanič
6	Novo mesto	Majda Povše	Irena Levičar	Ana Štromajer	Klemen Tršinar	Peter Dirnbek	Aleš Suša	Sašo Jejčič	Tina Kolar	Rebeka Kupec	Primož Siter	Aleš Gulič
7	Maribor	Alen Križnik	Jure Justinek	Jerica Strgar	Drago Bolčina	Borut Osonkar	Urška Lipovž	Bojan Javornik	Franc Trček MP	Simona Mauko	Matej Obu	Tatjana Frangež
8	Ptuj	Milan Utroša	Biserka Utroša	Gregor Zorman	Marko Sraka	Stojan Habjanič	Valentina Škafar	Branko Harl	Dejan Unger	Lara Štrokaj	Boštjan Koražija	Marjana Vidmar

=== United left and Unity (ZL-S) ===
	ZL-S	United Left and Unity; Združena levica in Sloga										78 candidates
#	Constituency	Electoral districts										
#	Constituency	1	2	3	4	5	6	7	8	9	10	11
1	Kranj	Gordana Ana Višnar Župančič	Jožef Urbanc	Margareta Zakonjšek Rupnik	Iztok Škofic	Branislav Žerjal	Marija Sitar Fridl	Branislav Žerjal (2)	Janez Hafner	Špela Vidervol	Nevenka Uhan	Pia De Paulis Debevc
2	Postojna	Angel Vidmar	Zvonko Hočevar	Majda Prijon	Jadranka Vesel	Teodor Colnar	Črtomir Tavš	Milena Bužan	Arn Brozič	Eda Kodrič	Dušan Bremec	Vilko Brus
3	Ljubljana-Center	Matej Černigoj	Ciril Brajer	Tina Nemanič	Diana Rihar	Miroslav Huskić	Jernej Novak	Nina Grabnar	Janja Štorgelj	Polonca Andrejčič Mušič	Jurij Benko	Lev Lah
4	Ljubljana-Bežigrad	Janko Veber MP	Aleš Hoge	Dušan Divjak	Aljoša Ivanović	Janko Belin	Branko Damjanovič	Tatjana Strah	Matjaž Anžur	Maja Vidaković	Vera Kozmik Vodušek	Kristina Šercer
5	Celje	/										
6	Novo mesto	Vinko Žalec	Ivica Kastelic	Valerija Balkovec	Franc Brane Praznik	Ivica Medvešek	Ruth Bučar	Sergej Horvat	Andreja Drvarič	Franc Bokal	Gregor Kaplan	Franc Bokal (2)
7	Maribor	Dragica Missia	Veronika Županek	Nataša Pavčič Rodošek	Milan Kušnik	Veronika Županek (2)	Rastko Plohl	Miran Cvetko	Aleksander Županek	Erik Kos	Laura Petek	Bojan Kotnik
8	Ptuj	Mirko Hrenk	Mitja Šprah	Jasna Vidaković	Darko Kuzmič	Tina Ficko	Marjan Kulčar	Anton Mlasko	Tanja Gorišek	Nadja Ritlop	Živa Ladič	Jure Jurjovič

=== United Right (ZD) ===
	ZD	United Right; Združena desnica										53 candidates
#	Constituency	Electoral districts										
#	Constituency	1	2	3	4	5	6	7	8	9	10	11
1	Kranj	/										
2	Postojna	Peter Zidar		Darinka Jurjevc	Miroslava Ganzitti		Matija Potokar	Majda Žužek		Suzana Šulin		Janez Cerkovnik
3	Ljubljana-Center	Norma Marija Korošec	Simona Medvešček	Apolonija Naglič	Borut Vrščaj	Smiljan Purger	Špela Rotar	Ingo Falk Pasch Wallersberg		Borut Vrščaj (2)	Apolonija Naglič (2)	Anton Kokalj
4	Ljubljana-Bežigrad	Urška Florjančič	Andreja Ravnihar Megušar	Mihael Jarc	Luka Zevnik	Mihael Jarc (2)	Urška Florjančič (2)	Zdenko Tršinar		Luka Zevnik (2)	Marta Ciraj	
5	Celje	Marija Gračnar	Sonja Ramšak	Marija Gračnar (2)	Franc Rančigaj		Bogomir Zamernik	Ismet Džambić		Barbara Taurer	Ines Poštrak	
6	Novo mesto	/										
7	Maribor	Katarina Kunej	Majda Ganzitti	Milan Stebernak	Saša Perkljič	Danijela Šerbinek	Željko Vogrin	Franc Kangler	Boris Popovič		Bojan Permozer	Boris Kostanjevec
8	Ptuj	Željka Vojta Babič	Miran Hergula	Jožef Jandl	Biserka Smolek	Anton Štihec	Željka Vojta Babič (2)	Franci Donko	Vesna Mujaković	Franc Pukšič		Zdenka Holc

=== United Slovenia (ZSi) ===
	ZSi	United Slovenia; Zedinjena Slovenija										66 candidates
#	Constituency	Electoral districts										
#	Constituency	1	2	3	4	5	6	7	8	9	10	11
1	Kranj	Salbi Tomasin	Lilijana Debak	Mateja Žlogar	Zdravko Korošec	Ivan Kastigar	Nina Blaž	Nataša Intihar Pazlar	Peter Bernik	Mirko Gašparić	Miroslav Snedec	Mateja Žlogar
2	Postojna	Srečko Šorli	Desire Joras		Kristina Povalec		Marjan Poljšak	Duška Krnel Umek		Uroš Brezavšček		Marjan Poljšak (2)
3	Ljubljana-Center	Tomaž Jeraj	Gašper Petrač	Nika Bidar	Alja Kostanjšek	Nika Bidar (2)	Jaka Bitenc	Petra Gradišar		Jaka Bitenc (2)	Gašper Petrač (2)	Tomaž Jeraj (2)
4	Ljubljana-Bežigrad	Suzana Smolej		Tatjana Demec	Rudi Pintar		Nika Krizmanič	Matija Blatnik		Nika Krizmanič (2)	Robert Lipušček	
5	Celje	Roman Zalokar	Danijel Navodnik	Robert Rozman	Reneja Robič	Nataša Gorjanc Zima	Damjan Jerenko	Mojca Macuh	Blaženka Bartolič	Bojan Zabukovnik		Joško Joras
6	Novo mesto	Matjaž Strojin	Janja Turk	Peter Arnšek	Jerneja Kic	Mafred Grmovšek	Franc Šalamon	Brankica Hudina Sladič	Marjan Rupnik		Janja Turk	Brankica Hudina Sladič (2)
7	Maribor	Barbara Pezdevšek	Urban Šiško		Domen Igličar	Davorin Medved	Anica Bidar	Primož Durjava	Domen Igličar (2)	Davorin Medved (2)	Barbara Petek	Andrej Šiško
8	Ptuj	Marija Volgyi	Andreja Kovačec Vizjak	Dejan Kardinar	Alenka Prah	Vojko Prah	Franc Friškič	Nuša Praper	Gregor Habjanič	Ivan Bolfek		Rajko Osojnik

== Representatives of national minorities ==
=== Italian national minority ===
Constituency No. 9
1	Maurizio Tremul
2	Žiža Felice
3	Bruno Orlando

=== Hungarian national minority ===
Constituency No. 10
1	Ferenc Horváth
2	Gabriela Sobočan

== List of current MPs that are not running ==
- Marija Bačič (SD)
- Dejan Balažič (SMC)
- Roberto Battelli (Italian minority) - longest serving MP in history of Slovenia
- Mirjam Bon Klanjšček (SAB)
- Marko Ferluga (SMC)
- Tomaž Gantar (DeSUS)
- László Göncz (Hungarian minority)
- Irena Grošelj Košnik (SMC)
- Matjaž Hanžek (Independent)
- Irena Kotnik (SMC)
- Marjana Kotnik Poropat (DeSUS)
- Marija Antonija Kovačič (DeSUS)
- Bojan Krajnc (Independent)
- Simona Kustec Lipicer (SMC) - leader of SMC in the National Assembly
- Franc Laj (Independent)
- Marinka Levičar (DeSUS)
- Teja Ljubič (SMC)
- Vlasta Počkaj (SMC)
- Ivan Prelog (SMC)
- Vesna Vervega (SMC)
- Branko Zorman (SMC)
