= Director General of Police (Slovenia) =

- Incumbent; Damjan Petrič since 10 October 2025
- First holder: Borut Likar
- Website: https://www.policija.si

The Director General of Police (Slovene: Generalni direktor policije) is the highest ranking police official in Slovenia.

== List ==
Name	Term
Borut Likar	1 August 1998–4 February 1999
Andrej Podvršič	1 March 1999–15 June 2000
Marko Pogorevc	16 June 2000–14 January 2003
Darko Anželj	15 January 2003–7 April 2005
Bojan Potočnik	7 April 2005–1 July 2005 (acting)
Jože Romšek	1 July 2005–8 January 2009
Matjaž Šinkovec	8 January 2009–19 February 2009 (acting)
Janko Goršek	19 February 2009–30 September 2012 (acting)
Stanislav Veniger	18 October 2012–29 October 2014
Marjan Fank	2 November 2014–5 January 2018 (acting)
Simon Velički	6 January 2018–11 December 2018
Tatjana Bobnar	12 December 2018–13 March 2020
Anton Travner	14 March 2020–12 June 2020 (acting); 12 June 2020–30 June 2020
Andrej Jurič	1 July 2020–29 January 2021 (acting)
Anton Olaj	29 January 2021–2 June 2022
Boštjan Lindav	2 June 2022– 23 February 2023 (acting)
Senad Jušić	23 February 2023–7 September 2023 (acting); 7 September 2023–15 January 2025
Damjan Petrič	16 January 2025–10 October 2025 (acting); 10 October 2025–present
