= Marta Kos =

Slovenian diplomat and politician (born 1965)

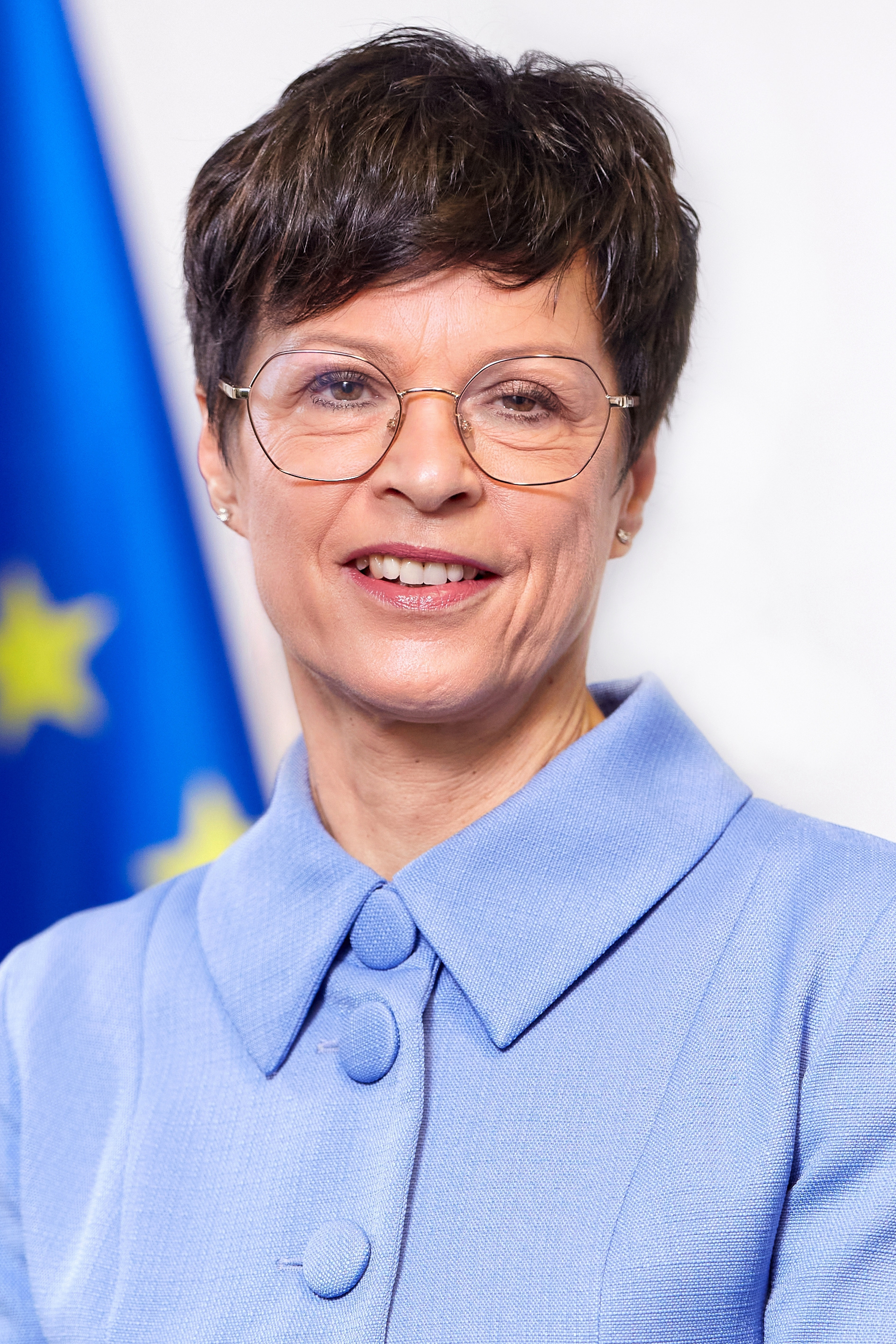
- Official portrait, 2024

European Commissioner for Enlargement
- Incumbent
- Assumed office 1 December 2024
- Commission: Von der Leyen II
- Preceded by: Olivér Várhelyi

Vice President of the Freedom Movement
- In office 21 April 2022 – 13 September 2022
- President: Robert Golob

Ambassador of Slovenia to Switzerland
- In office 12 September 2017 – 30 June 2020
- Preceded by: Franc Mikša
- Succeeded by: Iztok Grmek

Ambassador of Slovenia to Germany
- In office 27 September 2013 – 12 September 2017
- Preceded by: Mitja Drobnič
- Succeeded by: Franc But

Vice President of the Chamber of Commerce and Industry of Slovenia
- In office 2000–2003

Personal details
- Born: Marta Kos; 28 June 1965 (age 61) Slovenj Gradec, SR Slovenia, Yugoslavia
- Party: Independent (2023–present)
- Other political affiliations: SKJ (formerly); GS (2022–2023)
- Spouse(s): Aaron Marko (m. 2002; div. 2018) Henri Gétaz
- Relatives: Drago Kos (brother)
- Education: Faculty of Social Sciences, Ljubljana
- Occupation: Journalist • Diplomat • Politician

Marta Kos (Slovene pronunciation: [ˈmáːrta ˈkóːs]; born 28 June 1965) is a Slovenian diplomat and politician. She served as ambassador to Germany from 2013 to 2017, and as ambassador to Switzerland from 2017 to 2020. Since December 2024, she is the European Commissioner for Enlargement in the second von der Leyen Commission.

From April to September 2022, she was one of the vice presidents of the Freedom Movement. Ahead of the 2022 presidential election, she was the candidate of the Freedom Movement for president of Slovenia until her withdrawal in August. Following the withdrawal she resigned as Freedom Movement vice president. Following the resignation of Tatjana Bobnar as Minister of the Interior she also resigned from the Freedom Movement stating that it is not her party anymore.

== Early life and career ==
In her youth, Kos was a record-holding Yugoslav and Slovenian swimming champion. She studied journalism and joined the sports division of RTV, and later moved to Germany where she worked for Deutsche Welle and as Bonn correspondent for RTV starting in 1993. From 1997 to 1999, she served as director of the Slovenian government information office and as spokesperson of the government. In 2000, she was appointed vice president of the Chamber of Commerce and Industry.

In 2013, the government of Alenka Bratušek appointed her Ambassador to Berlin, Germany, as part of a political quota (non-career diplomats). In 2017, she was appointed Ambassador to Bern, Switzerland. In 2020, she resigned as ambassador due to disagreement with the government's foreign policy, as well as accusations of mobbing and consequential internal control over the work of the embassy.

In 2022, she announced her candidacy for President of the Republic. In unexplained circumstances, she resigned from her candidacy and resigned as vice-president of the Freedom Movement. After the resignation of Tatjana Bobnar as Minister of the Interior, due to a conflict with Prime Minister Robert Golob, she also resigned from the Freedom Movement party in 2023, explaining that it was no longer her party, thus supporting Tatjana Bobnar.

In September 2024, she was proposed as a candidate for a member of European commissioner for Enlargement, responsible for overseeing relations with Eastern neighbors replacing Tomaž Vesel, who resigned from the candidacy for European Commissioner. On 17 September 2024, Ursula von der Leyen announced Kos would be in charge of the European enlargement, pending approval of the European Parliament, thus assessing membership applications of Ukraine and Moldova and other countries to join the European Union. In September 2024, Kos was accused then by the right-wing Slovenian Democratic Party over her alleged involvement with the former Yugoslav Communist secret service, UDBA. In March 2026 Kos faced renewed allegations of having collaborated with the UDBA.

== Personal life ==
Kos is married to Henri Gétaz, who was the secretary general of the European Free Trade Association until 2023.
