= Slovenian National Police Force =

Law enforcement agency

Slovenian National Police Force Policija
- Logo of the Slovenian Police

Agency overview
- Formed: 1991
- Employees: 8 162 (2023)
- Annual budget: €257 million

Jurisdictional structure
- Operations jurisdiction: Slovenia
- Area: 20,273 square kilometres (7,827 mi^{2})
- Population: 2,123,949 (2024)
- General nature: Local civilian police

Operational structure
- Headquarters: Generalna policijska uprava, Štefanova 2, 1501 Ljubljana
- Sworn members: 7,347 (2022)
- Civilians: 1,079 (2022)
- Minister responsible: Branko Zlobko, Ministry of the Interior
- Agency executive: Senad Jušić, Director general of the police

Facilities
- Stations: 111

Website
- www.policija.si/eng/

The Slovenian National Police Force (Slovene: Policija) is the national government agency that handles the responsibility of law enforcement of the Republic of Slovenia. It is composed of the eight police directorates in Celje, Koper, Kranj, Ljubljana, Maribor, Murska Sobota, Nova Gorica, and Novo Mesto. Law enforcement in Slovenia is governed by the Slovenian Ministry of Internal Affairs. The police force maintains a number of international partnerships with foreign police forces, including training with the U.S. Federal Bureau of Investigation, and involvement in Albania and Kosovo with the Multinational Advisory Police Element. The Slovenian police force was admitted to Organization for Security and Co-operation in Europe on March 24, 1992.

== Organization ==
The Slovenian National Police Force operates under the Slovenian Ministry of the Interior at three levels, local, general and regional, and is headquartered in Ljubljana. Slovenia is divided into 8 police directorates which control 111 police stations, all of which come under the jurisdiction of the Director General of the Police. In addition to this regular police force, Slovenia also employs the Specialna Enota Policije, utilised for Counter-Terrorism and other high-risk tasks that are too dangerous or too difficult for regular police units.

== Staffing ==
The Slovenian Police has suffered from chronic underfunding and under-staffing in recent years, due to the public sector's Intervention Measures Act of 2010/11 and the Fiscal Balance Act of 2012. Consequently, a department-wide emergency hiring-freeze was implemented. With combined retirements and unscheduled quittings of many officers due to low salaries, poor benefits and working conditions, the police force lost over 1,000 officers with no replacements being made between the years 2010 and 2015. The hiring freeze was lifted in early January 2015.

Since January 2015, the Slovenian Police had started an increasing recruiting effort with over 300 new officers being hired throughout 2015 along with new applications for 600 reserve, 156 regular and 150 border-patrol police officers being processed as of February 2016.

Due to deteriorating working conditions, the majority of the operational police force went on limited-strike in mid-November 2015. The strike included officers refusing to issue traffic citations for the majority of all offences and decreased response-times on non-emergency calls. After 6 months, the strike officially ended on June 2, 2016, with both of the police unions and the Slovenian Ministry of Internal Affairs reaching an agreement on raising police salaries and certain benefits. Over 5300 officers are now eligible to receive an average raise of €720 (IAT) to their total annual salaries as well as the new post-academy salary going from €8,280 to €9,060 (IAT).

In January 2021, the Ministry of the Interior, led by Aleš Hojs, disclosed salary information with the specification of names and surnames, workposts, and gross salaries received in December 2020 for all the employees of the Slovenian Police. The event was a response to the start of a police strike and was followed by a massive public outcry. The ministry was reproached for violating the privacy of the employees and the Rules on the protection of police information and for the endangerment of police procedures, public safety, and safety of the affected employees. The Information Commissioner, Mojca Prelesnik, considered that the disclosure had been in line with the GDPR and the Slovenian information privacy law since the information related to public sector employees, so she did not opt to start an inspection. The Prime Minister, Janez Janša, promised to withdraw police employees from the payment system of public sector employees.

== Work environment and pay ==
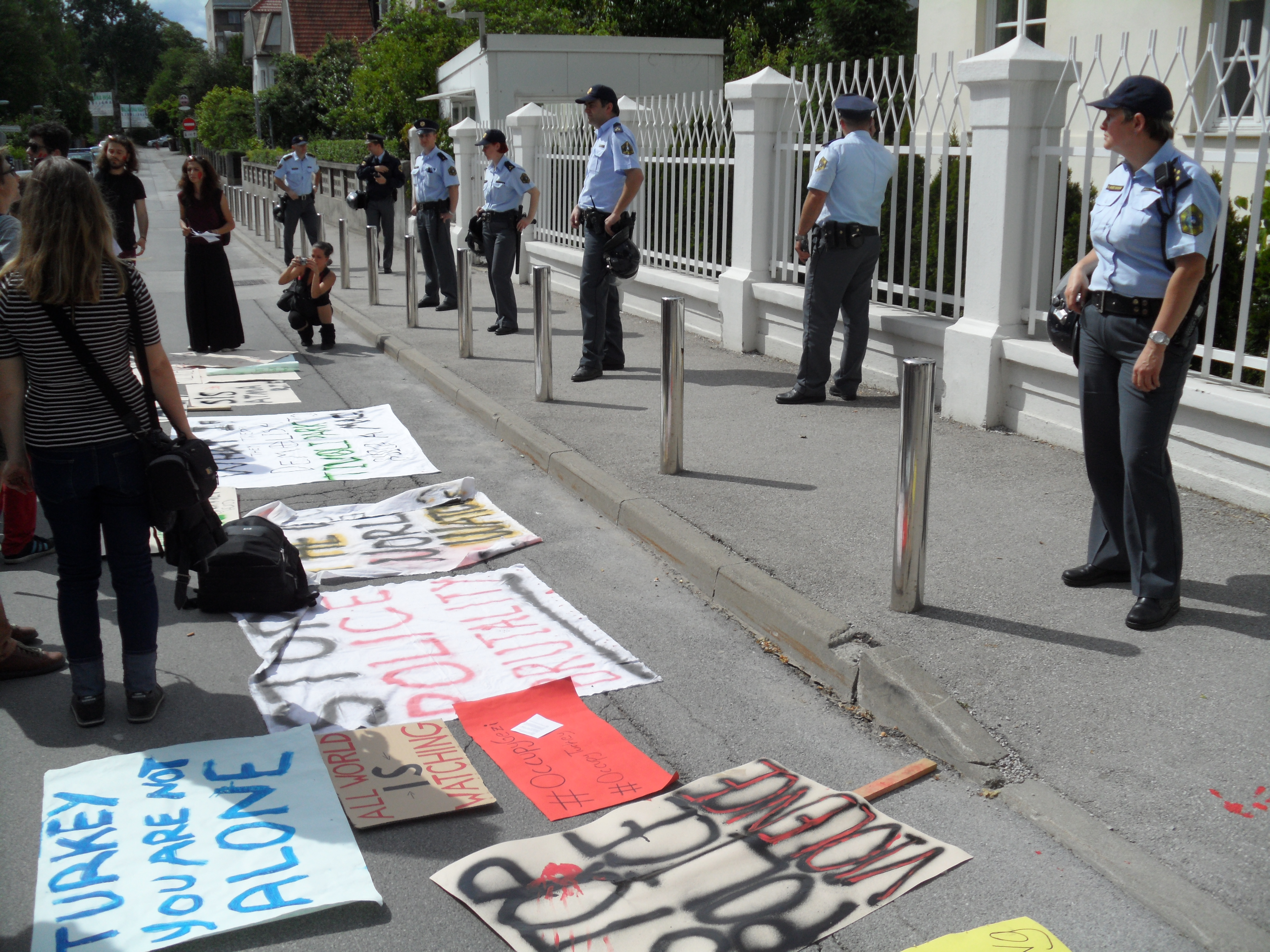
Police officers at a Gezi Park protests solidarity in Ljubljana

Slovenian Police officers have an extremely diverse work week schedules depending on their job assignments which include four-day 10-hour weeks or constant 12-hour, one-day off, 10-hour, one-day off rotations. Patrol officers always work with a partner to ensure maximum officer safety and effective distribution of assets. Other assignments for officers include horse-mounted units, detective specializations, specialized tactics unit and traffic enforcement unit, the majority of these assignments are available after an officer has spent a minimum of two years on patrol.

The starting net salary for police officer recruits during the 18-month academy is just over €6,000. After successful graduation, a police officer is placed into the 26th pay grade with the salary increasing to €9,000 and the rank Police Officer IV. Police officers are eligible for a paygrade advancement every three years, following satisfactory work results. Top-step annual net salary for a police officer with only a high-school education (Police Officer I) is €13,800.

== Rank structure and insignia ==
Insignias indicating the officer's rank are worn on the shoulder of a shirt or jacket. The insignias for regular officers are dark blue with one or more hexagram golden stars and a light-blue trim all-round. Higher-ranking officers have a golden all-round trim. Command staff insignias are embroidered with a golden Triglav-logo. The insignias of the deputy director general and the director general also have embroidered golden olive leaves.

=== Enlisted ranks ===
UK	Candidate police officer	Assistant police officer	Police officer IV	Police officer III	Police officer II	Police officer I
Slovenia	Kandidat za policista	Pomožnik policista	Policist IV	Policist III	Policist II	Policist I
NATO	OR-1	OR-2	OR-3	OR-4	OR-5	OR-6

=== Officer - and general ranks ===
UK	Police inspector IV	Police inspector III	Police inspector II	Police inspector I	Police superintendent IV	Police superintendent III	Police superintendent II	Police superintendent I	Assistant director general of the police	Deputy director general of the police	Director general of the police
Slovenia	Policijski inšpektor IV	Policijski inšpektor III	Policijski inšpektor II	Policijski inšpektor I	Policijski svetnik IV	Policijski svetnik III	Policijski svetnik II	Policijski svetnik I	Pomocnik generalnega direktorja policije	Namestnik generalnega direktorja policije	Generalni direktor policije
NATO	OF-1c	OF-1b	OF-1a	OF-2	OF-3	OF-4	OF-5b	OF-5a	OF-6	OF-7	OF-8

== Complement and equipment ==
As of March 1, 2016, the Slovenian police force employed 6,928 officers, at a ratio of 34.25 officers per 10,000 of the population. It also employed 968 detectives and 87 members of the Slovenian Police Special Unit. Of the force's 2,209 vehicles, there were 1726 police cars (including civilian), 87 response vehicles, 165 all-terrain vehicles and 137 motorbikes. To complement these land vehicles, the Slovenian police utilize 6 boats, as well as 7 helicopters. The police officers in Slovenia were armed with the 7.65 mm Crvena Zastava M-70 handgun, which have been replaced by the Beretta M92 and Beretta 8000. Some units also use SIG Sauer and Glock pistols. Supporting weapons include Heckler & Koch MP5 submachine guns, Heckler & Koch G36 and Zastava M-70 assault rifles.

=== Vehicles ===
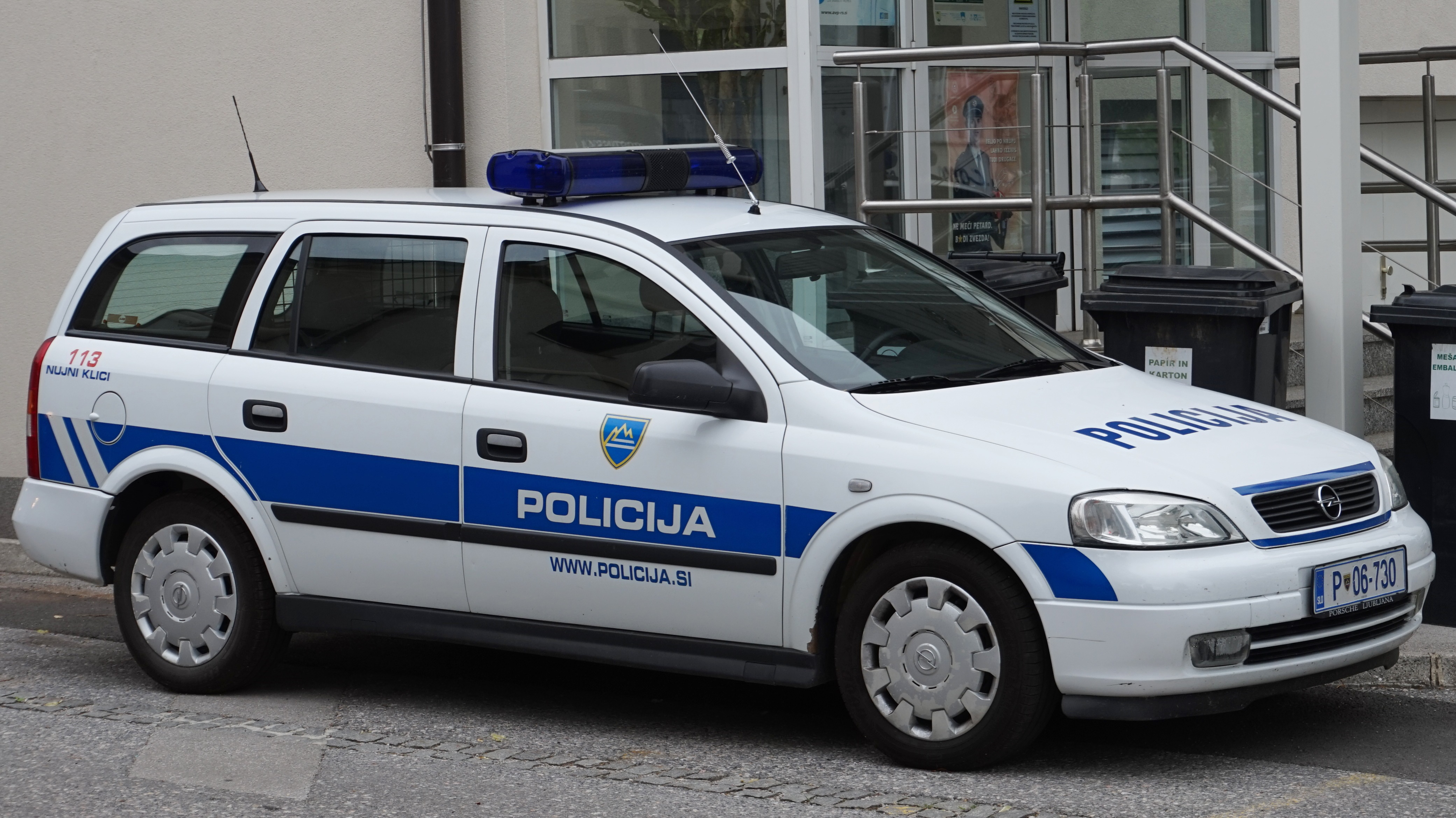
Old cars used by Slovenian police they were replaced in 2017

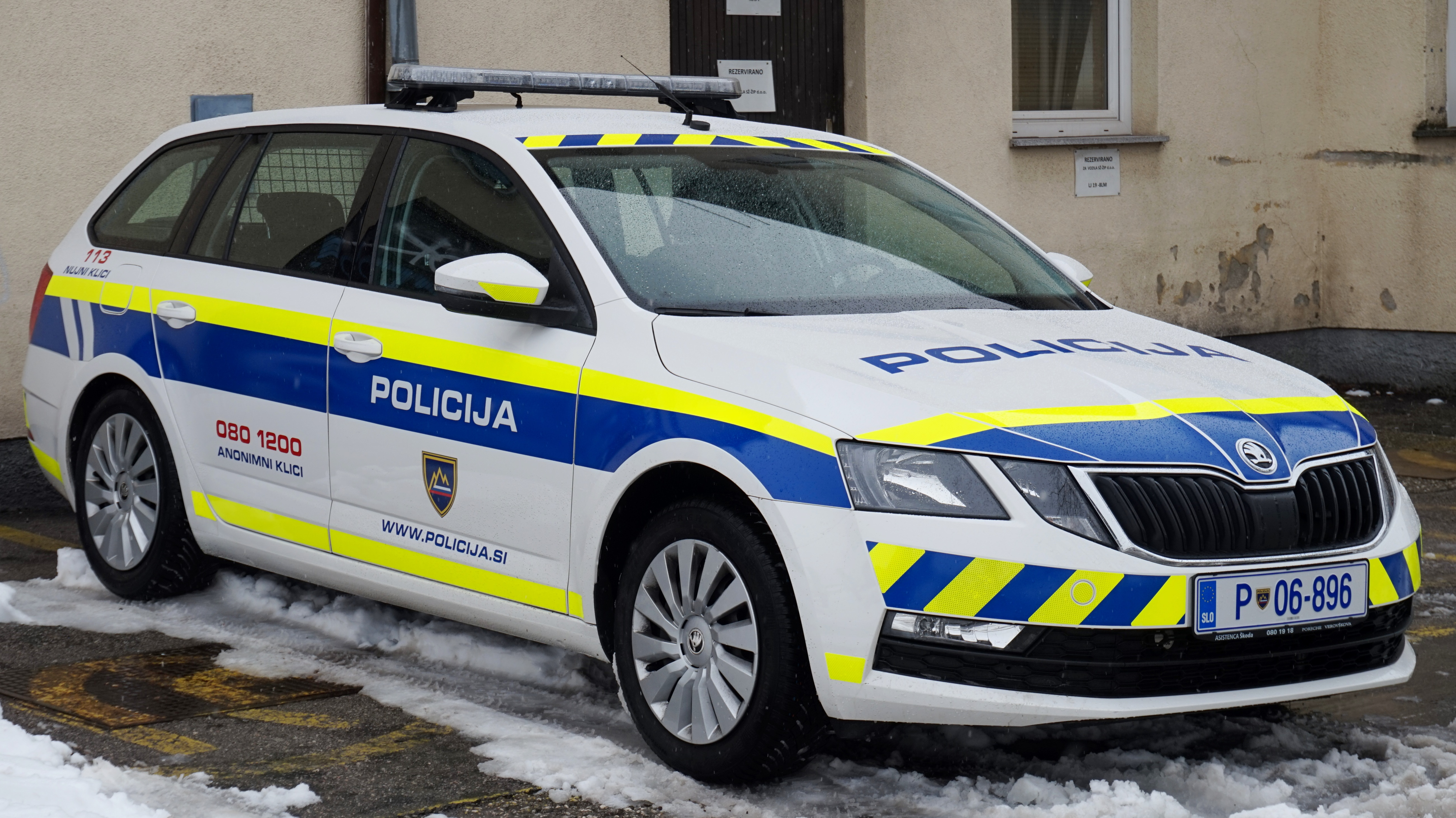
Škoda Octavia III police car bought in 2017

The Slovenian Police currently operate over 2,000 police cars which are used for a variety of different roles. These include the Citroën Jumper, Ford Focus, Volkswagen Transporter, Volkswagen Touareg, Škoda Superb and Renault Master transports and police cars. The majority of the patrol cars consist of the new Škoda Octavia which were bought in the years of 2016 and 2017 and replaced outdated Opel Astra and Škoda Octavia.

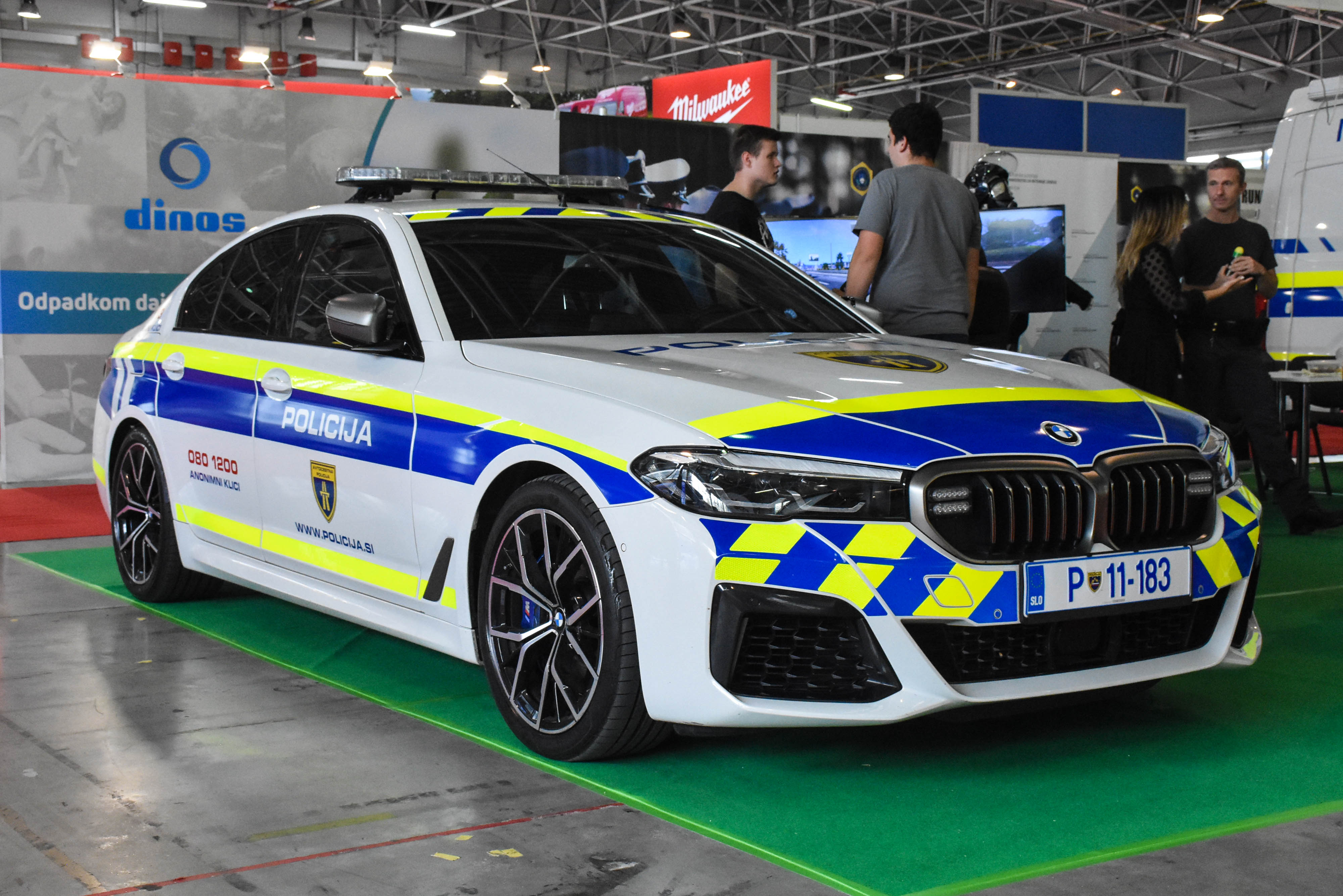
BMW M550i xDrive police car bought in 2021

In recent years, the Slovenian Police have been making an increased effort to replace the outdated car fleet with newer additions. In 2014 the Police ordered 156 Renault Mégane Grandtour police cruisers for the purposes of Schengen Area Border Control, along with 155 VW Golf Variant unmarked police cruisers. In 2015 additional orders have been placed for 14 unmarked VW Golf Variant unmarked police cars, several high-speed Provida VW passat 2,0 TDI police interceptors and 12 new VW Golf Variant marked police cruisers, for the first time featuring newly designed fluorescent-yellow reflective markings to increase visibility at night and poor weather conditions. In 2016 the Police ordered a combined number of 328 new vehicles, ranging from all-terrain 4x4 to specialised patrol unmarked cars, which are set to be chosen and delivered until the end of the year. In 2018 they also got 21 SUVs Seat Ateca.

=== Firearms ===
Model	Origin	Type
Beretta 92	Italy	Semi-automatic pistol
Beretta 8000	Italy	Semi-automatic pistol
Glock 19	Austria	Semi-automatic pistol
SIG Sauer P226	Germany	Semi-automatic pistol
Heckler & Koch MP5	Germany	Submachine gun
Heckler & Koch G36	Germany	Assault rifle
Heckler & Koch HK416	Germany	Assault rifle
Zastava M70	Serbia	Assault rifle

=== Helicopters ===
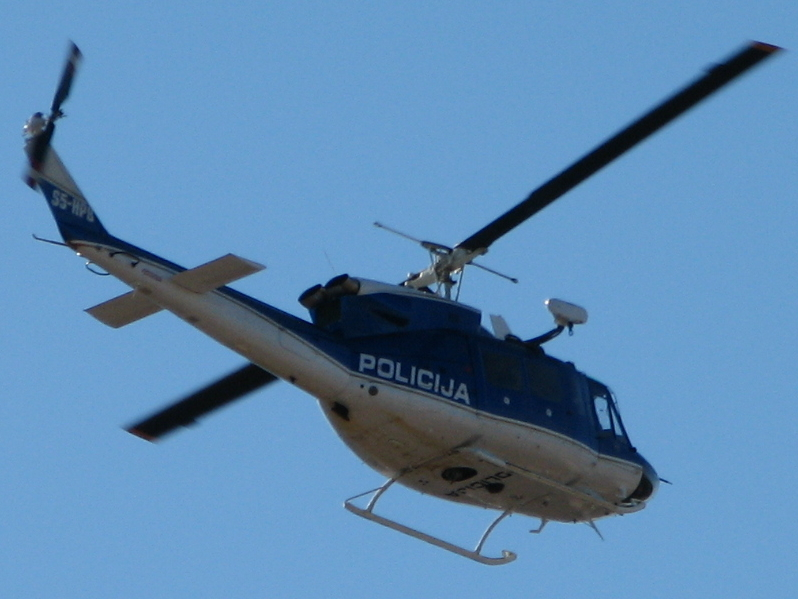
Agusta Bell 212

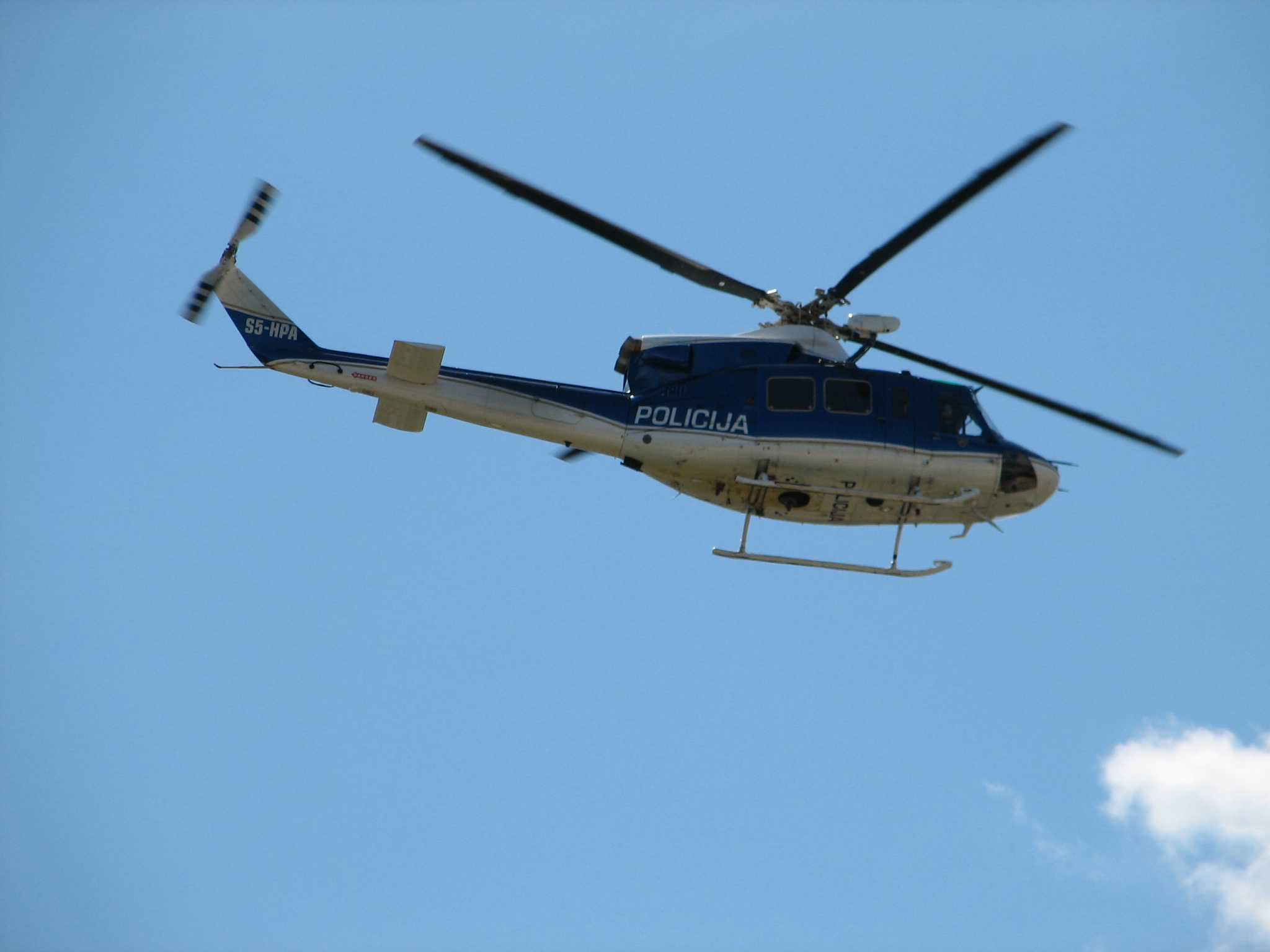
Agusta Bell 412

==== In use ====
Aircraft	Origin	Role	Versions	Registration	Number	Notes
Agusta Bell 206	Italy	Policing	206B-3 JetRanger III	S5-HPD; S5-HPE	2	
AgustaWestland AW109	Italy	Policing	A109E Power	S5-HPG	1	S5-HPG: Border Control & Medico,
Eurocopter EC 135	European Union	Policing	EC-135 P2+	S5-HPH	1	Schengen Area Border Control
AgustaWestland AW169	Italy	Policing, SAR, HEMS		S5-HPI Indra S5-HPJ Julka S5-HPL Lojzka	3	2 ordered (HEMS)

==== Retired ====
Aircraft	Origin	Role	Versions	Registration	Number	Notes
Agusta Bell 212	Italy	Policing	Agusta-Bell AB 212	S5-HPB	1	Retired, on display in Pivka Park of Military History
Agusta Bell 412	Italy	Policing		S5-HPA	1	Retired
AgustaWestland AW109	Italy	Policing	A109A Hirundo	S5-HPC	1	S5-HPC: (Medico version) out of service – sold

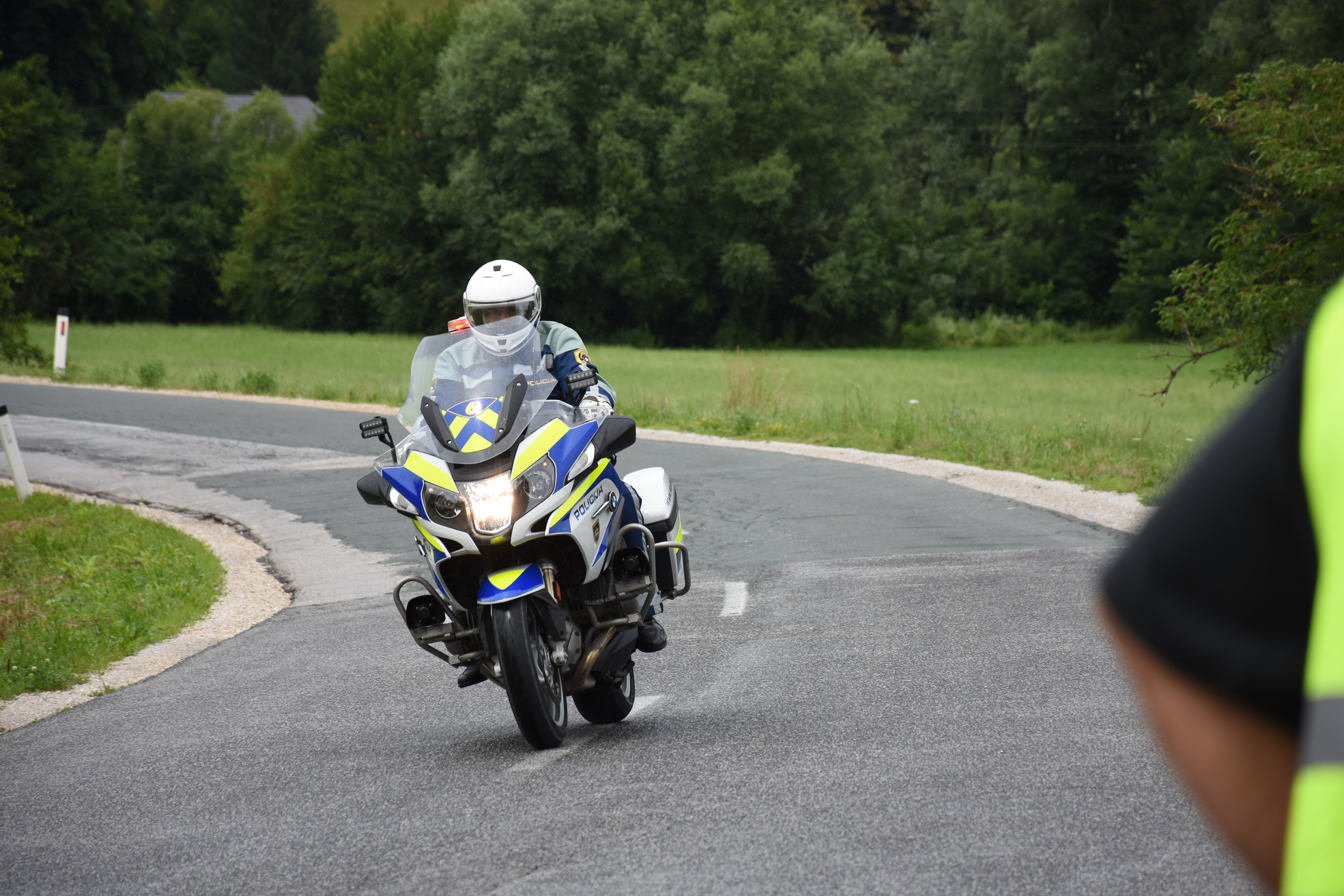
Motorcycle of Slovenian Police

=== Motorcycles ===
Honda Deauville
Yamaha FJR1300AP
BMW R1150RT

=== Patrol boats ===
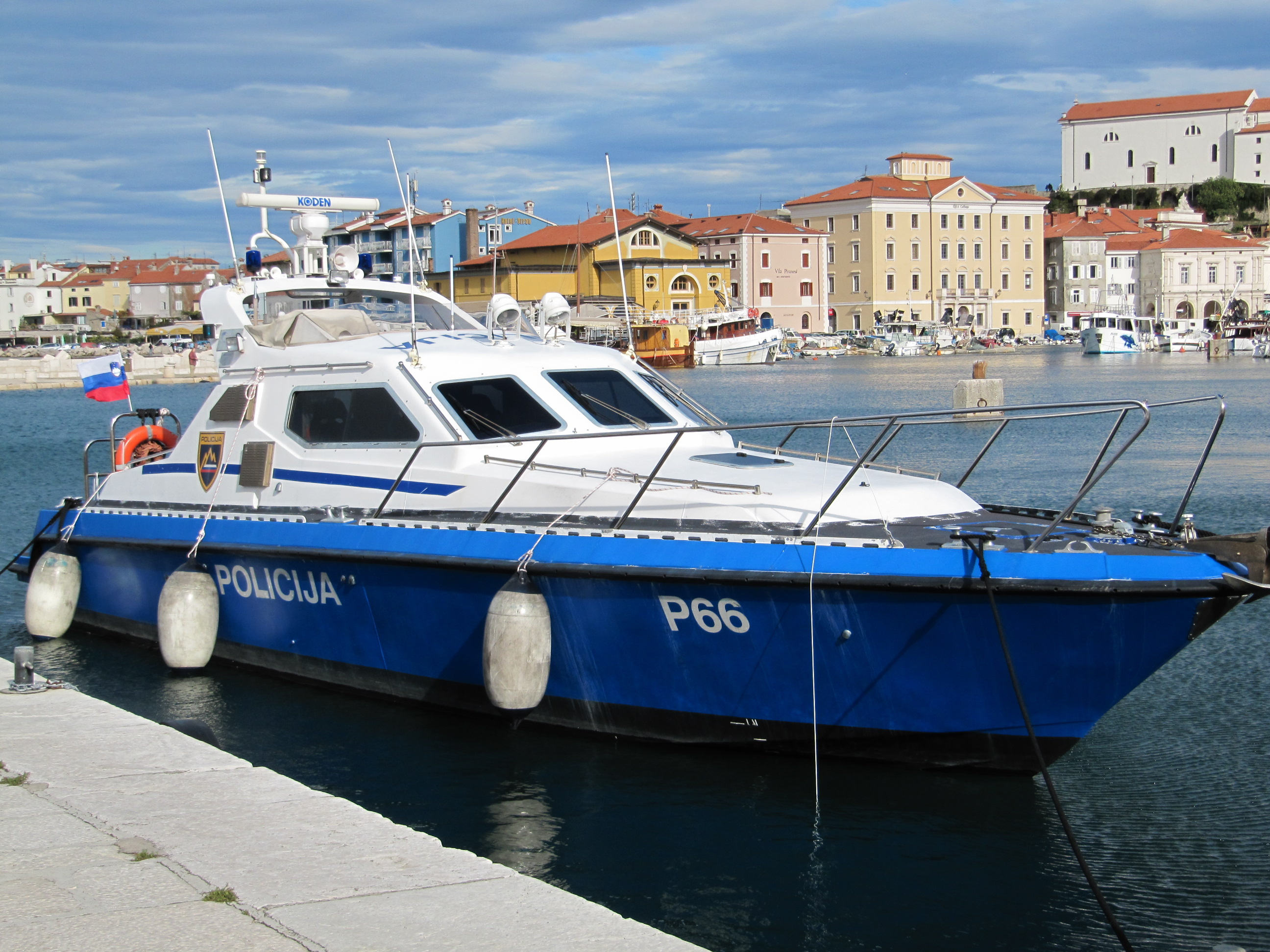
Slovenian patrol boat P-66 in Piran.

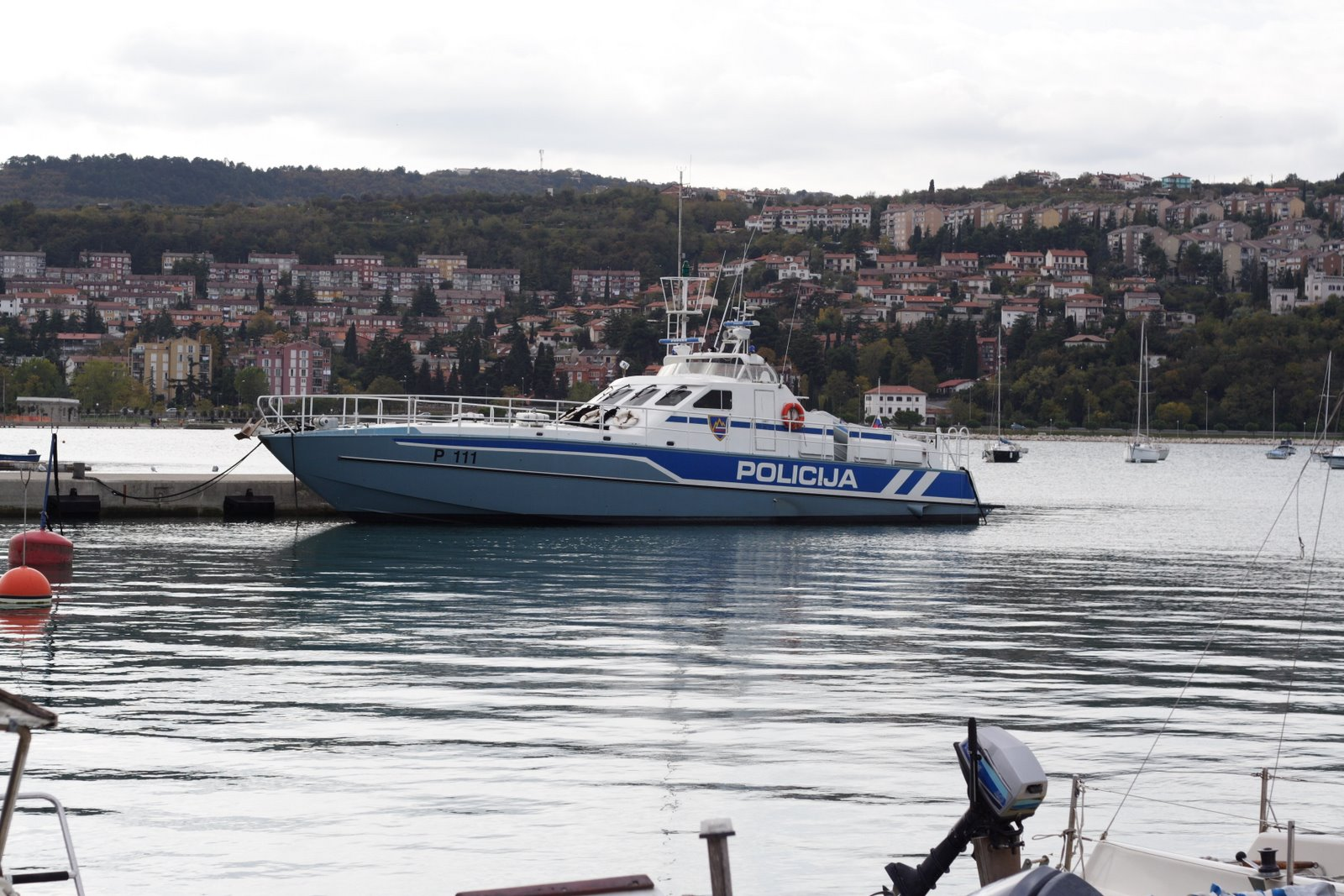
Slovenian patrol boat P-111 in Koper.

P-66
P-88
P-89
P-111 - retired, on display in Pivka Park of Military History
P-08
P-16
