= Boštjan Poklukar =

Slovenian politician (born 1971)

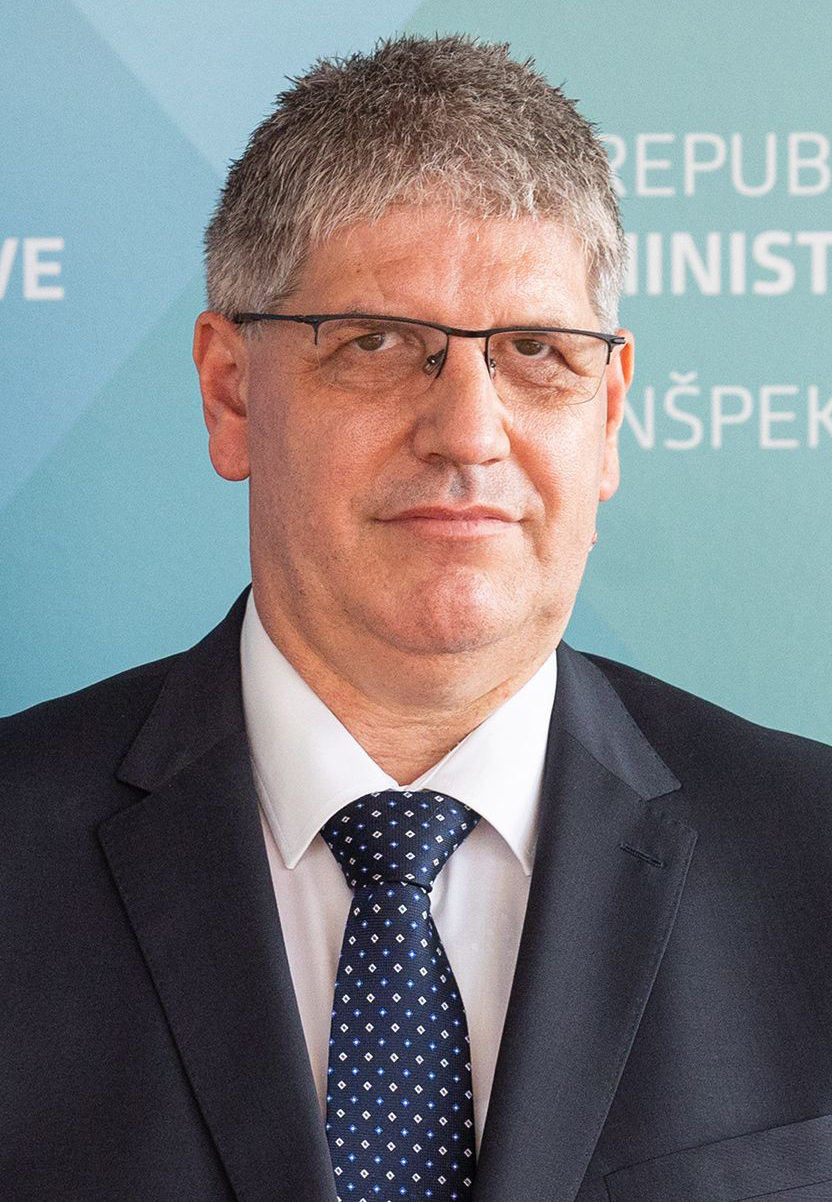
- Poklukar in 2023

Minister of the Interior
- In office 21 February 2023 – 26 October 2025
- Prime Minister: Robert Golob
- Preceded by: Tatjana Bobnar
- Succeeded by: Branko Zlobko
- In office 13 September 2018 – 13 March 2020
- Prime Minister: Marjan Šarec
- Preceded by: Vesna Györkös Žnidar
- Succeeded by: Aleš Hojs

Personal details
- Born: 27 January 1971 (age 55)
- Party: Freedom Movement (since 2022)
- Other political affiliations: List of Marjan Šarec (until 2022)

Boštjan Poklukar (born 27 January 1971 in Jesenice) is a Slovenian politician. He has served as minister of the interior from 2023 to 2026, having previously served from 2018 to 2020. He is the first Minister of the Interior of the Republic of Slovenia to hold this office twice.

He has been a member of the Freedom Movement since 2022, and was previously a member of the List of Marjan Šarec.

On 26 October 2025, he offered to resign, after the killing of a citizen by Romani, and the prime minister, Robert Golob, accepted his resignation. He was officially dismissed on 3 November 2025, but stayed on as an acting minister.

== Career ==
Poklukar holds a master's degree in public administration. He began working at the Ministry of Defence of the Republic of Slovenia in 1991. As a member of the Slovenian Armed Forces, he performed various duties and reached the rank of senior staff sergeant. He received the Bronze Medal of General Maister and the Silver Medal of the Slovenian Armed Forces. As a participant in the Ten-Day War, he was also awarded the commemorative badge Stražnice 1991.

In 2015, he joined the Administration of the Republic of Slovenia for Civil Protection and Disaster Relief, and on 1 September 2017 he became head of the Kranj Notification Center. As an expert in protocol, he also lectures regularly.

== Political career ==
On 13 September 2018, he was appointed minister of the interior in the 13th Government of Slovenia led by Prime Minister Marjan Šarec. In June 2022, he became head of the Military Heritage Administration at the Ministry of Defence.

He was again nominated for minister of the interior by Prime Minister Robert Golob and confirmed by the National Assembly on 21 February 2023 as part of the Freedom Movement.

During his term, on 16 June 2025, joint patrols of Slovenia, Croatia and Italy began operating on Croatia’s external border.

== Personal life ==
He lives with his family in Bled.

== Works ==
- Delam protokol (I Do Protocol), 2011, Šola retorike Zupančič & Zupančič
