= Specialna Enota Policije =

Police tactical unit of the Slovenian National Police Force

- Active: 1 March 1973 – present
- Country: Slovenia
- Agency: Slovenian National Police Force
- Type: Police tactical unit
- Role: Counter terrorism Law enforcement
- Part of: Police Specialities Directorate
- Common name: Red Panthers
- Abbreviation: SEP

Structure
- Officers: 88

Specialna Enota Policije (SEP) (English: Special Police Unit) is the police tactical unit of the Slovenian National Police Force. SEP is utilised for counter-terrorism and other high-risk tasks that are too dangerous or too difficult for regular police units.

== History ==
The establishment of the first unit started in 1973 as a direct response to the hostage crisis at the 1972 Summer Olympics in Munich and the infiltration of the armed terrorist groups inside the Yugoslav territory in the same year.

After the break-up of the former Yugoslavia, the unit continues with performing the tasks and missions it was established for.

== Functions ==
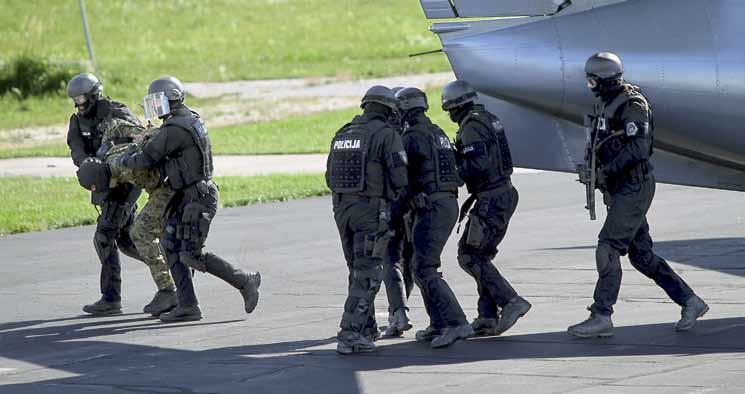
SEP exercise in 2011

- Anti-terrorist tasks.
- Arrest of dangerous criminals.
- VIP guarding.
- Securing locations.
- Co-operation with other Police units and their training.

== Selection and training ==
In order to enter the unit a candidate must be in service for at least six and a half years and have good rating of their work. In addition candidates with special knowledge such as martial arts, shooting and skiing are favored.

Then the candidates are medically examined and then they need to pass various psychological and physical tests. If the candidate passes these tests he is sent to the unit for seven months where his basic training begins. In the third month, candidates face a 14-day test in which they are pushed to their physical and psychological limits. After the completed training a candidate is accepted to the unit. He must then complete a specialization training for a specific speciality he will perform in the unit (sniper, diver, driver, dog-handler, etc.).

== Unit organisation ==
SEP is under command of Police Specialities Directorate, under General Police Directorate. SEP is organised into three sections:

- Command plans and controls the work of the whole detachment.
- Operational Activity Section performs direct operational and intervention assignments.
- Operational Support Section performs logistical and expert support for operational tasks and training.
- Bomb Disposal Section performs Bomb disposal tasks, bomb investigation tasks and other work with involving explosives.

== Common weaponry ==
- H&K MP5 submachine gun
- H&K HK416 assault rifle
- H&K HK417 battle rifle
- H&K G36 (E, K) assault rifle
- SIG Sauer P226 pistol
- Beretta M92 pistol
- TRG M10 sniper rifle
- Steyr sniper rifle
- Blaser Tactical 2 sniper rifle
- SIG SSG 3000 sniper rifle
- Barrett M82 (also M107A1 variant) sniper rifle
- Ultimax 100 light machine gun

== Armored vehicles ==
- 4× BOV-M
- 2x HMV SURVIVOR 1
