= Ministry of the Interior (Slovenia) =

Government ministry of Slovenia

- Ministrstvo za notranje zadeve
- Coat of arms of Slovenia

Ministry overview
- Headquarters: Ljubljana
- Minister responsible: Branko Zlobko
- Website: www.mnz.gov.si

The Ministry of the Interior (Slovene: Ministrstvo za notranje zadeve) of the Republic of Slovenia is responsible for public security and police, internal administrative affairs, and migration in Slovenia.

== Ministers of the Interior of Slovenia ==
- Igor Bavčar, Slovenian Democratic Union / Slovenian Democratic Party (16 May 1990 – 25 January 1993)
- Ivan Bizjak, Slovene Christian Democrats (25 January 1993 – 8 June 1994)
- Andrej Šter, Slovene Christian Democrats (8 June 1994 – 28 February 1997)
- Mirko Bandelj, Liberal Democracy of Slovenia (28 February 1997 – 16 February 1999)
- Borut Šuklje, Liberal Democracy of Slovenia (24 March 1999 – 8 June 2000)
- Peter Jambrek, Independent (8 June 2000 – 5 December 2000)
- Rado Bohinc, Social Democrats (5 December 2000 – 6 December 2004)
- Dragutin Mate, Slovenian Democratic Party (6 December 2004 – 24 November 2008)
- Katarina Kresal, Liberal Democracy of Slovenia (24 November 2008 – 19 August 2011)
- Aleš Zalar, Liberal Democracy of Slovenia (2 September 2011 – 11 February 2012), minister pro tempore
- Vinko Gorenak, Slovenian Democratic Party (11 February 2012 – 20 March 2013)
- Gregor Virant, Civic List (20 March 2013 – 18 September 2014)
- Vesna Györkös Žnidar, Modern Centre Party (18 September 2014 – 13 September 2018)
- Boštjan Poklukar (13 September 2018 – 2020)
- Aleš Hojs, Slovenian Democratic Party (13 March 2020 – 1 June 2022)
- Tatjana Bobnar, Freedom Movement (1 June 2022– 14 December 2022)
- Sanja Ajanović Hovnik, Freedom Movement (14 December 2022 - 21 February 2023), minister pro tempore
- Boštjan Poklukar (21 February 2023 – 3 November 2025)
- Branko Zlobko (21 November 2025 – 2026)
- Franci Matoz (4 June 2026 –)

== See also ==
- Slovenian National Police Force
