= Vesna Györkös Žnidar =

Slovenian politician (born 1977)

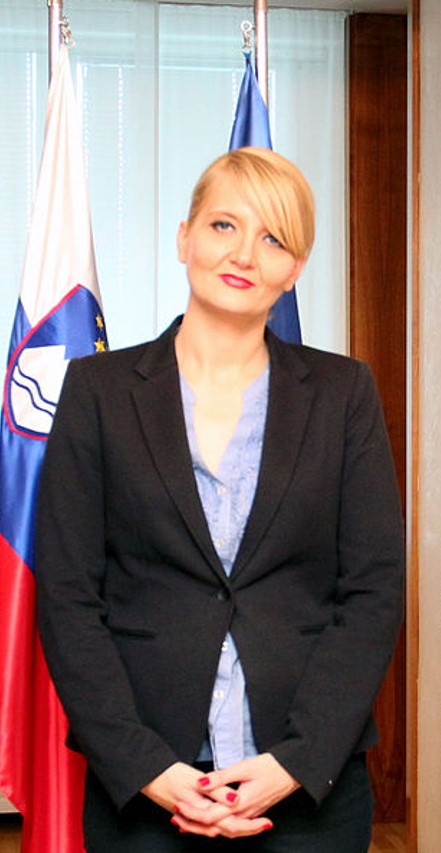

Minister of the Interior
- In office 18 September 2014 – 13 September 2018
- Prime Minister: Miro Cerar
- Preceded by: Gregor Virant
- Succeeded by: Boštjan Poklukar

Personal details
- Born: 29 December 1977 (age 48)
- Party: Modern Centre Party
- Education: University of Maribor, London School of Economics and Political Science

Vesna Györkös Žnidar (born 29 December 1977) is a Slovenian politician who was Minister of Interior in the Cabinet of Miro Cerar between 18 September 2014 and 13 September 2018. She is a member of the Modern Centre Party.

== Career ==
Györkös Žnidar was born on 29 December 1977. She studied law at the University of Maribor and graduated in 2001. She passed the national bar exam in 2003. With her law studies she followed the careerpath of her mother Elizabeta Györkös, who worked as a public prosecutor in Maribor. In 2005 she obtained her master's degree from the London School of Economics and Political Science with a degree in European law. After he studies she started working for the Maribor High Court and subsequently a notary office. Györkös Žnidar then worked for the Office for Money Laundering Prevention and from 2006 at the Bank of Slovenia.

In 2012 she started her own law firm. She kept the firm until being appointed as Minister of Interior in the Cabinet of Miro Cerar on 18 September 2014.

She faced criticism from opposition Slovenian Democratic Party (SDS) in 2015, in a case regarding the arrest of Kosovar politician Ramush Haradinaj at Ljubljana Jože Pučnik Airport. The SDS introduced a motion to remove her from office.

In September 2015, in response to the European migrant crisis Hungary unilaterally placed a fence on the border to Slovenia. After Györkös Žnidar spoke with her Hungarian counterpart the fence was removed and the two countries decided to form joint border controls. In February 2016 Györkös Žnidar announced to limit her country's migration quota to that of Austria. She also announced intensified border controls on the Schengen borders, emergency police powers to the Slovenian Armed Forces, and the drawing up of a list of safe-countries of origin of migrants. In March 2016 the Slovenian parliament passed legislation to quicken the asylum procedures.

On 13 September 2018 the 13th Government of Slovenia took office and she was succeeded by Boštjan Poklukar.
