= Valentin Hajdinjak =

Slovenian politician

- Hajdinjak in 2026

Minister of Defence of Slovenia

Personal details
- Born: 6 December 1973 (age 52)

Valentin Hajdinjak (born 6 December 1973) is a Slovenian public relations executive and politician who is the current Minister of Defence of Slovenia.

== Biography ==
Hajdinjak was born on 6 December 1973, and attended both the University of Ljubljana and the University of Primorska, obtaining a master's degree in management from the latter.

From 1994 to 2000 he was a spokesperson for the Slovene Christian Democrats, and from 2002 to 2009 he was a public relations executive at various government ministries. Hajdinjak's first employment with the Ministry of Defence was in February 2012, when he managed the minister's office staff. Later, he worked in the Intelligence and Security Agency (SOVA).

From August 2015 to July 2020 Hajdinjak was employed in the private sector, performing telecommunications. He was the president of the state-owned DARS company until November 2023.

On 4 June 2026 Hajdinjak was confirmed as the next Minister of Defence, in Ljubljana. He opened and was keynote speaker for the Slovenian International Defence Exhibition and Conference (SIDEC) in November 2026, emphasizing the importance of artificial intelligence, unmanned aerial systems, and the development of a domestic military industry.
