= Gregor Horvatič =

Slovenian politician (born 1977)

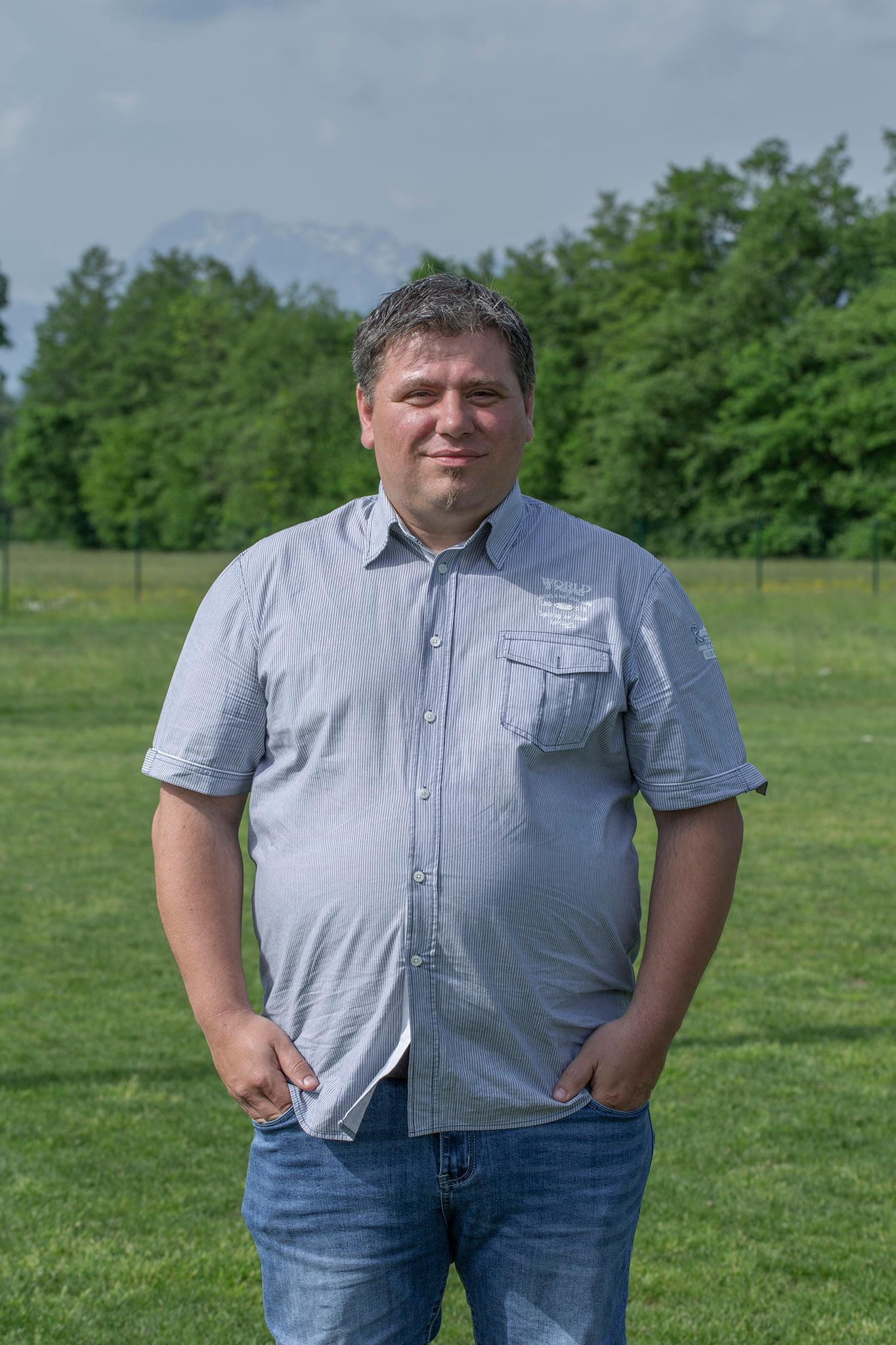
Gregor Horvatič

Gregor Horvatič (born 21 December 1977) is a Slovenian politician, engineer and football manager, former president of Slovenian Democratic Youth (SDM). Currently he leads the department of communications, public relations, and public affairs in NK Dob (English: Dob Football Club). On national football level he is a Member of International Commission of The Football Association of Slovenia (Slovene: Nogometna zveza Slovenije). or NZS).

== Life ==
Horvatič was born in Ljubljana. He resides in Dob, Municipality of Domžale. He studied environmental protection and utility engineering in Ljubljana.

In the field of environmental protection he attend first time as a delegate upon invitation of the UN Environment Programme on the Ministerial Session on “Green Transition in the Mediterranean: From Decision to Actions “ which was organized by UNEP in Portorož, Slovenia within the 23rd Meeting of the Contracting Parties (COP23) to the Barcelona Convention in December 2023.

== Political career ==
Horvatič joined the Slovenian Democratic Youth in 1997. He was elected chairman of the organization at the Congress of SDM in Maribor on 17 May 2008.

Before the election to chairman of the Slovenian Democratic Youth, Horvatič was a member of the National Board of SDM, member of permanent commission of the National Youth Council of Slovenia, chairman of municipality board of SDM Domžale (2003-2009), board and supervisory commission member in the Youth Council of Domzale municipality, and worked as a team leader at a local youth community center Domžale municipality.

On an international youth policy level Horvatič was active as a member of international group of SDM. He was most active in the International Young Democrat Union, the Youth of the European People's Party, Democrat Youth Community of Europe, and the Youth Union of the Alps region, Jungen Alpenregion. On international policy level he also cooperated with the Konrad Adenauer Foundation.

=== 2010 Slovenian local election ===
In October 2010, Gregor Horvatič was elected as the candidate of the Alliance for the Future (Slovene: Zveza za prihodnost). Local elections are designed to elect mayors and members of municipal councils, members of the district and village communities. With his own list he participated in local elections for member in the municipality council of Municipality of Domžale.

=== 2014 Slovenian parliamentary election ===
In the 2014 Slovenian parliamentary election, Horvatič was a candidate of the Civic List, but won no seat.

=== 2014 Slovenian local election ===
In October 2014, Horvatič was elected as the candidate of the Alliance for the Future (Slovene: Zveza za prihodnost). For the second time in his career he participated with his own list in local elections for member in the municipality council of Municipality of Domžale.

=== 2018 Slovenian parliamentary election ===
In the 2018 Slovenian parliamentary election Horvatič was a candidate of the Andrej Čuš and Greens of Slovenia (Slovene: Andrej Čuš in Zeleni Slovenije, but won no seat.

=== 2018 Slovenian local election ===
In November 2018, Horvatič was elected as the candidate of the Greens of Slovenia (Slovene: Zeleni Slovenije. For the third time in his career he participated in local elections for member in the municipality council of Municipality of Domžale and he was elected and won seat in the municipality council of Municipality of Domžale (Slovene: Občina Domžale, pronounced [ˈóːptʃina dɔmˈʒàːlɛ])

=== 2022 Slovenian local election ===
In November 2022, Horvatič was elected as the candidate of the Freedom Movement (Slovene: Gibanje Svoboda, GS), a social liberal and green liberal political party. For the fourth time in his career he participated in local elections for member in the municipality council of Municipality of Domžale and he was elected and won seat in the municipality council of Municipality of Domžale (Slovene: Občina Domžale, pronounced [ˈóːptʃina dɔmˈʒàːlɛ])

== Football work ==
In October 2008, Horvatič was appointed as a vice-president of Football club Vir (NK Vir). He took over the reorganization of the club and began to lead the department for public relations.

In December 2013, Horvatič was appointed as a chief communications officer and public relations officer of NK Dob (English: Dob F.C.)and began to lead the department of communications, public relations, and public affairs. Nogometni Klub Dob (English: Dob Football Club) due to sponsorship reasons is named NK Roltek Dob, and they currently play in the Slovenian Second League.

In June 2021, executive board of football in Slovenia is governed by the Football Association of Slovenia (Slovene: Nogometna zveza Slovenije). or NZS), the governing body of football in Slovenia appointed Horvatič as a Member of International Commission of The Football Association of Slovenia (Slovene: Nogometna zveza Slovenije). or NZS) for mandate period 2021–2025.
