= Anton Olaj =

Slovene police officer (born 1962)

- Born: October 24, 1962 (age 63); Novo Mesto, Slovenia
- Occupations: police officer; jurist

Anton Olaj (born 1962, Novo Mesto, Slovenia) is a Slovenian police officer and jurist.

Olaj was the long-time head of the Criminal Police Office in the Novo Mesto Police Department, which he led from 1994 to 2006. On 29 January 2021, he was appointed to the position of Director General of the Police.
