= Ljubica Jelušič =

Slovenian politician

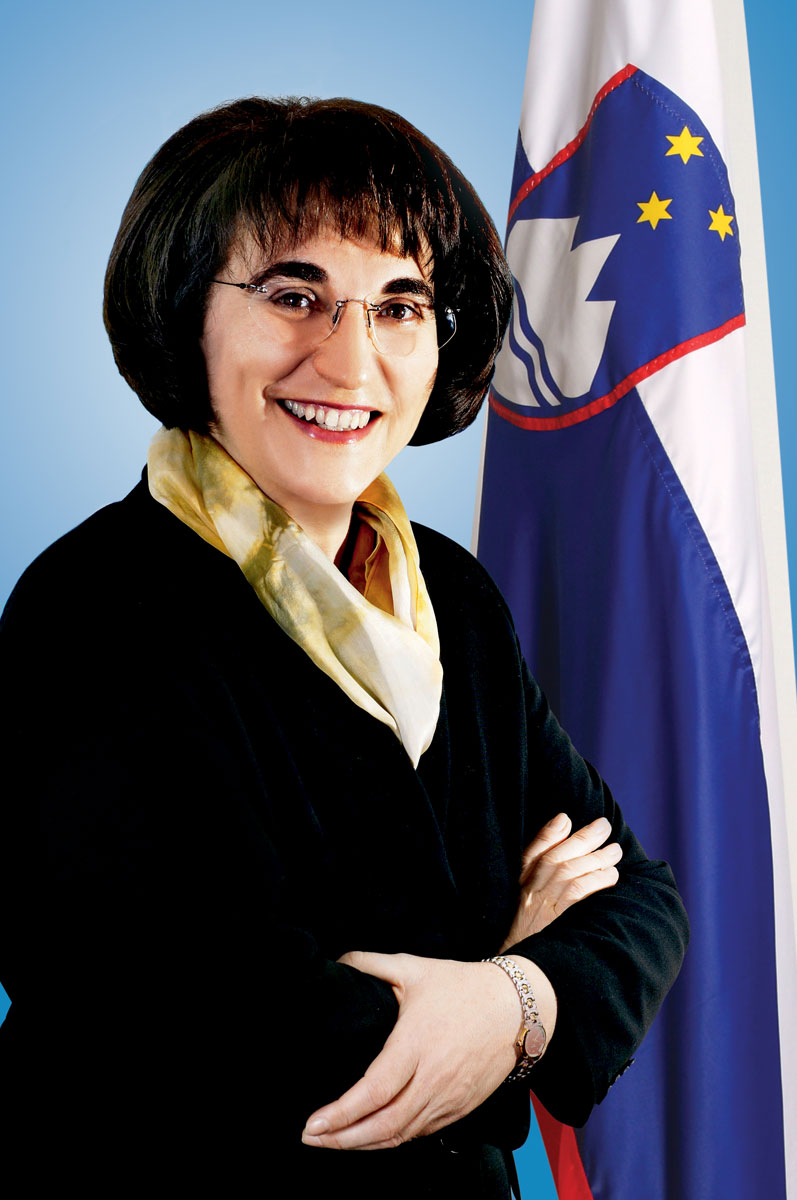

Minister of Defence of Slovenia
- In office November 21, 2008 – September 20, 2011
- Preceded by: Karl Erjavec
- Succeeded by: Aleš Hojs

Personal details
- Born: June 16, 1960 (age 66) Koper, Slovenia
- Party: SD
- Education: University of Ljubljana; Royal Military Academy, Brussels
- Profession: Defence academic

Ljubica Jelušič (born 16 June 1960 in Koper, FPR Yugoslavia) is a Slovenian politician. She is a lecturer in defense studies at the University of Ljubljana's Faculty of Social Sciences, served as Minister of Defence in the government of Borut Pahor (2008–2011), and is a former member of the National Assembly.

== Selected works ==
- Legitimnost sodobnega vojaštva. Ljubljana: Faculty of Social Sciences, 1997. ISBN 978-86-80227-64-1
- Defence restructuring and conversion: sociocultural aspects, (Social sciences). Brussels: European Commission, 1999 [i.e. 2000]. (Co-edited with: John Selby)
- European defence restructuring: military and public view, (Social sciences). Brussels: European Commission, 2001. (Co-edited with: Philippe Manigart). ISBN 978-92-894-1655-9
- Seksizem v vojaški uniformi. Ljubljana: Faculty of Social Sciences: Ministry of Defence of the Republic of Slovenia, General Staff of the Slovenian Armed Forces, 2002. (Co-edited with: Mojca Pešec). ISBN 978-961-235-097-0
- Mirovne operacije in vloga Slovenije (eds.). Ljubljana: Faculty of Social Sciences, 2005. ISBN 978-961-235-229-5

Political offices
Preceded by Karl Erjavec	Minister of Defence; 2008–2012	Succeeded by Aleš Hojs
