= Ministry of Defence (Slovenia) =

Government ministry of Slovenia

Ministry of Defence of the Republic of Slovenia
- Ministrstvo za Obrambo Republike Slovenije
- Coat of arms of Slovenia

Agency overview
- Formed: 1990
- Jurisdiction: Government of Slovenia
- Headquarters: 55 Vojkova St. 1000 Ljubljana
- Annual budget: € 550 million (2007)
- Agency executive: Valentin Hajdinjak, Minister of Defence
- Website: https://www.gov.si/en/state-authorities/ministries/ministry-of-defence/

Flag of the Minister of Defence of Slovenia

The Ministry of Defence of the Republic of Slovenia (Slovene: Ministrstvo za Obrambo Republike Slovenije; Slovene abbreviation MORS) is a ministry of the Republic of Slovenia, in charge of Slovenia's defence against external enemies and natural disasters.

The Ministry is led by the Minister of Defence of the Republic of Slovenia, who is appointed by the Slovenian Prime Minister and approved by the National Assembly of the Republic of Slovenia. The Minister is also part of the government.

The Ministry is located on Vojkova 55 in Ljubljana (Kardeljeva platform).

== History ==
The Manoeuvre Structure of National Defence was founded clandestinely in 1990, in preparation for Slovenian independence from Yugoslavia. Following the adoption of the Declaration of Sovereignty of Slovenia in September of that year, the organisation became an official defence ministry.

Slovenian defence spending climbed from 1.3% of GDP in 2001 to 1.6% of GDP in 2006 with the intention of meeting the 2% required of NATO members. Spending remained stable until 2011, when it was cut to 1.3% of GDP in response to effects of the 2008 financial crisis.

== Organization ==
- Cabinet Minister
- Secretariat Chief Secretary
- DG:
  - Defence Policy Directorate
    - Strategic and Business Planning Division
    - International Operations and Missions Division
    - Nato Division
    - European Division
    - Multilateral Relations and Defence Diplomacy Division
    - Nato Central Registry/EU sub-registry
  - Directorate of Defence Affairs
    - Department of Civil Defence
    - Department of Military Affairs
    - Office of the Information and Communications
    - The National Centre for Crisis Management
  - Logistics Directorate
    - Department for management of real estate
    - Department of standardization and codification
    - Section for fitting
    - Sector Procurement
- Self-service:
  - Intelligence and Security Service of the Ministry of Defence of the Republic of Slovenia
  - Office of Public Relations
  - Service Protocol
  - Internal Audit Service
- Bodies composed of:
  - General Staff of the Slovenian Armed Forces
  - Administration of the Republic of Slovenia for Protection and Rescue
  - Inspectorate of the Republic of Slovenia for Defence
  - Inspectorate of the Republic of Slovenia for Protection against Natural and Other Disasters

== Ministers of Defence of Slovenia ==
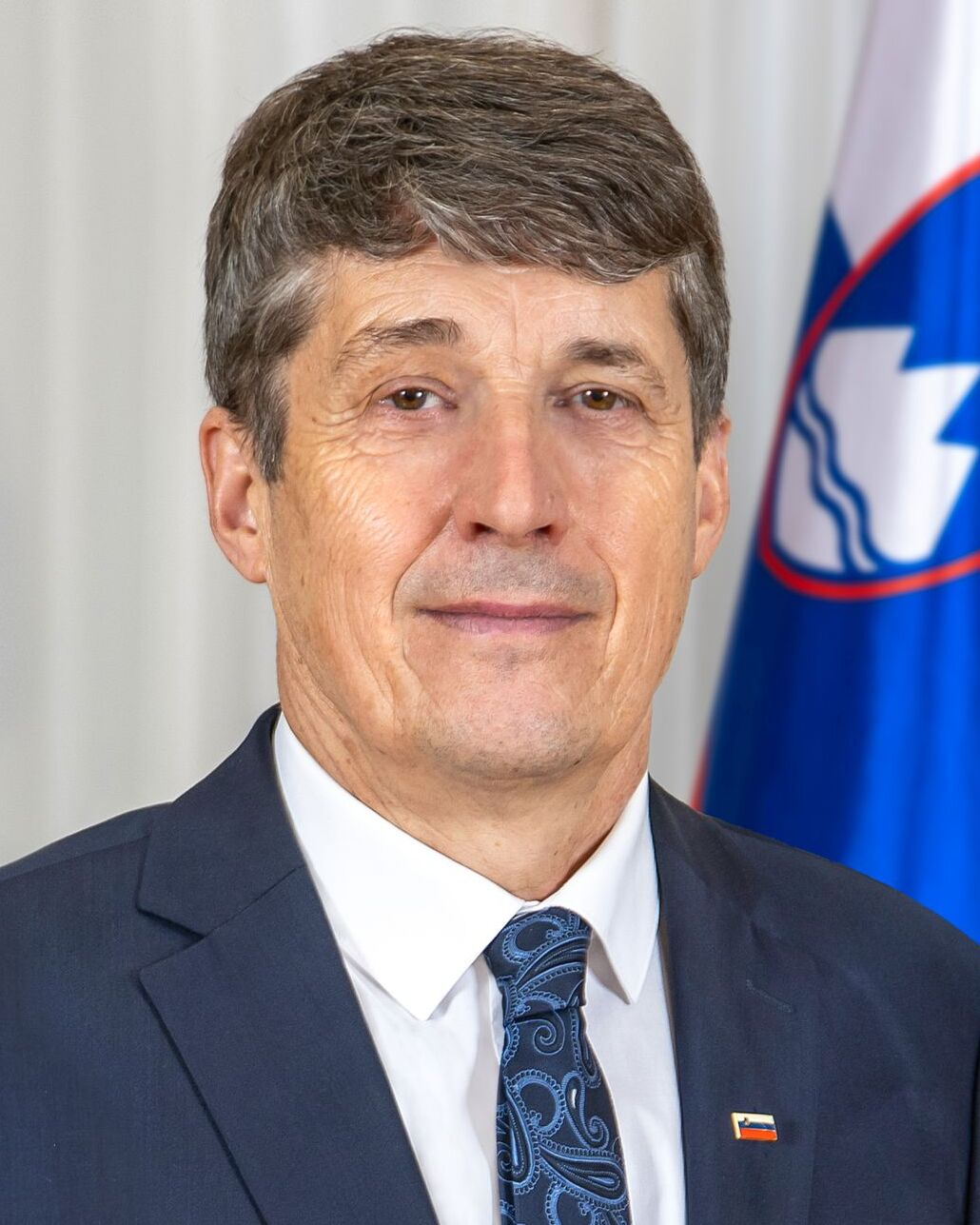
Borut Sajovic

- Janez Janša, Slovenian Democratic Union / Slovenian Democratic Party (16 May 1990 – 29 March 1994)
- Jelko Kacin, Liberal Democracy of Slovenia (29 March 1994 – 27 February 1997)
- Tit Turnšek, Slovenian People's Party (27 February 1997 – 13 March 1998)
- Alojz Krapež, Slovenian People's Party (13 March 1998 – 24 November 1998)
- Franci Demšar, Slovenian People's Party (4 February 1999 – 7 June 2000)
- Janez Janša, Slovenian Democratic Party (7 June 2000 – 30 November 2000)
- Anton Grizold, Liberal Democracy of Slovenia (30 November 2000 – 3 December 2004)
- Karl Erjavec, Democratic Party of Pensioners of Slovenia (3 December 2004 – 21 November 2008)
- Ljubica Jelušič, Social Democrats (21 November 2008 – 10 February 2012)
- Aleš Hojs, New Slovenia (10 February 2012 – 20 March 2013)
- Roman Jakič, Positive Slovenia (20 March 2013 – July 2014)
- Janko Veber, Social Democrats (19 September 2014 – May 2015)
- Andreja Katič, Social Democrats (13 May 2015 – 13 September 2018)
- Karl Erjavec, Democratic Party of Pensioners of Slovenia (13 September 2018 – 13 March 2020)
- Matej Tonin, New Slovenia (13 March 2020 — 1 June 2022)
- Marjan Šarec, Freedom Movement (1 June 2022 – 16 July 2024)
- Robert Golob, Freedom Movement (Acting; 16 July 2024 — 7 October 2024)
- Borut Sajovic, Freedom Movement (since 7 October 2024 – 4 June 2026)
- Valentin Hajdinjak (since 4 June 2026)
