= Tatjana Bobnar =

Slovenian police officer and politician

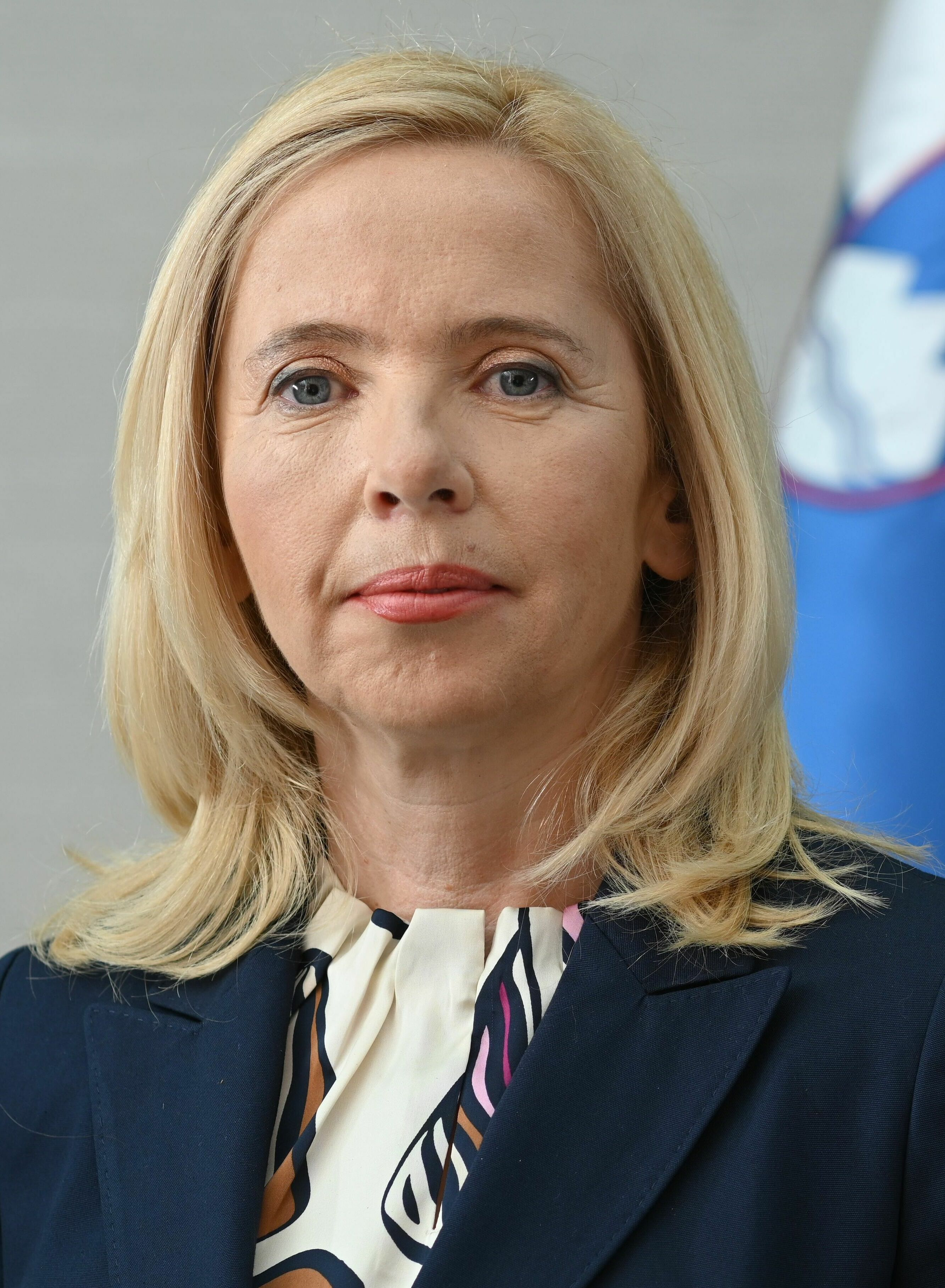
- Bobnar in 2022

Minister of the Interior
- In office 1 June 2022 – 14 December 2022
- President: Borut Pahor
- Prime Minister: Robert Golob
- Preceded by: Aleš Hojs
- Succeeded by: Boštjan Poklukar

Director General of the Slovenian National Police Force
- In office 12 December 2018 – 13 March 2020

Personal details
- Born: 13 June 1969 (age 56) Ljubljana, SR Slovenia, SFR Yugoslavia
- Party: Freedom Movement (Slovenia)

Tatjana Bobnar (born 13 June 1969) is a Slovenian police officer and politician. She has served the minister of interior of the Slovenia until 14 December 2022.

== Early life and education ==
She was born in Ljubljana on 13 June 1969. She attended high school in language and social sciences at Gimnazija Poljane. After her high school, she studied law in Ljubljana and graduated in 1993 with a degree in criminology and criminal law. In 2004, she received a master's degree in law from the same faculty with a thesis on Sexual Abuse of Children in the Family: Criminological and Criminal Law Aspects. Between 1993 and 2019, she attended numerous professional trainings and seminars both on the topic of criminal investigations, child abuse and police leadership.

== Career ==
Between 1993 and 1996, she was employed by the Ljubljana Police department as a criminal investigator in the department of juvenile delinquency. In 1996, she headed the taskforce till 2002. From 2002 to 2007 she worked at the Ljubljana Police department as the head of the operational support service, later she was promoted to assistant director. She was also the assistant director of the Criminal Police Directorate. From 2009 to 2018, she worked as an Assistant Director General of the Police, and in 2012 she also got a job at the Police College.

In 2018, Marjan Šarec's government appointed her Director General of the Slovenia National Police Force. She was relieved of her post in March 2020 after Janez Janša took office as Prime Minister.

=== Minister of Interior ===
On 1 June 2022, she took office as Minister of the Interior in the 15th Government of Slovenia. The handover took place on Thursday, 2 June 2022.

From 1 June 2022 to 14 December 2022, she served as Minister of the Interior in the 15th Slovenian government.
