= Aleš Hojs =

Slovenian politician (born 1961)

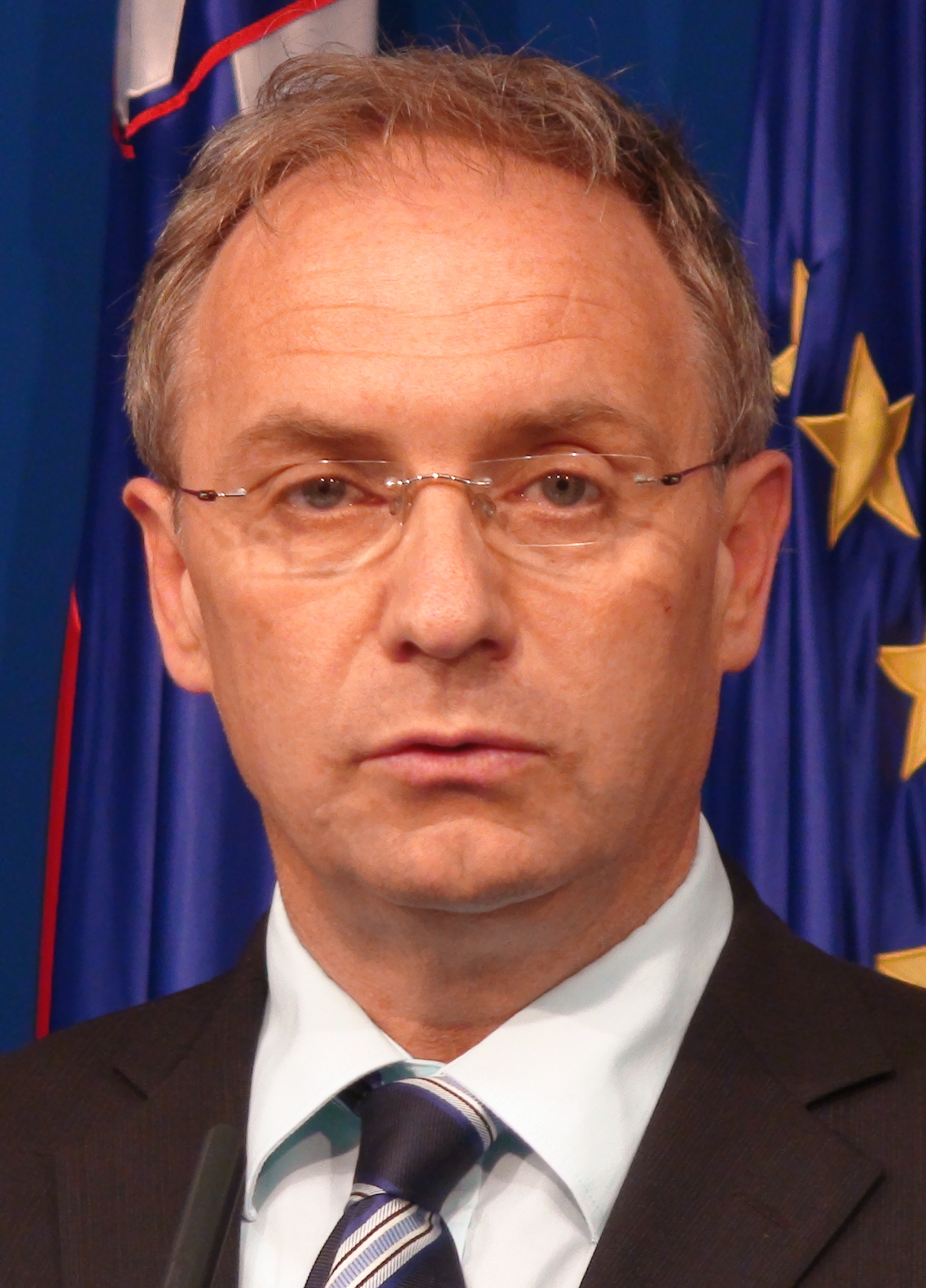
- Aleš Hojs in 2012

Minister of the Interior
- In office 13 March 2020 – 1 June 2022
- President: Borut Pahor
- Prime Minister: Janez Janša
- Preceded by: Boštjan Poklukar
- Succeeded by: Tatjana Bobnar

Minister of Defence
- In office 10 February 2012 – 20 March 2013
- President: Danilo Türk; Borut Pahor
- Prime Minister: Janez Janša
- Preceded by: Ljubica Jelušič
- Succeeded by: Roman Jakič

Personal details
- Born: 12 December 1961 (age 64)
- Party: Slovenian Democratic Party (2016-); New Slovenia (until 2016)
- Education: University of Ljubljana
- Profession: Civil Engineering

Aleš Hojs (born 12 December 1961) is a Slovenian politician, who most recently served as the Minister of the Interior in 14th Government of Slovenia from March 2020 to June 2022. Prior to this, he served as the Minister of Defence from February 2012 to March 2013.

He was born in 1961 in Ljubljana, PR Slovenia, FPR Yugoslavia. He attended the Bežigrad Grammar School and graduated at the Faculty of Architecture in Ljubljana in 1988.

Political offices
Preceded by Ljubica Jelušič	Minister of Defence; 2012–2013	Succeeded by Roman Jakič
Preceded by Boštjan Poklukar	Minister of the Interior; 2020–2022	Succeeded by Tatjana Bobnar
