= Cabinet of Slovenia =

This article is a list of cabinets of Slovenia, the chief executive body of the Republic of Slovenia. Unlike the president of Slovenia, who is directly elected, the prime minister of Slovenia is appointed by the National Assembly and must control a parliamentary majority there in order to govern successfully, even though it is judicially allowed to govern with a minority cabinet.

Since 1990, Slovenia has had 16 governments. The government is formed by political parties that are elected on democratic elections every four years, except if preliminary elections are determined to be held, which has happened two times since the independence. Slovenia has had in total of ten prime ministers, nine men and one woman, since 1990.

== Statistics ==
The longest-serving prime minister to date was Janez Drnovšek, who held the post for 10 years and 45 days (3,695 days) between the years 1992 and 2002. The shortest term is held by Andrej Bajuk, who was on position for 176 days. Alenka Bratušek is the first woman to take the position of the prime minister of Slovenia and until now the only one to do so. The first minority cabinet was led by Borut Pahor in 2012 as two coalition parties: Zares and DeSUS left the coalition. The first preliminary elections followed just a few months after the break up of the coalition. Since then Slovenia witnessed further preliminary elections in 2014, after Prime Minister Alenka Bratušek resigned due to losing the leadership of her party, and in 2018, after Prime Minister Miro Cerar resigned due to a Supreme Court decision overturning the results of a referendum on a railroad track project he supported.

No.	Cabinet	Dates	Days	Prime minister	Coalition parties
1st	Peterle	16 May 1990 – 14 May 1992	729	Lojze Peterle	SKD - SDZS - SDZ - SLS - ZS
2nd	Drnovšek I	14 May 1992 – 25 Jan 1993	256	Janez Drnovšek	LDS - DS - SDS - SSS - ZS - ZLSD
3rd	Drnovšek II	25 Jan 1993 – 27 Feb 1997	1,494	Janez Drnovšek	LDS - SKD - SDS (1993-1994) - ZLSD (1993-1996)
4th	Drnovšek III	27 Feb 1997 – 7 Jun 2000	1,196	Janez Drnovšek	LDS - SLS - DeSUS
5th	Bajuk	7 Jun 2000 – 30 Nov 2000	176	Andrej Bajuk	SLS + SKD - SDS
6th	Drnovšek IV	30 Nov 2000 – 19 Dec 2002	749	Janez Drnovšek	LDS - SLS - DeSUS - ZLSD
7th	Rop	19 Dec 2002 – 3 Dec 2004	715	Anton Rop	LDS - SLS - DeSUS - ZLSD
8th	Janša I	3 Dec 2004 – 21 Nov 2008	1,449	Janez Janša	SDS - NSi - SLS - DeSUS
9th	Pahor	21 Nov 2008 – 10 Feb 2012	1,176	Borut Pahor	SD - DeSUS (2008-2011) - LDS - Zares (2008-2011)
10th	Janša II	10 Feb 2012 – 20 Mar 2013	404	Janez Janša	SDS - NSi - SLS - DeSUS - DL
11th	Bratušek	20 Mar 2013 – 18 Sep 2014	547	Alenka Bratušek	PS - DeSUS - DL - SD - ZaAB
12th	Cerar	18 Sep 2014 – 13 Sep 2018	1,456	Miro Cerar	SMC - DeSUS - SD
13th	Šarec	13 Sep 2018 – 13 Mar 2020	547	Marjan Šarec	LMS - SD - SMC - SAB - DeSUS
14th	Janša III	13 Mar 2020 – 1 Jun 2022	810	Janez Janša	SDS - Concretely - NSi
15th	Golob	1 Jun 2022 – 4 Jun 2026	1,464	Robert Golob	GS - SD - The Left
16th	Janša IV	4 Jun 2026 – present	60	Janez Janša	SDS - NSi - Democrats - SLS - FOKUS
Source: Vlada Republike Slovenije

#	Prime minister	Date of birth	Age at inauguration (first term)	Time in office (total)	Age at retirement (last term)	Date of death	Longevity
1	Alojz Peterle	5 Jul 1948	41 years, 315 days	1 year, 364 days	43 years, 314 days	Living	78 years, 29 days (Living)
2	Janez Drnovšek	17 May 1950	41 years, 363 days	10 years, 45 days	52 years, 216 days	23 Feb 2008	57 years, 282 days
3	Andrej Bajuk	18 Oct 1943	56 years, 233 days	176 days	57 years, 43 days	16 Aug 2011	67 years, 302 days
4	Anton Rop	27 Dec 1960	41 years, 357 days	1 year, 350 days	43 years, 342 days	Living	65 years, 219 days (Living)
5	Janez Janša	17 Sep 1958	46 years, 77 days	7 years, 166 days (Ongoing)	Incumbent	Living	67 years, 320 days (Living)
6	Borut Pahor	2 Nov 1963	45 years, 19 days	3 years, 81 days	48 years, 100 days	Living	62 years, 274 days (Living)
7	Alenka Bratušek	31 Mar 1970	42 years, 354 days	1 year, 182 days	44 years, 171 days	Living	56 years, 125 days (Living)
8	Miro Cerar	25 Aug 1963	51 years, 24 days	3 years, 360 days	55 years, 19 days	Living	62 years, 343 days (Living)
9	Marjan Šarec	2 Dec 1977	40 years, 285 days	1 year, 172 days	42 years, 92 days	Living	48 years, 244 days (Living)
10	Robert Golob	23 Jan 1967	55 years, 129 days	4 years, 3 days	59 years, 132 days	Living	59 years, 192 days (Living)

== Current government ==
The 16th Government of Slovenia was sworn on 4 June 2026. It is headed by Prime Minister Janez Janša.

== See also ==
- Prime Minister of Slovenia
- Government of Slovenia
