= List of governments of Slovenia =

This is a list of governments of the Republic of Slovenia:

== List of governments of Slovenia ==
Government	Prime Minister	Start of term	End of term
1st	Lojze Peterle	16 May 1990	14 May 1992
2nd	Janez Drnovšek	14 May 1992	25 January 1995
3rd	Janez Drnovšek	25 January 1995	27 February 1997
4th	Janez Drnovšek	27 February 1997	7 June 2000
5th	Andrej Bajuk	7 June 2000	30 November 2000
6th	Janez Drnovšek (IV)	30 November 2000	19 December 2002
7th	Anton Rop	19 December 2002	3 December 2004
8th	Janez Janša (I)	3 December 2004	21 November 2008
9th	Borut Pahor	21 November 2008	10 February 2012
10th	Janez Janša (II)	10 February 2012	20 March 2013
11th	Alenka Bratušek	20 March 2013	18 September 2014
12th	Miro Cerar	18 September 2014	13 September 2018
13th	Marjan Šarec	13 September 2018	13 March 2020
14th	Janez Janša (III)	13 March 2020	1 June 2022
15th	Robert Golob	1 June 2022	4 June 2026
16th	Janez Janša (IV)	4 June 2026	Incumbent
