= 12th Government of Slovenia =

Cerar cabinet
- 12th Cabinet of Slovenia

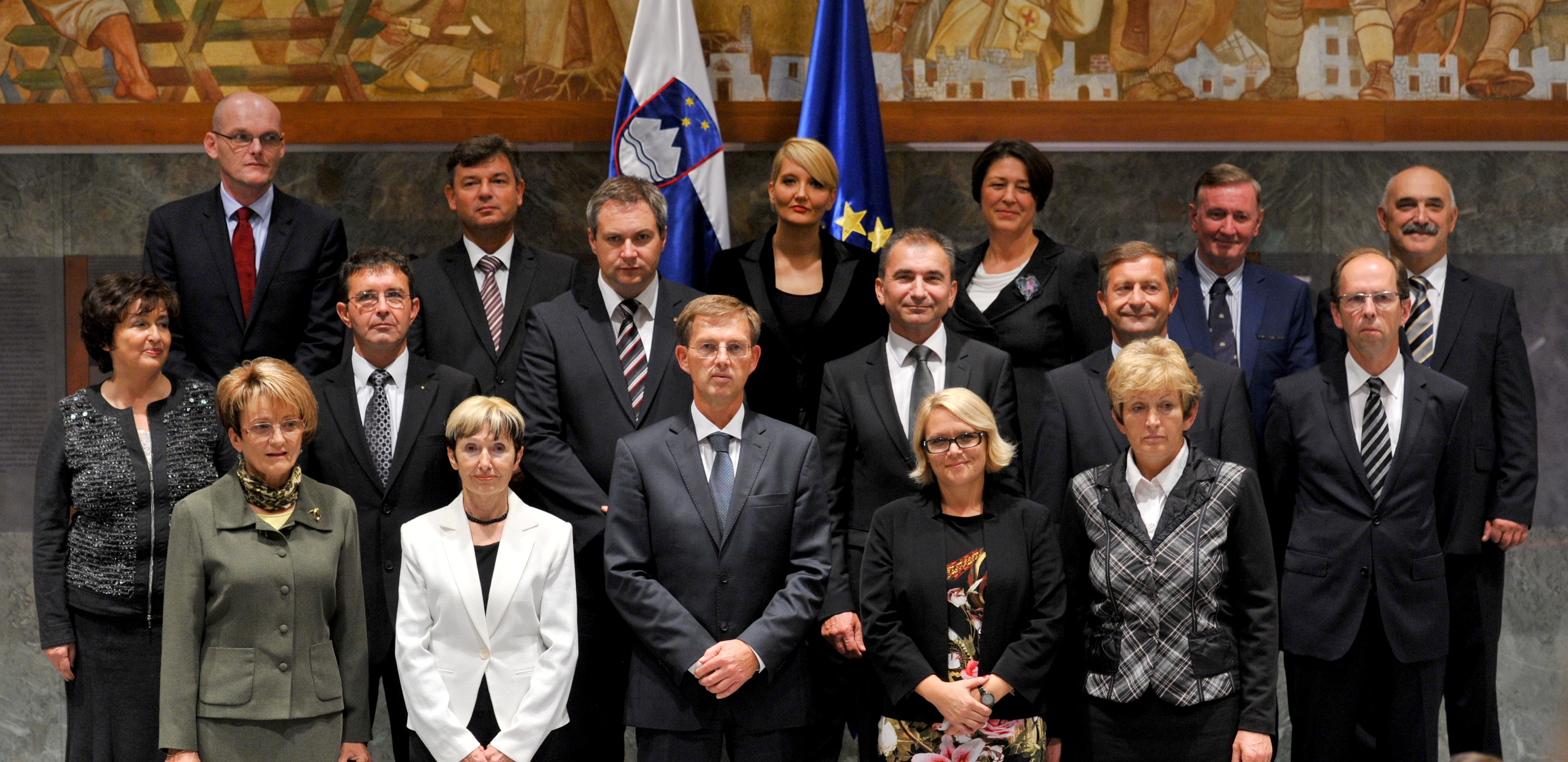
- Date formed: 18 September 2014
- Date dissolved: 13 September 2018

People and organisations
- Head of state: Borut Pahor
- Head of government: Prime Minister Miro Cerar (SMC)
- Member party: Modern Centre Party Democratic Party of Pensioners of Slovenia Social Democrats
- Status in legislature: Majority (coalition)
- Opposition party: Slovenian Democratic Party United Left New Slovenia Party of Alenka Bratušek
- Opposition leader: Janez Janša

History
- Election: 2014 election
- Predecessor: Bratušek cabinet
- Successor: Šarec cabinet

The 12th Government of Slovenia, led by Prime Minister Miro Cerar, was announced on 18 September 2014. It was formed following the 2014 parliamentary election won by the centre-left Party of Miro Cerar; it was the third government formed over four years. At 51 years, Cerar was the second oldest Prime Minister of Slovenia since Independence, following Andrej Bajuk at 56 years. The cabinet had on the day of inauguration the highest number of women ministers representatives, as there were seven women ministers out of sixteen ministers in total. Cerar's cabinet was the highest educated cabinet to date, with six members with a doctorate.

After the resignation of Alenka Bratušek's cabinet, President Borut Pahor determined that the new elections would take place on 13 July 2014. With 34.49% Cerar won by the highest percentage on any parliamentary elections since Independence. It was decided not to cooperate with the Slovenian Democratic Party (SDS), as its leader Janez Janša was sentenced to two years imprisonment. On 28 July 2014 Cerar sent an outline of the coalition agreement to all other parties that attended the coalition talks. The first to agree was the president of Democratic Party of Pensioners of Slovenia (DeSUS) Karel Erjavec, with whom Cerar gathered the necessary 45+ seats in Parliament. The next and last to join the coalition was Dejan Židan with his Social Democrats (SD) party. The coalition agreement was signed on 3 September 2014.

Cabinet members came from three parties of the new coalition:

- Party of Miro Cerar (SMC): 8 ministers and 1 minister without portfolio
- Democratic Party of Pensioners of Slovenia (DeSUS): 3 ministers and 1 minister without portfolio
- Social Democrats (SD): 3 ministers
- Independent (Ind): 1 minister

On the 14 March 2018, following the verdict of the Supreme Court of Slovenia to annul the referendum on the so-called "Second Railway track", Miro Cerar announced his resignation as Prime Minister.

== Changes from the preceding cabinet ==
The number of ministries rose to 16, up from 13 in the preceding Cabinet of Alenka Bratušek. Anja Kopač Mrak, Gorazd Žmavc, Dejan Židan and Karel Erjavec have retained their position.

- Ministry without Portfolio responsible for Development, Strategic Projects and Cohesion was added on the list of ministries without portfolio. With this change, the number of ministries without portfolio rose to two.
- The position of the Vice president of the government was renewed after 14 years, when Marjan Podobnik was the last to hold it. Cerar named three vice presidents.
- Ministry of Interior and Public Administration was divided on two ministries: Ministry of Interior and Ministry of Public Administration.
- Minister of Infrastructure and Urban Planning was also divided on two departments: Ministry of Infrastructure and newly formed (already existent in some previous governments) Ministry of Environment and Spatial Planning.

== List of ministers and portfolios ==
=== History ===
- On 18 October 2014, the minister of economy, Jožef Petrovič, resigned and was the first minister to do so in the new government. He resigned just after one month in the position because of suspicion of wrongdoing when he worked at a company that was rigging prices when dealing with the state. As he stated he resigned "to enable the government to work in peace in these troubled times". The next candidate was supposed to be Gojko Koprivec but he backed down as a candidate when he got seriously ill just one day before the interrogation. After almost 2 months of vacancy, Slovenia got a new minister of economy. On December 4, 2014, the director of Spa Olimia Zdravko Počivalšek replaced the ex-minister of economy Jožef Petrovič.
- On 10 October 2014 after Alenka Bratušek failed as a new European Commissioner designate, Slovenia named a new candidate. Minister without Portfolio responsible for Development, Strategic Projects and Cohesion Violeta Bulc was sent to Brussels where she was confirmed as a new European Commissioner for Transport. With her appointment, the ministry became vacant. Cerar named Alenka Smerkolj as a new candidate. She was confirmed on 19 November 2014.
- On 6 March 2014 Minister of Education, Science and Sport Stanka Setnikar Cankar resigned because of revelation of her high earnings from royalties (636,000 euros since April 2004) After some time (intern minister was Miro Cerar) Klavdija Markež was appointed to take her position, starting on 30 March 2015.
- On 1 April 2015, after five days as minister, Klavdija Markež resigned amidst allegation of plagiarism regarding her MA thesis.
- On 25 April 2016, after she had been summoned by the Prime Minister Cerar to resign due to the delay in the execution of governmental decisions and she had refused to do so, the minister of culture, Julijana Bizjak Mlakar, did resign. The reason was her disagreement with the Prime Minister regarding the management of the Idrija Mine, in regard to which she opined that the governmental decision was dictated by lobbies.

=== Current composition ===
Minister	Party	Portfolio	Period
Miro Cerar	SMC	Prime Minister	18 September 2014 –
Karl Erjavec	DeSUS	Vice president Minister of Foreign Affairs	18 September 2014 –
Dejan Židan	SD	Vice president Minister of Agriculture, Forestry and Food	18 September 2014 –
Boris Koprivnikar	SMC	Vice president Minister of Public Administration	18 September 2014 –
Mateja Vraničar Erman	Independent	Minister of Finance	21 September 2016 –
Vesna Györkös Žnidar	SMC	Minister of Interior	18 September 2014 –
Andreja Katič	SD	Minister of Defence	13 May 2015 –
Zdravko Počivalšek	SMC	Minister of Economic Development and Technology	4 December 2014 –
Goran Klemenčič	SMC	Minister of Justice	18 September 2014 –
Anja Kopač Mrak	SD	Minister of Labour, Family, Social Affairs and Equal Opportunities	18 September 2014 –
Milojka Kolar Celarc	SMC	Minister of Health	18 September 2014 –
Tone Peršak	DeSUS	Minister of Culture	20 May 2016 –
Maja Makovec Brenčič	SMC	Minister of Education, Science and Sport	13 May 2015 –
Peter Gašperšič	SMC	Minister of Infrastructure	18 September 2014 –
Irena Majcen	DeSUS	Minister of Environment and Spatial Planning	18 September 2014 –
Alenka Smerkolj	SMC	Minister without Portfolio responsible for Development, Strategic Projects and Cohesion	19 November 2014 –
Gorazd Žmavc	DeSUS	Minister without portfolio for Slovenian diaspora	18 September 2014 –
Source: Vlada Republike Slovenije

=== Former members ===
Minister	Party	Portfolio	Period
Jožef Petrovič	SMC	Minister of Economic Development and Technology	18 September 2014 – 4 December 2014
Violeta Bulc	SMC	Minister without Portfolio responsible for Development, Strategic Projects and Cohesion	18 September 2014 – 19 November 2014
Stanka Setnikar Cankar	SMC	Minister of Education, Science and Sport	18 September 2014 –6 March 2015
Janko Veber	SD	Minister of Defence	18 September 2014 –13 May 2015
Klavdija Markež	SMC	Minister of Education, Science and Sport	27 March 2015 –1 April 2015
Julijana Bizjak Mlakar	DeSUS	Minister of Culture	18 September 2014 –25 April 2016
Source: Vlada Republike Slovenije

== See also ==
- 2014 Slovenian parliamentary election
- Prime Minister of Slovenia
- Government of Slovenia
- List of governments of Slovenia
