= 1st Government of Slovenia =

Slovenian government

1st Government of Slovenia was elected on 16 May 1990 and was in office until 14 May 1992, when 2nd Government (1st of Janez Drnovšek) was elected. Prime Minister was Lojze Peterle.

Government was formed by the coalition Democratic Opposition of Slovenia (Demos), which composed of five parties: Slovene Christian Democrats (SKD), Slovenian Social Democratic Union (SDZS), Slovenian Democratic Union (SDZ), Farmers' Alliance (SLS) and Greens of Slovenia (ZS).

== Members ==
| Prime Minister | Lojze Peterle (Slovene Christian Democrats) |
| Vice President of Government for Economic Coordination | 1990–1991: Jože Mencinger (Slovenian Social Democratic Union); 1991–1992: Andrej Ocvirk (Slovene Christian Democrats) |
| Secretary of International Cooperation (Foreign Affairs) | Dimitrij Rupel (Slovenian Democratic Union) |
| Secretary of Interior | Igor Bavčar (Slovenian Democratic Union) |
| Secretary of Justice | Rajko Pirnat (Slovenian Democratic Union) |
| Secretary of People's Defence | Janez Janša (Slovenian Democratic Union) |
| Secretary of Finance | 1990–1991: Marko Kranjec (Independent); 1991–1992: Dušan Šešok (Slovene Christian Democrats) |
| Secretary of Education | Peter Vencelj (Slovene Christian Democrats) |
| Secretary of Culture | Andrej Capuder (Slovene Christian Democrats) |
| Secretary of Social Affairs | Jožica Puhar (Party of Democratic Renewal) |
| Secretary of Health | 1990–1992: Katja Boh (Slovenian Social Democratic Union); 1992: Božidar Voljč |
| Secretary of Industry | Izidor Rejc (Slovene Christian Democrats) |
| Secretary of Agriculture | Jožef Osterc (Slovenian People's Party) |
| Secretary of Environment | Miha Jazbinšek (Greens of Slovenia) |
| Secretary of Transport | Marjan Kranjc |
| Secretary of Research and Technology | Peter Tancig (Greens of Slovenia) |
| Secretary of Information | 1990–1991: Stane Stanič; 1991–1992: Jelko Kacin (Slovenian Democratic Union) |

== See also ==
- List of governments of Slovenia
