= 8th Government of Slovenia =

Janša I cabinet
- 8th Cabinet of Slovenia

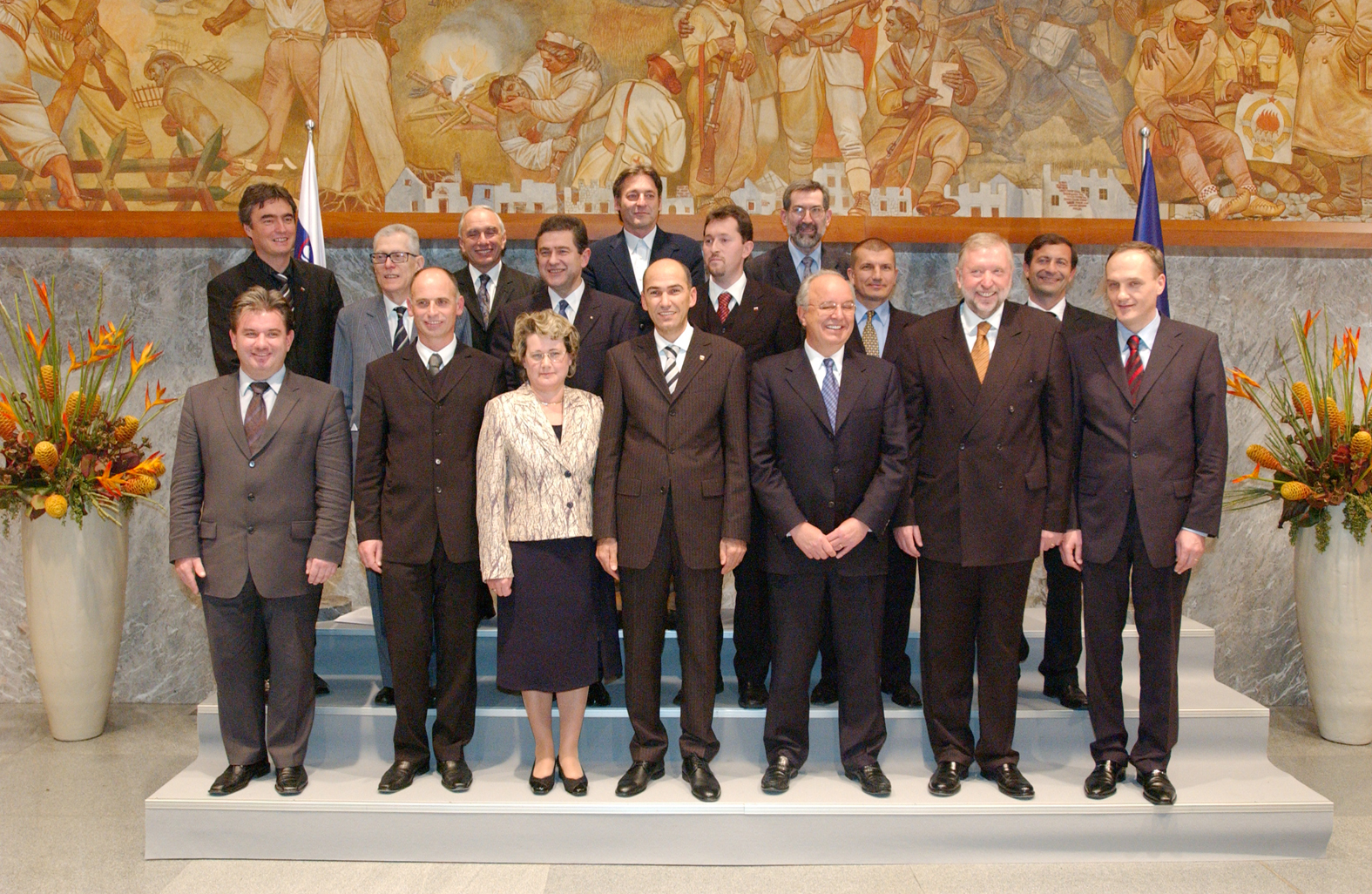
- Date formed: 3 December 2004
- Date dissolved: 21 November 2008

People and organisations
- Head of state: Janez Drnovšek; Danilo Türk
- Head of government: Janez Janša
- Member party: Slovenian Democratic Party (SDS) New Slovenia (NSi) Slovenian People's Party (SLS) Democratic Party of Pensioners of Slovenia (DeSUS)
- Status in legislature: Majority (coalition)
- Opposition party: Liberal Democracy of Slovenia (LDS) United List of Social Democrats (ZLSD) Slovenian National Party (SNS)
- Opposition leader: Anton Rop (until 2005); Jelko Kacin (2005-2007); Katarina Kresal (since 2007)

History
- Election: 2004 Slovenian parliamentary election
- Predecessor: Rop cabinet
- Successor: Pahor Cabinet

The 8th Government of Slovenia led by Prime Minister Janez Janša was announced on 3 December 2004. The government was formed after the 2004 Slovenian parliamentary election. It was the first government of Janez Janša, and third centre-right government in the history of the Republic of Slovenia. Slovenian Democratic Party won on the elections 29% of the votes and so became the strongest parliamentary party in the National Assembly. The party nominated Janez Janša as the candidate for the mandatary, who was confirmed by the president Janez Drnovšek. It was one of the most stable governments of Slovenia, which ruled in the times of the greatest economical boom. In 2004–2006, the economy grew on average by nearly 5% a year in Slovenia; in 2007, it expanded by almost 7%. The growth surge was fuelled by debt, particularly among firms, and especially in construction. The price for a boom that veered out of control has been paid in years from 2009 onwards.

Cabinet members came from four parties of the new coalition and Independent candidates:

- Slovenian Democratic Party (SDS) - 6 Ministers - 6 Ministers + 1 Minister without portfolio at the end of the term
- New Slovenia (NSi) - 4 Minister
- Democratic Party of Pensioners of Slovenia (DeSUS) - 1 Minister
- SLS - 2 Ministers + 1 Minister without portfolio
- 3 Independent Ministers - 2 Independent Ministerst at the end of the term

== Changes from the preceding cabinet ==
The number of ministries was raised from 16 in the Rop cabinet to 17. It was the third government led by the centre-right party.

- Ministry of Education was divided on to two ministries: Ministry of Higher Education and Ministry of Education. The first covered the fields of higher and academic education and the second the fields of primary and secondary education.
- Ministry of Legislation was renamed to Ministry of Justice.

== List of ministers and portfolios ==
=== History ===
- The first interpellation was given to Minister of Culture Vasko Simoniti in October 2006, which was later refused by National Assembly on 30 of November 2006.
- The first change was made on 27 March 2006 when Jože Damjan was replaced with at the time Independent candidate Andrej Horvat.
- The next change to follow was the replacement of Janez Drobnič, minister of Minister of Social Affairs. The prime minister Janša proposed his dismissal because statements about how to rise fertility in country. Many were also discontented with his work. Marjeta Cotman replaced him on the position. The change of Janez Drobnič trigged a mini coalition crisis as there were many ministers people and Janša were displeased with, among them also Dragutin Mate (poor treatment with Roma minority in Slovenia), Dimitrij Rupel (The Economist marked his diplomatic capabilities as "clumsy"), Jure Zupan, Marija Lukačič (incompetence and difficulties with communication with the media) and Vasko Simoniti who at the time recently "survived" interpellation.
- The second interpellation was against the Minister of Health Andrej Bručan that was filed by Liberal Democracy of Slovenia (LDS) on 11 October 2006. The minister underwent the interpellation and continued with his work.
- On 30 October 2007 ministers Andrej Bručan (health issues), Janez Božič and Jure Zupan resigned from their positions. Janša accepted their resignation and named new ministers. The new Minister of Health became Zofija Mazej Kukovič, the new Minister for Transport Radovan Žerjav and the new Ministry of Higher Education Mojca Kucler Dolinar.

=== Composition at the end of the mandate ===
Minister	Party	Portfolio	Period
Janez Janša	SDS	Prime Minister	3 December 2004 – 21 November 2008
Karl Erjavec	DeSUS	Minister of Defence	3 December 2004 – 21 November 2008
Zofija Mazej Kukovič	SDS	Minister of Health	11 September 2007 – 21 November 2008
Radovan Žerjav	SLS	Minister of Transport	11 September 2007 – 21 November 2008
Andrej Bajuk	NSi	Minister of Finance	3 December 2004 – 21 November 2008
Milan Zver	SDS	Minister of Education	3 December 2004 – 21 November 2008
Mojca Kucler Dolinar	NSi	Minister of Higher Education	1 October 2007 – 21 November 2008
Janez Podobnik	SLS	Minister of Environment	3 December 2004 – 21 November 2008
Andrej Vizjak	SDS	Minister of Economy	3 December 2004 – 21 November 2008
Dragutin Mate	SDS	Minister of Interior	3 December 2004 – 21 November 2008
Marjeta Cotman	NSi	Minister of Social Affairs	18 December 2006 – 21 November 2008
Dimitrij Rupel	Independent	Minister of Foreign Affairs	3 December 2004 – 21 November 2008
Lovro Šturm	NSi	Minister of Justice	3 December 2004 – 21 November 2008
Vasko Simoniti	SDS	Minister of Culture	3 December 2004 – 21 November 2008
Iztok Jarc	SDS	Minister of Agriculture	6 March 2007 – 21 November 2008
Gregor Virant	Independent	Minister of Public Administration	3 December 2004 – 21 November 2008
Ivan Žagar	SLS	Minister without portfolio for Local Autonomies and Regional Development	3 December 2004 – 21 November 2008
Žiga Turk	SDS	Minister without portfolio for Economic Development	6 March 2007 – 21 November 2008
Vlada Republike Slovenije

=== Former members ===
Minister	Party	Portfolio	Period
Jure Zupan	NSi	Minister of Higher Education	3 December 2004 – 1 October 2007
Andrej Bručan	SDS	Minister of Health	3 December 2004 – 11 September 2007
Janez Drobnič	NSi	Minister of Social Affairs	3 December 2004 – 1 December 2006
Marija Lukačič	SDS	Minister of Agriculture	3 December 2004 – 6 March 2007
Janez Božič	SLS	Minister of Transport	3 December 2004 – 11 September 2007
Jože Damjan	Independent	Minister without portfolio for Economic Development	3 December 2004 – 27 March 2006
Andrej Horvat	Independent - SD	Minister without portfolio for Economic Development	27 March 2006 – 6 March 2007
Source: Vlada Republike Slovenije

== See also ==
- 2004 Slovenian parliamentary election
- Prime Minister of Slovenia
- Government of Slovenia
- List of cabinets of Slovenia
