= Mihael Brejc =

Slovenian politician

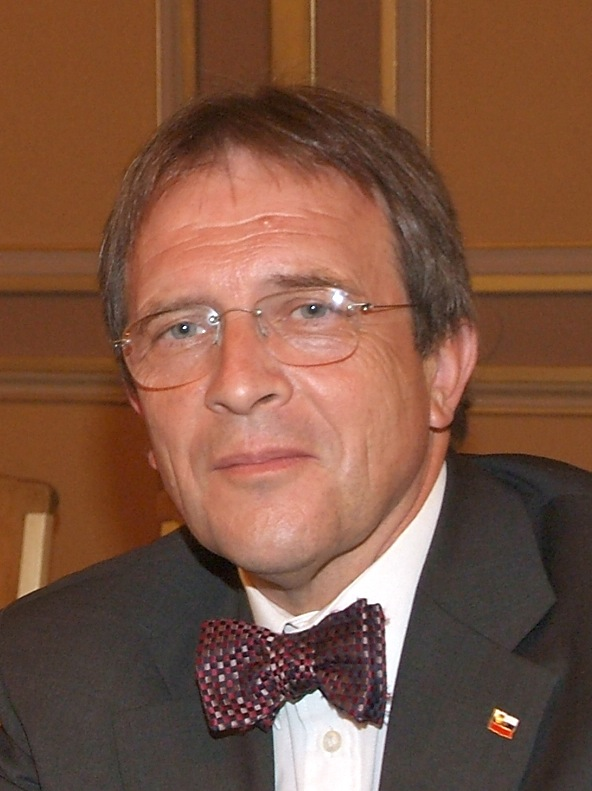
Mihael Brejc (2005)

Mihael "Miha" Brejc (born 15 November 1947) is a Slovenian politician and former Member of the European Parliament.

In 2004, Brejc was elected to the European Parliament. He was part of the European People's Party parliamentary group and served as member of the Committee on Civil Liberties, Justice and Home Affairs. He was also vice-chairman of the Subcommittee on Security and Defence, a substitute for the Committee on Employment and Social Affairs, member of the Delegation for relations with South Africa, and a substitute for the delegation to the ACP-EU Joint Parliamentary Assembly.

== Biography ==
Miha Brejc was born to a Slovene family in Belgrade, Serbia, Yugoslavia. His father was Tomo Brejc, an influential antifascist left-wing trade unionist who had emigrated from the Julian March to the Kingdom of Yugoslavia in the 1920s and fought as a partisan in the Yugoslav People's Liberation War. The family moved back to Slovenia when Miha Brejc was still a child. He studied at the University of Ljubljana, where he graduated in sociology in 1975. He continued his studies at the same university, obtaining a master's degree in 1983 and a PhD in organisational sciences in 1985. He worked at the University of Ljubljana since 1988, first as a senior lecturer and later as a professor.

After the victory of the DEMOS coalition at the first democratic elections in 1990, Brejc was appointed Director of the Slovenian Security and Intelligence Service. He carried out the difficult task of democratization and pluralization of an institution that had served as one of the columns of political oppression during Communist times. In 1992, he joined the Social Democratic Party of Slovenia. In 1993, he was dismissed as director of the Security Agency by the then Prime Minister Janez Drnovšek, and returned to the academia.

From 1994 to 1998 he was actively involved in local politics as the chairman of the Municipal Council of Domžale. During the same period, he also served as the dean of the High School for Public Administration of the University of Ljubljana. During this time, he advanced several proposals for the reform and modernization of the public administration system in Slovenia.

In 1995 he was elected vice-president of Social Democratic Party of Slovenia. In 2000, he became the minister of labour, family and social affairs in the short-lived centre-right government led by Andrej Bajuk. In 2000, he was elected to the Slovenian Parliament and from 2000 to 2004 he served as vice-president of the National Assembly of Slovenia.

He is also the chairman of the Slovenia-Taiwan Friendship Association.

His older brother, Tomaž Brejc, is an art critic. His son, Tomo Brejc is a photographer. His son-in-law, Gregor Virant, was the Minister for Public Administration in Janez Janša's government and was the leader of a liberal political party (the Civic List).

Political offices
Preceded by Anton Rop	Minister of Labour, Family and Social Affairs; May 3–November 17, 2000	Succeeded by Vlado Dimovski
