= 10th Government of Slovenia =

Janša II cabinet
- 10th Cabinet of Slovenia

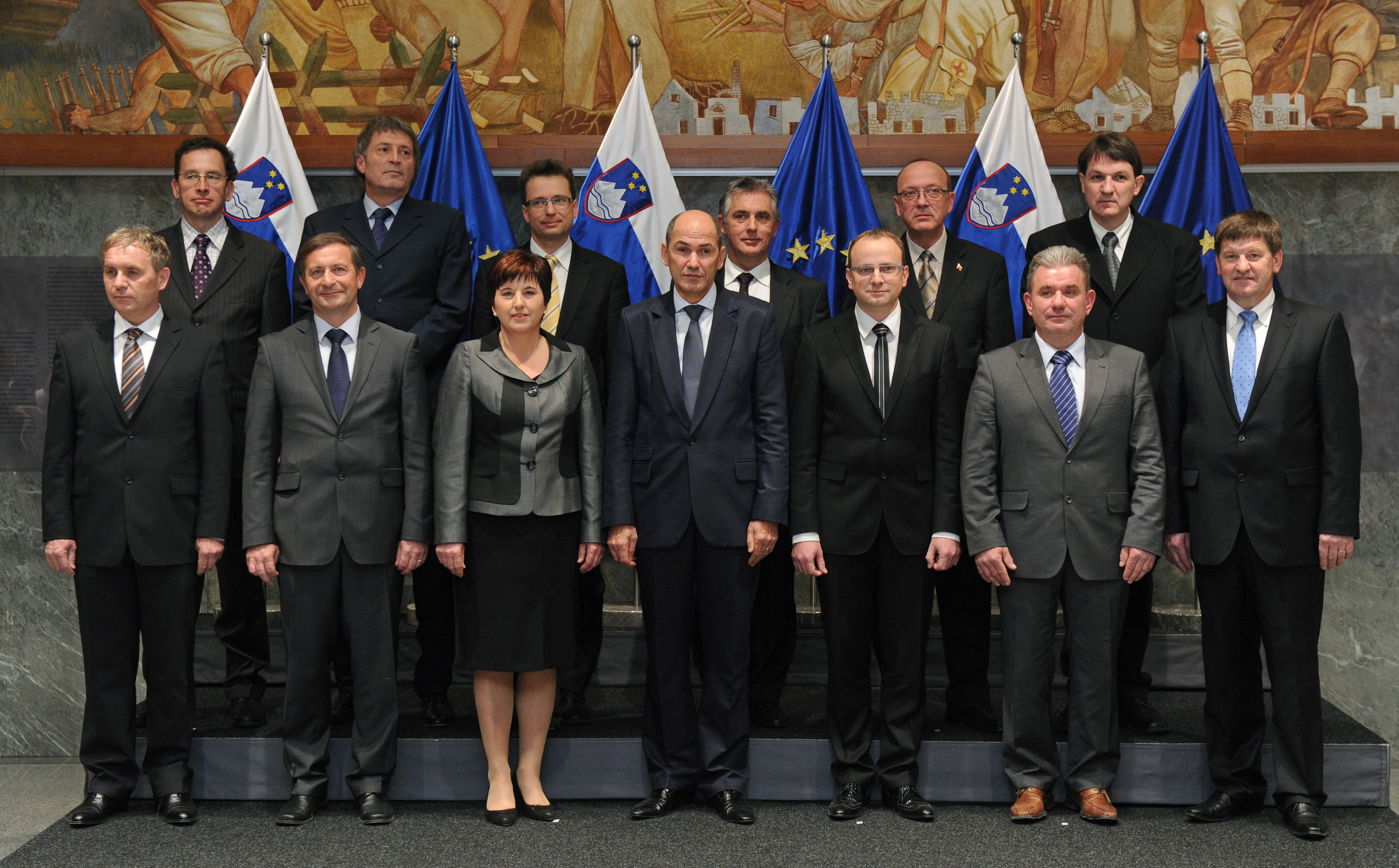
- Date formed: 10 February 2012
- Date dissolved: 20 March 2013

People and organisations
- Head of state: Danilo Türk; Borut Pahor
- Head of government: Janez Janša
- Member party: Slovenian Democratic Party (SDS) Gregor Virant's Civic List (LGV) Democratic Party of Pensioners of Slovenia (DeSUS) Slovenian People's Party (SLS) New Slovenia (NSi)
- Status in legislature: Majority (coalition)
- Opposition party: Positive Slovenia (PS) Social Democrats (SD)
- Opposition leader: Zoran Janković

History
- Election: 2011 Slovenian parliamentary election
- Predecessor: Pahor cabinet
- Successor: Bratušek Cabinet

The 10th Government of Slovenia and the second one of Janez Janša was announced on 10 February 2012. It was formed after the 2011 Slovenian parliamentary election. It was the second government of Janez Janša, and so he became the second premier to return to the position, after Janez Drnovšek, who was prime minister four times.

On 5 January 2012, President Danilo Türk proposed Zoran Janković as the candidate to form a government to the National Assembly. Two days before the scheduled voting, the Slovenian Association of Journalists and Commentators, the second largest journalists' association in the country, issued a statement raising the concern that Janković might abuse his power as prime minister by curtailing the freedom of media through intimidation. A coalition agreement between PS, SD, DL and DeSUS was initialled on 7 January. However, in the evening of 9 January, DL announced it would not support Janković as the new prime minister and also not join his coalition, due to large differences in the programs of the parties. On 11 January, Janković was not elected as the new prime minister by the National Assembly. In a secret ballot, his candidacy only gained the support of 42 deputies, two less than expected prior to the voting, and four short of the absolute majority needed for his election. Following the election of Janez Janša as the Prime Minister in the second round of the voting, Positive Slovenia became an opposition party.

Janša's second government did not finish its mandate. The trouble began when Commission for the Prevention of Corruption of the Republic of Slovenia (KPK) published a report of control of the assets of each president of Slovenian parliamentary parties. Janez Janša and Zoran Janković did not know how to explain the source of all of their assets

Cabinet members came from five parties of the new coalition, until SLS, DL and DeSUS left the coalition on 23 January 2013:

- Slovenian Democratic Party (SDS) - 4 Ministers - 6 Ministers at the end of the term
- New Slovenia (NSi) - 1 Minister + 1 Minister without portfolio
- Gregor Virant's Civic List (DL) - 2 Ministers - Left coalition with resignation of both ministers on 23 January 2013
- Democratic Party of Pensioners of Slovenia (DeSUS) - 2 Ministers - Left coalition on 23 January 2013 but both ministers stayed on positions
- SLS - 2 Ministers - Left coalition on 23 January 2013 but both ministers stayed on positions

== Changes from the preceding cabinet ==
The number of ministries was reduced from 19 in the Pahor cabinet to 12, due to the crisis. It was the fourth government led by the centre-right party.

== List of ministers and portfolios ==
=== Composition at the end of the mandate ===
Minister	Party	Portfolio	Period
Janez Janša	SDS	Prime Minister	10 February 2012 – 20 March 2013
Janez Janša	SDS	Minister of Finance	1 February 2013 – 20 March 2013
Karl Erjavec	DeSUS	Minister of Foreign Affairs	10 February 2012 – 20 March 2013
Radovan Žerjav	SLS	Minister of Economy and Technology	10 February 2012 – 20 March 2013
Aleš Hojs	NSi	Minister of Defence	10 February 2012 – 20 March 2013
Tomaž Gantar	DeSUS	Minister of Health	10 February 2012 – 20 March 2013
Zvonko Černač	SDS	Minister of Infrastructure and Urban Planning	10 February 2012 – 20 March 2013
Zvonko Černač	SDS	Minister of Justice and Public Administration	1 February 2013 – 20 March 2013
Žiga Turk	SDS	Minister of Education, Culture, Science and Sport	10 February 2012 – 20 March 2013
Franc Bogovič	SLS	Minister of Agriculture and Environment	10 February 2012 – 20 March 2013
Andrej Vizjak	SDS	Minister of Social Affairs	10 February 2012 – 20 March 2013
Vinko Gorenak	SDS	Minister of Interior	10 February 2012 – 20 March 2013
Ljudmila Novak	NSi	Minister without portfolio for Slovenian diaspora	10 February 2012 – 20 March 2013
Vlada Republike Slovenije

=== Former members ===
Minister	Party	Portfolio	Period
Janez Šušteršič	DL	Minister of Finance	10 February 2012 – 1 February 2013
Senko Pličanič	DL	Minister of Justice and Public Administration	10 February 2012 – 1 February 2013
Source: Vlada Republike Slovenije

== See also ==
- 2011 Slovenian parliamentary election
- Prime Minister of Slovenia
- Government of Slovenia
- List of governments of Slovenia
- Commission for the Prevention of Corruption of the Republic of Slovenia
