= 11th Government of Slovenia =

Bratušek cabinet
- 11th Cabinet of Slovenia

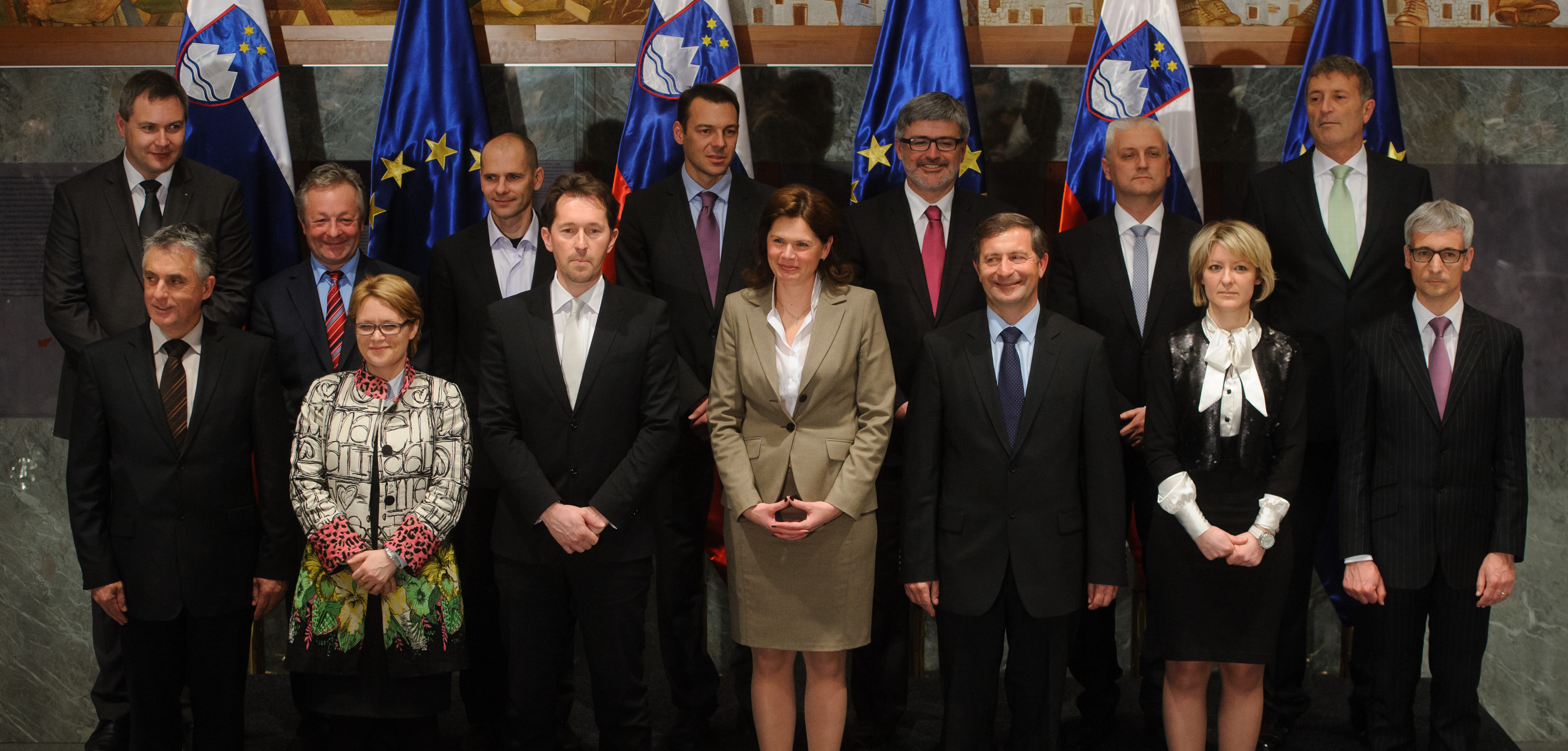
- Date formed: 20 March 2013
- Date dissolved: 18 September 2014

People and organisations
- Head of state: Borut Pahor
- Head of government: Alenka Bratušek
- Member party: Positive Slovenia Social Democrats Gregor Virant's Civic List Democratic Party of Pensioners of Slovenia Party of Alenka Bratušek (since 2014)
- Status in legislature: Majority (coalition)
- Opposition party: Slovenian Democratic Party Slovenian People's Party New Slovenia
- Opposition leader: Janez Janša

History
- Election: None
- Predecessor: Janša II cabinet
- Successor: Cerar Cabinet

The 11th Government of Slovenia led by Prime Minister Alenka Bratušek was announced on 20 March 2013. It was the 11th cabinet of Slovenia. It has been formed after the parliament voted a no confidence vote to Janša's cabinet after SLS, DL and DeSUS left his coalition. On 27 February 2013 Alenka Bratušek was voted as the next mandatary and so became the first woman to do so in modern Slovenian history.

Composition of the new government was quick as it needed to be, as Slovenia was in difficult economic and financial situation that was marked by mass 2012–13 Slovenian protests. Bratušek had most difficulties with finding the new financial minister as nobody was prepared to take responsibility for potential bankruptcy. More than twenty potential candidates have been named until Uroš Čufer finally accepted the position of the new minister. He was confirmed as a minister, even though his candidature was believed to be suspicious as he used to be employed in the biggest national bank NLB, which was in big financial debts. The cabinet of Prime minister Bratušek stabilized the political and economical climate in Slovenia. Her mandate was full of interpellations and increasing number of unemployment and long saga regarding the Ministry of Health and its ministers.

Cabinet members came from four parties of the new coalition, later joined by the fifth party as Alliance of Alenka Bratušek separated from Positive Slovenia:

- Positive Slovenia (PS) – 4 ministers + 1 minister without portfolio – 1 minister at the end of the term
- Social Democrats (SD) – 3 ministers
- Gregor Virant's Civic List (DL) – 3 ministers
- Democratic Party of Pensioners of Slovenia (DeSUS) – 2 ministers
- Alliance of Alenka Bratušek (ZaAB) joined after 31 May 2014 – 4 ministers at the end of the term

== Changes from the preceding cabinet ==
The number of ministries rose to 13, up from 12 in the preceding Cabinet of Janez Janša II. Senko Pličanič has returned to Ministry of Justice, where he was a minister in previous government.

- Ministry of Culture was separated from Ministry of Education, Science, Culture and Sport and once again renewed.
- Ministry of Social Affairs was renamed to Ministry of Labour, Family, Social Affairs and Equal Opportunities.
- Department of Public administration was moved from Ministry of Justice to Ministry of Interior to form new joined Ministry of Interior and Public Administration.
- Many other ministries were renamed.

== List of ministers and portfolios ==
=== History ===
- Igor Maher resigned after five days. He was involved in a media accusation about the legal status of his real estates. Later after resignation all accusations were dismissed as he was able to clarify the status of all his properties. He was replaced by his party colleague Samo Omerzel.
- Minister Stanko Stepišnik backed down as he was involved in a conflict of interest at one of public tender. He was under suspicion of financing his own company. He was substituted with financial minister Uroš Čufer, until Metod Dragonja was named as a new minister.
- Minister of Health Tomaž Gantar surprisingly resigned on 25 November 2013. As he said he resigned, as there is no interest in changing the national health system, which is intertwined with lobbies and corruption. If he was not allowed to reform the system, he was not prepared to take the responsibility for all the patients. Bratušek started looking for a new candidate and was supposedly in contact with known Slovenian surgeon Danijel Bešič Loredan. Later she decided to nominate Alenka Trop Skaza, who was later also confirmed as a new minister. The saga did not end there, as Trop Skaza resigned just one month later. There were many theories why. One was supposedly her husband, as he was an owner of a company which dealt business with many public institutions. She could have resigned for the same reasons as her predecessor: there was no support for the reforms she announced at her inauguration. Her public statement was that she resigned because of "framing, lies, unjust criticism, that her and her family have received because of her position as a minister of health." Bratušek had to find a new minister and was again supposedly in contact with Danijel Bešič Loredan, but in the end she decided to put the burden on her own shoulders and nominated herself as a minister, which she remained until the end of her mandate.
- Tina Komel was forced to step down as Democratic Party of Pensioners of Slovenia lost the Ministry of Health, so Karel Erjavec demanded a new ministry. Ministry without portfolio for Slovenian diaspora, as one of the least important ministries to Bratušek, was given to DeSUS. Komel at first did not want to step down, but after a four-hour-long discussion with the council of Positive Slovenia she finally backed down and prevented a crisis in the coalition."Ministrica Tina Komel vendarle odstopila". Delo. 13 February 2014.

=== Composition at the end of the mandate ===
Minister	Party	Portfolio	Period
Alenka Bratušek	PS	Prime Minister	20 March 2013 – 18 September 2014
Alenka Bratušek	ZaAB	Minister of Health	15 April 2014 – 18 September 2014
Dejan Židan	SD	Minister of Agriculture, Forestry and Food	20 March 2013 – 18 September 2014
Karl Erjavec	DeSUS	Minister of Foreign Affairs	20 March 2013 – 18 September 2014
Gregor Virant	DL	Minister of Interior and Public Administration	20 March 2013 – 18 September 2014
Uroš Čufer	PS	Minister of Finance	20 March 2013 – 18 September 2014
Roman Jakič	PS	Minister of Defence	20 March 2013 – 18 September 2014
Roman Jakič	ZaAB	Minister of Defence	20 March 2013 – 18 September 2014
Metod Dragonja	ZaAB	Minister of Economic Development and Technology	24 February 2014 – 18 September 2014
Senko Pličanič	DL	Minister of Justice	20 March 2013 – 18 September 2014
Jernej Pikalo	SD	Minister of Education, Science and Sport	20 March 2013 – 18 September 2014
Anja Kopač Mrak	SD	Minister of Labour, Family, Social Affairs and Equal Opportunities	20 March 2013 – 18 September 2014
Uroš Grilc	PS	Minister of Culture	20 March 2013 – 18 September 2014
Uroš Grilc	ZaAB	Minister of Culture	20 March 2013 – 18 September 2014
Samo Omerzel	DL	Minister of Infrastructure and Urban Planning	2 April 2013 – 18 September 2014
Gorazd Žmavc	DeSUS	Minister without portfolio for Slovenian diaspora	24 February 2014 – 18 September 2014
Vlada Republike Slovenije

=== Former members ===
Minister	Party	Portfolio	Period
Tomaž Gantar	DeSUS	Minister of Health	20 March 2013 – 29 November 2013
Alenka Trop Skaza	Independent	Minister of Health	29 November 2013 – 3 April 2014
Igor Maher	DL	Minister of Infrastructure and Urban Planning	20 March 2013 – 2 April 2013
Stanko Stepišnik	PS	Minister of Economic Development and Technology	20 March 2013 – 29 November 2013
Tina Komel	PS	Minister without portfolio for Slovenian diaspora	20 March 2013 – 24 February 2014
Source: Vlada Republike Slovenije

== See also ==
- Prime Minister of Slovenia
- Government of Slovenia
- List of governments of Slovenia
