= Marko Pogačnik =

Slovenian artist and author (born 1944)

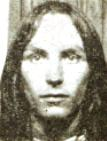
Marko Pogačnik (1969)

Marko Pogačnik (born August 11, 1944) is a Slovenian artist and author.

== Background ==
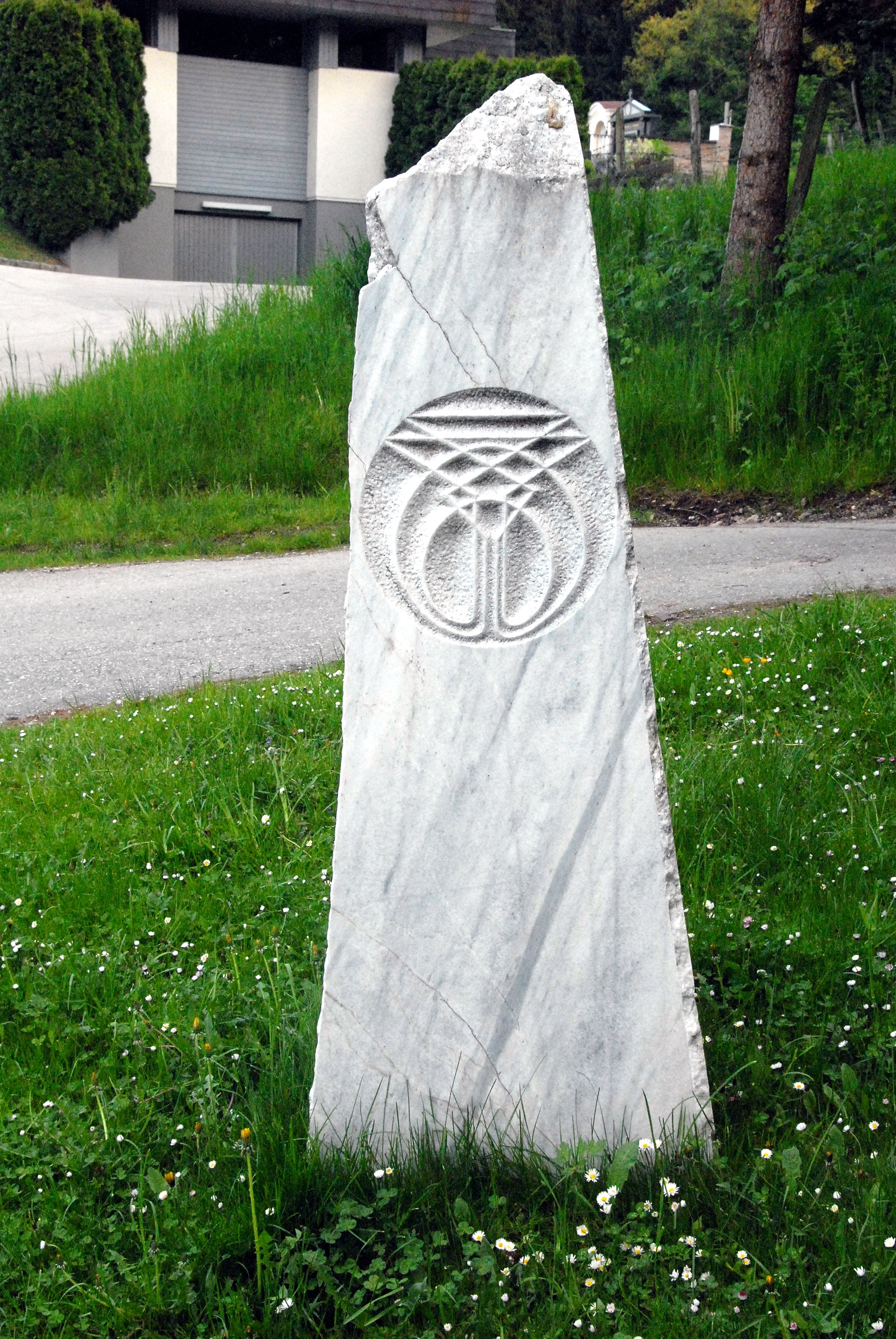
Relief by Pogačnik in Sankt Paul im Lavanttal

Pogačnik studied at the Academy of Arts in Ljubljana, the capital of Slovenia, where he graduated in 1967. He was a co-founder of the neo-avantgarde artistic movement OHO, members of which were also Tomaž Šalamun and Slavoj Žižek. From the 1980s, he embraced a holistic vision of art. He claims to have developed a method of earth healing similar to acupuncture by using pillars and positioning them on so called 'lithopuncture' points of the landscape.

In 1991, he designed the official coat of arms of the newly constituted Republic of Slovenia. In the year 2006, he joined the Movement for Justice and Development led by Janez Drnovšek, the President of Slovenia at the time.

In 1998, together with his daughter Ana, he founded the Lifenet movement, which has been described by scholars as a "typical New Age" group.

He lives and works in the village of Šempas in the lower Vipava Valley. In the last decade, the town of Nova Gorica, in which municipal territory he resides, has commissioned a number of public monuments from Pogačnik, most notably the monument to the 1000 years of the first mention of Gorica and Solkan, which stands in the town's central public square.

Since 2008, a group of his monuments and birch trees, titled the Hologram of Europe (Slovene: Hologram Evrope), stands at the crossroad of Tivoli Street (Tivolska cesta) and Slovene Street (Slovenska cesta) in Ljubljana.

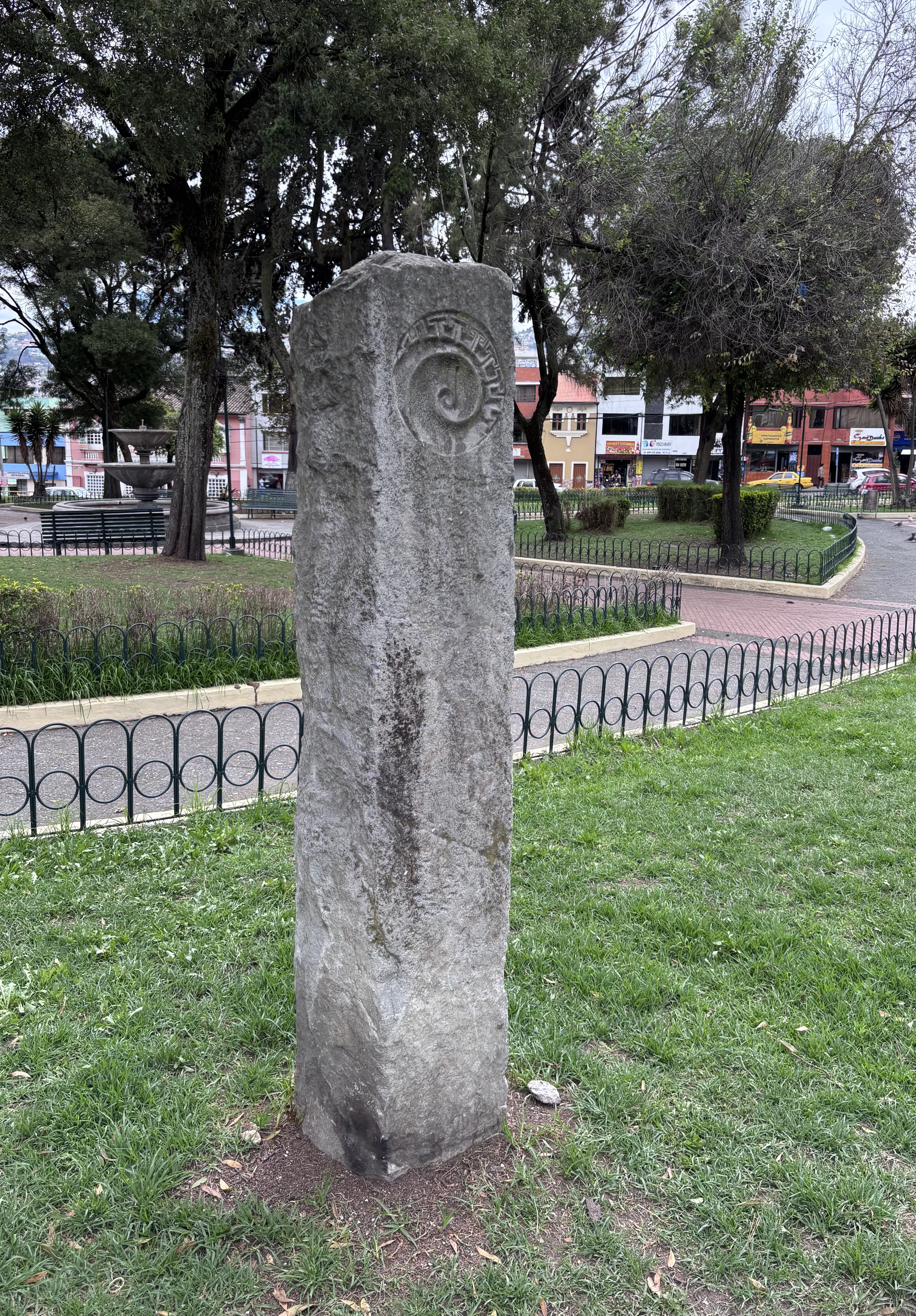
Monolith in the central park of La Magdalena neighbourhood in Quito.

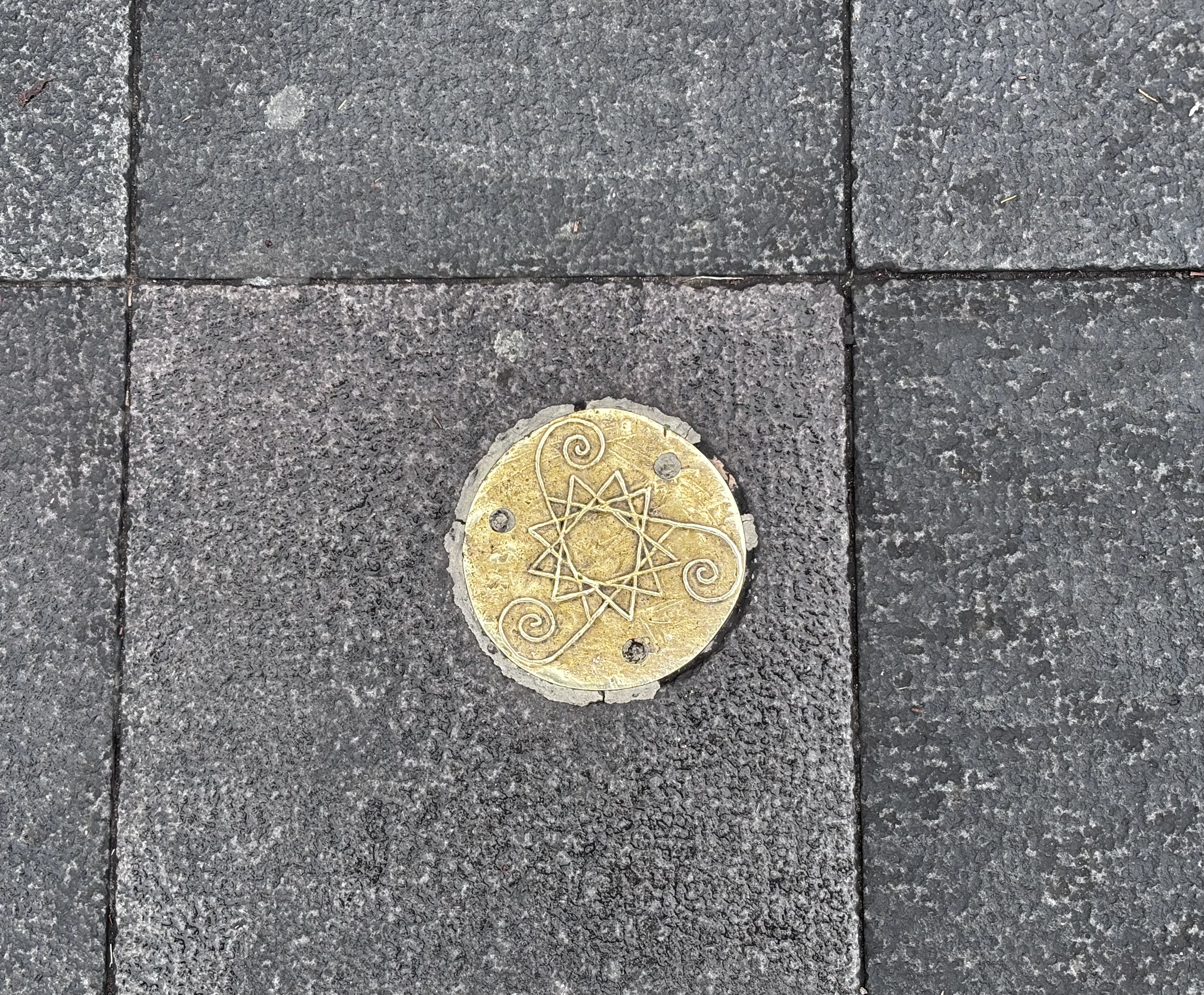
Medallion in the Independence Square of Quito.

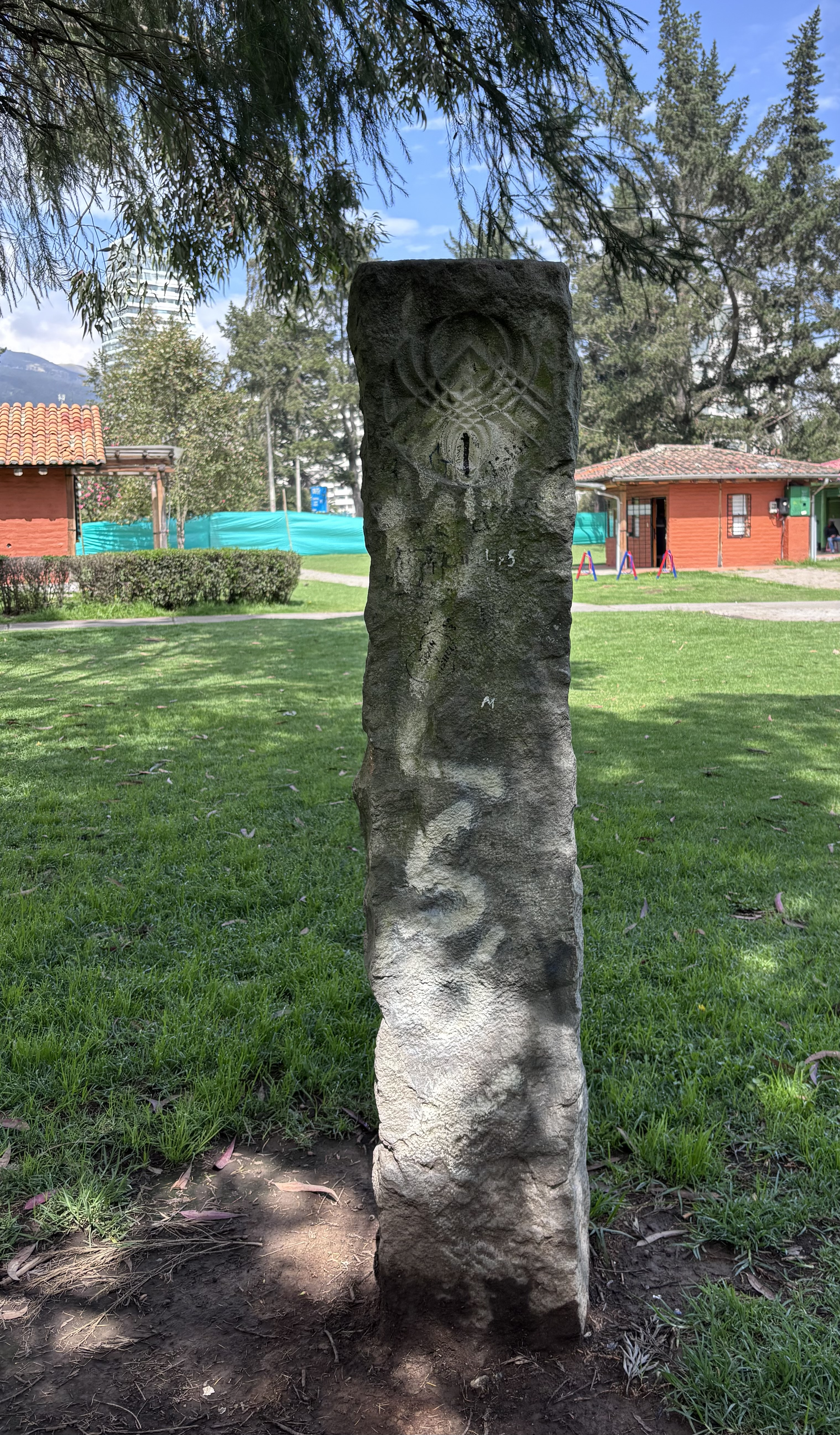
Monolith in La Carolina Park in Quito.

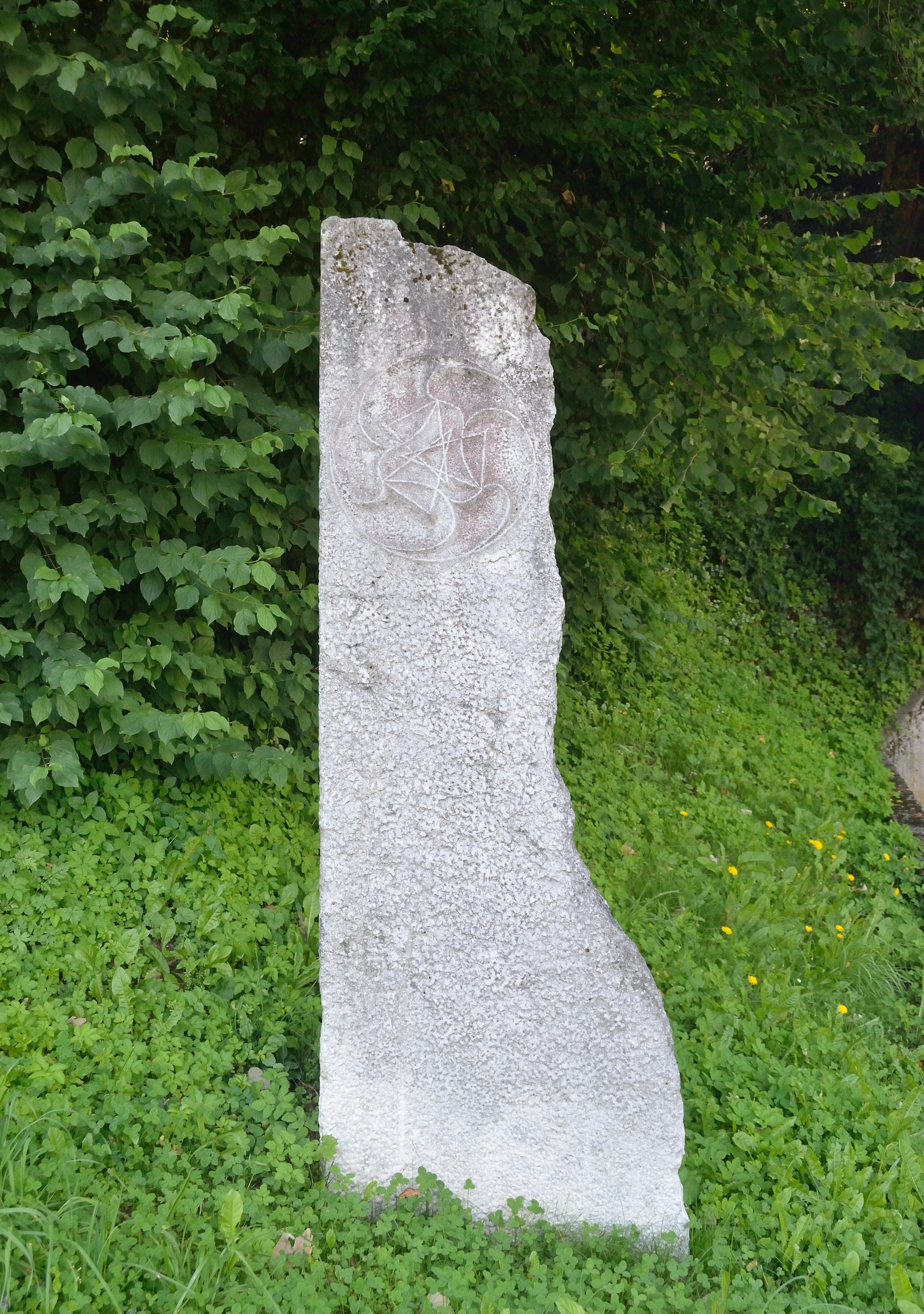
Monolith in Bleiburg (Austria).

== Awards ==
In 1991, Marko Pogačnik received the Prešeren Fund Award for his work. In 2008, he received the Jakopič Award, the central Slovenian fine arts award. He was nominated two times for the Right Livelihood Award.

== Publications ==
- Nature Spirits and Elemental Beings - Working with the Intelligence in Nature (Findhorn Press, Scotland, 1996).
