= Julijana Bizjak Mlakar =

Slovenian politician

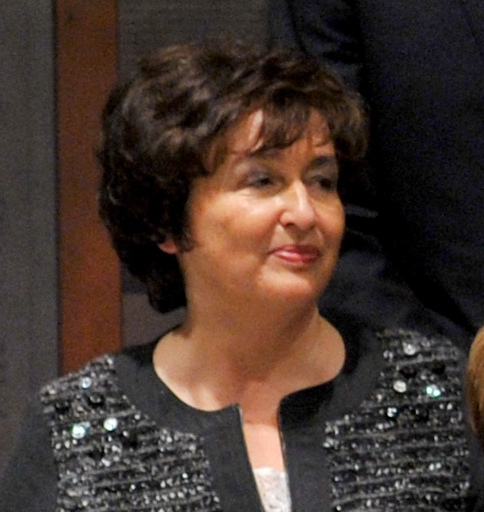
Julijana Bizjak Mlakar in 2014.

Julijana Bizjak Mlakar is a former Slovenian politician. She served as Minister of Culture in the 12th Government of Slovenia from 18 September 2014 to 25 April 2016. Tone Peršak succeeded her as Minister of Culture.
