= Alenka Smerkolj =

Slovenian politician (born 1963)

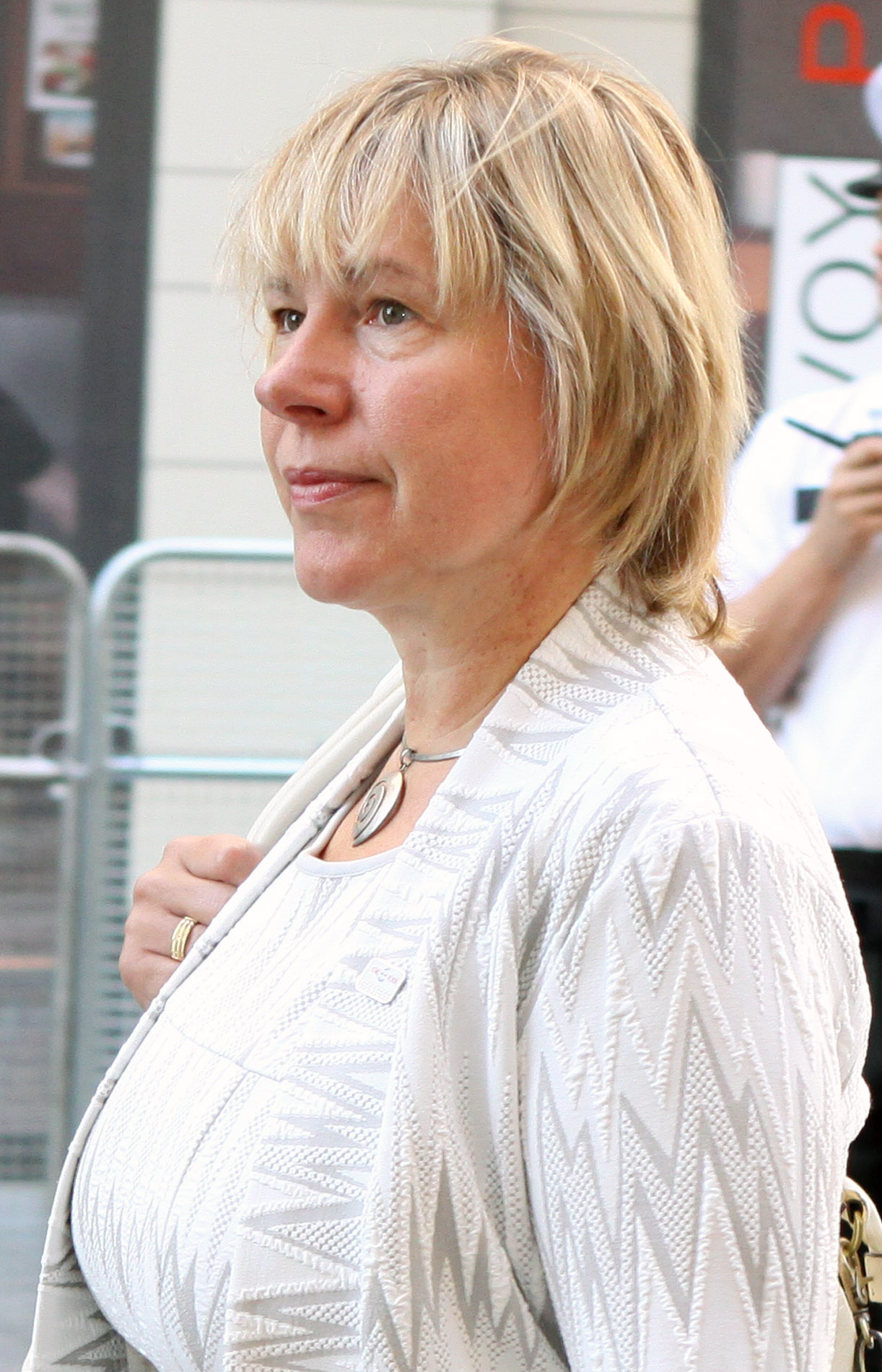
- Smerkolj in 2016

Secretary-General of the Alpine Convention
- Incumbent
- Assumed office 15 July 2019
- Preceded by: Markus Reiterer

Minister of Finance
- In office 13 July 2016 – 21 September 2016
- Prime Minister: Miro Cerar
- Preceded by: Dušan Mramor
- Succeeded by: Mateja Vraničar Erman

Minister without Portfolio responsible for Development, Strategic Projects and Cohesion
- In office 19 November 2014 – 13 September 2018
- President: Borut Pahor
- Prime Minister: Miro Cerar
- Preceded by: Violeta Bulc
- Succeeded by: Marko Bandelli

Personal details
- Born: 15 December 1963 (age 62) Ljubljana, Yugoslavia (now Slovenia)
- Party: Modern Centre Party

Alenka Smerkolj (born 15 December 1963) is a Slovenian politician appointed Secretary-General of the Alpine Convention, starting on 1 July 2019 as first woman holder of this post. From November 2014 to September 2018 she was the Minister without Portfolio responsible for Development, Strategic Projects and Cohesion in Miro Cerar's cabinet. From July to September 2016, she was acting Minister of Finance, after Dušan Mramor resigned.

== Career ==
From 1988 to 2014, Smerkolj worked at the NLB Group, latterly as a director with responsibility for the financial markets. As a director, she was responsible for heading the NLB Group's communications with the Bank of Slovenia and the Ministry of Finance over liquidity management. She also held responsibility for balance sheet management, trade in financial instruments, investment banking, and securities custody. She was also a member of the Treasury Board at the Bank Association of Slovenia (BAS).

Smerkolj is a professor of French and Spanish at the University of Ljubljana.

== Political career ==
On 15 October 2014, Smerkolj was appointed as the State Secretary of the Government Office for Development and European Cohesion Policy. After a one-month tenure, the minister in charge of the department, Violeta Bulc, became the European Commissioner for Transport in the Juncker Commission. The National Assembly, on 19 November 2014, appointed Smerkolj as the replacement Minister without Portfolio responsible for Development, Strategic Projects and Cohesion. Following her appointment, she said: "I truly believe that Slovenian will be successful in developing its vision for development. Together, and through establishing an effective dialogue and cooperation in the search for new ideas and solutions, we will take Slovenia to the next level, i.e. towards balanced, progressive and sustainable development. I believe that this is our common objective and that we should join forces and knowledge in meeting this objective."

Dušan Mramor resigned as Minister of Finance on 13 July 2016; the following day Smerkolj was appointed the acting minister.

Political offices
Preceded by Dušan Mramor	Minister of Finance; Acting; 2016	Succeeded by Mateja Vraničar Erman
