= Movement for Justice and Development (Slovenia) =

Slovenian voluntary association

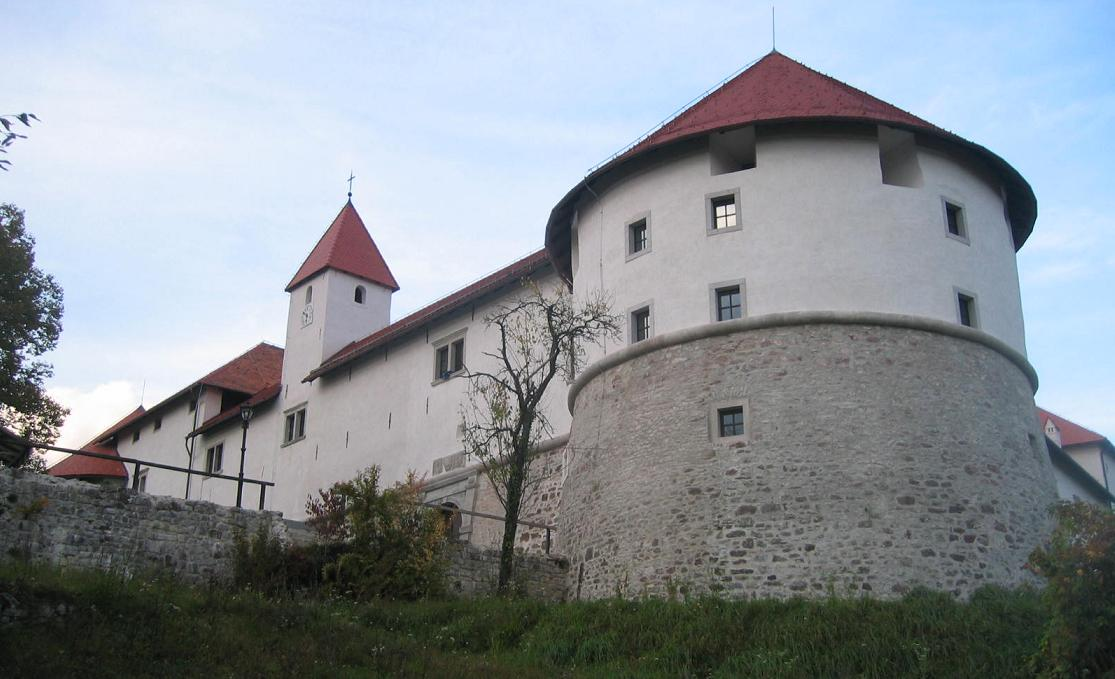
Turjak castle in Lower Carniola, where the Movement was officially founded in 2006

The Movement for Justice and Development (Slovene: Gibanje za pravičnost in razvoj) is a Slovenian voluntary association founded in 2006 by the then president of Slovenia, Janez Drnovšek.

Despite having been founded by the president of Slovenia during his time in office, it is not a political movement in the strict sense of the term. Nevertheless, there were some speculation that it would eventually turn into a political party or a platform for the re-election of Drnovšek, who had previously left his original party, the Liberal Democracy of Slovenia. These speculations turned to be wrong. The Movement did however serve as the president's personal platform during the last years of his presidency, especially in rallying public support during his conflict with Prime Minister Janez Janša in 2007. After Drnovšek left active political life, the Movement lost much of its initial momentum, as well as the prominence in the media.

According to its program, it is primarily aimed at "raising human consciousness and making the world a better place". The movement was founded in a mass rally in the Turjak castle in Lower Carniola, to which several important Slovenian political figures attended, mostly from the left-wing and liberal political spectrum.

Between 2006 and 2007, the movement's website used to draw attention from the media, because Drnovšek occasionally used it to post his critical comments on current political events, such as proposed building of a big casino center in Goriška region, or commenting the work of Janša's government, using the signature as Janez D.

== See also ==
- Marko Pogačnik
