= Dušan Mramor =

Slovenian economist and politician

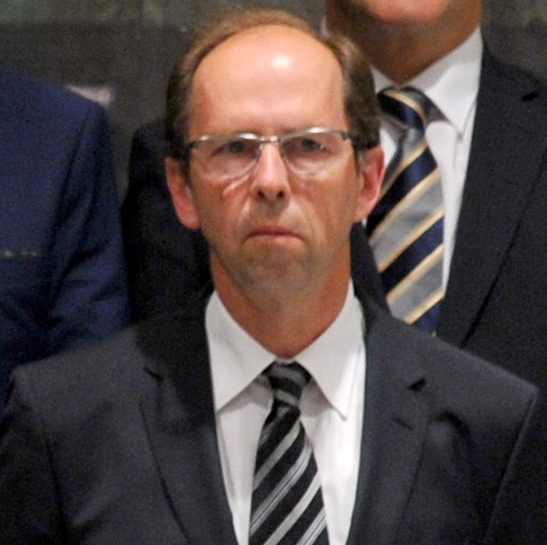

Minister of Finance
- In office 18 September 2014 – 13 July 2016
- Prime Minister: Miro Cerar
- Preceded by: Uroš Čufer
- Succeeded by: Alenka Smerkolj (Acting)
- In office 11 December 2002 – 9 November 2004
- Prime Minister: Anton Rop
- Preceded by: Zvone Ivanušič
- Succeeded by: Andrej Bajuk

Personal details
- Born: 1 November 1953 (age 72) Ljubljana, PR Slovenia, Yugoslavia
- Party: Independent
- Spouse: Neža Mramor Kosta
- Education: University of Ljubljana

Dušan Mramor (born 1 November 1953) is a Slovenian politician. He twice served as the Minister of Finance of Slovenia, in office 2002–2004 and 2014–2016.

Before serving as finance minister, he was a full professor of finance at the Faculty of Economics, University of Ljubljana. He served as the Dean of the Faculty of Economics (2007–2013), as Chairman of the Board of the University of Ljubljana (2000–2002 and 2009–2013), and as Associate Dean of the Faculty of Economics (1997–2001).

He was a recurring visiting professor at the Central European University, and a research associate and visiting scholar at the School of Business, Indiana University, in the United States. Mramor has already served as the finance minister of Slovenia from 2002–2004 (government Anton Rop).

Currently (2014) he is a Vice-President of the board of the European Institute for Advanced Studies in Management (EIASM), Belgium, a member of the International Advisory Board of Maastricht University School of Business and Economics, Netherlands and was until August 2014 a member of the Initial Accreditation Committee and European Advisory Committee of AACSB, USA.

The magazine The Banker, of the Financial Times Group in London, selected Slovenian Minister of Finance Dušan Mramor as European Finance Minister of the Year 2016.

Political offices
Preceded by Anton Rop	Minister of Finance; 2002–2004	Succeeded by Andrej Bajuk
Preceded by Uroš Čufer	Minister of Finance; 2014–2016	Succeeded by Alenka Smerkolj; Acting
