= Mateja Vraničar Erman =

Slovenian politician (born 1965)

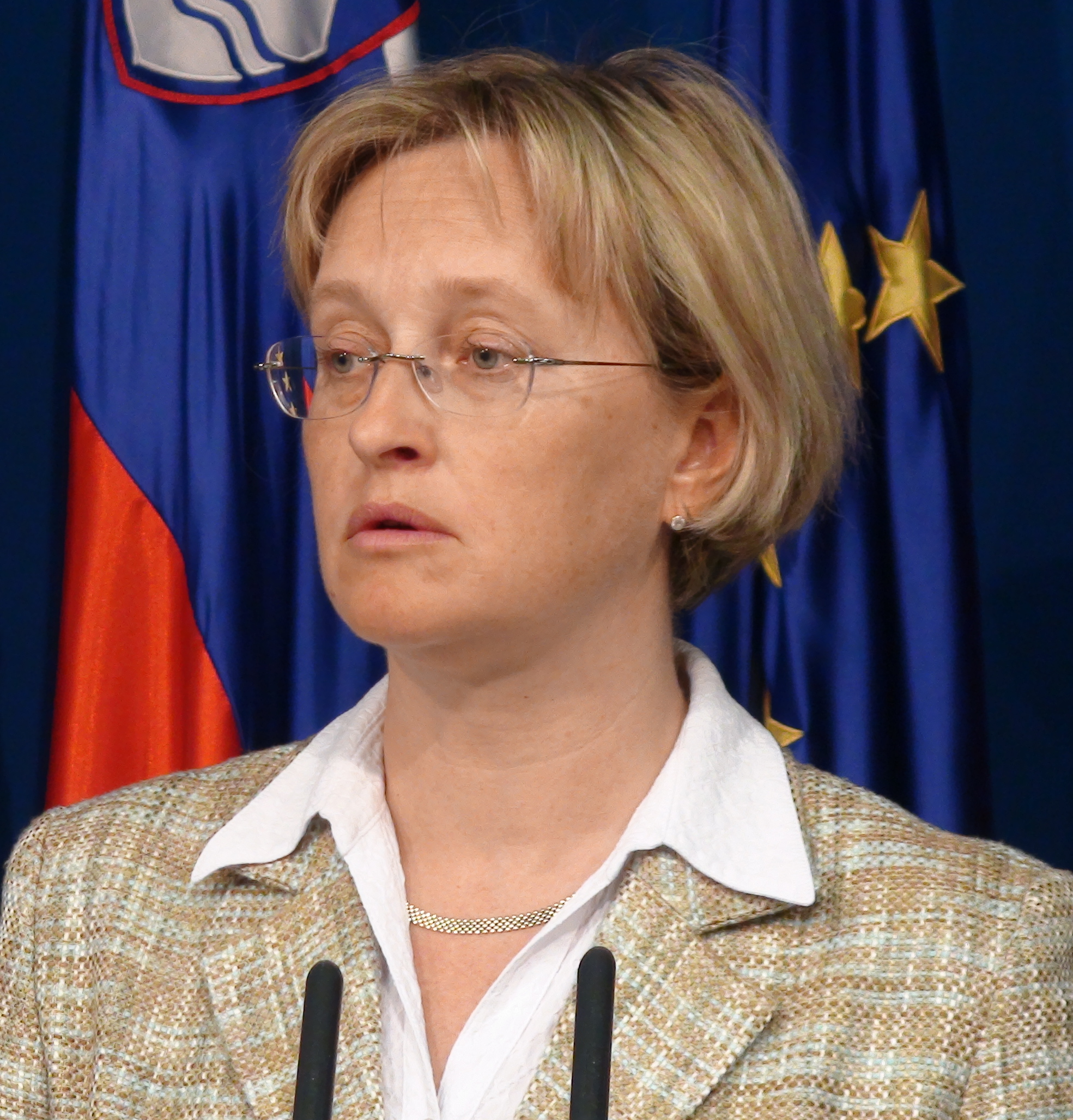

Minister of Finance
- In office 21 September 2016 – 13 September 2018
- Prime Minister: Miro Cerar
- Preceded by: Alenka Smerkolj (Acting)
- Succeeded by: Andrej Bertoncelj

Personal details
- Born: 7 November 1965 (age 60) Ljubljana, Yugoslavia
- Party: Independent
- Education: University of Ljubljana; Harvard University

Mateja Vraničar Erman (born 7 November 1965 in Ljubljana) is a Slovenian administrator who served as the Minister of Finance in the government of Prime Minister Miro Cerar from 2016 until 2018.

== Education ==
Vraničar Erman has a Master’s of Public Administration from the John F. Kennedy School of Government at Harvard University. She also holds a degree from the Faculty of Law of the University of Ljubljana.

== Career ==
A legal expert, Vraničar Erman served at the Ministry of Foreign Affairs from 1989 to 1993.

Vraničar Erman has worked at the finance ministry since 1993. She served as State Secretary from April 2010 to February 2012.

On 21 September 2016, the Slovenian Parliament voted 50-21 to confirm Vraničar Erman as the country’s first female finance minister, succeeding Dušan Mramor. She is not politically affiliated but was proposed by Prime Minister of Slovenia Miro Cerar’s Modern Centre Party.

== Other activities ==
- European Bank for Reconstruction and Development (EBRD), Ex-Officio Member of the Board of Governors (2016–2018)
- European Investment Bank (EIB), Ex-Officio Member of the Board of Governors (2016–2018)
- European Stability Mechanism (ESM), Member of the Board of Governors (2016–2018)
- Multilateral Investment Guarantee Agency (MIGA), World Bank Group, Ex-Officio Member of the Board of Governors (2016–2018)
- World Bank, Ex-Officio Member of the Board of Governors (2016–2018)

Political offices
Preceded by Alenka Smerkolj; Acting	Minister of Finance; 2016–2018	Succeeded by Andrej Bertoncelj
