= Dušan Šešok =

Slovenian politician

Secretary of Finance
- In office 9 May 1991 – 14 May 1992
- Preceded by: Marko Kranjec
- Succeeded by: Janez Kopač

Dušan Šešok is a former Slovenian politician. He served as the country's second Minister of Finance (formally as 'Secretary of Finance') from 9 May 1991 to 14 May 1992.

Political offices
Preceded by Marko Kranjec	Secretary of Finance; 1991–1992	Succeeded by Janez Kopač
