= Marko Kranjec =

Slovenian politician

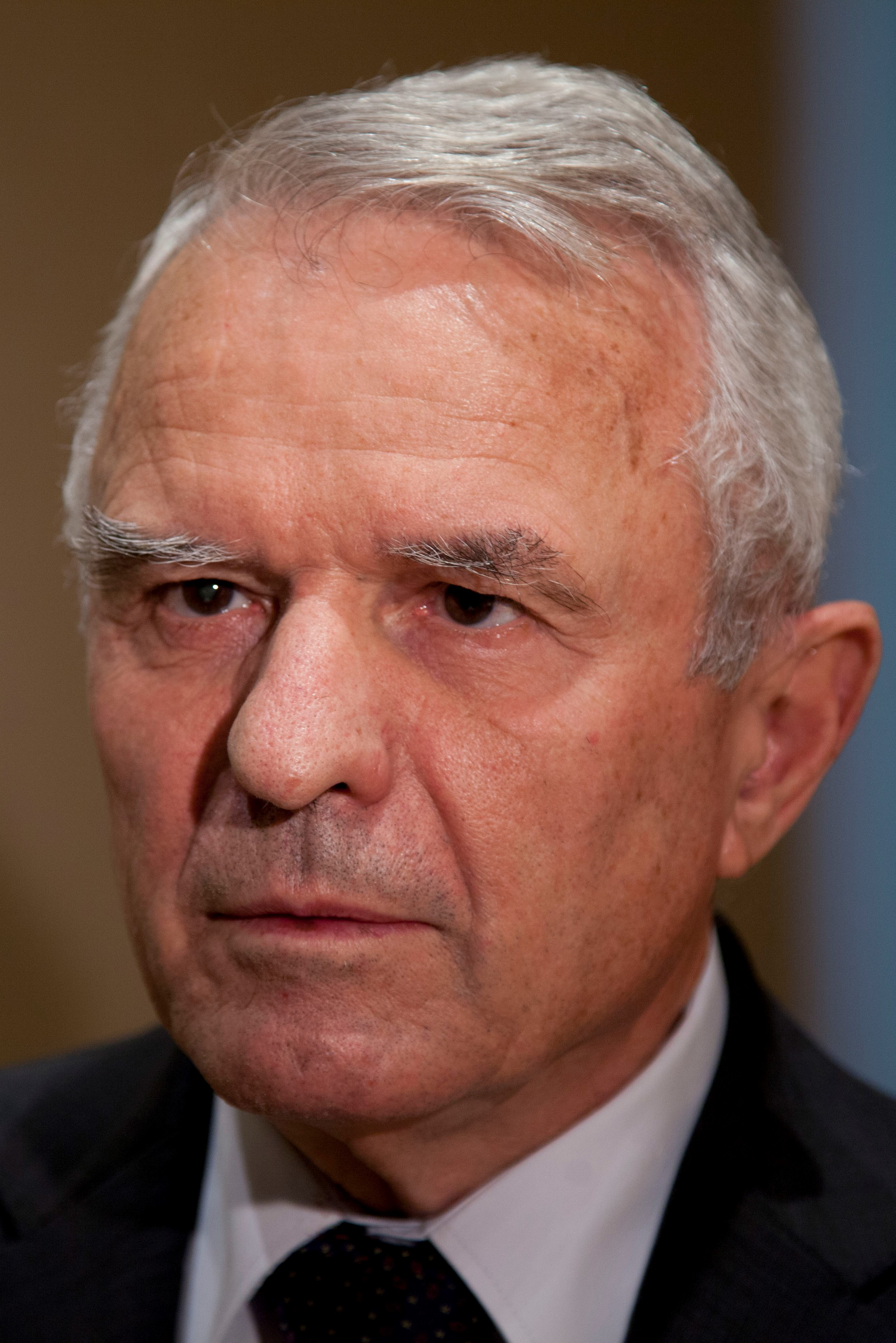

Secretary of Finance
- In office 16 May 1990 – 8 May 1991
- Preceded by: Office established
- Succeeded by: Dušan Šešok

Marko Kranjec is a former Slovenian politician. He served as the country's first Minister of Finance (formally as 'Secretary of Finance') from 16 May 1990 to 8 May 1991.

In 2007, he became governor of the Bank of Slovenia. He served in this role for six years and Boštjan Jazbec was appointed as his successor.

Political offices
New office	Secretary of Finance; 1990–1991	Succeeded by Dušan Šešok
