= Violeta Bulc =

Slovenian politician (born 1964)

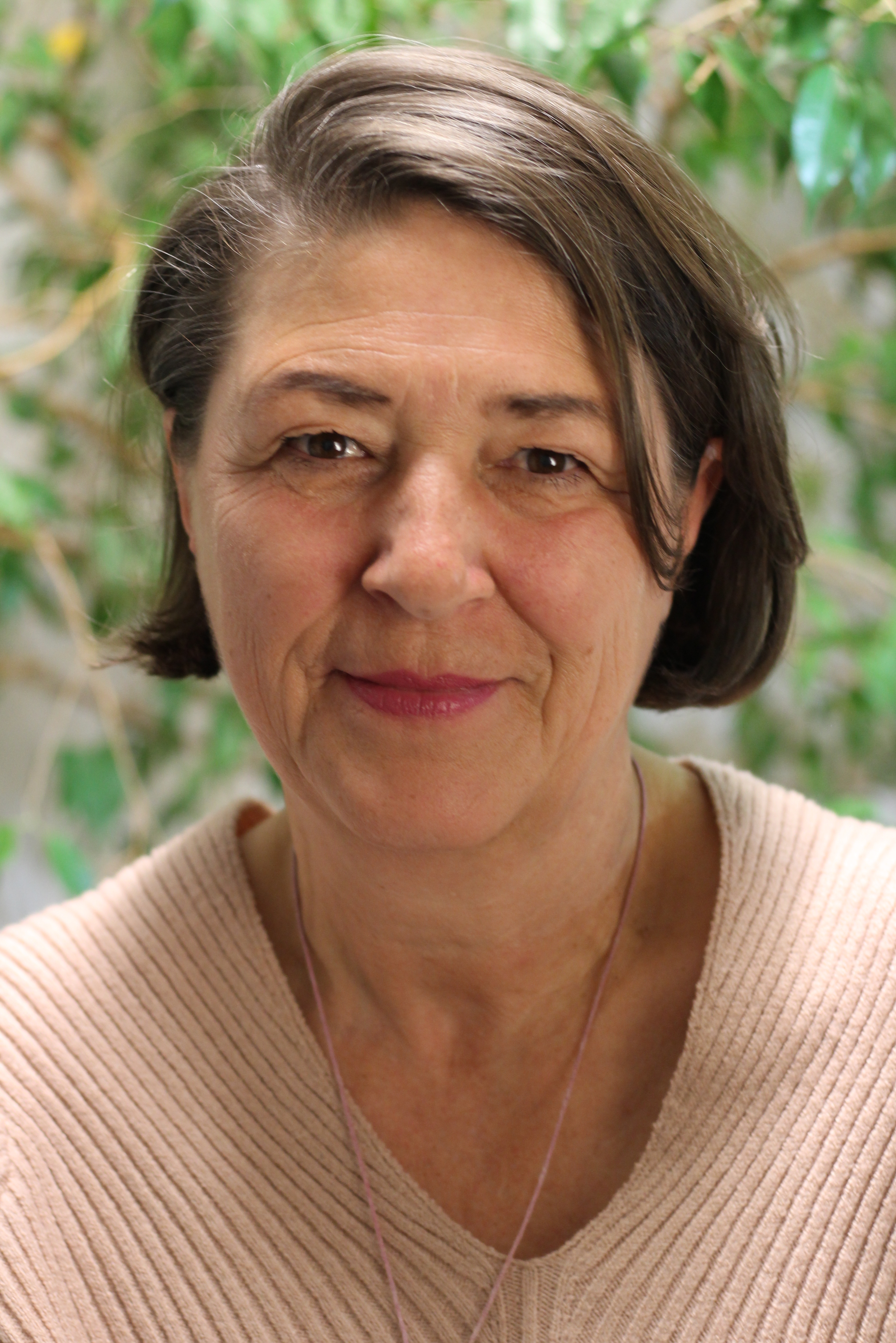
- Bulc in 2022

European Commissioner for Transport
- In office 1 November 2014 – 1 December 2019
- Commission: Juncker
- Preceded by: Siim Kallas
- Succeeded by: Adina-Ioana Vălean

Deputy Prime Minister of Slovenia
- In office 19 September 2014 – 1 November 2014
- Prime Minister: Miro Cerar
- Preceded by: Goran Manns
- Succeeded by: Alenka Smerkolj

Personal details
- Born: 24 January 1964 (age 62) Ljubljana, Yugoslavia (now Slovenia)
- Party: Our Future
- Education: University of Ljubljana; Golden Gate University

Violeta Bulc (born 24 January 1964) is a Slovenian politician who served as the European Commissioner for Transport from 2014 to 2019.

== Early life ==
Bulc earned a bachelor's degree in computer science and informatics at the Faculty of Electrical Engineering, University of Ljubljana, Slovenia, as well as a master's degree in information technology at the Golden Gate University of San Francisco. She then worked from 1991 to 1994 as an expert for wide area networks performance analyses at DHL in Burlingame, California. In 1994, she returned to Slovenia, where she worked as the manager of institutional traffic (until 1997) and then the director of carrier business (until 1999) for Telekom Slovenia. From 1999 to 2000 she was the vice-president of Telemach, a major telecommunications provider, and from 2000 to 2014 the CEO of Vibacom, Sustainable Strategies and Innovation Ecosystems.

== Political career ==
Bulc joined Slovenian politics together with Miro Cerar in 2013, and she was appointed head of the program committee of the Miro Cerar Party.

Bulc served as a minister without portfolio responsible for development, strategic projects and cohesion and as deputy prime minister from 19 September 2014 until 1 November 2014 in the centre-left cabinet of Miro Cerar.

Led by Margrethe Vestager, Bulc was among the seven-strong "Team Europe" that the centrist Alliance of Liberals and Democrats for Europe Party picked to spearhead its pro-EU, liberal campaign ahead of the 2019 European elections.

== Other activities ==
In 2022, Bulc became a board member of the Joint European Disruptive Initiative.

== Critique over esotericism ==
On 10 October 2014, the Slovenian government announced that Bulc would be Slovenia's nominee for the position of the European Commissioner on the Juncker Commission, replacing Alenka Bratušek. Bulc was criticized because of her esoteric views. After a confirmation hearing in front of the European Parliament's Committee on Transport and Tourism, Bulc was assigned the transport portfolio.

Political offices
Preceded by Janez Potočnik	Slovenian European Commissioner; 2014–2019	Succeeded by Janez Lenarčič
Preceded by Siim Kallas	European Commissioner for Transport; 2014–2019	Succeeded by Adina-Ioana Vălean
