= Jožica Puhar =

Slovene politician (1942–2024)

Minister of Labour, Family, and Social Affairs
- In office 16 May 1990 – 21 June 1994

Personal details
- Born: 19 March 1942 Krainburg, German-occupied Slovenia
- Died: 15 January 2024 (aged 81)
- Education: University of Ljubljana
- Occupation: Sociologist

Jožica Puhar (19 March 1942 – 15 January 2024) was a Slovenian sociologist and politician. She served as Minister of Labour, Family, and Social Affairs from 1990 to 1994.

Puhar died in January 2024, at the age of 81.
