= Neža Mramor Kosta =

Slovenian mathematician

Nežka Mramor Kosta
- Born: Neža Kosta
- Scientific career
- Fields: Mathematics, Computer Science
- Workplaces: University of Ljubljana

Neža Mramor Kosta, also known as Nežka Mramor Kosta, is a Slovenian mathematician retired as a professor of computer and information science at the University of Ljubljana. She works in computational logic. She is an alumna of Indiana University Bloomington.

== Selected publications ==
- Neža Mramor Kosta, Mehmetcik Pamuk, Hanife Varli, Perfect discrete Morse functions on connected sums, arXiv:1501.06200
- Henry King, Kevin Knudson, Neža Mramor, Birth and death in discrete Morse theory, arXiv:0808.0051
- Borut Jurčič Zlobec, Neža Mramor Kosta, Geometric constructions on cycles in R'n, arXiv:1311.5656
- AYALA, Rafael, VILCHES, Jose Antonio, JERŠE, Gregor, MRAMOR KOSTA, Neža. Discrete gradient fields on infinite complexes. Discrete and continuous dynamical systems
- JERŠE, Gregor, MRAMOR KOSTA, Neža. Ascending and descending regions of a discrete Morse function. Computational geometry
- MRAMOR KOSTA, Neža, TRENKLEROVÁ, Eva. Basic sets in the digital plane. Lecture notes in computer science, ISSN 0302-9743, 4910, 2008, str. 376–387.
- JAWOROWSKI, Jan, MRAMOR KOSTA, Neža. The degree of maps of free G-manifolds. Journal of fixed point theory and its applications, ISSN 1661-7738, 2007, vol. 2, no. 2, str. 209–213.
- KING, Henry C., KNUDSON, Kevin, MRAMOR KOSTA, Neža. Generating discrete Morse functions from point data. Experimental mathematics, ISSN 1058-6458, 2005, vol. 14, no. 4, str. 435–444.
- JURČIČ-ZLOBEC, Borut, MRAMOR KOSTA, Neža. Geometric constructions on cycles. Rocky Mountain journal of mathematics.
- CENCELJ, Matija, MRAMOR KOSTA, Neža, VAVPETIČ, Aleš. G-complexes with a compatible CW structure. Journal of mathematics of Kyoto University.
