= Anton Rop =

Prime Minister of Slovenia from 2002 to 2004

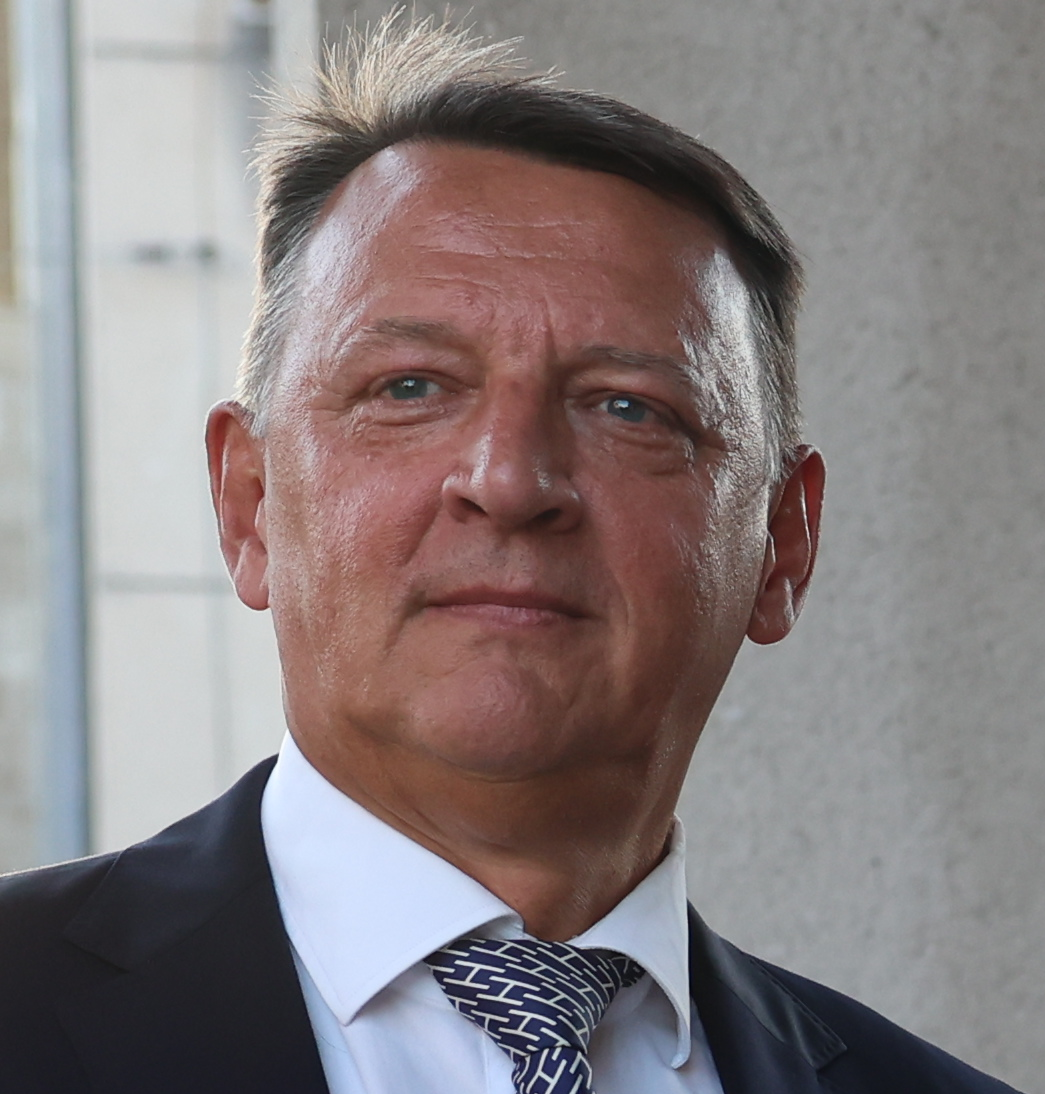

Prime Minister of Slovenia
- In office 19 December 2002 – 3 December 2004
- President: Milan Kučan; Janez Drnovšek
- Preceded by: Janez Drnovšek
- Succeeded by: Janez Janša

Personal details
- Born: 27 December 1960 (age 65) Ljubljana, PR Slovenia, Yugoslavia
- Party: Liberal Democracy (before 2007); Social Democrats (2007–present)
- Education: University of Ljubljana

Anton Rop (born 27 December 1960) is a Slovenian politician. He was Prime Minister of Slovenia, from 2002 to 2004. Until 2005 he was also the president of the Liberal Democratic Party (Liberalna Demokracija Slovenije – LDS), the legal successor of the Slovenian Association of Socialist Youth. On 20 March 2007 he left the party and joined the Social Democrats. In 2010, he was appointed a vice-president of the European Investment Bank.

Rop was born in Ljubljana. He graduated from the Faculty of Economics in Ljubljana in 1984. In 1991, he was admitted to the master's degree in economics, with a thesis on state expenditure and economic growth. From 1985 to 1992 he was Assistant Director of the Slovenian Institute for Macroeconomic Analysis and Development, where he also headed working groups for the projects of fiscal informatics and investments in economic infrastructure and tackled Slovenia's developmental problems. He has written numerous articles about investment, market and housing topics. In his capacity as assistant director of the Institute and advisor to the government he started working in the field of privatisation and legislation drafting as early as 1992.

In 1993 he was appointed State Secretary at the Ministry of Economic Relations and Development, charged with privatisation and regional development. Between 1996 and 2000 he held the office of Minister of Labour, Family and Social Affairs.

Following elections to the National Assembly at the end of 2000 he was appointed Minister of Finance. He performed this function until December 19, 2002 when he was elected prime minister. He came into conflict with President Janez Drnovšek, though they are from the same party. His government lost the October 2004 elections, and he relinquished the post of Prime Minister on November 9, 2004 when Janez Janša was elected.

He was member of National Assembly of Slovenia until August 2010, when he became vice-president of the European Investment Bank.

In 2026, he announced his candidacy for mayor of Ljubljana in the local elections.

Political offices
Preceded by Rina Klinar	Minister of Labour, Family and Social Affairs; 1996–2000	Succeeded by Miha Brejc
Preceded by Zvonko Ivanušič	Minister of Finance; 2000–2002	Succeeded by Dušan Mramor
Preceded by Janez Drnovšek	Prime Minister of Slovenia; 2002–2004	Succeeded by Janez Janša
Party political offices
Preceded by Janez Drnovšek	President of Liberal Democracy; 2002–2005	Succeeded by Jelko Kacin
