= Andrej Bajuk =

Prime Minister of Slovenia in 2000

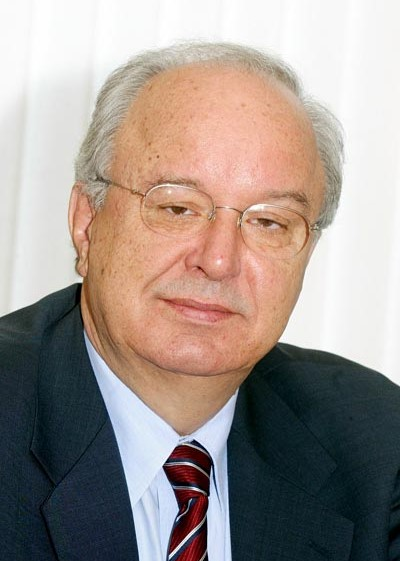
- Bajuk in 2005

Prime Minister of Slovenia
- In office 7 June 2000 – 30 November 2000
- President: Milan Kučan
- Preceded by: Janez Drnovšek
- Succeeded by: Janez Drnovšek

Minister of Finance
- In office 3 December 2004 – 21 November 2008
- Prime Minister: Janez Janša
- Preceded by: Dušan Mramor
- Succeeded by: Franc Križanič

Personal details
- Born: 18 October 1943 Ljubljana, Operational Zone of the Adriatic Littoral, Nazi Germany (now Slovenia)
- Died: 16 August 2011 (aged 67) Ljubljana, Slovenia
- Party: New Slovenia

Andrej Bajuk (18 October 1943 – 16 August 2011) was a Slovenian politician and economist. He served briefly as Prime Minister of Slovenia in the year 2000, and was Minister of Finance in the centre-right government of Janez Janša between 2004 and 2008. He was the founder and first president of the Christian Democratic party called New Slovenia.

== Life in exile ==
Bajuk was born in a Slovene intellectual family in Nazi-occupied Ljubljana. His father Bozidar Bajuk was a classical philologist, and his grandfather Marko Bajuk was the principal of the Bežigrad Grammar School, one of the most prestigious secondary schools in Ljubljana. The Bajuks were acquainted with the famous poet Edvard Kocbek who lived in the same building.

The family left Slovenia in early May 1945, when the Communists took power in Yugoslavia. They spent nearly three years in refugee camps in Lower and Upper Austria before leaving to Argentina with the help of the Slovene refugee relief network set by Ivan Ahčin and Miha Krek. They settled in Mendoza, where Bajuk grew up, studied and started a family.

He received his first degree in economics at Universidad Nacional de Cuyo. He received his first master's degree in a two-year international study program organised by the University of Chicago, receiving the second jointly with his PhD from the University of California, Berkeley. He returned to Mendoza, where he taught as a professor at the university. After the military coup in 1976 he was fired and soon left for Washington, D.C., working for the World Bank for a year. He then switched to the Inter-American Development Bank (IDB), where he stayed for a number of years. He held a range of positions at the IDB, from economist in charge of analysing social projects to adviser to the executive vice-president. For his last six years in Washington he was in charge of the office of the Presidency of the bank and a member of the board of executive directors of the bank. From September 1994 he was IDB representative for Europe in Paris.

== Return to Slovenia ==
From the second half of 1999, Bajuk spent a considerable amount of time in Slovenia. Following the coalition agreement between the Slovenian Christian Democrats and the Social Democratic Party of Slovenia, he assumed leadership of the expert council developing the coalition's alternative government programme. At the unification congress of the SKD and Slovene People's Party, he was elected deputy president of the unified party.

After the fall of Janez Drnovšek's centre-left government, Andrej Bajuk became the prime minister on 3 May 2000, and led the government until 16 November 2000. In July 2000, the newly merged SLS+SKD – Slovenian People's Party – contrary to previously agreed policy and government stance – voted in favour of an electoral system based on proportional representation. This led Prime Minister Bajuk to leave the Slovene People's Party. In August 2000, he and his supporters founded a new political party called New Slovenia (Nova Slovenija, N.Si).

In the elections of 2000, he was elected to the National Assembly, but Janez Drnovšek returned to power as prime minister. Bajuk’s party stayed in the opposition and formed a shadow cabinet jointly with Janez Janša's Social Democratic Party of Slovenia.

In the 2004 national elections, he was again elected to the Slovenian parliament. He did not stay an MP for long, as he soon took on the role of the Minister of Finance in the newly elected government, led by Janez Janša. For his actions and work during his time in office, he was declared (the) "finance minister of the year in Europe" by the Financial Times Business magazine, "The Banker" in 2005.

In the parliamentary elections of 2008, the "New Slovenia" party suffered a severe defeat and did not secure the entry in the Slovenian National Assembly. Bajuk resigned as president of the party and was replaced by Ljudmila Novak. At that time, he completely retired from public life.

He was fluent in Slovene, Spanish, English and French. Bajuk was the father-in-law of the Slovenian diplomat and essayist Igor Senčar.

Bajuk died of a stroke on 16 August 2011.

Political offices
Preceded by Janez Drnovšek	Prime Minister of Slovenia; May 3, 2000 – November 17, 2000	Succeeded by Janez Drnovšek
Preceded by Dušan Mramor	Minister of Finance; November 9, 2004 – November 21, 2008	Succeeded by Franci Križanič
Party political offices
Preceded by office established	President of New Slovenia; 2000–2008	Succeeded by Ljudmila Novak
