= Minister of Finance (Slovenia) =

This is a list of ministers of finance of Slovenia since 1990:

Image	Minister	Term	Notes
	Marko Kranjec	1990-1991	
	Dušan Šešok	1991-1992	
	Janez Kopač	1992	
	Mitja Gaspari	1992-2000	
	Zvonko Ivanušič	2000	
	Anton Rop	2000-2002	
	Dušan Mramor	2002-2004	
	Andrej Bajuk	2004-2008	
	Franc Križanič	2008-2012	
	Janez Šušteršič	2012-2013	
	Janez Janša	2013	
	Uroš Čufer	2013-2014	
	Dušan Mramor	2014-2016	
	Mateja Vraničar Erman	2016-2018	
	Andrej Bertoncelj	2018-2020	
	Andrej Šircelj	2020-2022	
	Klemen Boštjančič	2022-2026	
	Andrej Šircelj	2026-	

== See also ==
- Economy of Slovenia
