= Janez Drnovšek =

Slovenian statesman (1958–2008)

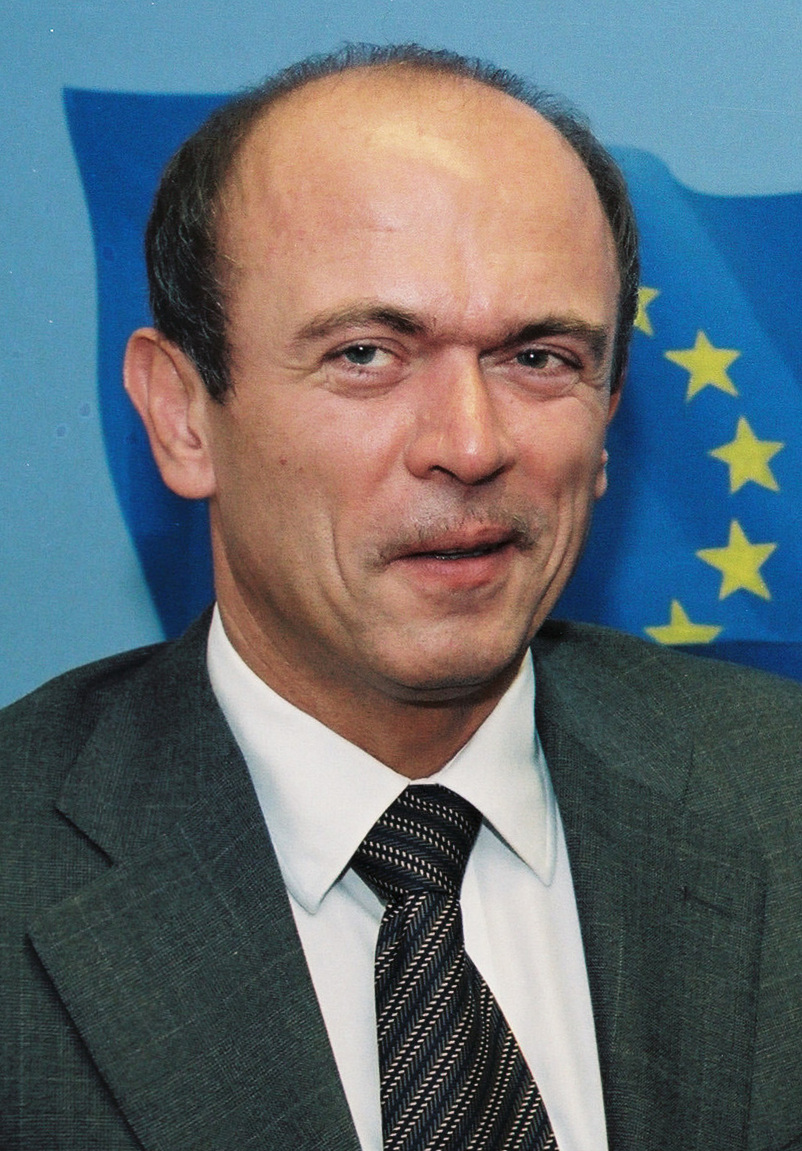
- Drnovšek in 1996

President of Slovenia
- In office 22 December 2002 – 23 December 2007
- Prime Minister: Anton Rop; Janez Janša
- Preceded by: Milan Kučan
- Succeeded by: Danilo Türk

Prime Minister of Slovenia
- In office 30 November 2000 – 19 December 2002
- President: Milan Kučan
- Preceded by: Andrej Bajuk
- Succeeded by: Anton Rop
- In office 14 May 1992 – 7 June 2000
- President: Milan Kučan
- Preceded by: Lojze Peterle
- Succeeded by: Andrej Bajuk

President of the Presidency of Yugoslavia
- In office 15 May 1989 – 15 May 1990
- Prime Minister: Ante Marković
- Preceded by: Raif Dizdarević
- Succeeded by: Borisav Jović

11th Secretary General of the Non-Aligned Movement
- In office 7 September 1989 – 15 May 1990
- Preceded by: Robert Mugabe
- Succeeded by: Borisav Jović

Personal details
- Born: 17 May 1950 Celje, SR Slovenia, SFR Yugoslavia
- Died: 23 February 2008 (aged 57) Zaplana, Slovenia
- Party: Movement for Justice and Development (2006–2008)
- Other political affiliations: League of Communists (Before 1990); Liberal Democracy (1990–2006)
- Spouse: Majda Drnovšek (div. 1980)
- Children: 2
- Education: University of Ljubljana; University of Maribor

Janez Drnovšek (Slovene pronunciation: [ˈjàːnɛz dəɾˈnɔ́ːwʃək]; 17 May 1950 – 23 February 2008) was a Slovenian liberal politician, President of the Presidency of Yugoslavia (1989–1990), Prime Minister of Slovenia (1992–2002, with a short break in 2000) and President of Slovenia (2002–2007).

== Youth and early career ==
Drnovšek was born in Celje and was raised in the small town of Kisovec in the Municipality of Zagorje ob Savi, where his father Viktor (1925–2005) was the local mine chief and his mother Silva (1921–1976) was a homemaker. Drnovšek graduated from the University of Ljubljana with a degree in economics in 1973.

Meanwhile, he worked as an intern at a Le Havre bank. In 1975, at the age of 25, he became chief financial officer at SGP Beton Zagorje, a construction company. Two years later he became, for one year, an economic adviser at the Yugoslav embassy in Cairo.

He defended his master's thesis in 1981 and in 1986 he defended his dissertation at the Faculty of Economics and Business at the University of Maribor. In 1983, he became head of the local branch of Ljubljana Bank in his home region of the Central Sava Valley in central Slovenia. In 1986 he was chosen to be a delegate at the Slovenian Republic Assembly (parliament) and also the Chamber of Republics and Provinces of the Yugoslav parliament.

== Membership in the Yugoslav presidency ==
In 1989, Stane Dolanc, the Slovenian representative to the collective presidency of Yugoslavia, retired. The League of Communists of Slovenia, aware of upcoming democratisation, decided to organize elections between two candidates for the position. Drnovšek, until then rather unknown to the public, defeated Marko Bulc, the Party's preferred candidate.

The Communist leaderships of other Yugoslav republics did not agree with this new way of selecting the representative to the Collective Presidency, so the Slovenian Republic Parliament had to confirm the result of the elections. Drnovšek served as chairman of the Collective Presidency from 1989 to 1990. While he was chairman of the presidency, he was also chairman of the Non-Aligned Movement and the commander of the Yugoslav People's Army. In the capacity of the chairman of the Non-Aligned Movement Drnovšek notably opened the 9th Summit of the Non-Aligned Movement in Belgrade with the speech in Slovenian language.

Until the end of communist rule he was an active member of the Communist Party. After the democratic changes in Slovenia, the country seceded from Yugoslavia. Following the Ten Day War, Drnovšek used his position in the collective presidency to help mediate the Brioni Agreement and to negotiate a peaceful withdrawal of the Yugoslav army from Slovenia.

== Prime Minister of Slovenia ==
In 1992, after a Government crisis in the DEMOS coalition, which had won the first democratic elections in Slovenia in 1990 and led the country to independence, Drnovšek became the second Prime Minister of independent Slovenia. He was chosen as a compromise candidate and an expert in economic policy.

His bi-partisan government was supported both by the left and centrist wing of the dissolved DEMOS coalition (the Social Democratic Party of Slovenia, the Democratic Party and the Greens of Slovenia) and by three parties that derived from organizations of the former Communist regime (the Liberal Democratic Party, the Party of Democratic Reform and the Socialist Party of Slovenia).

Shortly afterwards, Drnovšek was elected president of the Liberal Democratic Party (Liberalno demokratska stranka – LDS), the legal successor of the Association of Socialist Youth of Slovenia (Zveza socialistične mladine Slovenije – ZSMS), the youth fraction of the Communist Party of Slovenia.

In 1992, the Liberal Democratic Party under Drnovšek's leadership won the parliamentary elections, but due to a high fragmentation of the popular vote had to ally itself with other parties in order to form a stable government. Despite a politically turbulent mandate (in 1994, the Social Democratic Party of Slovenia left the coalition), the Party gained votes in 1996, remaining the largest party in the government.

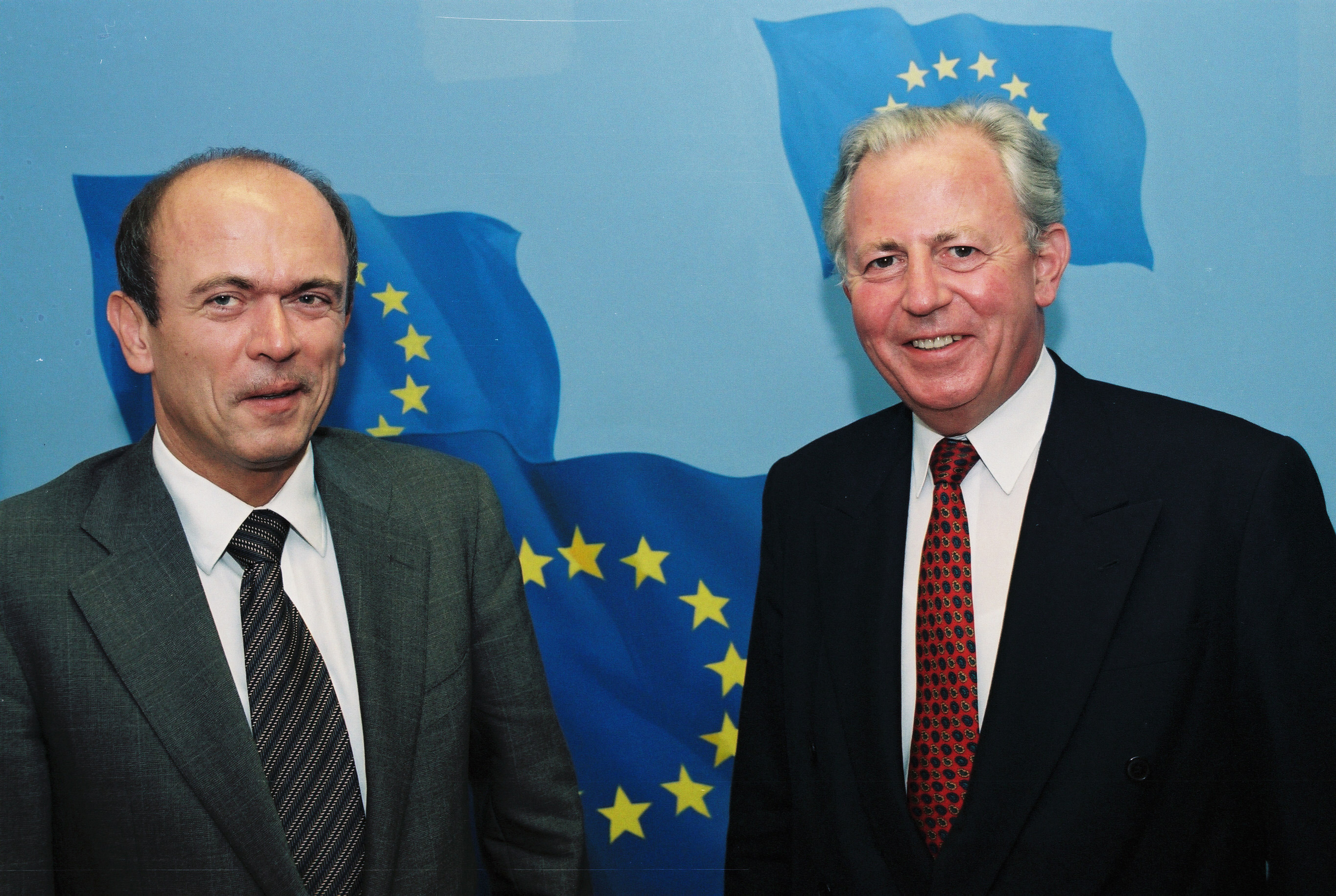
Drnovšek with Jacques Santer in 1996

Nevertheless, Drnovšek barely secured himself a third term in office after a failed attempt to ally himself with the Slovenian National Party. In 1997, the Liberal Democracy of Slovenia formed a coalition government with the populist Slovenian People's Party which finally enabled Drnovšek to serve a third term in office.

He headed the government until May 2000, when he stepped down due to disagreements with the Slovenian People's Party. After less than six months in opposition, Drnovšek returned to power in the autumn of 2000, after his party gained a clear victory in the parliamentary elections.

Drnovšek's governments guided Slovenia's political and economic reconstruction. He successfully tackled the twin tasks of reorienting Slovenia's trade away from the wreckage of the old Yugoslavia towards the West and replacing the ineffective Communist-era business model with more market-based mechanisms.

Unlike the other five former Yugoslav republics which were run for much of the 1990s by frequently authoritarian presidents, Slovenia under Drnovšek's premiership quickly emerged from the break-up of the federation as a functioning parliamentary democracy. Drnovšek's political strategy was concentrated on broad coalitions, transcending ideological and programmatic divisions between parties.

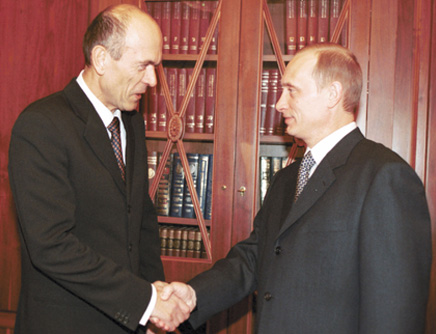
Drnovšek with Vladimir Putin in 2001

Contrary to some other former Communist countries in Eastern Europe, the economic and social transformation in Slovenia pursued by Drnovšek's governments followed a gradualist approach.

Drnovšek was a staunch supporter of Slovenia's entry in the European Union and NATO and was largely responsible for Slovenia's successful bid for membership in both of those organizations. As Prime minister, he was frequently active on foreign policy issues. On 16 June 2001, he helped to arrange the first meeting of the U.S. President George W. Bush with the Russian President Vladimir Putin, which was held in the Upper Carniolan estate of Brdo pri Kranju. (Bush-Putin 2001) In 2002, he ran for President of Slovenia, and was elected in the second round, defeating the center-right candidate Barbara Brezigar.

== President of Slovenia and the change in lifestyle ==
Drnovšek's presidency was highly controversial. In the first three years in office, he rarely appeared in public, save for the most important official duties. In 2006, however, a change of style became visible. He launched several campaigns in foreign policy, such as a failed humanitarian mission to Darfur and a proposal for the solution of the political crisis in Kosovo. On January 30, 2006, he left the Liberal Democracy of Slovenia. Shortly afterwards, he founded the Movement for Justice and Development and became its first president. He claimed this was not meant to be a political movement, but rather a wide initiative, aiming to "raise human consciousness and make the world a better place". On June 26, 2006, he announced that he would not be running for a second term in an interview on TV Slovenia.

=== Conflict with the Government ===
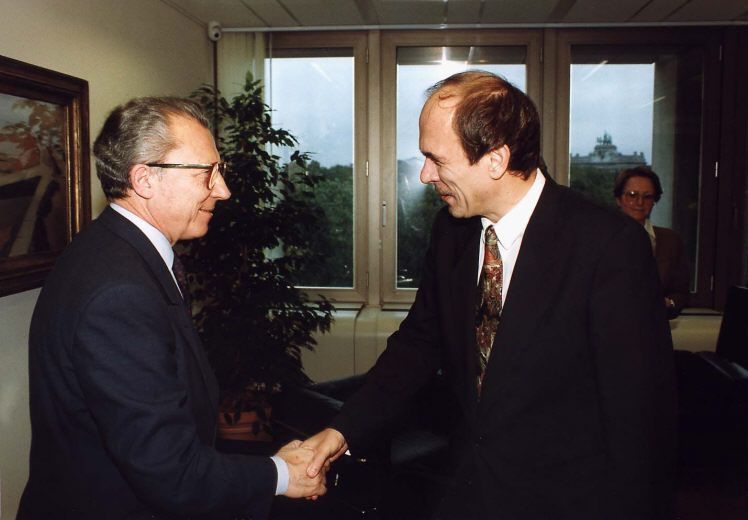
Drnovšek with Jacques Delors in 1989

The 2004 legislative election brought further changes and a political swing to the right. Janez Janša, the leader of a right-wing coalition, formed the new government. In Slovenia, this was the first time after 1992 that the President and the Prime Minister had represented opposing political factions for more than a few months. Between 2002 and 2004, the relationship between President Drnovšek and Janez Janša, then leader of the opposition, were considered more than good and in the first year of cohabitation, no major problems arose.

In the beginning of his term, Drnovšek, who was ill with kidney cancer, stayed out of public view. When he reemerged in late 2005 he had already changed his lifestyle: he had become a vegan (though one of his colleagues in a televised interview mentioned their regular Sunday visits to a pizzeria in Maxi market, Ljubljana), moved out of the capital into the countryside, and withdrew from party politics completely, ending his already frozen membership in the Liberal Democracy. Drnovšek's new approach to politics prompted one political commentator to nickname him "Slovenia's Gandhi".

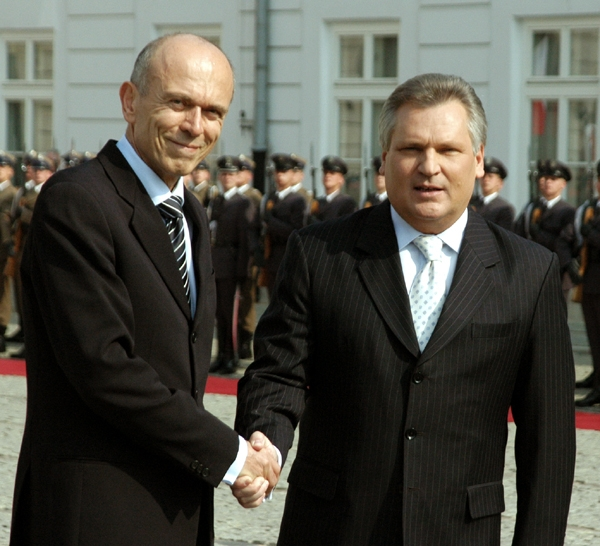
Drnovšek with Aleksander Kwaśniewski in 2005

The relationship between Drnovšek and the government quickly became tense. Disagreements began with Drnovšek's initiatives in foreign politics, aimed at solving major foreign conflicts, including those in Darfur and Kosovo. Initially, these initiatives were not openly opposed by the Prime Minister Janez Janša, but were criticized by the foreign minister Dimitrij Rupel, Drnovšek's former collaborator and close political ally until 2004.

A major clash between the two happened in Summer 2006, when disagreement arose over Drnovšek's attempt to intervene in the Darfur conflict. The disagreements moved from issues of domestic politics in October 2006, when Drnovšek publicly criticised the treatment of the Strojans, a Romani family whose neighborhood had forced them to relocate, which in turn had subjected them to police supervision and limitation of movement.

The disagreements however escalated when the parliamentary majority repeatedly rejected President's candidates for the Governor of the Bank of Slovenia, beginning with the rejection of incumbent Mitja Gaspari. The friction continued over the appointment of other state official nominees, including Constitutional Court judges. Although the President's political support suffered after his personal transformation, the polls nevertheless showed public backing of the President against an increasingly unpopular Government.

The tension reached its apex in May 2007, when the newly appointed director of the Slovenian Intelligence and Security Agency Matjaž Šinkovec unclassified several documents from the period before 2004, revealing, among other, that Drnovšek had used secret service funds for personal purposes between 2002 and 2004. The President reacted with a harsh criticism of the government's policies, accusing the ruling coalition of abusing its power for personal delegitimations and labeled the then current Prime Minister Janez Janša as "the leader of the negative guys"

In the last months in office, Drnovšek continued his attacks on Prime Minister Janez Janša, who mostly remained silent on the issue. Drnovšek accused Janša of "fostering proto-totalitarian tendencies". He became a blogger (Janez D), signing his posts as "Janez D" and expressing opinions on various issues from foreign policy, environmentalism, human relationships, religion, animal rights and personal growth. In his last months in office, he withdrew to a reclusive life again, devoting his time to the Movement for Justice and Development and the popularization of his lifestyle and views.

=== Lifestyle changes ===
During his time in office as the President of Slovenia, he wrote and published several books in spiritual philosophy, including Misli o življenju in zavedanju ("Thoughts on Life and Consciousness"), Zlate misli o življenju in zavedanju ("Golden Thoughts on Life and Consciousness"), Bistvo sveta ("The Essence of the World"), and his last one called Pogovori or Dialogues. According to his own accounts, it took him only two or three weeks to write each of his books, due to – in his words – "the higher consciousness" he was able to access.

His lifestyle was a mixture of elements from various traditions, including Hindu religious thought and the non-attachment of Buddhist philosophy. He also valued the indigenous traditions of the world. For example, he was present at the inauguration of Evo Morales, the first native American president of Bolivia, and later hosted Bolivian ethnic musicians in the Presidential Palace in Ljubljana. After his cancer diagnosis, Drnovšek became a vegan and claimed that this greatly improved his health.

Because of his new lifestyle and the content of his books and blogs, he was often regarded as an adherent of the New Age movement, although he rejected such a qualification as being too narrow.

== Personal life and death ==
Drnovšek was fluent in six languages, namely his native Slovene, Serbo-Croatian, English, Spanish, French and German. He was divorced with one son, Jaša, who is a translator and journalist.

In 2005, he found out about the existence of a daughter, Nana Forte, otherwise a renowned composer. His sister is Helena Drnovšek Zorko, who has been the Slovenian ambassador in Japan since September 2010.

=== Death ===
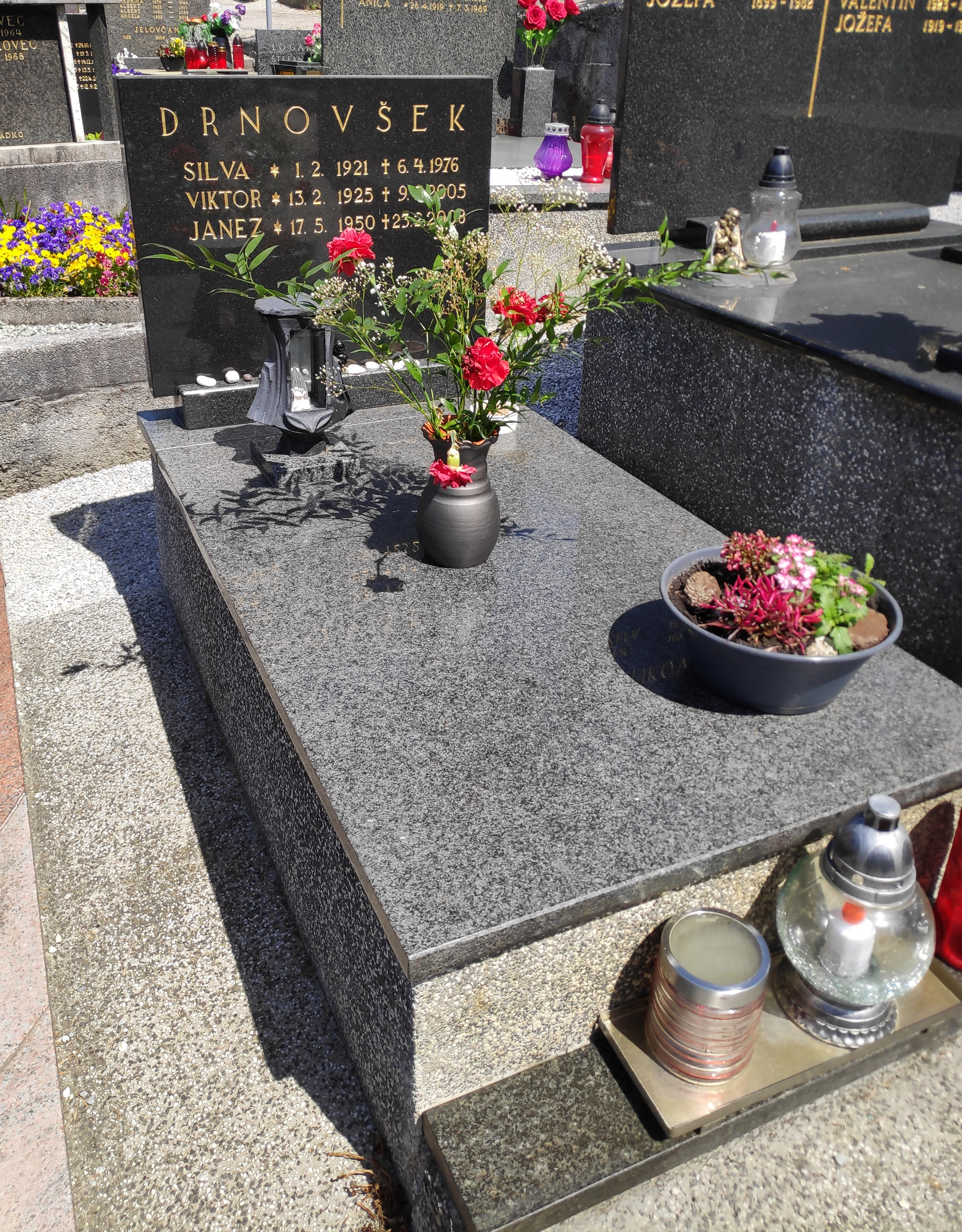
Grave of Drnovšek family

In 1999, Drnovšek had kidney cancer resulting in the removal of a kidney. In 2001, he had cancerous formations on his lungs and liver. He repeatedly claimed nature was the best cure, and spent most of his days at his home in Zaplana. He died there on February 23, 2008, aged 57, just two months after his presidential term ended. His body was cremated shortly afterwards. His remains were buried with honors in a private memorial service in his native Zagorje ob Savi, alongside his parents.

== Books by Drnovšek ==
- Pogovori (Conversations). Mladinska knjiga, 2007 COBISS 233261568
- Bistvo sveta (Essence of the World). Mladinska knjiga, 2006 COBISS 229734912
- Misli o življenju in zavedanju (Thoughts on life and awareness). Mladinska knjiga, 2006 COBISS 226607872
- Escape from Hell (published as e-book).
- El laberinto de los Balcanes. Edicciones B, 1999. COBISS 104335360
- Moja resnica : Jugoslavija 1989 - Slovenija 1991 (My truth: Yugoslavia 1989 - Slovenia 1991). Mladinska knjiga, 1996. COBISS 58078720

== Honours ==
=== National honours ===
- Gold Order of Freedom of the Republic of Slovenia, 1992

=== Foreign honours ===
Ribbon	Distinction	Country	Date	Reference
	Order of Makarios III	Cyprus	1990	
	Grand Collar of the Order of Prince Henry	Portugal	1990	
	Order of the White Double Cross, 1st Class	Slovakia	14 October 2003	
	Grand Cross of the Order of Saint-Charles	Monaco	31 May 2006	

Political offices
Preceded by Raif Dizdarević	President of the Presidency of SFR Yugoslavia; 1989–1990	Succeeded by Borisav Jović
Preceded by Milan Kučan	President of Slovenia; 2002–2007	Succeeded by Danilo Türk
Preceded by Lojze Peterle	Prime Minister of Slovenia; 1992–2000	Succeeded by Andrej Bajuk
Preceded by Andrej Bajuk	Prime Minister of Slovenia; 2000–2002	Succeeded by Anton Rop
Diplomatic posts
Preceded by Robert Mugabe	Secretary General of Non-Aligned Movement; 1989–1990	Succeeded by Borisav Jović
Party political offices
Preceded by Jožef Školč	President of Liberal Democracy; 1992–2002	Succeeded by Anton Rop
