= 13th Government of Slovenia =

Government of Slovenia from 2018 to 2020

Šarec Cabinet
- 13th Cabinet of Slovenia

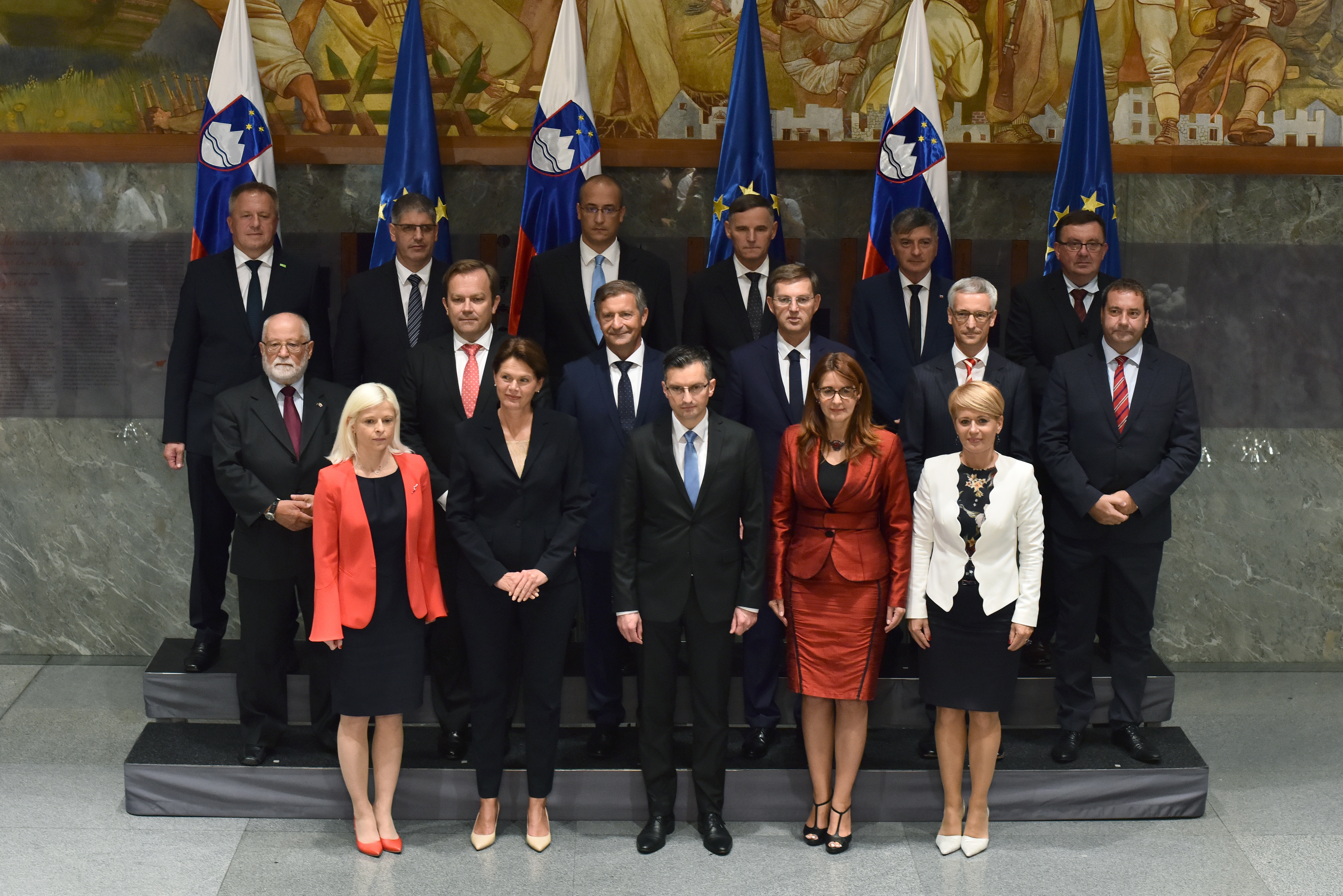
- Date formed: 13 September 2018
- Date dissolved: 13 March 2020

People and organisations
- Head of state: Borut Pahor
- Head of government: Prime Minister Marjan Šarec (LMŠ)
- Deputy head of government: Deputy Prime Ministers: Miro Cerar (SMC); Alenka Bratušek (SAB); Karl Erjavec (DeSUS); Jernej Pikalo (SD); Andrej Bertoncelj (LMŠ)
- No. of ministers: 16 (2 of them without portfolio)
- Ministers removed: 5
- Total no. of members: 21
- Member party: List of Marjan Šarec Social Democrats Modern Centre Party Party of Alenka Bratušek Democratic Party of Pensioners of Slovenia United Left (confidence and supply until 2019)
- Status in legislature: Minority (coalition)
- Opposition cabinet: None
- Opposition party: Slovenian Democratic Party New Slovenia Slovenian National Party United Left (since 2019)
- Opposition leader: Janez Janša (SDS); Luka Mesec (Levica); Matej Tonin (NSi); Zmago Jelinčič Plemeniti (SNS)

History
- Election: 2018 election
- Legislature term: 8th National Assembly
- Budgets: State budget (1 of 4 public budgets; excluding municipalities budgets, ZPIZ and ZZZS); 2018: 9.625 billion € (▲1.03%); 2019: 10.160 billion € (▲5.56%); 2020: 10.350 billion € (▲1.87%); 2021: 10.455 billion € (▲1.01%)
- Predecessor: Cerar Cabinet
- Successor: Janša III Cabinet

The 13th Government of Slovenia was elected on 13 September 2018 by the 8th National Assembly. It is the first minority government in the history of Slovenia. On 27 January 2020, following the resignation of the Minister of Finance Andrej Bertoncelj, Prime Minister Marjan Šarec announced his resignation. The National Assembly was informed on the same day following which the term of the 13th Government ended. Šarec is the third consecutive and in total fourth Prime Minister to resign, before him Miro Cerar, Alenka Bratušek and Janez Drnovšek resigned as well, the latter due to being elected President of the Republic. The 13th Government is the fifth consecutive and eighth government in total to not finish its term.

== Formation ==
After the 3 June 2018 parliamentary elections, Marjan Šarec, leader of LMŠ, began coalition talks with SD, SMC, SAB and DeSUS. Shortly after that New Slovenia (NSi) joined the talks in order to become the sixth coalition party and ensure a parliamentary majority of at least 46 votes. The newly elected National Assembly held its first session on 22 June 2018 and that meant the first round of the election of Prime Minister began. NSi withdrew from coalition talks on 16 July, close to the expiration of the first round, which meant that for the first time in history there will be no candidate for Prime Minister in the first round of election.

On 27 July 2018, the second round of the election began and parties gathered around Marjan Šarec and LMŠ began talks with The Left, which gradually led to forming a new coalition and government. However, The Left was first negotiating to join the government but later decided to not join it. Membership of the party decided on the internal referendum that the party will support the new government from the opposition.

On 8 August 2018 MPs of LMŠ, SD, SMC, SAB and DeSUS submitted the candidature of Marjan Šarec for the 13th Prime Minister of Slovenia. It was unsure at first whether Šarec has enough votes to be elected, since The Left has not decided if it will support his candidature and government by the time candidature was submitted. On 10 August parties of the coalition and The Left initialed an agreement about cooperation which secured Šarec enough votes for election. On 17 August Šarec was elected Prime Minister, and has 15 days to announce candidates for ministers.

On 20 August leaders of the coalition parties met to decide which ministries will be led by each party:

Minister	Party
Minister of Agriculture, Forestry and Food	DeSUS
Minister of Culture	SD
Minister of Defence	DeSUS
Minister of Economic Development and Technology	SMC
Minister of Education, Science and Sport	SD
Minister of Environment and Spatial Planning	SMC
Minister of Finance	LMŠ
Minister of Foreign Affairs	SMC
Minister of Health	LMŠ
Minister of Infrastructure	SAB
Minister of Interior	LMŠ
Minister of Justice	SD
Minister of Labour, Family, Social Affairs and Equal Opportunities	SMC
Minister of Public Administration	LMŠ
Minister without portfolio for Slovenian diaspora	SAB
Minister without Portfolio responsible for Development, Strategic Projects and Cohesion	SAB

On 29 August 2018 Marjan Šarec (LMŠ), Dejan Židan (SD), Miro Cerar (SMC), Alenka Bratušek (SAB) and Karl Erjavec (DeSUS) signed coalition agreement and officially formed new government coalition. It was also announced that list of candidates for minister will be submitted to the National Assembly on Friday, 31 August 2018.

On 4 September 2018 National Assembly began with hearings of 16 candidates of ministers. Hearings took place on 5 and 6 September as well. On 5 September Marjan Šarec announced that he will replace Tugomir Kodelja, candidate for Minister of Public Administration, who was already confirmed by the committee, with another candidate. Rudi Medved was announced candidate on 7 September.

On 13 September 2018 13th Government of the Republic of Slovenia was officially elected with 45 votes in favor.

== Government coalition ==
Government coalition will be formed of five parties and had parliamentary support of an additional party.

Party		Leader	MPs	Coalition MPs	Ministers
LMŠ	List of Marjan Šarec; Lista Marjana Šarca	Marjan Šarec; Prime Minister	13 / 90	13 / 43	4 / 16
SD	Social Democrats; Socialni demokrati	Dejan Židan; MP, Speaker of the National Assembly	10 / 90	10 / 43	3 / 16
SMC	Modern Centre Party; Stranka modernega centra	Zdravko Počivalšek; Minister of Economic Development and Technology	10 / 90	10 / 43	4 / 16
SAB	Party of Alenka Bratušek; Stranka Alenke Bratušek	Alenka Bratušek; Minister of Infrastructure	5 / 90	5 / 43	3 / 16
DeSUS	Democratic Party of Pensioners of Slovenia; Demokratična stranka upokojencev Slovenije	Aleksandra Pivec; Minister of Agriculture, Forestry and Food	5 / 90	5 / 43	2 / 16
Parliamentary support:
Levica	Left (until 2019); Levica	Luka Mesec	9 / 90	–	–
IMNS	Italian and Hungarian National Minorities; Italijanska in madžarska narodna skupnost	Felice Žiža; Ferench Horváth	2 / 90	–	–
Total:
Government			43 / 90		
Support			11 / 90		
Total			54 / 90		

== Composition ==
13th Government of Slovenia: 13. Vlada Republike Slovenije
Cabinet
Office	Designee	Office	Designee
Prime Minister; Predsednik vlade – Announced August 8, 2018; Elected August 17, 2018; Took office September 13, 2018	Former Mayor of Kamnik, Former MP; Marjan Šarec (LMŠ)	Deputy Prime Minister and Minister of Foreign Affairs; Minister za zunanje zadeve (MZZ) – Announced August 30, 2018; Took office September 13, 2018	Former Prime Minister, Professor; Miro Cerar PhD (SMC)
Deputy Prime Minister and Minister of Infrastructure; Minister za infrastrukturo (MI) – Announced August 30, 2018; Took office September 13, 2018	Former Prime Minister; Alenka Bratušek MA (SAB)	Deputy Prime Minister and Minister of Defence; Minister za obrambo (MORS) – Announced August 30, 2018; Took office September 13, 2018	Former Minister (MZZ, MORS, MOP); Karl Erjavec (DeSUS)
Deputy Prime Minister and Minister of Finance; Minister za finance (MF) – Announced August 30, 2018; Took office September 13, 2018	Professor, Businessman; Andrej Bertoncelj PhD (LMŠ/Ind.)	Deputy Prime Minister and Minister of Education, Science and Sport; Minister za izobraževanje, znanost in šport (MIZŠ) – Announced August 30, 2018; Took office September 13, 2018	Former Minister (MIZŠ); Jernej Pikalo PhD (SD)
Office	Designee	Office	Designee
Minister of Culture; Minister za kulturo (MK) – Announced February 27, 2019; Took office March 8, 2019	Zoran Poznič (SD)	Minister of Agriculture, Forestry and Food; Minister za kmetijstvo, gozdarstvo in prehrano (MKGP) – Announced August 30, 2018; Took office September 13, 2018	Former State Secretary (USZS); Aleksandra Pivec PhD (DeSUS)
Minister of Economic Development and Technology; Minister za gospodarski razvoj in tehnologijo (MGRT) – Announced August 30, 2018; Took office September 13, 2018	Minister (MGRT); Zdravko Počivalšek (SMC)	Minister of Environment and Spatial Planning; Minister za okolje in prostor (MOP) – Announced March 20, 2019; Took office March 29, 2019	Former MP; Simon Zajc (SMC)
Minister of Health; Minister za zdravje (MZ) – Announced March 20, 2019; Took office March 29, 2019	Aleš Šabeder (LMŠ/Ind.)	Minister of Interior; Minister za notranje zadeve (MNZ) – Announced August 30, 2018; Took office September 13, 2018	Boštjan Poklukar (LMŠ)
Minister of Justice; Minister za pravosodje (MP) – Announced August 30, 2018; Took office September 13, 2018	Former Minister (MORS); Andreja Katič (SD)	Minister of Labour, Family, Social Affairs and Equal Opportunities; Minister za delo, družino, socialne zadeve in enake možnosti (MDDSDEM) – Announced August 30, 2018; Took office September 13, 2018	Former State Secretary (MJU); Ksenija Klampfer MA (SMC)
Minister of Public Administration; Minister za javno upravo (MJU) – Announced September 7, 2018; Took office September 13, 2018	Former MP; Rudi Medved (LMŠ)	Minister without portfolio for Slovenian diaspora Minister brez resorja za Slovence v zamejstvu in po svetu (USZS) – Announced August 30, 2018; Took office September 13, 2018	Former MP; Peter Jožef Česnik (SAB)
Minister without Portfolio responsible for Development, Strategic Projects and Cohesion; Minister brez resorja za področje razvoja, strateške projekte in kohezijo (SVRK) – Announced December 16, 2019; Took office December 19, 2019	Former MEP; Angelika Mlinar PhD (SAB)		
Other officials
Office	Designee	Office	Designee
Secretary-General of the Government; Generalni sekretar vlade – Took office September 13, 2018	Stojan Tramte (LMŠ)	Chief of the Office of the Prime Minister; Šef kabineta predsednika vlade – Took office September 13, 2018	Janja Zorman Macura (LMŠ)
Director of the Government Office of Legislation; Vodja Službe vlade za zakonodajo – Took office February 21, 2019	Rado Fele (Ind.)	National Security Adviser to the Prime Minister; Svetovalec predsednika vlade za nacionalno varnost – Took office September 13, 2018	Former Director of SOVA; Damir Črnčec PhD
– Chief of the General Staff of the Slovenian Armed Forces; Načelnik generalštaba Slovenske vojske – Took office 28 November 2018	Major General; Alenka Ermenc MA	– Director General of the Police; Generalni direktor policije – Took office 5 October 2018	Former Deputy-Director General; Tatjana Bobnar MA
Director of the Slovene Intelligence and Security Agency; Direktor Slovenske obveščevalno-varnostne agencije (SOVA) – Took office 27 September 2018	Rajko Kozmelj	Chief of Protocol; Šef protokola – Took office 1 October 2018	Aleksander Strel MA
Individual announced for position; Individual confirmed by the National Assembly; Individual confirmed by the Government; Individual serving in an acting capacity (following resignation)
Source: http://www.vlada.si/

=== Former members ===
Minister		Office	Left office	Succeeded by
SAB	Marko Bandelli	Minister without Portfolio responsible for Development, Strategic Projects and Cohesion	December 21, 2018	Iztok Purič
SD	Dejan Prešiček	Minister of Culture	March 8, 2019	Zoran Poznič
SMC	Jure Leben	Minister of Environment and Spatial Planning	March 29, 2019	Simon Zajc
LMŠ	Samo Fakin	Minister of Health	March 29, 2019	Aleš Šabeder
SAB	Iztok Purič	Minister without Portfolio responsible for Development, Strategic Projects and Cohesion	October 7, 2019	Alenka Bratušek as Acting Minister
SAB	Alenka Bratušek	Minister without Portfolio responsible for Development, Strategic Projects and Cohesion	October 19, 2019	Angelika Mlinar
DeSUS	Karl Erjavec	Minister of Defence		

=== State Secretaries ===
Ministry/Office	State Seceratries
Office of the Prime Minister	Anja Kopač Mrak
Office of the Prime Minister	Tadeja Forštner Perklič
Office of the Prime Minister	Igor Mally
Office of the Prime Minister	Uroš Prikl
Office of the Prime Minister	Vojmir Urlep
Office of the Prime Minister	Damir Črnčec
Office of the Prime Minister	Franc Vesel
Ministry of Agriculture, Forestry and Food	Tanja Strniša
Ministry of Agriculture, Forestry and Food	Jože Podgoršek
Ministry of Culture	Petra Culetto
Ministry of Culture	Tanja Kerševan Smokvina
Ministry of Defence	Miloš Bizjak
Ministry of Defence	Klemen Grošelj
Ministry of Economic Development and Technology	Aleš Centarutti
Ministry of Economic Development and Technology	Eva Štravs Podlogar
Ministry of Eduacation, Science and Sport	Martina Vuk
Ministry of Eduacation, Science and Sport	Jernej Štromajer
Ministry of Environment and Spatial Planning	Aleš Prijon
Ministry of Environment and Spatial Planning	Marko Maver
Ministry of Finance	Metod Dragonja
Ministry of Finance	Natalija Kovač Jereb
Ministry of Finance	Saša Jazbec
Ministry of Finance	Alojz Stana
Ministry of Foreign Affairs	Simona Leskovar
Ministry of Foreign Affairs	Major General Dobran Božič
Ministry of Health	Tomaž Pliberšek
Ministry of Health	Simona Repar Bornšek
Ministry of Infrastructure	Bojan Kumer
Ministry of Infrastructure	Nina Mauhler
Ministry of Interior	Melita Šinkovec
Ministry of Interior	Sandi Čurin
Ministry of Justice	Dominika Švarc Pipan
Ministry of Justice	Gregor Strojin
Ministry of Labour, Family, Social Affairs and Equal Opportunities	Breda Božnik
Ministry of Labour, Family, Social Affairs and Equal Opportunities	Tilen Božič
Ministry of Public Administration	Mojca Ramšak Pešec
Ministry of Public Administration	Leon Behin
Office for Slovenian Abroad	Olga Belec
Office for Development and European Cohesion Policy	Nevenka Ribič
Former:
Andreja Vraničar Erman, Ministry of Finance
Roman Kirn, Office of the Prime Minister
Jan Škoberne, Minister of Culture
Vojko Stopar, Minister of Culture
Natalija Kovač Jereb, Ministry of Interior, now Ministry of Finance
Simon Zajc, Ministry of Environment and Spatial Planning
Pia Vračko, Ministry of Health

== Working bodies ==
Working body	President
Committee on Economy	Jernej Pikalo, Deputy Prime Minister and Minister of Education, Science and Sport
Committee on the Organisation of the State and Public Affairs	Ksenija Klampfer, Minister of Labour, Family, Social Affairs and Equal Opportunities
Committee on Administrative Affairs and Appointments	Rudi Medved, Minister of Public Administration

== Bodies within ministries ==
Ministry	Body	Head
Ministry of Agriculture, Forestry and Food	Agency of the Republic of Slovenia for Agricultural Markets and Rural Development	Miran Mihelič
Ministry of Agriculture, Forestry and Food	Administration of the Republic of Slovenia for Food Safety, Veterinary Sector and Plant Protection	Janez Posedi
Ministry of Agriculture, Forestry and Food	Inspectorate of the Republic of Slovenia for Agriculture, Forestry, Hunting and Fisheries	Saša Dragar Milanovič
Ministry of Culture	Culture and Media Inspectorate of the Republic of Slovenia	Sonja Trančar
Ministry of Culture	Archives of the Republic of Slovenia	Bojan Cvelfar
Ministry of Defence	General Staff of the Slovenian Armed Forces	Major General Alan Geder
Ministry of Defence	Administration of the Republic of Slovenia for Civil Protection and Disaster Relief	Darko But
Ministry of Defence	Inspectorate of the Republic of Slovenia for Protection against Natural and Other Disasters	Boris Balant
Ministry of Defence	Defence Inspectorate of the Republic of Slovenia	Roman Zupanec
Ministry of Economic Development and Technology	Market Inspectorate of the Republic of Slovenia	Andrejka Grlić
Ministry of Economic Development and Technology	Slovenian Intellectual Property Office	Vojko Toman
Ministry of Economic Development and Technology	Metrology Institute of the Republic of Slovenia	Samo Kopač
Ministry of Eduacation, Science and Sport	Inspectorate for Education and Sport of the Republic of Slovenia	Tomaž Rozman
Ministry of Eduacation, Science and Sport	Office of the Republic of Slovenia for Youth	Rok Primožič
Ministry of Environment and Spatial Planning	Slovenian Environment Agency	Gregor Sluga
Ministry of Environment and Spatial Planning	Inspectorate of the Republic of Slovenia for the Environment and Spatial Planning	
Ministry of Environment and Spatial Planning	Slovenian Nuclear Safety Administration	
Ministry of Environment and Spatial Planning	Surveying and Mapping Authority of the Republic of Slovenia	
Ministry of Environment and Spatial Planning	Slovenian Water Agency	
Ministry of Finance	Financial administration of the Republic of Slovenia	
Ministry of Finance	Office for Money Laundering Prevention of the Republic of Slovenia	
Ministry of Finance	Public Payments Administration of the Republic of Slovenia	
Ministry of Finance	Budget Supervision Office of the Republic of Slovenia	
Ministry of Health	Health Inspectorate of the Republic of Slovenia	
Ministry of Health	Chemicals Office of the Republic of Slovenia	
Ministry of Health	Slovenian Radiation Protection Administration	
Ministry of Infrastructure	Inspectorate for infrastructure of the Republic of Slovenia	
Ministry of Infrastructure	Slovenian Maritime Administration	
Ministry of Infrastructure	Slovenian Infrastructure Agency	
Ministry of Interior	Police	
Ministry of Interior	Inspectorate for Interior Affairs	
Ministry of Justice	Prison Administration of the Republic of Slovenia	
Ministry of Labour, Family, Social Affairs and Equal Opportunities	Labour Inspectorate of the Republic od Slovenia	
Ministry of Public Administration	Public Sector Inspectorate	

== Advisory bodies ==
Body	Head
Fiscal Council	President Davorin Kračun
Economic and Social Council of the Republic of Slovenia	President Lidija Jerkič

== Interpellations ==
Date	Proposer	Interpellated	Quorum	In favour	Against	Abstain	Comments
No interpellation has yet been submitted.

== Confirmation process timeline ==
Government confirmation process												
Office	Name	Party	Announcement	Hearing date	Committee	Committee vote			National Assembly vote date	Confirmation		
Office	Name	Party	Announcement	Hearing date	Committee	Y	N	A		Y	N	A
Prime Minister	Marjan Šarec	LMŠ	8 August 2018	/	/	/			17 August 2018	55	31	11
Minister of Agriculture, Forestry and Food	Aleksandra Pivec	DeSUS	30 August 2018	4 September 2018	CAFF	10	6	1	13 September 2018	45	34	11
Minister of Culture	Dejan Prešiček	SD	30 August 2018	5 September 2018	CC	12	1	4	13 September 2018	45	34	11
Minister of Defence	Karl Erjavec	DeSUS	30 August 2018	6 September 2018	CD	8	6	3	13 September 2018	45	34	11
Minister of Economic Development and Technology	Zdravko Počivalšek	SMC	30 August 2018	6 September 2018	CE	11	0	6	13 September 2018	45	34	11
Minister of Education, Science and Sport	Jernej Pikalo	SD	30 August 2018	4 September 2018	CESSY	9	4	4	13 September 2018	45	34	11
Minister of Environment and Spatial Planning	Jure Leben	SMC	30 August 2018	5 September 2018	CIESP	11	2	4	13 September 2018	45	34	11
Minister of Finance	Andrej Bertoncelj	LMŠ	30 August 2018	6 September 2018	CF	10	0	9	13 September 2018	45	34	11
Minister of Foreign Affairs	Miro Cerar	SMC	30 August 2018	4 September 2018	CFP	9	0	9	13 September 2018	45	34	11
Minister of Health	Samo Fakin	LMŠ	30 August 2018	5 September 2018	CH	12	5	2	13 September 2018	45	34	11
Minister of Infrastructure	Alenka Bratušek	SAB	30 August 2018	5 September 2018	CIESP	11	4	4	13 September 2018	45	34	11
Minister of Interior	Boštjan Poklukar	LMŠ	30 August 2018	4 September 2018	CIPALSG	10	7	2	13 September 2018	45	34	11
Minister of Justice	Andreja Katič	SD	30 August 2018	6 September 2018	CJ	7	4	2	13 September 2018	45	34	11
Minister of Labour, Family, Social Affairs and Equal Opportunities	Ksenija Klampfer	SMC	30 August 2018	6 September 2018	CLFSPD	8	3	6	13 September 2018	45	34	11
Minister of Public Administration	Tugomir Kodelja (replaced)	LMŠ	30 August 2018	4 September 2018	CIPALSG	10	5	4				
Minister of Public Administration	Rudi Medved	LMŠ	7 September 2018	10 September 2018	CIPALSG	9	4	6	13 September 2018	45	34	11
Minister without portfolio for Slovenian diaspora	Peter Jožef Česnik	SAB	30 August 2018	5 September 2018	CRSNOC	6	2	5	13 September 2018	45	34	11
Minister without Portfolio responsible for Development, Strategic Projects and Cohesion	Marko Bandelli (resigned)	SAB	30 August 2018	4 September 2018	CEU	9	5	3	13 September 2018	45	34	11
Minister without Portfolio responsible for Development, Strategic Projects and Cohesion	Marko Bandelli (resigned)	SAB	30 August 2018	4 September 2018	CE	10	4	3	13 September 2018	45	34	11
Minister without Portfolio responsible for Development, Strategic Projects and Cohesion	Iztok Purič	SAB	28 September 2018	3 December 2018	CEU	8	4	5	19 December 2018	45	30	15
Minister without Portfolio responsible for Development, Strategic Projects and Cohesion	Iztok Purič	SAB	28 September 2018	3 December 2018	CE	8	4	5	19 December 2018	45	30	15

== Cabinet ==
=== Minister of Agriculture, Forestry and Food ===
It was very clear from the beginning of the negotiations that DeSUS will take over Ministry of Agriculture, Forestry and Food. SD stated that they do not want to take over the Ministry after Dejan Židan led it in the Pahor, Bratušek and Cerar government. There were some speculations that SMC's Zdravko Počivalšek might become minister if SMC will not take over Ministry of Economy.

Candidates

Candidates for Minister of Agriculture, Forestry and Food

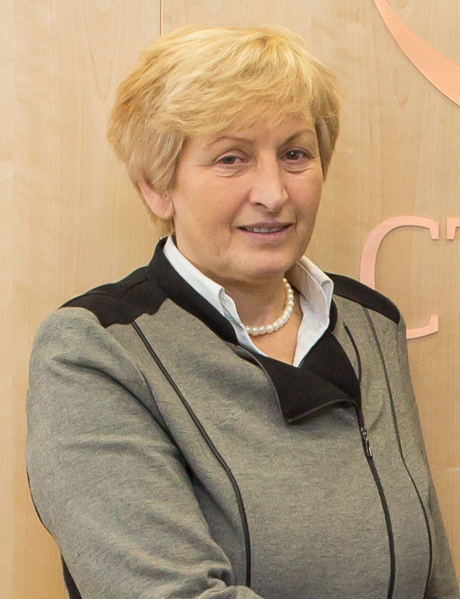
Irena Majcen

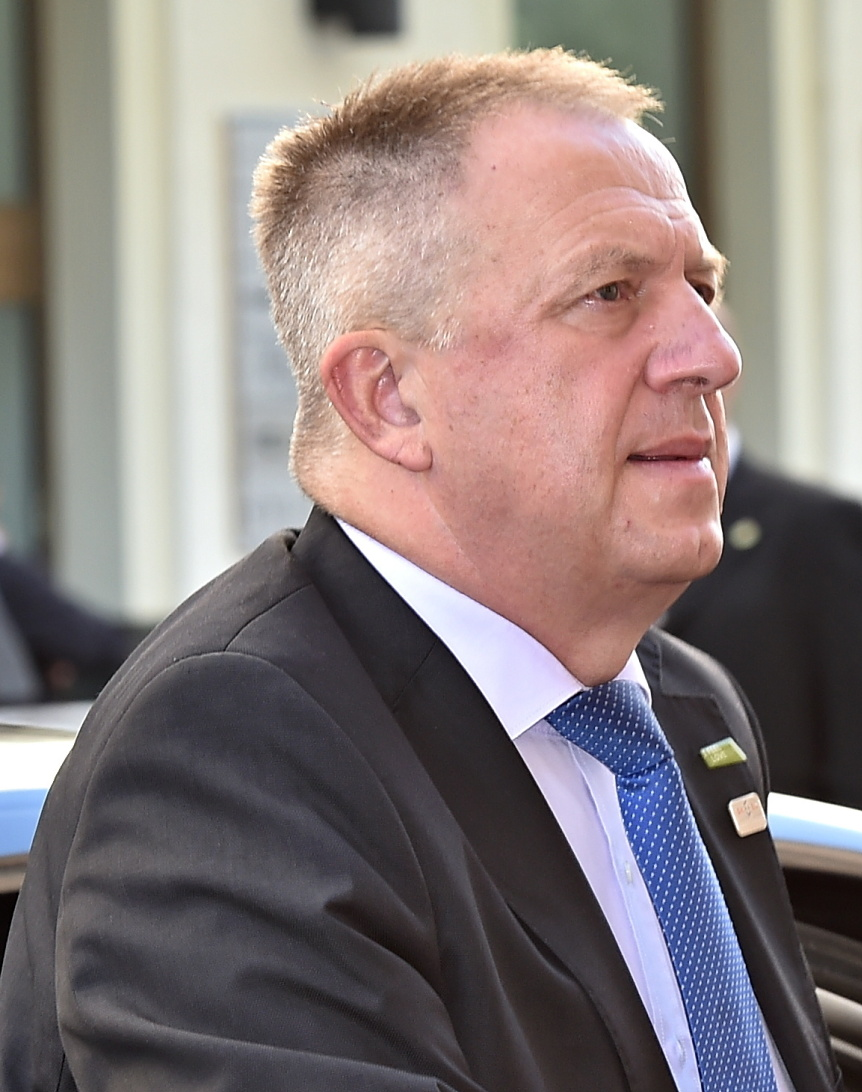
Zdravko Počivalšek (SMC)

=== Minister of Culture ===
Social Democrats was the only party that publicly showed their interest to take over Ministry of Culture.

Candidates

Candidates for Minister of Culture

Dejan Prešiček (SD)

Miran Zupanič (SD)

=== Minister of Defence ===
Karl Erjavec was seen as a candidate for Minister of Defence from the beginning of the negotiations.

Candidates

Candidates for Minister of Defence

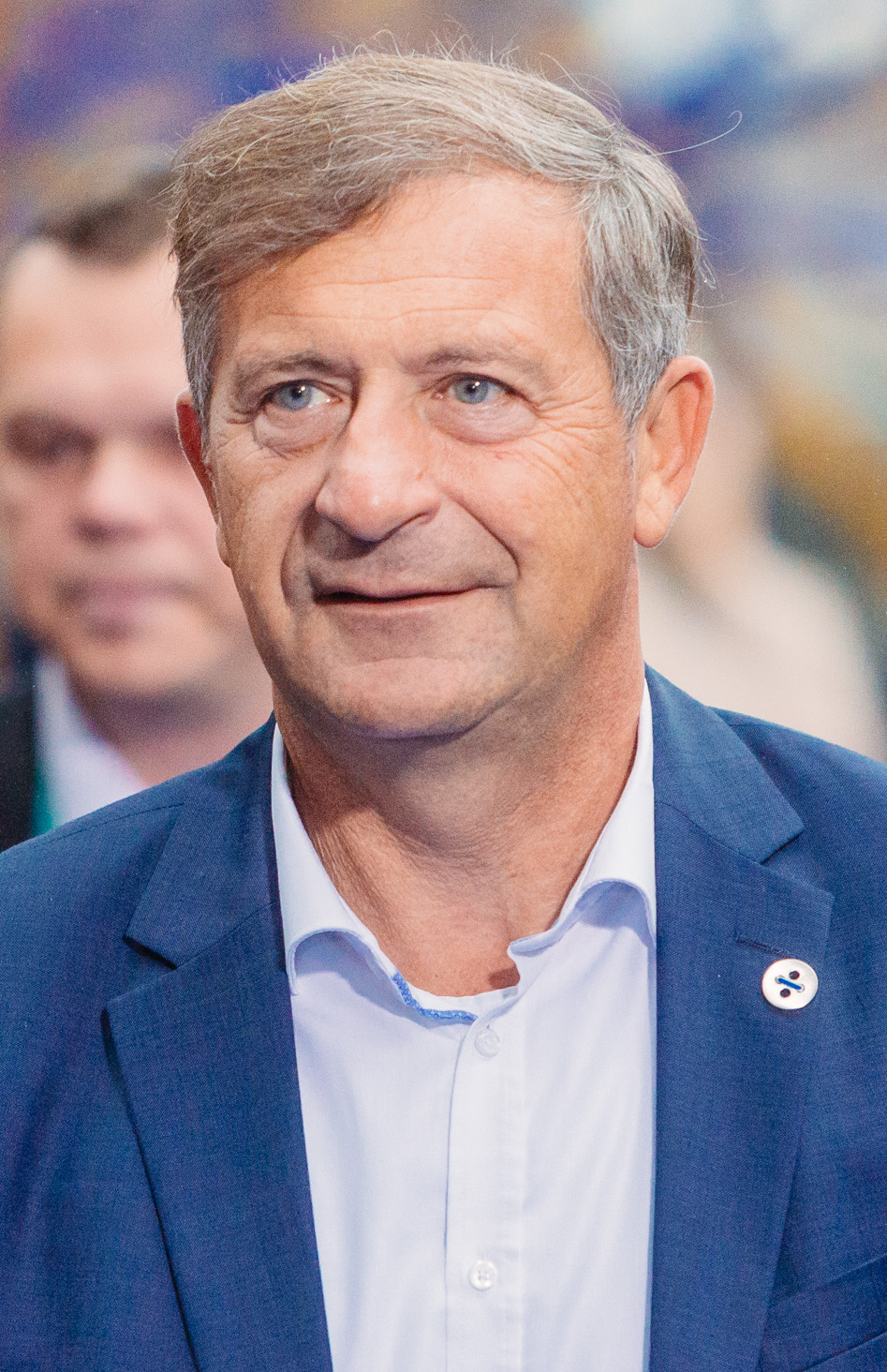
Karl Erjavec (DeSUS)

=== Minister of Economic Development and Technology ===
Ministry of Economic Development and Technology was wanted by both, SMC and SD. Some seen this as a potential reason for Šarec failure to form the government if he will not be able to find the consensus between the parties. In the end SMC got the ministry.

Candidates

Candidates for Minister of Economic Development and Technology

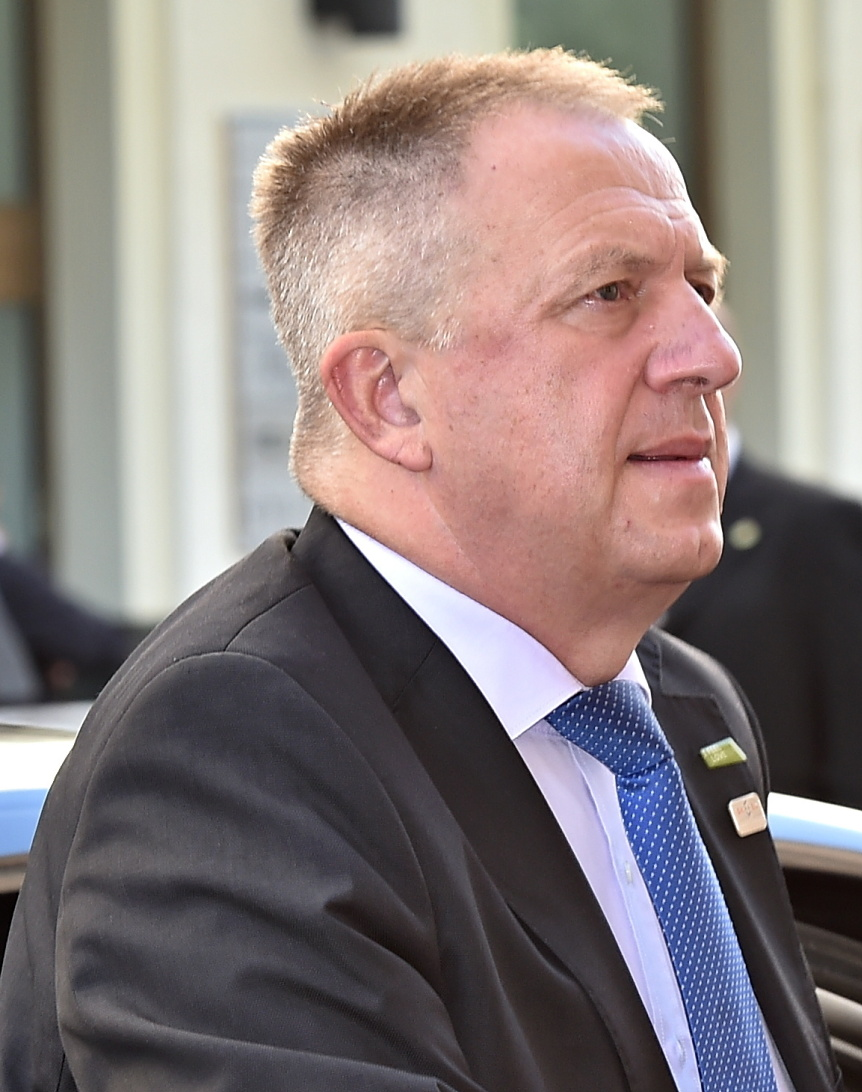
Zdravko Počivalšek (SMC)

=== Minister of Education, Science and Sport ===
SD expressed its will to take over the ministry. At some point it was reported that SMC will take over the ministry, but in the end it was SD, who got the ministry.

Candidates

Candidates for Minister of Education, Science and Sport

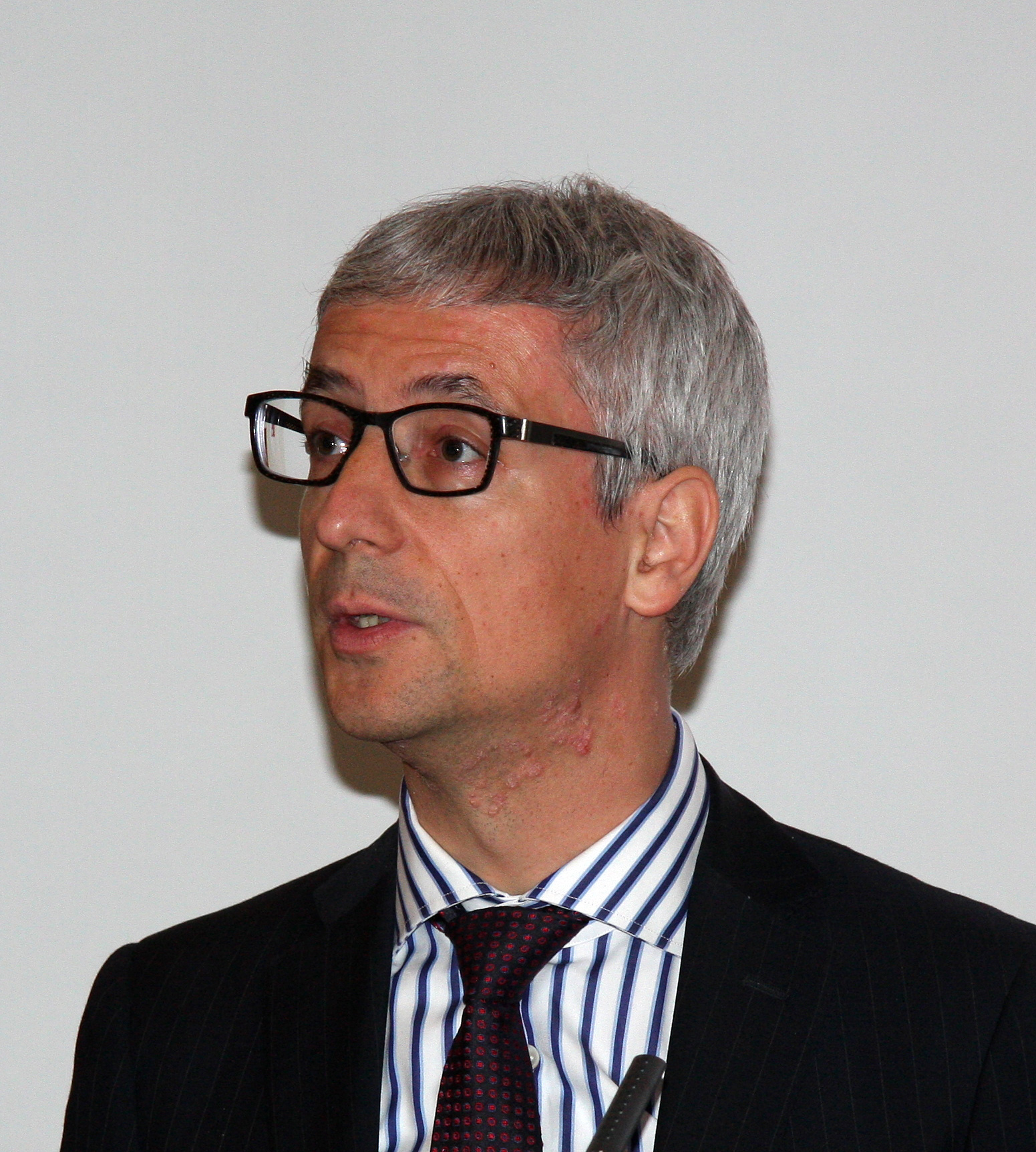
Jernej Pikalo (SD)

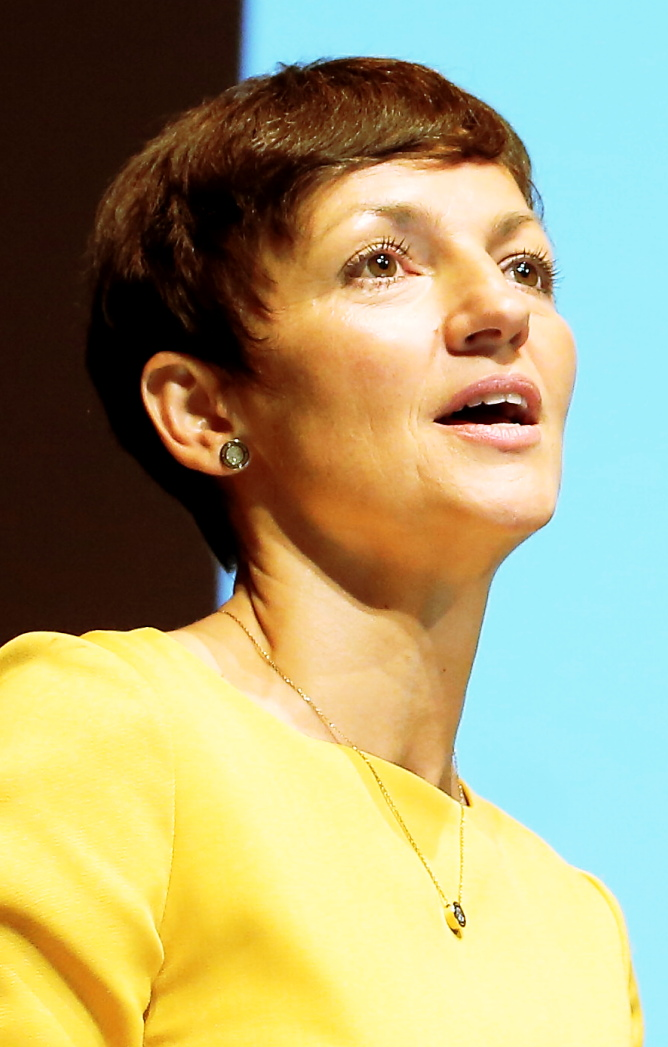
Maja Makovec Brenčič (Ind.)

=== Minister of Environment and Spatial Planning ===
At the beginning it was announced that SAB will take over the ministry, but later leaders of the parties announced that SMC will take it over.

Candidates

Candidates for Minister of Environment and Spatial Planning

Jure Leben (SMC)

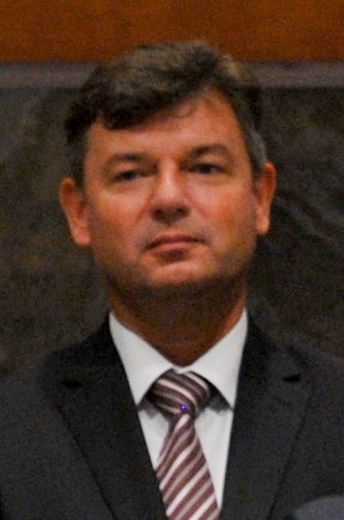
Peter Gašperšič (SMC)

=== Minister of Finance ===
Alenka Bratušek expressed her readiness to take over Ministry of Finance, but later become clear that LMŠ will take the ministry, since they will lead the government. Vojmir Urlep was seen as a candidate at first, but later Marjan Šarec stated that he is satisfied with the work of Mateja Vraničar Erman.

Candidates

Candidates for Minister of Finance

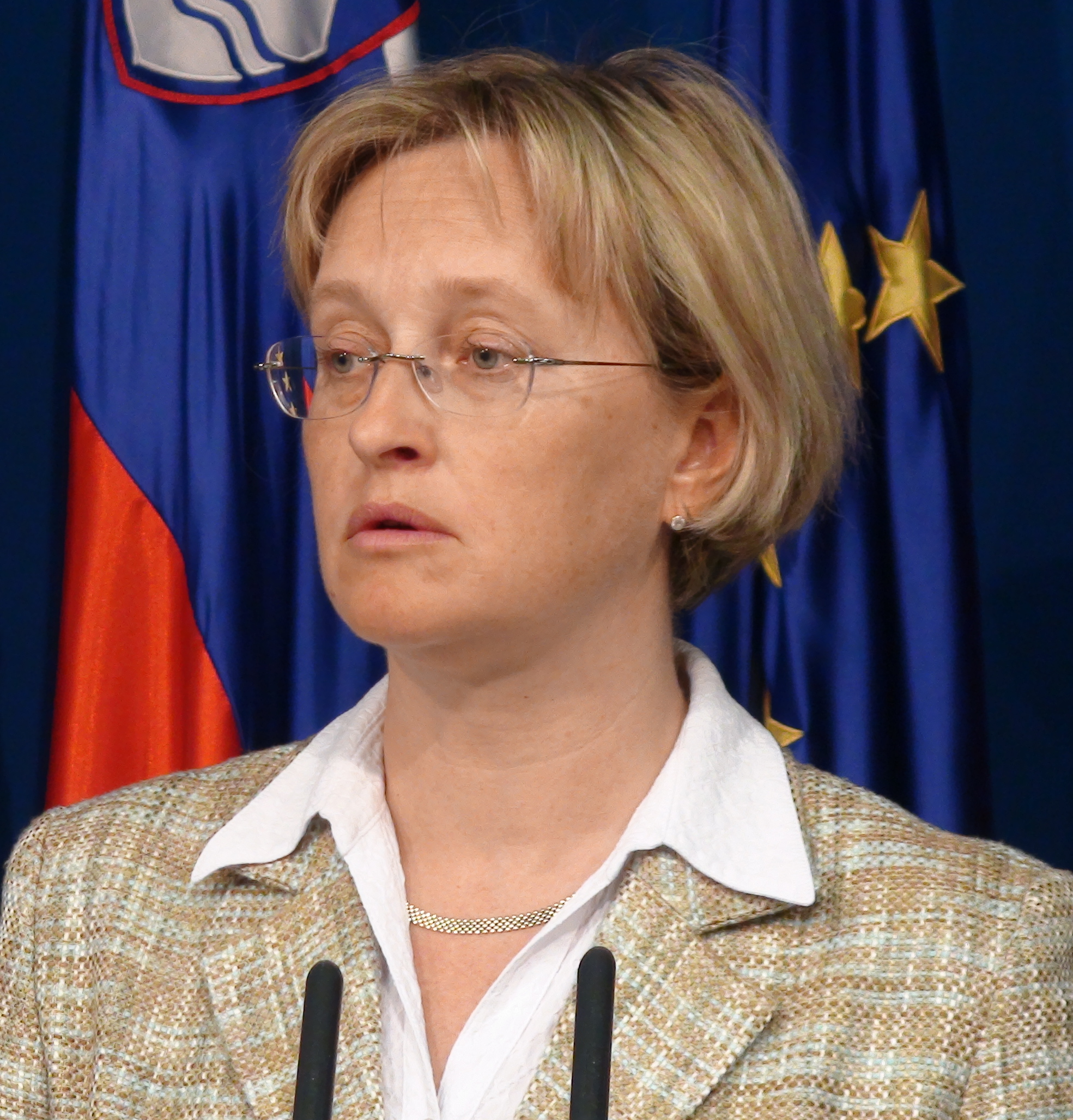
Mateja Vraničar Erman (Ind.)

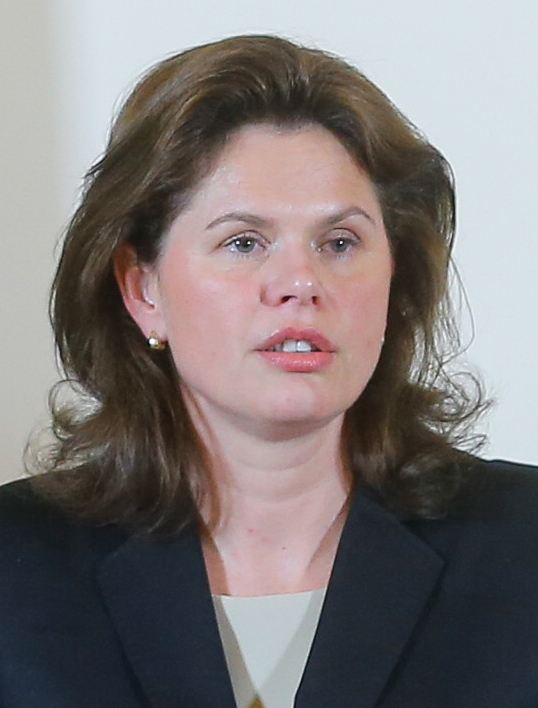
Alenka Bratušek (SAB)

Andrej Bertoncelj (LMŠ)

=== Minister of Foreign Affairs ===
Many have seen Miro Cerar as potential Foreign minister before the election. Cerar declined it at first, since he wanted to become Speaker of the National Assembly. Later it became clear that SD will get the position of the Speaker and that Miro Cerar is willing to take over Ministry of Foreign Affairs.

Candidates

Candidates for Minister of Foreign Affairs

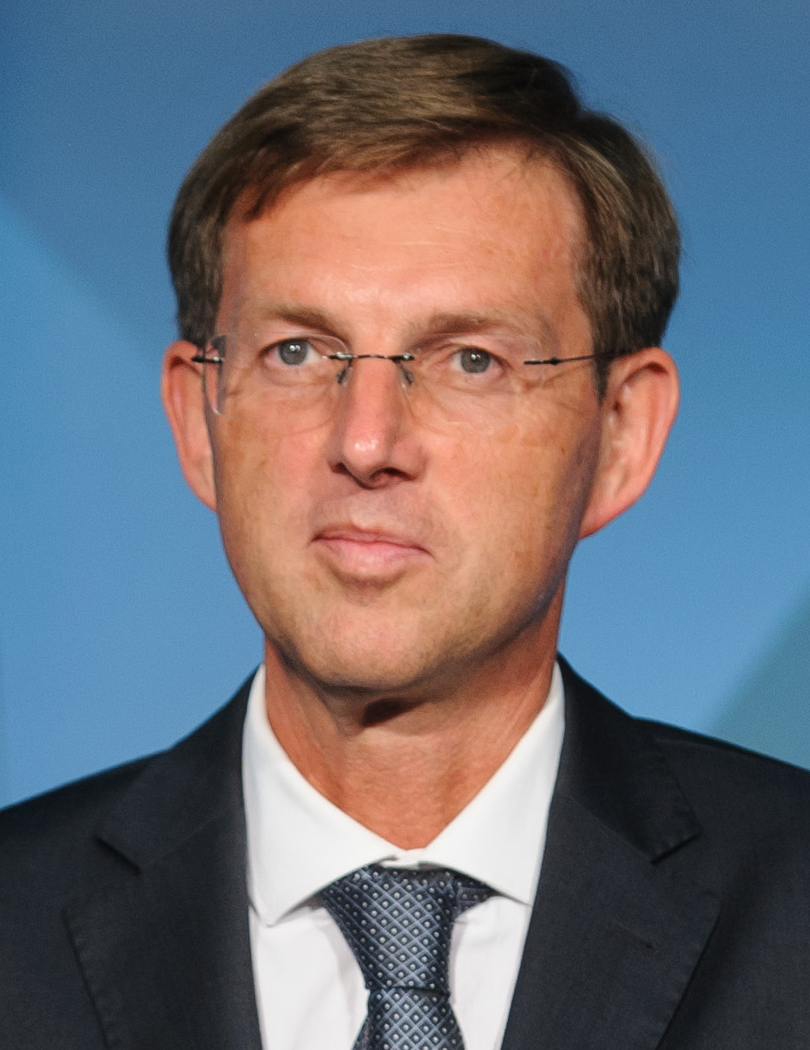
Miro Cerar (SMC)

=== Minister of Health ===
Candidates

Candidates for Minister of Health

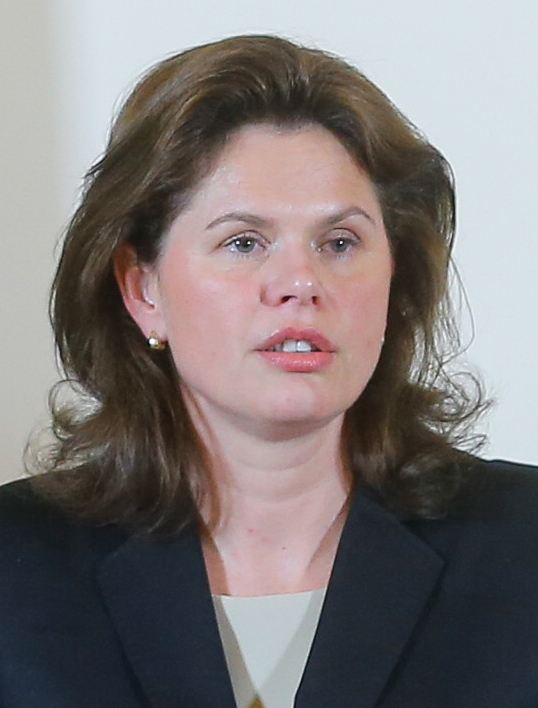
Alenka Bratušek (SAB)

Aleš Šabeder (Ind.)

Samo Fakin (Ind)

Marjan Sušelj (Ind.)

Janez Poklukar (Ind.)

=== Minister of Infrastructure ===
At the beginning of the negotiations, SMC and SD wanted the ministry. In the end SAB got the ministry.

Candidates

Candidates for Minister of Infrastructure

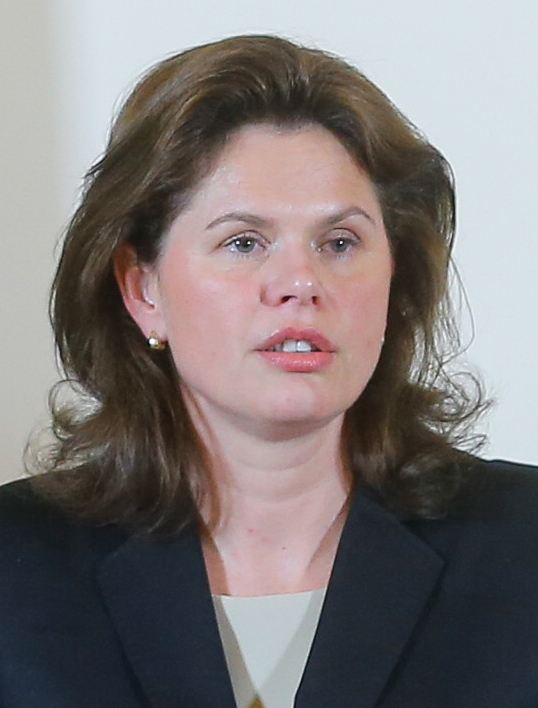
Alenka Bratušek (SAB)

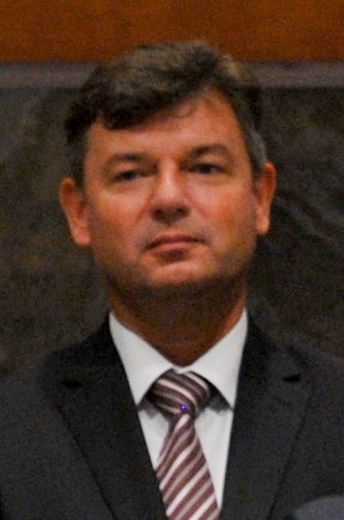
Peter Gašperšič (SMC)

=== Minister of Interior ===
Candidates

Candidates for Minister of Interior

Boštjan Šefic (Ind.)

Boštjan Poklukar (LMŠ)

=== Minister of Justice ===
Candidates

Candidates for Minister of Justice

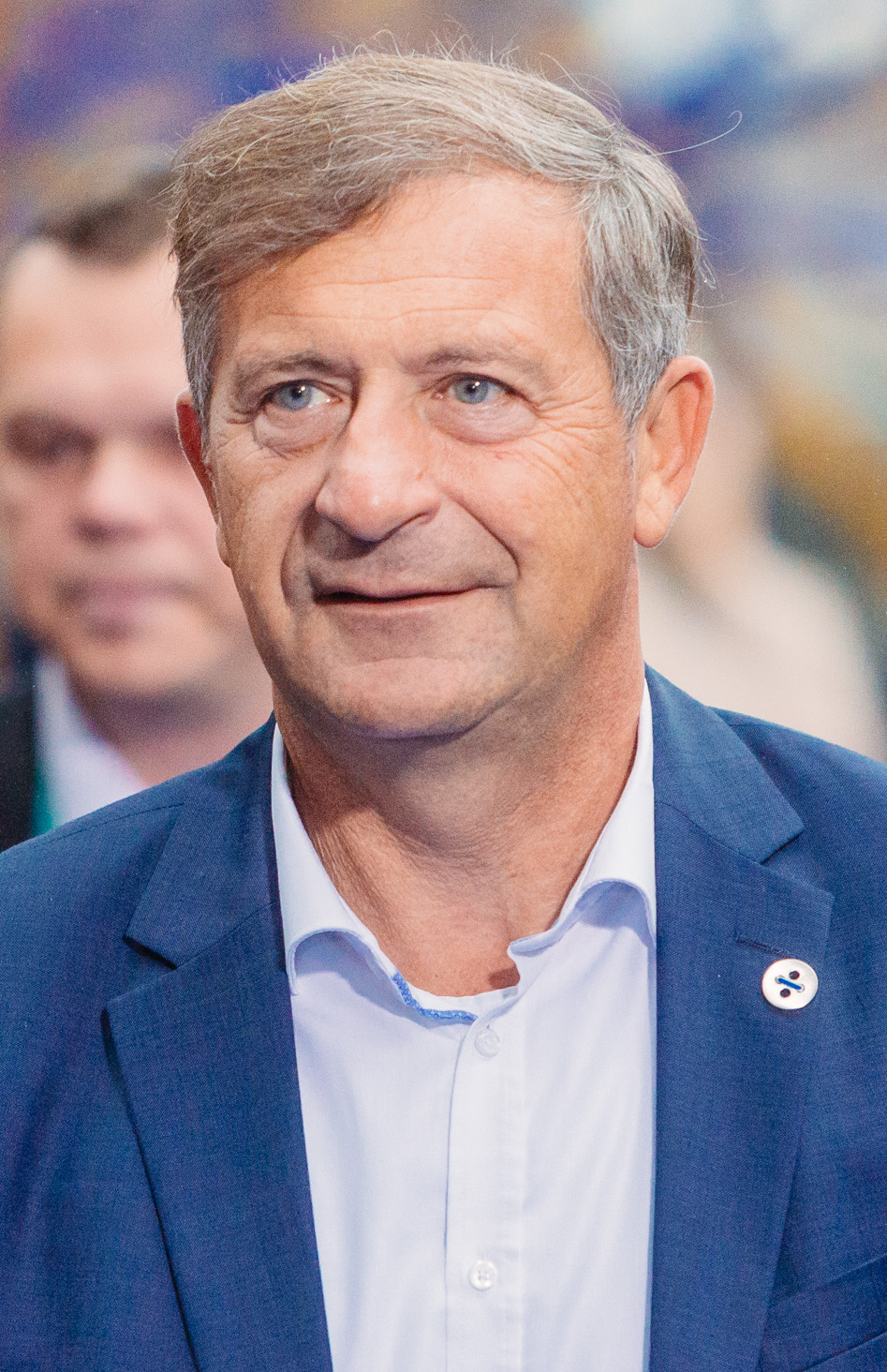
Karl Erjavec (DeSUS)

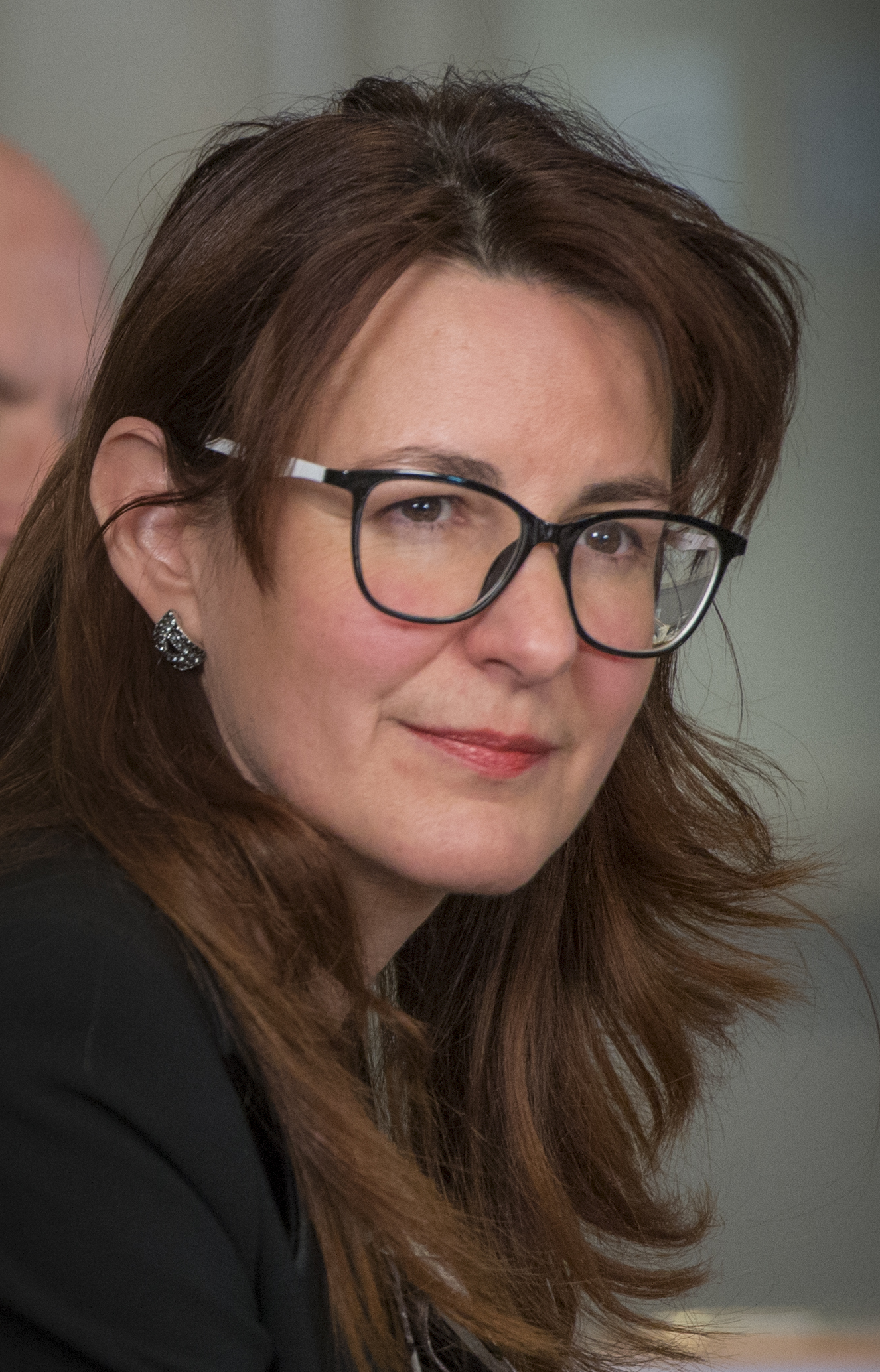
Andreja Katič (SD)

Dominika Švarc Pipan (SD)

=== Minister of Labour, Family, Social Affairs and Equal Opportunities ===
Candidates

Candidates for Minister of Labour, Family, Social Affairs and Equal Opportunities

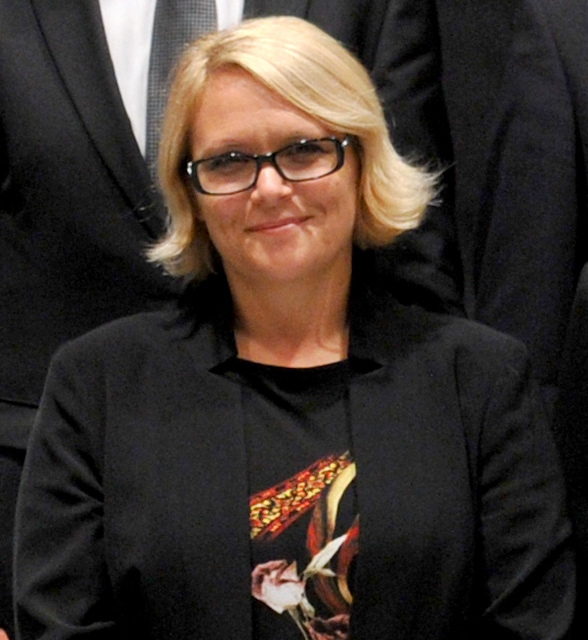
Anja Kopač Mrak (SD)

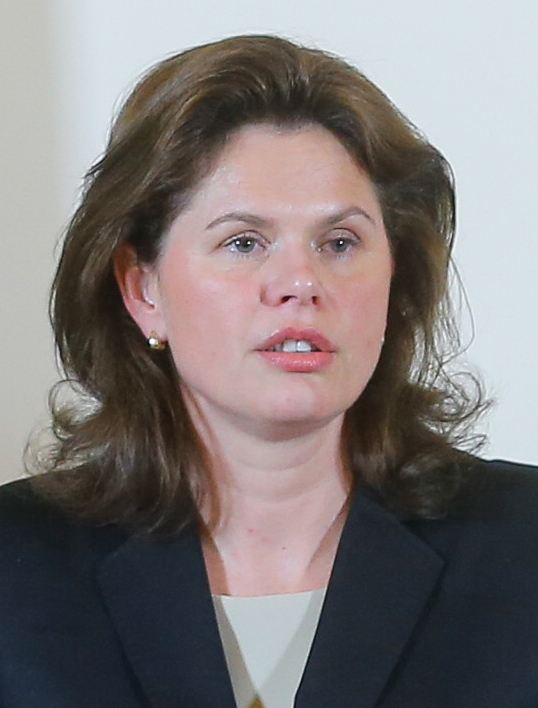
Alenka Bratušek (SAB)

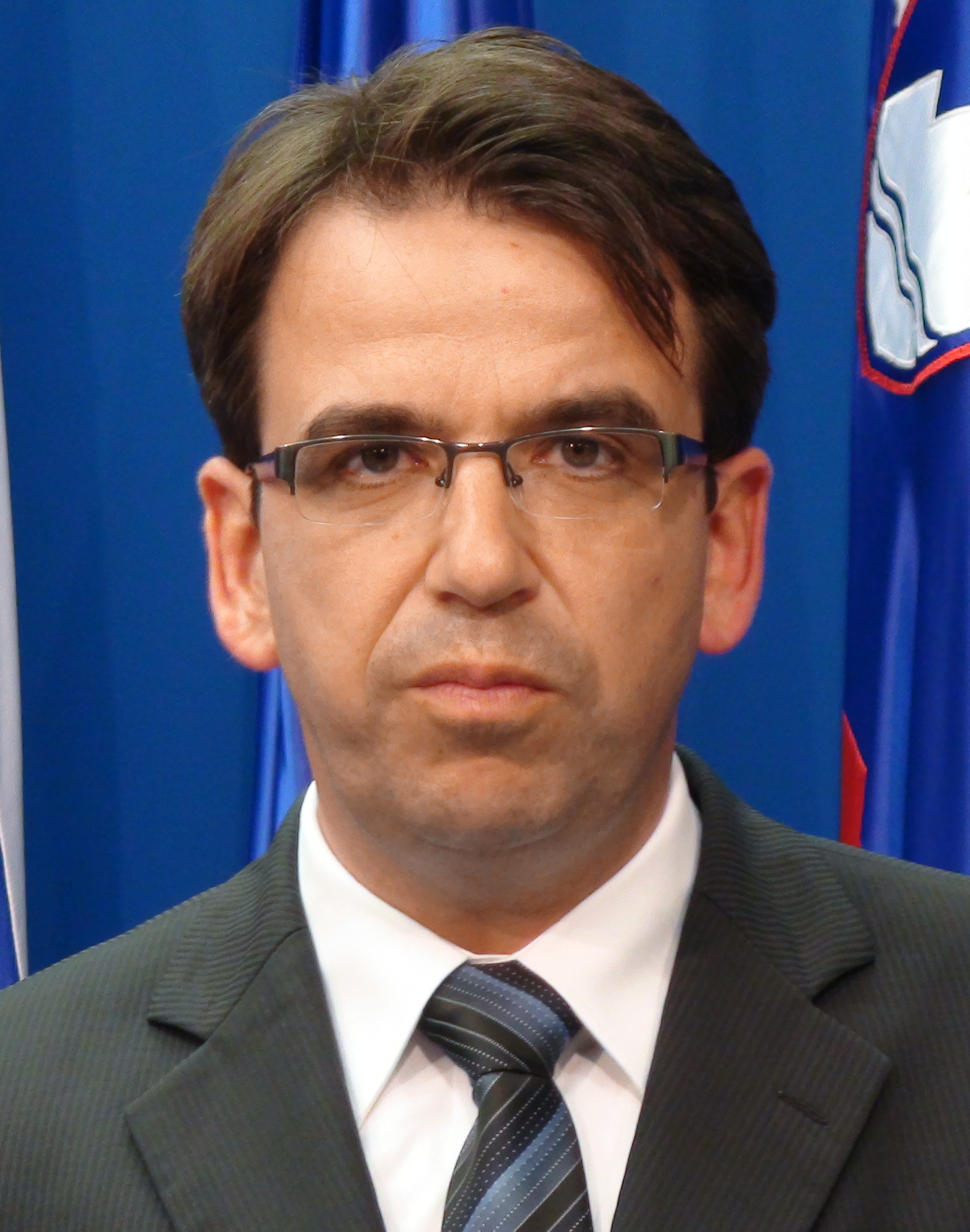
Peter Pogačar (SD)

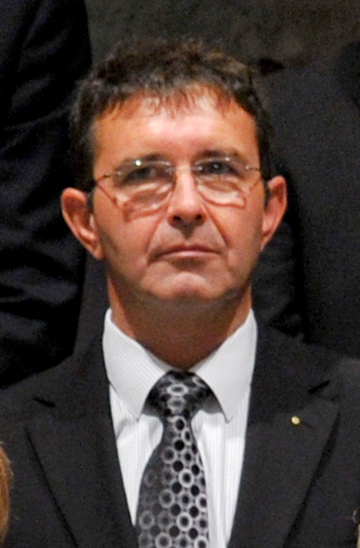
Boris Koprivnikar (SMC)

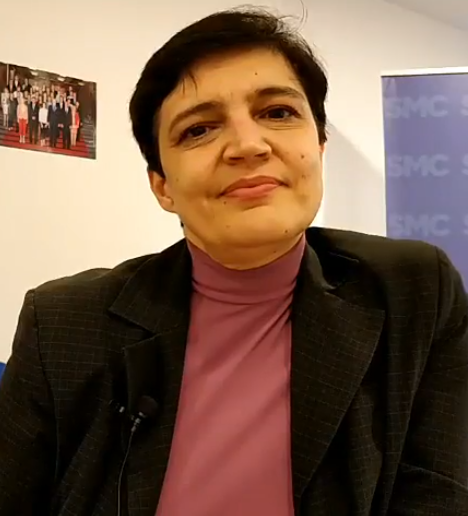
Jasna Murgel (SMC)

Liljana Kozlovič (SMC)

Ksenija Klampfer (SMC)

=== Minister of Public Administration ===
Candidates

Candidates for Minister of Public Administration

Tugomir Kodelja (LMŠ)

=== Minister without portfolio for Slovenian diaspora ===
Candidates

=== Minister without Portfolio responsible for Development, Strategic Projects and Cohesion ===
Candidates

Candidates for Minister of Defence

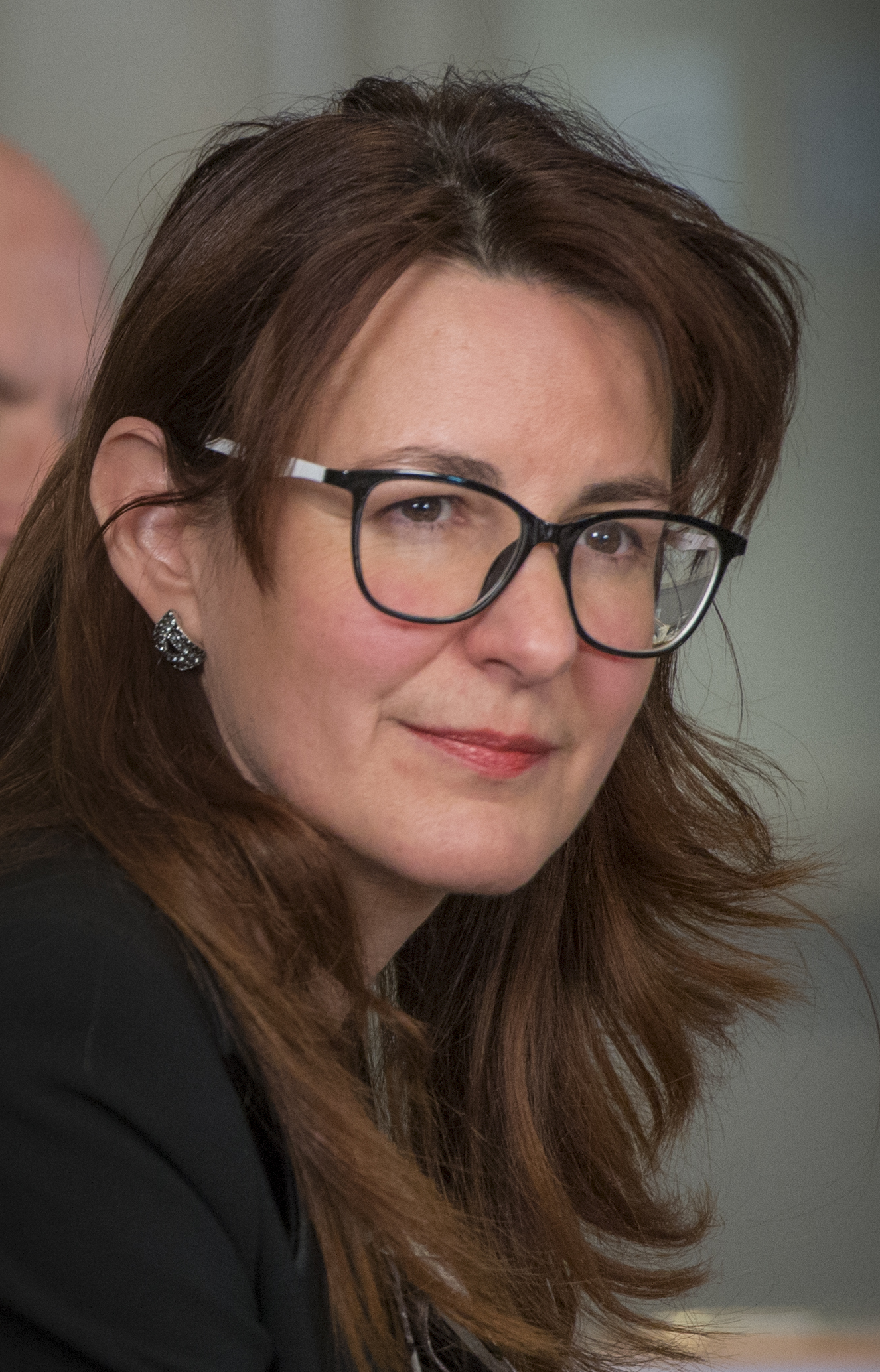
Andreja Katič (SD)

== See also ==
- List of governments of Slovenia
- National Security Council (Slovenia)
