= Alenka Bratušek =

Prime Minister of Slovenia from 2013 to 2014

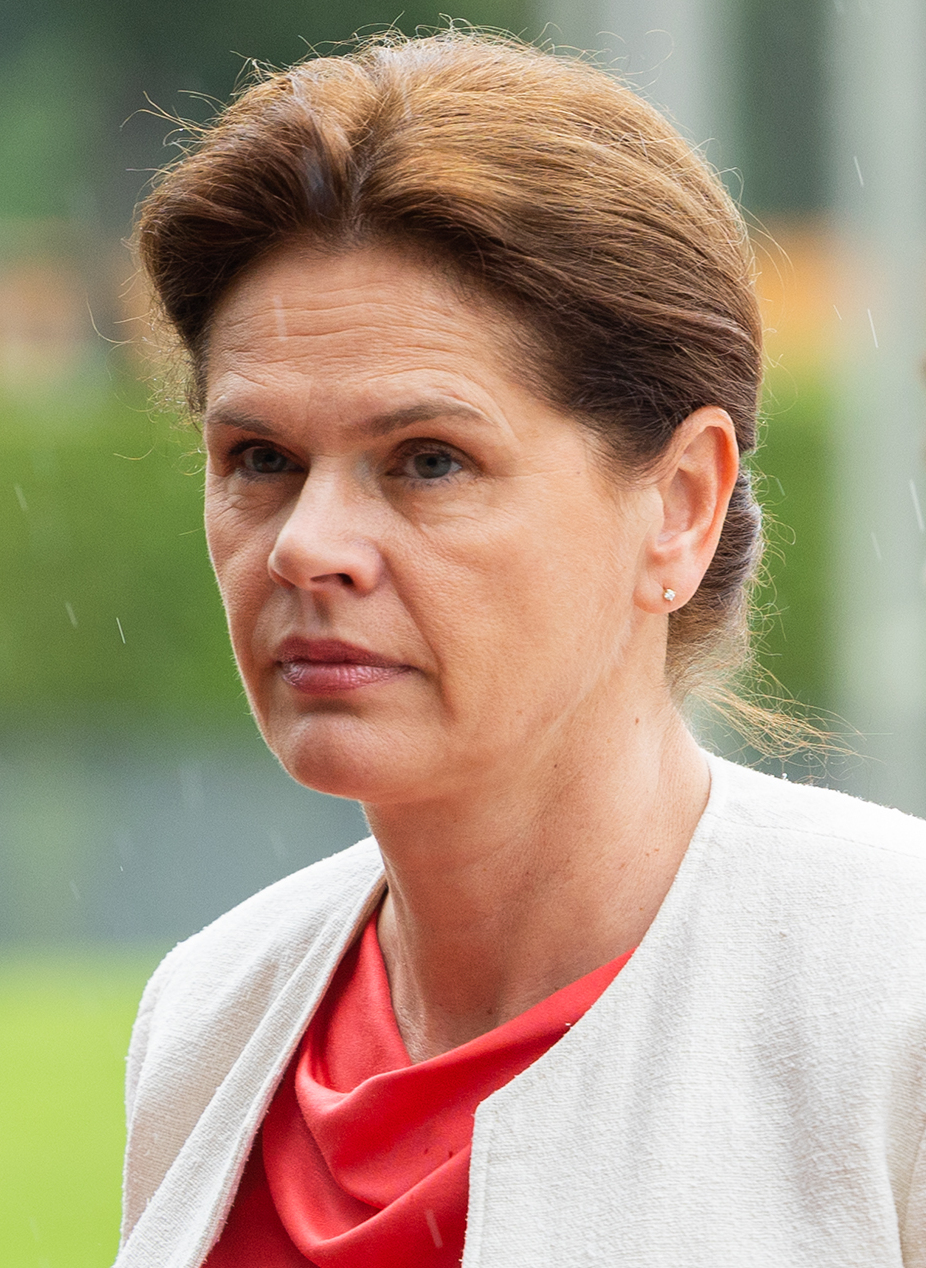
- Bratušek in 2023

Prime Minister of Slovenia
- In office 20 March 2013 – 18 September 2014
- President: Borut Pahor
- Preceded by: Janez Janša
- Succeeded by: Miro Cerar

Deputy Prime Minister of Slovenia
- In office 13 September 2018 – 13 March 2020 Serving with Miro Cerar, Karl Erjavec, Andrej Bertoncelj, & Jernej Pikalo
- Prime Minister: Marjan Šarec
- Preceded by: Karl Erjavec; Dejan Židan; Boris Koprivnikar
- Succeeded by: Zdravko Počivalšek; Matej Tonin; Aleksandra Pivec

Minister of Infrastructure
- In office 24 January 2023 – 4 June 2026
- Prime Minister: Robert Golob
- Preceded by: Bojan Kumer
- Succeeded by: Jernej Vrtovec (Infrastructure and Energy)
- In office 13 September 2018 – 13 March 2020
- Prime Minister: Marjan Šarec
- Preceded by: Peter Gašperšič
- Succeeded by: Jernej Vrtovec

Acting Minister of Natural Resources and Spatial Planning
- In office 9 October 2023 – 7 December 2023
- Prime Minister: Robert Golob
- Preceded by: Uroš Brežan
- Succeeded by: Jože Novak

Leader of Positive Slovenia
- In office 17 January 2013 – 25 April 2014
- Preceded by: Zoran Janković
- Succeeded by: Zoran Janković

Personal details
- Born: 31 March 1970 (age 56) Celje, SR Slovenia, SFR Yugoslavia
- Party: Freedom Movement (2022–present)
- Other political affiliations: Liberal Democracy (2006–2008); Zares (2008–2010); Hermina Krt's List (2010–2011); Positive Slovenia (2011–2014); Party of Alenka Bratušek (2014–2022)
- Education: University of Ljubljana

Alenka Bratušek (Note: Slovene pronunciation: [aˈleːŋka ˈbɾaːtuʃək];) (born 31 March 1970) is a Slovenian politician, who was the Prime Minister of Slovenia from March 2013 until May 2014 as the first woman in Slovenia to hold this position. She was president pro tempore of the Positive Slovenia party from January 2013 until April 2014. On 5 May 2014, Bratušek submitted her resignation as prime minister.

Bratušek took office as Minister of Infrastructure in 2018 and served until 2020. She returned to the role in 2023.

== Life ==
Bratušek was born in Celje. She studied at the Faculty of Natural Sciences and Technology at the University of Ljubljana. Continuing her studies at the University of Ljubljana, she went on to obtain a master's degree in management at the Faculty of Social Sciences. Before entering politics, she served for six years as head of the Directorate for the State Budget at the Ministry of Finance.

In March 2013, an anonymous person criticized Bratušek because she had not cited a source on one page of her master's thesis. Her work has 88 pages with 34 listed sources, but journalists only counted 11 that had been cited; among them were also internal documents of the company Javni gospodarski zavod Brdo, where she was member and later chair of the management board. Slovenske novice journalists also went through her work and wrote that Bratušek plagiarized one page from the work of another author (regarding Gøsta Esping-Andersen's classification of welfare) without proper citation. Her alma mater, the Faculty of Social Sciences, started an investigation regarding alleged plagiarism. The investigating commission concluded that "Bratušek in her master's thesis had used works of other authors contrary to current citation methods, but based on critically evaluation of collected material and sources it can not be expertly and scientifically established that the thesis is not a result of her work."

== Political career ==
In 2006 she ran in local elections on the list of the Liberal Democracy of Slovenia (LDS) and was elected to the Kranj city council. In 2008, Bratušek unsuccessfully ran for Parliament on the list of the Social Liberal party Zares. At the next local elections, in 2010, she switched allegiance, this time to Hermina Krt's List (Lista Hermine Krt) and was once again elected to the Kranj city council. In the 2011 early parliamentary elections, she was elected on the list of the Positive Slovenia party. During her parliamentary tenure she was the chairperson of the parliamentary Committee for Budget Control.

On 17 January 2013, Bratušek was elected as president of the Positive Slovenia party after its leader and founder Zoran Janković temporarily renounced all functions in the party following allegations raised by the official Commission for the Prevention of Corruption report. Also following the report, center-right leader Janez Janša's government received a vote of no confidence.

On 10 September 2014 Bratušek was nominated to be one of the vice-presidents of the European Commission under the Junker Presidency, but her nomination was rejected on 8 October 2014, mostly due to her lack of experience.

=== Prime minister (2013–2014) ===
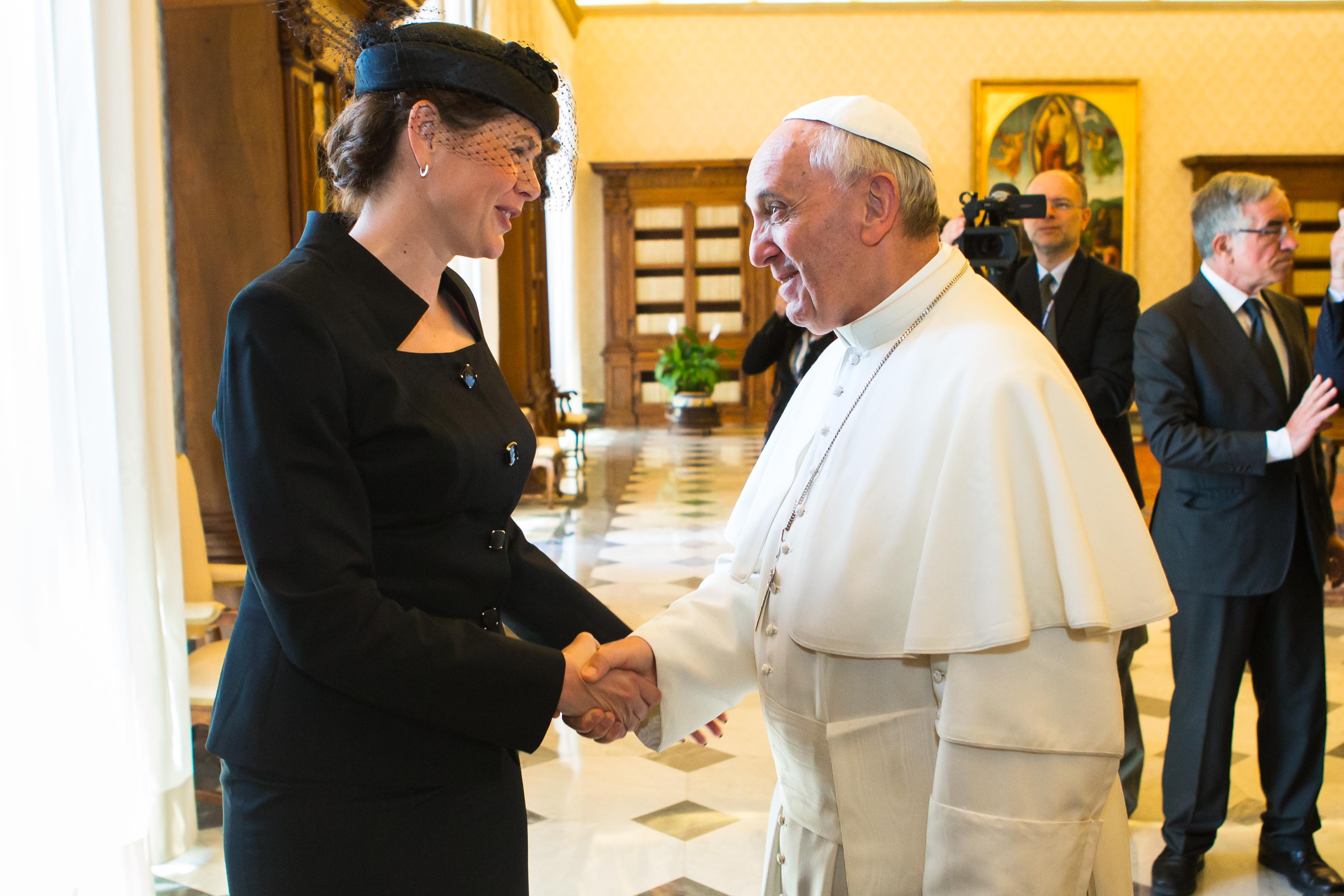
Alenka Bratušek meeting with Pope Francis, 14 June 2013

On 27 February, Bratušek was elected prime minister-designate to form a new government of Slovenia. The center-right Slovenian Democratic Party responded by tweeting about "her government lasting no longer than her skirt's length". (In the event, Alenka Bratušek served as prime minister from March 2013 until April 2014.) Gregor Virant welcomed the outcome of the vote, stating that it would enable Slovenia to move forward. Foreign media thought that it would be difficult for Bratušek to form a new government and questioned whether she would continue with the reforms initiated by Janša's government.

A new parliamentary majority, formed by PS and the Social Democrats, was formed. On 20 March, Bratušek formed a government. During her tenure, she presided over the construction of the first mosque in the country.

In seeking to avoid a financial bailout, her government won a vote of confidence by 50 to 31 on 15 November.

On 29 April 2014, she resigned from Positive Slovenia, after losing the party leadership to Zoran Janković on 26 April. Following this development, Bratušek announced her resignation as prime minister, to take effect on 5 May 2014. On 5 May, she officially submitted her resignation letter, triggering discussions about a snap election later in 2014. She became the first Slovenian prime minister to resign from office; her resignation took effect on 8 May.

On 31 May 2014 she formed her own party Alliance of Alenka Bratušek (Zavezništvo Alenke Bratušek; ZaAB). At the following election in July, ZaAB won four seats in the National Assembly, including one for Bratušek.

=== European Commission ===
In her final days as prime minister, Bratušek nominated herself for the position of Vice-President of the European Commission under the Juncker Presidency, but on 8 October 2014, following a difficult confirmation hearing before the European Parliament, her nomination was rejected, with 122 out of 135 votes against her nomination. Slovenian Prime Minister Miro Cerar nominated another applicant, Slovenian entrepreneur Violeta Bulc.

== Personal life ==
Bratušek lives with her partner in Kranj. She has a son and a daughter. Her son, Oskar Cvjetičanin, is a footballer and plays for Southampton academy.

== Notes ==
Party political offices
Preceded by Zoran Janković	Leader of Positive Slovenia; 2013–2014	Succeeded by Zoran Janković
Political offices
Preceded by Janez Janša	Prime Minister of Slovenia; 2013–2014	Succeeded by Miro Cerar
