= Miro Cerar =

Prime Minister of Slovenia from 2014 to 2018

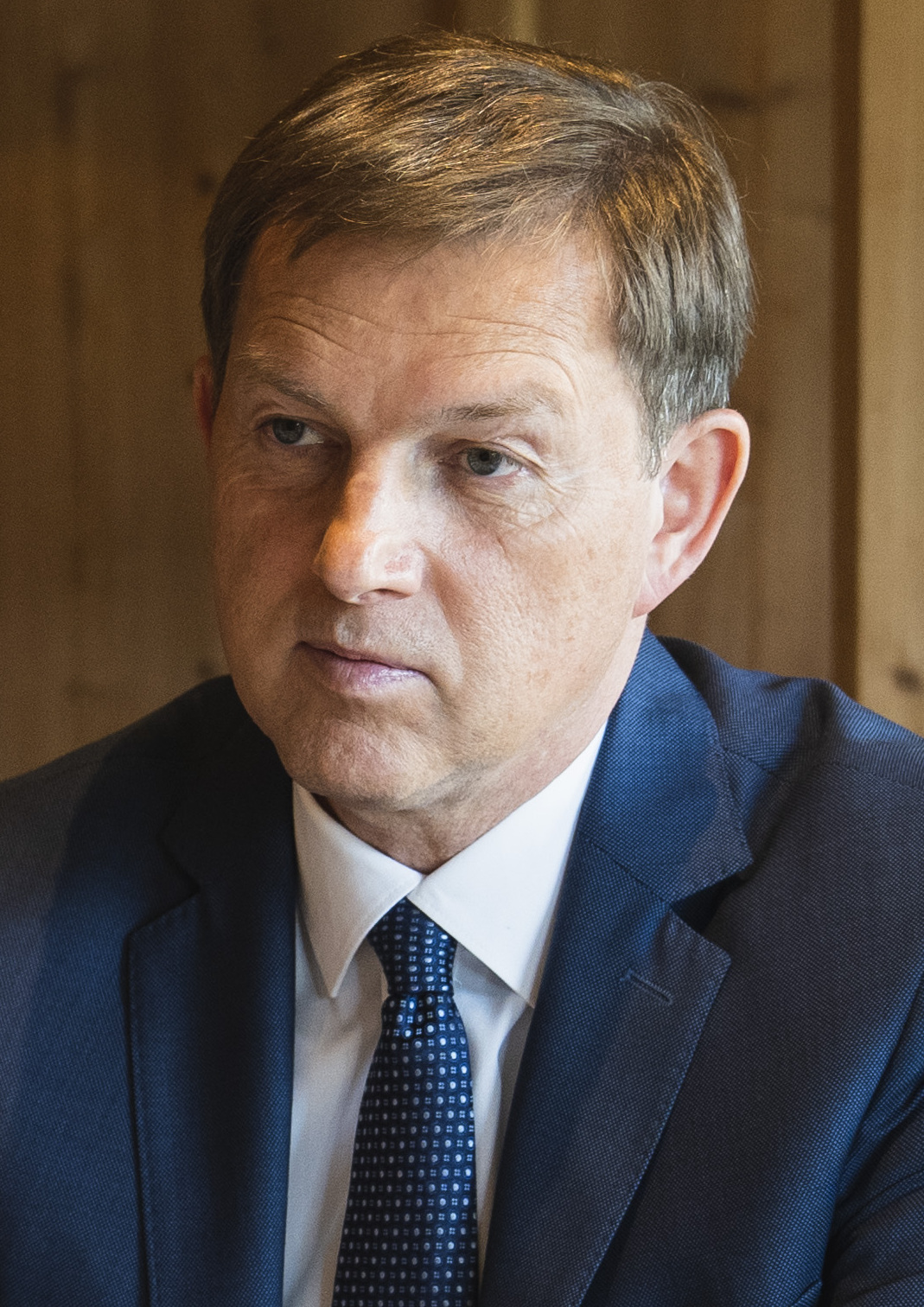
- Cerar in 2019

Prime Minister of Slovenia
- In office 18 September 2014 – 13 September 2018
- President: Borut Pahor
- Preceded by: Alenka Bratušek
- Succeeded by: Marjan Šarec

Deputy Prime Minister of Slovenia
- In office 13 September 2018 – 13 March 2020 Serving with Alenka Bratušek, Karl Erjavec, Andrej Bertoncelj and Jernej Pikalo
- Prime Minister: Marjan Šarec
- Preceded by: Boris Koprivnikar; Dejan Židan
- Succeeded by: Zdravko Počivalšek; Matej Tonin; Aleksandra Pivec

Minister of Foreign Affairs
- In office 13 September 2018 – 13 March 2020
- Prime Minister: Marjan Šarec
- Preceded by: Karl Erjavec
- Succeeded by: Anže Logar

Member of the National Assembly
- In office 1 August 2014 – 13 March 2020

Leader of the Modern Centre Party
- In office 2 June 2014 – 21 September 2019
- Preceded by: Office established
- Succeeded by: Zdravko Počivalšek

Personal details
- Born: 25 August 1963 (age 63) Ljubljana, Yugoslavia (now Slovenia)
- Party: Independent (until 2014); Modern Centre Party (2014–2020); Independent (after 2020)
- Education: University of Ljubljana (BLL, MLL, PhD); University of California, Berkeley

Miroslav Cerar Jr. (Slovene pronunciation: [ˈmíːɾɔslaw ˈtsɛ̀ːɾaɾ], known as Miro Cerar [ˈmíːrɔ -];) (born 25 August 1963) is a Slovenian law professor and politician. He was Prime Minister of Slovenia, leading the 12th Government. He served as Deputy Prime Minister and Minister of Foreign Affairs in the 13th Government. He is a full professor at the Chair of Theory and Sociology of Law at the University of Ljubljana Faculty of Law.

Cerar was born on 25 August 1963. After graduating in law, he was employed by the Ljubljana Faculty of Law. In the late 1980s, he actively participated in the efforts for the democratisation and state independence of Slovenia. In 1990 and 1991, he participated in drafting the Basic Constitutional Charter on the Sovereignty and Independence of the Republic of Slovenia and the Constitution of the Republic of Slovenia. Between 1992 and 2014, he was a lecturer at the Faculty of Law of Ljubljana University, and an external adviser to the National Assembly of the Republic of Slovenia for constitutional and other legal matters. In 2008, as a Fulbright Fellow, he lectured on comparative constitutional law at the Golden Gate University School of Law in San Francisco and pursued post-doctoral studies at the University of California School of Law at Berkeley. Before entering politics in 2014, he was known as a jurist and intellectual specialising in the interpretation of constitutionality and the legality of the operation of state authorities. He advocated the rule of law, constitutional democracy, improved legal culture and higher ethical standards in the society. In the 2000–2018 period, in the annual polls conducted by the Ius Software portal (iusinfo.si), he ranked among ten most influential Slovenian lawyers 17 times, and in the 2011–2014 period, users of the Tax Fin-Lex portal voted him the most influential Slovenian legal expert four times.

In 2014, he entered politics, established the Miro Cerar Party (SMC) and was elected prime minister after his party won the parliamentary elections. After a number of crisis years, his coalition government (2014–2018) managed to stabilise the political situation and lead the country out of the financial-economic crisis. The government consolidated public finances, adopted a state asset management strategy and gradually abandoned the austerity measures. The government encouraged rapid economic recovery and stable economic growth, and started allocating more resources to all social areas. These and some other measures made it possible for Slovenia to correct excessive macroeconomic imbalances, which had persisted after 2011. In 2015 and 2016, in cooperation with local communities and NGOs, Cerar's government managed to secure the humane and safe treatment and transit of approximately half a million migrants across the Slovenian territory.

From 2018 to 2020, Cerar was Deputy Prime Minister and Minister of Foreign Affairs of the Republic of Slovenia. By ensuring balanced foreign policy and good neighbourly relations, he intensified cooperation with the EU core countries, with pronounced relations with Benelux, and the United States. He advocated Slovenia's greater opening up into the world. Among his priorities were economic diplomacy, sustainable development, rule of law, human rights, humanitarian action, and multilateralism. He was among the most ardent European promoters of the EU enlargement to the Western Balkans.

== Early life and education ==
Miro Cerar was born on 25 August 1963 in Ljubljana. He is the father of three children.

He grew up with his sisters in Ljubljana and Grosuplje. His father Miroslav Cerar (born in 1939) is a multiple European, world, and Olympic pommel horse champion (he also won medals in other gymnastic disciplines), and after the end of his sports career, he worked as a lawyer until his retirement. He is a founding member and active official of the Olympic Committee of Slovenia. Cerar's mother Zdenka Cerar (née Prusnik, 1941–2013) was a national gymnastics champion in her youth, and later, when she worked as a lawyer, she served as State Prosecutor General and Minister of Justice.

Cerar started attending Prule Primary School in 1970 and enrolled in Ivan Cankar Grammar School in Ljubljana in 1978. From 1982 to 1983, he did his compulsory military service in today's Podgorica (formerly Titograd, Montenegro), and started studying law in 1983.

In 1983, Cerar enrolled in the Faculty of Law in Ljubljana, and graduated in 1987. In 1987, he received the Slavko Zore Prize awarded by the United Nations Association of Slovenia for his bachelor's thesis Legal Protection of Trademarks (advisor: Krešimir Puharič). Upon graduation, he was employed as a teaching assistant at the Theory of Law Department at the Faculty of Law in Ljubljana.

== Academic career ==
In the late 1980s, Cerar published a number of research articles and popular science articles, and started asserting himself as a critical legal thinker in the Slovenian public. In 1988, he was one of the authors of the book Pravni memorandum: Vojaški tožilec versus Borštner, Janša, Tasić, Zavrl (Legal Memorandum: Military Prosecutor vs. Borštner, Janša, Tasič, Zavrl), and in 1989 he participated in writing Pravni memorandum: Svoboda združevanja (Legal Memorandum: Freedom of Association). Both books called for the enforcement of the rule of law and democratic values, particularly in the light of the then non-democratic pressures of the regime on the democratisation process in Slovenia.

Between 1993 and 1999, he was a correspondent of the Center for the Study of Constitutionalism in Eastern Europe (based at the New York University School of Law, and previously at the University of Chicago Law School and Central European University in Budapest), and he contributed periodic reports on the development of constitutionalism in Slovenia to the East European Constitutional Review.

In 1993, he obtained his master's degree from the University of Ljubljana's Faculty of Law with the thesis The Multidimensional Nature of Human Rights and Duties, and in 1999 his doctoral degree from the same faculty with the dissertation (Ir)rationality of Modern Law. In 2000, he was appointed an assistant professor at the Faculty of Law; in 2005, he became an associate professor, and in 2011, he became a full professor. His areas of expertise included the theory and philosophy of law, comparative law, constitutional law, and the ethics of legal professions. He also lectured on the basics of law at the Faculty of Social Sciences at the University of Ljubljana (2006–2014), and on the theory of law and state at the University of Maribor's Faculty of Law (1995–1998). From 2002 to 2014, he annually delivered a set of lectures on basic legal concepts for translation students (specialising in German). In the 2011–2012 academic year, the University of Ljubljana's Student Council voted him the best teacher at the Faculty of Law.

From 1989 to 2004, he was a mentor in the Legal Aid Service for Students, established by the University of Ljubljana's Student Organisation, where students from the Ljubljana Faculty of Law provided free legal assistance in study-related matters to other students.

From 1994 to 2003, he was an external evaluator for the leaving exam subject in law. Between 1994 and 2014, he lectured on constitutional topics as part of the specialised training programme for state administration employees. From 2009 to 2012 he was chair of the examination committee for the state bar exam, and an examiner in constitutional arrangement, organisation of the justice system, and state administration, as well as the foundations of the EU legal order.

From 2003 to 2014, he was vice president of the Slovenian Association for Legal and Social Philosophy.

For six months in 2008, as a Fulbright Fellow, he taught comparative constitutional law at the Golden Gate University School of Law in San Francisco and pursued post-doctoral studies at the University of California School of Law at Berkeley.

From 1990 to 1992, he was a member of the editorial board of Časopis za kritiko znanosti (Journal for the Critique of Science). From 1995 to 2014, he was an editor of the research journal Zbornik znanstvenih razprav at the Faculty of Law at the University of Ljubljana. From 2003 to 2014, he was a member of the editorial board of the Manet research series of the Ljubljana Faculty of Law, and from 2003 to 2006 a member of the editorial board of the magazine Revus (covering European constitutionality) published by GV Revije. From 2002 to 2014, he was a member of the editorial board of the journal Theory and Practice published by the Faculty of Social Sciences in Ljubljana, and of the book series Legal Horizons issued by Cankarjeva Založba in Ljubljana.

Between 2009 and 2013, he was a member of the Expert Board for Scientific Books and Journals at the Slovenian Book Agency, acting particularly as a reviewer of diverse social science contributions.

From 2000 to 2018, in the annual polls conducted by the Ius Software portal (iusinfo.si), he ranked among the ten most influential Slovenian lawyers 17 times, and from 2011 to 2014 users of the Tax-Fin-Lex portal voted him the most influential Slovenian legal expert four times.

=== Constitutional and advisory roles ===
In June 1990, Cerar, together with Peter Jambrek, Lojze Ude, and other experts, participated in drafting the initial proposal for launching the procedure for the adoption of a new Slovenian constitution put forth by the Presidency of the Republic of Slovenia. As an expert assistant, he coordinated the work of a 7-member expert group (members: Franc Grad, Tine Hribar, Peter Jambrek, Tone Jerovšek, Matevž Krivic, Anton Perenič, and Lojze Ude), which prepared a working draft of a new Slovenian constitution at Podvin Castle in August 1990.

Between 1991 and 1992, he was Secretary of the Constitutional Commission of the Assembly of the Republic of Slovenia. In the same period, he also participated in drafting the following constitutional and legislative proposals: Amendments 99 and 100 to the then Constitution of the Republic of Slovenia; Basic Constitutional Charter on the Sovereignty and Independence of the Republic of Slovenia and the constitutional act for its implementation (25 June 1991); Constitution of the Republic of Slovenia and the constitutional act for its implementation (23 December 1991); and acts governing the elections into the National Assembly and the National Council, and presidential elections (1992).

In the periods 1993–2007 and 2009–2014, Cerar served as an external adviser to the National Assembly of the Republic of Slovenia for constitutional and legal matters, regularly coordinating the work of expert groups drafting opinions and constitutional amendments for the Constitutional Commission of the National Assembly. From the adoption of the Constitution (1991) to the moment he entered politics (2014), he participated in all discussions on constitutional amendments.

He contributed to opinions on various constitutional and legal matters, particularly related to the electoral and wider political system, referendums, immunity of deputies, and parliamentary rules of procedure. He was a member of expert groups tasked with the preparation of changes to rules of procedure and with the English translation of the Constitution, other constitutional acts, and the Rules of Procedure of the National Assembly. He advised the Legal Service of the National Assembly, Secretariat General, Office of the President of the National Assembly, and Constitutional Commission.

After having served as deputy president since 2009, Cerar acted as president of the Judicial Council between 2010 and 2012. In this capacity, he participated in the procedures for the election, appointment, and discharge of judges and presidents of the courts, and those related to the promotion of judges, the immunity of judges and the incompatibility of the functions, disciplinary procedures against judges, and other procedures falling under the competence of the Judicial Council.

He participated in several expert meetings with high representatives of judicial councils of European countries. As Slovenian representative to the European Network of Councils for the Judiciary (ENCJ), Cerar participated in the ENCJ project group tasked with establishing the level of public trust in the judiciary at the national and supranational levels in the 2010–2011 period, and in the 2011–2012 period in the ENCJ working group on judicial reform in Europe.

== Political career ==
On 13 February 2013, Cerar refused the offer by the then majority parliamentary coalition to assume the office of Prime Minister, claiming that the parliamentary parties did not provide the necessary foundations for successfully overcoming the social crisis (later, the coalition parties elected Alenka Bratušek as Prime Minister). In the months that followed, Cerar brought together a group of like-minded individuals with whom on 2 June 2014 he formed a central social-liberal party called the Miro Cerar Party (SMC), just six weeks before an early parliamentary election. The party manifesto focused on different measures to overcome the crisis underlining human dignity, the rule of law, improved political culture and sustainable development.

Cerar was elected deputy and his party took 34.5% of the vote (36 seats, the biggest number of deputies of a single party at that time) thus claiming electoral victory. On 25 August, the National Assembly elected Cerar as Prime Minister. He formed a centre-left coalition and began his term on 17 September. On 21 November 2014, SMC joined the ALDE European political group (the Alliance of Liberals and Democrats for Europe), and in March 2015 the party was renamed the Party of the Modern Centre (SMC) on the initiative of Cerar.

=== Prime minister of Slovenia (2014–2018) ===
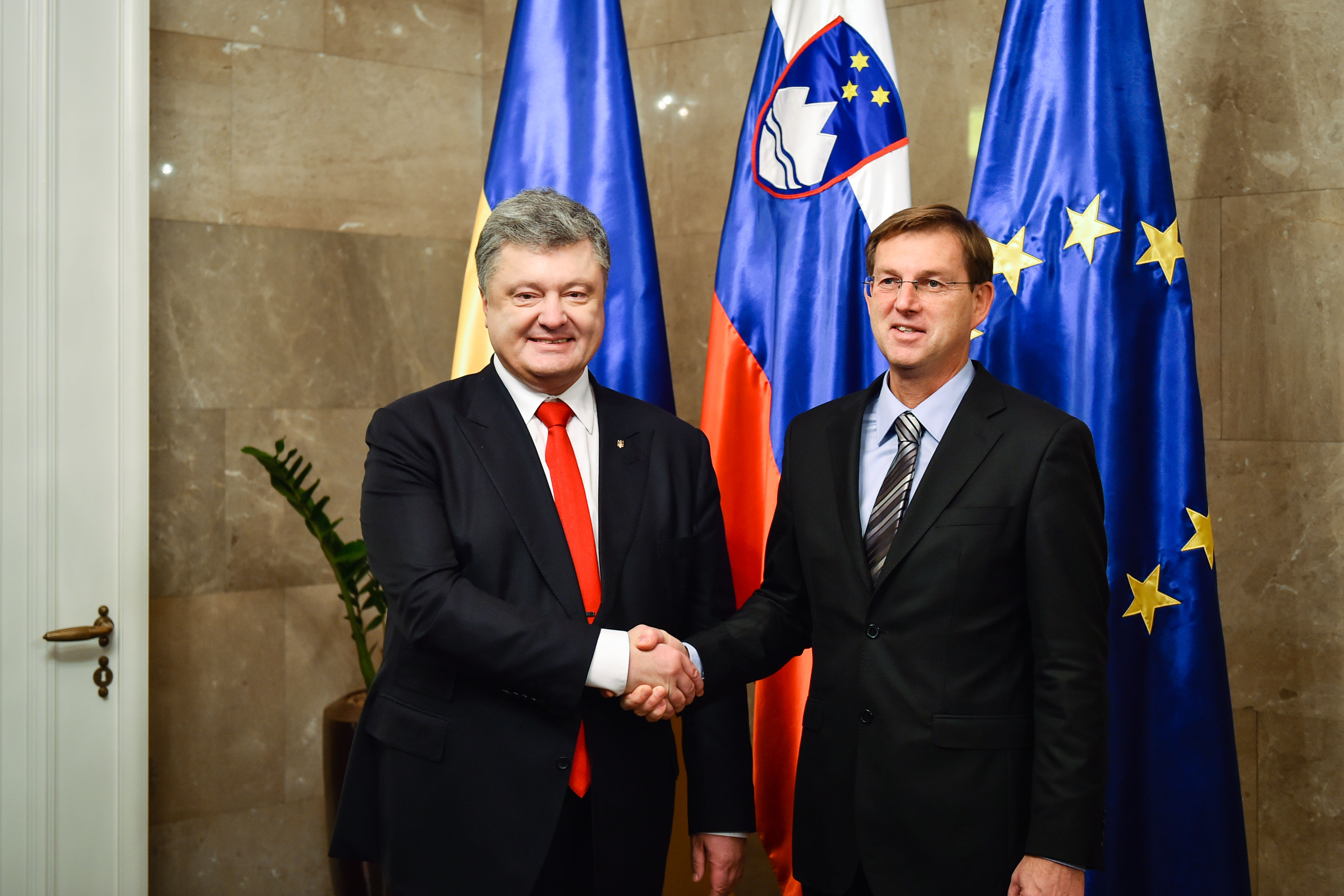
Cerar with Ukrainian President Petro Poroshenko, 8 November 2016

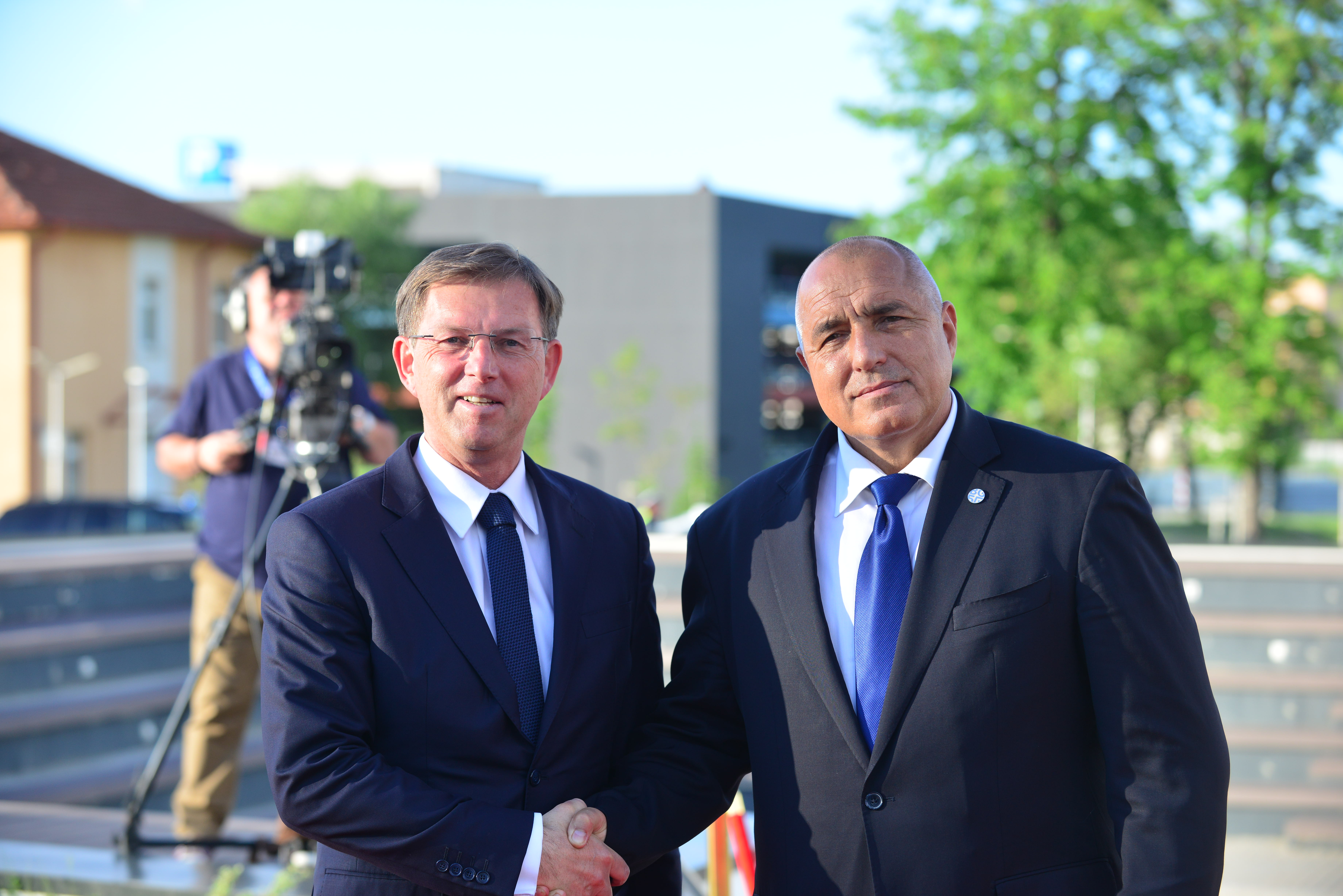
Cerar with Bulgarian Prime Minister Boyko Borisov in Sofia, 16 May 2018

The 12th Slovenian Government was formed with a coalition of three parties: SMC (9 ministers, some of whom were not members of the party), the Social Democrats – SD (3 ministers) and the Democratic Party of Pensioners of Slovenia – Desus (4 ministers); this was the first Slovenian Government comprising an equal number of female and male ministers throughout its term of office.

After several years of turmoil, this Government managed to stabilise the political situation leading the country out of the financial and economic crisis. The Government consolidated the public finances and gradually loosened the austerity measures. The country experienced a rapid economic recovery with a stable and relatively high economic growth and a considerable drop in unemployment, particularly among the young population. The Government gradually increased the funds for all areas of social life. These and other measures and institutional changes helped Slovenia correct the macroeconomic imbalances, recorded since 2011, for which it was publicly also commended by the European Commission. During the last year in office (2018), the Government managed to secure a balanced budget with a surplus, while the sovereign debt started its downward trend and unemployment hit a record low for the first time since 2009.

To tackle the economic crisis, Cerar's government revived and strengthened national and foreign investment, including in public infrastructure with the upgrade and modernisation of rail and road connections. The Government also secured the fulfilment of key administrative and financial conditions to begin the construction of the second track of the Divača–Koper railway line. In addition, it provided incentives for start-ups and the digitalisation of public administration in cooperation with the private sector. In its efforts to overcome the crisis, the Government tried to ensure balanced regional development, including through regular government visits across the regions.

In the 2015–2016 period, the Government joined forces with the local authorities and NGOs to enable the humane and safe treatment and passage of some 500,000 migrants across the Slovenian territory. During the largest migrant wave in modern times, Cerar launched a special initiative to spur cooperation between EU Member States and the Western Balkan states, which eventually lead to the closure of the so-called Balkan migrant route.

On 14 March 2018, Cerar resigned as Prime Minister following a Supreme Court decision to overturn the results of the referendum on the second railway track which garnered 53% of support; according to him, this was "the last straw" as it provided unjustified support to all those wishing to halt the project. At the same time, his resignation averted the possible consequences of considerable financial claims by certain trade unions that would hinder the successful consolidation of public finances (due to Cerar's resignation the negotiations between the Government and public sector trade unions automatically stopped).

The resignation was announced only a few months prior to the deadline for calling and organising the regular parliamentary election. The early election was held on 3 June 2018, i.e. already within the time frame of the envisaged regular 2018 election. After his resignation, Cerar continued to serve as caretaker Prime Minister until the new government was approved on 14 September 2018.

=== 2018 parliamentary election ===
At the June 2018 early election, Cerar was re-elected deputy and his party obtained 9.7% of the vote thus losing its leading position among centrist voters. Despite considerably lower results compared to the previous election, SMC got ten deputies in a 90-seat Parliament and preserved an important role in the Slovenian political arena (sharing the third position in terms of the number of deputies). This was also one of the reasons why the party was crucial in forming the new coalition government, where it took over four ministries. In the centre-left Government, formed by Marjan Šarec in September 2018, Cerar was appointed deputy Prime Minister and Minister of Foreign Affairs; he discharged these duties until the Government resigned in March 2020.

=== Deputy prime minister and minister of foreign affairs (2018–2020) ===
Upon assuming these duties, Cerar announced and started implementing a partial change in foreign policy, which was to remain balanced in general but, in parallel, turn slightly more towards the West, favouring closer cooperation with the core countries of the European Union, with pronounced relations with Benelux, and the United States. He sped up the preparations for the Slovenian Presidency of the Council of the EU and contributed to strengthening Slovenia's credibility within the Union.

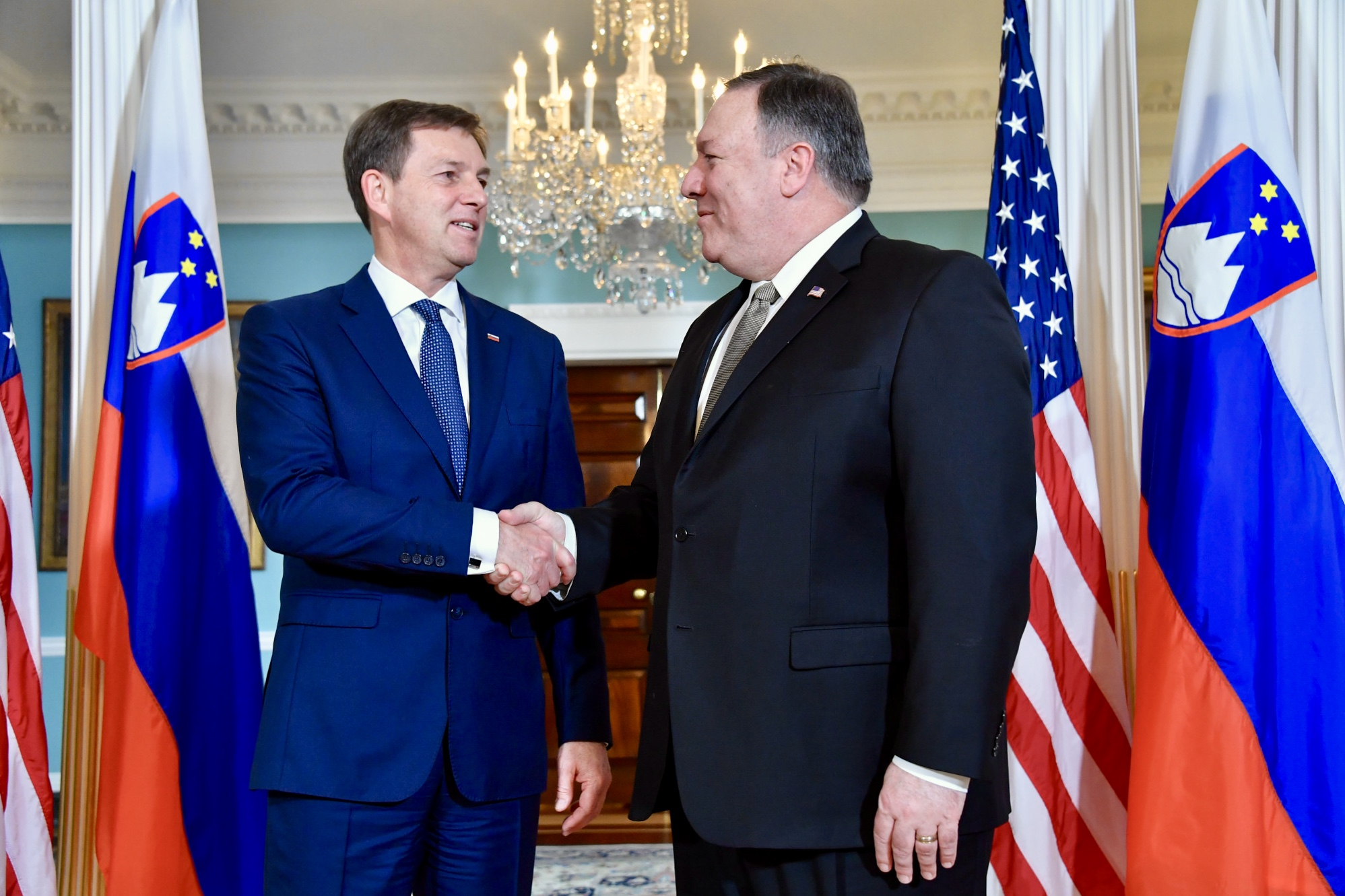
Cerar meets with U.S. Secretary of State Michael R. Pompeo at the Department of State, 14 December 2018

He strengthened the bilateral ties between Slovenia and members of the UN Security Council, as well as other countries which are particularly important to Slovenia for political, economic, and other reasons. He dedicated special attention to the strategic cooperation with Germany and France, as well as the relations with the United Kingdom in the post-Brexit period. He prioritised strengthening economic diplomacy along with efforts for sustainable development, the rule of law, human rights and non-discrimination, multilateralism and humanitarian aid. He also devoted attention to cooperation with neighbouring countries, particularly in the light of protecting the rights and interests of Slovenians living in these countries. At the European level, Cerar was among the most vocal supporters of the enlargement process to the Western Balkan countries, and closer Euro-Atlantic cooperation (accession of North Macedonia to NATO).

In the May 2019 European Parliament election, SMC only got 1.6% of the votes. Cerar did not run for MEP and soon after this weak result, he announced an electoral congress of the party to be held on 21 September 2019 where he would not run for president. At the congress, Cerar endorsed Zdravko Počivalšek as president of the party and was subsequently appointed honorary president by members of the congress

On 2 March 2020, Cerar decided to renounce his title of honorary president and leave the SMC party due to disagreements with the party's position and activities under Počivalšek.

== Honours ==
- Grand Cordon of the Order of the Rising Sun (2026)

== Publications ==
- Večrazsežnost človekovih pravic in dolžnosti (1993, updated and revised 1996),
- (I)racionalnost modernega prava (2001).
- Kako študirati pravo (2002, updated and revised 2012),
- Uvod v pravoznanstvo (2006, updated and revised 2012),
- Temelji prava in pravne ureditve (2006).
- Svet smo mi 8 (2015).
- Pravnikov mozaik (2007),
- Pamet v krizi (2010),
- Slovenci na popravnem izpitu (2013),
- Kako sem otrokom razložil demokracijo (2009) – 2010 Golden Pear Award in the category original Slovenian youth education book, awarded by Ljubljana City Library.

== See also ==
- Cabinet of Miro Cerar

Political offices
Preceded by Alenka Bratušek	Prime Minister of Slovenia; 2014–2018	Succeeded by Marjan Šarec
Preceded by Karl Erjavec	Minister of Foreign Affairs; 2018–2020	Succeeded by Anže Logar
