= Dejan Prešiček =

Slovenian saxophonist and politician (born 1970)

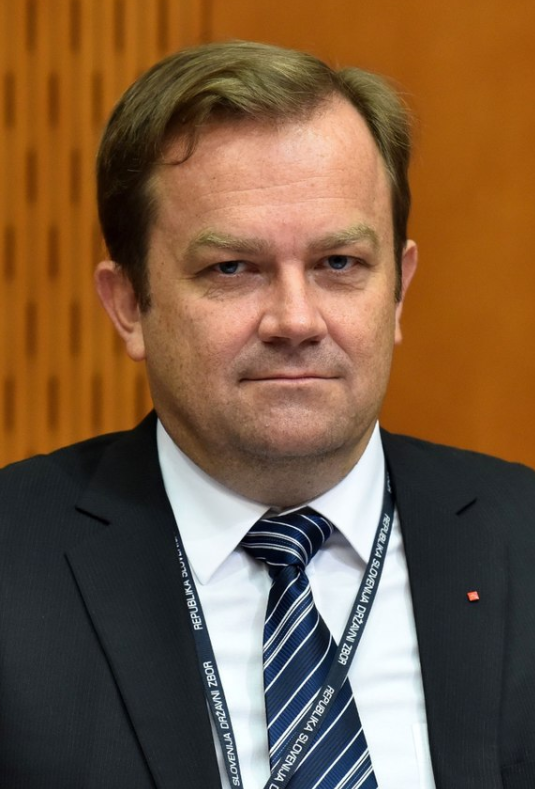
Prešiček in 2018

Dejan Prešiček (born 21 December, 1970 in Celje) is a Slovenian saxophonist and politician.

== Career ==
He graduated from the Music Academy in Frankfurt. Prešiček is also a member of the Social Democrats and served as the Minister of Culture in the 13th Government of Slovenia under the leadership of then Prime Minister Marjan Šarec.
