= Zdravko Počivalšek =

Slovenian politician (born 1957)

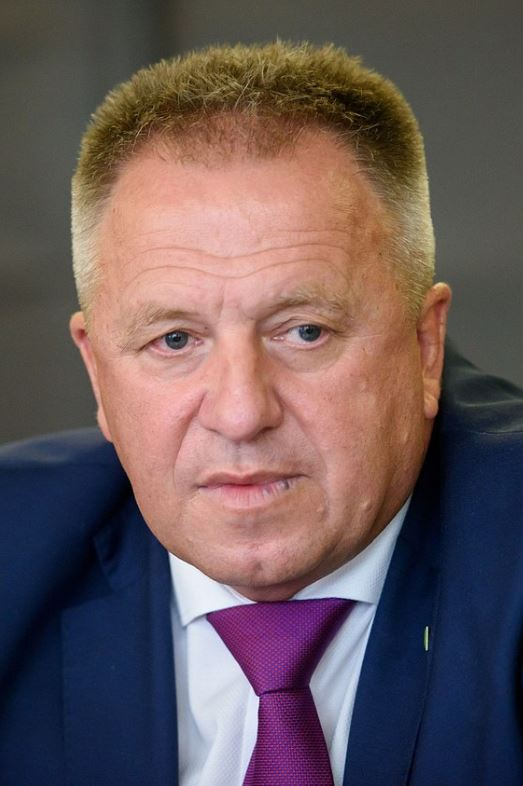
- Zdravko Počivalšek in 2018

Minister of Economic Development and Technology
- In office 4 December 2014 – 1 June 2022
- Prime Minister: Miro Cerar; Marjan Šarec; Janez Janša
- Preceded by: Jožef Petrovič
- Succeeded by: Matjaž Han

Personal details
- Born: 25 November 1957 (age 68)
- Party: Concretely (2021–present); Modern Centre Party (before 2021)

Zdravko Počivalšek (born 25 November 1957) is a Slovenian politician. He served as the Minister of Economic Development and Technology in the 12th, 13th and 14th Government of Slovenia. He was also the president of Modern Centre Party from 2019 to 2021 and is the current president of liberal Concretely party. He led the party until June 2023. During the November of 2023, Počivalšek joined the expert council of the Slovenian Democratic Party, but did not become a member of the party.
