= Andrej Šircelj =

Slovenian politician (born 1959)

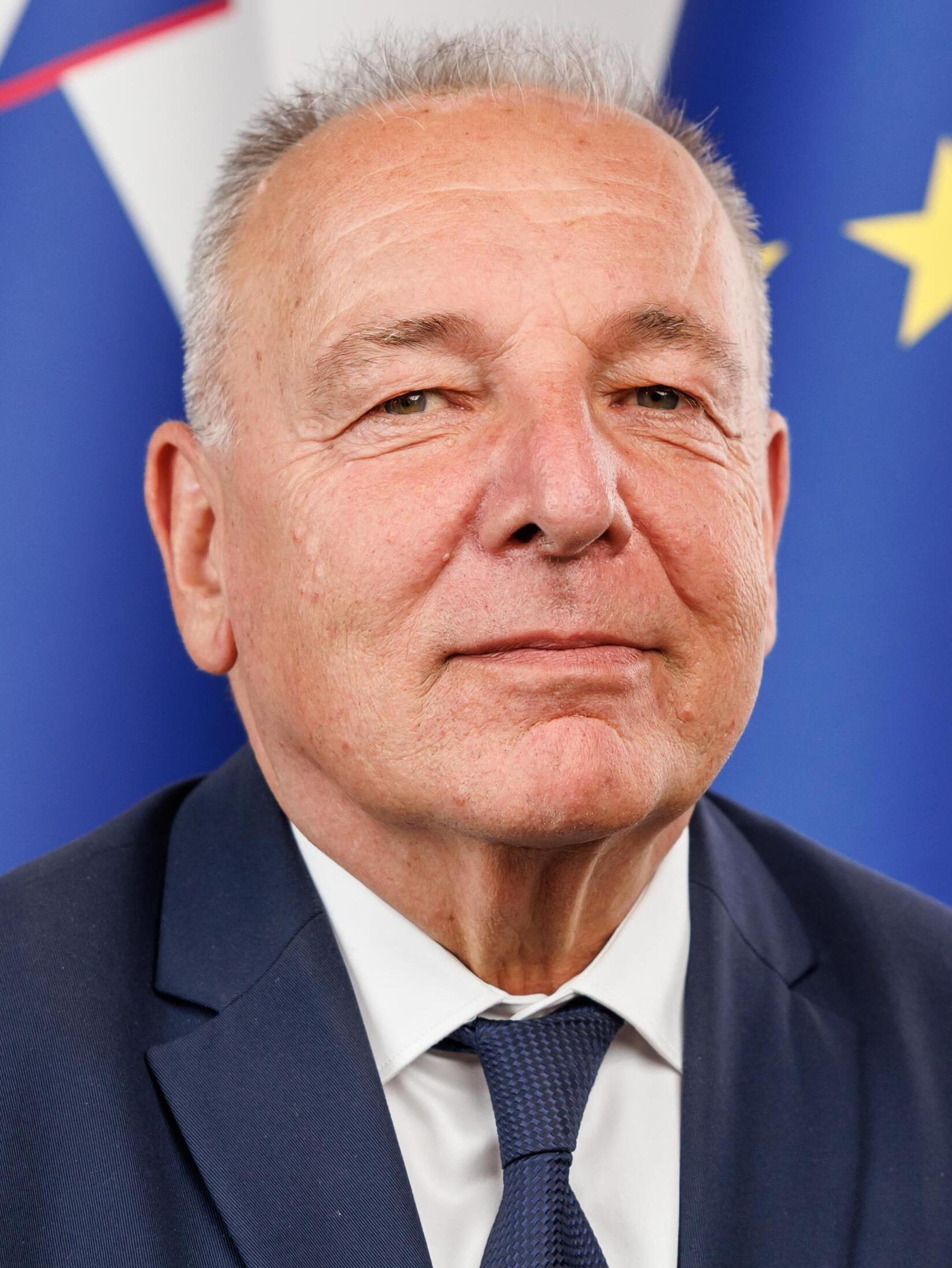
- Official portrait, 2026

Minister of Finance
- Incumbent
- Assumed office 4 June 2026
- Prime Minister: Janez Janša
- Preceded by: Klemen Boštjančič
- In office 13 March 2020 – 1 June 2022
- Prime Minister: Janez Janša
- Preceded by: Andrej Bertoncelj
- Succeeded by: Klemen Boštjančič

Personal details
- Born: 28 February 1959 (age 67)

Andrej Šircelj (born 28 February 1959) is a Slovenian politician serving as Minister of Finance since 2026, having previously served from 2020 to 2022.

== Early life and education ==
Šircelj graduated from the Faculty of Economics in Ljubljana and completed his master’s degree at the Faculty of Law at the University of Maribor.

== Political career ==
In the 2011 elections Šircelj became a member of the National Assembly, where he chaired the Committee on Finance and Monetary Policy. He was re-elected as deputy to the National Assembly in the early 2014 elections. During his two terms of office as deputy, he worked in the fields of finance and taxes, chaired the Commission for Public Finance Control and was a member of the Constitutional Commission and the Committee on Foreign Policy.

In addition to his committee assignments, Šircelj was a member of the Slovenian delegation to the Parliamentary Assembly of the Council of Europe. In this capacity, he served – alongside Yuliya Lovochkina – as co-rapporteur for the monitoring of Armenia.

Also during his time in parliament, Šircelj served as president of the board of Slovenia’s Bank Asset Management Company (BAMC), a bad bank which bought up non-performing loans from the country’s largely state-owned banks in 2013 and 2014 to get them off their books.

When Slovenia held the rotating presidency of the Council of the European Union in 2021, Šircelj chaired the meetings of the Economic and Financial Affairs Council.

== Other activities ==
- European Bank for Reconstruction and Development (EBRD), Ex-Officio Member of the Board of Governors (since 2020)
- European Investment Bank (EIB), Ex-Officio Member of the Board of Governors (since 2020)
- European Stability Mechanism (ESM), Ex-Officio Member of the Board of Governors (since 2020)
- Inter-American Development Bank (IDB), Ex-Officio Member of the Board of Governors (since 2020)

Government offices
| Preceded by Andrej Bertoncelj | Minister of Finance; 2020–2022 | Succeeded by Klemen Boštjančič |
