= Ksenija Klampfer =

Slovenian politician (born 1976)

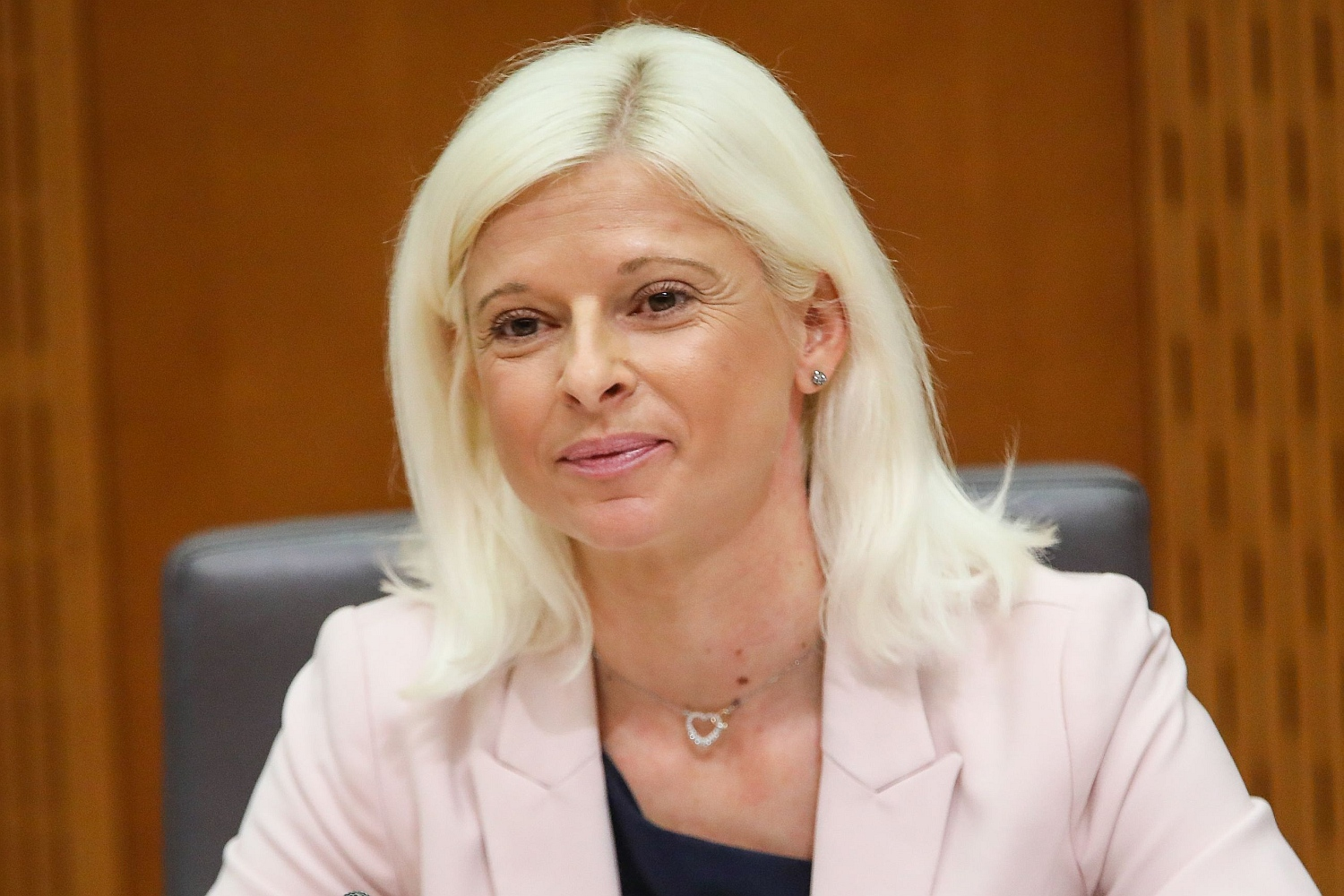
- Klampfer in 2018

Minister of Digital Transformation
- In office 17 December 2024 – 4 June 2026
- Prime Minister: Robert Golob
- Preceded by: Emilija Stojmenova Duh

Minister of Labour, Family, Social Affairs and Equal Opportunities
- In office 13 September 2018 – 13 March 2020
- Prime Minister: Marjan Šarec
- Preceded by: Anja Kopač
- Succeeded by: Janez Cigler Kralj

Personal details
- Born: 27 July 1976 (age 49)
- Party: Freedom Movement (since 2022)
- Other political affiliations: LMŠ (until 2020)

Ksenija Klampfer (born 27 July 1976) is a Slovenian politician serving as minister of digital transformation since 2024. From 2018 to 2020, she served as minister of labour, family, social affairs and equal opportunities.
