= Roman Kirn =

Slovenian diplomat

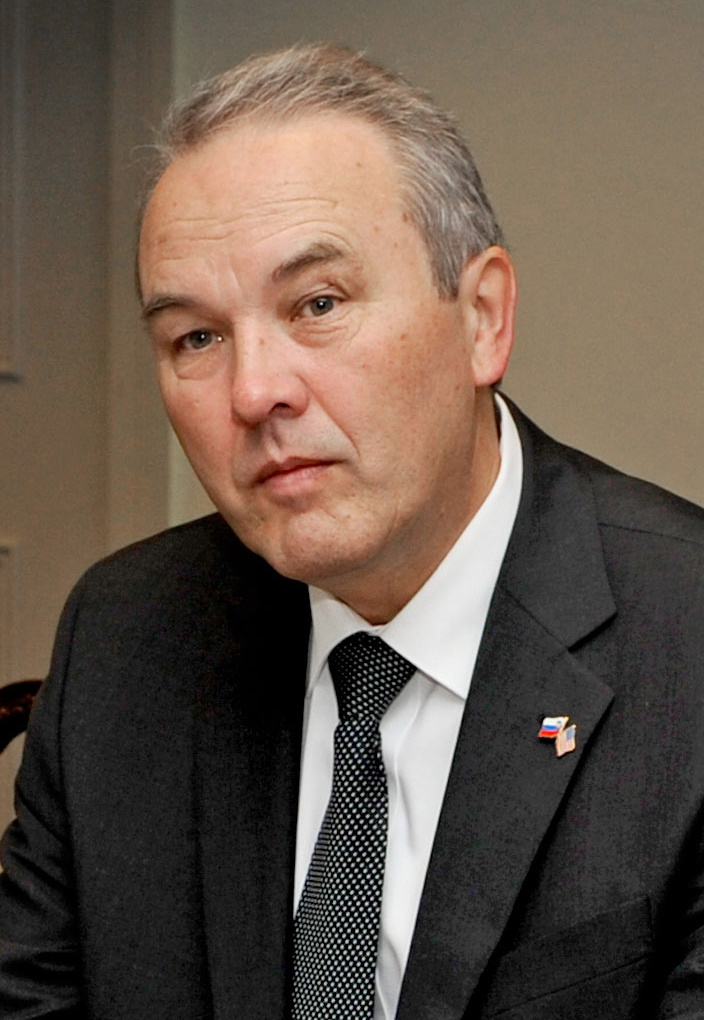
Roman Kirn in 2010

Roman Kirn (born 1952) was the ambassador of the Republic of Slovenia to the United States, Mexico and The Netherlands. He was appointed Ambassador of Slovenia to the United States of America on 26 May 2009 and to the United Mexican States on 20 January 2011. From 22 July 2002 until December 2006, he was permanent Representative (or ambassador) of Slovenia to the United Nations. Prior to that appointment, at Slovenia's Ministry of Foreign Affairs, he served as State Undersecretary and Head of the Multilateral Relations Department. He was Ambassador of Slovenia to the Kingdom of The Netherlands from 16 October 2013 until June 2017.
