= Ministry of Infrastructure (Slovenia) =

Government ministry of Slovenia

Ministry of Infrastructure (Slovene: Ministrstvo za infrastrukturo) is a government ministry of Slovenia. Its head office is in Ljubljana.
