= Andrej Bertoncelj =

Slovenian economist and politician

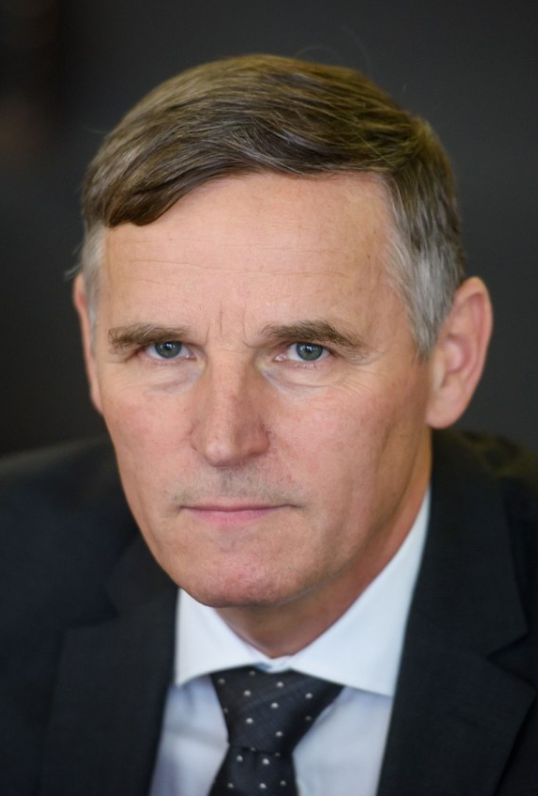
- Andrej Bertoncelj in 2018

Minister of Finance
- In office September 13, 2018 – January 27, 2020
- Preceded by: Mateja Vraničar Erman
- Succeeded by: Andrej Šircelj

Personal details
- Party: Prerod (since 2025)
- Other political affiliations: Independent (2022–2025); LMŠ (until 2022)

Andrej Bertoncelj is a Slovenian economist and politician. From September 2018, he served as Minister of Finance in the 13th Government of Slovenia. He resigned in January 2020.

== Biography ==
Bertoncelj holds a Ph.D. in economics with a focus on finance. He has primarily worked in the pharmaceutical sector, serving as the president of Lek USA, assistant to the general director for finance at Lek, and director of SPE. Since 2009, he has been a full professor at the Faculty of Management, University of Primorska.

=== Minister of Finance ===
Bertoncelj was appointed as the Minister of Finance of Slovenia on 13 September 2018, in the 13th Government of Slovenia led by Prime Minister Marjan Šarec. However, he resigned from his position on January 27, 2020, due to disagreements over a proposed law to abolish supplementary health insurance, which would have been compensated for by the state budget. A few hours later, Prime Minister Marjan Šarec also resigned.

== Publications ==
- 2015. Trajnostni razvoj: ekonomski, družbeni in okoljski vidiki. Ljubljana: IUS Software, GV založba. ISBN 978-961-247-300-6.

Preceded by Mateja Vraničar Erman	Minister of Finance; 2018–2020	Succeeded by Andrej Šircelj
