= Marjan Šarec =

Prime Minister of Slovenia in 2018 to 2020

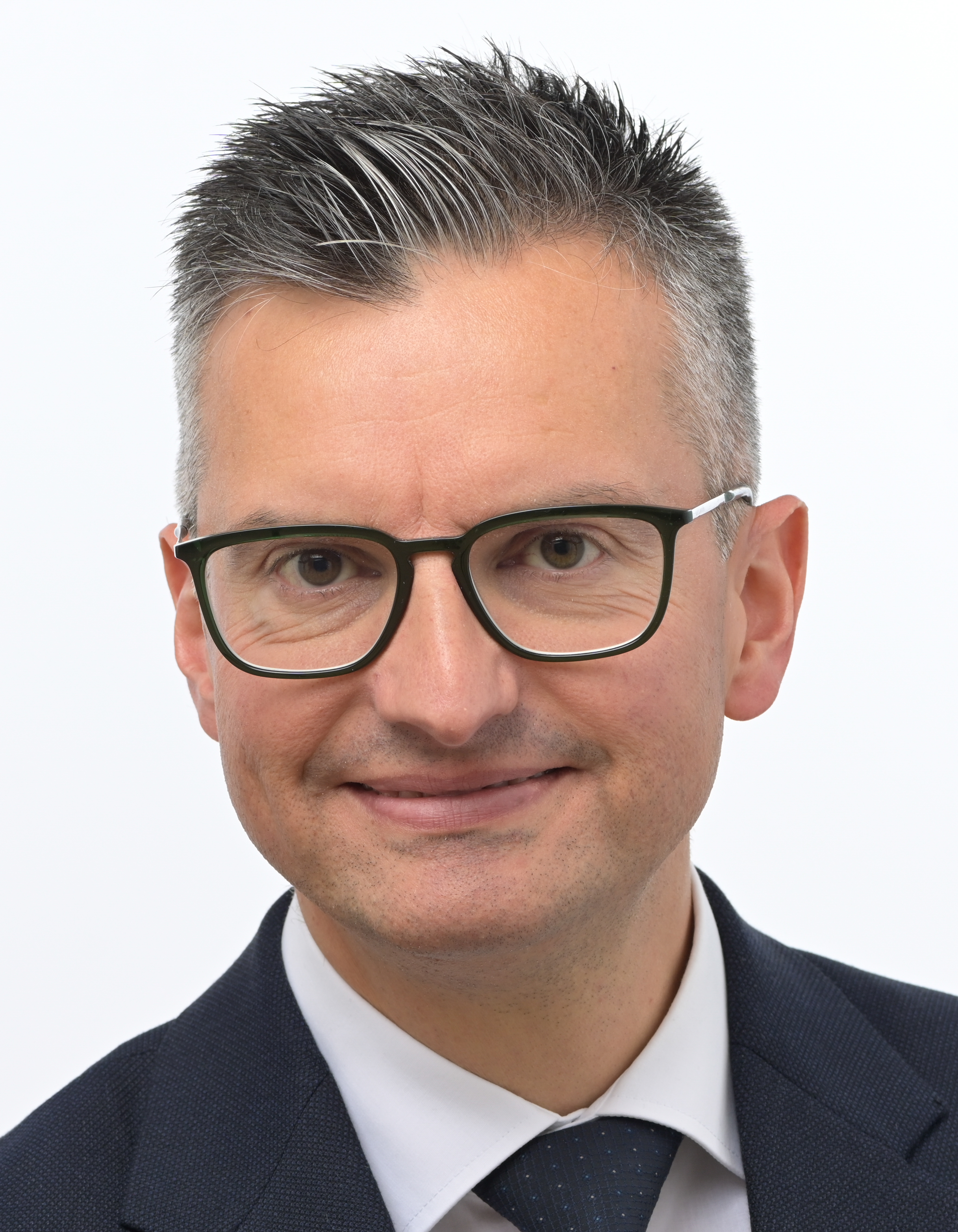
- Official portrait, 2024

Member of the European Parliament for Slovenia
- Incumbent
- Assumed office 16 July 2024

Prime Minister of Slovenia
- In office 13 September 2018 – 13 March 2020
- President: Borut Pahor
- Deputy: Miro Cerar; Alenka Bratušek; Karl Erjavec; Jernej Pikalo; Andrej Bertoncelj
- Preceded by: Miro Cerar
- Succeeded by: Janez Janša

Minister of Defence
- In office 1 June 2022 – 16 July 2024
- Prime Minister: Robert Golob
- Preceded by: Matej Tonin
- Succeeded by: Robert Golob (acting); Borut Sajovic

President of the List of Marjan Šarec
- In office 31 May 2014 – 27 June 2022
- Preceded by: Position established
- Succeeded by: Position abolished

Personal details
- Born: 2 December 1977 (age 48) Ljubljana, SR Slovenia, SFR Yugoslavia (now Slovenia)
- Party: List of Marjan Šarec (2014–2022); Freedom Movement (2022–present)
- Education: Academy of theatre, radio, film and television Ljubljana
- Website: Official website

Marjan Šarec (born 2 December 1977) is a Slovenian politician, actor and comedian who served as Prime Minister of Slovenia from 2018 to 2020. He also served as the Minister of Defence in the government of Prime Minister Robert Golob from June 2022 to July 2024 when he was elected to the European Parliament.

He started his career as a comedian and satirist before entering politics. Elected twice as Mayor of Kamnik (2010–2018), Šarec ran in the 2017 presidential election, narrowly losing to the incumbent Borut Pahor in the run-off. He entered the National Assembly in the parliamentary election of 2018 with his party, the List of Marjan Šarec. On 17 August 2018, he became Prime Minister of Slovenia. On 27 January 2020 he announced his resignation as Prime Minister.

== Education and early career in comedy ==
Marjan Šarec commenced his education by joining Marija Vera primary school in Duplica neighbourhood of Kamnik. Subsequently, he enrolled in a vocational course at the High School for Woodcraft in Ljubljana. After graduating from high school in 1996 and following the advice of director Marjan Bevk, Šarec graduated as an actor from the Academy of Theatre, Radio, Film and Television (part of the University of Ljubljana) in 2001. In the following years, he was actively involved with the Slovenian National television, appearing in Sašo Hribar's radio show Radio Ga-Ga and TV show Hri-bar. Šarec was mostly working as a comedian and political satirist. During this time, his famous stage persona was Ivan Serpentinšek, a grouchy rural character from Upper Carniola. He also imitated several famous people, including former President of Slovenia Janez Drnovšek, Karel Erjavec, Osama bin Laden, Fidel Castro, Anton Rop, Jelko Kacin, Janez Janša, Andrej Bajuk, and others. He was also working as a journalist and editor.

== Political career ==
=== Local politics ===
In the 2010 election, Šarec ran for office of mayor of Kamnik, a town in north-central Slovenia. In a rare case among Slovenian media personalities who attempted to enter national or local politics, Šarec was successful. After finishing second in the first round, he narrowly won the runoff. After being a member of Zoran Janković's Positive Slovenia party, Šarec entered the 2014 local election with his own political list and was reelected in the first round with almost two thirds of the vote. After becoming an elected official, Šarec retired his stage personas and became fully committed to the work of the mayor.

=== Presidential campaign ===
In May 2017, Šarec announced he would run in the upcoming presidential election, to take place on October 22. Despite the media reminding him of his acting career, Šarec stated he was completely serious about the candidacy, as "the function of the president should be treated as a serious one". Criticizing the incumbent president Borut Pahor for treating the presidential function as a celebrity, Šarec was viewed as a potentially strong candidate, one who could attract the younger generation of voters and voters leaning towards the left side of political spectrum. In the first round of the election, Šarec won 25% of the vote, resulting in a run-off against Pahor on 12 November, in which he narrowly lost.

=== Prime Minister of Slovenia ===
In June 2018, Šarec participated in the parliamentary election with the List of Marjan Šarec. The party won 12.6% of the vote, resulting in 13 MPs. LMŠ became the second-biggest party in the National Assembly. On 17 August 2018, he was elected as the new head of government, leading the 13th Government of Slovenia.

On 27 January 2020, Šarec resigned from the post, following the resignation of the Minister of Finance, who resigned because of the proposed changes to the health-related legislation.

Political offices
Preceded by Miro Cerar	Prime Minister of Slovenia; 2018–2020	Succeeded by Janez Janša
Preceded by Matej Tonin	Minister of Defence; 2022–2024	Succeeded by Robert Golob; Acting
