= Government of Slovenia =

Executive authority in Slovenia

The Government of the Republic of Slovenia (Slovene: Vlada Republike Slovenije) is the cabinet of Slovenia. It exercises executive authority pursuant to the Constitution and the laws of Slovenia. It is also the highest administrative authority in Slovenia.

The government carries out the country's domestic and foreign policy, shaped by the National Assembly; it directs and coordinates the work of government institutions and bears full responsibility for everything occurring within the authority of executive power. The government, headed by the prime minister, thus represents the country's political leadership and makes decisions in the name of the whole executive power.

The Government's role is greatly enhanced compared to cabinets in other parliamentary democracies since it is both the de jure and de facto executive authority. The Constitution explicitly vests executive power in the Government, not the president. In many other parliamentary democracies, the head of state is at least nominal chief executive.

The following duties are attributed to the government:

1. executes the domestic and foreign policies of the state;
2. directs and co-ordinates the activities of government agencies;
3. administers the implementation of laws, resolutions of the National Assembly, and legislation of the president of the Republic of Slovenia;
4. introduces bills and submits international treaties to the National Assembly for ratification and denunciation;
5. prepares the draft of the state budget and submits it to the National Assembly, administers the implementation of the state budget and presents a report on the performance of the state budget to the National Assembly;
6. issues regulations and orders based on and for the implementation of the law;
7. manages relations with other states;
8. performs other duties which the Constitution and the laws vest in the Government of the Republic.

== Statistics ==
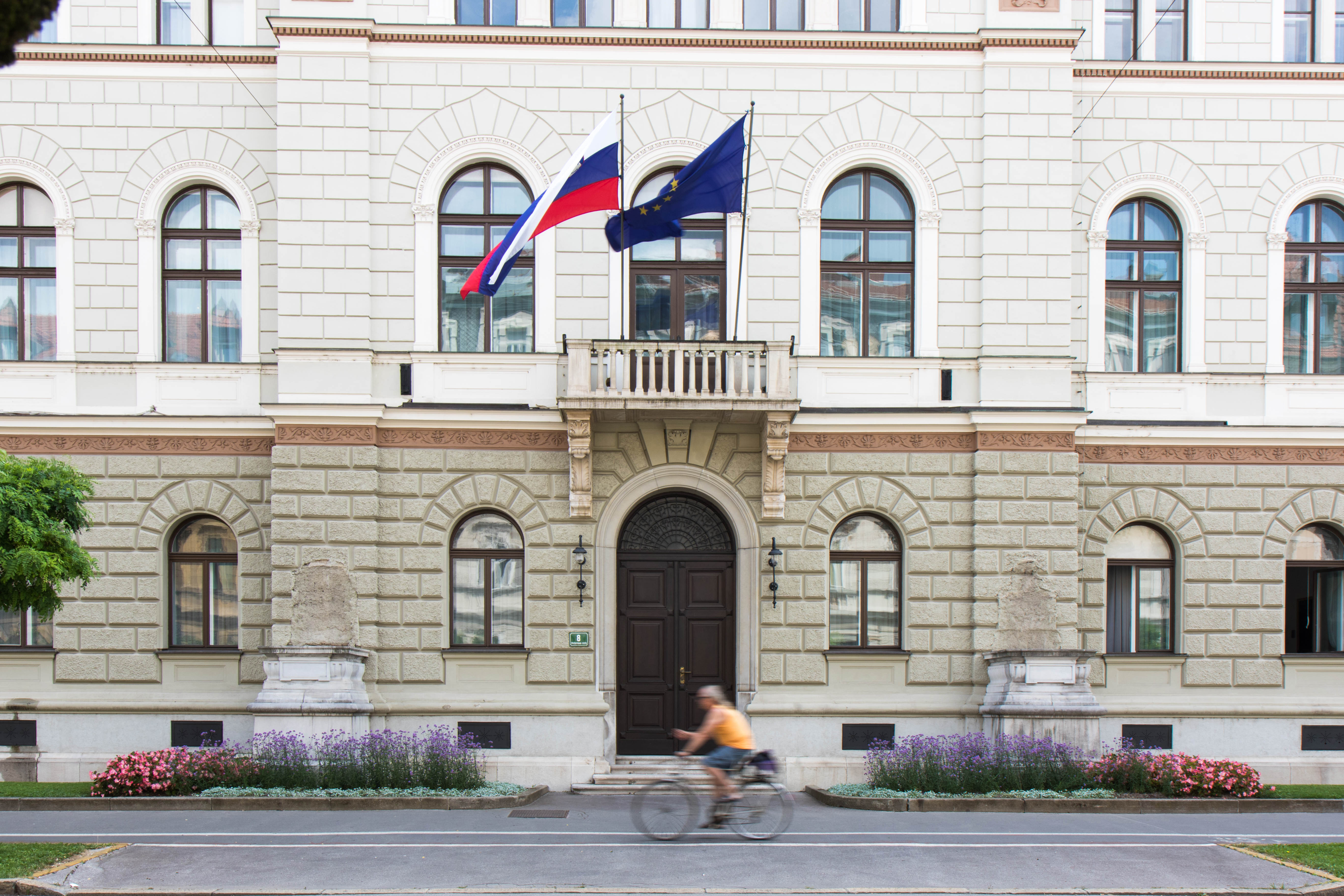
Government Building and President's Office of Slovenia

The longest-serving prime minister to date was Janez Drnovšek who held the post for ten years and 45 days (3,695 days) between the years 1992 and 2002, followed by Janez Janša who ruled for over seven years (2,663 days). He also holds the longest uninterrupted mandate of 2,180 days between the years 2004 and 2008. The shortest term is held by Andrej Bajuk, who was in the position for 176 days. Alenka Bratušek is the first woman to take the position of the Prime Minister of Slovenia and, until now, the only one to do so. The first minority cabinet was led by Borut Pahor in 2012 as two coalition parties, Zares and DeSUS, left the coalition. The first preliminary elections followed just a few months after the coalition's break up. Since then, Slovenia witnessed its second preliminary election in 2014, when Janša's second cabinet broke up after DeSUS and DL left the coalition and the cabinet found itself in the minority. Another snap election was called in 2018, before in 2022, the first regularly scheduled parliamentary election since 2008 was held.

== Current government ==
The composition of the current Slovenian government (as of August 2022) is the following:

=== Cabinet ===
Portfolio	Minister	Party	Took office	Left office
Prime Minister	Janez Janša	SDS	June 4, 2026	Incumbent
Deputy Prime Ministers
Minister of Economy, Labour, and Sport	Anže Logar	Demokrati.	June 4, 2026	Incumbent
Minister of Infrastructure and Energy	Jernej Vrtovec	NSi	June 4, 2026	Incumbent
Ministers
Minister of Finance	Andrej Šircelj	SDS	June 4, 2026	Incumbent
Minister of the Interior and Public Administration	Franci Matoz	SDS	June 4, 2026	Incumbent
Minister of Education, Science, and Youth	Borut Rončević	SDS	June 4, 2026	Incumbent
Minister of Health	Tadej Ostrc	Demokrati.	June 4, 2026	Incumbent
Minister of the Environment and Spatial Planning	Polona Rifelj	SDS	June 4, 2026	Incumbent
Minister of Demography, Family, and Social Affairs	Mateja Ribič	NSi	June 4, 2026	Incumbent
Minister of Justice	Mihael Zupančič	Demokrati.	June 4, 2026	Incumbent
Minister of Agriculture	Janez Cigler Kralj	NSi	June 4, 2026	Incumbent
Minister of Culture	Ignacija Fridl Jarc	SDS	June 4, 2026	Incumbent
Minister of Local Self-Government, Cohesion, and Regional Development	Monika Kirbiš Rojs	FOKUS	June 4, 2026	Incumbent
Minister of Defence	Valentin Hajdinjak	NSi	June 4, 2026	Incumbent
Minister of Foreign and European Affairs	Tone Kajzer	SDS	June 4, 2026	Incumbent
Minister without portfolio for Relations between the Republic of Slovenia and the Autochthonous Slovenian National Community in Neighbouring Countries, and between the Republic of Slovenia and Slovenians Abroad	Suzana Lep Šimenko	SDS	June 4, 2026	Incumbent

== Government history ==
=== First Slovenian Government in the State of Slovenes, Croats and Serbs ===
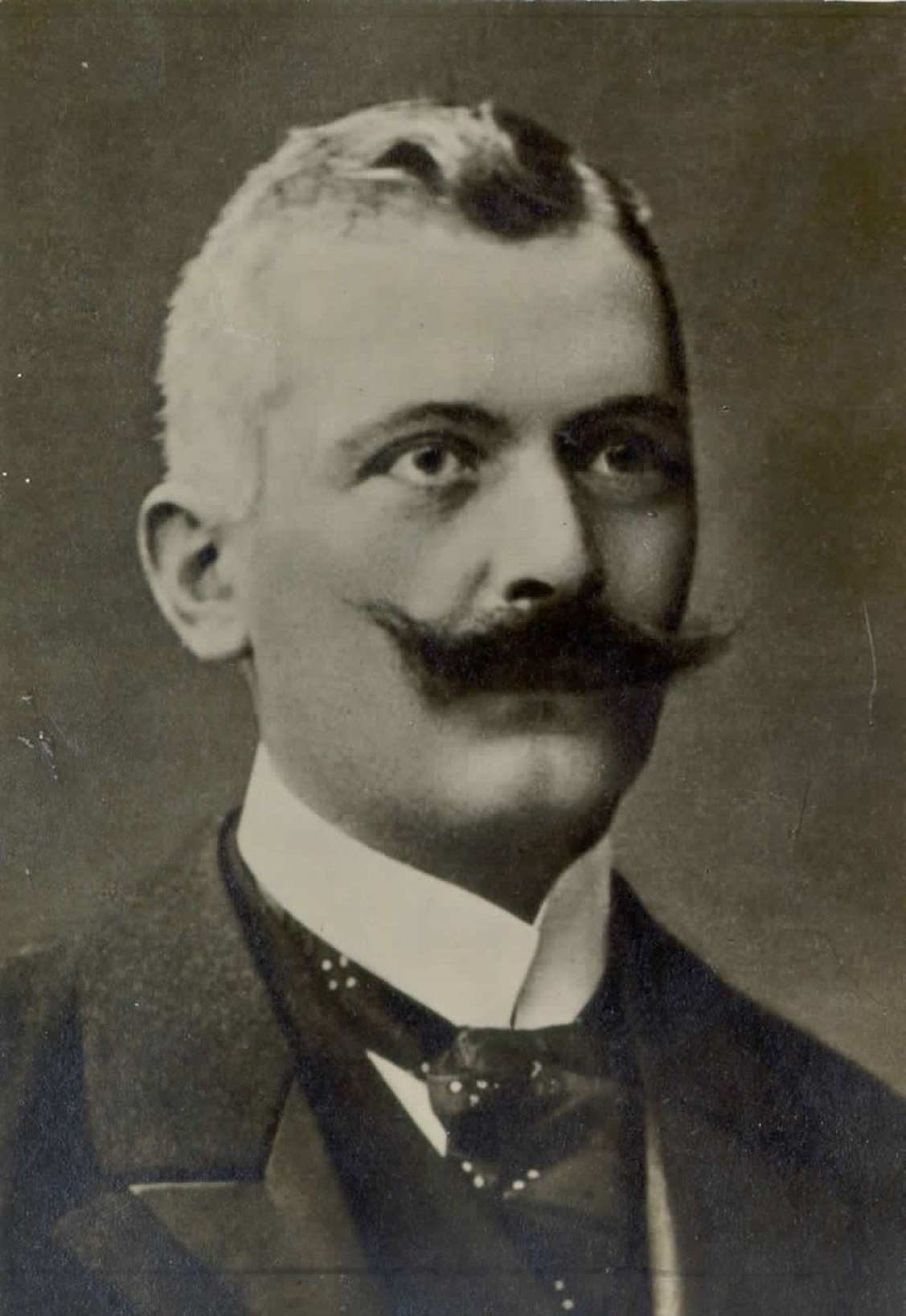
Knight Josip Pogačnik, first slovene prime minister in State SHS

Slovenian National Council (Slovene: :Slovenski narodni svet) was the first executive council established in Slovenia, though it never became Slovenian parliament. The Council named on the 31. of October 1918 the first Slovene National government (Slovene: :Narodna vlada). Knight Josip Pogačnik was named as the first Slovene prime minister in the State of Slovenes, Croats and Serbs (SHS). The government, which had full organisational capabilities, took care of peace and order, economy, transport, education, food, science, culture and other public affairs. The Cabinet consisted of 12 departments called poverjeništva, that were led by representatives of all major Slovenian parties at the time. The government was active until 20. January 1919, when it was relieved by the new government of Kingdom of Serbs, Croats and Slovenes in Belgrade.

=== List of governments of the Republic of Slovenia ===
Assembly of Socialist Republic of Slovenia in 1990 accepted two new acts that allowed the unification of political parties in the Republic and elections to new assemblies. The president of the Assembly Miran Potrč determined the date of the first democratic elections in Socialist Republic of Slovenia to be on the 8 of April 1990. Since 16 May 1990 (the first multi-party parliamentary election held following the 45-year Communist rule), the Republic of Slovenia has had a total of twelve governments headed by eight different prime ministers. The prime minister in the first government of the Republic of Slovenia was Lojze Peterle. That government was formed by the coalition Democratic Opposition of Slovenia (Demos), which composed of five parties: Slovene Christian Democrats (SKD), (Slovenian Social Democratic Union (SDZS), Slovenian Democratic Union (SDZ), Farmers' Alliance (SLS) and Greens of Slovenia (ZS). Since the first government eight governments have been formed by the left parties and four by the right political parties.

=== Golob Government (2022–2026) ===
The cabinet was sworn on 1 June 2022.

=== Janša III Government (2020–2022) ===
The cabinet was sworn on 13 March 2020.

Name	Position	Party	Took office
Janez Janša (born 1958)	Prime Minister	SDS	13 March 2020
Zdravko Počivalšek (born 1957)	Deputy Prime Minister; Minister of Economic Development and Technology	SMC/Concretly	13 March 2020
Matej Tonin (born 1983)	Deputy Prime Minister; Minister of Defence	NSi	13 March 2020
Jože Podgoršek (born 1974)	Minister of Agriculture, Forestry and Food	DeSUS	15 October 2020
Simona Kustec (born 1976)	Minister of Education, Science and Sport	SMC/Concretly	13 March 2020
Janez Cigler Kralj (born 1978)	Minister of Labour, Family, Social Affairs and Equal Opportunity	NSi	13 March 2020
Jernej Vrtovec (born 1985)	Minister of Infrastructure	NSi	13 March 2020
Aleš Hojs (born 1961)	Minister of the Interior	SDS	13 March 2020
Andrej Vizjak (born 1964)	Minister of Environment and Spatial Planning	SDS	13 March 2020
Andrej Šircelj (born 1959)	Minister of Finance	SDS	13 March 2020
Vasko Simoniti (born 1951)	Minister of Culture	SDS	13 March 2020
Janez Poklukar (born 1978)	Minister of Health	Ind.	23 February 2021
Boštjan Koritnik (born 1979)	Minister of Public Administration	SMC/Concretly	13 March 2020
Anže Logar (born 1976)	Minister of Foreign Affairs	SDS	13 March 2020
Marjan Dikaučič (born 1981)	Minister of Justice	SMC/Concretly	15 June 2021
Zvone Černač (born 1962)	Minister without portfolio for Development and European Cohesion Policy	SDS	13 March 2020
Helena Jaklitsch (born 1976)	Minister without portfolio for Slovenian Diaspora	SDS	13 March 2020

=== Šarec Government (2018–2020) ===
The cabinet was sworn on 13 September 2018.

=== Cerar Government (2014–2018) ===
The cabinet was sworn on 18 September 2014.

=== Bratušek Government (2013–2014) ===
The cabinet was sworn on 20 March 2013.

Name	Position	Portfolio	Party	Period
Alenka Bratušek	Prime Minister	Prime Minister	PS	2013-2014
Alenka Bratušek	Prime Minister	Prime Minister	ZaAB	2013-2014
Dejan Židan	Vice president	Minister of Agriculture, Forestry and Food	SD	2013–2014
Karl Erjavec	Vice president	Minister of Foreign Affairs	DeSUS	2013–2014
Gregor Virant	Vice president	Minister of Interior and Public Administration	DL	2013–2014
Uroš Čufer	Minister	Minister of Finance	PS	2013–2014
Roman Jakič	Minister	Minister of Defence	PS	2013-2014
Roman Jakič	Minister	Minister of Defence	ZaAB	2013-2014
Stanko Stepišnik	Minister	Minister of Economic Development and Technology	PS	2013–2014
Metod Dragonja	Minister	Minister of Economic Development and Technology	PS/ZaAB	2014
Senko Pličanič	Minister	Minister of Justice	DL	2013–2014
Jernej Pikalo	Minister	Minister of Education, Science and Sport	SD	2013–2014
Uroš Grilc	Minister	Minister of Culture	PS	2013-2014
Uroš Grilc	Minister	Minister of Culture	ZaAB	2013-2014
Tomaž Gantar	Minister	Minister of Health	DeSUS	2013–2014
Alenka Trop Skaza	Minister	Minister of Health	Independent	2014
Alenka Bratušek	Prime Minister/Minister (acting)	Minister of Health	ZaAB	2014
Igor Maher	Minister	Minister of Infrastructure and Urban Planning	DL	2013
Samo Omerzel	Minister	Minister of Infrastructure and Urban Planning	DL	2013–2014
Anja Kopač Mrak	Minister	Minister of Labour, Family, Social Affairs and Equal Opportunities	SD	2013–2014
Tina Komel	Minister	Minister without portfolio for Slovenian diaspora	PS	2013–2014
Gorazd Žmavc	Minister	Minister without portfolio for Slovenian diaspora	DeSUS	2014

=== Janša II Government (2012–2013) ===
The cabinet was sworn in on 10 February 2012.

Prime Minister	Janez Janša (Slovenian Democratic Party)
Minister of Foreign Affairs	(2012–2013): Karl Erjavec (DeSUS)
Minister of Justice and Public Administration	(2012–2013): Senko Pličanič (Gregor Virant's Civic List); (2013): Zvonko Černač (Slovenian Democratic Party)
Minister of Defence	(2012–2013): Aleš Hojs (New Slovenia)
Minister of Finance	(2012–2013): Janez Šušteršič (Gregor Virant's Civic List); (2013–2013): Janez Janša (Slovenian Democratic Party)
Minister of Interior	(2012–2013): Vinko Gorenak (Slovenian Democratic Party)
Minister of Education, Science, Culture and Sport	(2012–2013): Žiga Turk (Slovenian Democratic Party)
Minister of Social Affairs	(2012–2013): Andrej Vizjak (Slovenian Democratic Party)
Minister of Health	(2012–2013): Tomaž Gantar (DeSUS)
Minister of Economy and Technology	(2012–2013): Radovan Žerjav (Slovenian People's Party)
Minister of Agriculture and Environment	(2012–2013): Franc Bogovič (Slovenian People's Party)
Minister of Infrastructure and Urban Planning	(2012–2013): Zvonko Černač (Slovenian Democratic Party)
Minister without portfolio for Slovenian diaspora	(2012–2013): Ljudmila Novak (New Slovenia)

=== Pahor Government (2008–2012) ===
Prime Minister	Borut Pahor (Social Democrats)
Minister of Foreign Affairs	(2008–2012): Samuel Žbogar (Social Democrats)
Minister of Justice	(2008–2012): Aleš Zalar (Liberal Democracy of Slovenia)
Minister of Defence	(2008–2012): Ljubica Jelušič (Social Democrats)
Minister of Finance	(2008–2012): Franci Križanič (Social Democrats)
Minister of Interior	(2008–2011): Katarina Kresal (Liberal Democracy of Slovenia); (2011–2012): Aleš Zalar (Liberal Democracy of Slovenia)
Minister of Education	(2008–2012): Igor Lukšič (Social Democrats)
Minister of Higher Education	(2008–2011): Gregor Golobič (Zares); (2011–2012): Igor Lukšič (acting) (Social Democrats)
Minister of Culture	(2008–2011): Majda Širca Ravnikar (Zares); (2011–2012): Boštjan Žekš (acting) (Social Democrats)
Minister of Social Affairs	(2008–2012): Ivan Svetlik (Democratic Party of Pensioners of Slovenia)
Minister of Health	(2008–2010): Borut Miklavčič (Social Democrats); (2010–2012): Dorijan Marušič (Social Democrats)
Minister of Economy	(2008–2010): Matej Lahovnik (Zares); (2010–2011): Darja Radič (Zares); (2011–2012): Mitja Gaspari (acting) (Social Democrats)
Minister of Agriculture	(2008–2010): Milan Pogačnik (Social Democrats); (2010): Henrik Gjerkeš (Democratic Party of Pensioners of Slovenia); (2010–2012): Dejan Židan (Social Democrats)
Minister of Environment	(2008–2010): Karl Erjavec (Democratic Party of Pensioners of Slovenia); (2008–2010): Roko Žarnič (Democratic Party of Pensioners of Slovenia)
Minister of Transport	(2008–2012): Patrik Vlačič (Social Democrats)
Minister of Public Administration	(2008–2011): Irma Pavlinič Krebs (Zares); (2011–2012): Borut Pahor (acting) (Social Democrats)
Minister without portfolio for Local Autonomies and Regional Development	(2008–2009): Zlata Ploštajner (Democratic Party of Pensioners of Slovenia); (2009–2010): Henrik Gjerkeš (Democratic Party of Pensioners of Slovenia); (2011): Dušan Trobec Bučan(Democratic Party of Pensioners of Slovenia); (2011): Boštjan Žekš (acting) (Social Democrats)
Minister without portfolio for Economic Development and European Affairs	(2008–2012): Mitja Gaspari (Social Democrats)
Minister without portfolio for Slovenian diaspora	(2008–2012): Boštjan Žekš (Social Democrats)

=== Janša I Government (2004–2008) ===
Prime Minister	Janez Janša (Slovenian Democratic Party)
Minister of Foreign Affairs	(2004–2008): Dimitrij Rupel (Independent)
Minister of Justice	(2004–2008): Lovro Šturm (New Slovenia)
Minister of Defence	(2004–2008): Karl Erjavec (DeSUS)
Minister of Finance	(2004–2008): Andrej Bajuk (New Slovenia)
Minister of Interior	(2004–2008): Dragutin Mate (Slovenian Democratic Party)
Minister of Education	(2004–2008): Milan Zver (Slovenian Democratic Party)
Minister of Higher Education	(2004–2007): Jure Zupan (New Slovenia); (2007–2008): Mojca Kucler Dolinar (New Slovenia)
Minister of Culture	(2004–2008): Vasko Simoniti (Slovenian Democratic Party)
Minister of Social Affairs	(2004–2006): Janez Drobnič (New Slovenia); (2006–2008): Marjeta Cotman (New Slovenia)
Minister of Health	(2004–2007): Andrej Bručan (Slovenian Democratic Party); (2007–2008): Zofija Mazej Kukovič (Slovenian Democratic Party)
Minister of Economy	(2004–2008): Andrej Vizjak (Slovenian Democratic Party)
Minister of Agriculture	(2004–2007): Marija Lukačič (Slovenian Democratic Party); (2007–2008): Iztok Jarc (Slovenian Democratic Party)
Minister of Environment	(2004–2008): Janez Podobnik (Slovenian People's Party)
Minister of Transport	(2004–2007): Janez Božič (Slovenian People's Party); (2007–2008): Radovan Žerjav (Slovenian People's Party)
Minister of Public Administration	(2004–2008): Gregor Virant (Independent)
Minister without portfolio for Local Autonomies and Regional Development	(2004–2008): Ivan Žagar (Slovenian People's Party)
Minister without portfolio for Economic Development	(2005–2006): Jože Damjan (Independent); (2006–2007): Andrej Horvat (Independent – Social Democrats); (2007–2008): Žiga Turk (Independent – Slovenian Democratic Party)

=== Rop Government (2002–2004) ===
Prime Minister	Anton Rop (Liberal Democracy of Slovenia)
Minister of Foreign Affairs	(2002–2004): Dimitrij Rupel (Liberal Democracy of Slovenia); (2004): Ivo Vajgl (Liberal Democracy of Slovenia)
Minister of Justice	(2002–2004): Ivan Bizjak (Slovenian People's Party); (2004): Zdenka Cerar (Liberal Democracy of Slovenia)
Minister of Defence	(2002–2004): Anton Grizold (Liberal Democracy of Slovenia)
Minister of Finance	(2002–2004): Dušan Mramor
Minister of Interior	(2002–2004): Rado Bohinc (United List of Social Democrats)
Minister of Education	(2002–2004): Slavko Gaber (Liberal Democracy of Slovenia)
Minister of Culture	(2002–2004): Andreja Rihter (United List of Social Democrats)
Minister of Social Affairs	(2002–2004): Vlado Dimovski (Democratic Party of Pensioners of Slovenia)
Minister of Health	(2002–2004): Dušan Keber (Liberal Democracy of Slovenia)
Minister of Agriculture	(2002–2004): Franc But (Slovenian People's Party); (2004): Milan Pogačnik (United List of Social Democrats)
Minister of Environment	(2002–2004): Janez Kopač (Liberal Democracy of Slovenia)
Minister of Transport	(2002–2004): Jakob Presečnik (Slovenian People's Party); (2004): Marko Pavliha (Liberal Democracy of Slovenia)
Minister of Economy	(2002–2004): Tea Petrin (Slovenian People's Party); (2004) Matej Lahovnik (Liberal Democracy of Slovenia)
Minister of Legislation	(2002–2004): Pavel Gantar (United List of Social Democrats)
Minister without portfolio for European Affairs	(2002–2004): Janez Potočnik (Liberal Democracy of Slovenia); (2004): Milan Martin Cvikl (United List of Social Democrats)
Minister without portfolio for Local Autonomies and Regional Development	(2002–2004): Zdenka Kovač (Democratic Party of Pensioners of Slovenia)

=== Bajuk Government 2000 ===
Prime Minister	Andrej Bajuk (Slovenian People's Party – Slovene Christian Democrats, New Slovenia)
Minister of Foreign Affairs	Lojze Peterle (Slovenian People's Party – Slovene Christian Democrats, New Slovenia)
Minister of Justice	Barbara Brezigar (Independent)
Minister of Defence	Janez Janša (Slovenian Social Democratic Party)
Minister of Finance	Zvone Ivanušič (Slovenian People's Party – Slovene Christian Democrats)
Minister of Interior	Peter Jambrek (Independent)
Minister of Education	Lovro Šturm (Independent)
Minister of Culture	Rudi Šeligo (Slovenian Social Democratic Party)
Minister of Social Affairs	Miha Brejc (Slovenian Social Democratic Party)
Minister of Health	Andrej Bručan (Slovenian Social Democratic Party)
Minister of Economy	Jože Zagožen (Slovenian Social Democratic Party)
Minister of Agriculture	Janko Razgoršek (Slovenian People's Party – Slovene Christian Democrats)
Minister of Environment	Andrej Umek (Slovenian People's Party – Slovene Christian Democrats)
Minister of Transport	Anton Bergauer (Slovenian People's Party – Slovene Christian Democrats)
Minister of Economic Relations and Development	Marjan Senjur (Slovenian People's Party – Slovene Christian Democrats)
Minister of Research	Lojze Marinček (Slovenian People's Party – Slovene Christian Democrats)
Minister of Legislation	Tone Jerovšek (Independent)

=== Drnovšek Governments (1992–2002) ===
Prime Minister	Janez Drnovšek (Liberal Democracy of Slovenia)
Vice President of Government	(1992–1993): Jože Pučnik (Social Democratic Party of Slovenia) and Herman Rigelnik (Liberal Democratic Party); (1993–1997): no appointment; (1997–2000): Marjan Podobnik (Slovenian People's Party); (2000–2002): no appointment
Minister of Foreign Affairs	(1992–1993): Dimitrij Rupel (Democratic Party); (1993–1994): Lojze Peterle (Slovene Christian Democrats); (1995–1996): Zoran Thaler (Liberal Democracy of Slovenia); (1996–1997): Davorin Kračun (Liberal Democracy of Slovenia); (1997): Zoran Thaler (Liberal Democratic Party); (1997–2000): Boris Frlec (Independent); (2000–2002): Dimitrij Rupel (Liberal Democracy of Slovenia)
Minister of Justice	(1992–1994): Miha Kozinc (Liberal Democratic Party); (1994–1997): Meta Zupančič (Liberal Democracy of Slovenia); (1997–2000): Tomaž Marušič (Slovenian People's Party); (2000–2002): Ivo Bizjak (Slovenian People's Party)
Minister of Defence	(1992–1994): Janez Janša (Slovenian Social Democratic Party); (1994–1997): Jelko Kacin (Liberal Democracy of Slovenia); (1997–1998): Tit Turnšek (Slovenian People's Party); (1998–1999): Alojz Krapež (Slovenian People's Party); (1999–2000): Franci Demšar (Slovenian People's Party); (2000–2002): Anton Grizold (Liberal Democracy of Slovenia)
Minister of Finance	(1992): Janez Kopač (Liberal Democratic Party); (1992–2000): Mitja Gaspari (Liberal Democracy of Slovenia); (2000–2002): Anton Rop (Liberal Democracy of Slovenia)
Minister of Interior	(1992–1993): Igor Bavčar (Democratic Party); (1993–1994): Ivo Bizjak (Slovene Christian Democrats); (1994–1997): Andrej Šter (Slovene Christian Democrats); (1997–1999): Mirko Bandelj (Liberal Democracy of Slovenia); (1999–2000): Borut Šuklje (Liberal Democracy of Slovenia); (2000–2002): Rado Bohinc (United List of Social Democrats)
Minister of Education	(1992–1999): Slavko Gaber (Liberal Democracy of Slovenia); (1999–2000): Pavle Zgaga (Liberal Democracy of Slovenia); (2000–2002): Lucija Čok (Liberal Democracy of Slovenia)
Minister of Culture	(1992–1993): Borut Šuklje (Socialist Party of Slovenia); (1993–1996): Sergij Peljhan (United List of Social Democrats); (1996–1997): Janez Dular (Slovene Christian Democrats); (1997–2000): Jožef Školč (Liberal Democracy of Slovenia); (2000–2002): Andreja Rihter (United List of Social Democrats)
Minister of Welfare	(1992–1994): Jožica Puhar (United List of Social Democrats); (1994–1997): Rina Klinar (United List of Social Democrats); (1997–2000): Anton Rop (Liberal Democracy of Slovenia); (2000–2002): Vlado Dimovski (United List of Social Democrats)
Minister of Environment	(1992–1994): Miha Jazbinšek (Greens of Slovenia); (1994–2000): Pavle Gantar (Liberal Democracy of Slovenia); (2000–2002): Janez Kopač (Liberal Democracy of Slovenia)

== Members of the Slovenian governments ==
*) The person has been temporarily entrusted with the management of the ministry.

Previous: Socialist Federal Republic of Yugoslavia; Socialist Republic of Slovenia	Government ruling Slovenia and Trieste; 1992–present	Incumbent
Previous: Free Territory of Trieste	Government ruling Slovenia and Trieste; 1992–present	Incumbent
Previous: Representative for Yugoslavia in the United Nations; 1945–1992	Representative for Slovenia in the United Nations; 1992–present	Incumbent
