= Prime Minister of Slovenia =

Head of government

President of the Government of the Republic of Slovenia
- Predsednik Vlade Republike Slovenije
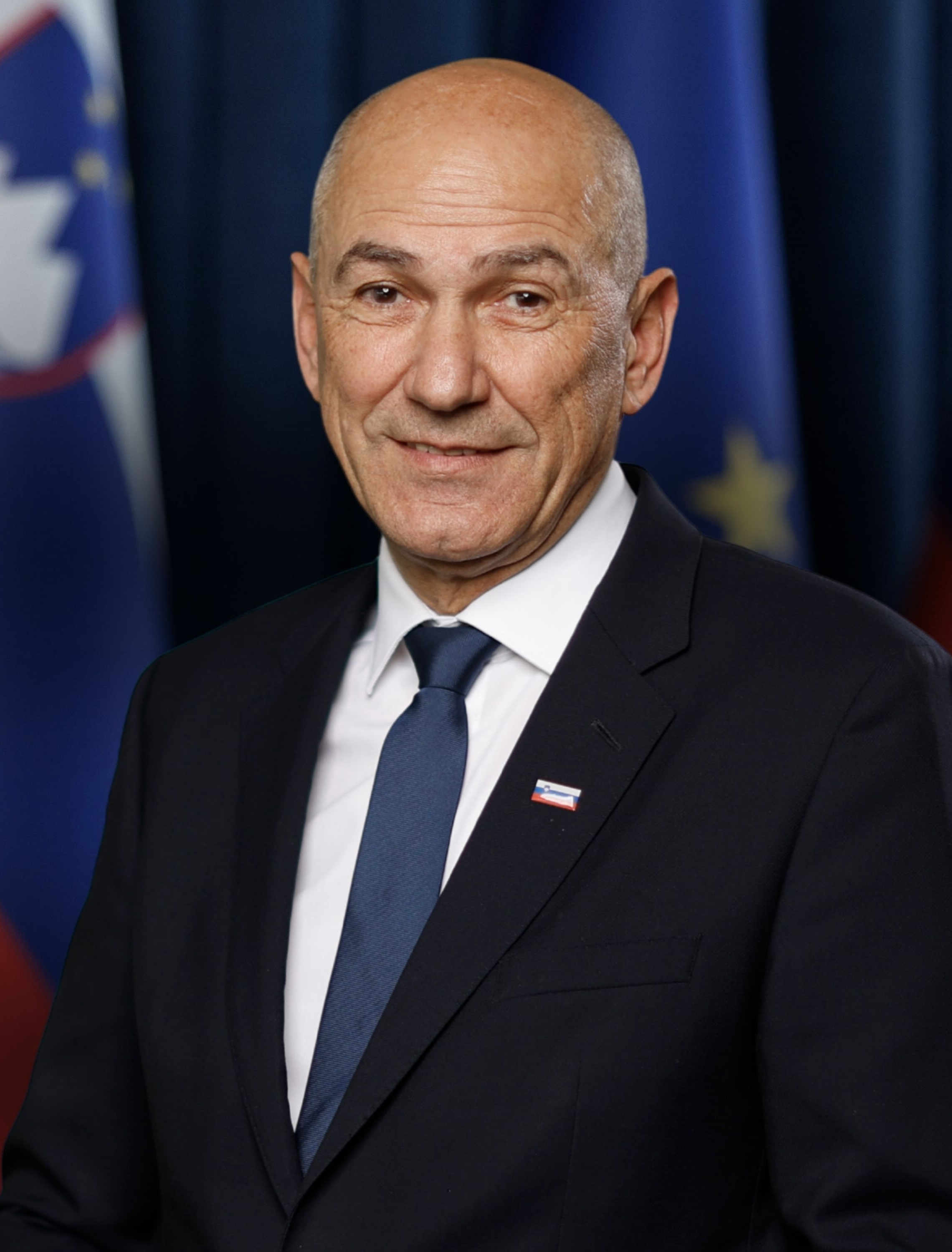
- Incumbent; Janez Janša since 22 May 2026
- Government of Slovenia; Office of the Prime Minister
- Style: Mr Prime Minister (formal); President of the Government (Slovene: Gospod predsednik vlade); Mr President (informal) (Slovene: Gospod predsednik); His Excellency (diplomatic) (Slovene: Njegova ekscelenca)
- Type: Head of government
- Member of: Government of Slovenia; European Council (EU); Euro summit (EU); National Security Council; North Atlantic Council (NATO)
- Reports to: National Assembly
- Residence: None
- Seat: Gregorčičeva 25; 1000 Ljubljana; Vladna palača
- Nominator: President
- Appointer: National Assembly
- Term length: No term limit
- Constituting instrument: Constitution of Slovenia
- Inaugural holder: Lojze Peterle
- Formation: 16 May 1990; 36 years ago (de facto); 23 December 1991; 34 years ago (de jure)
- Salary: €8,900.43 monthly
- Website: www.vlada.si/predsednik_vlade

The prime minister of Slovenia, officially the president of the Government of the Republic of Slovenia (Slovene: Predsednik Vlade Republike Slovenije), is the head of the Government of the Republic of Slovenia. There have been ten officeholders across fourteen periods in office since the country gained parliamentary democracy in 1989 (as well as two between 1945 and 1953, when the office was renamed "President of the Executive Council").

The prime minister of Slovenia is nominated by the president of Slovenia after consultation with the parties represented in the National Assembly. The candidate is then formally elected by a simple majority of the National Assembly. If no candidate receives a majority, a new vote must be held within 14 days. If no candidate receives a majority after this round, the President must dissolve the legislature and call new parliamentary elections unless the National Assembly agrees to hold a third round. If no candidate is elected after a third round, then the legislature is automatically dissolved pending new elections. In practice, since the appointee must command a majority of the National Assembly in order to govern, the appointee is usually the leader of the majority party in the National Assembly or the leader of the senior partner in the governing coalition. The National Assembly can only withdraw its support from a prime minister by way of a constructive vote of no confidence–that is, a motion of no confidence is of no effect unless a prospective successor has the support of a majority. The prime minister is also the president of the National Security Council.

== Election ==
The prime minister is elected by the National Assembly of Slovenia.

=== First round ===
Following the parliamentary election new National Assembly meets at the constitutive session (usually around 2–3 weeks after election; the president of the republic convenes the session after receiving the official report on election from the State Election Commission), after which new parliamentary groups are officially formed. After all groups are formed (usually within few days), the president meets with leaders of the groups for consultations. During the consultations, the president tries to identify a candidate that could secure an absolute majority in the National Assembly (46 votes). After the consultations, the president can officially propose a candidate to the speaker of the National Assembly, this has to be done within 30 days after the constitutive session. Assembly takes vote on the candidate within 7 days, but not earlier than 48 hours after proposal. Candidate has to present his vision of his government before the National Assembly before the vote. When a prime minister is elected, the formation of a new government begins.

=== Second round ===
If there is no prime minister elected, the second round will take place. After new consultations, the president can propose a new candidate or the same candidate again within 14 days of the first round vote. In the second round parliamentary groups and groups of 10 MPs can propose a candidate as well. Vote takes place no earlier than 48 hours from the proposal but not later than 7 days from it. If there are more candidates proposed, the National Assembly will first vote on the candidate proposed by the president, only if that candidate is not elected, The assembly will take votes on other candidates in the order of submission of the proposals. A prime minister is elected with absolute majority (46 votes). When a prime minister is elected, formation of a new government begins.

If the National Assembly once again fails to elect a prime minister, the president will dissolve the National Assembly and call a snap election, unless the National Assembly decides, within 48 hours from the vote, to hold a third round of election.

=== Third round ===
In the third round, the prime minister is elected by a relative majority (majority of present MPs). Votes take place within seven days from the decision but not earlier than 48 hours. In the third round, the National Assembly first votes on all the candidates from the first and second round, and if none of the candidates receives a majority of votes, then it will vote on new proposals, first on the proposal by the president, then on the other in the order of submission. If a prime minister is elected formation of a new government begins, if not, the president dissolves the National Assembly and snap election takes place.

=== Oath of office ===
The prime minister officially takes office after all of his ministers take oath of office before the National Assembly, following the election of government with a relative majority in the National Assembly. The prime minister takes the oath of office after his election.

The prime minister and other ministers take the same oath of office according to the Article 104 of the Constitution: "I swear that I shall uphold the constitutional order, that I shall act according to my conscience and that I shall do all in my power for the good of Slovenia."

== List of prime ministers of Slovenia ==
=== Preceding posts (prior to independence) ===
Province within the Kingdom of Yugoslavia (1918–1941)

No.	Name (Birth–Death)	Term of office		Political party	King of Yugoslavia (reign)
No.	Name (Birth–Death)	Took office	Left office	Political party	King of Yugoslavia (reign)
Prime Minister of Slovenes (1918–1919)					Peter I (1918–1921)
1	Jožef Pogačnik (1866–1932)	31 October 1918	20 January 1919	Slovene People's Party	Peter I (1918–1921)
Presidents of the Provincial Government (1919–1924)					Peter I (1918–1921)
2	Janko Brejc (1869–1934)	20 January 1919	14 December 1920	Slovene People's Party	Peter I (1918–1921)
3	Leonid Pitamic (1885–1971)	14 December 1920	19 February 1921	Independent	Alexander I (1921–1934)
4	Viljem Baltič (1878–1959)	19 February 1921	9 July 1921	Independent	Alexander I (1921–1934)
5	Ivan Hribar (1851–1941)	9 July 1921	3 December 1924	Yugoslav Democratic Party	Alexander I (1921–1934)
Governors of Drava Banovina (1929–1941)					Alexander I (1921–1934)
6	Dušan Sernec (1882–1952)	9 October 1929	4 December 1930	Slovene People's Party	Alexander I (1921–1934)
7	Drago Marušič (1884–1964)	4 December 1930	8 February 1935	Yugoslav National Party	Alexander I (1921–1934)
8	Dinko Puc (1879–1945)	8 February 1935	10 September 1935	Yugoslav Democratic Party	Peter II (1934–1941)
9	Marko Natlačen (1886–1942)	10 September 1935	16 April 1941	Slovene People's Party	Peter II (1934–1941)

Socialist Republic within the SFR Yugoslavia (1945–1990)

No.	Portrait	Name (Birth–Death)	Term of office		Political party
Prime Minister of the Socialist Republic of Slovenia (1945–1953)
1		Boris Kidrič (1912–1953)	5 May 1945	June 1946	Communist Party of Slovenia
2		Miha Marinko (1900–1983)	June 1946	1953	Communist Party of Slovenia renamed in 1952 to League of Communists of Slovenia
Presidents of the Executive Council (1953–1991)
(2)		Miha Marinko (1900–1983)	1953	15 December 1953	League of Communists of Slovenia
3		Boris Kraigher (1914–1967)	15 December 1953	25 June 1962	League of Communists of Slovenia
4		Viktor Avbelj (1914–1993)	25 June 1962	1965	League of Communists of Slovenia
5		Janko Smole (1921–2010)	1965	1967	League of Communists of Slovenia
6		Stane Kavčič (1919–1987)	1967	8 November 1972	League of Communists of Slovenia
7		Andrej Marinc (1930–2025)	27 November 1972	9 May 1978	League of Communists of Slovenia
8		Anton Vratuša (1915–2017)	April 1978	July 1980	League of Communists of Slovenia
9		Janez Zemljarič (1928–2022)	July 1980	23 May 1984	League of Communists of Slovenia
10		Dušan Šinigoj (1933–2024)	23 May 1984	16 May 1990	League of Communists of Slovenia
10		Dušan Šinigoj (1933–2024)	23 May 1984	16 May 1990	Party of Democratic Renewal

=== Prime Ministers of the Republic of Slovenia ===
Legend:

Social democrats (1); SD

Social liberals (6); LDS PS ZaAB SMC LMŠ GS

Christian democrats (2); SKD SLS NSi

National conservatives (1); SDS

No.	Portrait	Name (Birth–Death)	Term of office			Political party	Government coalition		National Assembly	President (term)
No.	Portrait	Name (Birth–Death)	Took office	Left office	Duration	Political party	Government coalition		National Assembly	President (term)
1		Lojze Peterle (born 1948)	16 May 1990	14 May 1992	1 year, 364 days	SKD	I	SKD–SDZ–SLS–SDSS–ZS	Constituent (1990)	M. Kučan (1990–2002)
2		Janez Drnovšek (1950–2008)	14 May 1992	25 January 1993	8 years, 24 days	LDS	II	LDS–DS–SDS–SSS–ZS–ZLSD	Constituent (1990)	M. Kučan (1990–2002)
2		Janez Drnovšek (1950–2008)	25 January 1993	27 February 1997	8 years, 24 days	LDS	III	LDS–SKD–SDS (1993–1994)–ZLSD (1993–1996)	1 (1992)	M. Kučan (1990–2002)
2		Janez Drnovšek (1950–2008)	27 February 1997	7 June 2000	8 years, 24 days	LDS	IV	LDS–SLS–DeSUS	2 (1996)	M. Kučan (1990–2002)
3		Andrej Bajuk (1943–2011)	7 June 2000	30 November 2000	176 days	SLS (Jun–Aug 2000) NSi (Aug–Nov 2000)	V	SLS–SKD–SDS	2 (1996)	M. Kučan (1990–2002)
(2)		Janez Drnovšek (1950–2008)	30 November 2000	19 December 2002	2 years, 19 days	LDS	VI	LDS–SLS–DeSUS–ZLSD	3 (2000)	M. Kučan (1990–2002)
4		Anton Rop (born 1960)	19 December 2002	3 December 2004	1 year, 350 days	LDS	VII	LDS–SLS–DeSUS–ZLSD	3 (2000)	J. Drnovšek (2002–2007)
5		Janez Janša (born 1958)	3 December 2004	21 November 2008	3 years, 354 days	SDS	VIII	SDS–NSi–SLS–DeSUS	4 (2004)	J. Drnovšek (2002–2007)
6		Borut Pahor (born 1963)	21 November 2008	10 February 2012	3 years, 81 days	SD	IX	SD–DeSUS (2008–2011)–LDS–Zares (2008–2011)	5 (2008)	Danilo Türk (2007–2012)
(5)		Janez Janša (born 1958)	10 February 2012	20 March 2013	1 year, 38 days	SDS	X	SDS–NSi–SLS–DeSUS–DL	6 (2011)	Danilo Türk (2007–2012)
7		Alenka Bratušek (born 1970)	20 March 2013	18 September 2014	1 year, 182 days	PS (2013–2014) ZaAB (May–Sep 2014)	XI	PS–DeSUS–DL–SD–ZaAB (2014)	6 (2011)	B. Pahor (2012–2022)
8		Miro Cerar (born 1963)	18 September 2014	13 September 2018	3 years, 360 days	SMC	XII	SMC–SD–DeSUS	7 (2014)	B. Pahor (2012–2022)
9		Marjan Šarec (born 1977)	13 September 2018	13 March 2020	1 year, 182 days	LMŠ	XIII	LMŠ–SD–SMC–SAB–DeSUS, with Levica support	8 (2018)	B. Pahor (2012–2022)
(5)		Janez Janša (born 1958)	13 March 2020	1 June 2022	2 years, 80 days	SDS	XIV	SDS–SMC–DeSUS (2020–2021)–NSi, with SNS support	8 (2018)	B. Pahor (2012–2022)
10		Robert Golob (born 1967)	1 June 2022	4 June 2026	4 years, 3 days	GS	XV	GS (LMŠ–SAB, 2022)–SD–Levica	9 (2022)	B. Pahor (2012–2022)
10		Robert Golob (born 1967)	1 June 2022	4 June 2026	4 years, 3 days	GS	XV	GS (LMŠ–SAB, 2022)–SD–Levica	9 (2022)	Nataša Pirc Musar (since 2022)
(5)		Janez Janša (born 1958)	4 June 2026	Incumbent	115 days	SDS	XVI	SDS–NSi–Demokrati.–SLS–FOKUS, with Resni.ca support	10 (2026)	Nataša Pirc Musar (since 2022)

== Statistics ==
No.	Prime Minister	Date of birth	Age at inauguration (first term)	Time in office (total)	Terms	Age at retirement (last term)	Date of death	Longevity
1	Alojz Peterle	5 July 1948	41 years, 315 days	1 year, 364 days	1	43 years, 314 days	Living	78 years, 84 days (living)
2	Janez Drnovšek	17 May 1950	41 years, 363 days	10 years, 43 days	2	52 years, 216 days	23 February 2008	57 years, 282 days
3	Andrej Bajuk	18 October 1943	56 years, 233 days	176 days	1	57 years, 43 days	16 August 2011	67 years, 302 days
4	Anton Rop	27 December 1960	41 years, 357 days	1 year, 350 days	1	43 years, 342 days	Living	65 years, 274 days (living)
5	Janez Janša	17 September 1958	46 years, 77 days	7 years, 110 days	4	Incumbent	Living	68 years, 10 days (living)
6	Borut Pahor	2 November 1963	45 years, 19 days	3 years, 81 days	1	48 years, 100 days	Living	62 years, 329 days (living)
7	Alenka Bratušek	31 March 1970	42 years, 354 days	1 year, 182 days	1	44 years, 171 days	Living	56 years, 180 days (living)
8	Miro Cerar	25 August 1963	51 years, 24 days	3 years, 360 days	1	55 years, 19 days	Living	63 years, 33 days (living)
9	Marjan Šarec	2 December 1977	40 years, 285 days	1 year, 182 days	1	42 years, 102 days	Living	48 years, 299 days (living)
10	Robert Golob	23 January 1967	55 years, 129 days	4 years, 3 days	1	48 years, 184 days	Living	59 years, 247 days (living)

== Deputy prime minister ==
Deputy prime minister is an unofficial title given to certain ministers in the government (usually leaders of coalition parties other than that from which prime minister comes). Deputy prime minister does not have any additional duties to those that come with the office of minister. There are usually multiple deputy prime ministers in each government.

=== List of deputy prime ministers ===
Government	Deputy Prime Ministers			Took office	Left office
Prime Minister	Name	Party	Other functions in the government	Took office	Left office
I Lojze Peterle	Mitja Malešič		None; responsible for social activities	16 May 1990	14 May 1992
I Lojze Peterle	Jože Mencinger		None; responsible for economy	16 May 1990	8 May 1991
I Lojze Peterle	Andrej Ocvirk		None; responsible for economy	8 May 1991	14 May 1992
I Lojze Peterle	Leopold Šešerko		None; responsible for environment and regional development	16 May 1990	14 May 1992
II Janez Drnovšek	Jože Pučnik	SDSS	None	14 May 1992	25 January 1993
II Janez Drnovšek	Herman Rigelnik	LDS	None	14 May 1992	25 January 1993
II Janez Drnovšek	Viktor Žakelj	LDS	None	14 May 1992	25 January 1993
IV Janez Drnovšek	Marjan Podobnik	SLS		27 February 1997	15 April 2000
X Janez Janša	Radovan Žerjav	SLS	Minister of Economic Development and Technology	10 February 2010	25 February 2013
X Janez Janša	Karl Erjavec	DeSUS	Minister of Foreign Affairs	10 February 2010	22 February 2013
X Janez Janša	Ljudmila Novak	NSi	Minister without portfolio for Slovenians Abroad	10 February 2010	20 March 2013
XI Alenka Bratušek	Dejan Židan	SD	Minister of Agriculture, Forestry and Food	20 March 2013	18 September 2014
XI Alenka Bratušek	Gregor Virant	DL	Minister of the Interior and Public Administration	20 March 2013	18 September 2014
XI Alenka Bratušek	Karl Erjavec	DeSUS	Minister of Foreign Affairs	20 March 2013	18 September 2014
XII Miro Cerar	Boris Koprivnikar	SMC	Minister of Public Administration	18 September 2014	13 September 2018
XII Miro Cerar	Karl Erjavec	DeSUS	Minister of Foreign Affairs	18 September 2014	13 September 2018
XII Miro Cerar	Dejan Židan	SD	Minister of Agriculture, Forestry and Food	18 September 2014	13 September 2018
XIII Marjan Šarec	Andrej Bertoncelj	LMŠ	Minister of Finance	13 September 2018	13 March 2020
XIII Marjan Šarec	Jernej Pikalo	SD	Minister of Education, Science and Sport	13 September 2018	13 March 2020
XIII Marjan Šarec	Miro Cerar	SMC	Minister of Foreign Affairs	13 September 2018	13 March 2020
XIII Marjan Šarec	Alenka Bratušek	SAB	Minister of Infrastructure	13 September 2018	13 March 2020
XIII Marjan Šarec	Karl Erjavec	DeSUS	Minister of Defence	13 September 2018	13 March 2020
XIV Janez Janša	Zdravko Počivalšek	SMC	Minister of Economic Development and Technology	13 March 2020	1 June 2022
XIV Janez Janša	Matej Tonin	NSi	Minister of Defence	13 March 2020	1 June 2022
XIV Janez Janša	Aleksandra Pivec	DeSUS	Minister of Agriculture, Forestry and Food	13 March 2020	5 October 2020
XV Robert Golob	Tanja Fajon	SD	Minister of Foreign and European Affairs	1 June 2022	Incumbent
XV Robert Golob	Luka Mesec	The Left	Minister of Labour, Family, Social Affairs and Equal Opportunities	1 June 2022	Incumbent
XV Robert Golob	Danijel Bešič Loredan	GS	Minister of Health	1 June 2022	13 July 2023

== See also ==
- Government of Slovenia
- President of Slovenia
