= Jože Podgoršek =

Slovenian politician and agrarian economist

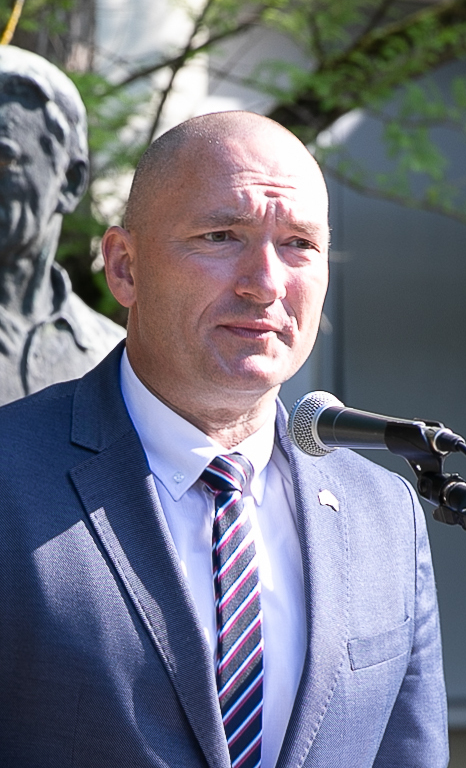

Minister of Agriculture
- In office 15 October 2020 – 1 June 2022
- Prime Minister: Janez Janša
- Preceded by: Aleksandra Pivec
- Succeeded by: Irena Šinko

Personal details
- Born: 17 March 1974 (age 52)
- Party: Democratic Party of Pensioners of Slovenia (until 2021); New Slovenia (2022-)
- Education: University of Ljubljana, Faculty of Biotechnical Sciences
- Profession: Politician, economist

Jože Podgoršek (born 17 March 1974) is a Slovenian politician and agrarian economist who has served in the 14th Government of Slovenia as the Minister of Agriculture, Forestry and Food from October 2020 to June 2022.
