= Janez Poklukar =

Slovenian politician

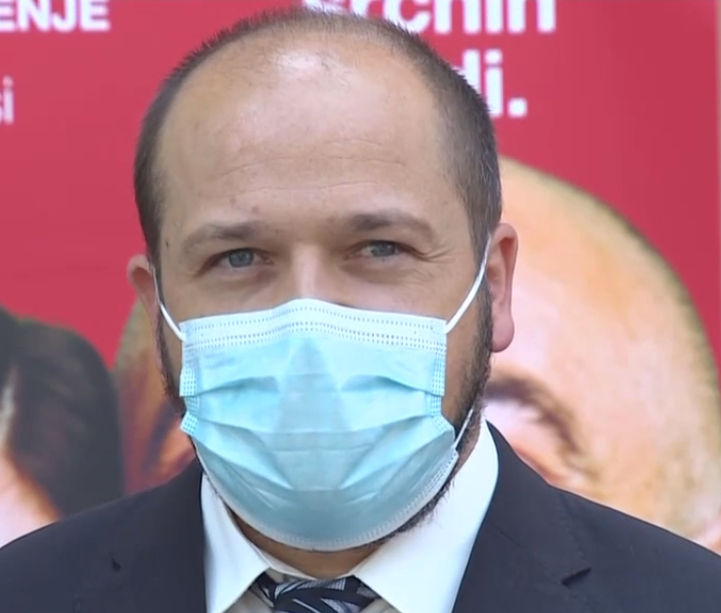
- Janez Poklukar

Minister of Health
- Incumbent
- Assumed office 23 February 2021
- Preceded by: Tomaž Gantar
- Succeeded by: Danijel Bešič Loredan

Personal details
- Born: 9 February 1979 (age 47) Kranj, Slovenia, Yugoslavia

Janez Poklukar (born 9 February 1979) is a Slovenian politician and medical doctor. As of 23 February 2021, he is Minister of Health in the 14th Government of Slovenia. Previously he held the position of CEO in Ljubljana University Medical Centre.

== Politician career ==
=== Local politics ===
Between 2010 and 2014, he was an independent municipal councilor in the Municipality of Gorje. During this time, he held various positions including membership on the supervisory board, chairmanship of the tourism committee, membership on the non-economic committee, and chairmanship of the commission responsible for confirming council member mandates determining the election of the mayor in 2010.

He was active in the Bled Cross-Country Ski Club. Between 2013 and 2017, he was a member of the council of the OŠ Gorje school.

In 2022, he ran for mayor of the Municipality of Gorje in the local elections.

=== Minister of Health ===
On 23 February 2021, he was appointed as the Minister of Health of the Republic of Slovenia in the 14th Government of the Republic of Slovenia with fifty votes in the National Assembly. He succeeded Tomaž Gantar, and at the time, he was led by Prime Minister Janez Janša. During Poklukar's tenure, Slovenia experienced the COVID-19 pandemic, which had a significant impact on the country in several waves. During his tenure, the National Assembly of the Republic of Slovenia passed the Long-Term Care Act and the Law on Provision of Funds for Investments in Slovenian Healthcare 2021–2031.

Political offices
Preceded by Tomaž Gantar	Minister of Health; 2021–present	Incumbent
