= Peter Bossman =

Ghanaian-born Slovenian politician

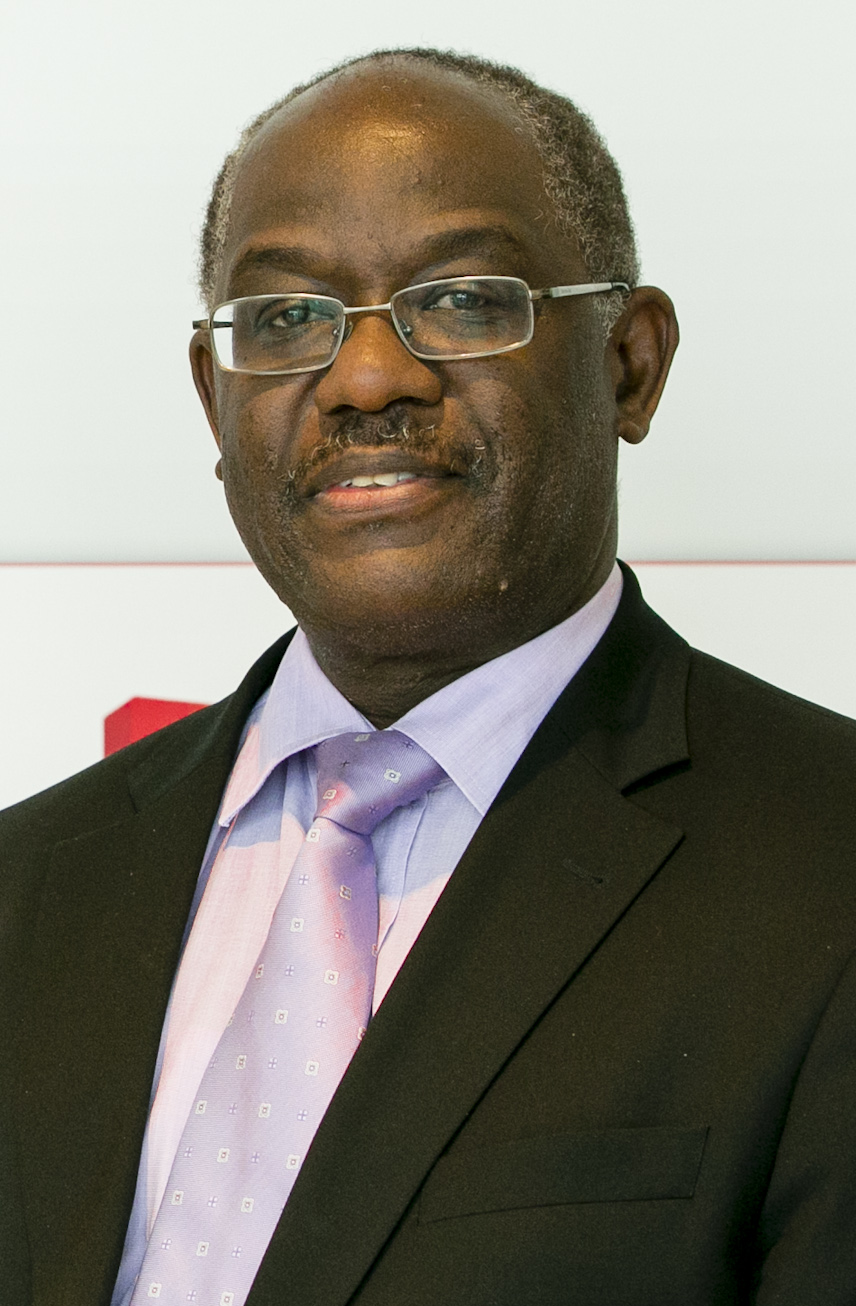

Mayor of Piran
- In office 12 November 2010 – 2 December 2018
- Preceded by: Tomaž Gantar
- Succeeded by: Đenio Zadković

Personal details
- Born: 2 November 1955 (age 70) Accra, Gold Coast (now Ghana)
- Party: Social Democrats
- Profession: Doctor and politician

Peter Bossman (born 2 November 1955) is a Ghanaian-born Slovenian physician and politician. He was mayor of Piran, a city and municipality in Slovenian Istria in south-western Slovenia, from 2010 to 2018. A member of the centre-left Social Democrats, he defeated the incumbent mayor Tomaž Gantar in the October 2010 mayoral election to become Slovenia's first black mayor. In 2011 he was also appointed to the Committee of the Regions of the European Union.

== Early life and family ==
Bossman was born in Accra, the capital of Ghana (then known as the Gold Coast), on 2 November 1955. Bossman came from a relatively well-off family. His father was a politician, as well as a friend and personal physician of Kwame Nkrumah, Ghana's leader from independence. Bossman spent much of his early life in North Africa, Switzerland and the United Kingdom, where his father helped found Ghanaian embassies. Peter is also an alumnus of the Mfantsipim Secondary School in Cape Coast, Ghana.

Following a 1966 coup that saw members of the National Liberation Council overthrow Nkrumah's elected government, Bossman was forced to leave Ghana. He was unable to come to Britain, where he had originally hoped to study, and so chose to come to Yugoslavia, originally hoping to study in Belgrade. He was ultimately sent to Ljubljana, however, arriving as a medical student in what was then the Socialist Republic of Slovenia, within Yugoslavia, in 1977. He has said that he "fell in love" with Slovenia when he arrived, finding it "clean and green". While he was studying, he remained politically active, heading an African students' organisation.

His original intention to return to Ghana upon completing his studies was disrupted when he fell in love with a Croat woman, Karmen Laković, a fellow student. After completing his studies, he and Karmen, also a doctor, settled in Piran, where they run a private practice. They are now married and have two daughters.

== Politics ==
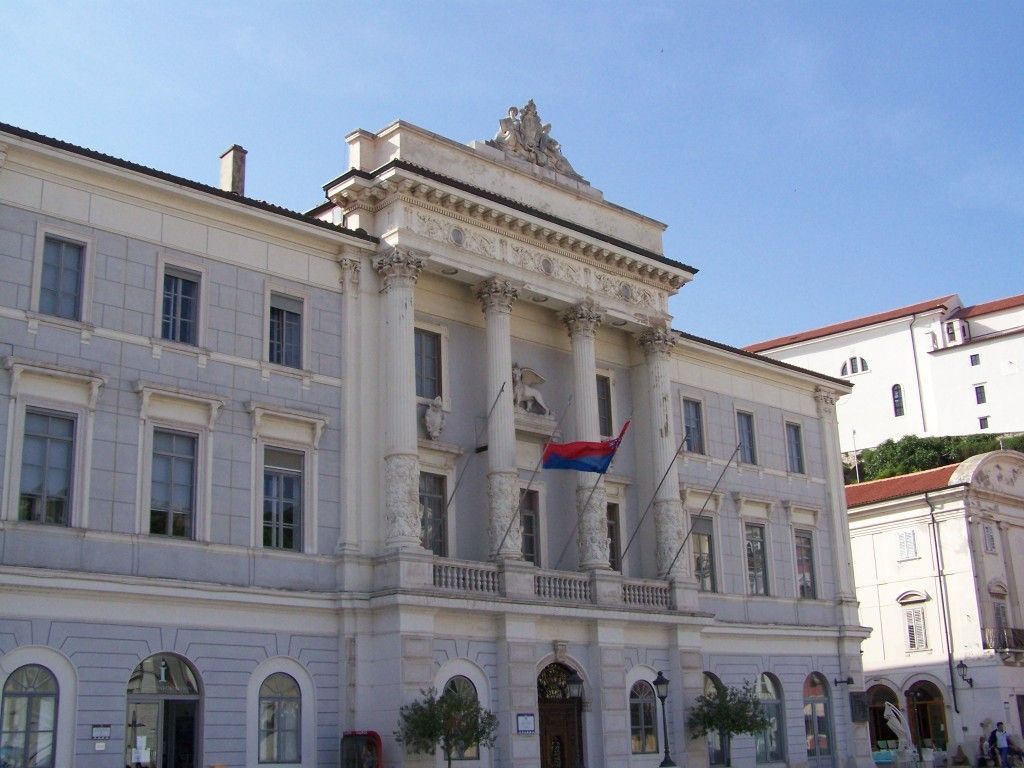
Piran City Hall

Bossman, previously a member of the Piran City Council, successfully ran for mayor in 2010, narrowly defeating his opponent, the incumbent independent centre-right mayor Tomaž Gantar. In the run-off election on 24 October, he achieved 51.4% of the vote, defeating Gantar, who got 48.4%. Unofficial figures following the counting of all ballots showed Bossman with 3418 votes, 185 more votes than the 3233 cast for Gantar. The relatively low turnout, 44% of all voters, was deplored by both candidates.

Bossman's campaign focused on encouraging people to drive electric cars, building a golf course to promote tourism, and promoting local products. He has also pledged to work to try to improve Croatia–Slovenia relations, which have been recently strained over a number of minor border disputes. Bossman has stated that race was not much of an issue during the election, although he did receive criticism on account of his supposed lack of fluency in Slovene. He has stated that a friend, a professor of Slovene, offered to give him additional lessons.

Bossman officially took office at the first (constitutive) meeting of the municipal council on 12 November 2010. His inauguration as mayor attracted more members of the media, including international media, than there were council members present.

Bossman was re-elected for a second term as mayor on 19 October 2014.

=== Reaction to election ===
Bossman's election as mayor attracted international attention. In addition to becoming Slovenia's first black mayor, he has also been described as being probably the first black person to become a mayor in the former Yugoslavia as well as in all of formerly socialist Europe. He was also widely compared to U.S. President Barack Obama, being dubbed by the media as the 'Obama of Piran'. Bossman, however, insisted he had no political ambitions beyond the mayoralty, stating that he intended to return to medicine upon leaving office.
