= 14th Government of Slovenia =

Government of Slovenia (2020–2022)

Janša III Cabinet
- 14th Cabinet of Republic of Slovenia

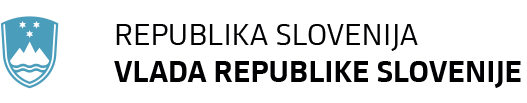
- Date formed: 13 March 2020
- Date dissolved: 1 June 2022

People and organisations
- Head of state: Borut Pahor
- Head of government: Prime Minister Janez Janša (SDS)
- Deputy head of government: Deputy Prime Ministers; Zdravko Počivalšek (SMC); Matej Tonin (NSi)
- No. of ministers: PM + 16 ministers
- Total no. of members: 16
- Member party: SDS; SMC (until 2021); Concretely (from 2021); NSi
- Status in legislature: Centre-right minority government
- Opposition cabinet: None
- Opposition party: LMŠ; SD; Levica; SAB; DeSUS (since 2020, support); SNS (support)
- Opposition leader: Not an official position Marjan Šarec (LMŠ); Dejan Židan (SD); Luka Mesec (Levica); Alenka Bratušek (SAB); Zmago Jelinčič Plemeniti (SNS); Ljubo Jasnič (DeSUS)

History
- Election: 2018 election
- Legislature term: 8th National Assembly
- Predecessor: Šarec
- Successor: Golob

The 14th Government of Slovenia was formed following the resignation of Prime Minister of the 13th Government Marjan Šarec in January 2020. Janez Janša of Slovenian Democratic Party formed a coalition with Modern Centre Party, New Slovenia, and Democratic Party of Pensioners of Slovenia. The government was confirmed on 13 March 2020, amidst the COVID-19 pandemic.

== Government formation ==
On 27 January 2020 Prime Minister Marjan Šarec (LMŠ) resigned following the resignation of the Finance Minister Andrej Bertoncelj (LMŠ) and previously announced resignation of Minister of Health Aleš Šabeder (LMŠ) due to disagreements around new healthcare legislation.

On 25 February 2020 President Pahor concluded the second round of consultations with political parties. Parties that are forming the new government confirmed the coalition agreement which was signed on the same day.

On 26 February 2020 President of the Republic Borut Pahor proposed to the National Assembly Janez Janša as candidate for Prime Minister.

On 3 March 2020 Janez Janša was elected Prime Minister with 52 votes, which means 3 opposition MPs voted for him, most probably MPs of SNS. Jani Ivanuša (SNS) also publicly stated he would support Janša.

On 6 March 2020 Prime Minister-elect Janez Janša proposed to the National Assembly the list of candidates for ministers. Hearings took place from 10 until 13 March 2020. Ministers of the 13th Government worked closely with the incoming formation in the time of transition to inform incoming ministers on the situation related to the coronavirus outbreak. Such coordination has not happened before. Both formations had a joint meeting on 9 March 2020. On 12 March 2020 outgoing Minister of Health Aleš Šabeder declared epidemic. Prime Minister-elect was critical of some decision taken by the outgoing formation.

On 13 March 2020 the National Assembly confirmed the list of ministers and the government took office.

=== Election of the prime minister ===
The prime minister is elected by the National Assembly with majority of all votes. Candidate is proposed by the president of the Republic (1st, 2nd and 3rd round) or by MPs (2nd and 3rd round only). If a prime minister is not elected in the first two rounds, the National Assembly can decide with relative majority of votes, to hold the third round, where only relative majority is needed to elect a prime minister.

Date	Candidate	Proposer	In favor	Against	Invalid	Note	Source
3 March 2020	Janez Janša	President of the Republic	52	31	1	Secret ballot, absolute majority (46 votes) needed	

=== Government confirmation vote ===
After being elected Prime Minister-elect proposes his government to the National Assembly. Government is elected with relative majority. Only after the government is elected and sworn in, Prime Minister and ministers take their offices. Swearing-in ceremony takes place immediately after the vote.

Date	Government	Prime Minister-elect	In favor	Against	Abstain	Note	Source
13 March 2020	14th – Janša III	Janez Janša	52	31	1	Roll call, relative majority needed	

== Cabinet ==
Cabinet level positions are those of Prime Minister, ministers and ministers without portfolio. Others are present at the cabinet meetings (e.g. Chief of Staff to the Prime Minister, Secretary-General of the Government, Head of the Government Legal Service, state secretaries in the Office of the Prime Minister etc.). State secretaries can substitute ministers when absent. If Prime Minister is absent, he is substituted by one of the ministers, usually one of those holding the unofficial title of Deputy Prime Minister. Cabinet usually takes decisions by consensus, but it can also decide with relative majority of votes.

Name	Position	Party	Took office
Janez Janša (born 1958)	Prime Minister	SDS	13 March 2020
Zdravko Počivalšek (born 1957)	Deputy Prime Minister; Minister of Economic Development and Technology	SMC	13 March 2020
Matej Tonin (born 1983)	Deputy Prime Minister; Minister of Defence	NSi	13 March 2020
Jože Podgoršek (born 1974)	Minister of Agriculture, Forestry and Food	DeSUS	15 October 2020
Simona Kustec (born 1976)	Minister of Education, Science and Sport	SMC	13 March 2020
Janez Cigler Kralj (born 1978)	Minister of Labour, Family, Social Affairs and Equal Opportunity	NSi	13 March 2020
Jernej Vrtovec (born 1985)	Minister of Infrastructure	NSi	13 March 2020
Aleš Hojs (born 1961)	Minister of the Interior	SDS	13 March 2020
Andrej Vizjak (born 1964)	Minister of Environment and Spatial Planning	SDS	13 March 2020
Andrej Šircelj (born 1959)	Minister of Finance	SDS	13 March 2020
Vasko Simoniti (born 1951)	Minister of Culture	SDS	13 March 2020
Janez Poklukar (born 1978)	Minister of Health	Ind.	23 February 2021
Boštjan Koritnik (born 1979)	Minister of Public Administration	SMC	13 March 2020
Anže Logar (born 1976)	Minister of Foreign Affairs	SDS	13 March 2020
Marjan Dikaučič (born 1981)	Minister of Justice	SMC	15 June 2021
Zvone Černač (born 1962)	Minister without portfolio for Development and European Cohesion Policy	SDS	13 March 2020
Helena Jaklitsch (born 1976)	Minister without portfolio for Slovenian Diaspora	SDS	13 March 2020

== Government coalition ==
Party		Leader	MPs	Coalition MPs	Ministers	Women Ministers	State Secretaries	Women St Sec
SDS	Slovenian Democratic Party; Slovenska demokratska stranka	Janez Janša	26 / 90	26 / 46	7 / 16	1 / 7	12 / 40	4 / 12
SMC	Modern Centre Party; Stranka modernega centra	Zdravko Počivalšek	8 / 90	8 / 46	4 / 16	2 / 4	7 / 40	1 / 7
NSi	New Slovenia; Nova Slovenija	Matej Tonin	7 / 90	7 / 46	3 / 16	0 / 3	5 / 40	1 / 5
DeSUS	Democratic Party of Pensioners of Slovenia; Demokratična stranka upokojencev Slovenije	Aleksandra Pivec	5 / 90	5 / 46	2 / 16	1 / 2	2 / 40	0 / 2
Parliamentary support
SNS	Slovenian National Party; Slovenska nacionalna Stranka	Zmago Jelinčič	3 / 90	/	/	/	/	/
IMNS	Italian and Hungarian National Minority	Felice Žiža; Ferench Horváth	2 / 90	/	/	/	/	/
Extraparliamentary parties
SLS	Slovenian People's Party; Slovenska ljudska Stranka	Marjan Podobnik	/	/	/	/	1 / 40	1 / 1
NLS	New People's Party of Slovenia; Nova ljudska stranka Slovenije	Željko Vogrin	/	/	/	/	1 / 40	0 / 1
Ind.	Independent politician	/	/	/	/	/	9 / 40	5 / 9
Total:
Government			46 / 90					
Support			5 / 90					
Total			51 / 90			4 / 16		12 / 40

== Composition lato sensu ==
14th Government of the Republic of Slovenia
Position	Name	Party	Took office	Left office
Office of the Prime Minister
Prime Minister	Janez Janša	SDS	3 March 2020	25 May 2022
Chief of Staff	Peter Šuhel	SDS	13 March 2020	1 June 2022
State Secretary (for National Security)	Žan Mahnič	SDS	13 March 2020	1 June 2022
State Secretary (for Cooperation with the National Assembly)	Vinko Gorenak	SDS	13 March 2020	1 June 2022
State Secretary (for Coordination of International and European Affairs)	Igor Senčar	SDS	13 March 2020	1 June 2022
State Secretary (for Health)	Jelka Godec	SDS	26 March 2020	1 June 2022
State Secretary (for Debureaucratization)	Katja Triller Vrtovec	Ind.	20 April 2020	1 June 2022
State Secretary (for Education and Sport)	Marjan Dolinšek	SMC	20 April 2020	1 June 2022
State Secretary (for Military, Defense and Foreign Affairs)	Brig Gen Bojan Pograjc	Ind.	20 April 2020	1 June 2022
State Secretary (for Coordination of Vaccination)	Jelko Kacin	Ind.	18 January 2021	1 June 2022
Secretariat-General of the Government
Secretary-General	Božo Predalič	SDS	13 March 2020	12 February 2021
Secretary-General	Janja Garvas Hočevar Acting	Ind.	12 February 2021	1 June 2022
Ministry of Agriculture, Forestry and Food
Minister of Agriculture, Forestry and Food	Aleksandra Pivec	DeSUS	13 March 2020	5 October 2020
Minister of Agriculture, Forestry and Food	Jože Podgoršek	DeSUS	5 October 2020	1 June 2022
State Secretary	Damjan Stanonik	DeSUS	13 March 2020	5 October 2020
State Secretary	Jože Podgoršek	DeSUS	13 March 2020	5 October 2020
State Secretary	Miran Mihelič	DeSUS	5 October 2020	1 June 2022
Ministry of Culture
Minister of Culture	Vasko Simoniti	SDS	13 March 2020	1 June 2022
State Secretary	Ignacija Fridl Jarc	SDS	13 March 2020	1 June 2022
State Secretary	Vacant			
Ministry of Defence
Minister of Defence	Matej Tonin	NSi	13 March 2020	1 June 2022
State Secretary	Damijan Jaklin	NSi	13 March 2020	1 June 2022
State Secretary	Uroš Lampret	NSi	13 March 2020	1 June 2022
Chief of the General Staff of the Slovenian Armed Forces	Brig Gen Robert Glavaš	Ind.	16 April 2020	1 June 2022
Chief of the General Staff of the Slovenian Armed Forces	Brig Gen Robert Glavaš Acting	Ind.	13 March 2020	16 April 2020
Director-General of Intelligence and Security Service	Andrej Osolnik	Ind.	13 March 2020	1 June 2022
Ministry of Education, Science and Sport
Minister of Education, Science and Sport	Simona Kustec Lipicer	SMC	13 March 2020	1 June 2022
State Secretary	Jure Gašparič	SMC	13 March 2020	1 June 2022
State Secretary	Damir Orehovec	SMC	23 March 2020	1 June 2022
Ministry of Economic Development and Technology
Minister of Economic Development and Technology	Zdravko Počivalšek	SMC	13 March 2020	1 June 2022
State Secretary	Simon Zajc	SMC	13 March 2020	1 June 2022
State Secretary	Ajda Cuderman	Ind.	21 September 2020	1 June 2022
State Secretary	Andrej Čuš	AČZS	18 March 2021	1 June 2022
State Secretary	Aleš Cantarutti	SMC	13 March 2020	3 July 2020
Ministry of Environment and Spatial Planning
Minister of Environment and Spatial Planning	Andrej Vizjak	SDS	13 March 2020	1 June 2022
State Secretary	Metka Gorišek	SDS	13 March 2020	1 June 2022
State Secretary	Robert Rožac	Ind.	25 March 2020	1 June 2022
Ministry of Finance
Minister of Finance	Andrej Šircelj	SDS	13 March 2020	1 June 2022
State Secretary	Peter Ješovnik	SDS	13 March 2020	1 June 2022
State Secretary	Kristina Šteblaj	SDS	13 March 2020	1 June 2022
State Secretary	Polona Flerin	Ind.	1 May 2020	1 June 2022
State Secretary	Vacant			
State Secretary	Irena Nunčič	SDS	1 July 2020	31 August 2020
Ministry of Foreign Affairs
Minister of Foreign Affairs	Anže Logar	SDS	13 March 2020	1 June 2022
State Secretary	Gašper Dovžan	SDS	13 March 2020	1 June 2022
State Secretary	Tone Kajzer	SDS	13 March 2020	1 June 2022
Ministry of Health
Minister of Health	Janez Poklukar	Ind.	23 February 2021	1 June 2022
Minister of Health	Janez Janša Acting	SDS	19 December 2020	23 February 2021
Minister of Health	Tomaž Gantar	DeSUS	13 March 2020	18 December 2020
State Secretary	Marija Magajne	Ind.	1 December 2020	1 June 2022
State Secretary	Alenka Forte	SDS	25 December 2020	1 June 2022
State Secretary	Andrej Možina	SDS	13 March 2020	31 March 2020
Ministry of Infrastructure
Minister of Infrastructure	Jernej Vrtovec	NSi	13 March 2020	1 June 2022
State Secretary	Blaž Košorok	SDS	13 March 2020	1 June 2022
State Secretary	Aleš Mihelič	NSi	23 March 2020	1 June 2022
Ministry of the Interior
Minister of the Interior	Aleš Hojs	SDS	13 March 2020	1 June 2022
State Secretary	Franc Kangler	NLS	13 March 2020	1 June 2022
State Secretary	Božo Predalič	SDS	12 February 2021	1 June 2022
State Secretary	Anton Olaj	Ind.	8 June 2020	29 January 2021
State Secretary	Franc Breznik	SDS	20 March 2020	16 April 2020
Director-General of the Police	Anton Olaj	Ind.	29 January 2021	1 June 2022
Director-General of the Police	Andrej Jurič Acting	Ind.	30 June 2020	29 January 2021
Director-General of the Police	Anton Travner	Ind.	15 June 2020	30 June 2020
Director-General of the Police	Anton Travner Acting	Ind.	13 March 2020	15 June 2020
Ministry of Justice
Minister of Justice	Lilijana Kozlovič	SMC	13 March 2020	1 June 2022
State Secretary	Matic Zupan	SMC	13 March 2020	1 June 2022
State Secretary	Zlatko Ratej	SMC	16 April 2020	1 June 2022
Ministry of Labour, Family, Social Affairs and Equal Opportunities
Minister of Labour, Family, Social Affairs and Equal Opportunity	Janez Cigler Kralj	NSi	13 March 2020	1 June 2022
State Secretary	Cveto Uršič	NSi	13 March 2020	1 June 2022
State Secretary	Mateja Ribič	NSi	13 March 2020	1 June 2022
Ministry of Public Administration
Minister of Public Administration	Boštjan Koritnik	SMC	13 March 2020	1 June 2022
State Secretary	Urška Ban	SMC	13 March 2020	1 June 2022
State Secretary	Peter Geršak	Ind.	28 March 2020	1 June 2022
Government Office for Development and European Cohesion Policy
Minister without portfolio	Zvone Černač	SDS	13 March 2020	1 June 2022
State Secretary	Monika Kirbiš Rojs	SLS	13 March 2020	1 June 2022
Government Office for Slovenians Abroad
Minister without portfolio	Helena Jaklitsch	SDS	13 March 2020	1 June 2022
State Secretary	Dejan Valentinčič	SDS	13 March 2020	1 June 2022
Government Office for Demography
Minister without portfolio	TBD	DeSUS		
State Secretary	TBD			
Slovene Intelligence and Security Agency
Director	Janez Stušek	Ind.	14 April 2020	1 June 2022
Director	Rajko Kozmelj	Ind.	27 September 2018	14 April 2020
Protocol
Chief of Protocol	Aleksander Strel	Ind.	27 September 2018	Incumbent
Government Office for Legislation
Director	Miha Pogačnik Acting	Ind.	20 April 2020	Incumbent
Director	Katja Triller Vrtovec Acting	Ind.	13 March 2020	20 April 2020
Statistical Office
Director-General	Tomaž Smrekar Acting	Ind.	21 May 2020	Incumbent
Director-General	Bojan Nastav	Ind.	21 August 2019	21 May 2020
Government Office for National Minorities
Director	Stane Baluh Acting	Ind.	12 March 2020	Incumbent
Government Communication Office
Director	Uroš Urbanija Acting	SDS	21 March 2020	1 June 2022
Director	Miro Petek Acting	SDS	13 March 2020	21 March 2020
Institute of Macroeconomic Analysis and Development
Director	Marijana Bednaš	Ind.	6 June 2019	Incumbent
Government Office for the Protection of Classified Information
Director	Igor Eršte Acting	Ind.	18 July 2019	Incumbent
Government Office for the Support and Integration of Migrants
Director	Katarina Štrukelj	Ind.	1 June 2017	Incumbent

=== Working bodies ===
Body	President	Party
State Organisation and Public Affairs Committee	Aleš Hojs, Minister of the Interior	SDS
Economic Committee	Zdravko Počivalšek, Minister of Economic Development and Technology	SMC
Administrative Affairs and Appointments Committee	Zvone Černač, Minister without portfolio for Development and EU Cohesion Policy	SDS

=== Other bodies ===
Body	President	Party
National Security Council	Janez Janša, Prime Minister	SDS

== Coronavirus SARS-CoV-2 outbreak ==
On its 1st Session on 13 March 2020, immediately following its confirmation, government set up a Crisis Management Staff (CMS) of the Republic of Slovenia in order to contain and manage the COVID-19 epidemic. Head of the Staff is Prime Minister Janez Janša and its secretary is former SOVA director Andrej Rupnik. CMS is composed of all government members and other experts and civil servants. CMS has Health Experts Support Group. Head of the Group is Bojana Beovič. Jelko Kacin, former minister and ambassador to NATO, is the official spokesman of the Staff, he had a similar role during the 1991 Slovenian war of independence.

Crisis Management Staff was abolished on 24 March 2020, its functions were transferred on the responsible ministries.

=== Crisis Management Staff ===
Position	Name
Head of Staff	Janez Janša; Prime Minister
Secretary	Andrej Rupnik
Spokesperson	Jelko Kacin
Commander of Civil Defence	Srečko Šestan
Head of Medical Expert Group	Bojana Beovič

== Confirmation process and former members ==
Position	Name	Party	Body of confirmation	Confirmation			Source
Position	Name	Party	Body of confirmation	Y	N	A	Source
Minister of Economic Development and Technology	Zdravko Počivalšek	SMC	Committee on Economy	12 March 2020			
Minister of Economic Development and Technology	Zdravko Počivalšek	SMC	Committee on Economy	10	2	5	
Minister of Defence	Matej Tonin	NSi	Committee on Defence	10 March 2020			
Minister of Defence	Matej Tonin	NSi	Committee on Defence	11	6	2	
Minister of Agriculture, Forestry and Food	Aleksandra Pivec	DeSUS	Committee on Agriculture, Forestry and Food	11 March 2020			
Minister of Agriculture, Forestry and Food	Aleksandra Pivec	DeSUS	Committee on Agriculture, Forestry and Food	11	5	3	
Minister of Agriculture, Forestry and Food	Jože Podgoršek	DeSUS	Committee on Agriculture, Forestry and Food	12 October 2020			
Minister of Agriculture, Forestry and Food	Jože Podgoršek	DeSUS	Committee on Agriculture, Forestry and Food	10	0	9	
Minister of Education, Science and Sport	Simona Kustec Lipicer	SMC	Committee on Education, Science, Sport and Youth	12 March 2020			
Minister of Education, Science and Sport	Simona Kustec Lipicer	SMC	Committee on Education, Science, Sport and Youth	10	6	1	
Minister of Labour, Family, Social Affairs and Equal Opportunity	Janez Cigler Kralj	NSi	Committee on Labour, Family, Social Affairs and Disability	10 March 2020			
Minister of Labour, Family, Social Affairs and Equal Opportunity	Janez Cigler Kralj	NSi	Committee on Labour, Family, Social Affairs and Disability	9	8	0	
Minister of Infrastructure	Jernej Vrtovec	NSi	Committee on Infrastructure, Environment and Spatial Planning	12 March 2020			
Minister of Infrastructure	Jernej Vrtovec	NSi	Committee on Infrastructure, Environment and Spatial Planning	11	7	3	
Minister of the Interior	Aleš Hojs	SDS	Committee on the Interior, Public Administration and Local Self-Government	11 March 2020			
Minister of the Interior	Aleš Hojs	SDS	Committee on the Interior, Public Administration and Local Self-Government	11	8	0	
Minister of Environment and Spatial Planning	Andrej Vizjak	SDS	Committee on Infrastructure, Environment and Spatial Planning	12 March 2020			
Minister of Environment and Spatial Planning	Andrej Vizjak	SDS	Committee on Infrastructure, Environment and Spatial Planning	12	6	3	
Minister of Finance	Andrej Šircelj	SDS	Committee on Finance	11 March 2020			
Minister of Finance	Andrej Šircelj	SDS	Committee on Finance	11	8	0	
Minister of Culture	Vasko Simoniti	SDS	Committee on Culture	13 March 2020			
Minister of Culture	Vasko Simoniti	SDS	Committee on Culture	12	5	2	
Minister of Health	Janez Poklukar	DeSUS	Committee on Health	23 February 2021			
Minister of Health	Janez Poklukar	DeSUS	Committee on Health	13	3	5	
Minister of Public Administration	Boštjan Koritnik	SMC	Committee on the Interior, Public Administration and Local Self-Government	11 March 2020			
Minister of Public Administration	Boštjan Koritnik	SMC	Committee on the Interior, Public Administration and Local Self-Government	11	7	1	
Minister of Foreign Affairs	Anže Logar	SDS	Committee on Foreign Policy	10 March 2020			
Minister of Foreign Affairs	Anže Logar	SDS	Committee on Foreign Policy	13	7	0	
Minister of Justice	Lilijana Kozlovič	SMC	Committee on Justice	12 March 2020			
Minister of Justice	Lilijana Kozlovič	SMC	Committee on Justice	8	4	3	
Minister without portfolio for Development and EU Cohesion Policy	Zvone Černač	SDS	Committee on Economy; Committee on European Union Affairs	13 March 2020			
Minister without portfolio for Development and EU Cohesion Policy	Zvone Černač	SDS	Committee on Economy; Committee on European Union Affairs	10	6	1	
Minister without portfolio for Development and EU Cohesion Policy	Zvone Černač	SDS	Committee on Economy; Committee on European Union Affairs	10	5	2	
Minister without portfolio for Slovenian Diaspora	Helena Jaklitsch	SDS	Commission for Relations with Slovenes in Neighbouring and Other Countries	13 March 2020			
Minister without portfolio for Slovenian Diaspora	Helena Jaklitsch	SDS	Commission for Relations with Slovenes in Neighbouring and Other Countries	7	3	3	

=== Biographies ===
Position	Name	Party	Previous political and other positions
Prime Minister	Janez Janša	SDS	Prime Minister (2004–2008, 2012–2013); President-in-Office of the European Council (2008); Minister of Defence (1990–1994, 2000); MP (1990, 1992, 1994–1996, 1996–2000, 2000–2004, 2004, 2008–2011, 2011, 2013–2014, 2014–2018, 2018–2020); President of the Slovenian Democratic Party (1993–)
Minister of Economic Development and Technology	Zdravko Počivalšek	SMC	Minister of Economic Development and Technology (2014–2018, 2018–2020); MP (2018); President of the Modern Centre Party (2019–)
Minister of Defence	Matej Tonin	NSi	Speaker of the National Assembly (2018); MP (2011–2014, 2014–2018, 2018–2020); President of New Slovenia (2018–)
Minister of Agriculture, Forestry and Food	Aleksandra Pivec	DeSUS	Minister of Agriculture, Forestry and Food (2018–2020); State Secretary in the Government Office for Slovenians Abroad (2016–2018); President of Democratic Party of Pensioners of Slovenia (2020)
Minister of Agriculture, Forestry and Food	Jože Podgoršek	DeSUS	State Secretary in the Ministry of Agriculture, Forestry and Food (2020-)
Minister of Education, Science and Sport	Simona Kustec Lipicer	SMC	MP (2014–2018); Leader of the SMC Group in the NA (2014–2018)
Minister of Labour, Family, Social Affairs and Equal Opportunity	Janez Cigler Kralj	NSi	
Minister of Infrastructure	Jernej Vrtovec	NSi	MP (2014–2018, 2018–2020)
Minister of the Interior	Aleš Hojs	SDS	Minister of Defence (2012–2013)
Minister of Environment and Spatial Planning	Andrej Vizjak	SDS	Minister of Economy (2004–2008); Minister of Labour, Family and Social Affairs (2012–2013); President-in-Office of the Council of the EU (2008); State Secretary in the Ministry of Labour, Family and Social Affairs (2000); Mayor of Brežice (2002–2004); MP (2000–2004, 2004, 2008–2011, 2012–2014); Leader of the SDS Group in the NA (2000–2004)
Minister of Finance	Andrej Šircelj	SDS	State Secretary in the Office of the Prime Minister (2005–2008); MP (2011–2014, 2014–2018, 2018–2020)
Minister of Culture	Vasko Simoniti	SDS	Minister of Culture (2004–2008); President-in-Office of the Council of the EU (2008)
Minister of Health	Tomaž Gantar	DeSUS	Minister of Health (2012–2013); Mayor of Piran (2006–2010); MP (2014–2018)
Minister of Health	Janez Janša	SDS	See above
Minister of Health	Janez Poklukar	No party	CEO of Hospital Jesenice (2015-2019); CEO of Ljubljana University Medical Centre (2019-2021)
Minister of Public Administration	Boštjan Koritnik	SMC	
Minister of Foreign Affairs	Anže Logar	SDS	MP (2014–2018, 2018–2020); Director of Government Communication Office (2004–2008, 2012–2013); Official Spokesperson of the Slovenian Presidency of the Council of the EU (2008)
Minister of Justice	Lilijana Kozlovič	SMC	Secretary-General of the Government (2016–2018); MP (2014–2016)
Minister without portfolio for Development and EU Cohesion Policy	Zvone Černač	SDS	Minister of Infrastructure and Spatial Planning (2012–2013); MP (2004–2008, 2011–2014, 2011–2012, 2013–2014, 2014–2018, 2018–2020)
Minister without portfolio for Slovenian Diaspora	Helena Jaklitsch	SDS	

=== Former members ===
Name	Party	Position	Time in office	Reason
Aleksandra Pivec	DeSUS	Deputy Prime Minister and Minister of Agriculture, Forestry and Food	13 March 2020 – 15 October 2020	Resignation
Tomaž Gantar	DeSUS	Minister of Health	13 March 2020 – 18 December 2020	Resignation
Andrej Možina	SDS	State Secretary in the Ministry of Health	13 March 2020 – 31 March 2020	Personal reasons
Franc Breznik	SDS	State Secretary in the Ministry of the Interior	20 March 2020 – 16 April 2020	Driving under the influence of alcohol
Aleš Cantarutti	SMC	State Secretary in the Ministry of Economic Development and Technology	13 March 2020 – 3 July 2020	Personal reasons
Irena Nunčič	SDS	State Secretary in the Ministry of Finance	1 July 2020 - 31 August 2020	Named Acting Director-General of the Financial Administration
Miro Petek	SDS	Director of the Government Communication Office	13 March 2020 – 21 March 2020	Personal reasons
Rajko Kozmelj	Ind.	Director of the Slovene Intelligence and Security Agency	27 September 2018 – 14 April 2020	Personal reasons
Bojan Nastav	Ind.	Director-General of the Statistical Office	21 August 2019 – 21 May 2020	
Anton Travner	Ind.	Director-General of the Police	13 March 2020 – 30 June 2020	Unknown reasons

== Timeline of Government ==
=== Coronavirus pandemic ===
The new government took office in the midst of the COVID-19 pandemic. The period during and immediately after the transition of power was marked by a series of controversial actions and decisions by the incoming government. The government allocated the highest possible salaries allowed by law to its ministers and state secretaries before reducing government functionaries' wages by 30% for the duration of the epidemic.

A state crisis office was created to confront the epidemic. The official Twitter account of the crisis office that was meant to inform the public about the epidemic frequently retweeted articles from SDS's official party newspaper and published an offensive and slanderous statement about four prominent critics of the government (saying that they escaped from a mental hospital and were infected with "virus COVID-Marx/Lenin") that prompted a lawsuit against the institution by the subjects of the tweet. The official explanation for the inappropriate communications – unauthorised access to the account by an unknown individual – was later refuted by the police.

==== Medical supplies procurement controversies ====
The government temporarily suspended public financial disclosures during the epidemic by ceasing to provide the relevant information to the Anti-Corruption Commission which is responsible for publication, thus making the state procurement process opaque to the public. The incident, dubbed "the Mask Affair" by the media, led to conflicting statements from two government ministers about whether the order was pre-paid and whether the masks were en route or actually never existed, and reports of sketchy businesses involved in the public procurement process that were anticipating exorbitant profit margins from the deal.

In a series or revelations, various government and allied politicians were found to have exerted pressure on the organisation tasked with crisis procurement, or influenced/attempted to influence the procurement process in favour of particular suppliers (that were sometimes offering less appropriate or more expensive products, or would be delivering them on a protracted timetable). The revelations prompted in a criminal investigation. After the parliamentary opposition announced its intention to launch a parliamentary investigative commission to look into the potential improprieties, the government responded by launching its own investigative commission which would additionally to the opposition proposal focus its attention on the failings of the preceding Šarec government's handling of the early pandemic response.

On 30 June, investigators from the National Bureau of Investigations carried out multiple searches in connection with the supplies procurement, including of the premises of the Ministry of Economic Development and Technology. The Minister of Economic Development and Technology was briefly detained while the Minister of Interior and general director of police both announced their resignation due to the investigation.

=== Criticism of the press ===
The government decided to carry out press briefings without physical presence of journalists during the coronavirus, a practice similar to those of Austria, European Commission and other.

Janša published a lengthy essay entitled "War with the Media" on his official Facebook account where he expounded on his view on the media. The text was also published on the official government website, and shared on the official Facebook account of the Slovenian government as a paid advertisement. The government's social media accounts were also being used to share other political statements by the PM and to publicise his weekly call-in talk show on the SDS-linked Nova24TV TV channel. In the text Janša discussed the freedom of media and the balance of left-leaning and right-leaning media in Slovenia.

=== Conflict with institutions ===
Upon taking office, the government swiftly replaced the leadership of the police, army, and intelligence services, which was also practice of the majority of the previous governments. The dismissed general secretary of police had just recently been admonished by an SDS politician to "consider her future" after she refused to make available information during a parliamentary oversight meeting due to a lack of legal authority for her to do so. Among the information being solicited were reportedly details regarding a criminal investigation into foreign financing of SDS-affiliated media organisations. The new government politicised the National Institute of Public Health (NIJZ), swapping two acting heads of the organisation in rapid succession after they fell out of favour (the second after saying the government's measures lacked scientific basis). PM Janša disparaged the WHO and called for the resignation of the director general while labelling Slovene public health experts who expressed objections to government public health policies as "so-called experts" and said the government is relying on "common peasant wisdom".

The Ministry of Foreign Affairs sent a communique to the Council of Europe in which it alleged that communist legacy media constitute a majority of the Slovene media space, while the Interior Minister said he "[...] informed EU interior ministers about the media's and political left's fight against the government that is successfully stemming the epidemic. [...]" and listing anti-government protests as an example of such a fight.

The head of the National Bureau of Investigations (NPU) that was conducting the criminal investigation regarding potential improprieties with the procurement process was also summarily dismissed shortly after the investigation was launched. NPU and UPPD were additionally also carrying out a criminal investigation into foreign financing of SDS-affiliated media.

The government also dismissed the head of the national Statistical Office, reportedly because he did not allow an informal government working group (that was tasked with crafting the economic response to the pandemic outfall) to access confidential and highly sensitive raw econometric data collected by the Office. The pre-term dismissal was unprecedented in the nation's history. The board of the Office requested a constitutional evaluation of the dismissal. The dismissal prompted the EU Commissioner for Economy to address a letter to the Slovene government demanding a justification of the dismissal to insure the impartiality and independence of EU national statistical offices. Janša initially justified the dismissal by citing an alleged lack of "responsiveness" to government requests, however, responding to news reports of the letter, Janša responded on Twitter with "[...] I didn’t receive your letter, but press did. @govSlovenia replaced a political appointee as Statistics Office head with an expert with 30 y of experience in this Office. Hope this is the last time you play a political game for Slovenian left. @vonderleyen".

=== Anti-government protests ===
Public dissatisfaction with the government led to a series of protests starting soon after the new government took office, with one protest having taken place even as the negotiations about an SDS coalition government were still taking place. At that protest protester Ludvik Tomšič yelled "Ubi Janšo" (lit. Kill Janša), which was not reported by the dominant media and the police did not take any action. The protests were additionally fueled by the revelations regarding improprieties in the epidemic procurement process. Amnesty International Slovenia found that state actions were endangering the right to protest in Slovenia.

According to polls conducted in May, 52.2% of those polled thought the protests were justified (44.1% did not), and 57% of those interviewed (in another poll) agreed with the demands of the protesters (while 27% did not).

PM Janša labelled the protesters as the "extreme left" in an English-language tweet and claimed that the slogan death to janšism, freedom to the people (a play on words on a popular anti-Axis resistance slogan) that was being used by some protesters constituted a death threat to him and all his voters. The police launched – on recommendation from the PM – at least eight criminal proceedings against protesters for using the slogan on suspicion of making death threats. Janša also claimed that protesters and politicians who support them "are endangering health and lives and spreading #COVID19". SDS used the image of a confrontation between a group of Antifa members and police during one of the protests (that involved Antifa pushing and shoving a safety fence in front of the parliament with police pushing back on the other side) for a cover banner for their social media accounts and a billboard political ad campaign. The Image of the anarchists was tainted red and accompanied with the words "THEY THREATEN, DESTROY..." and contrasted with a photograph of a SDS-supported rally which was accompanied with the words "WE BUILD JOIN SDS".

During a protest Statehood Day "anti-celebration", some 30 pro-government anti-protesters with yellow safety vests appeared on the square where the event was being held and began shouting provocative slogans in an attempt to disrupt the event. Police cordoned the anti-protesters off from the rest of the crowd. Multiple Yellow Wests (as they dubbed themselves) wore clothing and/or footwear and/or had tattoos associated with neo-Nazism, and one was briefly seen making a Nazi salute in a recording of the event. 8 of the protesters were later identified and shown to have affinities for neo-Nazism, with some of them having links to or being high-ranking members of the Slovene Blood & Honour neo-Nazi group. The leader of the Yellow Wests later called on the public to join them in peaceful pro-government anti-protests at the same time and location as the anti-government protests in an "exclusive" interview with the SDS-linked Nova24TV, which also published another article about the Yellow Jackets' call to join their anti-protest (which they termed the "counter-revolution"). Both articles were shared by PM Janša on Twitter. Despite describing themselves as non-violent, the Yellow Jacket shared a meme in which they are described as "unafraid of a physical confrontation". In the Nova24TV interview, the leader of the Jackets – speaking about the risk of a violent confrontation between the group – also stated: "If they wished to attack us, we don't know why they gathered up the courage only after we were separated by police. And despite the police cordon, the anarchists and Antifa chose to stay at a distance greater than a human hand's reach. In fact, they disappointed us, since all those provoking us were retirees."

During the official ceremony celebrating the Statehood Day Slovenian anti-government protester Zlatan Čordić interrupted the ceremony with megaphone and yelled at the President Borut Pahor and others present. Police later explained that due to possible interruptions it had to close the ceremony area because of protection of foreign guests, especially diplomatic corps. Before the ceremony anti-government protesters, among which was director Dejan Babosek, verbally attacked the Honorary Guard of the Slovenian Armed Forces.

== See also ==
- 10th Government of Slovenia (Janša II Cabinet)
- 8th Government of Slovenia (Janša I Cabinet)
- 2021 Balkan non-papers
