= Faculty of Biotechnical Sciences =

Faculty in Bitola, North Macedonia

Coordinates: 41°1′23.51″N 21°19′34.06″E

- Факултет за Биотехнички науки - Битола
- Location: Bitola, Republic of North Macedonia
- Website: www.fbn.uklo.edu.mk

The Faculty of Biotechnical Sciences is a public higher education and research institution in the area of biotechnical sciences, located in Bitola, Republic of North Macedonia. It was established in 1999 and provides education up to doctoral level. Many of its graduates enter the food industry.

== History ==
Formally, the Faculty of Biotechnical Sciences is a higher level of the Higher Agricultural School dating back to 1960. Starting in the 1999/2000 academic year by a decision of the Ministry of Education (ref. 12-2920/2-1999), the Higher Agricultural School became a Faculty of Biotechnical Sciences. The launching of this institution filled a long-standing gap in the higher education system with regard to biotechnical sciences. Since then the Faculty has educated many engineers (bachelor) and masters who have gone on to work in food production. The first postgraduate studies were organized in 2006/2007, in "Quality and safety of milk and dairy products" and "Quality and safety of meat and meat products". From 2009/2010 the Faculty has fully implemented the Bologna Process – the implementation of credit transfer system – at postgraduate level by transforming it to second cycle studies for the three study programs of the Faculty.

== Study and research ==
The main task of this institution is to equip graduates with knowledge and skills for individual managing of small family business in the area of biotechnology. This Faculty is the only one of its kind in the country. The higher education activities of the Faculty of Biotechnical Sciences are organized on different levels of higher education: graduate studies, postgraduate studies, and studies at doctoral level. The Faculty also undertakes fundamental, developmental and applicative research, and runs courses, seminars and workshops for staff and students. The education provided involves application of research results, supports the technical and technological development of the country, and encourages research aimed at creating the conditions for production of high quality food products.

The Faculty of Biotechnical Sciences realizes research and technical cooperation with many foreign and national higher education institutions and other forms of international relations. The Faculty possesses academic autonomy.

== Higher education programs ==
The basic program goals of the faculty of Biotechnical Sciences are:

1. Application of European Credit Transfer and Accumulation System (ECTS) in accordance with the Bologna declaration;
2. Courses organized to create a synthesis of the theory and practice;
3. Enabling students to plan and manage their own knowledge and career;
4. Acquiring knowledge through regular lectures and acquiring skills through practical knowledge and field training related to direct process of food production;
5. Individual study package created by the student, by selecting the courses;
6. Teaching in small groups, emphasizing the student's individual development and preparation for team work and managing groups.

The educational process is conducted by teaching staff of the Faculty. The education process of the faculty is divided in two levels: graduate and postgraduate studies. The Faculty also offers professional education of shorter periods. The language of instruction at the FBS is English.

=== Graduate studies ===
Graduate studies comprise three study programs: animal food processing, management in bio-technique and farm production. These are realized in accordance with the ECTS system and compliance with the legal regulations. The teaching activities are organized in eight semesters (four years) for the first two study programs, and six semesters (three years) for the last study program. Teaching is realized as: lectures, tutorials – seminars, seminar papers and obligatory practical training.

The qualification obtainable is a Diploma conferring the title of "Graduate Engineer". The evidence for the content of the study program is the Transcript of Records, containing complete information on the courses and the grades of the student. The Faculty also issues a Diploma Supplement according to the ECTS principles and the criteria for international recognition and acceptance.

==== First cycle ====
After graduating from the first cycle of studies the graduated students acquires the title: graduated engineer in Animal products processing, graduated manager in Bio-technique, and graduated engineer in Farm production, followed by the name of the study program respectively.

- Quality and Food Safety
- Processing of Animal Products
- Agricultural Management
- Farm Production
- Management in bio-technique

=== Postgraduate studies ===
Postgraduate studies are realized as: lectures, exams and other form of teaching activities. After preparation and defending of the master thesis, the postgraduate students acquire the title of Master of Biotechnical Sciences. The title Doctor of Biotechnical Sciences is acquired after completing doctoral studies and defending doctoral dissertation or only by defending the doctoral dissertation.

==== Second cycle ====
After graduating from the second cycle of studies the graduated student acquires the title: master, followed by the name of the study program.

- Quality and safety of food of animal origin
- Animal products processing
- Management in bio-technique
- Farming and agribusiness
- Farming and agro-tourism
- Farm production
- Farm production – specialist studies

==== Third cycle ====
After graduating from the third cycle of studies and public defense of the doctoral dissertation, the person acquires the title PhD (Doctor of science) in the area of the doctoral thesis.

- Technology and safety of food products

== Staff ==
=== Dean ===
- Prof.d-r Ljupce Kocovski

=== Professors ===
- Prof.d-r Trajan Dojcinovski
- Prof.d-r Dimce Kitanovski
- Prof.d-r Zivko Jankulovski
- Prof.d-r Stevce Presilski
- Prof.d-r Mitre Stojanovski
- Prof.d-r Vangelica Jovanovska
- Prof.d-r Dzulijana Tomovska

=== Docents ===
- Doc.d-r Gordana Dimitrijovska
- Doc.d-r Mila Arapceska
- Doc.d-r Katerina Bojkovska
- Doc.d-r Elena Josevska
- Doc.d-r Nikolce jankulovski
- Doc.d-r Dijana Blazekovik Dimovska
- Doc.d-r Vesna Karapetkovska Hristova

=== R.А ===
- D-r Goran Migajlovski

=== Assistants ===
- M-r Biljana Trajkovska
- M-r Borce Makarijoski
