= Helena Jaklitsch =

Slovenian historian (born 1977)

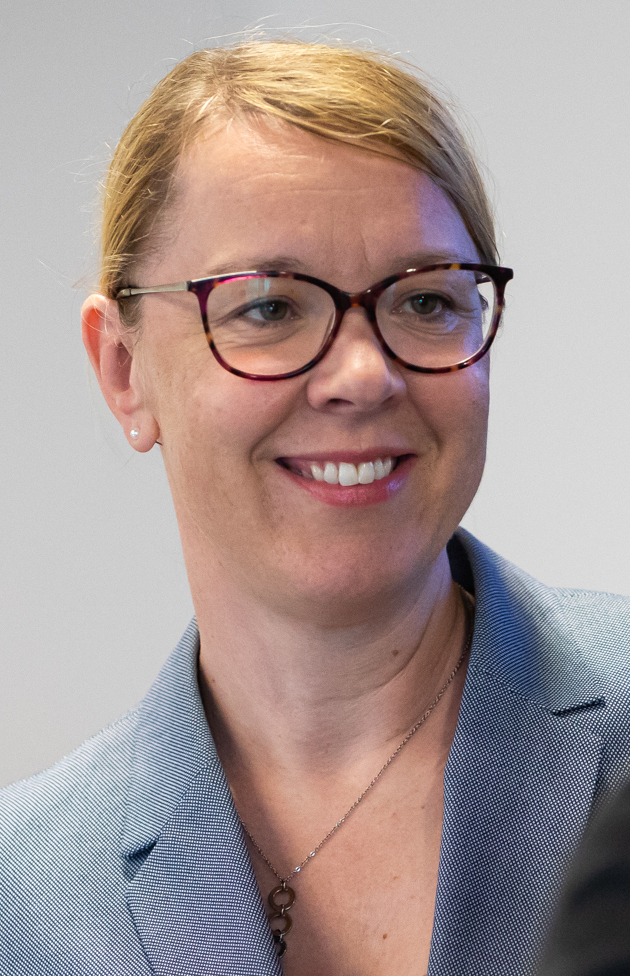

Minister without portfolio for Slovenian Diaspora
- In office 13 March 2020 – 1 June 2022
- Prime Minister: Janez Janša
- Preceded by: Peter Jožef Česnik
- Succeeded by: Matej Arčon

Personal details
- Born: 1 July 1977 (age 49) Novo mesto, Slovenia
- Party: Slovenian Democratic Party
- Education: University of Ljubljana
- Profession: Historian, Politician

Helena Jaklitsch (born 1 July 1977) is a Slovenian historian. Between 13 March 2020 and 1 June 2022 she was the Minister without portfolio for Slovenian Diaspora in the 14th Government of Slovenia.

== Biography ==
She graduated in sociology and history from the Faculty of Arts at the University of Ljubljana in 2002. In 2009, she obtained her master's degree, and in 2016, she completed her doctoral studies on the topic of Slovenian refugee education in camps in Austria and Italy from 1945 to 1950. In 2005, she began working at the Ministry of Justice of the Republic of Slovenia. In 2014, she joined the Ministry of Culture of Slovenia, where she worked in the Department for the Slovenian Language and later in the Directorate for Creativity.
