= Boštjan Koritnik =

Slovenian politician (born 1979)

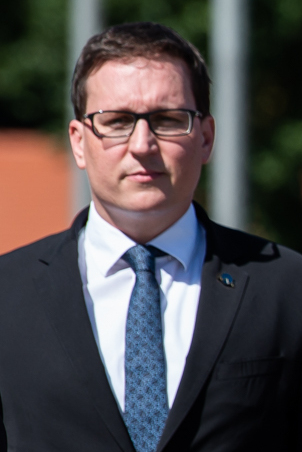

Minister of Public Administration
- In office 13 March 2020 – 1 June 2022
- Preceded by: Rudi Medved
- Succeeded by: Sanja Ajanović Hovnik

Personal details
- Born: 15 June 1979 (age 47)
- Education: University of Ljubljana

Boštjan Koritnik (born 15 June 1979) is a Slovenian politician. As of 13 March 2020, he is Minister of Public Administration in the 14th Government of Slovenia.
