= Zvone Černač =

Slovenian politician (born 1962)

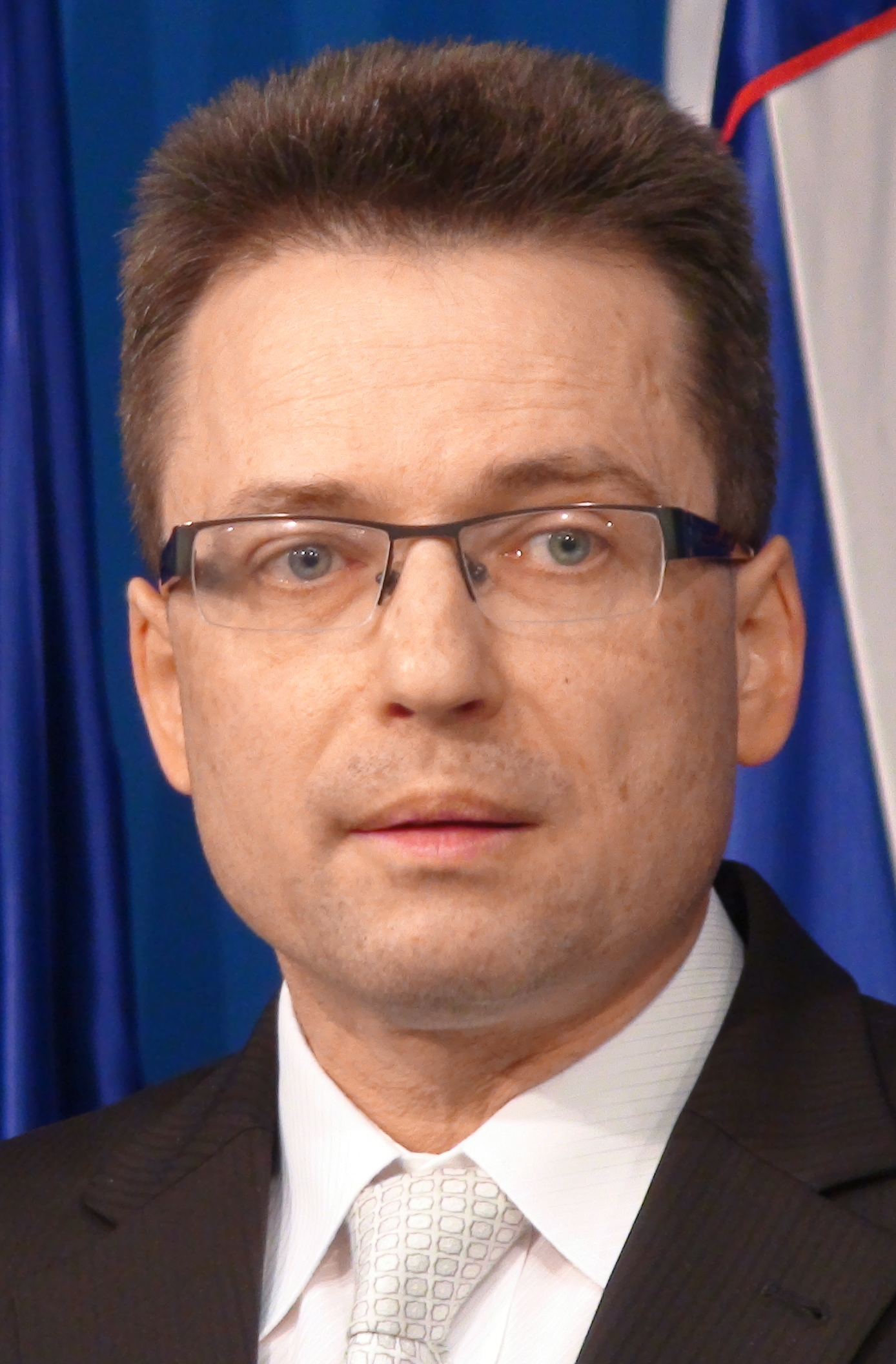
- Zvone Černač in 2012

Minister without portfolio for Development and European Cohesion Policy
- Incumbent
- Assumed office 13 March 2020
- Preceded by: Angelika Mlinar

Personal details
- Born: 23 October 1962 (age 63)

Zvone Černač (born 23 October 1962) is a Slovenian politician. As of 13 March 2020, he is Minister without portfolio for Development and European Cohesion Policy in the 14th Government of Slovenia.
