= Simona Kustec =

Slovenian politician

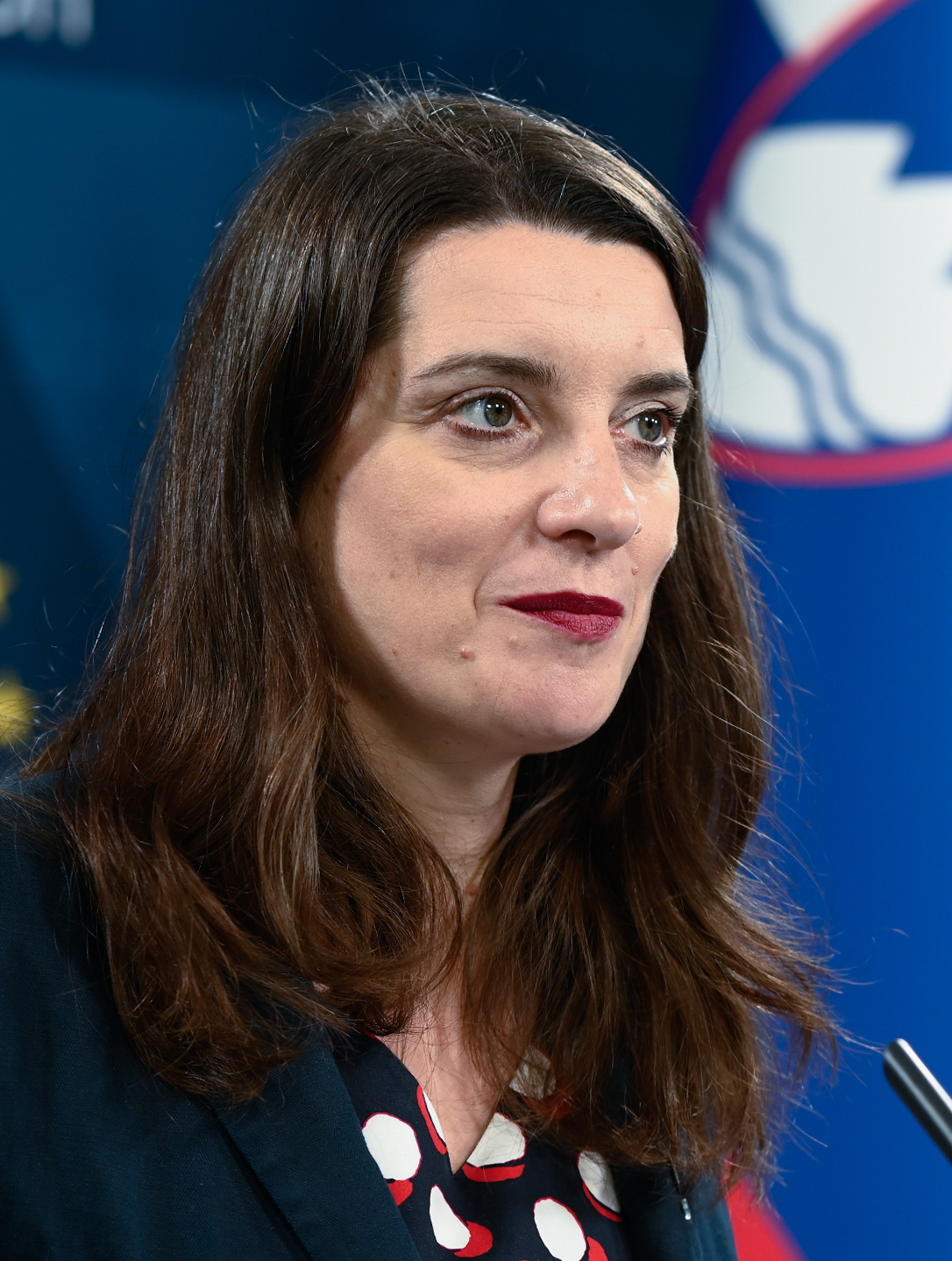

Minister of Education, Science and Sports
- In office 13 March 2020 – 1 June 2022
- Succeeded by: Igor Papič

Personal details
- Born: 19 June 1976 (age 50) Kamnik
- Party: Modern Centre Party
- Education: University of Ljubljana

Simona Kustec (born 19 June 1976) is a Slovenian politician, political scientist and academic teacher. She served as the minister of Education, Science and Sports from 2020 to 2022.

== Life ==
Simona Kustec was elected as a member of the National Assembly representing the Modern Centre Party at the 2014 parliamentary elections. From 2014 to 2018, she led the parliamentary group of the party and also became its vice-president. In 2018, she did not run again, returning to her scientific activity.

On 13 March 2020, she became Minister of Education, Science and Sports in the third government of Janez Janša. She held this office until June 2022.
