= Aleksandra Pivec =

Slovenian chemical engineer and politician

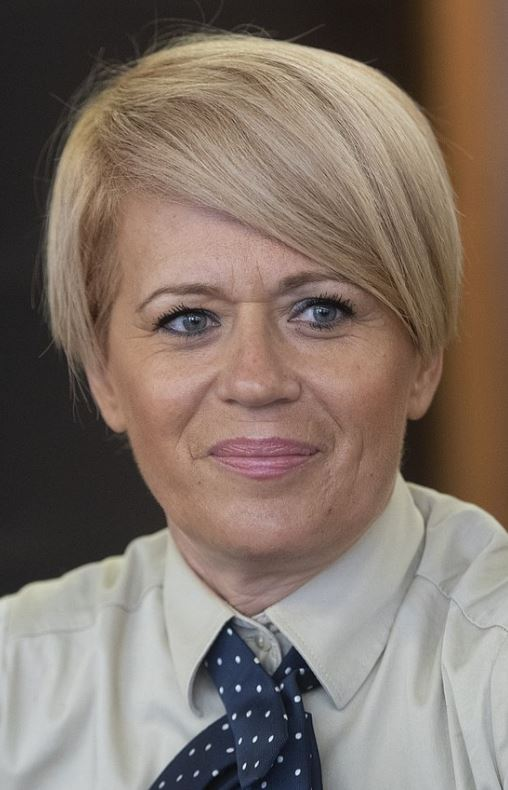
- Pivec in 2018

Deputy Prime Minister of Slovenia
- In office 13 March 2020 – 5 October 2020
- Prime Minister: Marjan Šarec
- Preceded by: Karl Erjavec
- Succeeded by: Danijel Bešič Loredan

Minister of Agriculture
- In office 13 September 2018 – 15 October 2020
- Prime Minister: Marjan Šarec
- Preceded by: Dejan Židan
- Succeeded by: Jože Podgoršek

President of Democratic Party of Pensioners of Slovenia
- In office 18 January 2020 – 9 September 2020
- Preceded by: Karl Erjavec
- Succeeded by: Karl Erjavec

President of Our Country
- In office 20 March 2021 – present

Personal details
- Born: 26 March 1972 (age 54) Ptuj, SFR Yugoslavia
- Party: DeSUS (until 2020); Our Country (2021–present)
- Education: University of Ljubljana
- Profession: Chemical engineer, politician

Aleksandra Pivec (born 26 March 1972) is a Slovenian chemical engineer and politician who served as the country's Minister of Agriculture, Forestry and Food from 2018 to 2020 and Deputy Prime Minister from March to October 2020.

== Early life and education ==
Pivec was born on 26 March 1972 in Ptuj. Her family is known for wine-making.

Pivec has a Bachelor of Science and a PhD in chemical engineering from the University of Ljubljana. Her thesis was on the optimisation of wine fermentation processes.

== Career ==
Pivec worked at the Scientific Research Centre Bistra Ptuj for 17 years, including 6 years as its director. She served as state secretary at the Government Office for Slovenians Abroad from 2016 before being appointed Minister for Agriculture in the government of Marjan Šarec on 13 September 2018. She gained wide media exposure as a minister, appearing at numerous events across the country.

Pivec became leader of the Democratic Party of Pensioners of Slovenia on 18 January 2020, defeating Defence Minister Karl Erjavec, who then resigned. In the campaign leading up to the election, the media had focused on Pivec's failure to report money she made consulting for a state-funded tourism project to the anti-graft commission as required by law. She became Deputy Prime Minister in the government of Prime Minister Janez Janša on 13 March 2020.

== Publications ==
- Berovič, Marin; Pivec, Aleksandra; Košmerl, Tatjana; Wondra, Mojmir; Čelan, Štefan (February 2007). "Influence of heat shock on glycerol production in alcohol fermentation". Journal of Bioscience and Bioengineering. 103 (2): 135–139. doi:10.1263/jbb.103.135. PMID 17368395.
- Kostevšek, Anja; Petek, Janez; Čuček, Lidija; Pivec, Aleksandra (1 October 2013). "Conceptual design of a municipal energy and environmental system as an efficient basis for advanced energy planning". Energy. 60: 148–158. doi:10.1016/j.energy.2013.07.044.
- Kostevšeka, Anja; Cizelj, Leon; Petek, Janez; Pivec, Aleksandra (December 2013). "A novel concept for a renewable network within municipal energy systems". Renewable Energy. 60: 79–87. doi:10.1016/j.renene.2013.04.013.
