= Karl Erjavec =

Slovenian lawyer and politician

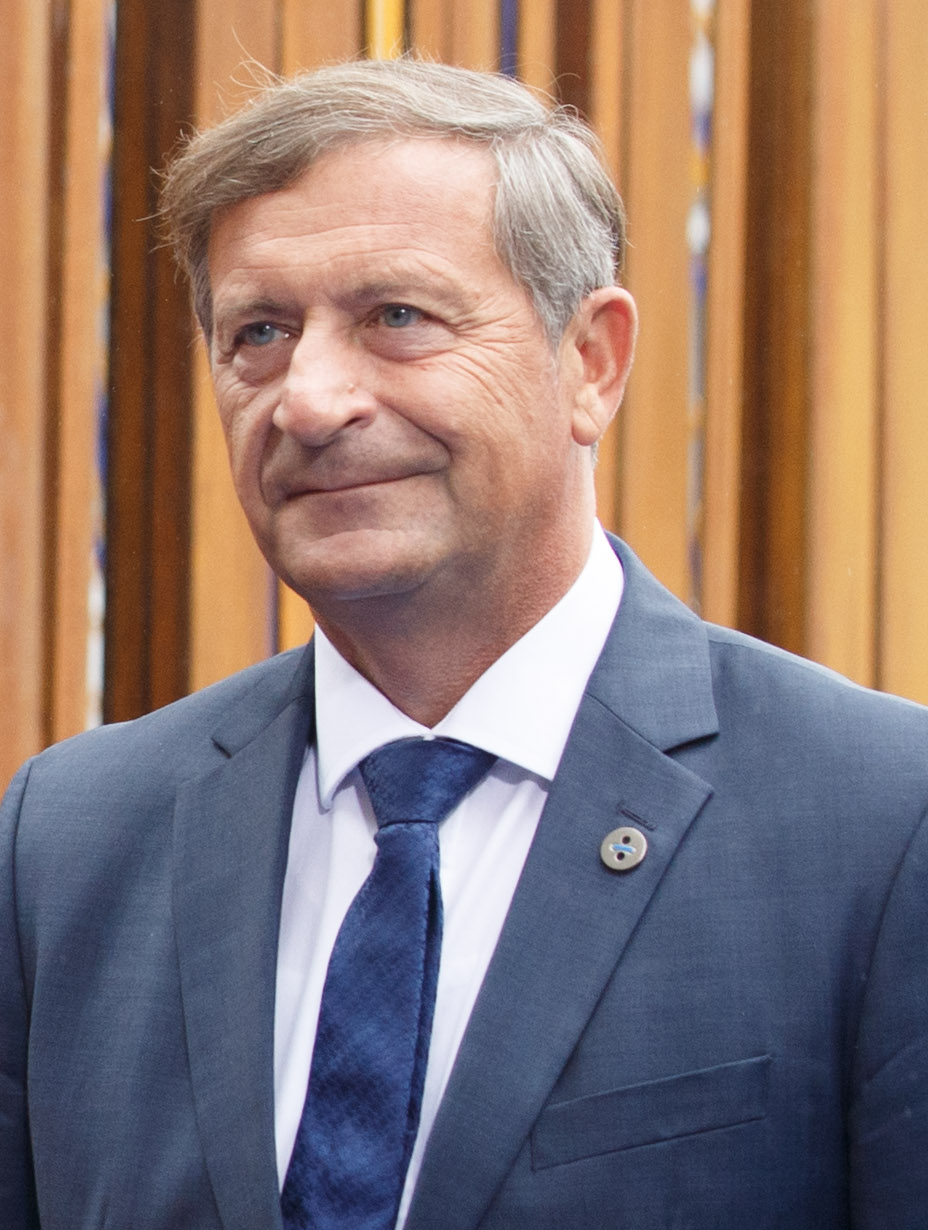

Deputy Prime Minister of Slovenia
- In office 13 September 2018 – 13 March 2020 Serving with Alenka Bratušek, Miro Cerar, Andrej Bertoncelj, and Jernej Pikalo
- President: Borut Pahor
- Prime Minister: Marjan Šarec
- Preceded by: Himself; Dejan Židan; Boris Koprivnikar
- Succeeded by: Zdravko Počivalšek; Matej Tonin; Aleksandra Pivec

Minister of Defence
- In office 13 September 2018 – 13 March 2020
- Prime Minister: Marjan Šarec
- Preceded by: Andreja Katič
- Succeeded by: Matej Tonin
- In office 9 November 2004 – 21 November 2008
- Prime Minister: Janez Janša
- Preceded by: Anton Grizold
- Succeeded by: Ljubica Jelušič

Minister of Foreign Affairs
- In office 10 February 2012 – 14 September 2018
- Prime Minister: Janez Janša; Alenka Bratušek; Miro Cerar
- Preceded by: Samuel Žbogar
- Succeeded by: Miro Cerar

Minister of Environment and Spatial Planning
- In office 21 November 2008 – 12 February 2010
- Appointed by: Borut Pahor
- Preceded by: Janez Podobnik
- Succeeded by: Roko Žarnić

Personal details
- Born: 21 June 1960 (age 66) Aiseau, Belgium
- Party: DeSUS (until 2021)
- Education: University of Ljubljana

Karl Viktor Erjavec (born 21 June 1960) is a Slovenian lawyer and politician who served in the government of Slovenia as Minister of Foreign Affairs from 2012 to 2018. He was the president of the Democratic Party of Pensioners of Slovenia, having held the position from 2005 to January 2020 and again from December 2020 until March 2021. He was Minister of Defense from 2004 to 2008 and 2018 to 2020 and Minister of Environment and Spatial Planning from 2008 to 2010.

== Early life and public servant ==
Erjavec was born in Aiseau, Belgium, into a family of Slovene immigrants. He moved to Slovenia in 1972, then SFR Yugoslavia, when the family returned home. He graduated from the Faculty of Law at the University of Ljubljana in 1985 under the supervision of the renowned legal expert Rajko Pirnat. He entered public service after democratisation in 1990, when the new democratic municipal authorities of the town of Kranj named him as head of the local administration. In 1993, he joined the Slovene Christian Democrats. Between 1995 and 2000, he worked as the secretary of the Slovenian ombudsman Ivo Bizjak, his party colleague. In 2000, when Bizjak was named as Minister of Justice in the centre-left government of Janez Drnovšek, Erjavec became the secretary at the ministry. During this period, he rose to prominence because of his decisive actions against corruption in the justice system.

In 2000, the Slovene Christian Democrats merged with the Slovenian People's Party, and Erjavec was a member of the latter until 2004. When the Slovene People's Party left Anton Rop's government prior to the 2004 parliamentary election, Erjavec quit the party and joined the Liberal Democracy of Slovenia, then the largest coalition government.

== Political career ==
Just before the parliamentary election of 2004, Erjavec joined the Democratic Party of Pensioners of Slovenia. The same year, he was elected to the Slovenian National Assembly. When his party joined the centre right government coalition of Janez Janša, Erjavec became Minister of Defence. In 2005, he was elected president of the Democratic Party of Pensioners. After the parliamentary election of 2008, the party entered the left wing government coalition of Borut Pahor, and Erjavec was named Minister of the Environment and Spatial Planning.

On 26 January 2010, Erjavec announced his resignation in the National Assembly, and on 27 January 2010, he officially resigned in a letter to the Prime Minister. That happened after several months of political pressures that centered primarily on the demand of the Court of Audit of the Republic of Slovenia for the dismissal of Erjavec as he failed to secure an efficient waste management system. His resignation became valid on 2 February 2010, after the Prime Minister informed the National Assembly about it. On 12 February 2010, Erjavec was succeeded by Roko Žarnić. In January 2011, Žarnić stated that his predecessor had too little time to settle the issue of waste.

In December 2011, he was elected to the National Assembly as a deputy. In February 2012, he was appointed Minister of Foreign Affairs in the center-right coalition government of Janez Janša. He continued to serve in that position in the following Bratušek and Cerar governments until 2018. From September 2018 to March 2020 he served as Minister of Defence in the Šarec government. At the January 2020 DeSUS party congress he was defeated by Aleksandra Pivec after which he declared his retirement from politics, but he returned to party leadership in December 2020 after she was made to resign by the party. After his reappointment he announced that he had no interest in serving in Janša's 3rd government (which his party had joined under Pivec) and began the process of withdrawing DeSUS from the government coalition.

== See also ==
- List of foreign ministers in 2017

Political offices
Preceded by Anton Grizold	Minister of Defence; 2004–2008	Succeeded by Ljubica Jelušič
Preceded by Janez Podobnik	Minister of Environment and Spatial Planning; 2008–2010	Succeeded by Roko Žarnić
Preceded by Samuel Žbogar	Minister of Foreign Affairs; 2012–2018	Succeeded by Miro Cerar
