= Danijel Bešič Loredan =

Slovenian politician

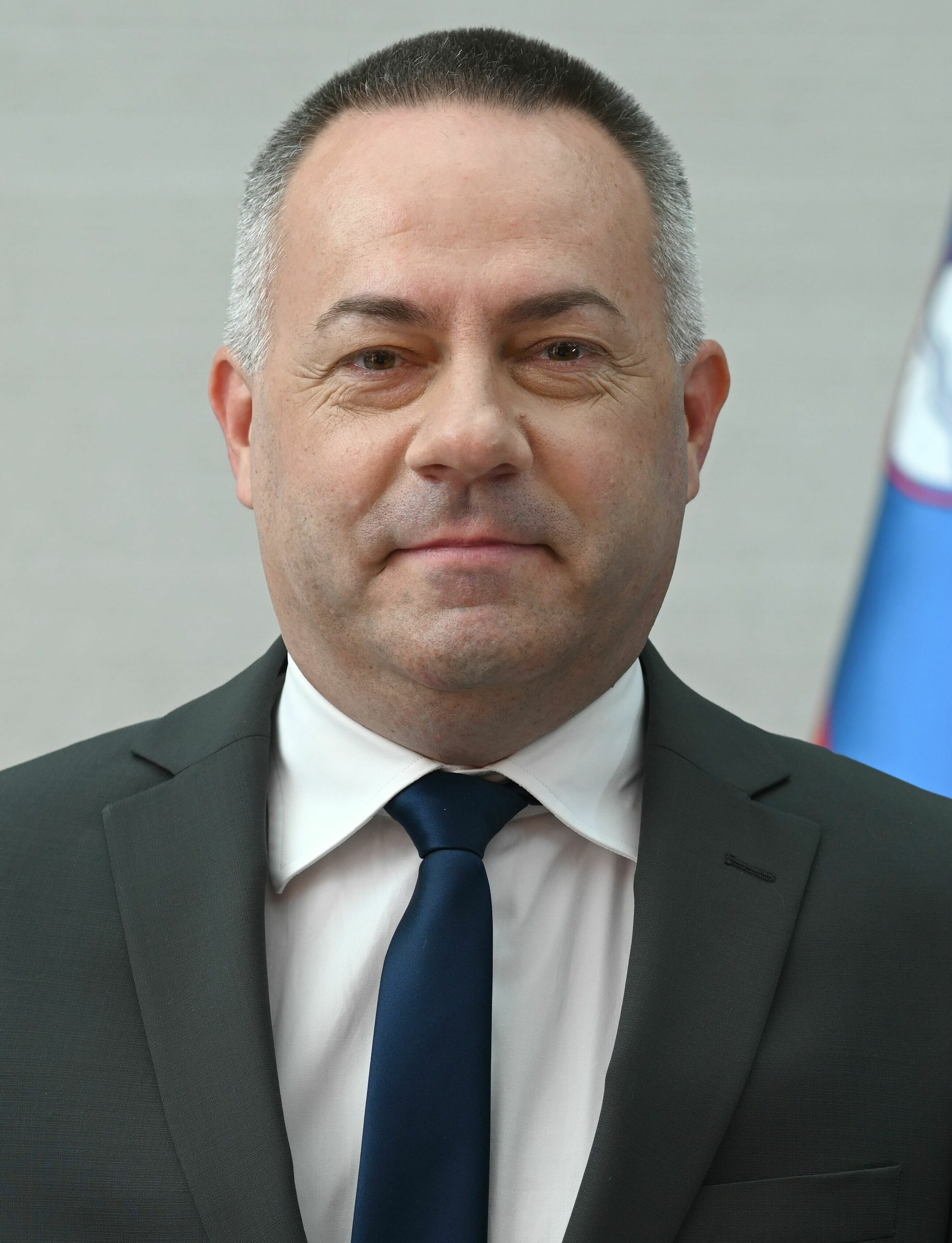
- Bešič Loredan in 2022

Deputy Prime Minister and Minister of Health of Slovenia
- In office June 1, 2022 – July 7, 2023
- Prime Minister: Robert Golob

Personal details
- Born: May 18, 1973 (age 52) Koper, Slovenia
- Party: Freedom Movement (Slovenia)

Danijel Bešič Loredan (born 18 May 1973) is a Slovenian orthopedic surgeon and politician. He served as the deputy prime minister and minister of health of Slovenia in the cabinet of Robert Golob between 2022 and 2023.

== Early life and career ==
Loredan was born in Koper, Slovenia on May 18, 1973. After his education, he worked at the Ljubljana University Medical Centre. While serving there, he worked as a specialist and later was transferred Valdoltra Orthopedic Hospital as a specialist. In 2016, he was employed at the Splošna bolnišnica Dr. Franca Derganca Nova Gorica for two years as the head of the Orthopedic department in the hospital.

In 2018, he formed a political group named Movement Together Forward. In February 2018, the movement began collecting signatures for an online petition for the resignation of Health Minister Milojka Kolar Celarc. The movement also participated in the 2018 Slovenian parliamentary election and reached 0.49% of the vote.

On June 1, 2022, he was elected Deputy Prime Minister and Minister of Health in the Republic of Slovenia.

== Controversy ==
In November 2021, the acting director of the Nova Gorica General Hospital, Ernest Gortan, banned him from working in the hospital before the termination of his employment, alleging that he did not arrange the transfer of patients to other hospitals. Thus, he did not stop the operations and opposed the relocation of COVID patients to orthopedic facilities. After the appeal, only a reprimand was issued to him, Bešič Loredan returned to the hospital in mid-December. In January 2022, he terminated his employment at the hospital at his own request.
