= Radovan Žerjav =

Slovenian politician

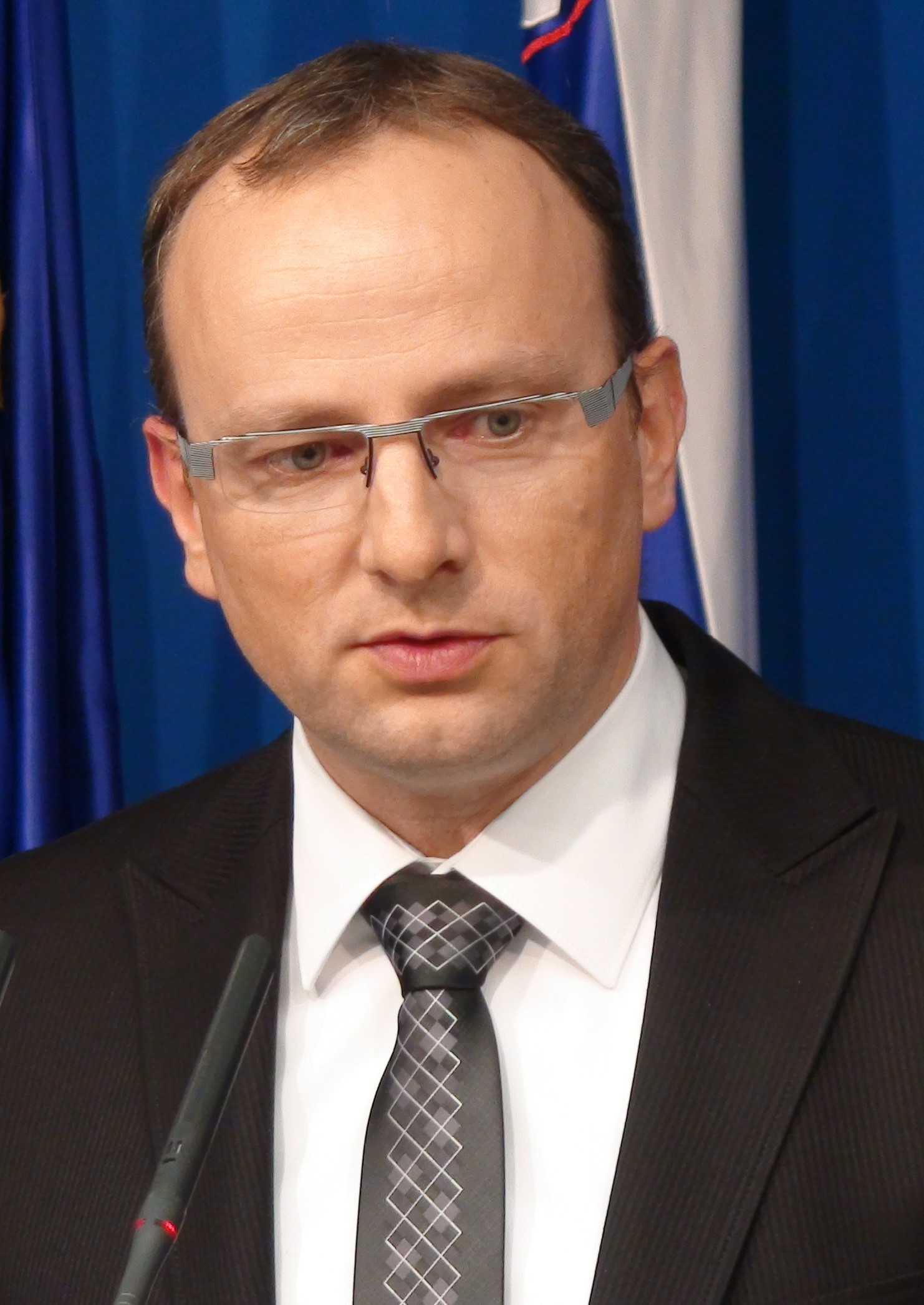
Radovan Žerjav

Radovan Žerjav (born 2 December 1968) is a Slovenian conservative politician. Between 2007 and 2008 he served as Minister of Transport. During the second term under Janez Janša, he in 2012 served as Minister of Economic Development and Technology, which he left since Janša was ignoring the 2012–2013 Investigation Report on the parliamentary parties' leaders by Commission for the Prevention of Corruption of the Republic of Slovenia. Since 2009, he has been the Chairman of the Slovenian People's Party and a deputy in the National Assembly.

Žerjav was born in Maribor, Slovenia, then part of the Socialist Federal Republic of Yugoslavia. He spent his childhood in the Prekmurje region of eastern Slovenia. He attended a bilingual Slovene-Hungarian primary school in Lendava, and high school in Murska Sobota. In 1988, he enrolled in the University of Maribor, graduating from chemical engineering in 1993. In 1996, he continued his studies, and in 2003, he received his master's degree in chemical engineering.

After having finished his studies, he took up the job at the oil company Nafta Lendava. In 1999, he became the head of development in the company, and as of 2004 he became Assistant Director of Nafta Lendava for the technical sector. In 2007, he was appointed Director of Nafta Biodizel, established with the purpose to set up the bio-diesel production within the group of Nafta Lendava.

In September 2007, he was appointed Minister of Transport in the center-right government of Janez Janša. In the parliamentary election of 2008, he was elected to the Slovenian National Assembly. In March 2009, he was elected Chairman of the Slovenian People's Party.

Besides Slovene, he is fluent in German, English and Serbo-Croatian and also has a basic knowledge of Hungarian.

Political offices
Preceded by Janez Božič	Minister of Transport of the Republic of Slovenia; 2007 – 2008	Succeeded by Patrick Vlačič
Preceded by Mitja Gaspari	Minister of Economic Development and Technology; 2012 – current	Succeeded by incumbent
Party political offices
Preceded by Bojan Šrot	President of the Slovenian People's Party; 2009 – current	Succeeded by incumbent
