= Tomaž Gantar =

Slovenian politician (born 1960)

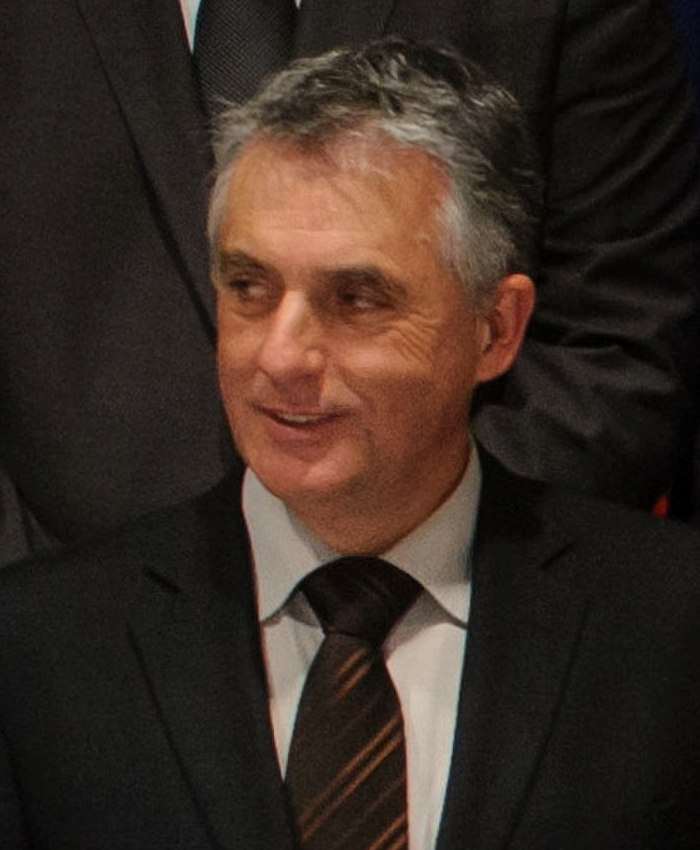
- Gantar in 2013

Minister of Health
- In office 13 March 2020 – 18 December 2020

Personal details
- Born: 21 March 1960 (age 66)

Tomaž Gantar (born 21 March 1960) is a Slovenian politician. He was the Minister of Health in Slovenia from 13 March 2020 to 18 December 2020 in the 14th Government of Slovenia. He was also the temporary representative of The Democratic Party of Pensioners of Slovenia from September to December 2020.
