= Democratic Party of Pensioners of Slovenia =

Slovene political party

Democratic Party of Pensioners of Slovenia Demokratična stranka upokojencev Slovenije
- Leader: Vlado Dimovski
- Founded: 1991
- Dissolved: 17 May 2025
- Merged into: Party of Generations
- Headquarters: Ljubljana
- Membership (2015): 11,972
- Ideology: Pensioners' interests Single-issue politics Pro-Europeanism
- Political position: Centre
- European affiliation: European Democratic Party
- Colours: Green Blue

Website
- desus.si

The Democratic Party of Pensioners of Slovenia (Slovene: Demokratična stranka upokojencev Slovenije, also known by the acronym DeSUS) was a political party in Slovenia last led by Vlado Dimovski. The party claimed broadly liberal values with a strong focus on the interests of the retired and the elderly. Despite being part of virtually every governmental coalition of Slovenia since it started appearing on voting ballots, the party only secured 0.66% of all votes at the Slovenian parliamentary election in 2022 and thus failed to secure any seats in the National Assembly.

The party joined the European Democratic Party in February 2019.

The party merged with Good State (Dobra država, DD) in 2025 to form the Party of Generations.

== Overview ==
DeSUS was founded in 1991 and first entered the National Assembly of Slovenia after the 1996 Slovenian parliamentary election. Since that election, DeSUS was a member of every government coalition, with the exception of the brief Bajuk minority government which lasted from June to November 2000, until 2020. From May 2005 until 2020 the party was led by Karl Erjavec, who served in various ministerial positions for most of those 15 years, making him almost synonymous with the party itself as well as one of the most recognisable politicians in Slovenia. At the party congress in January 2020, he was defeated by Agriculture minister Aleksandra Pivec who thereby assumed the leadership of the party. Upon his loss, Erjavec announced he would be leaving politics but remain an active DeSUS member. After the resignation of the Marjan Šarec minority government, DeSUS opted to form a new government with former prime minister Janez Janša with Pivec continuing on in her current ministerial position. The decision came as a surprise to some as during the latter years under Erjavec the party had been taking an increasingly oppositional stance towards Janša and SDS, despite having taken part in Janša's 1st (2004–2008) and 2nd (2012–2013) governments, having gone as far as to explicitly campaign on an anti-Janša platform during the 2018 parliamentary election, particularly notable by party's close campaign cooperation with Ljubljana's mayor Zoran Janković, well known for his public opposition to Janša.

=== 14th Government of Slovenia ===
After the party's entry into Janša's 3rd government the divisions within the party became increasingly public, culminating in all five of the party's MPs as well as Health minister Tomaž Gantar calling for the resignation of Aleksandra Pivec in August 2020. During the summer, Pivec had become embroiled in a series of allegations of corruption and inappropriate behavior after making visits to a winery and the coastal town of Izola, the costs of which were covered by the private company Vina Kras and the Izola municipal government. This culminated in a public media spat between Pivec and the DeSUS parliamentary group with Pivec alleging she was being undermined by underground elements of the party and its former leader Karl Erjavec. The situation further escalated as various regional party branches voted to either support Pivec or call for her dismissal. As the national party council under the direction of Tomaž Gantar prepared to convene and vote on a motion of no confidence against Pivec and a motion to dismiss her from her position, she announced that such a dismissal would be illegitimate (as she believed only the national party congress could remove the party leader) and that she was prepared to fight it. A motion of no confidence was passed by the DeSUS national council on 22 August 2020. The vote for her dismissal was scheduled on 9 September, but Pivec resigned just before it took place and Gantar took over as acting leader (despite the party's statute putting the three deputy leaders of the party ahead of him in the line of succession). On 5 October, she also resigned as agriculture minister and deputy prime minister as the National Assembly was set to remove her from these functions. She has since left DeSUS but vowed to remain in politics.

At the December 2020 party congress, Karl Erjavec once again became party president. The party's MPs were opposed his idea of leaving the governmental coalition, whereas the party leadership supported it (The disagreements between the leadership and the parliamentary group continued until the conclusion of the contemporary National Assembly term in 2022, preceded by further division among MPs themselves). Erjavec left the party on 10 March 2020 and was replaced by Anton Balažek as the party president. He was later replaced by Brigita Čokl as acting president. Ljubo Jasnič was then elected in party elections on 19 June 2021 with 54 delegate votes out of 117. Despite his opposition to prime minister Janša, DeSUS de facto remained part of his coalition government. Jasnič eventually lead the party at the 2022 parliamentary election, where for the first time in its history, it secured no seats.

== Election results ==
=== National Assembly ===
Election	Votes	%	Seats	+/–	Government
1996	46,152	4.32 (#6)	5 / 90	▲5	Coalition 1997–00
1996	46,152	4.32 (#6)	5 / 90	▲5	Opposition 2000
2000	55,634	5.17 (#6)	4 / 90	▼1	Coalition
2004	39,150	4.04 (#7)	4 / 90	Steady	Coalition
2008	78,353	7.45 (#4)	7 / 90	▲3	Coalition
2011	76,853	6.97 (#5)	6 / 90	▼1	Coalition
2014	88,968	10.18 (#3)	10 / 90	▲4	Coalition
2018	43,889	4.93 (#8)	5 / 90	▼5	Coalition 2018–20
2018	43,889	4.93 (#8)	5 / 90	▼5	Support 2020–22 (Note: Only support by the faction, the leadership was in opposition.)
2022	7,840	0.66 (#17)	0 / 90	▼5	Extra-parliamentary

=== European Parliament ===
Election	List leader	Votes	%	Seats	+/–	EP Group
2004 (Note: Run in a joint list with Liberal Democracy.)	Jelko Kacin	95,489	21.91 (#2)	0 / 7	New	–
2009	Karl Erjavec	33,292	7.18 (#6)	0 / 8	0	–
2014	Ivo Vajgl	32,662	8.12 (#4)	1 / 8	▲1	ALDE
2019	Igor Šoltes	27,329	5.67 (#6)	0 / 8	▼1	–
2024 (Note: Run in a joint list with DD.)	Uroš Lipušček	14,980	2.22 (#9)	0 / 9	0	–
