= Same-sex marriage in Slovenia =

Same-sex marriage has been legal in Slovenia since 9 July 2022, following a ruling by the Constitutional Court of Slovenia. The court had ruled the previous month that the ban on same-sex marriages violated the Constitution of Slovenia and gave the Parliament six months to amend the law to align with the ruling, although the decision took effect immediately after publication. The National Assembly passed legislation to align with the court ruling on 4 October 2022, though it was vetoed by the National Council one week later. This veto was overridden by the National Assembly on 18 October, signed by President Borut Pahor, and went into effect on 31 January 2023. Polling suggests that a majority of Slovenes support the legal recognition of same-sex marriage. Slovenia was the first country of former Yugoslavia, the eighteenth in Europe and the 31st in the world to allow same-sex couples to marry. Previously, a bill to legalize same-sex marriage had been approved by Parliament on 3 March 2015; however, it was rejected in a referendum that December.

In 2006, Slovenia created a limited form of registered partnerships for same-sex couples, which gave partners access to property and some inheritance rights. In 2017, it began recognizing same-sex partnerships providing all of the legal rights of marriage with the exception of joint adoption and in vitro fertilisation. Since the introduction of same-sex marriage in 2022, partnerships are no longer available in Slovenia.

== Partnerships ==
=== Registration of Same-Sex Partnerships Act 2005 ===
A comprehensive registered partnership bill passed its first reading in Parliament in July 2004, but was rejected at second reading in March 2005. The bill would have provided for all of the rights of marriage except for joint adoption. A law establishing partnerships, titled the Registration of Same-Sex Partnerships Act 2005 (ZRIPS; Slovene: Zakon o registraciji istospolne partnerske skupnosti), was proposed by the government of Janez Janša on 31 March 2005. The law covered only property rights, the obligation to support a socially weaker partner and some inheritance rights. It did not grant any rights in the areas of social security, health insurance and pension, and it did not confer the status of a next-of-kin to the partner. The adoption of this law sparked considerable political debate in the National Assembly, with deputies from the Slovenian National Party opposing the recognition of same-sex unions. The opposition Social Democrats and Liberals argued that the proposed law was too weak and refused to take part in the voting. The bill was passed with 44 votes for and 3 against on 22 June 2005. It was published in the government gazette on 8 July, and became effective on 23 July 2006.

The Registration of Same-Sex Partnerships Act 2005 was repealed upon passage of the Partnership Act 2016, and ceased to be operational on 24 August 2017. The ability to enter into a partnership was ended, and all partnerships were converted into the new civil partnerships established by the 2016 legislation.

=== Family Code 2011 reforms and referendum ===
Laws regarding same-sex partnerships in Europe¹ Marriage Civil union Limited domestic recognition (cohabitation) Unrecognized Constitution limits marriage to opposite-sex couples ¹ May include recent laws or court decisions that have not yet entered into effect.

On 2 July 2009, the Constitutional Court found that it was unconstitutional to prevent registered partners from inheriting each other's property. It held that treating registered partners differently from married partners constituted discrimination on the basis of sexual orientation, breaching Article 14 of the Constitution of Slovenia. It gave Parliament six months to remedy the situation. In response, the Minister of the Interior, Katarina Kresal, announced that the government of Borut Pahor would prepare a new law to legalise same-sex marriage. The announcement stirred some level of public controversy, mainly because it provided grounds for same-sex adoption.

On 21 September 2009, the government presented a draft family code which would have allowed same-sex couples to marry and adopt children. The bill went through a period of public consultation until 1 November 2009. In December 2009, the government considered amendments to the bill, and gave final approval to the measure on 17 December 2009. It was submitted to the National Assembly on 21 December 2009. On 2 March 2010, the bill was approved by the Assembly in its first reading. On 24 January 2011, due to the difficulty of passing the bill, the government announced its intention to amend it before final passage in the National Assembly. The amended bill would have granted same-sex registered partnerships all the rights of marriage except for joint adoption—though stepchild adoption would have been permitted—and retained the definition of marriage as a "union between a man and a woman".

On 3 March 2010, the Supreme Court of Slovenia ruled that a male couple with dual Slovenian-American citizenship, who adopted a baby girl in the United States, were to be recognised as the child's legal parents in Slovenia as well. On 17 July 2011, the Ministry for Work, Family and Social Affairs allowed a woman to adopt her same-sex partner's biological child. This raised the possibility that such an adoption would be possible even if the 2011 Family Code were to be repealed in a referendum.

On 7 April 2011, the National Assembly approved the amended bill in its second reading. It passed its final reading on 16 June 2011. The new law was challenged on 1 September 2011 by a conservative popular movement called "The Civil Initiative for the Family and Rights of Children", which called for a national referendum on the issue, and started gathering the requisite signatures. In response, the government asked the Constitutional Court to declare whether such a referendum would be constitutional. On 26 December 2011, the Constitutional Court ruled that holding a referendum on this issue was constitutional. A referendum on 25 March 2012 led to the rejection of the bill.

=== Partnership Bill 2014 ===
On 14 April 2014, the Ministry of Labour, Family, Social Affairs and Equal Opportunities, Anja Kopač Mrak, presented a bill to grant partnerships all the rights of marriage, except for adoption and artificial insemination. It underwent a public consultation process until 5 May 2014. However, the bill's fate was uncertain due to early parliamentary elections on 13 July 2014, which were held following the resignation of Prime Minister Alenka Bratušek. On 15 October 2014, the Ministry announced another public consultation on the draft, which lasted until 15 November. In January 2015, Minister Anja Kopač Mrak said that the bill would be put on hold while a proposal to legalise same-sex marriage was to be considered by Parliament.

=== Partnership Act 2016 ===
On 22 December 2015, following a referendum two days earlier that prevented same-sex marriage from being legalized in Slovenia, Deputy Jani Möderndorfer introduced a bill to grant same-sex couples all the rights of marriage, except for joint adoption and in vitro fertilisation. The bill would also repeal the Registration of Same-Sex Partnerships Act 2005, and all partnerships would have to be converted to a new institution, called partnerska zveza (pronounced [ˈpàːɾtnɛɾska ˈzʋéːza]) (Note: Italian: unione civile, pronounced [uˈnjoːne tʃiˈviːle]; Hungarian: bejegyzett élettársi kapcsolat, pronounced [ˈbɛ.jɛɟzɛtː ˈeːlɛtːaːrʃi ˈkɒptʃolɒt]) in Slovene, within the first six months after the bill's date of application. Partnerska zveza had the same formal registration procedure as marriages. On 10 March 2016, the government of Miro Cerar expressed its support for the bill. On 5 April, the bill was approved by the Committee on Labour, Family, Social Policy and Disability of the National Assembly. On 21 April, it was approved by the Assembly in a 54–15 vote. The National Council did not require the Assembly to vote on the bill again.

21 April 2016 vote in the National Assembly
| Party | Voted for | Voted against | Abstained | Absent (Did not vote) |
|---|---|---|---|---|
| G Modern Centre Party | 33: Urška Ban; Tilen Božič; Milan Brglez; Tanja Cink; Erika Dekleva; Marko Ferluga; Mitja Horvat; Aleksander Kavčič; Anita Koleša; Irena Kotnik; Lilijana Kozlovič; Bojan Krajnc; Ksenija Korenjak Kramar; Simona Kustec; Dragan Matić; Jani Möderndorfer; Jasna Murgel; Andreja Potočnik; Ivan Prelog; Dušan Radič; Branislav Rajić; Danilo Anton Ranc; Vojka Šergan; Kamal Izidor Shaker; Ivan Škodnik; Maruša Škopac; Janja Sluga; Saša Tabaković; Dušan Verbič; Vesna Vervega; Simon Zajc; Igor Zorčič; Branko Zorman | – | – | 2: Marjan Dolinšek; Irena Grošelj Košnik |
| Slovenian Democratic Party | 1: Jože Tanko | 13: Anja Bah Žibert; Franc Breznik; Andrej Čuš; Jelka Godec; Vinko Gorenak; Branko Grims; Eva Irgl; Janez Janša; Danijel Krivec; Tomaž Lisec; Bojan Podkrajšek; Marko Pogačnik; Ljubo Žnidar | – | 7: Nada Brinovšek; Zvonko Lah; Anže Logar; Žan Mahnič; Marijan Pojbič; Suzana Lep Šimenko; Andrej Šircelj |
| G Democratic Party of Pensioners | 10: Tomaž Gantar; Primož Hainz; Ivan Hršak; Jana Jenko; Franc Jurša; Benedikt Kopmajer; Marija Antonija Kovačič; Marinka Levičar; Uroš Prikl; Peter Vilfan | – | – | 1: Marjana Kotnik Poropat |
| G Social Democrats | 4: Marija Bačič; Matjaž Han; Bojana Muršič; Janko Veber | – | – | 2: Matjaž Nemec; Jan Škoberne |
| United Left | 3: Luka Mesec; Violeta Tomić; Matej Tašner Vatovec | – | – | 3: Matjaž Hanžek; Miha Kordiš; Franc Trček |
| New Slovenia | – | 2: Jožef Horvat; Ljudmila Novak | – | 3: Iva Dimic; Matej Tonin; Jernej Vrtovec |
| Independent | 1: Bojan Dobovšek | – | – | 3: Mirjam Bon Klanjšček; Alenka Bratušek; Franc Laj |
| Unaffiliated MPs (Note: Hungarian and Italian minorities) | 2: Roberto Battelli; László Göncz | – | – | – |
| Total | 54 | 15 | 0 | 21 |
| Total | 60.0% | 23.3% | 0.0% | 16.7% |

On 28 April, the Trade Union of Migrant Workers (SDMS; Sindikat delavcev migrantov Slovenije) filed a motion, with 2,500 signatures, in order to be allowed to proceed with a petition for a referendum. However, on 5 May, the Speaker of the National Assembly, Milan Brglez, refused to set a thirty-five-day deadline during which the proposers could collect 40,000 valid signatures to force a referendum, arguing that this and several other SDMS referendum initiatives constituted an abuse of the referendum laws. He sent the bill for promulgation the next day. It was promulgated by President Borut Pahor and published in the official gazette on 9 May 2016. The law took effect on the fifteenth day after publication (i.e. 24 May 2016) and became operational nine months later (i.e. 24 February 2017). On 10 May, the SDMS challenged Brglez's decision to the Constitutional Court, which rejected the challenge on 21 July 2016.

The ability to enter into a partnership was closed off following the legalization of same-sex marriage in Slovenia. Partners could convert their union into a recognized marriage until 31 July 2023. Couples were afforded an extra two months to convert their partnerships into marriages if they were unable to do so previously for "excusable reasons". Otherwise, all partnerships were dissolved on 31 July.

=== Statistics ===
According to Slovenia's official statistics agency, SiStat, 284 same-sex partnerships had been performed in Slovenia under both the 2005 and 2016 laws up to the end of 2018. A majority of partnerships were between men, and most were performed in 2017 and 2018.

== Same-sex marriage ==
=== Attempt at legalisation in 2015 ===
On 15 December 2014, the opposition United Left (ZL) introduced a bill to the Slovenian Parliament to legalise same-sex marriage. The sponsors of the bill said its goal was to "provide equal rights to all members of society". The Cerar Government expressed no opposition to the bill. Two of the three parties in the governing coalition, the Modern Centre Party (SMC) and the Social Democrats (SD), backed the bill, as did the opposition ZL and the Alliance of Alenka Bratušek (ZaAB). The third party in the coalition, the Democratic Party of Pensioners of Slovenia (DeSUS), decided to allow a conscience vote within its ranks. Only the Slovenian Democratic Party (SDS) and New Slovenia (NSi) opposed it. On 10 February 2015, the Committee on Labour, Family, Social Policy and Disability of the National Assembly passed the bill by 11 votes to 2. The Assembly passed the bill in its third reading in a 51–28 vote on 3 March. On 10 March 2015, the National Council rejected a motion to require the Assembly to vote on the bill again in a 14–23 vote. The bill was sent to President Borut Pahor for his signature or veto.

3 March 2015 vote in the National Assembly
| Party | Voted for | Voted against | Abstained | Absent (Did not vote) |
|---|---|---|---|---|
| G Modern Centre Party | 33: Urška Ban; Tilen Božič; Milan Brglez; Erika Dekleva; Bojan Dobovšek; Marjan Dolinšek; Marko Ferluga; Mitja Horvat; Aleksander Kavčič; Anita Koleša; Irena Grošelj Košnik; Irena Kotnik; Lilijana Kozlovič; Bojan Krajnc; Ksenija Korenjak Kramar; Simona Kustec; Franc Laj; Dragan Matić; Jasna Murgel; Andreja Potočnik; Ivan Prelog; Branislav Rajić; Danilo Anton Ranc; Vojka Šergan; Kamal Izidor Shaker; Maruša Škopac; Janja Sluga; Dušan Verbič; Vesna Vervega; Simon Zajc; Margareta Guček Zakošek; Igor Zorčič; Branko Zorman | – | 1: Ivan Škodnik | 2: Tanja Cink; Klavdija Markež |
| Slovenian Democratic Party | – | 19: Anja Bah Žibert; Franc Breznik; Nada Brinovšek; Andrej Čuš; Jelka Godec; Vinko Gorenak; Eva Irgl; Janez Janša; Danijel Krivec; Zvonko Lah; Tomaž Lisec; Anže Logar; Žan Mahnič; Bojan Podkrajšek; Marijan Pojbič; Suzana Lep Šimenko; Andrej Šircelj; Jože Tanko; Ljubo Žnidar | – | 2: Branko Grims; Marko Pogačnik |
| G Democratic Party of Pensioners | 3: Tomaž Gantar; Primož Hainz; Jana Jenko | 4: Ivan Hršak; Franc Jurša; Marija Antonija Kovačič; Marinka Levičar | 2: Benedikt Kopmajer; Uroš Prikl | 1: Marjana Kotnik Poropat |
| G Social Democrats | 6: Marija Bačič; Matjaž Han; Andreja Katič; Franc Križanič; Bojana Muršič; Matjaž Nemec | – | – | – |
| United Left | 6: Matjaž Hanžek; Miha Kordiš; Luka Mesec; Violeta Tomić; Franc Trček; Matej Tašner Vatovec | – | – | – |
| New Slovenia | – | 5: Iva Dimic; Jožef Horvat; Ljudmila Novak; Matej Tonin; Jernej Vrtovec | – | – |
| Alliance of Alenka Bratušek | 3: Mirjam Bon Klanjšček; Jani Möderndorfer; Peter Vilfan | – | – | 1: Alenka Bratušek |
| Unaffiliated MPs | – | – | 2: Roberto Battelli; László Göncz | – |
| Total | 51 | 28 | 5 | 6 |
| Total | 56.7% | 31.1% | 5.6% | 6.7% |

On 10 March 2015, opponents of the bill announced that they had collected more than 80,000 signatures to call for a referendum. They filed 2,500 of them, as required, in order to be allowed to proceed with the petition for a popular vote. On 17 March, the leader of the SMC parliamentary group said that, although the party supported same-sex marriage legislation, it would not try to prevent a possible referendum on the issue. ZL, the main proponent of the bill, criticized the statement. However, on 19 March, SMC politicians clarified that they were against blocking proponents from collecting signatures, but that the party would support the motion to block the referendum when the signatures are submitted. On 23 March 2015, a thirty-five-day term began in which the supporters of an eventual referendum had to collect 40,000 valid signatures. On the same day, a group of 23 deputies from SD, DeSUS, ZL and ZaAB filed a request calling for a special session of the Assembly in order to vote on a motion to block the referendum. On 26 March, the National Assembly voted 53–21 to block the referendum on the grounds that it would violate the constitutional provision prohibiting popular votes on laws eliminating human rights and fundamental freedoms.

26 March 2015 vote in the National Assembly
| Party | Voted for | Voted against | Abstained | Absent (Did not vote) |
|---|---|---|---|---|
| G Modern Centre Party | 34: Urška Ban; Tilen Božič; Milan Brglez; Erika Dekleva; Bojan Dobovšek; Marjan Dolinšek; Marko Ferluga; Mitja Horvat; Aleksander Kavčič; Anita Koleša; Irena Grošelj Košnik; Irena Kotnik; Lilijana Kozlovič; Bojan Krajnc; Ksenija Korenjak Kramar; Simona Kustec; Franc Laj; Klavdija Markež; Dragan Matić; Jasna Murgel; Andreja Potočnik; Ivan Prelog; Branislav Rajic; Danilo Anton Ranc; Vojka Šergan; Kamal Izidor Shaker; Ivan Škodnik; Maruša Škopac; Dušan Verbič; Vesna Vervega; Simon Zajc; Margareta Guček Zakošek; Igor Zorčič; Branko Zorman | – | – | 2: Tanja Cink; Janja Sluga |
| Slovenian Democratic Party | – | 17: Anja Bah Žibert; Nada Brinovšek; Andrej Čuš; Jelka Godec; Vinko Gorenak; Branko Grims; Danijel Krivec; Zvonko Lah; Tomaž Lisec; Anže Logar; Bojan Podkrajšek; Marko Pogačnik; Marijan Pojbič; Suzana Lep Šimenko; Andrej Šircelj; Jože Tanko; Ljubo Žnidar | – | 4: Franc Breznik; Eva Irgl; Janez Janša; Žan Mahnič |
| G Democratic Party of Pensioners | 5: Tomaž Gantar; Primož Hainz; Jana Jenko; Marjana Kotnik Poropat; Uroš Prikl | – | 2: Franc Jurša; Benedikt Kopmajer | 3: Ivan Hršak; Marija Antonija Kovačič; Marinka Levičar |
| G Social Democrats | 6: Marija Bačič; Matjaž Han; Andreja Katič; Franc Križanič; Bojana Muršič; Matjaž Nemec | – | – | – |
| United Left | 6: Matjaž Hanžek; Miha Kordiš; Luka Mesec; Violeta Tomić; Franc Trček; Matej Tašner Vatovec | – | – | – |
| New Slovenia | – | 4: Iva Dimic; Jožef Horvat; Matej Tonin; Jernej Vrtovec | – | 1: Ljudmila Novak |
| Alliance of Alenka Bratušek | 2: Mirjam Bon Klanjšček; Peter Vilfan | – | – | 2: Alenka Bratušek; Jani Möderndorfer |
| Unaffiliated MPs | – | – | 1: László Göncz | 1: Roberto Battelli |
| Total | 53 | 21 | 3 | 13 |
| Total | 58.9% | 23.3% | 3.3% | 14.4% |

The proponents of the referendum, who announced that they had collected 48,146 signatures before the Assembly's vote, said they would appeal the decision to the Constitutional Court, which they did on 2 April. The court had the option of declaring the referendum unconstitutional, as Article 90 of the Constitution prohibits referendums on the subject of constitutionally protected human rights. Any referendum in Slovenia is only successful if a majority of participants and at least 20% of all eligible voters vote in favor of the law. The Constitutional Court deliberated about the appeal in four sessions on 10 June, 9 July, 10 September and 24 September. In October 2015, the Roman Catholic Archbishop of Ljubljana, Stanislav Zore, signaled his support for the referendum.

On 22 October 2015, the court officially published its decision, permitting the referendum to proceed. However, the ruling did not address Article 90, making a new challenge to the referendum possible. The ruling solely regarded the ability of the National Assembly to declare a referendum unconstitutional. On 4 November 2015, the National Assembly decided that the referendum would take place on 20 December 2015. The bill was rejected, as a majority of voters voted against and the votes against were more than 20% of registered voters, as required by the Constitution.

=== 2022 Constitutional Court ruling and passage of legislation ===
On 16 June 2022, the Constitutional Court ruled 6–3 that an exclusively heterosexual definition of marriage was inconsistent with the Constitution of Slovenia's requirement for equal treatment. Discrimination against same-sex couples "cannot be justified with the traditional meaning of marriage as a union between a man and a woman", the court ruled. It found that article 3 of the Family Code, which defined marriage as the union of "a husband and a wife", was incompatible with the Constitution. The court ordered the Slovenian Parliament to bring legislation in line within six months, although the ruling would take effect immediately after publication. The court wrote that the decision "does not diminish the importance of traditional marriage as a union of a man and a woman, nor does it change conditions under which persons of the opposite sex marry. All it means is that same-sex partners can now marry just like heterosexual partners can." The court also ruled that the ban on joint adoption by same-sex couples was inconsistent with the constitutional requirement for equal treatment. Slovenia was the first country of former Yugoslavia, the first post-communist state (excluding East Germany), and the 18th in Europe to legalize same-sex marriage. The court's decisions were published on 8 July and became effective the following day.

Parties of the coalition government welcomed the decision in announcements on social media. The Minister of Labour, Family, Social Affairs and Equal Opportunity, Luka Mesec, welcomed the court decision and said he would prepare draft legislation to conform with the ruling: "The Constitutional Court has ordered us to do it, and we will do it with the greatest pleasure." Prime Minister Robert Golob also welcomed the court ruling. The government published legislation to amend the Family Code in accordance with the court's ruling on 15 July, and stated that the amendments to the code would be fast-tracked through the Parliament. The National Assembly passed the bill on 4 October 2022 in a 48–29 vote. The LGBT rights group Legebitra released the following statement, "After more than 30 years of demands for legal recognition of same-sex partnerships, we are finally closer to actual equality. We are happy that the MPs supported the changes to the Family Code with a majority of votes and finally equalized the rights of same-sex couples in marriage and equal treatment in adoptions." Radiotelevizija Slovenija reported in early August 2022 that the first two same-sex marriages had been performed in Slovenia.

4 October 2022 vote in the National Assembly
| Party | Voted for | Voted against | Abstained | Absent (Did not vote) |
|---|---|---|---|---|
| G Freedom Movement | 36: Nataša Avšič Bogovič; Mirjam Bon Klanjšček; Mateja Čalušić; Bojan Čebela; Jožica Derganc; Miroslav Gregorič; Lena Grgurevič; Alma Intihar; Robert Janev; Andreja Kert; Urška Klakočar Zupančič; Tamara Kozlovič; Darko Krajnc; Tomaž Lah; Martin Marzidovšek; Tereza Novak; Tine Novak; Gašper Ovnik; Monika Pekošak; Dean Premik; Martin Premk; Franc Props; Aleksander Prosen Kralj; Andreja Rajbenšu; Borut Sajovic; Mojca Šetinc Pašek; Janja Sluga; Dušan Stojanovič; Katarina Štravs; Lucija Tacer Perlin; Teodor Uranič; Tamara Vonta; Lenart Žavbi; Dejan Zavec; Sara Žibrat; Andreja Živic | – | – | 5: Sandra Gazinkovski; Vera Granfol; Miha Lamut; Aleš Rezar; Rastislav Vrečko |
| Slovenian Democratic Party | – | 21: Zvonko Černač; Rado Gladek; Jelka Godec; Branko Grims; Alenka Helbl; Janez Janša; Jožef Jelen; Alenka Jeraj; Dejan Kaloh; Franci Kepa; Danijel Krivec; Jožef Lenart; Suzana Lep Šimenko; Tomaž Lisec; Janez Magyar; Žan Mahnič; Zoran Mojškerc; Bojan Podkrajšek; Franc Rosec; Anton Šturbej; Jože Tanko | 1: Anže Logar | 5: Anja Bah Žibert; Franc Breznik; Karmen Furman; Andrej Hoivik; Eva Irgl |
| New Slovenia | – | 8: Vida Čadonič Špelič; Janez Cigler Kralj; Iva Dimic; Jožef Horvat; Aleksander Reberšek; Matej Tonin; Jernej Vrtovec; Janez Žakelj | – | – |
| G Social Democrats | 6: Predrag Baković; Soniboj Knežak; Bojana Muršič; Jani Prednik; Jonas Žnidaršič; Damijan Zrim | – | – | 1: Meira Hot |
| G The Left | 5: Tatjana Greif; Milan Jakopovič; Miha Kordiš; Nataša Sukič; Matej Vatovec | – | – | – |
| Unaffiliated MPs | 1: Felice Žiža | – | – | 1: Ferenc Horváth |
| Total | 48 | 29 | 1 | 12 |
| Total | 53.3% | 32.2% | 1.1% | 13.3% |

On 11 October 2022, the bill was given a suspensory veto by the National Council by a vote of 17 to 11, requiring another vote in the National Assembly. That same day, representatives of the Coalition for Children submitted some 30,600 signatures to the National Assembly to start the process of a conducting a referendum on the vetoed legislation; however, referendums that deal with human rights are not permitted by law. It was announced on 14 October that there would be an extraordinary legislative session in the Assembly the following Tuesday, 18 October, to re-vote on the vetoed legislation. The Assembly passed the bill by a final vote of 51–24.

18 October 2022 vote in the National Assembly
| Party | Voted for | Voted against | Abstained | Absent (Did not vote) |
|---|---|---|---|---|
| G Freedom Movement | 39: Nataša Avšič Bogovič; Mirjam Bon Klanjšček; Mateja Čalušić; Bojan Čebela; Jožica Derganc; Vera Granfol; Miroslav Gregorič; Lena Grgurevič; Alma Intihar; Robert Janev; Andreja Kert; Urška Klakočar Zupančič; Tamara Kozlovič; Darko Krajnc; Tomaž Lah; Miha Lamut; Martin Marzidovšek; Tereza Novak; Tine Novak; Gašper Ovnik; Monika Pekošak; Dean Premik; Martin Premk; Franc Props; Aleksander Prosen Kralj; Andreja Rajbenšu; Aleš Rezar; Borut Sajovic; Mojca Šetinc Pašek; Janja Sluga; Dušan Stojanovič; Katarina Štravs; Lucija Tacer Perlin; Teodor Uranič; Tamara Vonta; Lenart Žavbi; Dejan Zavec; Sara Žibrat; Andreja Živic | – | – | 2: Sandra Gazinkovski; Rastislav Vrečko |
| Slovenian Democratic Party | – | 18: Franc Breznik; Zvonko Černač; Rado Gladek; Jelka Godec; Branko Grims; Andrej Hoivik; Janez Janša; Jožef Jelen; Alenka Jeraj; Dejan Kaloh; Franci Kepa; Danijel Krivec; Jožef Lenart; Tomaž Lisec; Janez Magyar; Franc Rosec; Anton Šturbej; Jože Tanko | – | 9: Anja Bah Žibert; Karmen Furman; Alenka Helbl; Eva Irgl; Suzana Lep Šimenko; Anže Logar; Žan Mahnič; Zoran Mojškerc; Bojan Podkrajšek |
| New Slovenia | – | 6: Janez Cigler Kralj; Iva Dimic; Jožef Horvat; Aleksander Reberšek; Matej Tonin; Janez Žakelj | – | 2: Vida Čadonič Špelič; Jernej Vrtovec |
| G Social Democrats | 7: Predrag Baković; Meira Hot; Soniboj Knežak; Bojana Muršič; Jani Prednik; Jonas Žnidaršič; Damijan Zrim | – | – | – |
| G The Left | 5: Tatjana Greif; Milan Jakopovič; Miha Kordiš; Nataša Sukič; Matej Vatovec | – | – | – |
| Unaffiliated MPs | – | – | – | 2: Ferenc Horváth; Felice Žiža |
| Total | 51 | 24 | 0 | 15 |
| Total | 56.7% | 26.7% | 0.0% | 16.7% |

On 28 October 2022, the National Assembly approved a resolution by 45 votes to 27 with 2 abstentions, deeming a proposed referendum on changes to the Family Code inadmissible.

28 October 2022 vote in the National Assembly
| Party | Voted for | Voted against | Abstained | Absent (Did not vote) |
|---|---|---|---|---|
| G Freedom Movement | 36: Mirjam Bon Klanjšček; Mateja Čalušić; Bojan Čebela; Jožica Derganc; Sandra Gazinkovski; Vera Granfol; Miroslav Gregorič; Lena Grgurevič; Alma Intihar; Robert Janev; Andreja Kert; Urška Klakočar Zupančič; Tamara Kozlovič; Darko Krajnc; Tomaž Lah; Miha Lamut; Martin Marzidovšek; Tereza Novak; Gašper Ovnik; Monika Pekošak; Dean Premik; Martin Premk; Franc Props; Aleksander Prosen Kralj; Andreja Rajbenšu; Borut Sajovic; Mojca Šetinc Pašek; Dušan Stojanovič; Katarina Štravs; Lucija Tacer Perlin; Teodor Uranič; Rastislav Vrečko; Lenart Žavbi; Dejan Zavec; Sara Žibrat; Andreja Živic | – | – | 5: Nataša Avšič Bogovič; Tine Novak; Aleš Rezar; Janja Sluga; Tamara Vonta |
| Slovenian Democratic Party | – | 22: Franc Breznik; Zvonko Černač; Karmen Furman; Rado Gladek; Jelka Godec; Branko Grims; Alenka Helbl; Andrej Hoivik; Janez Janša; Jožef Jelen; Alenka Jeraj; Franci Kepa; Danijel Krivec; Jožef Lenart; Suzana Lep Šimenko; Tomaž Lisec; Janez Magyar; Žan Mahnič; Zoran Mojškerc; Bojan Podkrajšek; Anton Šturbej; Jože Tanko | – | 5: Anja Bah Žibert; Eva Irgl; Dejan Kaloh; Anže Logar; Franc Rosec |
| New Slovenia | – | 5: Vida Čadonič Špelič; Janez Cigler Kralj; Jožef Horvat; Aleksander Reberšek; Janez Žakelj | – | 3: Iva Dimic; Matej Tonin; Jernej Vrtovec |
| G Social Democrats | 5: Predrag Baković; Meira Hot; Soniboj Knežak; Bojana Muršič; Jani Prednik | – | – | 2: Jonas Žnidaršič; Damijan Zrim |
| G The Left | 4: Tatjana Greif; Milan Jakopovič; Nataša Sukič; Matej Vatovec | – | – | 1: Miha Kordiš |
| Unaffiliated MPs | – | – | 2: Ferenc Horváth; Felice Žiža | – |
| Total | 45 | 27 | 2 | 16 |
| Total | 50.0% | 30.0% | 2.2% | 17.8% |

The bill was signed into law by President Borut Pahor, and published in the Official Gazette of the Republic of Slovenia on 28 October. Opponents of the legislation were informed that they had 15 days from the publication date to contest the decision to the Constitutional Court (i.e. until 12 November), which they did within that time period. On 11 January 2023, the Constitutional Court upheld the decision of the National Assembly to declare the referendum inadmissible. The law was published once more in the Official Gazette on 16 January 2023, and took effect 15 days later (i.e. 31 January 2023).

Article 3 of the Family Code now reads:

Zakonska zveza je življenjska skupnost dveh oseb, katere sklenitev, pravne posledice in prenehanje ureja ta zakonik.

(Marriage is a life union of two persons, whose conclusion, legal consequences and termination are governed by this Code.)

=== Statistics ===
According to the Ministry of the Interior, 345 same-sex partnerships had been converted to marriages by 31 July 2023.

=== Religious performance ===
The Catholic Church opposes same-sex marriage and does not allow its priests to officiate at such marriages. However, in December 2023, the Holy See published Fiducia supplicans, a declaration allowing Catholic priests to bless couples who are not considered to be married according to church teaching, including the blessing of same-sex couples.

The Evangelical Church of the Augsburg Confession in Slovenia does not offer blessings to same-sex unions, although Pastor Jana Kerčmar Džuban said in 2015 that if a same-sex couple "who wanted to affirm their love before God [came to her], [her] conscience would not allow [her] to deny them the blessing of marriage".

== Public opinion ==
A Eurobarometer survey published in December 2006 showed that 31% of Slovenes surveyed supported same-sex marriage and 17% supported same-sex adoption. Both were lower than the EU average of 44% and 33%, respectively. A survey conducted in October 2009 showed that 23% of respondents supported adoption rights for same-sex couples, while 74% were opposed. A poll conducted by Delo in February 2015 showed that 59% of Slovenians supported same-sex marriage, while 37% were against. A separate question in the same survey found that 51% of Slovenians supported the same-sex marriage bill which was being debated in the National Assembly at the time, while 42% were against. The poll also showed that 38% of respondents supported adoption by same-sex couples and 55% were opposed. Another poll conducted by Ninamedia in March 2015 showed that 42% of respondents supported the new law, while 54% were opposed. Support was highest among those younger than 30, and in the Slovene Littoral.

A poll conducted by Delo in March 2015 showed that a majority of respondents thought that the Constitutional Court should not allow a referendum on the issue of same-sex marriage. Of those who said they would participate in a possible referendum, 36% said they would support the law, and 50% said they would vote against it.

The 2015 Eurobarometer found that 54% of Slovenians thought that same-sex marriage should be allowed throughout Europe, while 40% were against. In 2019, the Eurobarometer found that support had increased to 62%, while 35% were opposed. The 2023 Eurobarometer showed that support was unchanged, at 62%, while 37% were opposed. The survey also showed that 58% of Slovenians agreed that "there is nothing wrong in a sexual relationship between two persons of the same sex", while 40% disagreed.

== See also ==
- LGBT rights in Slovenia
- Recognition of same-sex unions in Europe
