= 2021 Slovenian Waters Act referendum =

- 11 July 2021
- Do you support the implementation of the Water Law Amendment Act (ZV-1G) adopted by the National Assembly at its session on March 30, 2021?

Results
Choice	Votes	%
Yes	104,312	13.25%
No	682,760	86.75%
Valid votes	787,072	99.76%
Invalid or blank votes	1,896	0.24%
Total votes	788,968	100.00%
Registered voters/turnout	1,698,642	46.45%

A referendum on amendments to the Waters Act was held in Slovenia on 11 July 2021. According to the environmental activists and the domain experts, the provisions of the law would have detrimental effects on the environment and on clean water. With one of the highest turnouts in recent history, the Act was overwhelmingly rejected by the voters.

== Background ==
In March 2021, the National Assembly passed the Waters Act, despite strong criticism from the experts and civil society. While Slovenia’s Ministry of the Environment and Spatial Planning claimed that the provisions of the Waters Act prohibited the construction of industrial facilities and private buildings on the banks of rivers and lakes, environmental activists instead argued that the changes to the 37th paragraph would loosen the rules and allow construction of hotels and malls in coastal areas and on river and lake banks, polluting the sources of drinking water.

Per article 90 of the Constitution, 40,000 voters can require the National Assembly to call for a referendum to reject a law that was ratified by the Assembly. The law is rejected if a majority of voters who have cast valid votes vote against the law, provided at least one fifth of all qualified voters have voted against the law. A minimum of 20% of the voters (around 343,000 voters of about 1.7 million registered voters) are required to cast a valid "no" vote for a negative result of the referendum to be valid.

Following amendments to the Water Act, environmental organisations collected 52,230 signatures calling for a referendum, exceeding the 40,000 signatures required to force a referendum on the law. The referendum was scheduled to take place on 11 July 2021.

In the referendum campaign, both sides claimed that they want to protect clean water. Andrej Vizjak, the Minister of the Environment and Spatial Planning, argued that the law prohibits construction of factories and private houses on the shore, a provision already contained in the existing law. The new law would also improve flood management and prevention. This position was supported by the government parties, Slovenian Democratic Party, New Slovenia, and Modern Centre Party. On the other hand, the environmental and civil society groups joined together in a "Movement for Drinkable Water" warned of several legal loopholes that would actually allow construction of facilities on the shores, including restaurants and hotels, and could prevent access to the shore to the general public, increase flood risks and damage the water supply. Opponents to the law included experts in water management, opposition political parties, as well as research organizations, the Faculty of Civil Engineering of University of Ljubljana, and the Slovenian Academy of Sciences and Arts. The opponents of the law claimed that the pamphlet which the government parties sent to the citizens was full of inaccuracies and was aimed at confusing people. The ombudsman warned that the law was passed too fast and without involvement of experts, which prevented the public from getting involved in drafting the law.

== Results ==
Early voting began on 6 July. Over 54 000 people (3.21%) cast early votes, with long queues being reported in front of voting stations. Civil initiatives warned of several problems in the voting process. The portal for electronic voter registration was often unavailable and several voters living abroad reported they did not receive their ballots by mail or the ballots contained errors or were even empty. The elderly living at retirement homes complained they received instructions for voting by mail only hours before the deadline. Because of that, the union of taxi drivers offered the elderly free transport to voting stations in Ljubljana, Maribor, and Koper.

The voter turnout was above 46% and the Waters Act was overwhelmingly rejected with over 86% of people voting against it. This was the second highest turnout for a referendum to repeal a law, only behind the 2007 privatisation referendum, at 58%, that was held together with the runoff of the presidential election.

In the reactions after the announcement of the results, Igor Zorčič, the Speaker of the National Assembly of Slovenia, stated that the outcome showed that the public did not support either the law or Janša's cabinet in general. Tanja Fajon, the leader of the opposition Social Democrats stated that they were seriously considering another vote of no confidence in the Assembly. In his reaction, Vizjak told public broadcaster TV Slovenia that the referendum was misused and the government's goals misinterpreted, as well as that the vote against the Waters Act was also a vote against the government, but the position of the Slovenian Democratic Party was that he did need to resign. The other two government parties did not comment on the results immediately. Nika Kovač from the Institute 8 March group that campaigned against the changes stated that "It has been shown that Slovenia is home to compassionate and tolerant people who help each other and fight for the public good and for nature". Political analyst Andraž Zorko interpreted the results as an expression of public dissatisfaction with the government and claimed that the government now lacks legitimacy. A high voter turnout was also viewed as the result of involvement of younger voters as the Waters Act addressed several environmental issues.

Choice	Votes	%
For	104,312	13.25
Against	682,760	86.75
Total	787,072	100.00
Valid votes	787,072	99.76
Invalid/blank votes	1,896	0.24
Total votes	788,968	100.00
Registered voters/turnout	1,698,642	46.45
Source: Volitve
