= 2015 Slovenian same-sex marriage referendum =

- 20 December 2015
- Are you in favor of the Law on Amendments and Additions to the Marriage and Family Status Act, which the National Assembly adopted in the session of 3 March 2015?

Results
Choice	Votes	%
Yes	226,651	36.49%
No	394,482	63.51%
Valid votes	621,133	99.62%
Invalid or blank votes	2,356	0.38%
Total votes	623,489	100.00%
Registered voters/turnout	1,714,055	36.38%
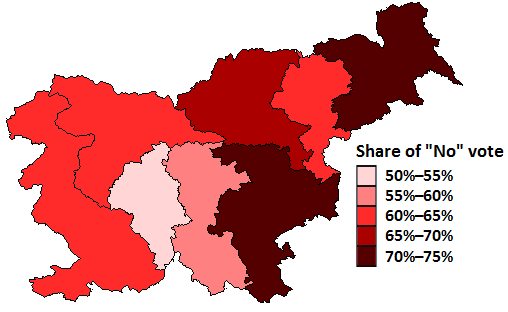
- Results by constituencies

A referendum on a bill legalising same-sex marriage was held in Slovenia on 20 December 2015. The bill was rejected, as a majority of voters voted against and the votes against were more than 20% of registered voters.

== Background ==
On 3 March 2015 the National Assembly passed a bill defining marriage as a "union of two" instead of a "union of a man and a woman." Conservative opponents of the law, including a group called Children Are At Stake, gathered enough signatures to force a referendum on the issue, hoping to block same-sex marriage. On 26 March, the National Assembly voted to block the referendum on the ground that it would violate the constitutional provision which prohibits popular votes on laws eliminating an unconstitutionality in the field of human rights and fundamental freedoms. The proponents of a referendum appealed to the Constitutional Court, which on 22 October declared that the National Assembly does not have the ability to declare a referendum unconstitutional. The National Assembly thus on 4 November scheduled a referendum to be held on 20 December 2015. Per article 90 of the Constitution a law is rejected if "a majority of voters who have cast valid votes vote against the law, provided at least one fifth of all qualified voters have voted against the law". A minimum of 343,104 voters (which makes up 20% of about 1.7 million registered voters) are required to cast a valid "no" vote for the result of the referendum to be valid.

In a 2012 referendum, 54.55% of voters rejected a law that would have expanded rights for same-sex registered partnerships.

Slovenian Catholic groups, and Pope Francis urged a "no" vote. A number of EU politicians, including Violeta Bulc called for a "yes" vote. All parties in Parliament except SDS and NSi supported a 'Yes' vote.

== Opinion polls ==
A poll conducted by Delo Stik in February 2015 showed that 51% of Slovenians supported the bill, which was debated in the National Assembly at the time, while 42% were against.

Another poll conducted by Ninamedia in March 2015 showed that 42% of respondents supported the new law, while 54% opposed. Support was highest among those younger than 30, and in the Slovene Littoral region.

A poll from November 2015 showed that 46% of respondents supported and 54% opposed the bill. The poll suggested a strong division between different groups. While most women, atheists and residents of urban areas supported the bill, a significant majority of men, Catholics and rural population opposed it. The poll also suggested a low turnout and the possibility that the result would be non-binding.

Published	Polling organisation/Client	For	Against	Undecided / none
18 Dec	Ninamedia	40%	48%	12%
16 Dec	Episcenter	48%	51%	-
16 Dec	Delo	43%	40%	17%
30 Nov	Večer	48%	46%	6%
30 Nov	Delo	42%	41%	17%
22 Nov	Episcenter	46%	54%	-
30 May	Eurobarometer	54%	40%	6%
14 Mar	Ninamedia	42%	54%	4%
16 Feb	Delo	51%	42%	7%

== Results ==
Early voting began on Tuesday 15 December 2015 and continued for the two following days. Results were released on Sunday 20 December 2015 after all polls closed. The bill was rejected by a majority of those who voted and a sufficient number of "no" votes were cast (more than 20% of all registered voters) thus fulfilling both constitutional requirements for a binding result.

Choice	Votes	%
For	226,651	36.49
Against	394,482	63.51
Total	621,133	100.00
Valid votes	621,133	99.62
Invalid/blank votes	2,356	0.38
Total votes	623,489	100.00
Registered voters/turnout	1,714,055	36.38
Source: DVK

== Aftermath ==
The parliament is obliged by the result for one year and cannot propose similar legislation in that period. Initiators of the referendum suggested that they will not oppose legislation which would expand social rights for same-sex unions as long as it does not include adoption rights and redefinition of marriage. Supporters of the defeated bill expressed their disappointment over the result and suggested that a number of 'yes' voters clearly decided to boycott the referendum. Same-sex marriage was however legalized by courts, with immediate effect, in July 2022.

== Inaccessible polling places dispute ==
Before the referendum, two voters with disabilities requested that the authorities make their polling places accessible. Their requests were denied, and the courts rejected their lawsuits and appeals. In 2019, together with the Slovenian Disability Rights Association (Drupis), they submitted applications to the European Court of Human Rights. In January 2020, the Court communicated the cases with the government of Slovenia. As of January 2020, the cases, called Toplak v. Slovenia and Mrak v. Slovenia, are ongoing.

== See also ==
- Recognition of same-sex unions in Slovenia
- LGBT rights in Slovenia
- 2012 Slovenian Family Code referendum
