= Monika Kirbiš Rojs =

Slovenian economist and politician (born 1978)

- Official portrait, 2026

Minister of Local Self-Government, Cohesion, and Regional Development
- Incumbent
- Assumed office 4 June 2026
- Prime Minister: Janez Janša
- Preceded by: Aleksander Jevšek

Personal details
- Born: 4 August 1978 (age 48)
- Party: Focus of Marko Lotrič
- Education: School of Economics and Business, Ljubljana; University of Maribor

Monika Kirbiš Rojs (born 4 August 1978) is a Slovenian economist and politician. She has been serving as Minister of Local Self-Government, Cohesion, and Regional Development of Slovenia since 2026 and previously served as secretary-general of the National Council between 2022 and 2026. She is the general secretary of the Focus of Marko Lotrič party.

== Early life and education ==
Kirbiš Rojs was born 4 August 1978 and grew up in Maribor. She studied at the University of Maribor and the School of Economics and Business, Ljubljana, obtaining a degree in 2002 and a master's degree in 2005. In 2024 she obtained the PhD in public administration from the Nova University.

== Career ==
She started her career in public administration in 2003 at the Ministry of Finance, later gaining experience at NLB Group, the Government Office for Local Self-Government and Regional Policy, and the Municipality of Maribor. Her work has focused on regional development, the management of EU funds and public-sector projects. From 2012 to 2013, Kirbiš Rojs was State Secretary for Cohesion Policy at the Ministry of Economic Development and Technology. Before returning to a state secretary position in 2020, this time at the Government Office for Development and European Cohesion Policy, she held management roles in Slovenska Bistrica, including heading the municipal economic affairs department and directing its Development Information Centre.

Kirbiš Rojs was involved in coordinating the preparation of Slovenia's Recovery and Resilience Plan and key EU funding frameworks for the 2021–2027 period. In 2022, she became Secretary-General of the National Council of Slovenia. Alongside her public service, she has contributed to professional and academic publications on regional development, public administration and European cohesion policy. In 2025 she became the general secretary of the newly founded Focus of Marko Lotrič party.

In May 2026 Kirbiš Rojs was announced as the Minister of Local Self-Government, Cohesion, and Regional Development of the Janša new cabinet. She was sworn in on 4 June 2026.
