= Ministry of Economy, Labour, and Sport of the Republic of Slovenia =

Ministry of Economy, Labour, and Sport
- Ministrstvo za gospodarstvo, delo in šport
- Coat of arms of Slovenia

Agency overview
- Formed: 1991
- Jurisdiction: Government of Slovenia
- Agency executive: Anže Logar, Minister of Economy, Labour, and Sport

Ministry of Economy, Labour, and Sport (Slovene: Ministrstvo za gospodarstvo, delo in šport; MGDŠ) is an executive department of the Government of the Republic of Slovenia, mainly responsible for economy, entrepreneurship, industry, competitiveness, space policy, the internal market, corporate and intellectual property law, state aid, protection of competition and consumper protection, trade policy, postal service, tourism, sports, labor relations and labour rights.

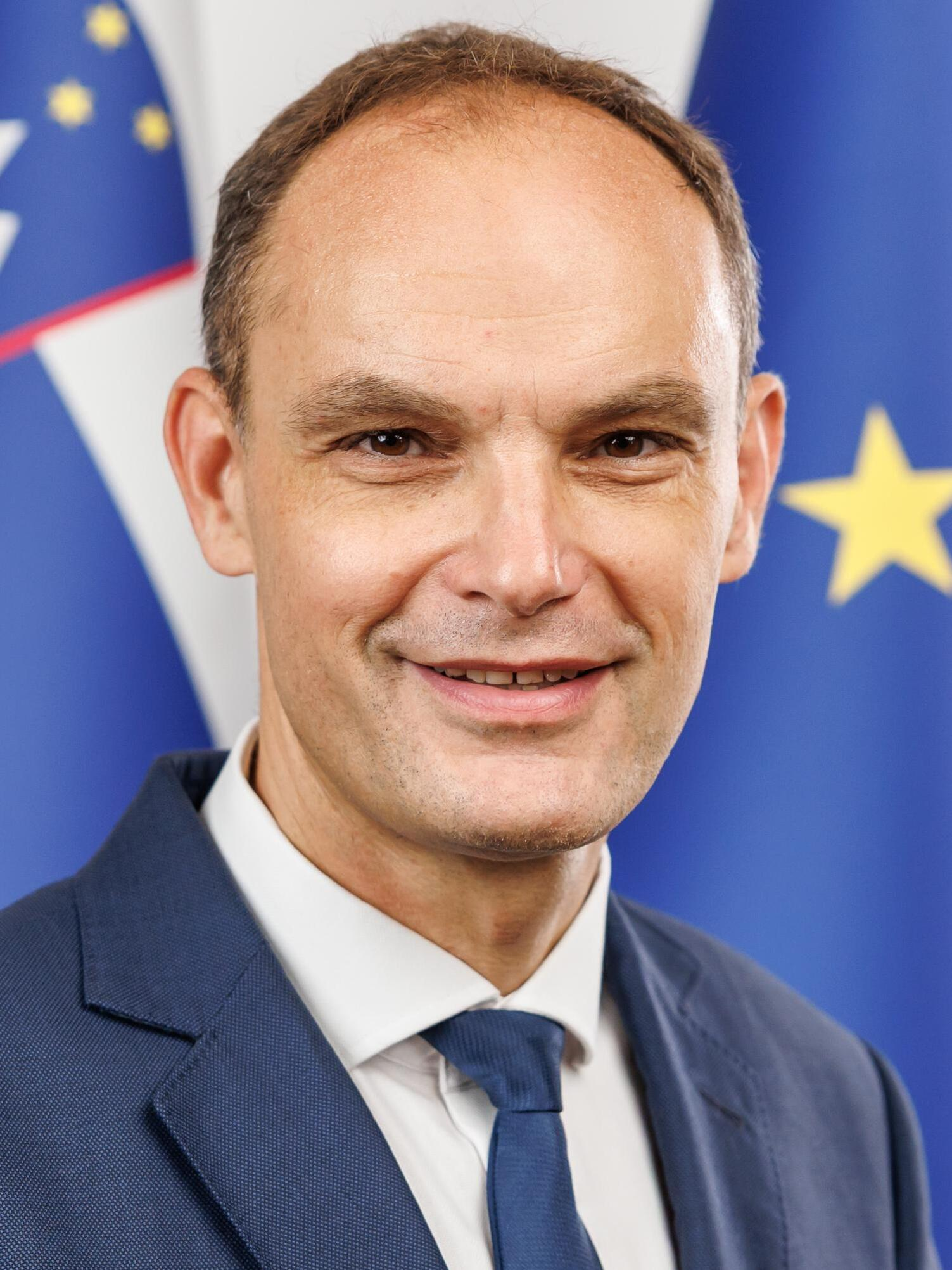
Anže Logar, Minister of Economy, Labour, and Sport (since 2026)

The current head of the department is Anže Logar, Minister of Economy, Labour, and Sport, who has served since 4 June 2026 in the 16th Government of Slovenia, led by Janez Janša.

The current name of the department has been used since 2026, when the department was renamed and acquired competences of the former Ministry of Labour, Family, Social Affairs and Equal Opportunities in the field of labor relations and employment rights.

== History of the ministry ==
- Ministry of Economy, Labour, and Sport (since 2026)
- Ministry of Economy, Tourism, and Sport (2023–2026)
- Ministry of Economic Development and Technology (2012–2023)
- Ministry of Economy (2000–2012)
- Ministry of Economic Relations and Development (1997–2000) and Ministry of Economic Activities (1993–2000)
- Ministry of Economic Activities (1993–2000)

== List of ministers ==
- Jože Mencinger, vice-president for Economy of the Executive Council of the Assembly of the Republic of Slovenia (16 May 1990 – 8 May 1991)
  - 1st Government of Slovenia (Peterle Cabinet)
- Andrej Ocvirk, vice-president for Economy of the Executive Council of the Assembly of the Republic of Slovenia (8 May 1991 – 14 May 1992)
  - 1st Government of Slovenia (Peterle Cabinet)
- Jožef Jeraj, Minister of Trade (12 February 1992 – 14 May 1992)
  - 1st Government of Slovenia (Peterle Cabinet)
- Viktor Brezar, President of the Republican Committee for Small Business (16 May 1990 – 14 May 1992)
  - 1st Government of Slovenia (Peterle Cabinet)
- Ingo Paš, President of the Republican Committee for Tourism and Hospitality (16 May 1990 – 14 May 1992)
  - 1st Government of Slovenia (Peterle Cabinet)
- Davorin Kračun, Minister of Planning (14 May 1992 – 25 January 1993); Minister of Economic Relations and Development (25 January 1993 – 26 January 1995)
  - 2nd Government of Slovenia (Drnovšek I Cabinet)
  - 3rd Government of Slovenia (Drnovšek II Cabinet)
- Dušan Šešok, Minister of Industry and Construction (14 May 1992 – 25 January 1993)
  - 2nd Government of Slovenia (Drnovšek I Cabinet)
- Jožef Jeraj, Minister of Trade (14 May 1992 – 23 September 1992)
  - 2nd Government of Slovenia (Drnovšek I Cabinet)
- Davorin Valentinčič, Minister of Trade (23 September 1992 – 25 January 1993)
  - 2nd Government of Slovenia (Drnovšek I Cabinet)
- Janez Sirše, Minister of Tourism and Hospitality (14 May 1992 – 25 January 1993)
  - 2nd Government of Slovenia (Drnovšek I Cabinet)
- Janko Deželak, Minister of Economic Relations and Development (26 January 1995 – 27 February 1997)
  - 3rd Government of Slovenia (Drnovšek II Cabinet)
- Maks Tajnikar, Minister of Economic Activities (25 January 1993 – 30 January 1996)
  - 3rd Government of Slovenia (Drnovšek II Cabinet)
- Metod Dragonja, Minister of Economic Activities (31 January 1996 – 20 April 1999)
  - 3rd Government of Slovenia (Drnovšek II Cabinet)
  - 4th Government of Slovenia (Drnovšek III Cabinet)
- Tea Petrin, Minister of Economy (20 April 1999 – 20 April 2004–7 June 2000; 30 November 2000 – 20 April 2004)
  - 4th Government of Slovenia (Drnovšek III Cabinet)
  - 6th Government of Slovenia (Drnovšek IV Cabinet)
  - 7th Government of Slovenia (Rop Cabinet)
- Janko Razgoršek, Minister of Small Business and Tourism (29 October 1997 – 7 June 2000)
  - 4th Government of Slovenia (Drnovšek III Cabinet)
- Marjan Senjur, Minister of Economic Relations and Development (27 February 1997 – 30 November 2000)
  - 4th Government of Slovenia (Drnovšek III Cabinet)
  - 5th Government of Slovenia (Bajuk Cabinet)
- Jože Zagožen, Minister of Economic Activities (7 June 2000 – 30 November 2000)
  - 5th Government of Slovenia (Bajuk Cabinet)
- Matej Lahovnik, Minister of Economy (20 April 2004 – 3 December 2004; 21 November 2008 – 9 July 2010)
  - 7th Government of Slovenia (Rop Cabinet)
  - 9th Government of Slovenia (Pahor Cabinet)
- Andrej Vizjak, Minister of Economy (3 December 2004 – 21 November 2008)
  - 8th Government of Slovenia (Janša I Cabinet)
- Darja Radić, Minister of Economy (16 July 2010 – 11 July 2011)
  - 9th Government of Slovenia (Pahor Cabinet)
- Mitja Gaspari, Minister of Economy (11 July 2011 – 10 February 2012)
  - 9th Government of Slovenia (Pahor Cabinet)
- Radovan Žerjav, Minister of Economic Development and Technology (10 February 2012 – 20 March 2013)
  - 10th Government of Slovenia (Janša II Cabinet)
- Stanko Stepišnik, Minister of Economic Development and Technology (20 March 2013 – 18 September 2014)
  - 11th Government of Slovenia (Bratušek Cabinet)
- Jožef Petrovič, Minister of Economic Development and Technology (18 September 2014 – 4 December 2014)
  - 12th Government of Slovenia (Cerar Cabinet)
- Zdravko Počivalšek, Minister of Economic Development and Technology (4 December 2014 – 1 June 2022)
  - 12th Government of Slovenia (Cerar Cabinet)
  - 13th Government of Slovenia (Šarec Cabinet)
  - 14th Government of Slovenia (Janša III Cabinet)
- Matjaž Han, Minister of Economy, Tourism, and Sport (1 June 2022 – 4 June 2026)
  - 15th Government of Slovenia (Golob Cabinet)
- Anže Logar, Minister of Economy, Labour, and Sport (since 4 June 2026)
  - 16th Government of Slovenia (Janša IV Cabinet)

== See also ==
- Government of Slovenia
