= Brezan =

Brezan (Sorbian: Brězan; Slovene: Brežan) is a surname with various origins. Notable people with the surname include:

- Jurij Brězan (1916–2006), Sorbian writer
- Uroš Brežan (born 1972), Slovene politician
