= 16th Government of Slovenia =

Incoming cabinet after the 2026 election

Janša IV Cabinet
- 16th Government of Slovenia
- Incumbent
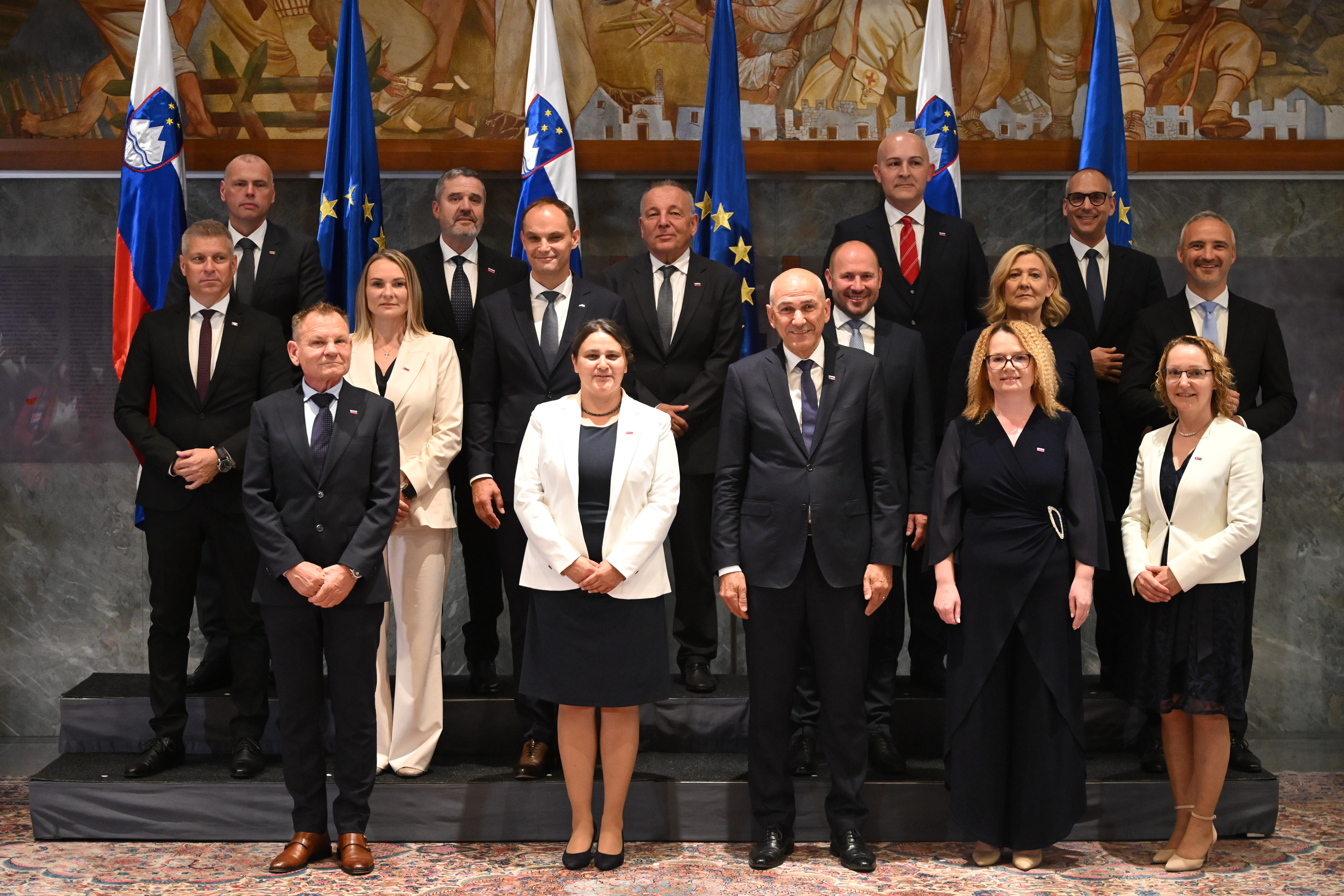
- Date formed: 4 June 2026

People and organisations
- President of the Republic: Nataša Pirc Musar
- Prime Minister: Janez Janša (SDS)
- Deputy Prime Minister: Jernej Vrtovec (NSi); Anže Logar (Demokrati.)
- No. of ministers: PM + 15 ministers (one without portfolio)
- Total no. of members: 16
- Member party: SDS; NSi; Demokrati.; SLS; FOKUS
- Status in legislature: Minority (coalition) (43 of 90 votes); Confidence and supply: Resni.ca (5); IMNS (2)
- Opposition party: Svoboda; SD; The Left; Vesna
- Opposition leader: Robert Golob (Svoboda); Matjaž Han (SD); Luka Mesec and Asta Vrečko (The Left); Uroš Macerl and Urša Zgojznik (Vesna)

History
- Election: 2026 election
- Legislature term: 10th National Assembly
- Predecessor: Golob Cabinet

The 16th Government of Slovenia (also known as the Janša IV Cabinet) is the fourth and current government of Prime Minister Janez Janša, leader of SDS, after taking office following the 2026 Slovenian parliamentary election. Janez Janša, leader of the SDS, was nominated as Prime Minister, and was appointed Prime Minister on 22 May 2026.

On May 21, 2026, SDS, NSi, SLS, Fokus and Demokrati signed a coalition agreement. The government is expected to become the second minority government, after the 13th Government (Šarec Cabinet), with 43 votes, 3 short of absolute majority in the 10th National Assembly. Confidence and supply is provided by Resni.ca with 5 votes and 2 representatives of the Italian and Hungarian national minorities.

== Composition of the government ==
=== Cabinet ===
Portfolio	Minister	Party	Took office	Left office
Prime Minister	Janez Janša	SDS	June 4, 2026	Incumbent
Deputy Prime Ministers
Minister of Economy, Labour, and Sport	Anže Logar	Demokrati.	June 4, 2026	Incumbent
Minister of Infrastructure and Energy	Jernej Vrtovec	NSi	June 4, 2026	Incumbent
Ministers
Minister of Finance	Andrej Šircelj	SDS	June 4, 2026	Incumbent
Minister of the Interior and Public Administration	Franci Matoz	SDS	June 4, 2026	Incumbent
Minister of Education, Science, and Youth	Borut Rončević	SDS	June 4, 2026	Incumbent
Minister of Health	Tadej Ostrc	Demokrati.	June 4, 2026	Incumbent
Minister of the Environment and Spatial Planning	Polona Rifelj	SDS	June 4, 2026	Incumbent
Minister of Demography, Family, and Social Affairs	Mateja Ribič	NSi	June 4, 2026	Incumbent
Minister of Justice	Mihael Zupančič	Demokrati.	June 4, 2026	Incumbent
Minister of Agriculture	Janez Cigler Kralj	NSi	June 4, 2026	Incumbent
Minister of Culture	Ignacija Fridl Jarc	SDS	June 4, 2026	Incumbent
Minister of Local Self-Government, Cohesion, and Regional Development	Monika Kirbiš Rojs	FOKUS	June 4, 2026	Incumbent
Minister of Defence	Valentin Hajdinjak	NSi	June 4, 2026	Incumbent
Minister of Foreign and European Affairs	Tone Kajzer	SDS	June 4, 2026	Incumbent
Minister without portfolio for Relations between the Republic of Slovenia and the Autochthonous Slovenian National Community in Neighbouring Countries, and between the Republic of Slovenia and Slovenians Abroad	Suzana Lep Šimenko	SDS	June 4, 2026	Incumbent

=== Government coalition ===
Party	Leader	Deputies		Ministers	
SDS	Janez Janša	28		7 + PM	
NSi	Jernej Vrtovec	7	9	4	5
SLS	Tina Bregant	1	9	0	5
FOKUS	Marko Lotrič	1	9	1	5
Demokrati.	Anže Logar	6		3	
Total (coalition)		43 / 90		15 + PM	
Confidence and supply
Resni.ca	Zoran Stevanović	5			
Representatives of the Italian and Hungarian national minorities	Felice Ziza; Ferenc Horváth	2			
Total (coalition + confidence and supply)		50 / 90			

=== Changes to ministries ===
- Ministry of Economy, Labour, and Sport is now responsible for all responsibilities of the former Ministry of the Economy, Tourism and Sport and also responsible for labour affairs (previously under the Ministry of Labor, Family, Social Affairs and Equal Opportunities);
- Ministry of the Interior and Public Administration is now responsible for all responsibilities of the former Ministry of the Interior, the former Ministry of Digital Transformation and the former Ministry of Public Administration, excluding local self-government;
- Ministry of Infrastructure and Energy is now responsible for all responsibilities of the former Ministry of Infrastructure and also responsible for energy and public transport (previously under the Ministry of the Environment, Climate, and Energy);
- Ministry of Education, Science, and Youth is now responsible for all responsibilities of the former Ministry of Education and former Ministry of Higher Education, Science and Innovation;
- Ministry of the Environment and Spatial Planning is now responsible for all responsibilities of the former Ministry of the Environment, Climate, and Energy, excluding energy and public transport, all responsibilities of the former Ministry of Natural Resources and Spatial Planning, and housing policy (previously under the Ministry of Solidarity-Based Future);
- Ministry of Demography, Family, and Social Affairs is now responsible for demography, all responsibilities of the former Ministry of Labor, Family, Social Affairs and Equal Opportunities, excluding labour affairs, all responsibilities of the former Ministry of Solidarity-Based Future, excluding housing policy; and
- Ministry of Local Self-Government, Cohesion, and Regional Development is now responsible for local self-government (previously under the Ministry of Public Administration), and all responsibilities of the former Ministry of Cohesion and Regional Development.

No changes are made to the following ministries:

- Ministry of Foreign and European Affairs;
- Ministry of Finance;
- Ministry of Health;
- Ministry of Justice;
- Ministry of Agriculture (renamed from Ministry of Agriculture, Forestry, and Food);
- Ministry of Culture; and
- Ministry of Defence.

Abolished ministries (compared to the 15th Government) include:

- Ministry of Digital Transformation (now part of the Ministry of the Interior and Public Administration);
- Ministry of Public Administration (now part of the Ministry of the Interior and Public Administration and the Ministry of Local Self-Government, Cohesion, and Regional Development);
- Ministry of Solidarity-Based Future (now part of the Ministry of Demography, Family, and Social Affairs);
- Ministry of Natural Resources and Spatial Planning (now part of the Ministry of the Environment and Spatial Planning); and
- Ministry of Education (now part of the Ministry of Education, Science, and Youth).

== Working bodies ==
Body	President
Committee on State Administration and Public Affairs	Franci Matoz, Minister of the Interior and Public Administration
Committee on the Economy	Jernej Vrtovec, Minister of Infrastructure and Energy
Commission for Administrative Affairs and Appointments	Borut Rončević, Minister of Education, Science, and Youth

=== Državni sekretarji ===
Ministry	Minister	Secretary	Competent for	Start of term	End of term
Ministry of Economy, Labor, and Sports	Anže Logar	Štefan Kušar	field of labor	5 June 2026	
Ministry of Economy, Labor, and Sports	Anže Logar	Katja Koren	turism and sports	5 June 2026	
Ministry of Economy, Labor, and Sports	Anže Logar	Leon Korošec	economy	24 June 2026	
Ministry of Foreign Affairs	Tone Kajzer	Stanislav Raščan	international law, multilateralism, economic diplomacy, development and humanitarian aid, security affairs	5 June 2026	
Ministry of Foreign Affairs	Tone Kajzer	Tamara Weingerl Požar	European and political affairs	5 June 2026	
Ministry of Infrastructure and Energetics	Jernej Vrtovec	Damijan Jaklin	infrastructure	5 June 2026	
Ministry of Infrastructure and Energetics	Jernej Vrtovec	Tomaž Žagar	energetics	5 June 2026	
Ministry of Infrastructure and Energetics	Jernej Vrtovec	Marko Dvornik	mobility and transport	6 July 2026	
Ministry of the Interior and Public Administration	Franci Matoz	Franc Kangler	police, international protection, migration	5	
Ministry of the Interior and Public Administration	Franci Matoz	Božo Predalič	inspectorates, public sector, labor unions, quality, pay system (excluding the police), weapons	5 June 2026	
Ministry of the Interior and Public Administration	Franci Matoz	Denis Zobarič	administrative and internal affairs (non-armed), combating human trafficking, private security, public procurement, Police academy, European affairs and international cooperation, digitalization, logistics	19 June 2026	
Ministry of Health	Tadej Ostrc	Vesna Marinko	—	5 June 2026	10 September 2026
Ministry of Health	Tadej Ostrc	Tea Košir	—	10 June 2026	15 October 2026
Ministry of Health	Tadej Ostrc	Dragana Savić Kuleto	digitization of healthcare	10 September 2026	
Ministry of Health	Tadej Ostrc	Simon Novak	secondary and tertiary healthcare	10 September 2026	
Ministry of Finance	Andrej Šircelj	Maja Hostnik Kališek	taxes, customs duties, and other levies	5 June 2026	
Ministry of Finance	Andrej Šircelj	Peter Papež	public assets and the financial system	5 June 2026	
Ministry of Finance	Andrej Šircelj	Kristina Šteblaj	fiscal policy, budget, public accounting	5 June 2026	
Ministry of Finance	Andrej Šircelj	Miran Vičič	financial system	October 2026	
Ministry of Agriculture	Janez Cigler Kralj	Mojca Erjavec	agriculture	5 June 2026	
Ministry of Agriculture	Janez Cigler Kralj	Velislav Žvipelj	forestry, hunting, food, fishing	5 June 2026	
Ministry of Defence	Valentin Hajdinjak	Erik Kopač	coordination of the operations of the Slovenian Armed Forces, defense policy, defence affairs, logistics, the Office of the Secretary General, and intelligence and security services	5 June 2026	
Ministry of Defence	Valentin Hajdinjak	Vida Čadonič Špelič	coordination of activities in the areas of civil protection and rescue, inspectorates for protection against natural and other disasters and for defence, war veterans and military heritage, internal audit, and cooperation with labor unions	5 June 2026	
Ministry of the Environment and Spatial Planning	Polona Rifelj	Peter Lovšin	spatial planning, construction, and housing	5 June 2026	
Ministry of the Environment and Spatial Planning	Polona Rifelj	Iztok Slatinšek	regulatory relief and simplification of procedures	1 July 2026	
Ministry of Local Self-Government, Cohesion, and Regional Development	Monika Kirbiš Rojs	Rok Šimenc	cohesion politics	5 June 2026	
Ministry of Local Self-Government, Cohesion, and Regional Development	Monika Kirbiš Rojs	Ivan Meglič	local self-government and regional development	5 June 2026	
Ministry of Justice	Mihael Zupančič	Barbara Levstik Šega	civil law, organizational law, judicial administration, probation, Children's Home	10 June 2026	
Ministry of Justice	Mihael Zupančič	Gašper Dovžan	penal law, enforcement of criminal sanctions, international legal cooperation	12 June 2026	
Ministry of Culture	Ignacija Fridl Jarc	Uršula Menih Dokl	—	5 June 2026	
Ministry of Demography, Family, and Social Affairs	Mateja Ribič	Andrej Štesl	elderly, long-term care, deinstitutionalization, people with disabilities	5 June 2026	
Ministry of Demography, Family, and Social Affairs	Mateja Ribič	Tomislav Nemec	demographics, family, social affairs, equal opportunities	19 June 2026	
Ministry of Education, Science, and Youth	Borut Rončević	Mojca Škrinjar	pre-university education and youth	5 June 2026	
Ministry of Education, Science, and Youth	Borut Rončević	Rok Strašek	higher education, science, and innovation	5 June 2026	
Government Office for Slovenians Abroad	Suzana Lep Šimenko	Helena Jaklitsch	—	5 June 2026	

== Formation and election ==
=== Election of prime minister-designate ===
Following a decision by the President Pirc Musar to not propose a candidate in the first round of election of a Prime Minister-designate, on May 19, 2026, group of 48 deputies (SDS, NSi, SLS, Fokus, Demokrati. and Resni.ca) proposed Janez Janša (SDS) as a candidate for the prime-minister designate in the second round. On May 22, 2026, Janez Janša was elected Prime Minister-designate with 51 votes, receiving at least one vote of support from future opposition deputies.

==== May 22, 2026 election of the prime-minister designate ====
Candidate	Voting	Valid	Invalid	In favor	Against	Notes	Source
Janez Janša (SDS)	87	87	0	51	36	Secret ballot, absolute majority (46 votes) needed	

=== Appointment of the government ===
Janez Janša, Prime Minister-designate, had to propose a list of ministers to the National Assembly within 15 days from his election. The National Assembly committees hold hearing of proposed candidates for ministers. The National Assembly appoints the government with relative majority.

On May 28, 2026, Janez Janša proposed a list of candidates for ministers. Despite previous speculations, SLS, as part of the NSi, SLS, Fokus list and a coalition party, did not propose its own candidate for one of the ministries. The competent committees held hearings of the candidate on 1-2 June 2026.

==== June 4, 2026 vote on the appointment of the government ====
Candidate	Voting	In favor	Against	Source
16th Government of Slovenia Prime Minister Janez Janša (SDS)	79	49	30	

== Policy ==
=== Foreign policy ===
The day after, Janez Janša assumed his role as Prime Minister and ordered the removal of the Palestinian flag from the government building (In its place now fly the Slovenian, European, and Ukrainian flags). The Israeli Foreign Minister Gideon Sa'ar announced that Israel would open an embassy in Ljubljana, its first resident diplomatic mission in Slovenia.

All sanctions on Israel, including the arms embargo, travel bans on Israeli politicians, and bans on Jewish imports from Judea and Samaria, were lifted. On 27 June 2026, Janša reiterated to Israeli media his intention that the Slovenian embassy to Israel in Tel Aviv would be relocated to Jerusalem. President Nataša Pirc Musar, as well as the confidence and supply party Resni.ca, voiced opposition to the relocation.
