= Mateja Ribič =

Slovenian jurist and politician (born 1977)

- Official portrait, 2026

Minister of Demography, Family, and Social Affairs
- Incumbent
- Assumed office 4 June 2026
- Prime Minister: Janez Janša
- Preceded by: Luka Mesec

Personal details
- Born: 6 September 1977 (age 49)
- Education: University of Maribor

Mateja Ribič (born 6 September 1977) is a Slovenian jurist and politician. She has been serving as Minister of Demography, Family, and Social Affairs of Slovenia since 2026.

== Early life and education ==
Ribič was born on 6 September 1977. In 2001, she graduated with a law degree from the University of Maribor.

== Career ==
Her professional career began after she graduated, and she held senior management positions in the public sector and the pharmacy sector. She was director of a care home between 2013 and 2020 in Trebnje, and from March 2020 to June 2022 she served as State Secretary at the Ministry of Labour, Family, Social Affairs and Equal Opportunities, where, during the COVID-19 pandemic, she was involved in the implementation of safety measures for social care institutions and policies aimed at the care of older people.

In May 2026 Ribič was announced as the Minister of the Demography, Family, and Social Affairs of the Janša new cabinet, nominated by New Slovenia.

On 2 June, Ribič presented her priorities as minister to a National Assembly committee, including reducing burocracy in admissions and administrative procedures for care homes, preventing the misuse of social benefits, free pre-school education, encouraging the birth rate, and promoting the inclusion and employability of people with disabilities. Her nomination as minister was approved by that committee.

Ribič was sworn in on 4 June 2026.
