= LGBTQ rights in Slovenia =

- Location of Slovenia (dark green) – in Europe (light green & dark grey) – in the European Union (light green) – [Legend]
- Legal status: Male legal since 1977, female legal since 1951
- Military: LGBT people allowed to openly serve
- Discrimination protections: Sexual orientation, gender identity and gender expression protections

Family rights
- Recognition of relationships: Registered same-sex partnership between 2006 and 2022; Same-sex marriage since 2022
- Adoption: Full adoption rights since 2022

Lesbian, gay, bisexual, transgender, and queer (LGBTQ) rights in Slovenia have significantly evolved over time, and are considered among the most advanced of the former communist countries. Slovenia was the first post-communist country to have legalised same-sex marriage, and anti-discrimination laws regarding sexual orientation and gender identity have existed nationwide since 2016.

== LGBT history in Slovenia ==
Under the Penal Code of 30 June 1959, male homosexual acts were illegal in all of (now former) Yugoslavia. As part of overall constitutional reforms during the first half of the 1970s, the power to set penal legislation was devolved from the federal level to Yugoslavia's eight constituent republics and provinces. Slovenia passed a new penal code in 1976 that decriminalised homosexual intercourse when it came into force in 1977. All discriminatory provisions were removed. There had been no references to lesbian relationships in the old legislation.

== Legality of same-sex sexual activity ==
Same-sex sexual activity has been legal since 1977. Age of consent is 15 years, regardless of gender and sexual orientation.

== Recognition of same-sex relationships ==
Registered partnership for same-sex couples has been legal since 23 July 2006, with limited inheritance, social security and next-of-kin rights.

In July 2009, the Constitutional Court held that Article 22 of the Registration of Same Sex Partnerships Act (RSSPA) violated the right to non-discrimination under Article 14 of the Constitution on the ground of sexual orientation, and required that the legislature remedy the established inconsistency within six months.

On 3 March 2015, the Assembly passed the bill to legalize same-sex marriage in a 51–28 vote. On 10 March 2015, the National Council rejected a motion to require the Assembly to vote on the bill again, in a 14–23 vote. Opponents of the bill launched a petition for a referendum. The petitioners have gained more than enough signatures for a referendum. On 22 October 2015, in a 5–4 vote, the Constitutional Court ruled the National Assembly could not interpret the constitution and that the vote to block the referendum was illegal. Slovenian Catholic groups, and Pope Francis urged people to vote against the same-sex marriage bill. The referendum took place on 20 December 2015 and the bill was rejected.

On 21 April 2016, the Assembly approved the bill to give same-sex partnerships all rights of marriage, except joint adoption and in vitro fertilisation. A petition for a referendum was launched, but the president of the Assembly did not allow the referendum. He said that it was an abuse of the referendum law. The law took effect on 24 May 2016 and it became operational on 24 February 2017 without changes in marriage (only civil partnership).

On 16 June 2022, the Constitutional Court of Slovenia voted in a court decision that the statutory definition of marriage as a living community of a husband and a wife is unconstitutional, thus legalising same-sex marriage. The court decision was published on 8 July 2022 and came into force a day later, on 9 July. The National Assembly passed the act implementing the decision on 4 October 2022 in a 48–29 vote. On 11 October, the act was vetoed by the National Council, but it was reconfirmed by the National Assembly in a 51–24 vote on 18 October.

A new law legalizing same-sex marriage and allowing same-sex couples to jointly adopt children in Slovenia, came into effect on January 31, 2023. The ability to enter into registered same-sex partnerships has been closed off since the new same-sex marriage law took effect.

== Discrimination protections ==
Since 2003, discrimination on basis of sexual orientation in workplaces has been banned. The same goes for employment seekers. Discrimination on the basis of sexual orientation is also banned in a variety of other fields, including education, housing and the provision of goods and services. The anti-discrimination laws however, are vague and open to interpretation and thus, very rarely enforced. In July 2009, the Constitutional Court held that Article 14(1) of the Slovenian Constitution bans discrimination based on sexual orientation.

On 17 February 2016, the government introduced new anti-discrimination bill, which prohibits discrimination based on sexual orientation, gender identity and gender expression, among others. It was approved by the National Assembly on 21 April, in a 50–17 vote. The National Council did not require the Assembly to vote on the bill again. On 28 April, the union of migrant workers SDMS filed a motion, with required 2,500 signatures, in order to be allowed to proceed with the petition for referendum. However, on 5 May, the Speaker of the National Assembly Milan Brglez refused to set a 35-day deadline during which the proposers could collect 40,000 valid signatures to force the referendum, arguing that this and several other SDMS referendum initiatives constitutes an abuse of the referendum laws. He sent the bill for promulgation the next day. It was promulgated by President Borut Pahor and published in the official journal on 9 May 2016. On 10 May, SDMS challenged the Brglez's decision to the Constitutional Court. In July 2016, the Constitutional Court rejected the challenge.

== Public opinion ==
A Eurobarometer survey published in December 2006 showed that 31% of Slovenians surveyed support same-sex marriage and 17% think homosexuals should be allowed to adopt children (EU-wide average 44% and 33%).

A poll conducted by Delo Stik in February 2015 showed that 59% of Slovenians surveyed supported same-sex marriage, while 38% supported adoptions by same-sex couples. The poll also gauged support for the same-sex marriage bill, which was debated in the National Assembly at the time. The results showed that a narrow majority (51%) of Slovenians surveyed supported the bill.

The 2023 Eurobarometer found that 62% of Slovenians thought same-sex marriage should be allowed throughout Europe, and 58% agreed that "there is nothing wrong in a sexual relationship between two persons of the same sex". However, only 42% of respondents agreed with the statement that "lesbian, gay, bisexual people should have the same rights as heterosexual people (marriage, adoption, parental rights)", which was well below the EU average of 69%.

== LGBT movement in Slovenia ==
The lesbian and gay movement has been active in Ljubljana since 1984, when MAGNUS, the gay section at ŠKUC (Student Cultural and Art Centre, Ljubljana), was founded as the "Cultural Organisation for Socialisation of Homosexuality." A pro-lesbian feminist group, Lilit, was started in 1985, followed in 1987 by LL, a lesbian group within ŠKUC. In 1990 Magnus and LL founded the national lesbian and gay campaigning organisation, Roza Klub.

Other parts of the country have no or very few organizations regarding sexual orientation.

== Social conditions ==
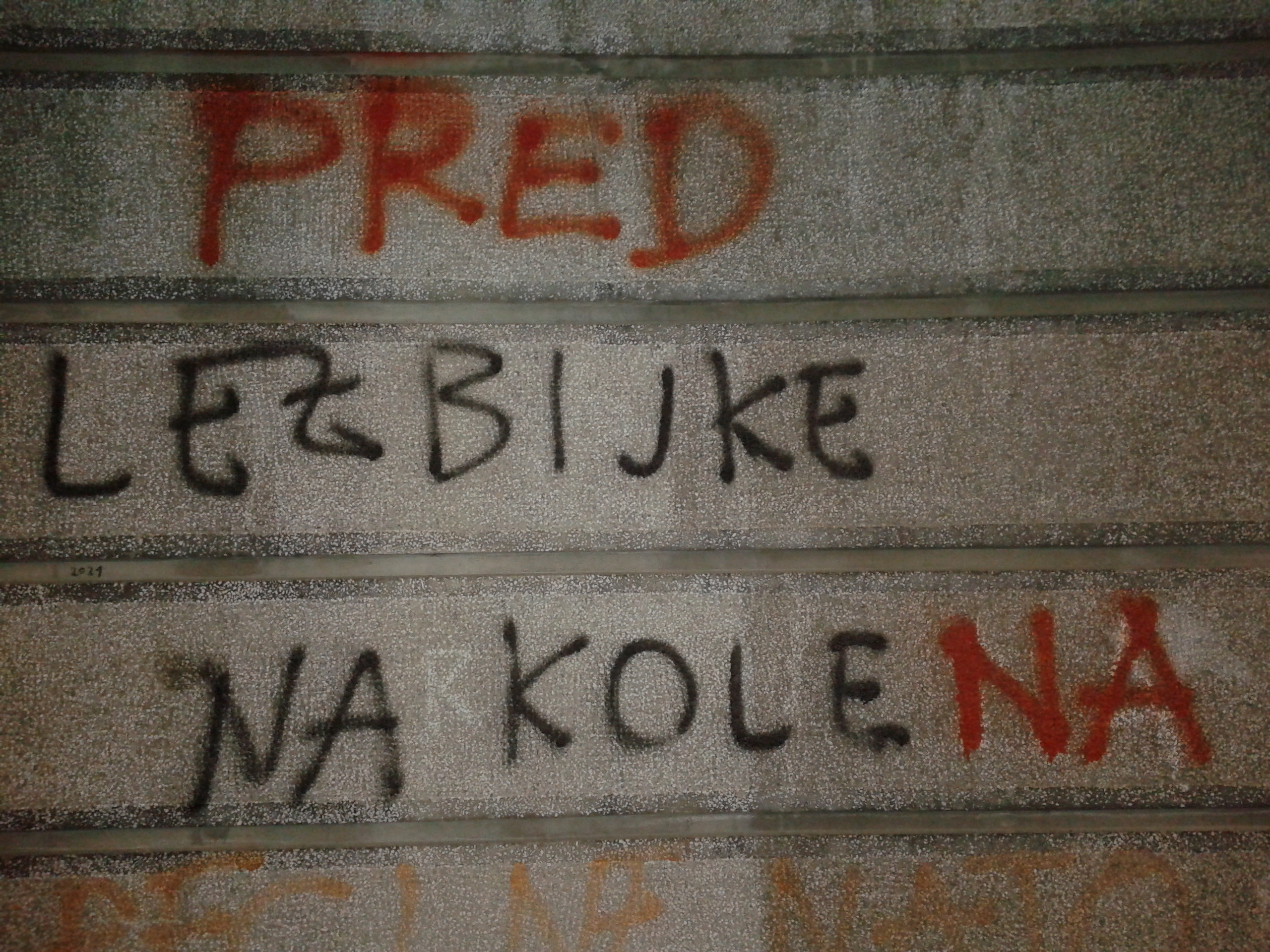
A graffiti in Kranj that originally read Lezbijke na kole ("[Impale] lesbians on stakes" in Slovene), later modified to Pred lezbijke na kolena ("Kneel before the lesbians")

=== Gay culture ===
In Ljubljana there are many gay-friendly clubs and bars. Having started with only a few, the number increases every year. At klub K4 in Ljubljana there are gay and lesbian parties (K4 ROZA) one Saturday a month. At clubs Factory and Bolivar there are gay and lesbian parties organized by Jing Jang group. Parties take place there usually once a month. Other gay-friendly bars and clubs in Ljubljana are Lan, Tiffany and Galerija.

=== Anti-LGBT violence ===
There have been a number of high-profile instances of anti-gay attacks in Slovenia, including in June 2009 during a literary event at one of the famous gay bars in Ljubljana, Open. Gay rights activist and radio journalist Mitja Blažič was hospitalized following the attack by eight black-masked younger males with torches. Two years before this incident in Maribor, several individuals were beaten up by younger males during a Pride parade.

In March 2019, a brick was thrown through the window of Društvo DIH – Enakopravni pod mavrico, an LGBT NGO. The same year, a gay man was beaten by several individuals in Murska Sobota, suffering kidney injuries and several broken ribs. That November, a group of individuals vandalized an LGBT club, Tiffany, in the early morning hours at Metelkova in Ljubljana, and threatened the staff with violence.

==== 2023 Pride Parade ====
In June 2023, the annual Pride Parade took place in Ljubljana, beginning in the autonomous zone of Metelkova and proceeding along Masaryk Street, passing Bavarski Dvor, and culminating at Congress Square, where speeches and a concert by musician Masayah were held. It had approximately 3,500 participants and was also attended by the President of Slovenia, Nataša Pirc Musar, who addressed the participants. The event was held under the slogan "Več skupnosti, en boj" (More communities, one fight), and it marked the culmination of a series of multi-day festival events, emphasizing calls for solidarity and the collective struggle for human dignity worldwide. (Note: Musar's address: "Pride is a powerful emotion that can inspire positive change. When people take to the streets with pride and confidence, they show others that acceptance is crucial and that love is the driving force that enriches us and makes us better, good, and noble. Love has no labels, no explanations. It is what it is, pure and simple. Love is the water of life." and "The Pride Parade is more than just a colorful event and rainbow flags. It is an expression of advocating for human dignity. It is a protest with a clear message that every person, regardless of their sexual orientation, gender identity, or gender expression, deserves respect, love, and equal treatment.")

During and after the parade, attendees faced threats, violence, insults, flag burnings, and destruction of private property. An unknown perpetrator threw a bottle at the window of the Pritličje establishment where a rainbow flag was displayed. Members of the youth wing of Janez Janša's Slovenian Democratic Party (SDS) attempted to provoke parade participants by using biblical arguments that "there are only two genders." Zala Klopčič, an activist and influencer, argued on the street that God created humans in his image, referring to men and women, dismissing other gender identities as propaganda. Social media posts from individuals associated with the SDS youth wing expressed anti-LGBTIQ+ sentiments, while others, including former SDS youth leader Dominik Štrakl and Urban Purgar, a prominent figure associated with the Identitarian movement, made antisemitic and homophobic remarks. The SDS youth wing claimed to be victims of LGBTIQ+ intolerance, using the tactic of projecting their actions onto others. During the Pride march, police officers in Ljubljana received a report of an unidentified suspect who physically assaulted two people, causing minor injuries.

Katja Sešek, a representative of the Pride Parade Association, told Radio Slovenia that there had not been such hostility for years. Mitja Blažič, a long-time activist and previous victim of similar attacks, highlighted the multiple instances of violence, homophobia, and transphobia during the Pride Parade as unprecedented and unsettling. (Note: Blažič's statement: "Broken glass at Pritličje, kids on motorcycles shouting 'fuck you, faggots,' a beaten girl with a rainbow flag at Bavarski Dvor, a group of young people flipping the bird right there, protesters of the SDS youth wing's anti-LGBT campaign on the Slovene Street, news of verbal and physical violence on social media all night, burned rainbow flags, public confession of the so-called Yellow Vests that they organized attacks on parade participants... I haven't seen this much violent homophobia and transphobia at Ljubljana Pride, along with such a police presence, since 2001 when we first marched. A sinister feeling accompanied me throughout the evening, and for the first time, I wiped off the rainbow from my face as I left the Congress Square. I don't think this is a coincidence.") The Human Rights Ombudsman Peter Svetina, the President of the National Assembly Urška Klakočar Zupančič, and the President Pirc Musar condemned the acts of intolerance and violence, emphasising the importance of respecting human rights and the freedom to express one's sexual orientation. The police are investigating reports of physical attacks, theft, and disturbances of public order related to the event. On 20 June, the violence was also condemned by Prime Minister Robert Golob. The president of the leading opposition party (SDS) Janez Janša and Janša's party did not respond to the incidents. Additionally, the Minister of Justice Dominika Švarc Pipan and the Minister of Interior Boštjan Poklukar remained silent on the matter.

== Summary table ==
| Same-sex sexual activity legal | Yes (Since 1977) |
| Equal age of consent (15) | Yes (Since 1977) |
| Anti-discrimination laws in employment | Yes (Since 2003) |
| Anti-discrimination laws in the provision of goods and services | Yes (Since 2009) |
| Anti-discrimination laws in all other areas (incl. hate speech) | Yes (Since 2009) |
| Anti-discrimination laws covering gender identity or expression in all areas | Yes (Since 2016) |
| Same-sex marriage | Yes (Since 2022) |
| Recognition of same-sex couples | Yes (Since 2006) |
| Stepchild adoption by same-sex couples | Yes (Since 2011) |
| Joint adoption by same-sex couples | Yes (Since 2022) |
| Adoption by a single LGBT person | Yes |
| LGBT people allowed to serve openly in the military | Yes |
| Right to change legal gender | Yes |
| Gender self-identification | No |
| Homosexuality declassified as an illness | Yes |
| Access to IVF for lesbian couples | Yes (Since 2024) |
| Conversion therapy banned by law | No |
| Commercial surrogacy for gay male couples | No (Banned for all couples) |
| MSMs allowed to donate blood | Yes (Since 2022) |

== See also ==
- Human rights in Slovenia
- LGBT rights in Europe
- LGBT rights in the European Union
