= Ministry for Cohesion and Regional Development of Slovenia =

Government ministry of Slovenia

Ministry for Cohesion and Regional Development
- Ministrstvo za kohezijo in regionalni razvoj Republike Slovenije

Agency overview
- Formed: 24 January 2023
- Headquarters: Kotnikova 5, 1000 Ljubljana, Slovenia; 46°3′N 14°31′E
- Agency executive: Aleksander Jevšek, Minister for Cohesion and Regional Development
- Website: www.gov.si/drzavni-organi/ministrstva/ministrstvo-za-kohezijo-in-regionalni-razvoj/

The Ministry for Cohesion and Regional Development is a government ministry of Slovenia responsible for regional development policy and the management of European cohesion funds, including the European Structural Funds and the Cohesion Fund.

The ministry is headquartered in Ljubljana. The current Minister for Cohesion and Regional Development is Aleksander Jevšek.

== Responsibilities ==
The Ministry for Cohesion and Regional Development is responsible for:

- planning and implementing regional development policies,
- coordination and absorption of European Union cohesion funds,
- management of the European Structural and Investment Funds,
- international cooperation in regional and cohesion policy,
- promoting balanced regional development across Slovenia.

The minister is a member of the Government of Slovenia.

== History ==
The ministry was established on 24 January 2023 following an amendment to the Government Act, when the 15th Government of Slovenia reorganised the former Government Office for Development and European Cohesion Policy (SVRK) into a full ministry.

The predecessor body was established in 2014 as a government office responsible for development and EU cohesion policy. Initially, it was led by a minister without portfolio responsible for development, strategic projects, and cohesion.

With the 2023 reform, the office was elevated to ministerial level, strengthening its role in managing European funds and regional development policy.

== Structure ==
The ministry consists of the Minister and their cabinet, as well as several organisational units, including:

- Minister's Cabinet
- International Cooperation Division
- Smart Specialisation Coordination Division
- Managing Authority Service
- Internal Audit Service
- Cohesion Policy Office
- European Territorial Cooperation and Financial Mechanisms Office
- General Affairs Office

Senior administrative staff are career civil servants, while the Minister and their cabinet are political appointees.

== Ministers ==
The office responsible for cohesion policy has been led by the following officials:

=== Ministers without portfolio for development, strategic projects and cohesion ===
- Violeta Bulc (2014)
- Alenka Smerkolj (2014–2018)
- Marko Bandelli (2018)
- Iztok Purič (2018–2019)
- Angelika Mlinar (2019–2020)
- Zvonko Černač (2020–2022)
- Aleksander Jevšek (2022–2023)

=== Ministers for Cohesion and Regional Development ===
- Aleksander Jevšek (2023– )

== See also ==
- Government of Slovenia
- Regional policy of the European Union
- Cohesion Fund
- Structural Funds and Investment Funds
