= Bojan Kumer =

Slovenian politician (born 1974)

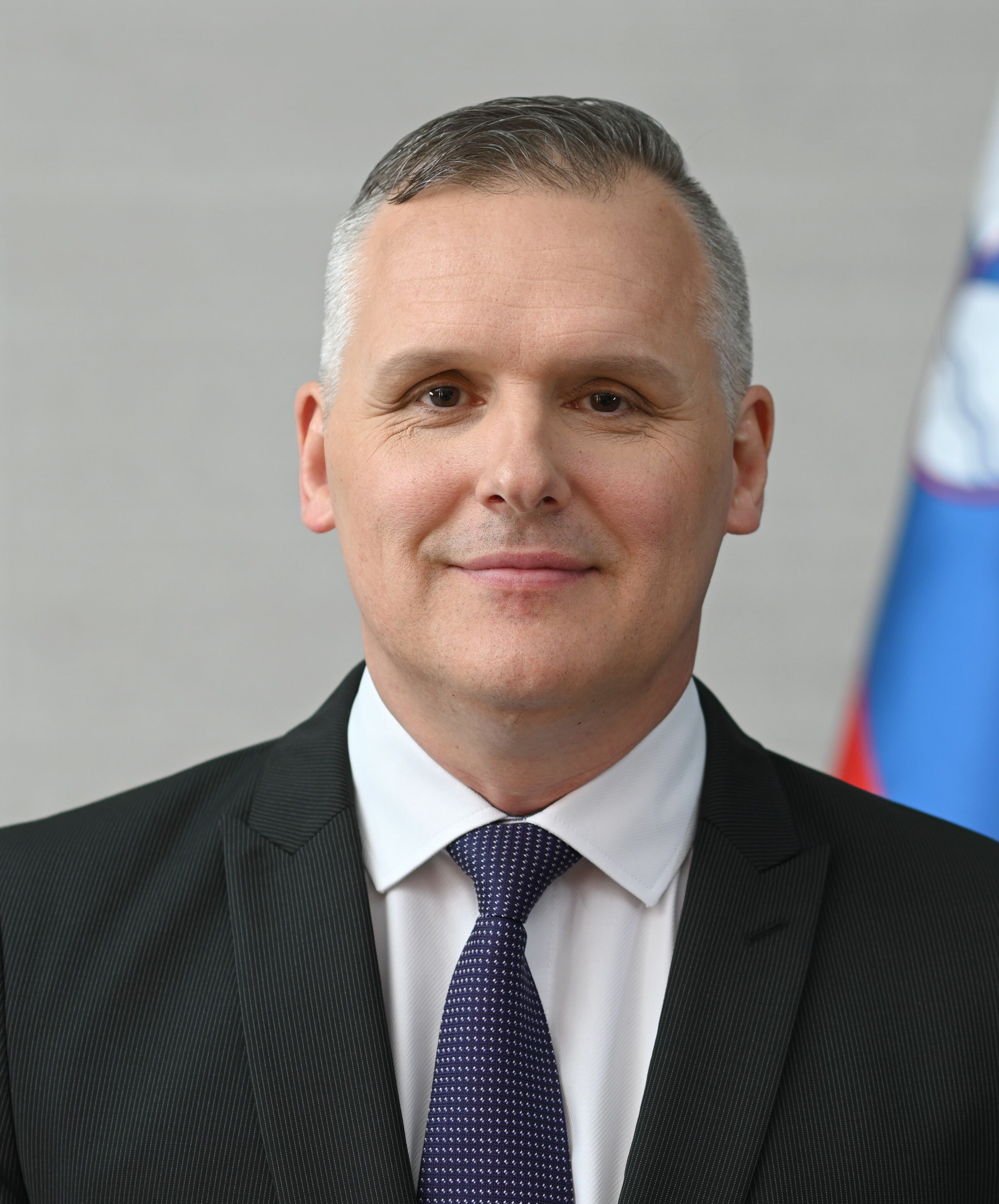
- Official portrait, 2022

Minister of the Environment, Climate and Energy
- In office 24 January 2023 – 4 June 2026
- Prime Minister: Robert Golob
- Preceded by: Uroš Brežan (Environment and Spatial Planning); Himself (Infrastructure)
- Succeeded by: Polona Rifelj (Environment and Spatial Planning); Jernej Vrtovec (Infrastructure and Energy)

Minister of Infrastructure
- In office 1 June 2022 – 9 January 2023
- Prime Minister: Robert Golob
- Preceded by: Jernej Vrtovec
- Succeeded by: Alenka Bratušek; Himself (Environment, Climate and Energy)

State Secretary at the Ministry of Infrastructure
- In office September 2018 – 2021

Personal details
- Born: 30 July 1974 (age 52) Slovenj Gradec
- Party: Freedom Movement

Bojan Kumer (born 30 July 1974) is a Slovenian politician. He serves as the minister of infrastructure of the Republic of Slovenia since 2022.

== Early life and career ==
Bojan Kumer was born in Slovenj Gradec on 30 July 1974. He attended the University of Ljubljana where he studied electrical engineering. He holds a Bachelor of Science in electrical engineering and also a master's degree in the same field.

In 2001, he worked at Elektro Celje where he served as the head of the procurement and sale of electricity. He was subsequently appointed head of the unit, and thereafter the executive director of Elektro Celje. In 2009, he was appointed project manager of GEN Energija in charge of development of operations abroad. In 2010, he became the head of service for sales. In 2013, he was appointed general secretary at the Ministry of Infrastructure by the Government of the Republic of Slovenia. While serving as general secretary, he was appointed executive director of Elektro energija. Subsequently, he assumed a position as sales director of GEN-I in 2018.

In September 2018, he was reassigned as the state secretary at the Ministry of Infrastructure in the government of Marjan Šarec. On 1 June 2022, he was appointed Minister of Infrastructure in the government of Robert Golob.
