= Polona Rifelj =

Slovenian economist and politician (born 1973)

- Official portrait, 2026

Minister of the Environment and Spatial Planning
- Incumbent
- Assumed office 4 June 2026
- Prime Minister: Janez Janša
- Preceded by: Jože Novak (Spatial Planning); Bojan Kumer (Environment)

Personal details
- Born: 30 August 1973 (age 53) Celje, PR Slovenia, Yugoslavia
- Party: Slovenian Democratic Party
- Education: University of Ljubljana

Polona Rifelj (born 30 August 1973) is a Slovenian economist and politician. She has been serving as Minister of the Environment and Spatial Planning of Slovenia since 2026.

== Early life and education ==
Rifelj was born on 30 August 1973 in Celje, PR Slovenia, Yugoslavia. She got a degree in communication studies and economics, and a master's degree in politician science. Rifelj also have studies in financial forensics.

== Career ==
She has worked as director of the Celje Central Library since 2013.

Rifelj is member of the Slovenian Democratic Party (SDS) and her political career began in her hometown's city council, and worked for the Ministry of Agriculture. She also worked for the European Commission and the International Organization for Migration with responsabilities on democratisation processes in third world countries, and the Slovenian Equestrian Federetion and the Legal Affairs Committee of the Slovenian Olympic Committee. In 2021 Rifelj was appointed State Secretary for economy in the office of Prime Minister Janez Janša.

In the 2026 parliamentary election, Rifelj was a Let's Connect Slovenia candidate to the National Assembly for Celje 2 constituency, but was not elected. In May 2026 Rifelj was announced as the Minister of the Environment and Spatial Planning of the Janša new cabinet.

She presented her career and her main proposals to the members of the National Assembly on 2 June. Rifelj announced that she would prioritise flood prevention, the circular economy and recycling, as well as streamlining administrative permits and simplifying environmental impact assessments. She also proposed auditing controversial projects, such as the C0 canal, and updating the Natura 2000 document. On the issue of housing, she proposed increasing the amount of land available for development, speeding up construction and refurbishing empty buildings to facilitate access to housing, particularly for young people.

Rifelj was sworn in on 4 June 2026.
