= Ignacija Fridl Jarc =

Slovenian philosopher, scholar and politician (born 1968)

- Official portrait, 2026

Minister of Culture
- Incumbent
- Assumed office 4 June 2026
- Prime Minister: Janez Janša
- Preceded by: Asta Vrečko

Personal details
- Born: 2 April 1968 (age 58) Slovenj Gradec, PR Slovenia, Yugoslavia
- Party: Slovenian Democratic Party

Ignacija Fridl Jarc (born 2 April 1968) is a Slovenian philosopher, literary critic, translator and politician. She has been serving as Minister of Culture of Slovenia since 2026.

== Early life and education ==
Fridl Jarc was born on 2 April 1968 in Slovenj Gradec, PR Slovenia, Yugoslavia. She got a degree in comparative studies and a PhD in 2006 in philosophy with a thesis Plato’s Doctrine of Truth from the Perspective of Beauty and Art.

== Career ==
She have a career in cultural criticism, teaching and institutional management. She also worked at the Slovenec newspaper and at the University of Ljubljana as an assistant teacher of History of the Philosophy, before spending a decade working in management and design in the private sector. In 2018, Fridl Jarc joined the cultural institution Slovenska matica as secretary-editor, where she subsequently took on responsibilities for the management of its activities and professional services. At the same time, she pursued an academic career at the Nova University, where she served as Dean of the Faculty of Slovenian and International Studies between 2023 and 2024 and has taught courses on Slovenian literature and culture.

Her academic work has focused, amongst other topics, on the philosophy of Plato and Slovenian literature. She is the author of the monograph Language in the Philosophy of the Ancient Greeks (2001), devoted to language in the philosophy of ancient Greece, and has contributed to the translation into Slovenian from Ancient Greek of a collection of fragments by the pre-Socratic philosophers. Fridl Jarc is also the author of Fragments of the Pre-Socratics (2012).

Between 2020 and 2022, Fridl Jarc served as State Secretary at the Ministry of Culture under Minister Vasko Simoniti. After leaving this office, she returned to Slovenska matica. She is member of the Slovenian Democratic Party and since 2025 she is the president of its Cultural Forum.

In May 2026 Fridl Jarc was announced as the Minister of Culture of the Janša new cabinet. She was sworn in on 4 June 2026.
