= Jernej Vrtovec =

Slovenian politician (born 1985)

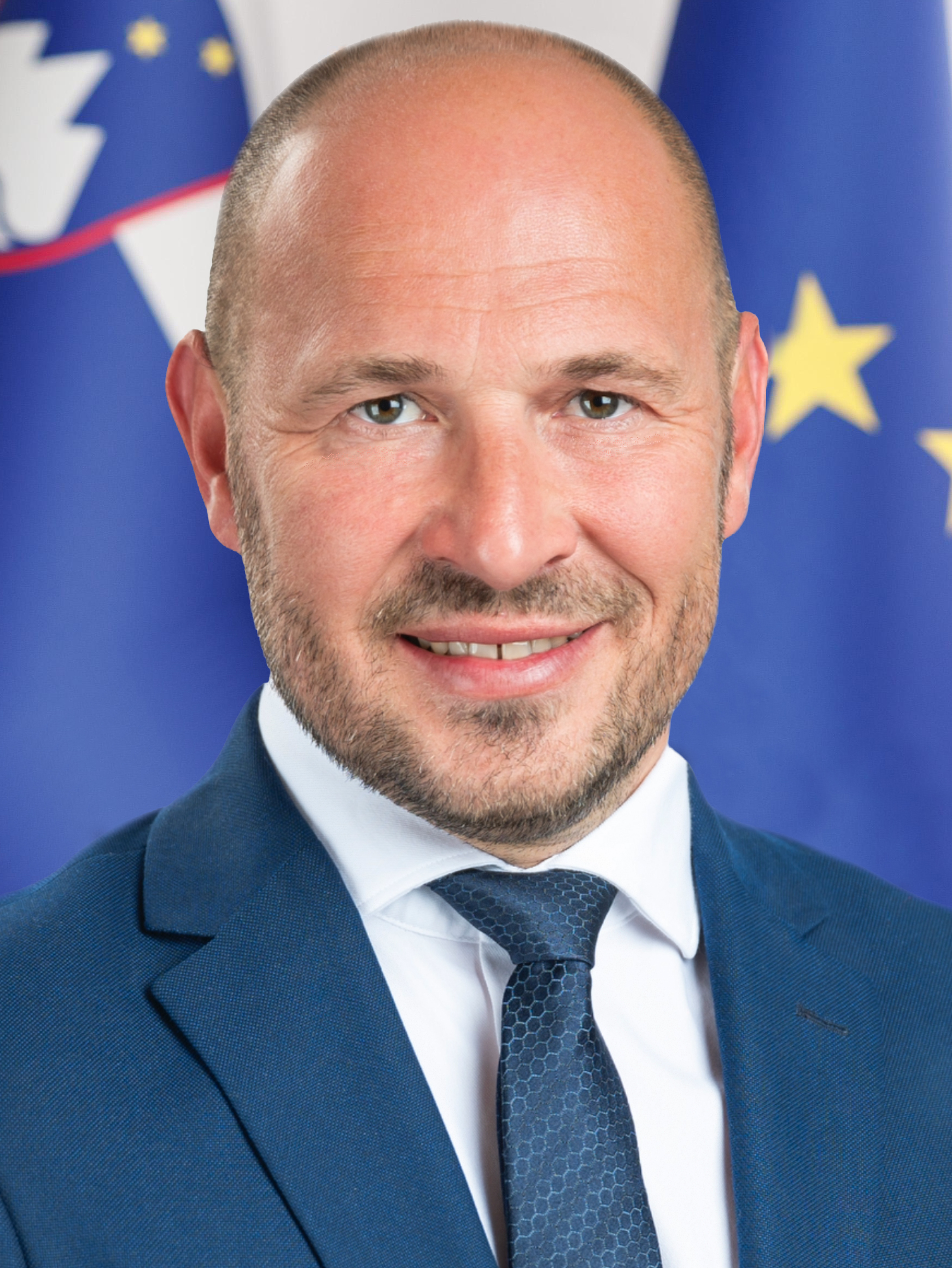
- Official portrait, 2026

Deputy Prime Minister and Minister of Infrastructure and Energy
- Incumbent
- Assumed office 4 June 2026
- Prime Minister: Janez Janša
- Preceded by: Alenka Bratušek (Infrastructure); Bojan Kumer (Environment, Climate and Energy)

Minister of Infrastructure
- In office 13 March 2020 – 1 June 2022
- Prime Minister: Janez Janša
- Preceded by: Alenka Bratušek
- Succeeded by: Bojan Kumer

Member of the National Assembly
- Incumbent
- Assumed office 13 May 2022

Personal details
- Born: 24 May 1985 (age 41)
- Party: New Slovenia
- Education: University of Ljubljana
- Profession: Theology

Jernej Vrtovec (born 24 May 1985) is a Slovenian theologian and politician. Currently a member of the National Assembly representing New Slovenia, he has served as the Minister for Infrastructure and Energy since June 2026. He was previously Minister of Infrastructure in the 14th Government of Slovenia from March 2020 to June 2022. In September 2025, Vrtovec was elected the president of the New Slovenia party.
