= Andrej Vizjak =

Slovenian politician (born 1964)

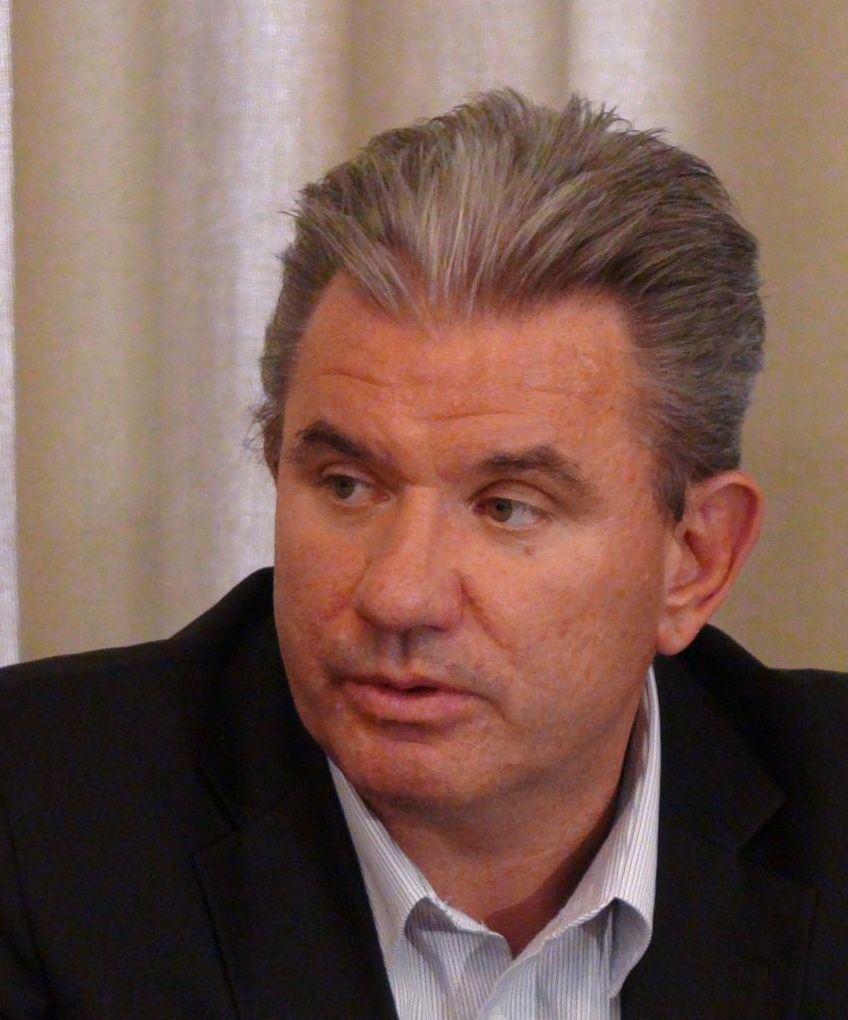
- Andrej Vizjak in 2012

Minister of the Environment and Spatial Planning
- In office 13 March 2020 – 1 June 2022
- Prime Minister: Janez Janša
- Preceded by: Simon Zajc
- Succeeded by: Uroš Brežan

Minister of Labour, Family and Social Affairs
- In office 10 February 2012 – 27 February 2013
- Prime Minister: Janez Janša
- Preceded by: Ivan Svetlik
- Succeeded by: Anja Kopač Mrak

Minister of the Economy
- In office 3 December 2004 – 7 November 2008
- Prime Minister: Janez Janša
- Preceded by: Matej Lahovnik
- Succeeded by: Matej Lahovnik

Mayor of Brežice
- In office 17 December 2002 – 3 December 2004
- Preceded by: Vladislav Deržič
- Succeeded by: Ivan Molan

Personal details
- Born: 6 August 1964 (age 61)
- Party: Slovenian Democratic Party

Andrej Vizjak (born 6 August 1964) is a Slovenian politician. Between 2004 and 2008 he served as Minister of Economy in the 8th Government of Slovenia, and between 2012 and 2013 as Minister of Labour, Family and Social Affairs in the 10th Government of Slovenia. From 2020 to 2022 he was Minister of the Environment and Spatial Planning in the 14th Government of Slovenia.

== Early life and career ==
After completing high school in Brežice, Vizjak graduated from the Faculty of Electrical Engineering and Computer Science at the University of Ljubljana and obtained a master's degree in electrical engineering.

His first job was at the Litostroj factory in Ljubljana. As a young researcher, he worked at the Jožef Stefan Institute on research and development projects in the field of computer automation of industrial processes for the needs of the Videm Krško pulp and paper factory.

In 1994, he began working as a labor inspector at the RS Inspectorate of Labor in the Krško unit.

=== Political career ===
In 2000, Vizjak was the State Secretary for Employment at the Ministry of Labour, Family, and Social Affairs of the Republic of Slovenia. In the 2000 parliamentary elections, he was elected as a member of parliament and became the leader of the parliamentary group of the SDS. In 2002, he also participated in the local elections and was elected as the Mayor of Brežice Municipality. He served in this capacity until December 3, 2004, when he was appointed as the Minister of Economy in the 8th Government of Slovenia under the leadership of Janez Janša.

On April 3, 2007, he signed a declaration on the construction of a pan-European oil pipeline through the territory of the Republic of Slovenia.

He was re-elected as a member of parliament in the new parliamentary term, as well as in the 2011 parliamentary elections. On February 10, 2012, he was appointed as the Minister of Labour, Family, and Social Affairs in the 10th Government of Slovenia, and after the fall of the government, he returned to the parliamentary benches. He returned to politics in the spring of 2020 when he was appointed as the Minister of the Environment and Spatial Planning in the 14th Government of the Republic of Slovenia.

His tenure as the head of the environmental ministry was marked by an amendment to the water law, which, among other things, addressed interventions in the coastal area. Non-governmental organizations filed a referendum initiative against the amendment. Referendum on Amendments to the Water Law took place on July 11, 2021, and was attended by 45.89% of eligible voters. 86.60% of voters voted against the law.

In October 2021, an excerpt of wiretapped conversation between Minister Vizjak and businessman Bojan Petan from 2004, when Vizjak was the Minister of Economy, was published on the portal 24ur.com. In the conversation, later dubbed as "The Stupid Taxes Affair", Vizjak and Petan discussed the takeover of Terme Čatež, with Vizjak telling the interlocutor that paying taxes would be "stupid". Initially, the minister claimed that the recording was manipulated, but after additional wiretaps were released, he confirmed that the recordings are authentic. Vizjak and some of his supporters labeled the affair as an attack by the "garbage lobby" trying to prevent the regulation of waste issues. The coalition parties SMC and NSi demanded explanations from Vizjak, and after internal consultations, the latter withdrew support for the minister.
