= Aleksander Jevšek =

Slovenian politician

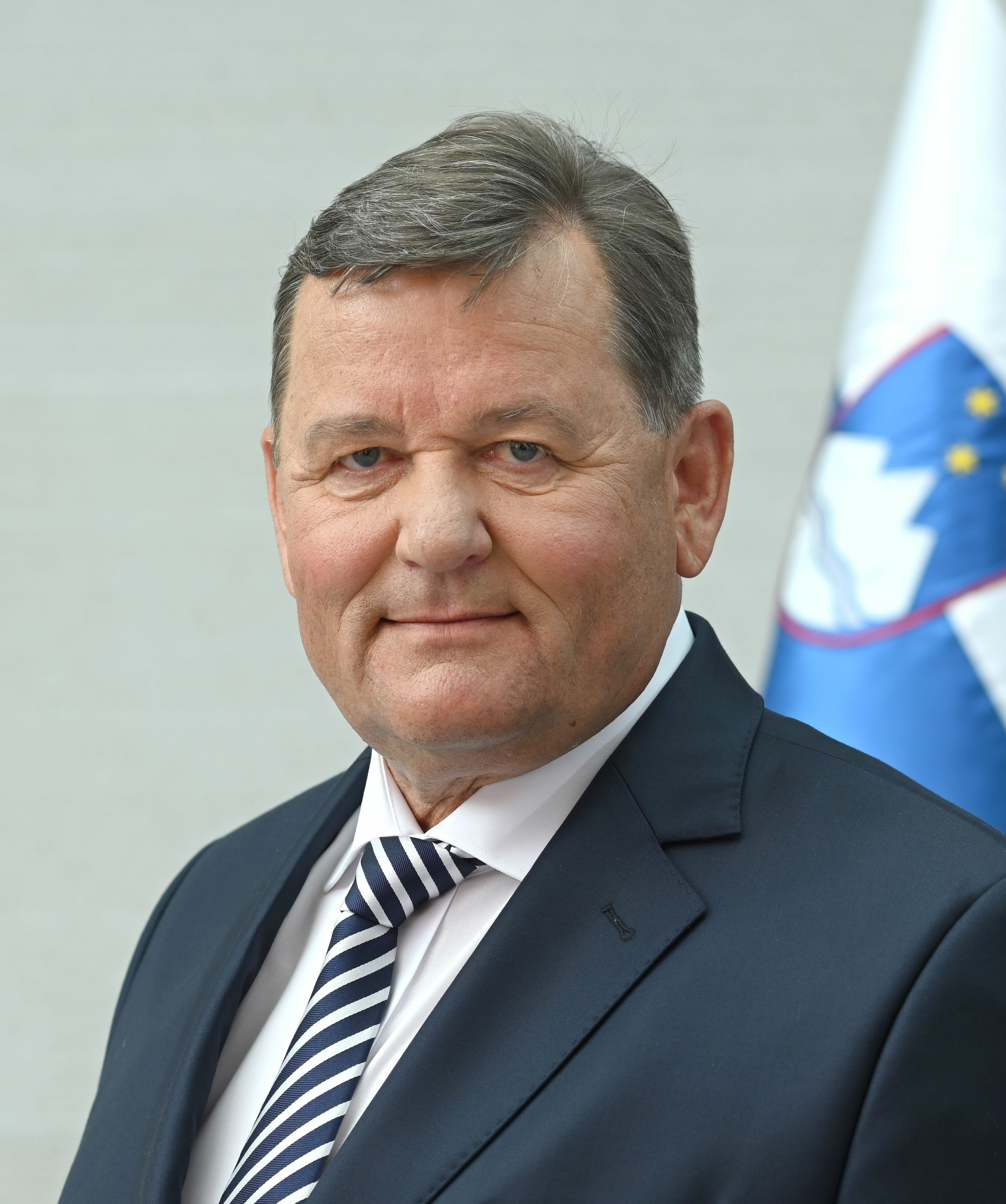
- Official portrait, 2022

Minister of Development, Strategic Projects and Cohesion
- In office 1 June 2022 – 4 June 2026
- Preceded by: Zvone Černač
- Succeeded by: Monika Kirbiš Rojs

Mayor of Murska Sobota
- In office 2014–2022
- Preceded by: Anton Štihec
- Succeeded by: Zoran Hoblaj

Personal details
- Born: Aleksander Jevšek; 21 July 1961 (age 65)
- Party: SD
- Occupation: politician, policeman, lawyer

Aleksander Jevšek (born 21 July 1961) is a Slovenian policeman, lawyer, politician and veteran of the Ten-Day War.

Jevšek was the head of the criminal police in the Police Administration of Celje (1997–99), the director of the Police Administration of Murska Sobota (1999-2006) and the director of the Police Administration of Ljubljana (2006). On 1 February 2007 he became the director of the Criminal Police Administration of the General Police Administration of Slovenia. He retired in January 2011.

He is the president of the Association of Criminalists of Slovenia. In the 2011 National Assembly elections, he ran on the LDS ticket. In the 2014 local elections, as a member of the Social Democrats, he was elected to the position of mayor of Murska Sobota Municipality, and again in 2018.

On 1 June 2022 he became Minister of Development, Strategic Projects and Cohesion in the government of Robert Golob. With this, his mayoral mandate ended, and he was temporarily succeeded by deputy mayor Zoran Hoblaj.
