= Uroš Brežan =

Slovenian politician

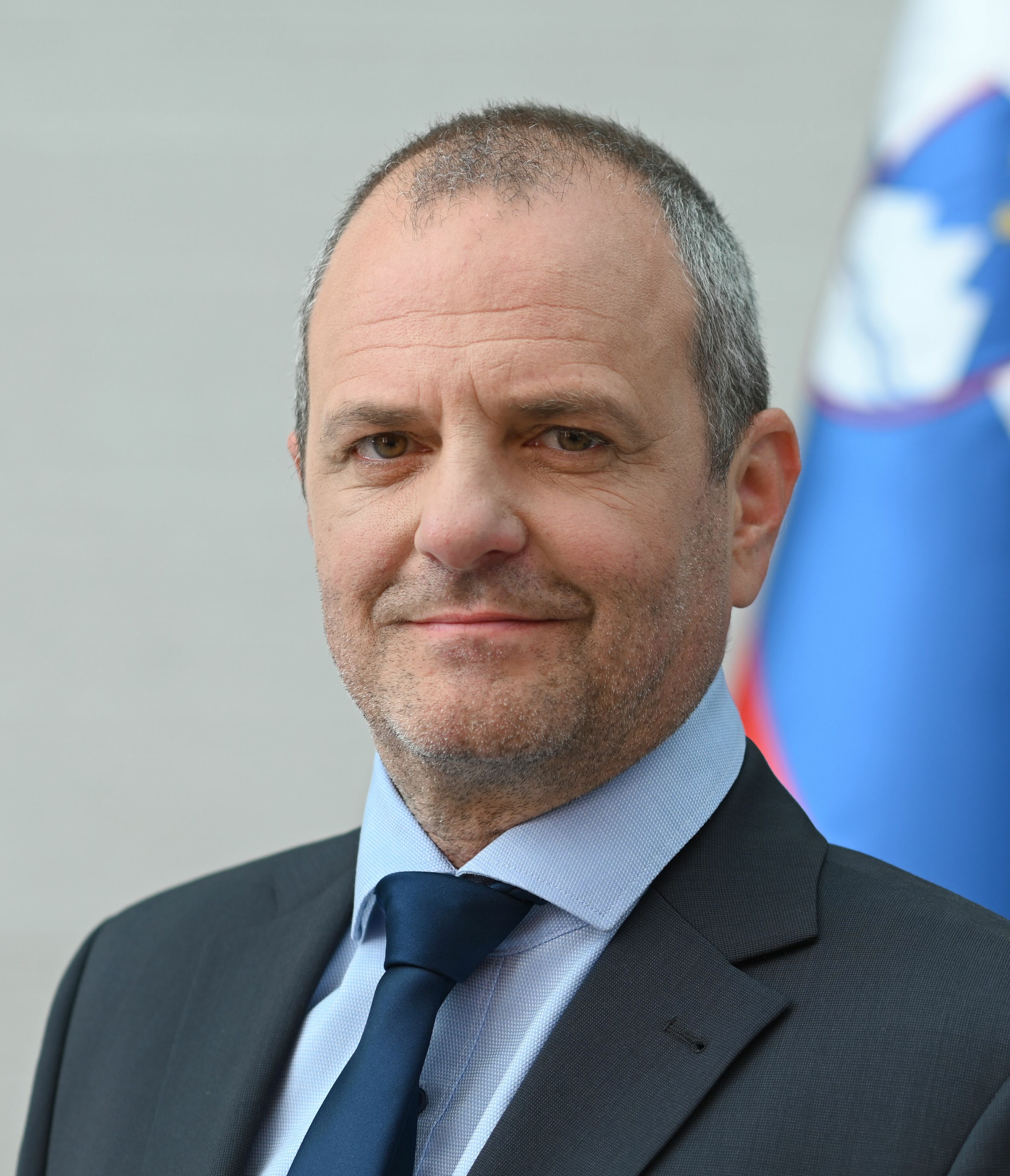
- Official portrait, 2022

Minister of Natural Resources and Spatial Planning
- In office 24 January 2023 – 9 October 2023
- Prime Minister: Robert Golob
- Preceded by: Himself (Environment and Spatial Planning)
- Succeeded by: Alenka Bratušek (acting)

Minister of the Environment and Spatial Planning
- In office 1 June 2022 – 24 January 2023
- Prime Minister: Robert Golob
- Preceded by: Andrej Vizjak
- Succeeded by: Bojan Kumer (Environment, Climate and Energy); Himself (National Resources and Spatial Planning)

Mayor of Tolmin
- In office November 2006 – 2 June 2022
- Preceded by: Jožef Ernest Kemperle
- Succeeded by: Maša Klavora

Member of the Slovenian National Council
- In office 2012–2017

Personal details
- Born: Uroš Brežan; 12 April 1972 (age 54)
- Party: Freedom Movement
- Occupation: politician, economist

Uroš Brežan (born 12 April 1972) is a Slovenian economist and politician. He served as the minister of environment and space of the Republic of Slovenia from 2022 to January 2023 and as the minister of natural resources and space from January 2023 to October 2023. On 29 January 2026, he was elected the director of the Triglav National Park Public Institution for the term of four years.

== Education ==
In 1991, Brežan graduated from the Tolmin High School and continued his education at the Faculty of Economics in Ljubljana. In 2001, he graduated from the aforementioned faculty with the thesis The Meaning of Marketing Posočje as a Tourist Destination.

== Career ==
Even before graduating, Brežan was employed as the head of the information office in the Student Organization of Ljubljana. In 2001, he then got a job at the company M Servis, where he worked until 2004. A year after that, he got a job at the Poso development center where he worked as a project manager.

=== Mayor of Tolmin municipality ===
In 2006, he ran for mayor of Tolmin municipality for the first time and was elected to the position with 68% of all votes. In 2010, he ran again and voters again expressed their support for him with 70% of the vote. He was elected twice more, in 2014 and lastly in 2018. On 2 June 2022, he handed over his duties to the deputy mayor, Maša Klavora, due to his new position.

=== Minister of Environment and Space ===
From 1 June 2022 to January 2023, in the 15th Slovenian government under the leadership of Robert Golob, he held the position of minister of environment and space. At the hearing, which he successfully passed on 31 May 2022, he highlighted the responsible use of natural resources and the establishment of dialogue. From January 2023, he held the position of the minister of natural resources and space, but stepped down in October 2023 due to the Prime Minister's dissatisfaction with his work.
