= Andrej Hoivik =

Slovenian politician (born 1993)

Member of the National Assembly
- In office 13 May 2022 – 10 April 2026
- Constituency: Kranj – Škofja Loka 1

Personal details
- Born: 13 January 1993 (age 33)
- Party: Slovenian Democratic Party

Andrej Hoivik (born 13 January 1993) is a Slovenian politician who served as a member of the National Assembly from 2022 to 2026. From 2021 to 2022, he served as undersecretary of the Ministry of Digital Transformation.
