= Darko Krajnc =

Slovenian politician (born 1975)

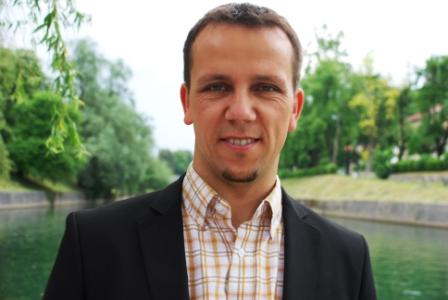
- Krajnc in 2009

Member of the National Assembly
- Incumbent
- Assumed office 13 May 2022
- Constituency: Ptuj – Pesnica

Personal details
- Born: 9 May 1975 (age 50)
- Party: Freedom Movement (since 2022)

Darko Krajnc (born 9 May 1975) is a Slovenian politician serving as a member of the National Assembly since 2022. From 2004 to 2012, he served as chairman of the Youth Party – European Greens.
