= 2007 Slovenian privatisation referendum =

11 November 2007
- Are you in favor of the Act on Amendments and Supplements to the Act on Ownership Transformation of Insurance Companies (ZLPZ-1A), which was adopted by the National Assembly of the Republic of Slovenia at its session on 11 September 2007?

Results
Choice	Votes	%
Yes	273,736	28.88%
No	674,132	71.12%
Valid votes	947,868	95.16%
Invalid or blank votes	48,215	4.84%
Total votes	996,083	100.00%
Registered voters/turnout	1,720,152	57.91%

A referendum on further privatisation of Zavarovalnica Triglav was held in Slovenia on 11 November 2007. The referendum would approve the Amending the Ownership Transformation of Insurance Companies Act, which would allow Kapitalska družba to sell its shares in Zavarovalnica Triglav. The proposal was rejected by 71.1% of voters.

== Results ==
Choice	Votes	%
For	273,736	28.9
Against	674,132	71.1
Invalid/blank votes	48,215	–
Total	996,083	100
Registered voters/turnout	1,720,152	57.9
Source: Nohlen & Stöver
