= Anže Logar =

Slovenian politician (born 1976)

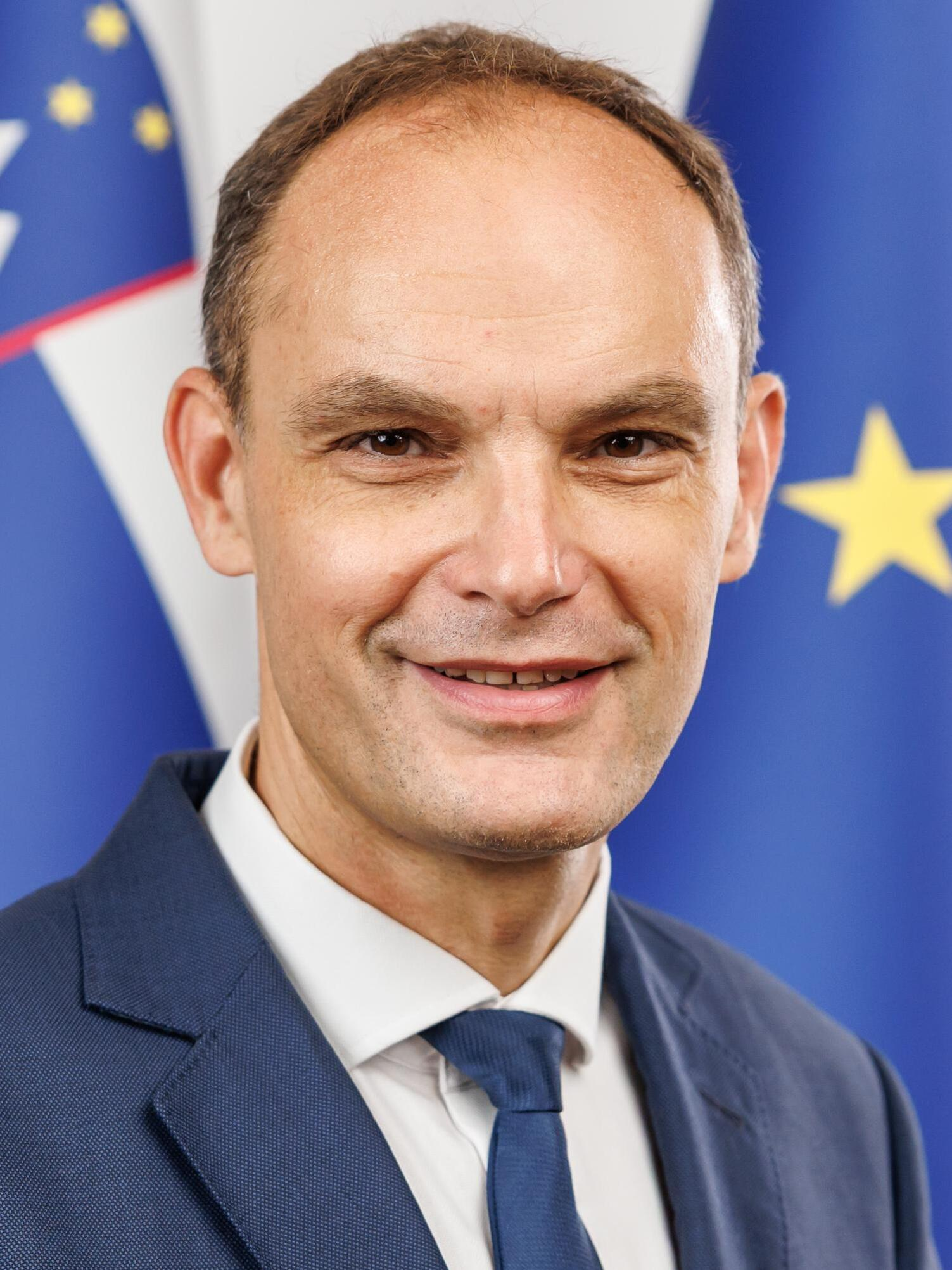
- Official portrait, 2026

Deputy Prime Minister and Minister of Economy, Labour, and Sport
- Incumbent
- Assumed office 4 June 2026
- Prime Minister: Janez Janša
- Preceded by: Matjaž Han (as Minister of Economy, Tourism, and Sport); Luka Mesec (as Minister of Labour, Family, Social Affairs, and Equal Opportunities)

Member of the National Assembly
- In office 13 July 2014 – 10 April 2026

Minister of Foreign Affairs
- In office 13 March 2020 – 1 June 2022
- Prime Minister: Janez Janša
- Preceded by: Miro Cerar
- Succeeded by: Tanja Fajon

Personal details
- Born: 15 May 1976 (age 50) Ljubljana, SR Slovenia, SFR Yugoslavia
- Party: Democrats (since 2024)
- Other political affiliations: Slovenian Democratic Party (1999–2024)

Anže Logar (born 15 May 1976) is a Slovenian politician who was Minister of Foreign Affairs in the third Janša cabinet from March 2020 to June 2022.

Logar served as the director of the Government Communication Office in both Governments of Janez Janša, and served as the official spokesperson of the Slovenian Presidency of the Council of the European Union in 2008. He ran in the presidential elections of October and November 2022, but narrowly lost to Nataša Pirc Musar.

== Education and early life ==
In 2000, Logar graduated at the Faculty of Economics in Ljubljana. In January 2006, he obtained his MSc degree at The Graduate School of Government and European Studies. In July 2016 Logar received a doctorate from the Faculty of Applied Social Studies in Nova Gorica.

Logar started working in 2000 in the marketing division of SKB Bank, Société Générale group. In view of Slovenia's EU accession, in 2003 he moved to Brussels to work as adviser as the new Slovenian Members of the European Parliament from the European People's Party group (SDS).

== Political career ==
He then joined Janez Janša's cabinet as head of public relations of the government office for European affairs (2006–07) and director of the government's communication office UKOM (2007–08); during this period he was also the official spokesperson of the Slovenian Presidency of the Council of the European Union in 2008. As Janša was replaced in government by Borut Pahor, Logar remained as officer in UKOM. He was re-appointed director with the second Janša cabinet in 2012. The following year, Logar was appointed Minister Plenipotentiary at the Directorate for Economic Diplomacy of the Slovenian Ministry of Foreign Affairs.

In the 2014 parliamentary elections, Logar was elected to the Slovenian National Assembly on the list of the Slovenian Democratic Party (SDS). He chaired the Committee of Inquiry into identifying abuses in the Slovenian banking system and determining the causes and responsibilities for the second overhaul of the banking system in independent Slovenia. He was a member of the parliamentary friendship groups with Israel, France, and the United States. He was re-elected in 2018.

In early 2020, Logar was appointed minister of foreign affairs of Slovenia in the third Janša cabinet. At the parliamentary hearing he mentioned as priority the expansion of the diplomatic network, better cooperation with the Ministry of Defense, and strengthening relations with neighboring Croatia including the implementation of the arbitral award on the Piran Bay dispute. He was endorsed by the committee with 13 votes in favour and 7 against.

He was criticised in April 2020 for forwarding to the Council of Europe a letter claiming that most media outlets in Slovenia stemmed from the communist regime. In November 2022, Logar conceded defeat to Nataša Pirc Musar in the presidential elections and congratulated her for her victory.

== Honours ==
On 16 February 2007, on the occasion of Independence Day, the Lithuanian President Valdas Adamkus conferred upon him a state award – the Life Saving Cross for his merits in saving the life of a citizen of Lithuania from drowning in a Hungarian lake.

On October 14, 2022, Italian President Sergio Mattarella announced that he would award Logar the highest recognition of the Italian state, namely the Knight of the Grand Cross decoration for his merits in promoting and deepening bilateral relations between Italy and Slovenia.
