= 15th Government of Slovenia =

National government formed 1 June 2022

Golob Cabinet
- 15th Cabinet of Slovenia

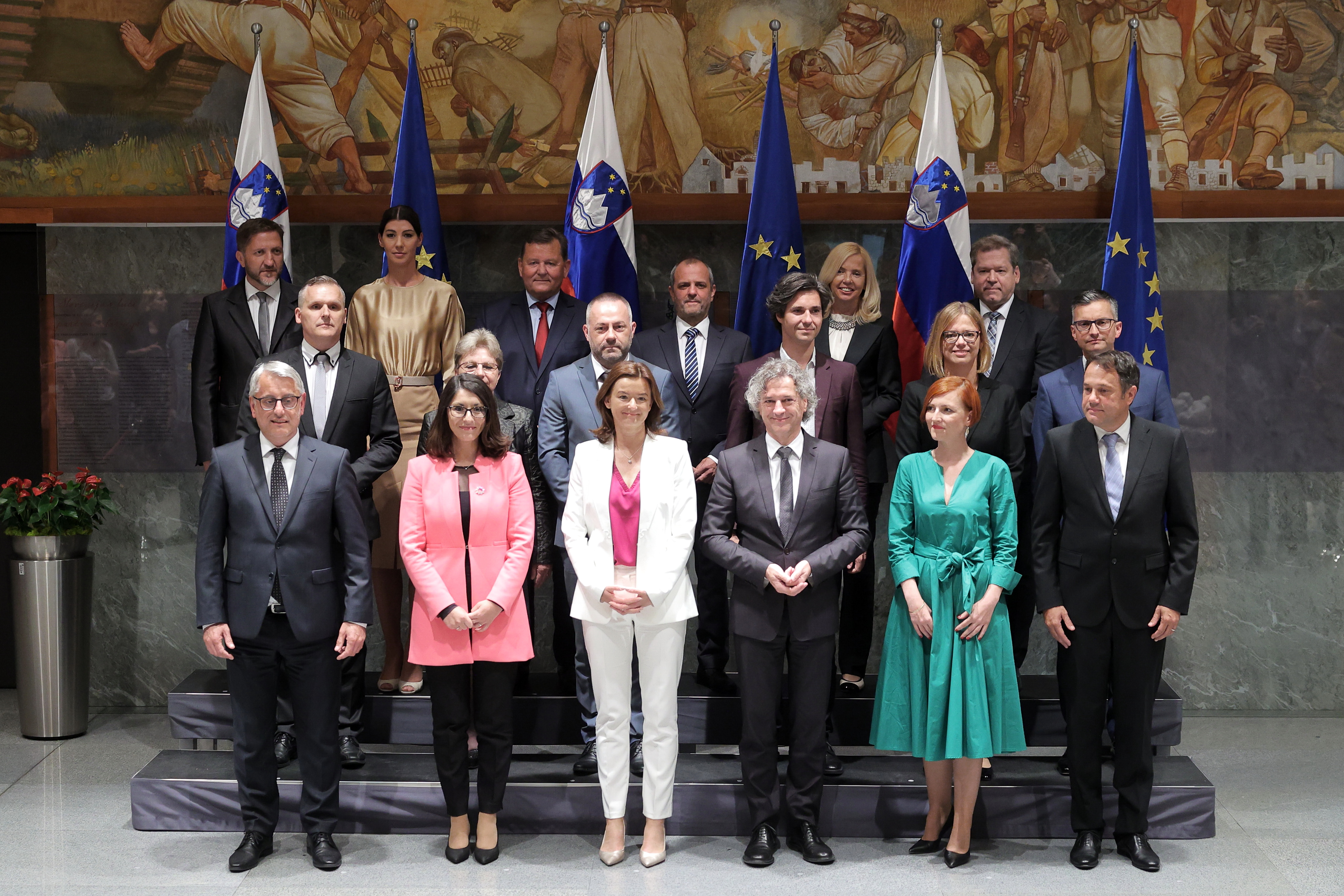
- Date formed: 1 June 2022
- Date dissolved: 4 June 2026

People and organisations
- Head of state: Borut Pahor; Nataša Pirc Musar
- Head of government: Robert Golob (GS)
- Deputy head of government: Klemen Boštjančič (GS); Tanja Fajon (SD); Luka Mesec (The Left)
- No. of ministers: PM + 20 ministers
- Total no. of members: 21
- Member party: GS; SD; The Left
- Status in legislature: Centre-left majority government (coalition)
- Opposition cabinet: None
- Opposition party: SDS; NSi; SLS (since 10 April 2026); Fokus (since 10 April 2026); Democrats (since 10 April 2026); Resni.ca (since 10 April 2026)
- Opposition leader: Not an official position Janez Janša (SDS); Jernej Vrtovec (NSi); Anže Logar (Democrats); Zoran Stevanović (Resni.ca)

History
- Election: 2022 election
- Legislature terms: 9th National Assembly; 10th National Assembly (caretaker)
- Predecessor: Janša III
- Successor: Janša IV

The 15th Government of Slovenia (also known as the Golob Cabinet) was formed by Robert Golob following the 2022 Slovenian parliamentary election. Robert Golob, leader of the Freedom Movement, was nominated as Prime Minister, and was approved as such on 25 May. The government had the largest number of ministries after the 1st Government of Slovenia.

== Composition ==
=== Cabinet ===
Here is the actual composition of the cabinet according to the official page:

Portfolio	Party	Minister	Took office	Left office
Prime Minister	GS	Robert Golob	1 June 2022	4 June 2026
Deputy Prime Minister(s)
Minister of Foreign and European Affairs	SD	Tanja Fajon	1 June 2022	4 June 2026
Minister of Labor, Family, Social Affairs and Equal Opportunities	Left	Luka Mesec	1 June 2022	4 June 2026
Minister of Finance	GS	Klemen Boštjančič	1 June 2022	4 June 2026
Minister without portfolio, responsible for relations between the Republic of Slovenia and the autochthonous Slovene national community in neighboring countries and between the Republic of Slovenia and Slovenes around the world	GS	Matej Arčon	1 June 2022	4 June 2026
Ministers
Minister of the Interior	GS	Tatjana Bobnar	1 June 2022	14 December 2022
Minister of the Interior	GS	Boštjan Poklukar	21 February 2023	3 November 2025
Minister of the Interior	GS	Branko Zlobko	21 November 2025	4 June 2026
Minister of Defence	GS	Marjan Šarec	1 June 2022	16 July 2024
Minister of Defence	GS	Robert Golob (acting)	16 July 2024	7 October 2024
Minister of Defence	GS	Borut Sajovic	7 October 2024	4 June 2026
Minister of Finance	GS	Klemen Boštjančič	1 June 2022	4 June 2026
Minister of the Economy, Tourism and Sport	SD	Matjaž Han	1 June 2022	4 June 2026
Minister of Justice	SD	Dominika Švarc Pipan	1 June 2022	5 March 2024
Minister of Justice	SD	Andreja Katič	5 March 2024	3 November 2025
Minister of Justice	SD	Andreja Kokalj	21 November 2025	4 June 2026
Minister of Public Administration	GS	Sanja Ajanovič Hovnik	1 June 2022	9 October 2023
Minister of Public Administration	GS	Klemen Boštjančič (acting)	9 October 2023	7 December 2023
Minister of Public Administration	GS	Franc Props	7 December 2023	4 June 2026
Minister of Education, Science and Sport	GS	Igor Papič	1 June 2022	9 January 2023
Minister of Higher Education, Science and Innovation	GS	Igor Papič	24 January 2023	4 June 2026
Minister of Health	GS	Danijel Bešič Loredan	1 June 2022	7 June 2023
Minister of Health	GS	Robert Golob (acting)	13 July 2023	13 October 2023
Minister of Health	GS	Valentina Prevolnik Rupel	13 October 2023	4 June 2026
Minister of Education	GS	Darjo Felda	24 January 2023	7 October 2024
Minister of Education	GS	Vinko Logaj	7 October 2024	4 June 2026
Minister of Infrastructure	GS	Bojan Kumer	1 June 2022	9 January 2023
Minister of Infrastructure	GS	Alenka Bratušek	24 January 2023	4 June 2026
Minister of Culture	Left	Asta Vrečko	1 June 2022	4 June 2026
Minister of Agriculture, Forestry and Food	GS	Irena Šinko	1 June 2022	13 October 2023
Minister of Agriculture, Forestry and Food	GS	Marjan Šarec (acting)	13 October 2023	12 January 2024
Minister of Agriculture, Forestry and Food	GS	Mateja Čalušić	12 January 2024	4 June 2026
Minister of Natural Resources and Spatial Planning	GS	Uroš Brežan	1 June 2022	9 October 2023
Minister of Natural Resources and Spatial Planning	GS	Alenka Bratušek (acting)	9 October 2023	7 December 2023
Minister of Natural Resources and Spatial Planning	GS	Jože Novak	7 December 2023	4 June 2026
Minister of Solidarity-Based Future	Left	Simon Maljevac	24 January 2023	4 June 2026
Minister of the Environment, Climate and Energy	GS	Bojan Kumer	24 January 2023	4 June 2026
Minister of Digital Transformation	GS	Emilija Stojmenova Duh	24 January 2023	17 December 2024
Minister of Digital Transformation	GS	Ksenija Klampfer	17 December 2024	4 June 2026
Minister of Cohesion and Regional Development	SD	Aleksander Jevšek	24 January 2023	4 June 2026
Ministers without portfolio
Minister without portfolio, responsible for relations between the Republic of Slovenia and the autochthonous Slovene national community in neighboring countries and between the Republic of Slovenia and Slovenes around the world	GS	Matej Arčon	1 June 2022	4 June 2026

=== Coalition ===
Party		No. of MPs	No. of ministers	Female ministers
GS	Freedom Movement; Gibanje Svoboda	40	13 + PM	4
SD	Social Democrats; Socialni demokrati	7	4	2
Left	The Left; Levica	5	3	1
Total		52	20 + PM	7 (35 %)

== Formation and election ==
=== Candidate for prime minister ===
President Borut Pahor nominated Robert Golob, leader of the Freedom Movement, to be the next prime minister after consultations with political groups' leaders in the National Assembly.

==== Election of the prime minister ====
Date	Candidate	In favour	Against	Invalid
May 25, 2022	Robert Golob	54	30	1

=== Election of the government ===
The National Assembly confirmed the cabinet ministers on 1 June 2022.

Date	In favour	Against	Abstain
1 June 2022	53	28	2

== Portfolio changes ==
The following portfolios were changed in the Golob cabinet:

- the new Ministry of the Environment, Climate and Energy is responsible for the environment, waste management, and climate change (previously under the Ministry of the Environment and Spatial Planning), and public transport, transport policy, sustainable mobility, energy, and renewable sources (previously within the Ministry of Infrastructure);
- the new Ministry of Digital Transformation, previously Office of the Government for Digital Transformation, has been transformed into a ministry, which is also responsible for information technology in public administration (previously within the Ministry of Public Administration);
- the new Ministry of Higher Education, Science and Innovation is responsible for higher education, science, and research (previously under the Ministry of Education, Science and Sport), and technology development and innovation (previously within the Ministry of Economic Development and Technology);
- the new Ministry of Solidary Future is responsible for long-term care (previously under the Ministry of Health), housing policy (previously under the Ministry of the Environment and Spatial Planning), and economic democracy (previously within the Ministry of Economic Development and Technology);
- the new Ministry of Regional Development and Cohesion (previously the Government Office for Development and Cohesion) has been transformed into a ministry that is also responsible for regional development (previously under the Ministry of Economic Development and Technology);
- the Ministry of the Environment and Spatial Planning has been renamed the Ministry of Natural Resources and Spatial Planning, now only responsible for nature, waters, nuclear safety and spatial planning, and mining (previously under the Ministry of Infrastructure);
- the Ministry of Economic Development and Technology has been renamed the Ministry of Economy, Tourism and Sport and is now also responsible for sport (previously under the Ministry of Education, Science and Sport), but is no longer responsible for technology and innovation;
- the Ministry of Education, Science and Sport has been renamed the Ministry of Education, now only responsible for primary and secondary education, adult education, and youth;
- the Ministry of Infrastructure is now only responsible for road and other infrastructure;
- the Ministry of Health is no longer responsible for long-term care;
- the Ministry of Public Administration is no longer responsible for information technology in public administration; and
- the Ministry of Foreign Affairs has been renamed the Ministry of Foreign and European Affairs, with no changes in responsibilities.

No changes are planned for the Ministry of the Interior, Ministry of Justice, Ministry of Finance, Ministry of Defense, Ministry of Agriculture, Forestry and Food, Ministry of Labor, Family, Social Affairs and Equal Opportunities, Ministry of Culture and the Government Office for the Slovenians Abroad.

== Policy ==
=== Animal welfare ===
The government introduced measures in January 2025 to ban the confinement of egg-laying hens in battery cages by 2029 and prohibit the castration of piglets without anesthetic by 2026. The National Assembly endorsed the measures in July 2025, overriding the veto of the National Council.

=== Foreign policy ===
In July 2025, the government announced an arms embargo against Israel and designated Israeli National Security Minister Itamar Ben Gvir and Finance Minister Bezalel Smotrich "persona non grata" over their role in human rights violations against Palestinians. This made Slovenia the first state in the European Union to bar Israel officials or impose an arms embargo over the Gaza war.

In September 2025, the government formally banned Israeli prime minister Benjamin Netanyahu from entering the country, linking the ban to the International Criminal Court arrest warrant out for Netanyahu.
