= Andreja Kokalj =

Slovenian politician (born 1979)

Minister of Justice of Slovenia
- In office 21 November 2025 – 4 June 2026
- Prime Minister: Robert Golob
- Preceded by: Andreja Katič

Personal details
- Born: 1979 (age 46–47)
- Party: Social Democrats

Andreja Kokalj (born 1979) is a Slovenian politician, lawyer and judge.

In 2004 she graduated from the Faculty of Law, University of Ljubljana with the thesis Lawsuit out of Love and the Nature of Legal Argumentation COBISS 6811985. In 2016 she obtained a master's degree from the Faculty of Law with the thesis The Nature of Law Through the Lens of Feminist Legal Theory COBISS 1913422. The same year she also obtained a master's degree in defence studies from the Faculty of Social Sciences, University of Ljubljana with the thesis Political, Legal and Security Dimensions of the Establishment of the Kosovo Armed Forces COBISS 34880605.

In 2017 she became an inspector. She was a member of the Commission for the Prevention of Corruption and also served as a lay judge at the Labour and Social Court in Ljubljana. On 14 March 2024 she became State Secretary at the Ministry of Justice.

On 6 November 2025 she was proposed by the Social Democrats as the new Minister of Justice following the resignation of the previous minister Andreja Katič due to the death of Aleš Šutar. The parliamentary committee for justice confirmed the suitability of her candidacy on 17 November, and on 21 November she was sworn in as minister at a plenary session of the National Assembly.
