= Emilija Stojmenova Duh =

Slovenian politician (born 1985)

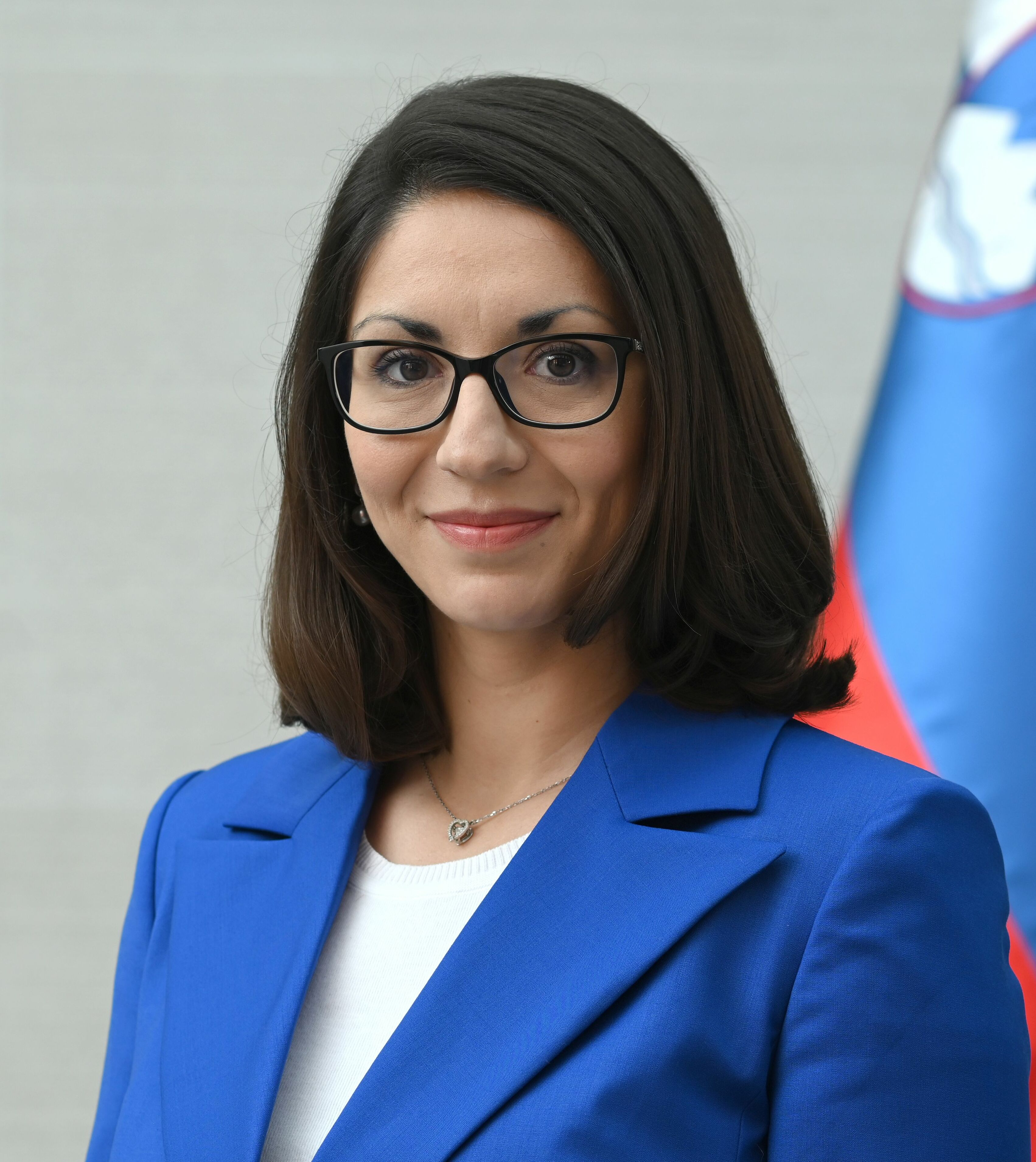
- Stojmenova Duh in 2022

Minister for Digital Transformation
- Incumbent
- Assumed office 1 June 2022
- Preceded by: Mark Boris Andrijanič

Member of the Strategic Council for Digitization
- In office 10 April 2021 – 7 June 2022

Personal details
- Born: Emilija Stojmenova Duh; 25 December 1985 (age 40) Vinica, SR Macedonia, SFR Yugoslavia
- Occupation: politician, electrical engineer, scientist

Emilija Stojmenova Duh (born 25 December 1985) is a Macedonian-Slovenian electrical engineer and politician. She was minister for digital transformation of the Republic of Slovenia from 1 June 2022 until 26 September 2024.

== Youth and education ==
She was born in Vinica, North Macedonia, and moved to Maribor, Slovenia in 2002, when she received a scholarship from the Ad Futura agency for schooling as part of the International Baccalaureate, which was implemented by the II. Maribor high school. She completed her studies at the Faculty of Electrical Engineering, Computer Science and Informatics. She completed her doctoral studies in 2013.

== Career ==
After graduation, she started working as a young researcher at Iskratel. After completing her doctoral studies, she got a job in the Faculty of Electrical Engineering at Ljubljana, where she is currently an associate professor in the Department of Information and Communication Technologies. There, she also led the digital junction 4PDIH, a partnership between the Faculty of Electrical Engineering and the Community of Municipalities of Slovenia, which raises awareness of the importance of digitization.

Between 2014 and 2016, she was the head of Demol Slovenia, part of the Demol international network. From February 2018 to October 2019, she was the executive director of the Digital Innovation Junction of Slovenia. She was a member of the board of directors of the Public Research Agency of the Republic of Slovenia, and is currently a member of the expert council of the Employment Agency of the Republic of Slovenia.

She was a finalist in the Engineer of the Year 2018 selection and nominated for Slovene Woman of the Year 2021.

== Politics ==
=== Digitalization Strategy Council ===
On 10 April 2021 she was appointed as a member of the Prime Minister's new consultative body, namely the Strategic Council for Digitization, headed by Mark Boris Andrijanič. She later resigned from the council on 7 June 2021, citing wasted opportunities to finance development projects.

=== Candidacy in the 2022 National Assembly elections ===
Stojmenova Duh also ran in 2022 National Assembly elections, she appeared on the list of Social Democrats, namely in Maribor in the 7th electoral unit. She switched to the Freedom Movement in September 2022.

=== Minister for Digital Transformation ===
From 1 June 2022, in the 15th Slovenian government under the leadership of Robert Golob, she was the Minister for Digital Transformation, until she resigned from her position on September 26, 2024.
