= II Gymnasium =

II Gymnasium may refer to:

- II Gymnasium, Maribor
- II Gymnasium Osijek
- II Gymnasium Split
- II Gymnasium Zagreb
- Second Gymnasium, Sarajevo
