= Lilijana Kozlovič =

Slovenian politician

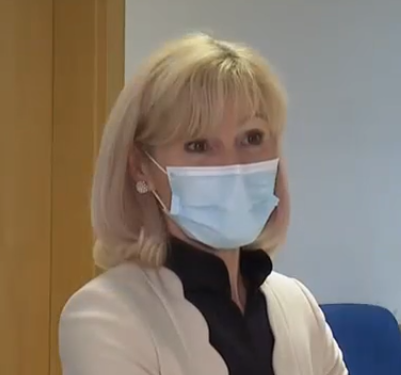

Minister of Justice
- In office 13 March 2020 – 27 May 2021
- Prime Minister: Janez Janša
- Preceded by: Andreja Katič
- Succeeded by: Marjan Dikaučič

Personal details
- Born: 30 October 1962 (age 63)
- Occupation: Politician

Lilijana Kozlovič (born 30 October 1962) is a Slovenian politician. She served as Minister of Justice in the 14th Government of Slovenia.

Political offices
Preceded by Andreja Katič	Minister of Justice; 2020–2021	Succeeded by Marjan Dikaučič
