= Šutar Act =

2025 Slovenian law

Emergency Measures to Ensure Public Safety Act

Slovenian Parliament
- Status: Current legislation

The Emergency Measures to Ensure Public Safety Act, commonly known as the Šutar Act, is a 2025 Slovenian law.

== Summary ==
The act amends several key statutes related to public safety, specifically it permits the entry and inspection of foreign residences without a court order and authorizes the use of technical surveillance in security, targeting security operations for the prevention and detection of serious public order offenses, major traffic violations, and specific criminal acts. It creates a legal framework authorizing automated license plate verification.

The act includes targeted public works opportunities for members of the Roma community.

== Background ==
The Government of Prime Minister Robert Golob approved the text of the Act and submitted it to the National Assembly for debate on 6 November 2025.

== Criticism ==
Amnesty International condemned the Act as "draconian" and said the law could result in further marginalization of the Roma. The European Commission reacted to the Act by urging Slovenia to ensure the law's enforcement doesn't "disproportionately affect any community".
