= Andrijanić =

Andrijanić or Andrijanič is a surname. Notable people with the surname include:

- Mark Boris Andrijanič (born 1983), Slovenian politician and lawyer
- Marcel Andrijanić (born 1992), German footballer
