= Sanja Ajanović Hovnik =

Slovenian politician (born 1977)

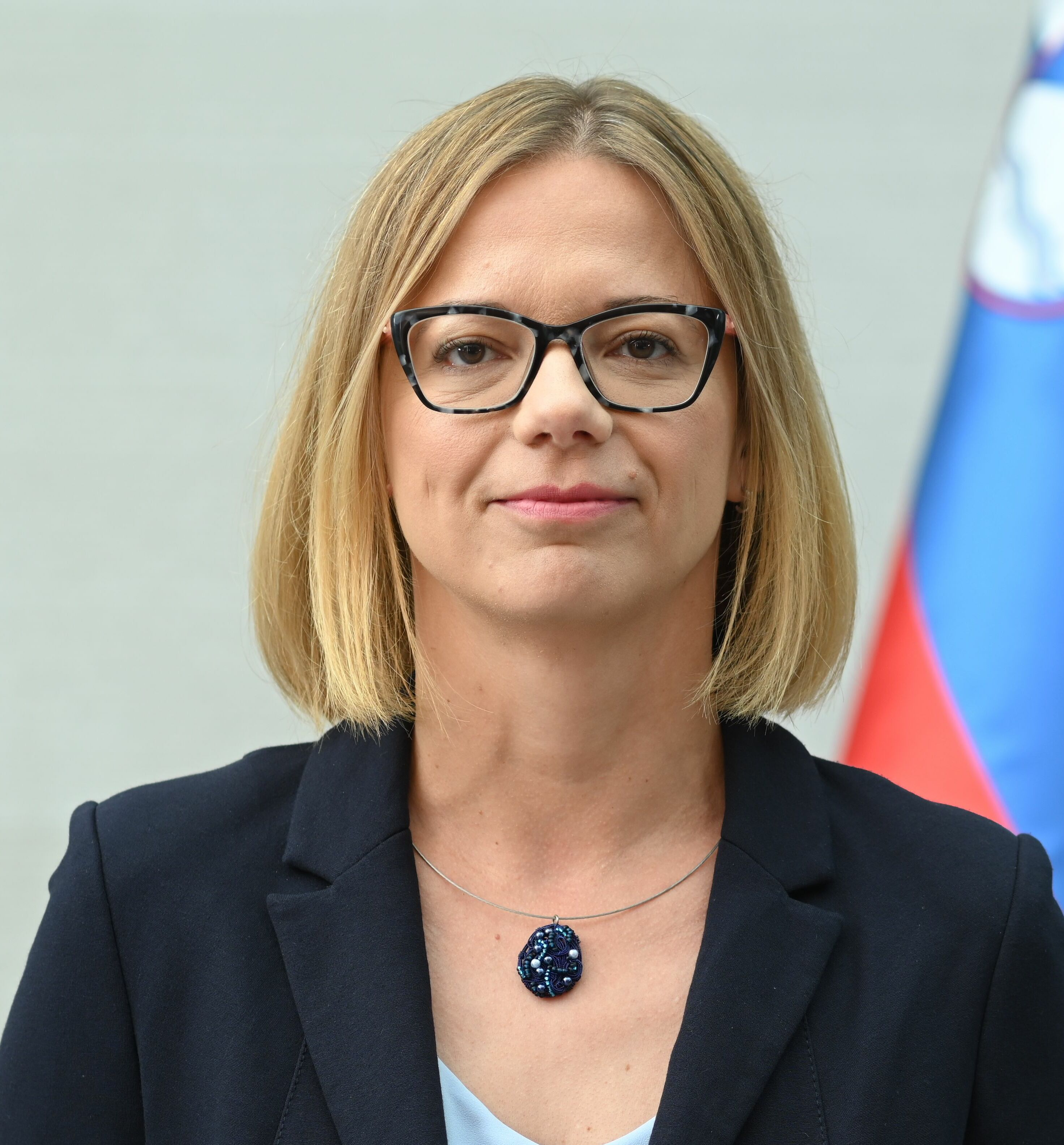
- Ajanović Hovnik in 2022

Minister of Public Administration
- In office 1 June 2022 – 9 October 2023
- Prime Minister: Robert Golob
- Succeeded by: Franc Props

Personal details
- Born: 14 July 1977 (age 48) Ljubljana, SR Slovenia, SFR Yugoslavia
- Party: Freedom Movement
- Occupation: Politician

Sanja Ajanović Hovnik (born 14 July 1977) is a Slovenian politician. She serves as the minister of public administration of the Republic of Slovenia in the government of Robert Golob since 2022.

== Early life and career ==
Hovnik was born on 14 July 1977, in Ljubljana, Slovenia. She attended the University of Ljubljana, where she graduated in work process optimization in state administration, and later also received her master's degree from the same institution in Business Administration. She is currently a PhD candidate in the field of economics of national policies.

== Career ==
She has been working as a civil servant since 2008. Between 2015 and 2018, she served as Secretary of Party of Alenka Bratušek parliamentary group in the National Assembly. In 2018, she became the Secretary of the Advocate of the Principle of Equality, and in 2019 the Deputy Director of the Development and European Cohesion Policy of Slovenia, where she was responsible for European Territorial Cooperation. Since May 2020, she has been employed by the Agency for Agricultural Markets and Rural Development. She is a member of the Freedom Movement, where she heads the party's program committee.

=== Minister of Public Administration ===
From 1 June 2022, she has been the minister of public administration in the 15th Government of Slovenia. At the hearing on 30 May, she highlighted as the first steps the appointment of a government negotiating team to overhaul the wage system and the start of negotiations with the unions.
