= Marjan Dikaučič =

Slovenian politician

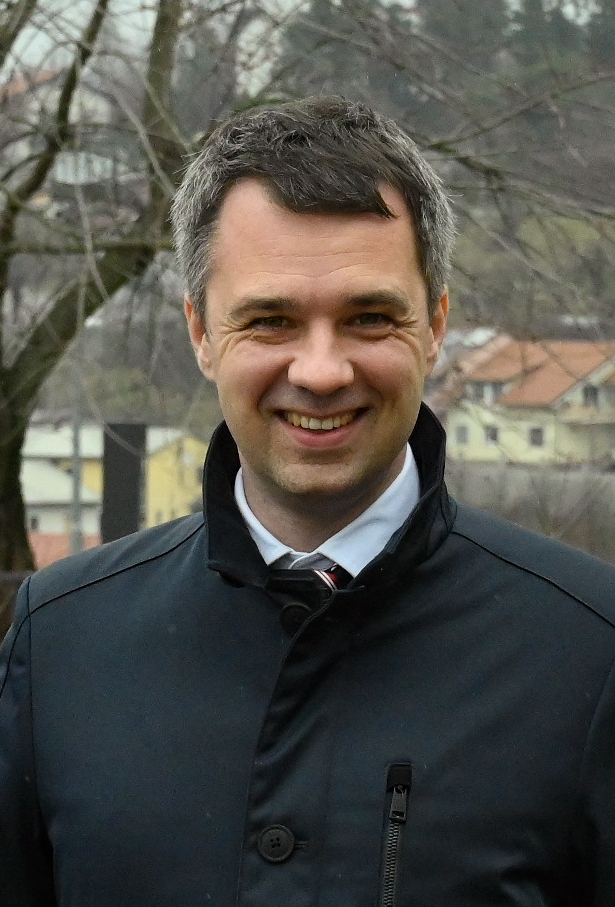

Minister of Justice
- In office 15 June 2021 – 1 June 2022
- Preceded by: Lilijana Kozlovič
- Succeeded by: Dominika Švarc Pipan

Marjan Dikaučič is a Slovenian politician. From June 15, 2021 to June 1, 2022 he served as minister of justice in the cabinet of Prime Minister Janez Janša.

== Biography ==
Dikaučič served as the minister of justice of Slovenia. As a lawyer, he graduated in 2006 and worked as a judicial intern at the Higher Court in Ljubljana. Three years later, he passed the bar exam. He also holds a professional exam for performing the function of a trustee in insolvency and compulsory liquidation proceedings. He worked in the private sector for several years, mainly in the economy. He lived in Slovenska Bistrica and later moved near Šentjur.

Following the resignation of Lilijana Kozlovič as the Minister of Justice in the 14th Government of Slovenia, the Modern Centre Party nominated Dikaučič as her replacement. He was heard by the competent judiciary committee on June 10, 2021, where he convinced seven members of the committee, with six against. He was confirmed by the National Assembly on June 15, 2021, with 44 votes in favor and 41 against.

Political offices
Preceded by Lilijana Kozlovič	Minister of Justice; 2021–2022	Succeeded by Dominika Švarc Pipan
