= Dominika Švarc Pipan =

Slovenian politician and lawyer

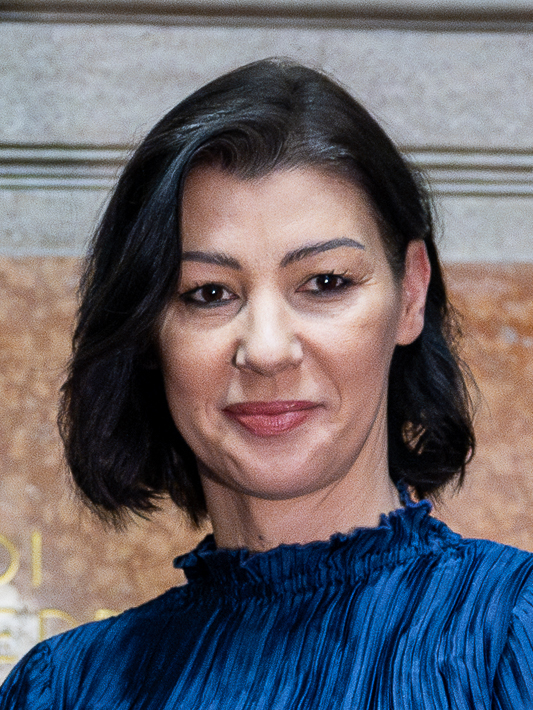
- Švarc Pipan in 2024

Minister of Justice
- In office 1 June 2022 – 16 February 2024
- Prime Minister: Robert Golob
- Preceded by: Marjan Dikaučič
- Succeeded by: Andreja Katič

Personal details
- Born: 9 July 1978 (age 47) Slovenj Gradec, SR Slovenia, SFR Yugoslavia
- Party: Social Democrats (2017–2024)

Dominika Švarc Pipan (born 9 July 1978) is a Slovenian politician and lawyer. She served as the minister of justice of Slovenia from June 2022 to February 2024.

== Early life and career ==
Dominika Švarc Pipan was born on 9 July 1978 in Slovenj Gradec, Slovenia. She grew up in Dravograd. She attended the Ravne na Koroškem Gymnasium and graduated in 1997. She then enrolled at the University of Ljubljana and studied Law. She graduated from the institution in 2003. She continued her education at the London School of Economics where she majored in Political Science and in 2011 received her PhD in political science. She was a volleyball coach in her youth.

During the 2018 Slovenian parliamentary election, she contested on the platform of the Social Democrats in the district of Radlje ob Dravi. She received 1,794 votes (16.74%) of the vote and ranked second in the district. Between September 2018 and March 2020, she served as state secretary at the Ministry of Justice of the Republic of Slovenia. On 10 October 2020, she was elected the Vice President of Social Democrats (Slovenia). During 2022 Slovenian parliamentary election, she ran for office and received 759 (6.08%) votes and was not elected to office.

On 1 June 2022, she was appointed as the minister of justice in the 15th Government of Slovenia under the leadership of Prime Minister Robert Golob. She resigned in February 2024 with effect from 16 February due to strict liability in relation to alleged irregularities in the purchase of an office building on Litija Road (Litijska cesta) in Ljubljana. A few days earlier, on 12 February, she quit the Social Democrats.

== Personal life ==
In 2017, she married her husband Matjaž Pipan and has one child.

Political offices
Preceded by Marjan Dikaučič	Minister of Justice; 2022–present	Succeeded by Andreja Katič
