= Death of Aleš Šutar =

Fatal attack on a man in Slovenia

- Location: 45°48′18.82″N 15°9′57.27″E; LokalPatriot; Rozmanova 21, Novo Mesto
- Date: 25 October 2025; 2:30 CET
- Attack type: Beating
- Deaths: 1 (in hospital)
- No. of participants: approx. 20

On Saturday, 25 October 2025, around 2:30 a.m., in front of the LokalPatriot club on Rozmanova Street in Novo Mesto, a group of Roma severely beat a local citizen, father, and well-known Novo Mesto restaurateur, Aleš Šutar, who had come to pick up his son because the same group of Roma had threatened him. The man was seriously injured and later died in hospital. The Novo Mesto police suspected a 21-year-old Romani man from Šentjernej, a repeat offender, who was arrested in the afternoon of 25 October, while investigating the possibility of multiple perpetrators. The attacker had previously been dealt with as a juvenile for several criminal acts.

Police had intervened at the same location twice earlier that night, but according to their statements, the incidents were not connected. Tavern owner Rok Vovko stated that more than fifteen Roma were harassing and intimidating local children, and about an hour earlier a fight had broken out between the 21-year-old Romani man and an Albanian man, who was seriously injured. The police took down the participants’ information, but later the incident occurred in which a peaceful citizen, who allegedly came to protect his son from violence, was killed. Vovko added that such events are not rare in their neighborhood. The suspect was charged with causing particularly serious bodily harm, punishable by between 5 and 15 years in prison. As a juvenile, the perpetrator committed property crimes and two acts of violence, one of them a sexual assault on a person under 15. The police have not confirmed the suspect's Romani ethnicity.

The case garnered extensive attention in Slovenia, and prompted large protests in Novo Mesto. In response to the attack, Prime Minister Robert Golob's government introduced new security legislation, The Act on Urgent Measures to Ensure Public Security (Šutar's Act), which was passed by parliament on 17 November 2025. The law has been criticized by international NGOs as a violation of human rights targeted against the Roma community.
