= Valentina Prevolnik Rupel =

Slovenian politician (born 1971)

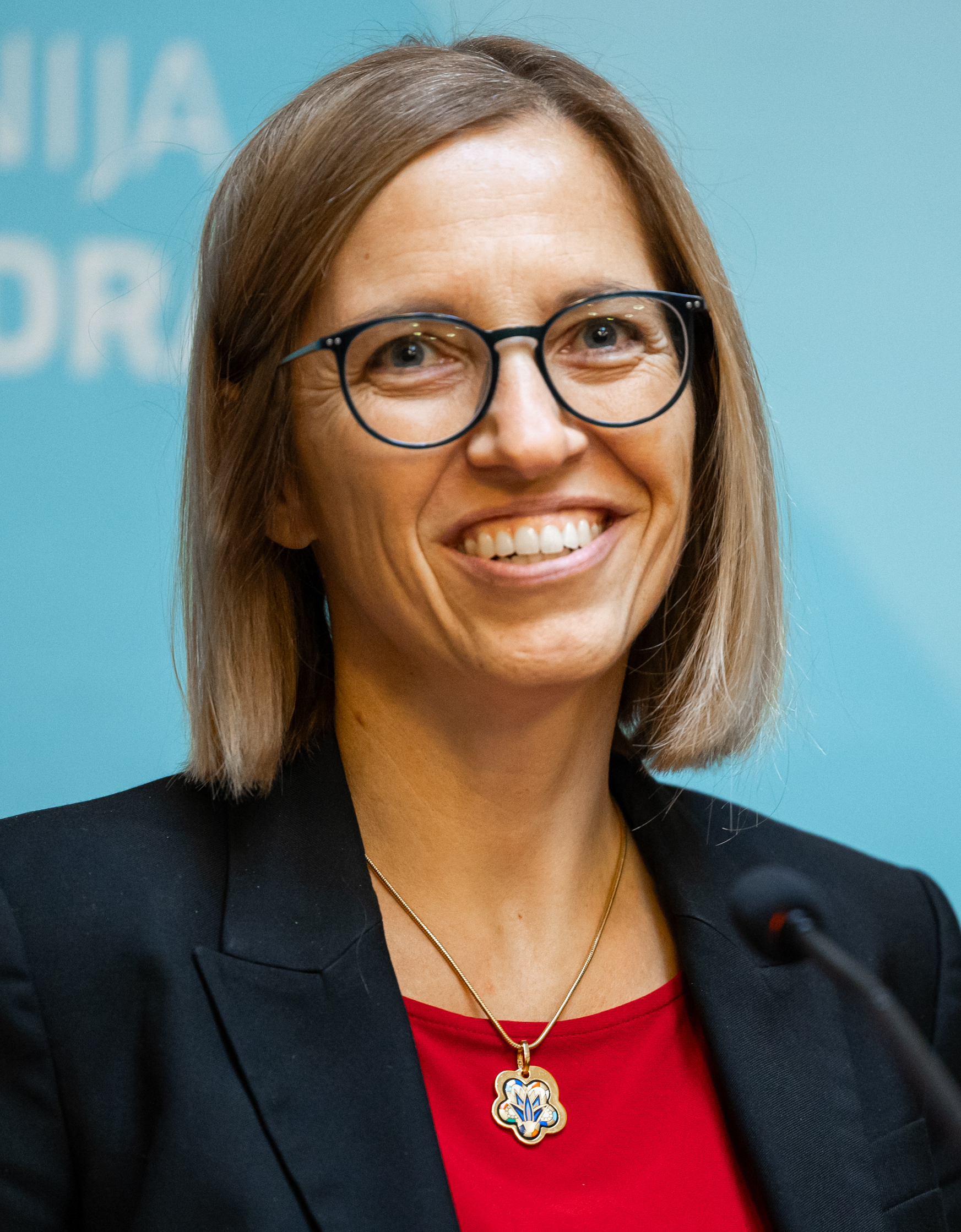

Minister of health
- In office 13 October 2023 – 4 June 2026

Personal details
- Born: 1971 (age 54–55) Ljubljana
- Education: University of Ljubljana

Valentina Prevolnik Rupel (born 1971) is a Slovenian government official and economist. She serves as the minister of health of Slovenia since 2023.

== Life ==
Valentina Prevolnik Rupel studied economics and has a PhD from the School of Economics and Business in Ljubljana.

She was State Secretary at the Ministry of Health on 13 July 2023 in the 15th Government of Slovenia. She is appointed minister of health of the Republic of Slovenia on 13 October 2023.
