= Andreja Katič =

Slovenian politician (born 1969)

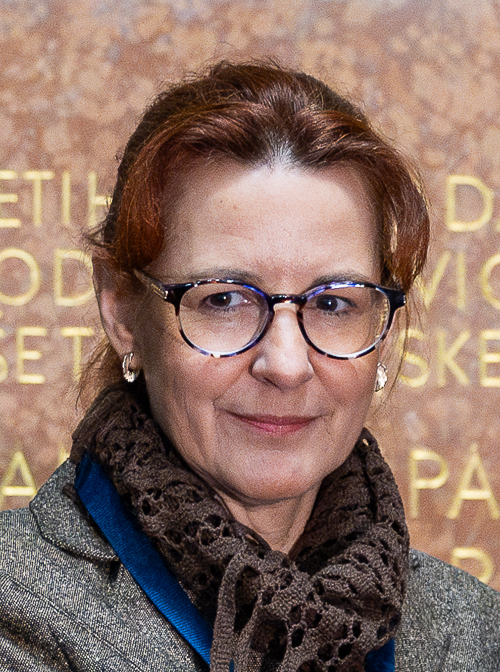
- Katič in 2024

Minister of Justice
- Incumbent
- Assumed office 5 March 2024
- Prime Minister: Robert Golob
- Preceded by: Dominika Švarc Pipan
- In office 13 September 2018 – 13 March 2020
- Prime Minister: Marjan Šarec
- Preceded by: Goran Klemenčič
- Succeeded by: Lilijana Kozlovič

Minister of Defence
- In office 13 May 2015 – 13 September 2018
- Prime Minister: Miro Cerar
- Preceded by: Janko Veber
- Succeeded by: Karl Erjavec

Personal details
- Born: 22 December 1969 (age 56) Slovenj Gradec, SR Slovenia, SFR Yugoslavia (now Slovenia)
- Party: Social Democrats
- Education: University of Maribor

Andreja Katič (born December 22, 1969, in Slovenj Gradec) is the minister of justice of the Republic of Slovenia in 2024.

Katič graduated from the Faculty of Law at the University of Maribor in 1996.

Katič entered politics in 2014, serving as a member of the Committee on Social Affairs, Health and Sustainable Development for one year.

She then served as defence minister from 2015 to 2018. On February 3, 2016, she approved the deployment of Slovenian troops in the Kurdish city of Erbil (Iraq), as part of international Military intervention against ISIL.

She served as minister of justice from September 2018 to March 2020 under Prime Minister Marjan Šarec. In March 2024 she was again appointed as the minister of justice of the RS.

After her first term as minister of justice, she became president of the SAŠA Regional Development Council in 2020; she is also the chair of the Women's Forum and children's rights commissioner for UNICEF's Velenje project.

On 26 October 2025, she offered to resign, after the killing of a citizen by Romani, and the prime minister, Robert Golob, accepted her resignation. She was officially dismissed on 3 November 2025, but stayed on as an acting minister.

Political offices
Preceded by Janko Veber	Minister of Defence; 2015–2018	Succeeded by Karl Erjavec
Preceded by Goran Klemenčič	Minister of Justice; 2018–2020	Succeeded by Lilijana Kozlovič
Preceded by Dominika Švarc Pipan	Minister of Justice; 2024–present	Incumbent
