= Igor Papič =

Slovenian engineer and politician

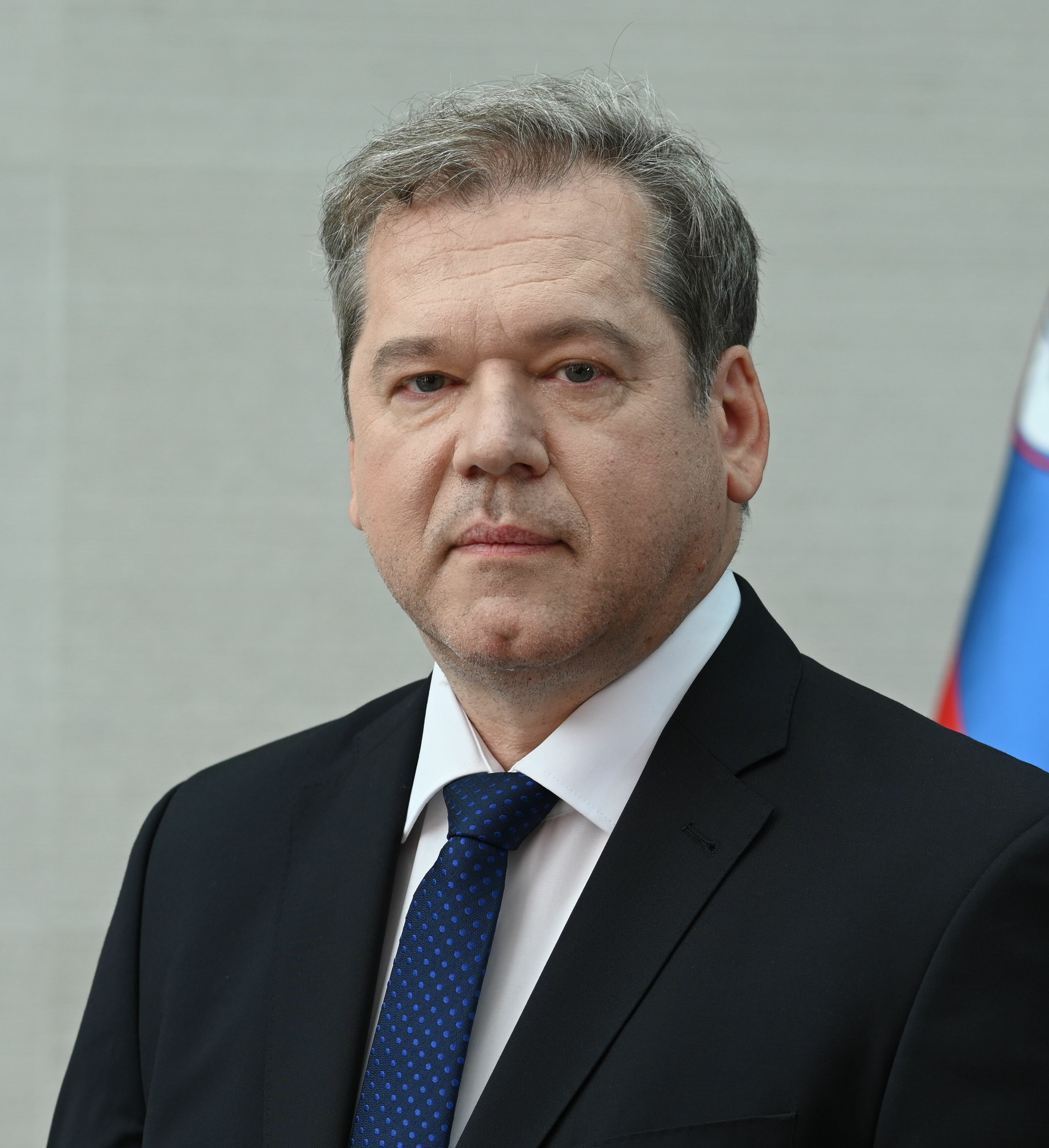
- Official portrait, 2022

Minister of Higher Education, Science and Innovation of the Republic of Slovenia
- In office 24 January 2023 – 4 June 2026
- Prime Minister: Robert Golob
- Preceded by: Himself (as Minister of Education, Science and Sports)

Minister of Education, Science and Sport of the Republic of Slovenia
- In office 1 June 2022 – 9 January 2023
- Succeeded by: Himself (as Minister of Higher Education, Science and Innovation)

Personal details
- Born: 24 May 1966 (age 60) Ljubljana, SR Slovenia, SFR Yugoslavia
- Party: Freedom Movement

Igor Papič (born 24 May 1966) is a Slovenian engineer and politician. He served as the minister of education, science, and sport of the Republic of Slovenia from June 2022 to January 2023 and as minister of higher education, science and innovation since January 2023. In 2017, he was elected rector of the University of Ljubljana.

He stood for re-election as rector of the University of Ljubljana in 2021. He was the runner-up to Gregor Majdič, who received 54.9% of the vote, and Igor Papič, who received 45.1% of the vote, and thus did not win a new term.
