= Klemen Boštjančič =

Slovenian businessman & politician (born 1972)

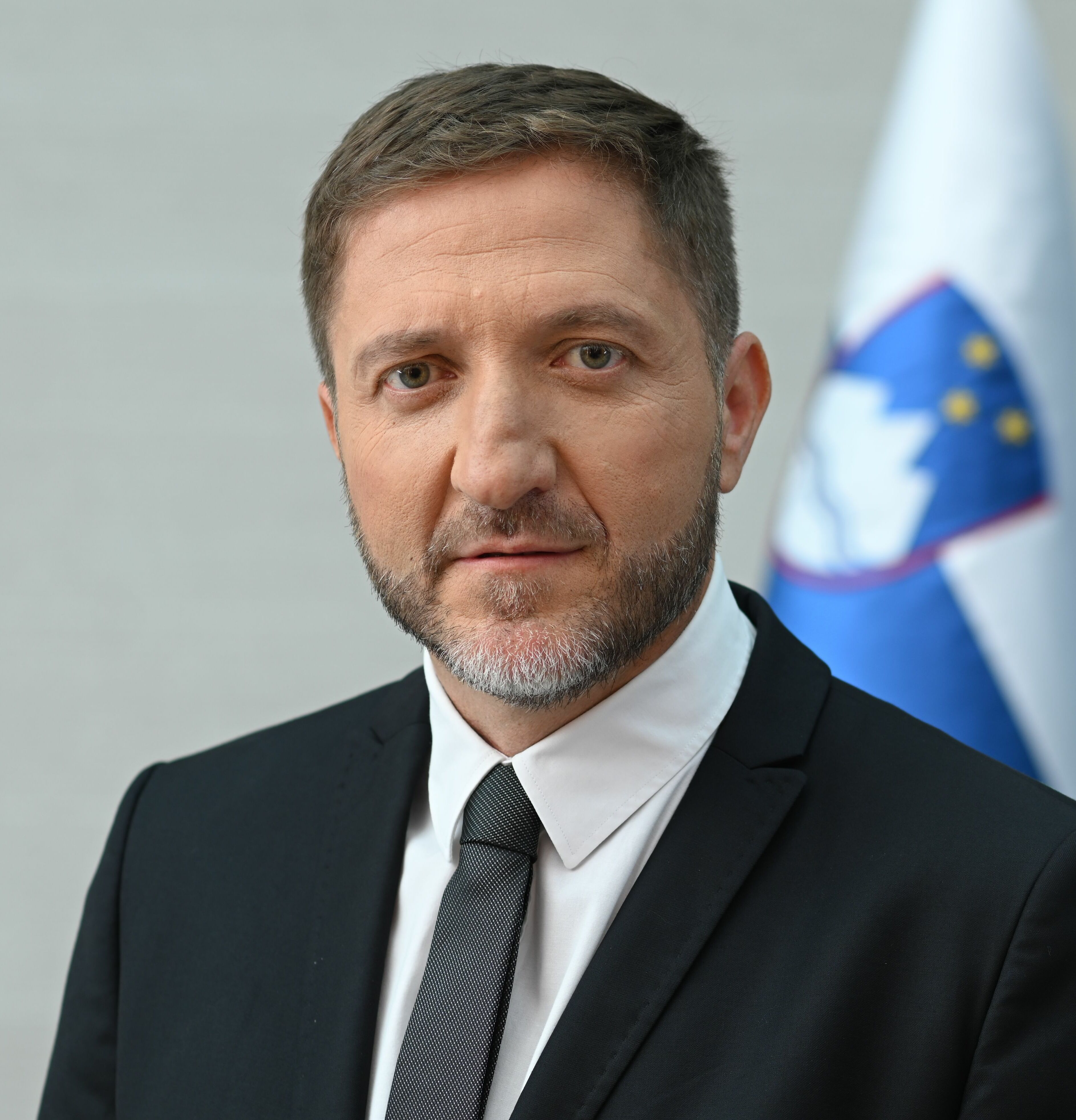
- Boštjančič in 2022

Deputy Prime Minister of Slovenia
- In office 1 June 2022 – 4 June 2026 Serving with Tanja Fajon; Luka Mesec
- Prime Minister: Robert Golob

Minister of Finance
- In office 1 June 2022 – 4 June 2026
- Prime Minister: Robert Golob
- Preceded by: Andrej Šircelj
- Succeeded by: Andrej Šircelj

President of the Management Board of Adria Airways
- In office 19 December 2011 – 20 December 2012

Personal details
- Born: 1 September 1972 (age 53) Ljubljana, SR Slovenia, SFR Yugoslavia
- Party: Freedom Movement (since 2022)
- Spouse: Eva Boštjančič

Klemen Boštjančič (born 1 September 1972) is a Slovenian businessman and politician who served as Minister of Finance from 2022 to 2026.

== Career ==
Boštjančič is an accountant by profession. He was the Chairman of the management board of Sava, the Chairman of the supervisory board of Sava Turizem and a member of the management board of the Association of Supervisors of Slovenia.

=== Adria Airways ===
In 2011, he was appointed Chairman of the management board of Adria Airways. In March 2012, he was first dismissed at a meeting of the supervisory board, but was later called back, as in the event of his departure, all Adria aircraft would remain on the ground.

=== Minister of Finance ===
On 2 June 2022, he was appointed the minister of finance in the 15th Government of Slovenia under the leadership of Robert Golob. At the hearing in the screening committee on 30 May 2022, he pointed out that the crisis could also be an opportunity and that he would advocate the re-establishment of the link between tax and social policy.

On 23 January 2024 the government appointed him as the Deputy Prime Minister in a correspondence session. On 14 March 2024 the government, led by Robert Golob, appointed Eva Boštjančič, wife of Boštjančič, as a member of the council of the Slovenian National Theatre Drama Ljubljana.

== Other activities ==
- World Bank, Ex-Officio Member of the Board of Governors (since 2022)

Government offices
Preceded by Andrej Šircelj	Minister of Finance; 2022–2026	Succeeded by Andrej Šircelj
