= II Gymnasium Split =

II. gimnazija - Split

Location
- Teslina 10; 21000 Split; Croatia
- Coordinates: 43°30′54.1″N 16°26′00.3″E

Information
- Type: Public, Grades 9-12
- Motto: Think Europe Croatian
- Established: 1992
- Principal: Ivanka Kovačević
- Faculty: 55
- Enrollment: around 720
- Colors: Blue
- Website: gimnazija-druga-st.skole.hr

IInd Gymnasium Split (Croatian: II. gimnazija Split), also known as "Druga gimnazija" ('Second Gymnasium') is a public high school located in Split, Croatia. It specializes in modern languages.

== Programs ==
In Croatia, grades are restarted upon entering high school, so the grades are 1st-4th. Next to the name of the subject is shown how many classes of the subject there are per week in each grade.

Subject	Language gymnasium
Subject	1st grade	2nd grade	3rd grade	4th grade
Croatian language	4	4	4	4
English language	4	4	4	4
French/German/Italian language	4	3	3	3
Latin language	2	2	-	-
Music Appreciation	1	1	1	1
Art History	1	1	1	1
Psychology	-	-	2	-
Logic	-	-	1	-
Philosophy	-	-	-	2
Sociology	-	-	2	-
History	2	2	2	2
Geography	2	2	1	2
Mathematics	3	3	3	3
Physics	2	2	2	2
Chemistry	2	2	2	2
Biology	2	2	2	2
Information Science	-	2	-	-
Politics and Economics	-	-	-	1
Physical Education	2	2	2	2
Elective (Religious Education or Ethics)	1	1	1	1

== Alumni ==
After the school year 2023/24, 124 graduates of this gymnasium enrolled at an institution of higher learning in Croatia, or 88.57% of students who took up the nationwide Matura exams. The most common destinations for these students were the University of Split faculties of humanities and social sciences, economics, and law, as well as the University of Zadar and the University of Zagreb faculty of humanities and social sciences.
