= Goran Klemenčič =

Slovenian lawyer (born 1972)

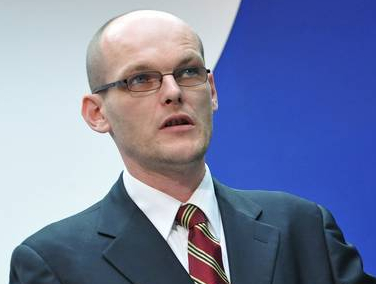

Minister of Justice
- In office 18 September 2014 – 13 September 2018
- Prime Minister: Miro Cerar
- Preceded by: Senko Pličanič
- Succeeded by: Andreja Katič

Personal details
- Born: 28 May 1972 (age 54) Kranj, Yugoslavia (now Slovenia)
- Party: Modern Centre Party
- Education: University of Ljubljana; Harvard University

Goran Klemenčič (born 28 May 1972, in Kranj, Yugoslavia) is a Slovene lawyer and public servant, notable as commissioner of the Commission for the Prevention of Corruption of the Republic of Slovenia.

== Life ==
He completed a master's degree at Harvard Law School after graduating from both Faculty of Law and Faculty of Computer Science at University of Ljubljana. He continued with post-graduate studies at the National University of Ireland.

== Work ==
He worked as a consultant at The European Committee on Crime Problems of the Council of Europe in Strasbourg, and the Organisation for Economic Co-operation and Development (OECD) in Paris. He also participated in the preparation of the legal bases of the International Criminal Court (ICC) in The Hague. For two years he was also a member of the OECD anti-corruption management committee.

In 2010, he became a Chief Commissioner of the Commission for the Prevention of Corruption of the Republic of Slovenia. In 2013, the Commission's 2012–2013 Investigation Report on the parliamentary parties' leaders revealed that Janez Janša, PM, and Zoran Janković, the head of the opposition, systematically and repeatedly violated the law by failing to properly report their assets. On 18 February 2015 the Supreme Court of Slovenia ruled that all sections regarding Janez Janša must be removed from this report because the Commission for the Prevention of Corruption failed to send the draft of the report to Janša for submission of his comments, and thus seriously violated Janša's rights, granted by the article 22 of the Slovenian constitution. On 29 May 2015 the Supreme Court of Slovenia additionally ruled that all sections regarding Zoran Janković must also be removed for exactly the same reason.

== Other activities ==
- World Economic Forum (WEF), Member of the Europe Policy Group (since 2017)
