= Mark Boris Andrijanič =

Slovenian politician and lawyer

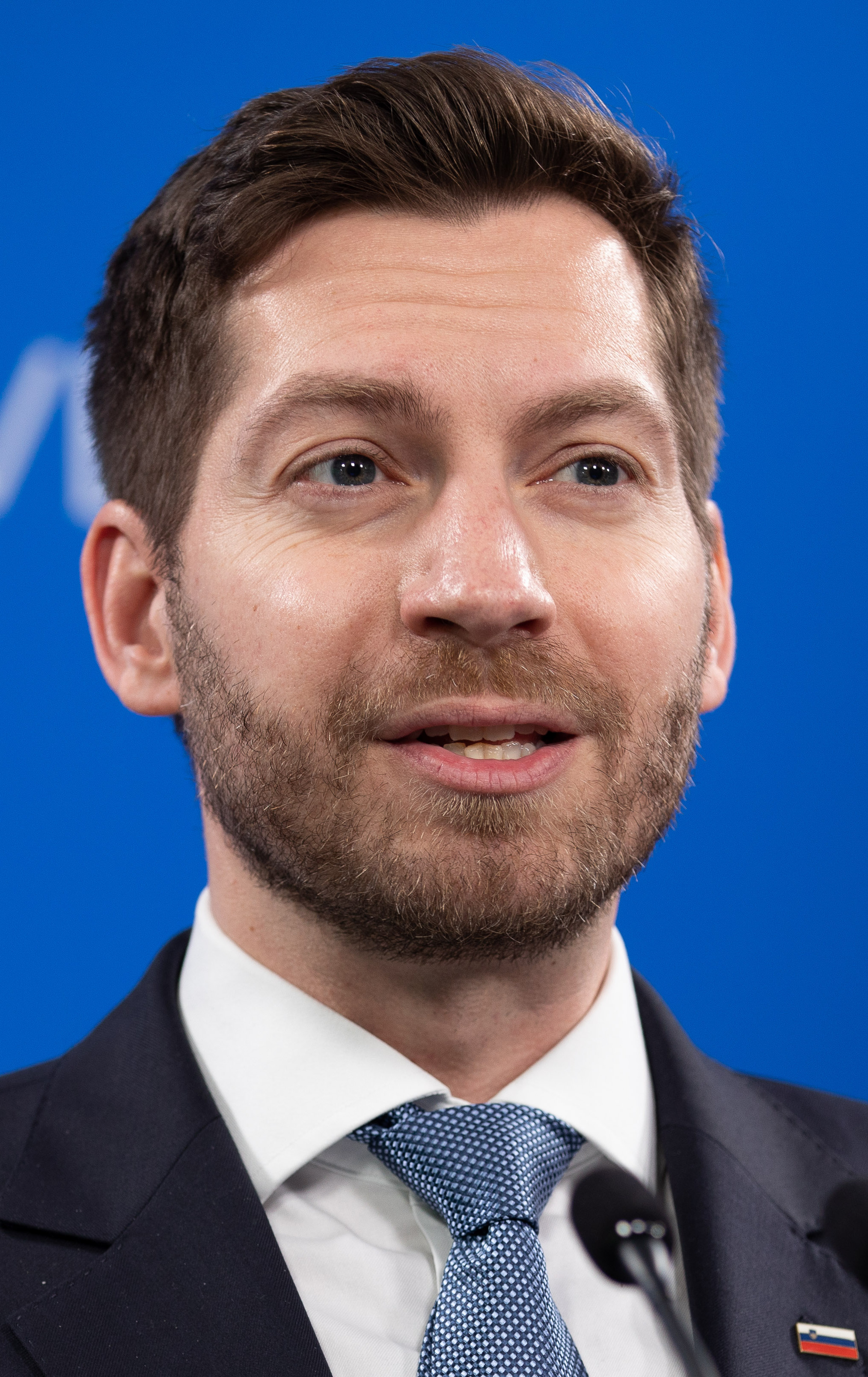
- Andrijanič in 2022

Minister for Digital Transformation
- In office 17 July 2021 – 1 June 2022
- Preceded by: Office established
- Succeeded by: Emilija Stojmenova Duh

Personal details
- Born: Mark Boris Andrijanič; 4 July 1983 (age 43)
- Party: New Slovenia
- Occupation: Politician, lawyer

Mark Boris Andrijanič (born 4 July 1983) is a Slovenian politician and lawyer.

Andrijanič was the first Minister for Digital Transformation of the Republic of Slovenia.

== Career ==
He attended the Škofija Classical High School in Ljubljana, where he studied English, French, Latin, and Greek. After matriculation, he enrolled at the Faculty of Law of the University of Ljubljana, where he graduated with honors, and further studied at the University of Oxford, where he obtained the title of Master of Public Policy or MPP. After his studies, he became an economic adviser to the government of the African country of Sierra Leone, and then continued his work as a researcher at the Martens Center for European Studies in Brussels, where he mainly dealt with European digital and economic policies. In 2016, he joined Uber's Public Policy team for the Central and Eastern Europe region. He worked as the director of corporate affairs to establish partnerships with governments and cities aimed at promoting digital transformation and smart mobility solutions.

=== Politics ===
In April 2021, the 14th government of the Republic of Slovenia appointed him head of the Strategic Council for Digitization, the government's consultative body. On 17 July 2021 the government appointed him to a newly created position - he became a minister without portfolio responsible for digital transformation. It was approved in the National Assembly with 45 votes, 44 against. One of the more prominent decisions during his ministry was the introduction of digital vouchers worth 150 euros, which enabled pupils in the last triad of elementary schools, pupils and students to buy computer equipment. Vouchers were also given to citizens aged 55 or older who attended digital literacy training subsidized under the Digital Inclusion Promotion Act. The vouchers came into effect on 15 June 2022.

In April 2022, the World Economic Forum ranked him among the 110 most promising young global leaders.
