= II Gymnasium, Maribor =

Coordinates: 46.5489°N 15.6442°E

II. gimnazija Maribor
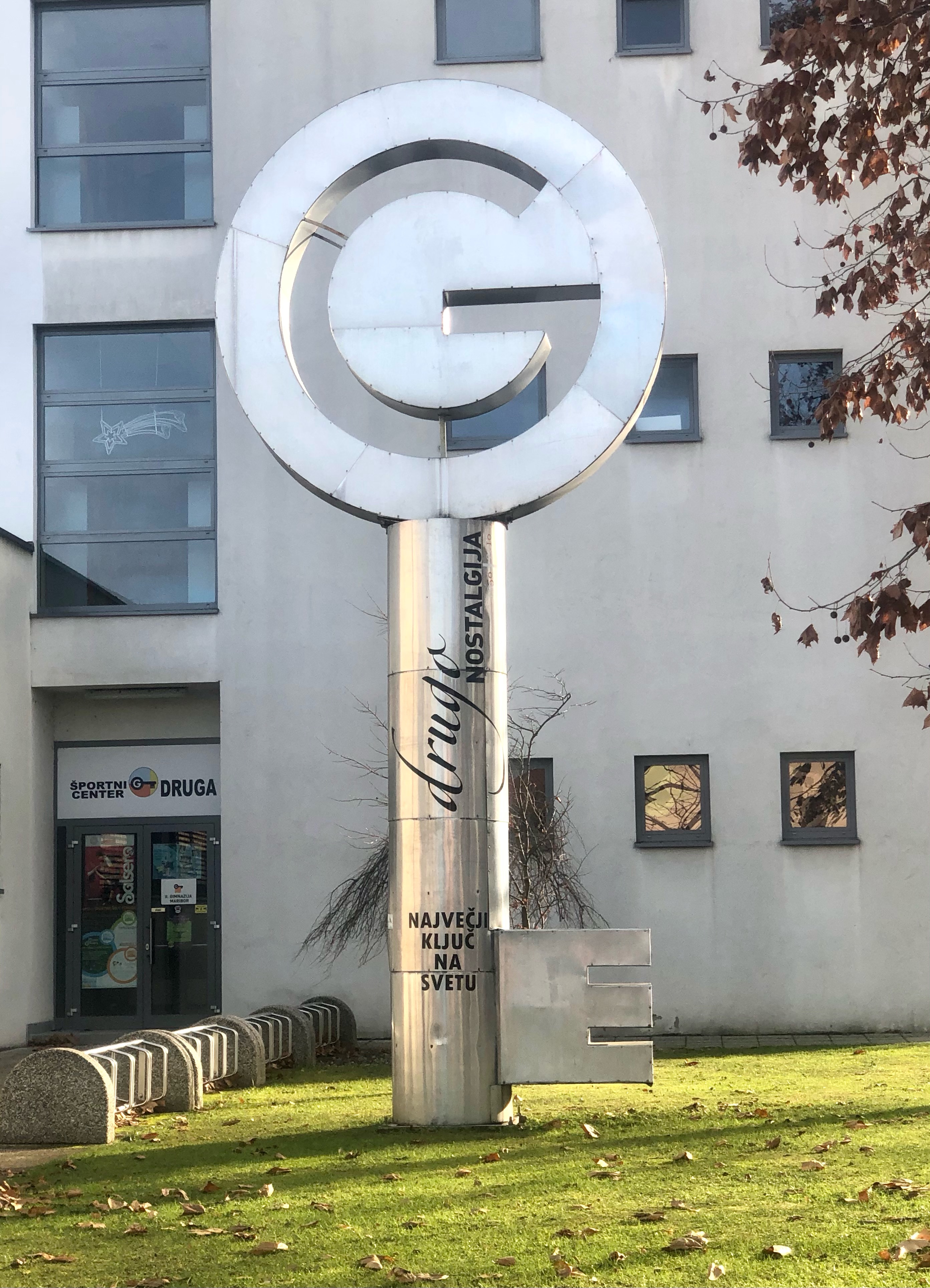

Location
- Trg Miloša Zidanška 1, Maribor; Maribor 2000; Slovenia

Information
- Type: Public Gymnasium - Grammar School
- Founded: 1937; 89 years ago
- Principal: dr. Marko Jagodič
- Grades: 9–12
- Enrollment: 700
- Campus: Urban
- Website: www.druga.si

The II Gymnasium (Slovene: II. gimnazija) is a gymnasium in Maribor, Slovenia. The beginnings of the school date back to 1937. It implements the grammar school program, the sports department and the International Baccalaureate program. It is one of the most selective schools in Slovenia and the school with one of the best matura results. Its graduates have been accepted to Harvard, Cambridge, and other world's leading universities.

== History ==
On Žolgarjeva street in Maribor, in today's Boris Kidrič and Slavko Šlander primary schools, the authorities established the II. boys' bourgeois school (1937). In 1939, the construction of a new school on Žolgarjeva street (today Trg Miloša Zidanška) began, which was built after more than ten years. The name 'second gymnasium' first appeared in 1938. The school was later renamed II. state men's lower gymnasium and Viktor Rode was appointed principal.

The school was declared a complete gymnasium in 1949; it was given the name II. gymnasium and moved to a new building on Žolgarjeva street. Janez Malnarič became the new principal, and the students took the first matura exam a year later. Next to the modern gym, the school also got a sports field. With the Gymnasium Reform (1959), the primary schools took over the departments of the lower gymnasiums, and the upper gymnasium became a four-year school. In 1960, Ivan Rudolf became the principal and was succeeded by Alfonz Fekonja. With the abolition of the classical gymnasium, II. Gymnasium Maribor took over several departments of the Classical Gymnasium and the I. Gymnasium Maribor (Prva gimnazija Maribor).

When in 1964, the II. Gymnasium was renamed Tabor Gymnasium (Gimnazija Tabor), the school received a library and a reading room. A few years later, they introduced graduation in four subjects by changing the final exams. In 1971, the Tabor Gymnasium (Gimnazija Tabor) was renamed The Miloš Zidanšek Gymnasium (Gimnazija Miloša Zidanška). In celebration of the school's 25th anniversary, on the 2nd floor, they added a new hall, known as the "amphitheatre". When Slovenia abolished gymnasiums and introduced 'targeted education', the school focused on science and mathematics. At that time, The Miloš Zidanšek Gymnasium (Gimnazija M. Zidanška), in agreement with the Secondary Electro-Computer School (SERŠ Maribor), began to educate eight departments of energy and the department of computer science. Today it still educates one department of graphic orientation.

In 1982, Ivan Lorenčič became the principal, and in the same year, the Miloš Zidanšek Gymnasium was renamed the Miloš Zidanšek High School of Natural Sciences (Srednja naravoslovna šola Miloša Zidanška). Over the years, the school quickly achieved an increase in enrollment in science and mathematics. The first terminal was connected to the University of Maribor line in the library, and the school received computers and printers. The school library was the first in Slovenia to introduce an electronic borrowing system. In the same year, the school introduced the International Baccalaureate (IB) program.

In 1990, Slovenia, and the school, re-introduced the gymnasium program. The school also started the sports department. In celebration of the school's 40th anniversary (1990), the school became the II. Gymnasium Maribor and Herta Trikič became the principal. The first IB exams had above-average results, and they ranked the II. Gymnasium among the most successful schools of this program. In 1994, the school had three golden graduates in the International Baccalaureate program; a student also attended the IB conference in Japan. In 1995 the first national graduation was held, and at the same time, the school had nine golden graduates in the national program and seven in the IB. In 1996, the school had one golden graduate in the national program and seven golden graduates in the International Baccalaureate. In 1997 the school had five golden graduates in the national program and five in the International Baccalaureate. In 1998, the school had fourteen golden graduates in the national program and five golden in the International Baccalaureate, one of them for the first time with all possible points. Some years later, the school had eleven golden graduates in the national program and seven golden in the IB program.

From 1993 to 1998. many students won prizes at the Olympics, where they were very successful in physics, mathematics, and chemistry. School's students won medals in Olympics (slalom, swimming). They were competing in countries worldwide, including the USA, Turkey, Canada, Australia and Norway.

In 2001, Ivan Lorenčič became the principal of the school again. Renovation of the old school building began with constructing an extension and a gym, which was completed in 2009. In 2021, Lorenčič retired and Marko Jagodič became the principal. Jagodič holds a Ph.D. in physics and an assistant professor at the University of Maribor.

== Profile ==
The Second Gymnasium has the highest enrolment threshold among Maribor gymnasiums and is the gymnasium with the most golden graduates in Maribor.

It is also among the most successful Slovenian grammar schools regarding the number of high school graduates with all possible points. In 2019, two high school graduates in Slovenia received all possible points, and both were students of the II. gymnasium. Students achieve excellent results at the international matura. In the International Baccalaureate program in 2019 and 2020, three female students earned all possible points and became diamond graduates.

Several students of the II. Gymnasium enrolled in the world's best universities. Ana Bračič graduated from Harvard University in 2005 and obtained MA and Ph.D degrees from New York University in 2007 and 2013, respectively. In 2019, Maša Predin enrolled at the University of Cambridge, Zala Šeško at the University of London, and in 2020, Ana Breznik at Harvard University. According to the principal Lorenčič, the trend of enrolling students in the II. Gymnasium to foreign universities increases from year to year.

The principal of the Second Gymnasium is Ivan Lorenčič, who has been the principal of this school for 30 years. In the meantime, he was a director of the Institute for Education for seven years. Later he was also a teacher for four years before he became the principal.

II. gimnazija Maribor
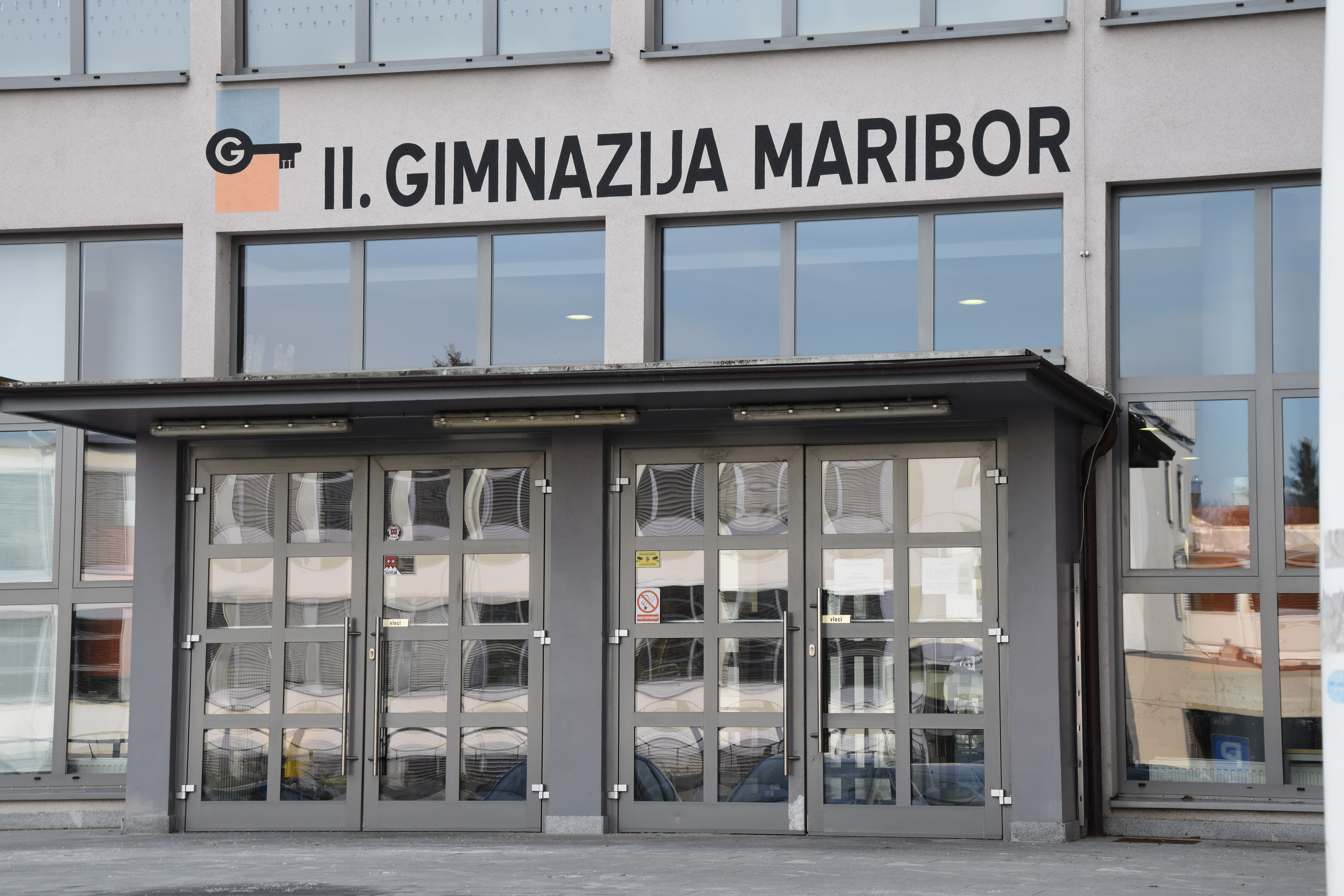
The entrance to the Second Gymnasium

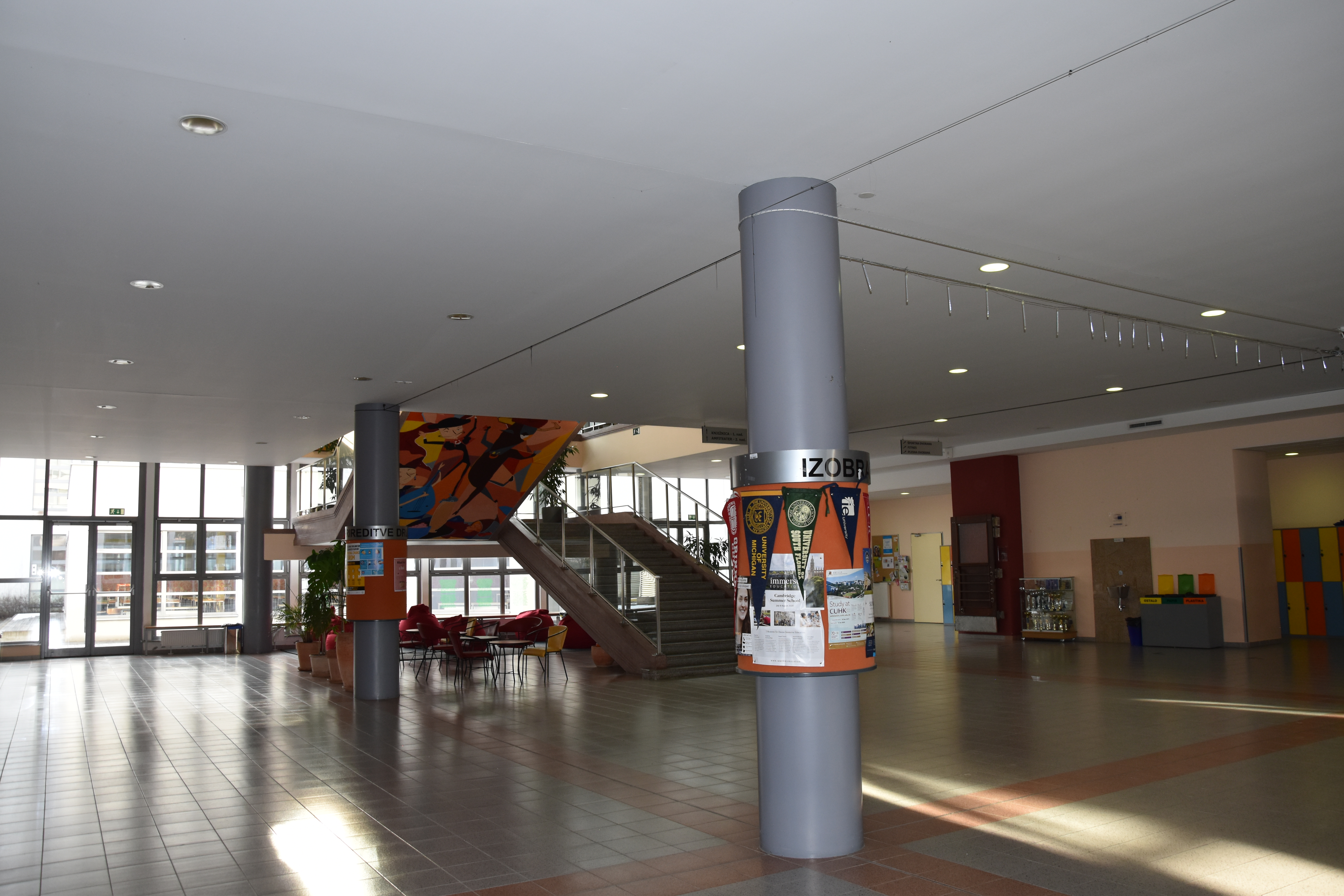
The II. gymnasium Maribor

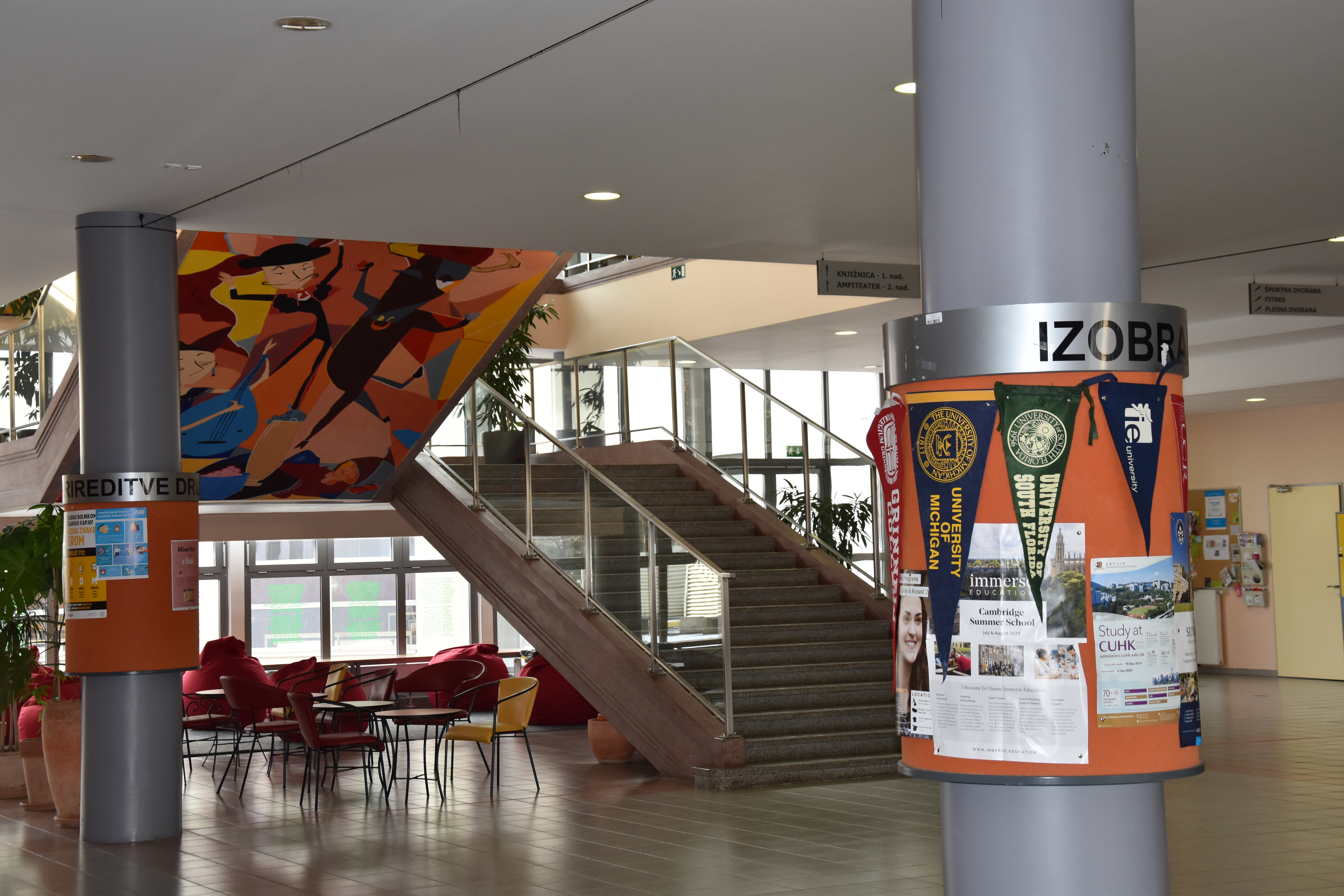
The II. gymnasium Maribor

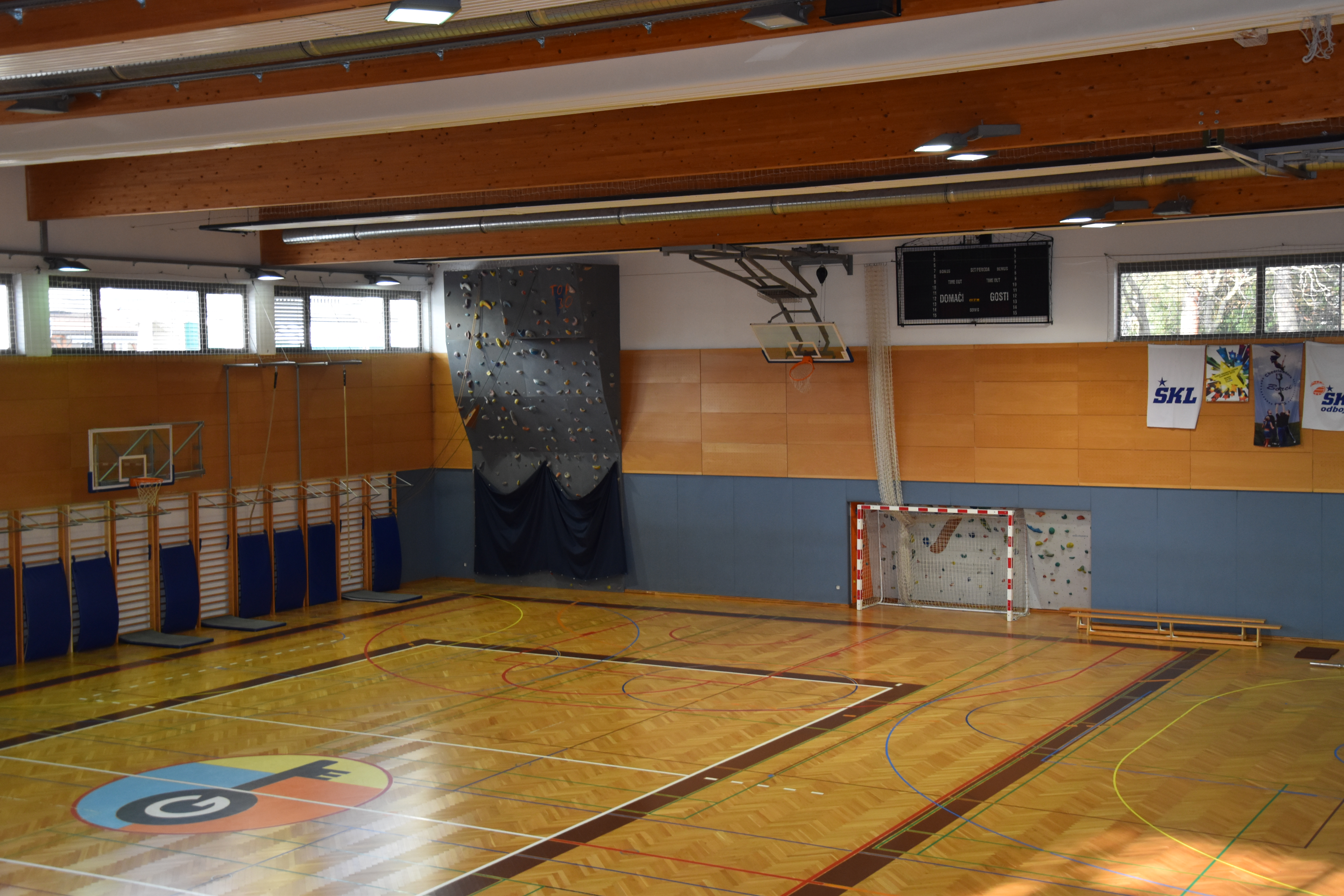
The school gym

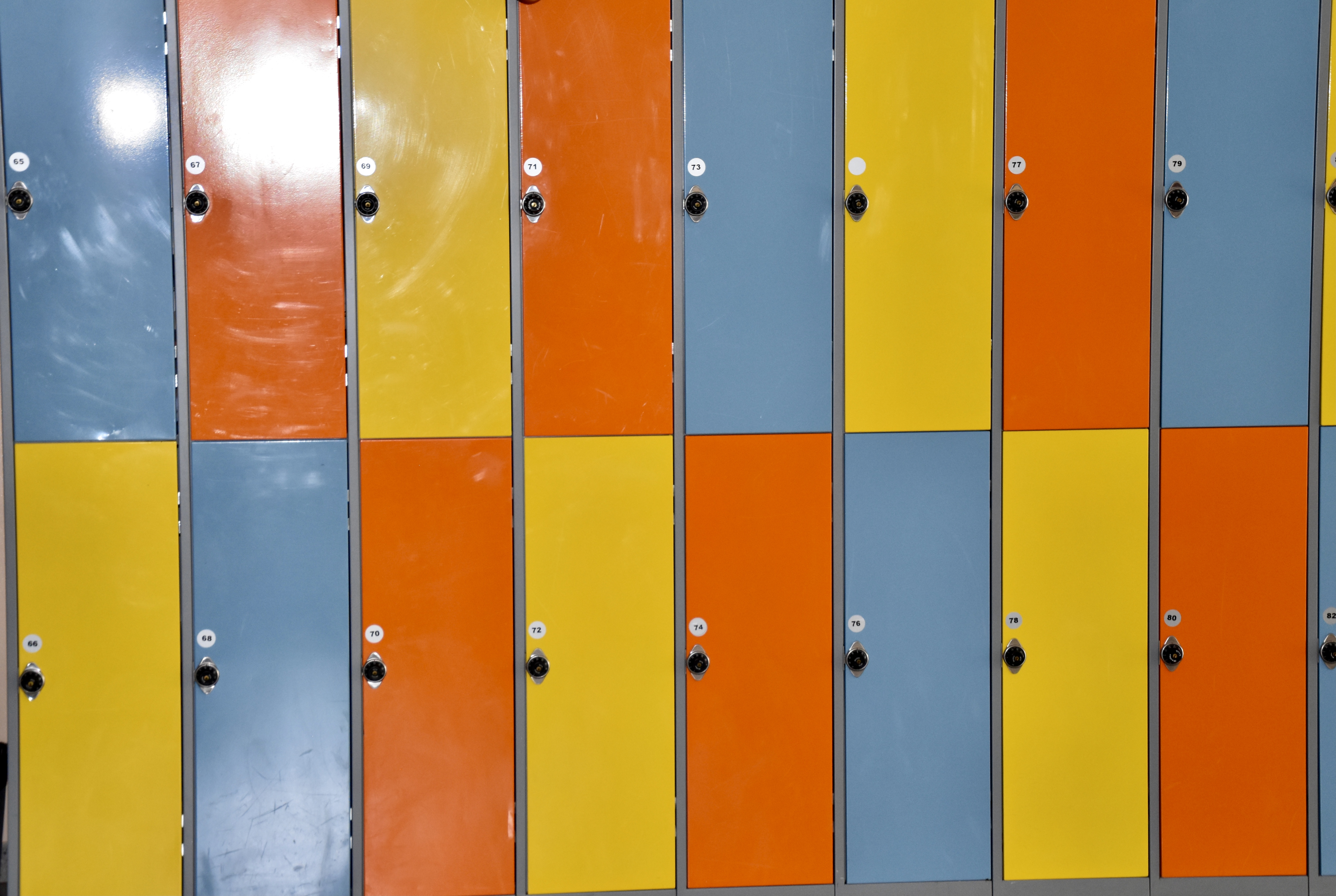
The lockers in the Second Gymnasium Maribor

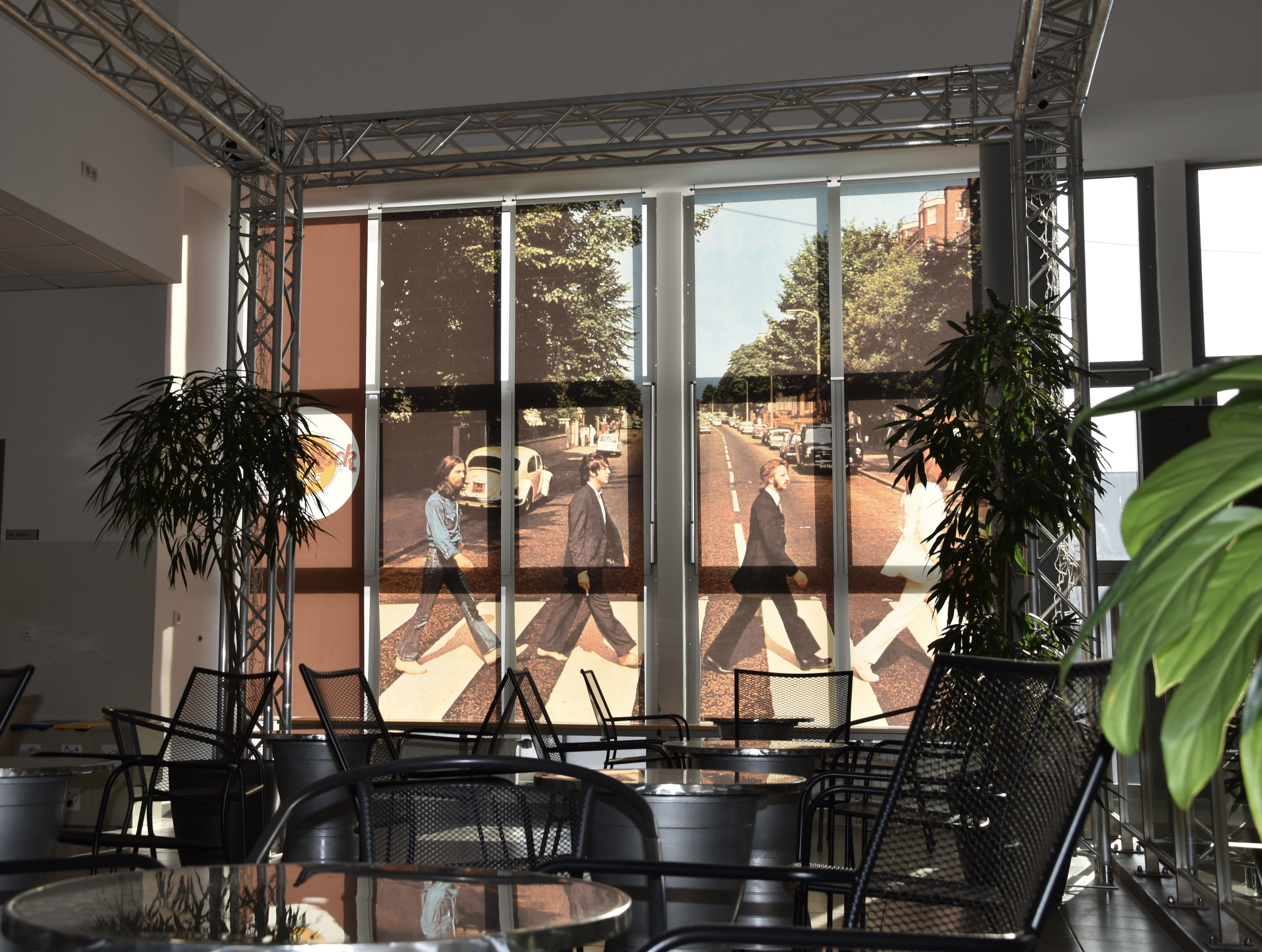
The Beatles study corner

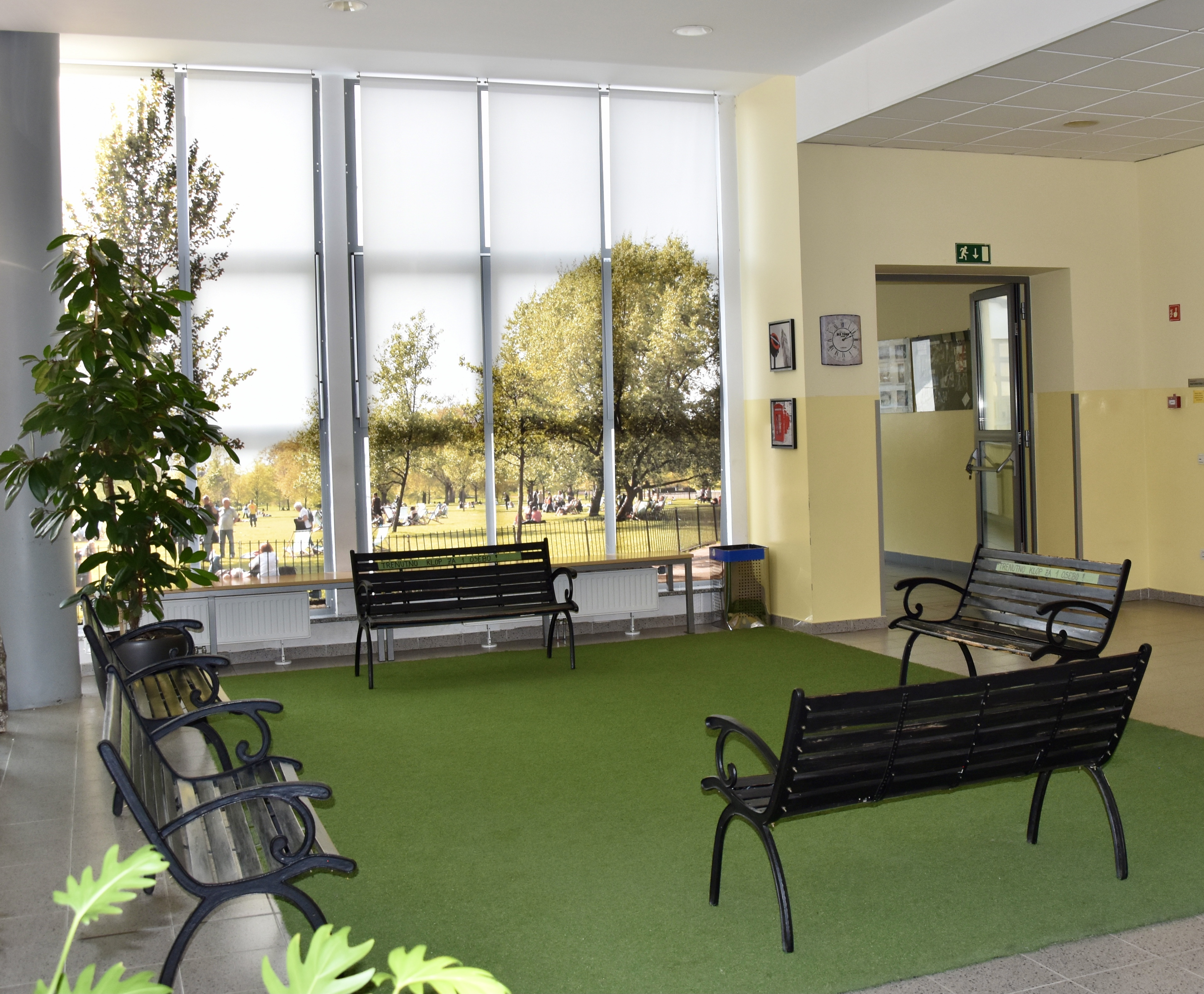
The study corner

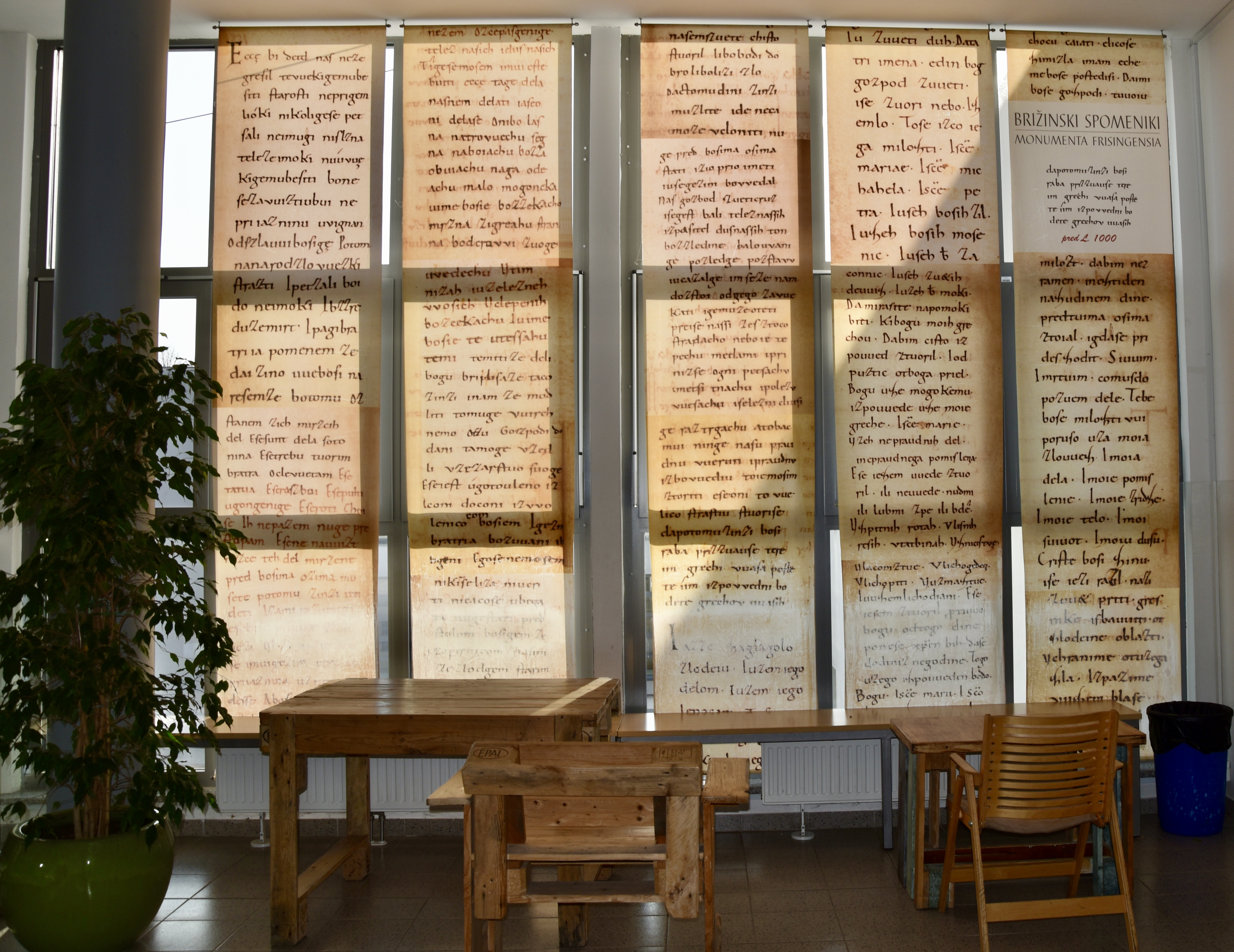
The Brizinski study corner in II. gimnazija Maribor

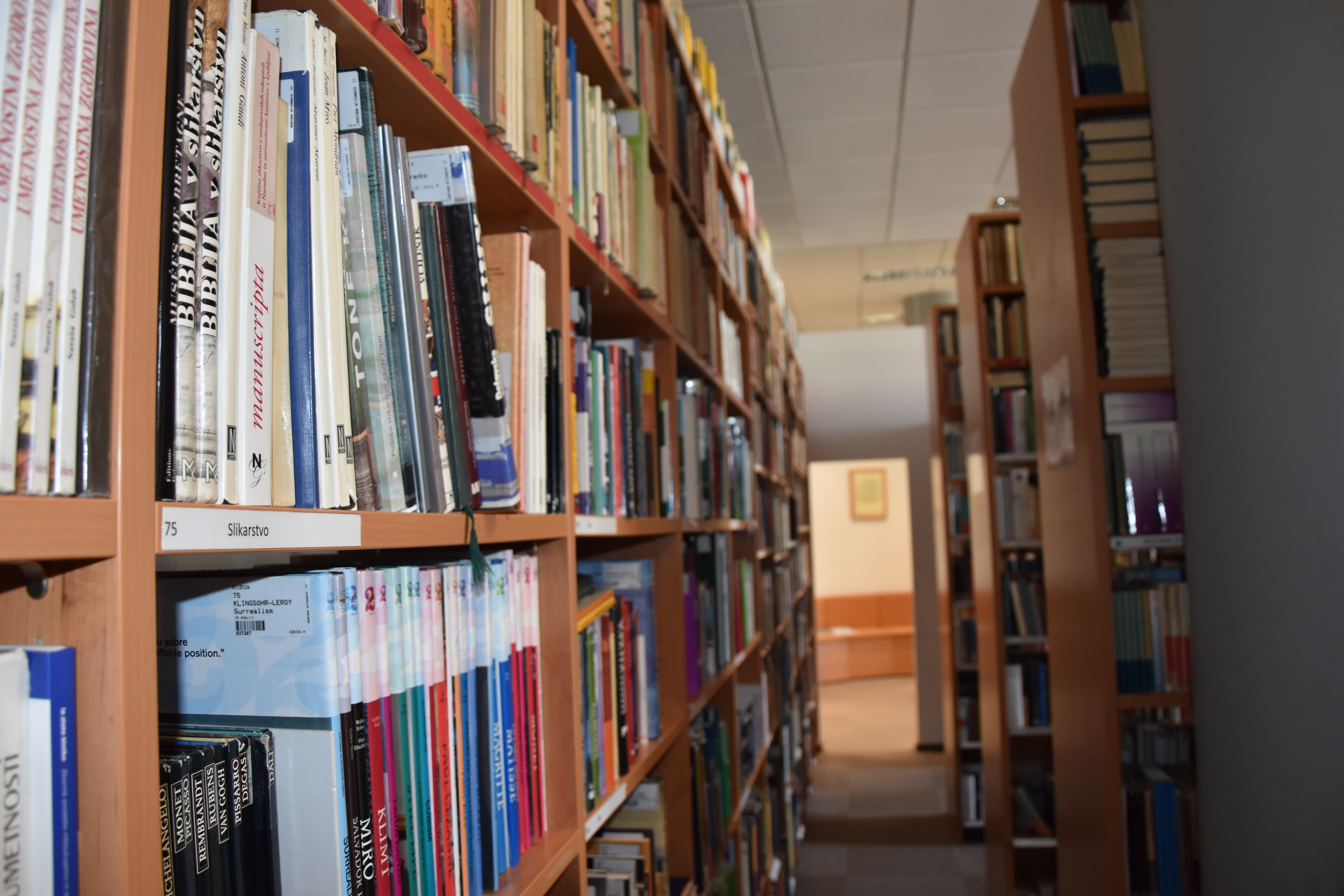
The library

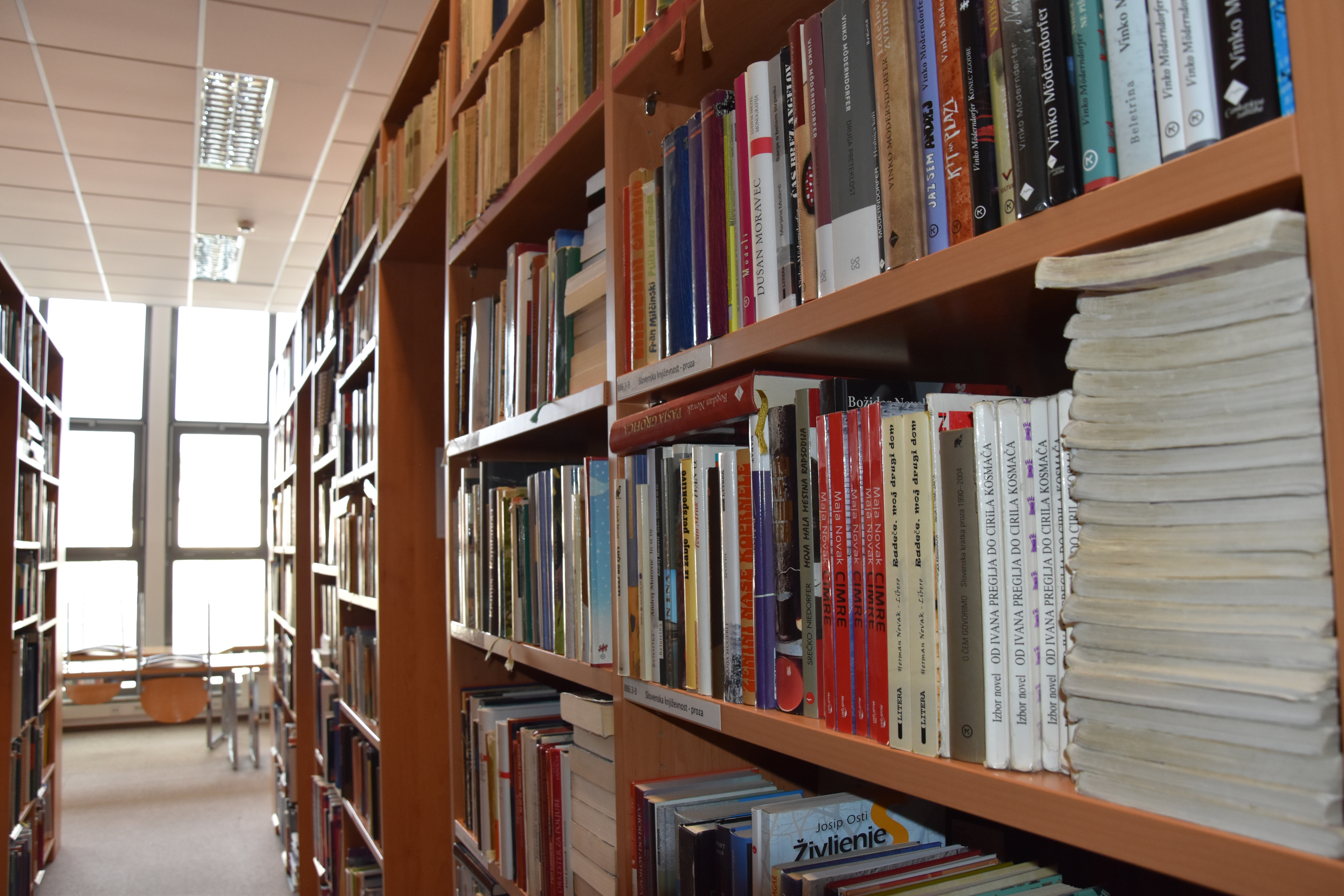
The school library
Example 1
