= Ministry of Justice (Slovenia) =

Government ministry of Slovenia

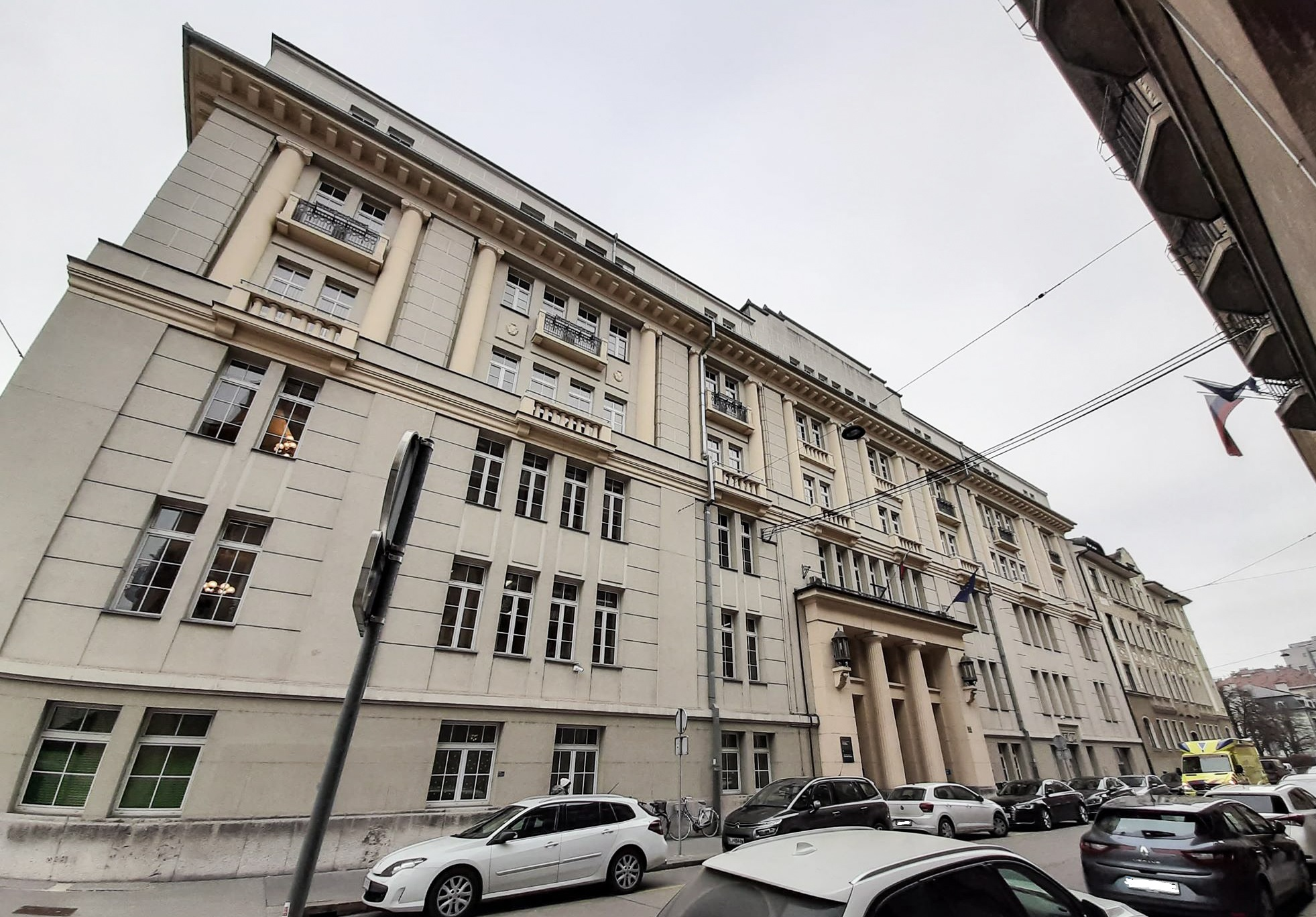
Ministry of Justice of Slovenia

The Minister of Justice of the Republic of Slovenia is the political leader of the Ministry of Justice of the Republic of Slovenia, proposed by the prime minister of the Republic of Slovenia and appointed by the National Assembly of the Republic of Slovenia and is a member of the Government of the Republic of Slovenia under the Government of the Republic of Slovenia Act.

== List of ministers ==
=== State Secretary for Justice and Administration ===
- Rajko Pirnat (May 16, 1990 – May 14, 1992)

=== Minister of Justice and Administration ===
- Miha Kozinc (May 14, 1992 - January 25, 1993)

=== Minister of Justice ===
- Miha Kozinc (25 January 1993-dismissed on 19 July 1994)
- Meta Zupancic (July 19, 1994 – February 27, 1997)
- Tomaž Marušič (27 February 1997 – 7 June 2000)
- Barbara Brezigar (7 June 2000 – 30 November 2000) [1st female]
- Ivan Bizjak (November 30, 2000 – December 19, 2002)
- Ivan Bizjak (December 19, 2002 – April 20, 2004)
- Zdenka Cerar (20 April 2004 – 3 December 2004)
- Lovro Šturm (appointed on 3 December 2004-dismissed on 7 November 2008)
- Aleš Zalar (appointed on 21 November 2008-dismissed on 20 September 2011)

=== Minister of Justice and Public Administration ===
- Senko Pličanič (appointed on 10 February 2012-resigned on 24 January 2013)
- Zvonko Černač (provisionally authorized on 1 February 2013 -dismissed on 27 February 2013)

=== Minister of Justice ===
- Senko Pličanič (appointed on 20 March 2013- dismissed on 18 September 2014)
- Goran Klemenčič (appointed on September 18, 2014 – May 2022)
- Dominika Švarc Pipan (appointed June 1, 2022 – Present)

== See also ==
- Justice ministry
- Minister za pravosodje Republike Slovenije (Minister of Justice of the Republic of Slovenia)
- Politics of Slovenia
