= Robert Golob =

Prime Minister of Slovenia from 2022 to 2026

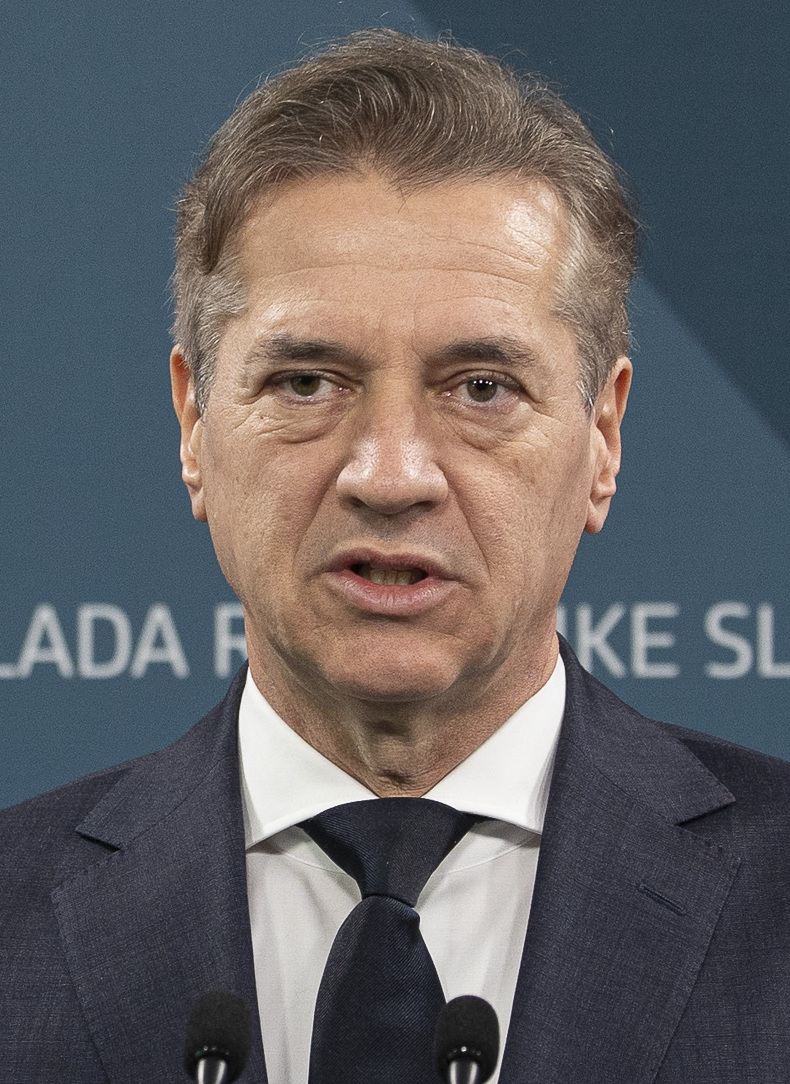
- Golob in 2026

Prime Minister of Slovenia
- In office 1 June 2022 – 4 June 2026
- President: Borut Pahor; Nataša Pirc Musar
- Deputy: Klemen Boštjančič; Tanja Fajon; Luka Mesec
- Preceded by: Janez Janša
- Succeeded by: Janez Janša

Leader of the Freedom Movement Party
- Incumbent
- Assumed office 26 January 2022
- Deputy: Urška Klakočar Zupančič (2022–2023); Sara Žibrat (2023–present); Klemen Boštjančič (2023–present); Matej Arčon (2023–present)
- Preceded by: Jure Leben

Personal details
- Born: 23 January 1967 (age 59) Šempeter pri Gorici, SR Slovenia, Yugoslavia
- Party: Freedom Movement (2022–present)
- Other political affiliations: LDS (1999–2002); PS (2011–2014); SAB (2014)
- Spouses: Jana Nemec (divorced) Tina Gaber (m. 2025)
- Children: 3
- Education: University of Ljubljana (BS, MS, PhD); Georgia Institute of Technology

Robert Golob (born 23 January 1967) is a Slovenian businessman, engineer and politician, serving as Prime Minister of Slovenia from 2022 to 2026 and leader of the Freedom Movement since 2022.

== Early life and education ==
Golob obtained his PhD in electrical engineering at the University of Ljubljana in 1994 and continued his studies as a post-doctoral Fulbright scholar in the United States, at the Georgia Institute of Technology in Atlanta.

== Business career ==
In 2004, Golob co-founded the energy trading company GEN-I, which is state-controlled, and where he remained chairman until 2021.

== Political career ==
Between May 1999 and June 2000, Golob was the State Secretary at the Ministry of Economic Affairs in the government led by prime minister Janez Drnovšek of the LDS party. In 2002, he was elected to the City Council of Nova Gorica, a position he held until 2022. In 2011, Golob joined the Positive Slovenia party, founded by the mayor of Ljubljana Zoran Janković. In 2013–14, with the rising tensions within the party between its founder and chairman Zoran Janković and Prime Minister Alenka Bratušek, Golob played a mediating role between the two factions. In May 2014, after the final split between the two factions, he joined the breakaway Party of Alenka Bratušek (SAB), becoming one of its vice-presidents. After SAB's poor performance in the subsequent 2014 election, he moved away from national-level politics, remaining active only at the local level in his municipality of Nova Gorica. Among other engagements, he chaired the neighborhood assembly of Kromberk-Loke between 2010 and 2014, and remained member until 2022.

In 2021, Golob decided to once again take an active role in national politics, after his term as chairman of GEN-I had not been extended.

== Prime minister (2022–2026) ==
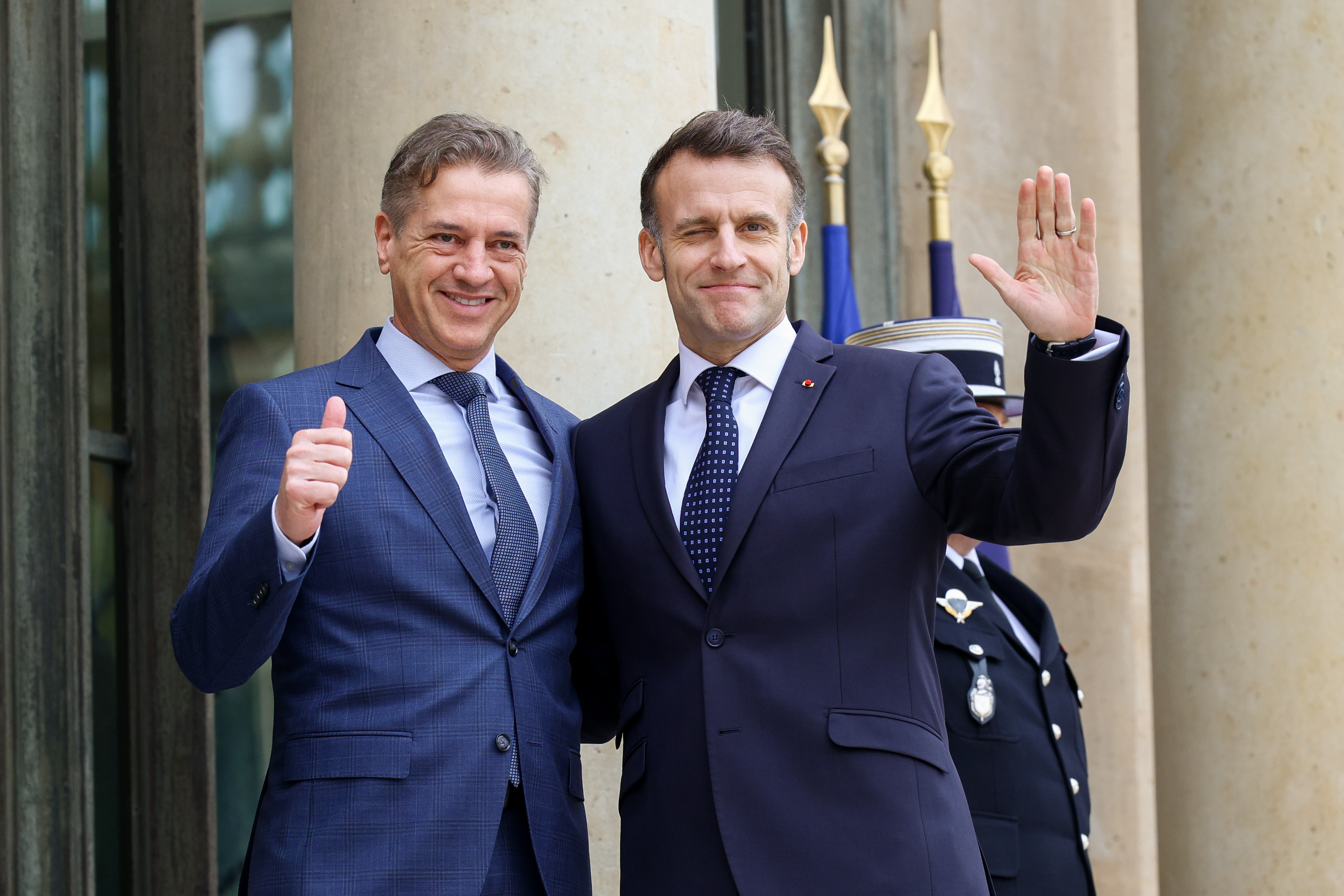
Golob with French President Emmanuel Macron, 27 February 2026

In January 2022, Golob took over the small extra-parliamentary Green Actions Party and renamed it the Freedom Movement. On 24 April 2022, in the 2022 Slovenian parliamentary election, the Freedom Movement won 41 seats in the 90-seat National Assembly.

Golob formed the government by joining forces with Social Democrats, another centre-left party, and The Left, giving him a majority in the legislature. On 25 May 2022, Golob was appointed Prime Minister of Slovenia by the National Assembly.

The government led by Golob approved a new Family Code in October 2022 in accordance with the ruling of the Slovenian Constitutional Court outlawing prohibitions of same-sex marriage. This made same-sex marriage legal in Slovenia.

=== Domestic Policy ===
==== Ministries ====
Upon taking office, Golob also announced an expansion of the number of ministries. The amended Government Act had already been adopted on 22 June 2022, but the Slovenian Democratic Party collected enough signatures to call for a referendum. This took place on 27 November 2022, and voters supported the amendment with 56.69% in favor. The Golob government implemented the change a year after. The competencies of some existing ministries were changed, and three new ones were established: the Ministry of a Solidarity Future, the Ministry of Higher Education, Science and Innovation, and the Ministry of Environment, Climate and Energy. With this, the government had 19 ministries and one government office.

==== Healthcare ====
As one of the goals of his term, Robert Golob has set up a health reform. One of the major objectives was abolishing supplementary health insurance.

=== Foreign policy ===
==== Middle East ====
Golob criticized Israel's military operations in the Gaza Strip during the Gaza war. In May 2024, he announced that his government would recognize the Palestinian state. In July 2025, Itamar Ben-Gvir and Bezalel Smotrich were also sanctioned under his government.

==== NATO ====
NATO Secretary General Mark Rutte sent a letter to Prime Minister Golob at the end of May 2026. In it, he accused Slovenia of undermining the alliance and manipulating data on defense spending when the allies had agreed to raise it to at least two percent of GDP. At the time, Slovenia was also trying to achieve this goal with investments that were not included in defense spending. Without these investments, Slovenia would have allocated only about 1.6 percent of GDP to defense, which is about 300 million euros less than NATO's requirements. The Prime Minister's Office responded that they were advocating a "broader understanding of security" and that two percent of GDP was the highest amount up to that point.

== Personal life ==
Golob was married to Jana Nemec Golob for over thirty years. They have three children together. Since autumn 2022, he has been living with Tina Gaber, a former model, in Ljubljana. In September 2025, Golob and Gaber got married in Strunjan.

== See also ==
- List of current heads of state and government
- List of heads of the executive by approval rating

Party political offices
Preceded by Jure Leben	Leader of the Freedom Movement Party; 2022–present	Incumbent
Political offices
Preceded by Janez Janša	Prime Minister of Slovenia; 2022–2026	Succeeded by Janez Janša
