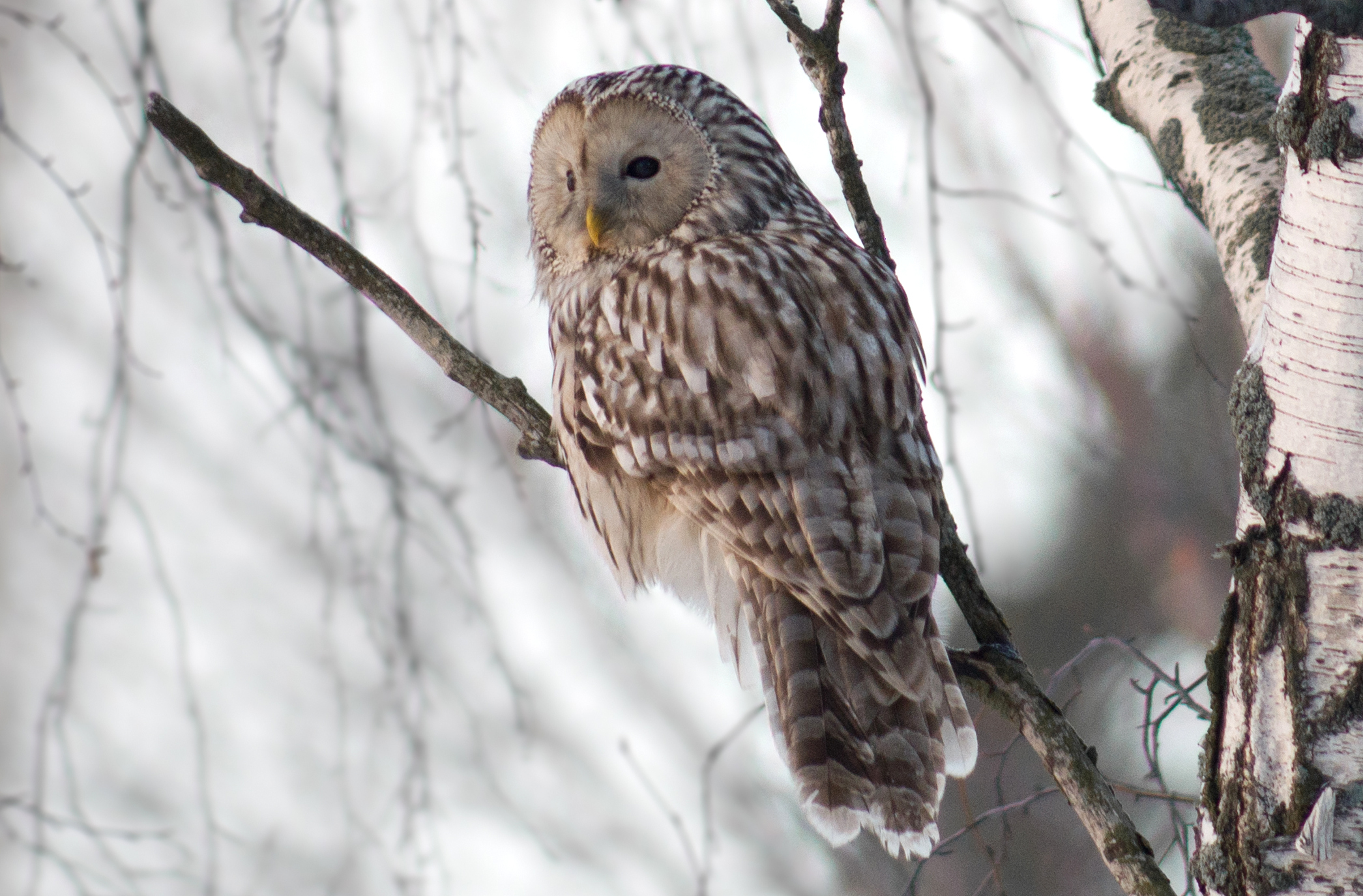
- At Kotka, Finland

Conservation status
- Least Concern (IUCN 3.1)
- CITES Appendix II

Scientific classification
- Kingdom: Animalia
- Phylum: Chordata
- Class: Aves
- Order: Strigiformes
- Family: Strigidae
- Genus: Strix
- Species: S. uralensis

Binomial name
- Strix uralensis Pallas, 1771
- Range of S. uralensis Resident

= Ural owl =

Species of owl

The Ural owl (Strix uralensis) is a large nocturnal owl. It is a member of the true owl family, Strigidae. The Ural owl is a member of the genus Strix, that is also the origin of the family's name under Linnaean taxonomy. Both its common name and scientific name refer to the Ural Mountains of Russia where the type specimen was collected. However, this species has an extremely broad distribution that extends as far west as much of Scandinavia, montane eastern Europe, and, sporadically, central Europe, thence sweeping across the Palearctic broadly through Russia to as far east as Sakhalin and throughout Japan. The Ural owl may include up to 15 subspecies, but most likely the number may be slightly fewer if accounting for clinal variations.

This forest owl is typical associated with the vast taiga forest in Eurosiberia, although it ranges to other forest types, including mixed forests and temperate deciduous forest. The Ural owl is something of a dietary generalist like many members of the Strix genus, but it is usually locally reliant on small mammals, especially small rodents such as voles. In terms of its reproductive habits, Ural owls tend to vigorously protect a set territory on which they have historically nested on a variety of natural nest sites, including tree cavities and stumps and nests originally built by other birds but now, in many parts of the range are adapted to nest boxes made by biologists and conservationists. Breeding success is often strongly correlated with prey populations. The Ural owl is considered to be a stable bird species overall, with a conservation status per the IUCN as a least concern species. Despite some local decreases and extinctions, the Ural owl has been aided in central Europe by reintroductions.

== Description ==
Video of Ural owl in Kõrvemaa, Estonia (April 2022)

Like most Strix species, it has a broad, rounded head with a correspondingly round facial disc, barring a tiny V-shaped indentation. The Ural owl has, for an owl, an exceptionally long tail that bears a wedge-shaped tip. In colour, it tends to be a plain pale greyish-brown to whitish overall (with more detailed description of their variation under subspecies), with a slightly darker grey-brown to brown back and mantle with contrasting whitish markings. The underparts are pale cream-ochre to grey-brown and are boldly (though sometimes more subtly) overlaid with dark brown streaking, without crossbars. Many variations are known in overall plumage colour both at the subspecies level and the individual level. However, the Ural owl usually appears as a rather pale grey-brown owl, usually lacking in the warmer, richer colour tones of many other Strix owls, with distinct streaking below. In flight, a Ural owl shows a largely buffish-white underwing marked with heavy dark bars around the trailing edge and tip, while the long white tipped tail often appears slung downwards. Their flight style is reminiscent of a buzzard, but with deeper, more relaxed wing beats, with their style of flight often giving the appearance of quite a large bird. The eyes are dark brown, being relatively small and closely set to each other, which is opined to give them a less "fierce" countenance than that of a great grey owl (Strix nebulosa). The eyes are reminiscent of an almond in both shape and colour. The bill is yellowish, with a dirty yellow cere. Meanwhile, the tarsi and toes are covered in greyish feathering and the talons are yellowish brown with darker tips.

The Ural owl is a rather large species. Full-grown specimens range in total length from 50 to 64 cm (20 to 25 in), which may render them as roughly the eight longest owl species in the world (though many owls are heavier on average). Wingspan can vary in the species from 110 to 134 cm (3 ft 7 in to 4 ft 5 in). Like most birds of prey, the Ural owl displays reverse sexual dimorphism in size, with the female averaging slightly larger than the male. Reportedly talon size and body mass is the best way to distinguish the two sexes of Ural owl other than behavioral dichotomy based on observations in Finland. Weight is variable through the European part of the range. Males have been known to weigh from 451 to 1,050 g (0.994 to 2.315 lb) and females have been known to weigh from 569 to 1,454 g (1.254 to 3.206 lb). Voous estimated the typical weight of males and females at 720 g (1.59 lb) and 870 g (1.92 lb), respectively. It is one of the larger species in the Strix genus, being about 25% smaller overall than the great grey owl, the latter certainly being the largest of extant Strix species in every method of measurement. Body masses reported for some of the more southerly Asian species such as brown wood owl (S. leptogrammica) and spotted wood owl (S. seloputo) (as well as the similarly sized but unweighed mottled wood owl (S. ocellata)) show that they broadly overlap in body mass with the Ural owl or are even somewhat heavier typically despite being somewhat smaller in length, being somewhat stockier in build yet shorter tailed than the Ural owl. Despite having no published weights for adults, Père David's owl (S. davidi) seems to also be of a similar size to the Ural owl as well. Among standard measurements, in both sexes, wing chord can measure from 267 to 400 mm (10.5 to 15.7 in) across the range and tail length can from 201 to 320 mm (7.9 to 12.6 in). Among extant owls, only the great grey owl is certain to have a longer tail. Though less frequently measured, the tarsus may range from 44 to 58.5 mm (1.73 to 2.30 in) and, in northern Europe, the total bill length measured from 38 to 45 mm (1.5 to 1.8 in). The foot span can regularly reach around 14.3 cm (5.6 in) in full-grown owls.

=== Vocalizations and ear morphology ===
Ural owl male and female territorial calls.

The song of the male is a deep rhythmic series of notes with a short pause after the first two notes, variously transcribed as wohu... huw-huhuwo or huow-huow-huow. The phrase repeats at intervals of several seconds. The male's song may carry up to 2 km (1.2 mi) to human perception but usually is considered not quite that far-carrying. Peak singing times in Finland during springtime are 10 pm-12 am and more intensely at 1-3 am, which differed from the peak times for nest visits. The female has a similar but hoarser and slightly higher pitched song, giving it a more "barking" quality. Not infrequently, Ural owls will duet during courtship. In addition, a deep, hoarse heron-like kuwat or korrwick is probably used as a contact call. These are more elongated and harsher than the kewick note made by tawny owls (S. aluco). Young beg with hoarse chrrreh calls, again similar to the ones by young tawny owls but deeper. Vocal behavior tends to peak in early spring until the young leave the nest, most often during incubation and nesting in the form of prey delivery countercalling. The alarm call, which is typically delivered during territorial rounds, of the male is coincidentally analogous to the territorial song of the short-eared owl (Asio flammeus), which is considered a somewhat hollow sounding hoot. The alarm call is audible at up to 1,500 m (4,900 ft) away. The Ural owl also has a particularly menacing bill-snapping display. In total, Swedish biologist reported that about nine different calls were uttered by Ural owls. Despite the range of calls, the species is generally very quiet for a large owl and may not vocalize even at peak times for perhaps up to nearly 2 days.

The ears of the Ural owl are quite large, averaging about 24 mm (0.94 in) on the left and 27 mm (1.1 in) on the right with the pre-aural dermal flap measuring about 13 mm (0.51 in). In fact their ears are amongst the largest recorded in owls. In combination with their large ears, the well-developed facial disc shows the importance of sound to hunting to this and other owl who hunt in boreal zones. While the Ural owl was found to be aurally overdeveloped compared to other Strix such as the barred owl (S. varia) it was found to be underdeveloped in comparison to owls more confined to true boreal type habitats, like the great grey owl and the boreal owl (Aegolius funereus).

=== Confusion with similar owl species ===
The Ural owl is a fairly distinctive looking bird but can be confused for other owls, especially with others in the Strix genus. The extralimital North American barred owl appears quite similar, the main feature differentiating the two being the Ural owl does not have concentric lines on its facial plate. The tawny owl is much smaller with a conspicuously shorter tail and a relatively larger head. The tawny species, which occurs variously in grey, brown and red morphs, has underparts with dark shaft-streaks and crossbars, as opposed to the heavy but straight streaking of the Ural owl. The great grey owl is larger than the Ural owl with a huge head and relatively even smaller yellow eyes while their facial disc has strong concentric lines. In colour, the great grey is distinctly more solidly uniform and somewhat dark greyish than the Ural owl. An unlikely species to mistake a Ural owl is the Eurasian eagle-owl (Bubo bubo) which is much larger (by a considerable margin the heaviest and longest winged owl in Europe) with prominent ear tufts, a squarish (not rounded) head shape and orange eyes as well as with distinctly different markings. Long-eared owls (Asio otus) are much smaller and slimmer, with prominent ear-tufts, orange eyes and more prominent dark markings. More similar than any in Europe, the closely related Père David's owl does not occur in the same range as (other?) Ural owls but is darker in plumage, also with a facial disc marked with darker concentric lines. Due to its partially diurnal behaviour during warmer months, some authors consider it confusable with the very different looking (but similarly largish and long-tailed) Eurasian goshawk (Astur gentilis).

== Taxonomy ==
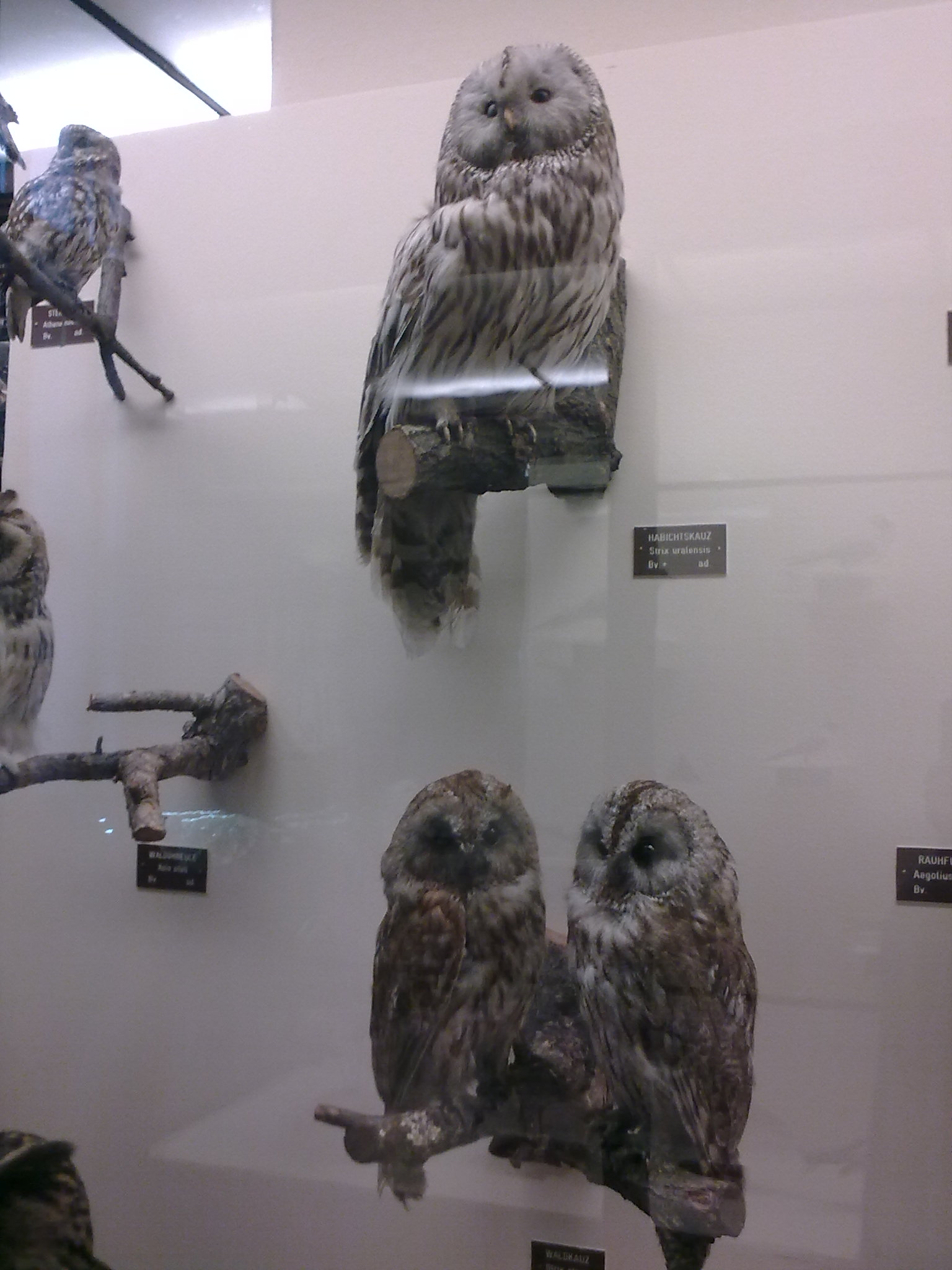
A taxidermed specimen of Ural owl near a pair of its close cousin, the tawny owl

The Ural owl was named by Peter Simon Pallas in 1771 as Strix uralensis, due to the type specimen having been collected in the Ural Mountains. While the Urals fall around the middle of the species' distribution, some authors such as Karel Voous lamented that a more broadly appropriate than Ural owl was not derived for the English common name. In other languages, the species is referred to as Slaguggla, or "attacking owl", in Swedish, Habichtskauz, or "goshawk-owl", in German or as the "long-tailed owl" in Russian. The Ural owl is a member of the Strix genus, which are quite often referred to as wood owls. Conservatively, about 18 species are currently represented in this genus, typically being medium to large sized owls, characteristically round-headed and lacking ear tufts, which acclimate to living in forested parts of various climatic zones. Four owls native to the neotropics are sometimes additionally included with the Strix genus but some authorities have also included these in a separate but related genus, Ciccaba. Strix owls have an extensive fossil record and have long been widely distributed. The genetic relationship of true owls is somewhat muddled and different genetic testings has variously indicated that Strix owls are related to disparate appearing genera like Pulsatrix, Bubo and Asio.

The tawny owl is thought to be a close relative of the Ural owl. Authors have hypothesized that the origin of the species divide followed Pleistocene continental glaciations segregated a southwest or southern group in temperate forest (i.e. the tawny) from an eastern one inhabiting cold, boreal ranges (i.e. the Ural). The species pattern is mirrored in other bird species, i.e. the European green woodpecker (Picus viridus) from the more northern transcontinental grey-headed woodpecker (P. canus). After retreat of the continental ice masses, the ranges more recently penetrated each other. While the life history details of the tawny and Ural owls are largely corresponding, nonetheless the species have a number of morphological differences and are largely adapted to different climates, times of activity and habitats. Based on Strix fossil species from Middle Pleistocene (given the name S. intermedia) in variously the Czech Republic, Austria and Hungary show from leg and wing bones indicate an animal of intermediate form and size between Ural and tawny owls. However, fossils of a larger and differently proportioned Strix owl than a tawny owl, identified as S. brevis, from Germany and Hungary from before the Pleistocene (i.e. Piacenzian) and as well as diagnosed Ural owl fossils from disparate southerly deposits in Sardinia from the Early Pleistocene and in Middle Pleistocene deposits in the Pannonian Basin as well as much later during the early Holocene from far to the west in Belgium, France and Switzerland suggest a more complicated evolutionary and distributional history. A hybrid was recorded in captivity between a male Ural and a female tawny owl, which managed to produce two offspring that were intermediate in size and had a more complex song that was also shared some characteristics with both species' vocalizations.

Some species in America, such as namely the barred owl, are at times thought to be so closely related as well to the extreme that the Ural and barred and spotted owls (S. occidentalis), have been considered to potentially be part of a species complex or even within the same species. However, there is no evidence nor likelihood that the Strix owls between America and Eurasia ever formed a continuous population given their adaptation to well-forested areas as well as the fact that the barred owl is more ecologically similar to the more generalized tawny owl, despite being of intermediate size between tawny and Ural owls (closer in size to the latter), and that the tawny does not range anywhere close to the boundary between North America and Russia as does the Ural. Certainly the most ambiguous aspect of the relations of Ural owl is the Père David's owl which has both historically and currently been considered either an isolated subspecies of the Ural owl or a distinct species. It is thought that the Père David's is likely a glacial relict of the mountainous forest of western China where plant and animal life often remain reminiscent of pre-glacial life. Recent study has indicated that the Père David's owl is valid species based on appearance, voice, and life history differences, though genetic studies have shown a somewhat muddled diversity between races of the Ural owls species complex. It has been recognized by The Clements Checklist of Birds of the World but BirdLife International and IUCN still classify it as a subspecies of the Ural owl.

=== Subspecies ===
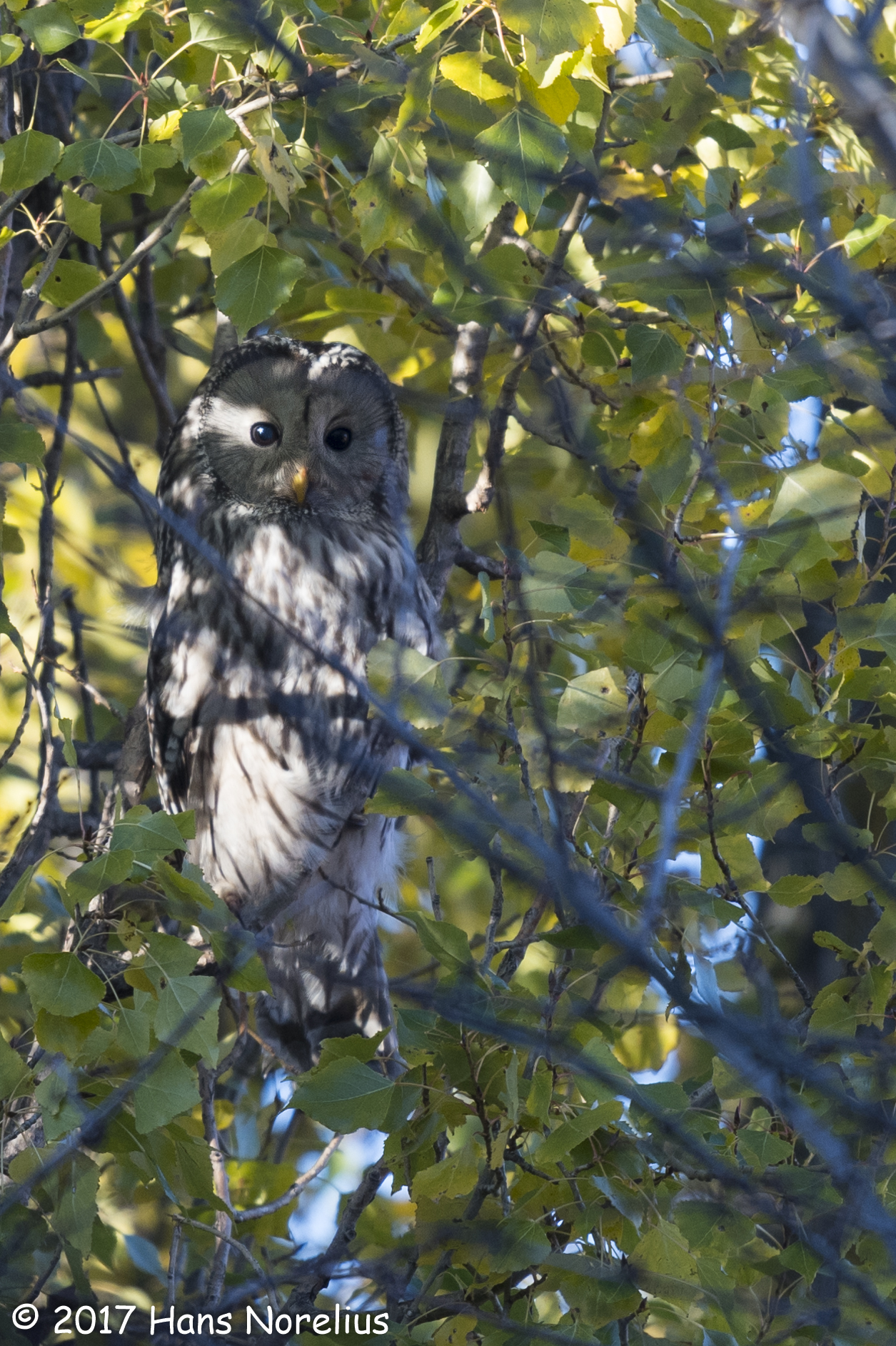
An adult of the well-streaked but otherwise pale subspecies S. u. liturata that is widespread in Europe, seen here in Sweden.

At least as many as 15 subspecies have been recognized by some authorities though some feel that there may be as few eight valid subspecies. Study of the phylogeographic genetics of Ural owls in Europe showed that they occur in about 5 distinct genetic clusters that do not correspond as well as expected to subspecies, and further that genetic exchange is considerable where subspecies ranges abut. The phylogeographic data indicates a continuous population in not the too distant history and discredits general classification of the species as a glacial relict, with isolation of populations likely being largely related to human interference.

- S. u. uralensis (Pallas, 1771)- This is the nominate subspecies, thought to be found in the inland part of the Russian Far East, Siberia to Yakutia and Okhotsk Coast south to Middle Volga, southern Ural, Tyumen and Yalutorovsky. The wing chord of males is 334 to 375 mm (13.1 to 14.8 in) whilst that of females is 348 to 380 mm (13.7 to 15.0 in). A small sample of males weighed 500 to 712 g (1.102 to 1.570 lb) while one female weighed 950 g (2.09 lb). Light and dark morphs occur in the nominate race, the former being much more numerous. This subspecies is likely the palest form of Ural owl, with some Siberian owls so completely whitish and faintly marked as to momentarily suggest a snowy owl (Bubo scandianus). The typical light morph has facial disc of dirty whitish to pale ochraceous-grey colour, while the rim around disc consists of rows of small dark spots. The upperparts are pale greyish-brown, mottled, spotted and streaked variously with whitish and dusky and the scapulars have a rather large area of white. The throat is whitish, while the remaining underside is very pale greyish-brown to dirty whitish with heavy but not dark brown streaking. The tarsi and toes are feathered in a pale greyish-brown to dirty whitish-cream colour.
- S. u. davidi (Sharpe, 1875)- The Père David's owl. It is found in the mountains of central China (Qinghai and Sichuan). There is debate over whether it is a separate species or an isolated subspecies of Ural owl.
- S. u. liturata (Tengmalm, 1795)- This race is found in northern Europe from eastern Norway, Lapland and elsewhere in Sweden, throughout the range in Finland, to the Baltic region (mainly northern Belarus), eastern Poland, the eastern Alps down, the easternmost Carpathian Mountains, east to the Volga. Birds of this race sometimes intergrade in the eastern part of the range with the nominate subspecies. Wing chord of males is 342 to 368 mm (13.5 to 14.5 in) and in females is 349 to 382 mm (13.7 to 15.0 in). Tail length is 253 to 282 mm (10.0 to 11.1 in). Known body masses have been reported as 451 to 900 g (0.994 to 1.984 lb) in males. Despite being linearly smaller than S. u. macroura, a large sample of female Ural owls in Finland showed that they were surprisingly some 16% heavier than those in Romania, with 542 averaging 1,031 g (2.273 lb), with a range of 785 to 1,350 g (1.731 to 2.976 lb). Some females of the subspecies though may weigh as little as 520 g (1.15 lb) and, unlike the Ural owl species overall, may show some level of compliance to Bergmann's rule. This race is fairly similar in appearance to the nominate form but averages a fair bit darker, with richer, darker brown streaking below in most birds that extends to the bottom rim of the facial disc and typically less extensive white spotting and mottling about the back and mantle.
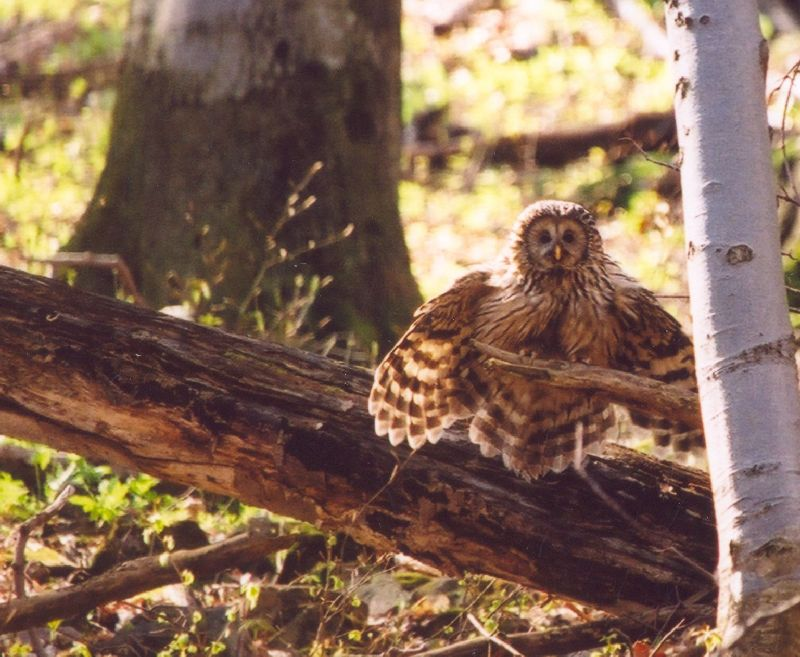
  A Ural owl of the large, dark and richly coloured race, S. u. macroura, as seen in Slovakia
- S. u. macroura (Wolf, 1810)- This race, which comes close but is usually found in different areas than S. u. liturata is native to the western Carpathians, Transylvanian Alps and south to the West Balkans. In both sexes the wing chord may range from 354 to 415 mm (13.9 to 16.3 in). Tail length is 282 to 315 mm (11.1 to 12.4 in). Going on linear measurements, this is the largest bodied race of Ural owl, despite having the most southerly range of any race in Europe. In Romania, 40 males weighed an average of 706 g (1.556 lb), with a range of 503 to 950 g (1.109 to 2.094 lb), and 57 females weighed an average of 863 g (1.903 lb), with a range of 569 to 1,307 g (1.254 to 2.881 lb). However, both individual males and females that were heavier than the largest in the above sample are known for this race. This is probably the darkest coloured of Ural owl races. A typical adult is covered in a brownish ochraceous on the facial disc and the underside, which also has very broad and blackish streaking. Meanwhile, in a typical bird the back is a dark grey-brown which make the white portions on the wings stand in contrast. Dark morphs are also not infrequent. In a sample of 522 S. u. macroura, 11.7% were dark morphs, while previously it was estimated that only about 6% were dark morphs. Locally, even as many as 15% of birds may be dark morphs. Dark morphs are a rich, dark chocolate brown overall, especially on the facial disc. The mantle of dark morphs is dark coffee brown with mildly different grey-brown streaking, lacking the white spots seen on this area on other Ural owls. The underside usually show dark chocolate brown streaks over a mid-brown base colour.
- S. u. yenisseensis (Buturlin, 1915)- This race is found in the Central Siberian Plateau to Transbaikal and northwestern Mongolia but they are mainly recorded as winter vagrants in the latter two areas. The wing chord of males is 328 to 350 mm (12.9 to 13.8 in) while in females it is 348 to 370 mm (13.7 to 14.6 in). Tail length is from 235 to 282 mm (9.3 to 11.1 in). This race is fairly similar to the nominate subspecies but is typically a little less whitish overall and typically overall much smaller than it as well as most European Ural owls. Hybrids between this and the nominate subspecies are known to occur.
- S. u. nikolskii (Buturlin, 1907)- According to some authorities, this race includes previously recognized subspecies of S. u. daurica, S. u. taibanai and S. u. corrensis. This race is found in Transbaikal north and east to Vitim, Sakhalin and south to the Korean Peninsula. This race is quite small, being smaller than all races to the west of it and only mildly larger than the Ural owls of Japan. The wing chord of males is 293 to 335 mm (11.5 to 13.2 in) and that of females is 317 to 355 mm (12.5 to 14.0 in). One male weighed 630 g (1.39 lb) while a small sample of females weighed 608 to 842 g (1.340 to 1.856 lb). More so than other Russian subspecies, this race is similar to S. u. liturata in Europe but distantly separated in distribution. Compared to that race as well as the sometimes overlapping S. u. yenisseensis, in S. u. nikolskii the head, nape and shoulders typically have a brownish colour (suggesting a cape) which is contrasted more strongly with the whiter light areas.
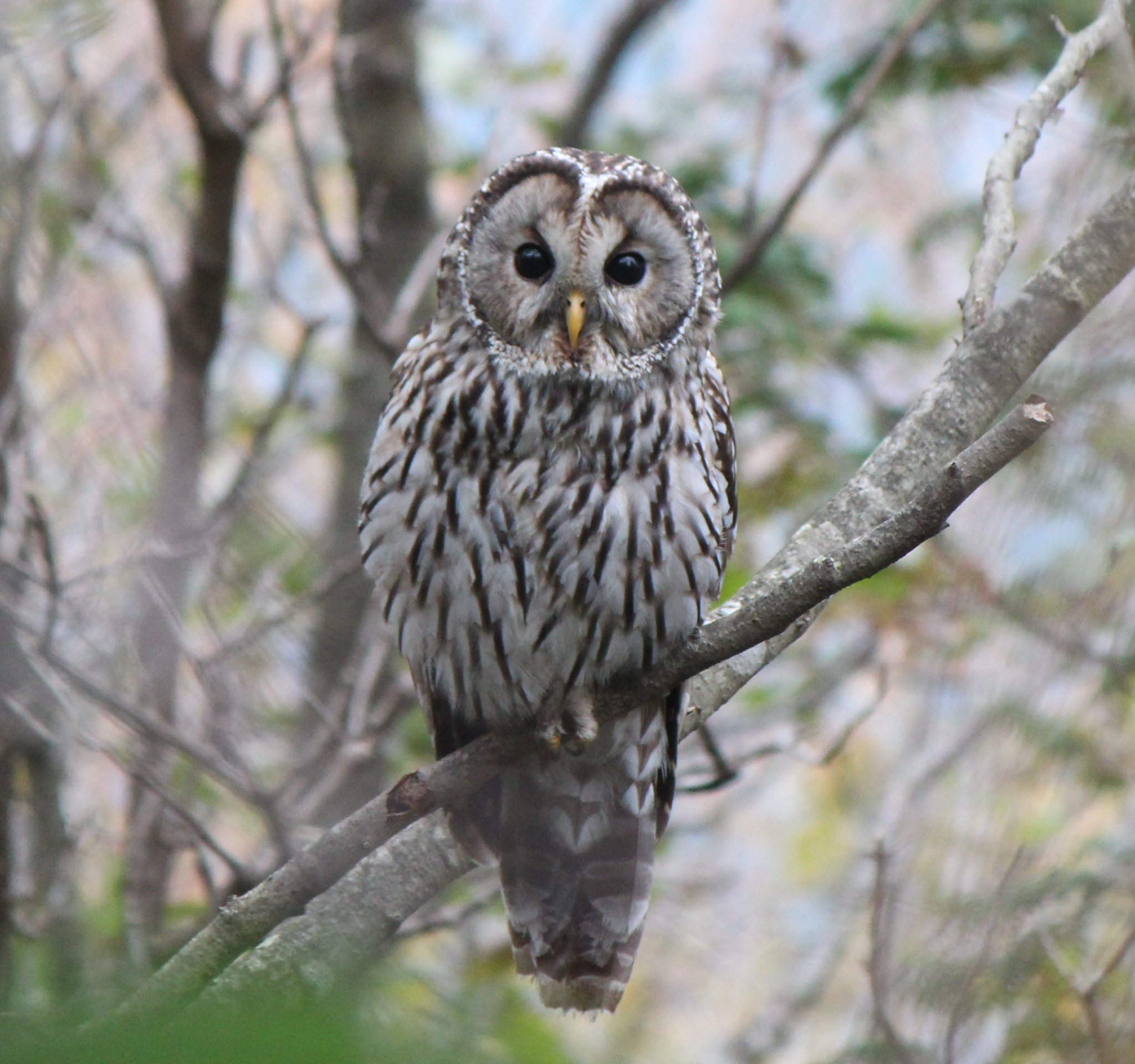
  In the region of Mount Chausu, a Ural owl of the race S. u. fuscescens
- S. u. fuscescens (Temminck & Schlegel, 1847)- This Japanese race is found from western and southern Honshu to Kyushu. This race is quite small. Despite being sometimes opined as the smallest race, it appears to be slightly larger than the Ural owls found in Hokkaido. The wing chord of males is 301 to 311 mm (11.9 to 12.2 in) and that of females is 315 to 332 mm (12.4 to 13.1 in). The upperparts are marked with a distinct yellowish rufescent-brown colour. Meanwhile, the underparts are yellowish rusty with dark brown streaks and often are overlaid with rounded white spots. The feathering of the toes and tarsi are solidly brownish.
- S. u. hondoensis (Clark 1907)- This race may include S. u. japonica. If it includes japonica, this race is found throughout Hokkaido down through northern and central Honshu. Quite to the contrary of Bergmann's rule, northern owls in Hokkaido are the smallest ones, and indeed the smallest known in the entire Ural owl species, while southerly owls are slightly larger. Otherwise birds from the different islands are similar in appearance. The wing chord of males is 249 to 322 mm (9.8 to 12.7 in) and that of females is 295 to 347 mm (11.6 to 13.7 in). Tail length in Hokkaido is 201 to 235 mm (7.9 to 9.3 in) while in Honshu it is 220 to 244 mm (8.7 to 9.6 in). Compared to other Japanese birds (i.e. S. u. fuscescens) and indeed most other races is of a rather rusty brown colour overall, while most individuals show little to no white speckling on the head, back and mantle.

== Distribution ==
The Ural owl has a large distribution. In mainland Europe, its modern distribution is quite spotty, with the species being found in central Europe in southeastern Germany, central and eastern areas of the Czech Republic, southern Austria, all but western Slovenia, and spottily but broadly in several areas of western, southern and northeastern Poland. The distribution in Germany is particularly nebulous (and perhaps aided by reintroductions branching from the well-known Bavarian population), with evidence of Ural owls apparently residing (and possibly nesting) considerably away from currently known haunts in Egge far to the west and mysteriously turning up rather to the north in Harz and Lüneburg Heath. In eastern Europe, the species is found in eastern Croatia, Bosnia and Herzegovina, western Serbia, montane west-central Bulgaria, montane central Romania, much of Slovakia, southwestern Ukraine, southern and eastern Lithuania, northern Belarus, eastern Latvia and much of Estonia. In Scandinavia, its distribution is quite broad, though it is only found in southeastern part of Norway, as Ural owls may be found ranging across most of Sweden and Finland but is absent from the northern stretches as well as southern Sweden (largely the peninsular area). Its range in Russia is extensive but it is absent from areas where habitat is not favorable. In western and European Russia, it is found as far south roughly as the Bryansk, Moscow and northern Samara north continuously to Kaliningrad, the southern part of the Kola Peninsula and Arkhangelsk. In the eponymous Ural region, it is found from roughly Komi south to Kamensk-Uralsky. In the general area of Siberia, the Ural owl is found widely discontinuing its typical range in the foothills of the Altai Mountains to the west and being found north roughly as far as Batagay in the east. The species' distribution is continuous to the Russian Far East to as far as Okhotsk Coast and Magadan, Khabarovsk Krai and Sakhalin. Out of Russia, the range of the Ural owl continues into northeastern Mongolia, Northeastern China inland nearly as far as Beijing and down to Shandong and throughout the Korean Peninsula. The Ural owl is also distributed through all five of the main islands of Japan (i.e. only absent from Okinawa/Ryukyu Islands to the south). Vagrancy has been reported in Europe and Russia, which may account for sightings of the species almost throughout Germany. Furthermore, 16 records exist of the species in northern Italy.

== Habitat ==
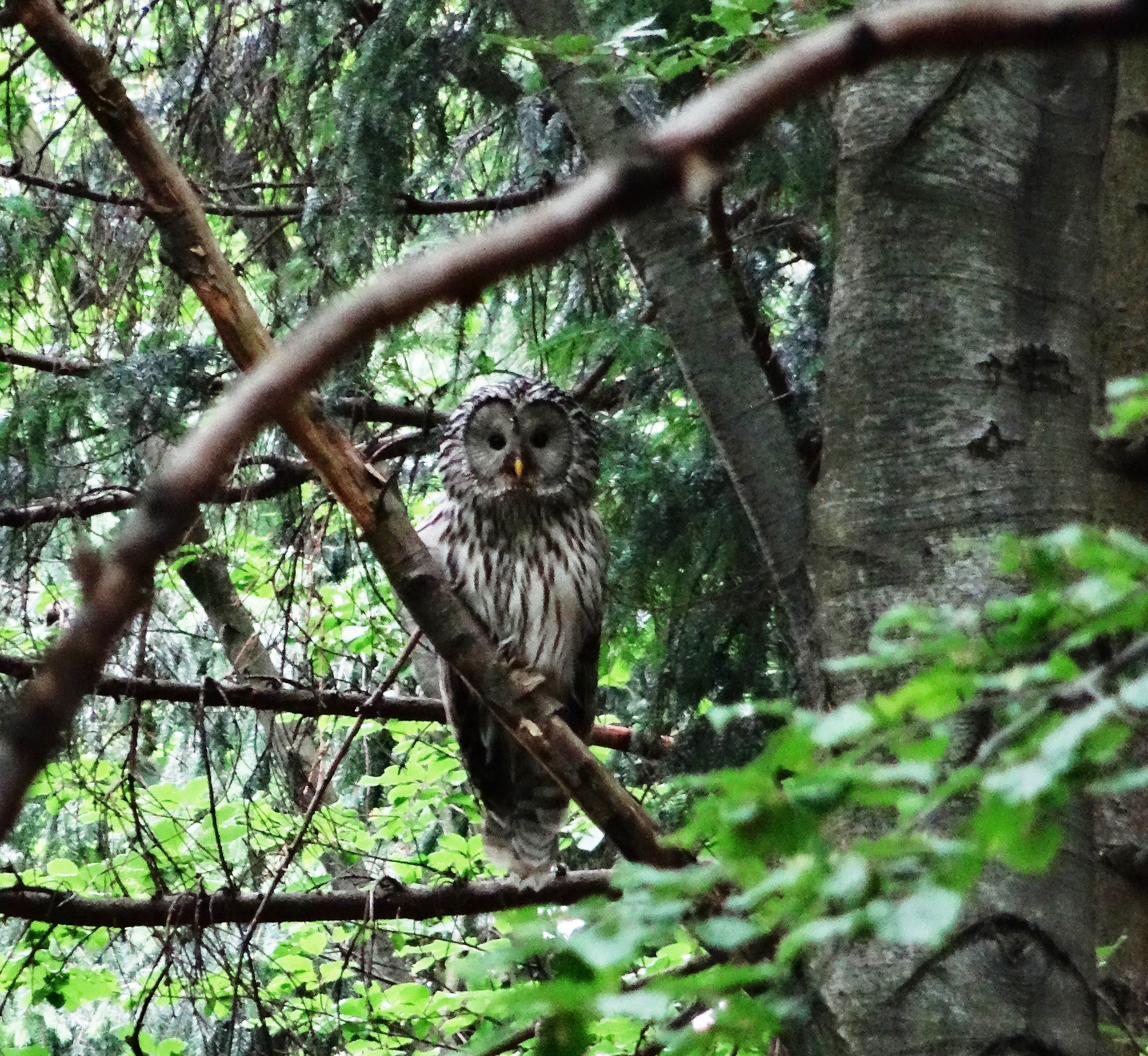
Ural owls often prefer well-wooded areas with large, mature trees

Ural owls tend to occur in mature but not too dense primary forest, which can variously be in coniferous, mixed or deciduous areas. Normally, they prefer to be close to an opening. These are often compromised by forest bogs with wet ground underfoot is overgrown by a mixture of spruce, alder and/or birch or by damp heathland with scattered trees. Predominant trees in much of the range are often spruce, fir and pine forests in north and alder, beech and birch with mixtures of the above conifers in the south. Quite often they are adapted to high elevation forest in mountains, but in remote wildlands they can adapt equally well to areas down to sea level.

In the Carpathian Mountains, they tend to favor almost exclusively beech-dominated forests, normally at elevations of 250 to 450 m (820 to 1,480 ft) above sea level. Forest characteristics of these beech-dominated woods showed that during forest management showed they need at least 100 ha (250 acres) of woods to persist, with parts of the forests needing to be at least 45–60 years old. Carpathian Ural owls typically occur far from human habitations and woodland edge not surrounded by forest and typically avoid parts of the forest with steep slopes or with dense undergrowth. Carpathian birds often preferred areas with glades that bear gaps between the trees often around 25 m (82 ft) or so and usually with plentiful broken trees. Young, post-dispersal owls in the Carpathians birds show less strong habitat preferences and may utilized wooded corridors that often are connected to remaining ideal habitat areas. Reportedly the countries of Slovakia, Slovenia then Romania have the most extensive ideal habitat in the Carpathians and thus have the highest local densities of Ural owls, perhaps in all of Europe. Forest predominant in beech were also seemingly preferred by the reintroduced Ural owls in Bavarian Forest, again with old growth preferred with plentiful sun exposure. Bavarian owls occurred in areas that were also often rich in large mammals since their preference for access to parts of the forest with broken trees and openings often coincided. Further north in Latvia, forests inhabited were usually far older than was prevalent in the regional environment, usually with a preference for forest areas with trees at least 80 years old. Finnish populations apparently most often occur in spruce dominated forest, usually having discreetly segregated forest preferences apart from sympatric species of owls except for the boreal owl, which also preferred spruce areas but occurred more regularly when the dominant Ural owls are scarce. In the taiga of western Finland, it was found that biodiversity was consistently higher in the vicinity of Ural owl nests than outside these vicinities, rendering the Ural owl as perhaps a "keystone species" for the local ecosystem. Riverine forests with birch and poplar are often utilized in the taiga as well as spruce or fir forests (montane taiga) in the Ussuri river area. Generally in northern climes such as Finland and western Russia, wherein the Lapland area the Ural owl is likely to reach the northernmost part of its range, it is adaptive to Subarctic areas possibly up to the tree line but does not adapt as well as the great grey owl to areas of dwarf forest just south of the tundra, generally needing taller, more mature forests to the south of this.

Historically, they normally occur in remote, little disturbed areas far from human habitations. The Ural owl is largely restricted from areas where forest fragmentation has occurred or park-like settings are predominant, as opposed to the smaller, more adaptive tawny owl which acclimates favorably to such areas. On the contrary, in some peri-urbanized areas of Russia, such as the metropolitan parks and gardens so long as habitat is favorable and encouraging of prey populations, the Ural owl has been known to successfully occur. Some towns and cities whose region hold some populations of Ural owls are Chkalov, Kirov, Perm, Barnaul, Krasnoyarsk and Irkutsk, and even sometimes Leningrad and Moscow. Changes in nesting habits due to the erection of nest boxes has almost allowed Ural owls to nest unusually close to human habitations in the western part of the range, especially in Finland. An exceptional record of synanthropization in this species for Europe was recorded in Košice, Slovakia where a 10-15 year apparent increase of an unknown number of owls have been observed between the months of November and June. At least one Ural owl was recorded to habituate the city of Ljubljana in Slovenia but there was no evidence it was able to breed or establish a territory given the limited nature of woodlands in the vicinity.

== Behaviour ==
The Ural owl is often considered nocturnal with peaks of activity at dusk and just before dawn. However, taken as a whole and since it mainly lives the taiga zone where very long summer days are the norm against extensive dark during the winter, Ural owls are not infrequently fully active during daylight hours during the warmer months, while brooding young. Presumably during winter, they are mostly active during the night. Thus, the species may be more correctly classified as cathemeral as is much of their main prey. The wide range of activity times, and partial adaption to daytime activity, is further indicated by the relatively small eyes that the species possesses. This contrasts strongly with the tawny owl, which almost always fully nocturnal. During the day, Ural owls may take rests on a roost, which is most typically a branch close to trunk of a tree or in dense foliage. Normally, Ural owls are not too shy and may be approached quite closely. Historically, European birdwatchers often consider the species to be rather elusive and hard to observe. However, as the species as acclimated to nest boxes closer to areas where humans frequent, especially in Fennoscandia, encounters have increased sharply.

=== Territoriality and movements ===
The Ural owl is a highly territorial and residential species that, as a rule, tends to stay on the same home range throughout the year. While most boreal owls, such as great grey owl and boreal owl, are generally given to nomadism and irruptive movements, with nearly the entire population following the population cycle of their primary prey, the Ural owl rarely departs from its home range even when prey populations decrease. Apart from the great grey species, like the Ural, most species in the Strix genus of owls are both highly territorial and non-migratory. Territories are generally maintained with songs, most often uttered by the male of the resident pair. This is quite the norm for owls in almost every part of the world. Due probably to its natural scarcity, very few firsthand accounts are known of territorial fights between adults but they presumably occur as Ural owls can be quite aggressive owls (or are at least in the context of protecting their nests). However, according to a study in southern Poland, Ural owls are generally less aggressive in the non-breeding seasons than are tawny owls to other owls and may be slightly tolerant of smaller owl species on their home range while the tawny is less so. That the Ural is slightly less aggressively territorial than the tawny owl is also supported in a study from Slovenia when tawnys had more spirited calls to recorded calls and launched more aggressive attacks to the taxidermied specimens of Ural, boreal and owls of their own species than did the Ural owls to any of the same stated stimuli. As for movements, as opposed to the sedentary adults, immatures may wander distances of up to about 150 km (93 mi). An occasional individual may wander straggle even further and remain for some time in a wintering area. A small number of straggling young Ural owls may occur irregularly down in southeastern Europe outside of the typical range of the species. Some circumstantial evidence was reported of Ural owls moving downhill in mountains in Japan when snowfall was heavy. Siberian population shows somewhat southward movements in severe winters, as the number of prey animals plummets and the owls themselves face risk of freezing.

== Dietary biology ==
This is a fairly powerful species of owl. However, like owls of nearly all sizes, mostly it prefers to take small prey relative to itself, especially small mammals. In a great majority of dietary studies, somewhere between 50 and 95% of the food is mammalian. Prey consists mostly of various species of rodent, though shrews and, locally, moles can be a regular food source as well. In addition, any variety of small mammal, to the size of hares (albeit usually young ones), may too be fairly often taken, as well as variable numbers of birds, amphibians and invertebrates, with reptiles and perhaps fish being very rare prey. Across the wide distribution, the Ural owl is known to take more than 200 prey species, of which more than 80 are mammals. In a compilation study of the diet in three European study areas and four different years found that the mean prey body mass taken per nest was estimated to vary from 17.1 to 125 g (0.60 to 4.41 oz) with an average estimated at 43.83 g (1.546 oz).

Most hunting efforts are undertaken from a perch. They usually prefer prey that comes into open spots of the forest rather than those that frequent the forest floor. In Slovakia, in addition to glades and meadows near tall forests, Ural owls have been somewhat acclimated to hunting in open areas that are human sourced, including areas of forest fragmentation and even agricultural areas and small towns and villages if they are adjacent to mature forest patches. Little direct study has gone into the hunting methods of this predator. It is quite possible that is to some extent a still-hunter, perching for some time on a prominent tree until prey becomes apparent into the vicinity. However, in Scandinavia, Ural owls were reported to hunt more like goshawks rather than the more still-hunting tawny owls, with a perch-hunting method wherein they fly in brief spurts from perch to perch, with the flights meant to be inconspicuous until prey is detected. Ural owls are not known to attack prey from active flight, instead nearly always dropping down on it directly from its perch. In Japan, experimental studies of semi-captive Ural owls were undertaken to observe how the owls select which areas to hunt in and which prey to select. When experimentally exposed to patches where prey was present and patches where prey was not present, Ural owls would forage in both but would seem to learn which patches were more likely to have food and subsequently forage more extensively around them. When the same biologists observed the foraging patterns on field mice and also voles, they similarly learned and showed a preference for the patches that held larger species over smaller ones. On evidence, though prey selection is largely opportunistic, rodents at risk of starvation in the Japanese studies were more likely to risk foraging in relatively open spots of the ground, so therefore would be preferentially selected by the Ural owls. Based on the Japanese studies, Ural owls seem to be able to improve their resource utilization patterns as they accumulate experience within their environment. Different studies in Japan showed that the Ural owls are capable of hunting prey that is hiding in shallow snow or near the snow's surface during winter but voles hiding in the subnivean zone, ephemeral tunnels made under deep snow by the voles, are largely inaccessible to these owls. Surplus food may be stored at the nest or at nearby depots. The first verified record of scavenging on carrion was recorded when a Ural owl fed on the carcass of a roe deer (Capreolus capreolus), although an earlier record exists of a Ural owl visiting a wolf's kill (though it was not clear that the owl fed in that case).

=== Mammals ===
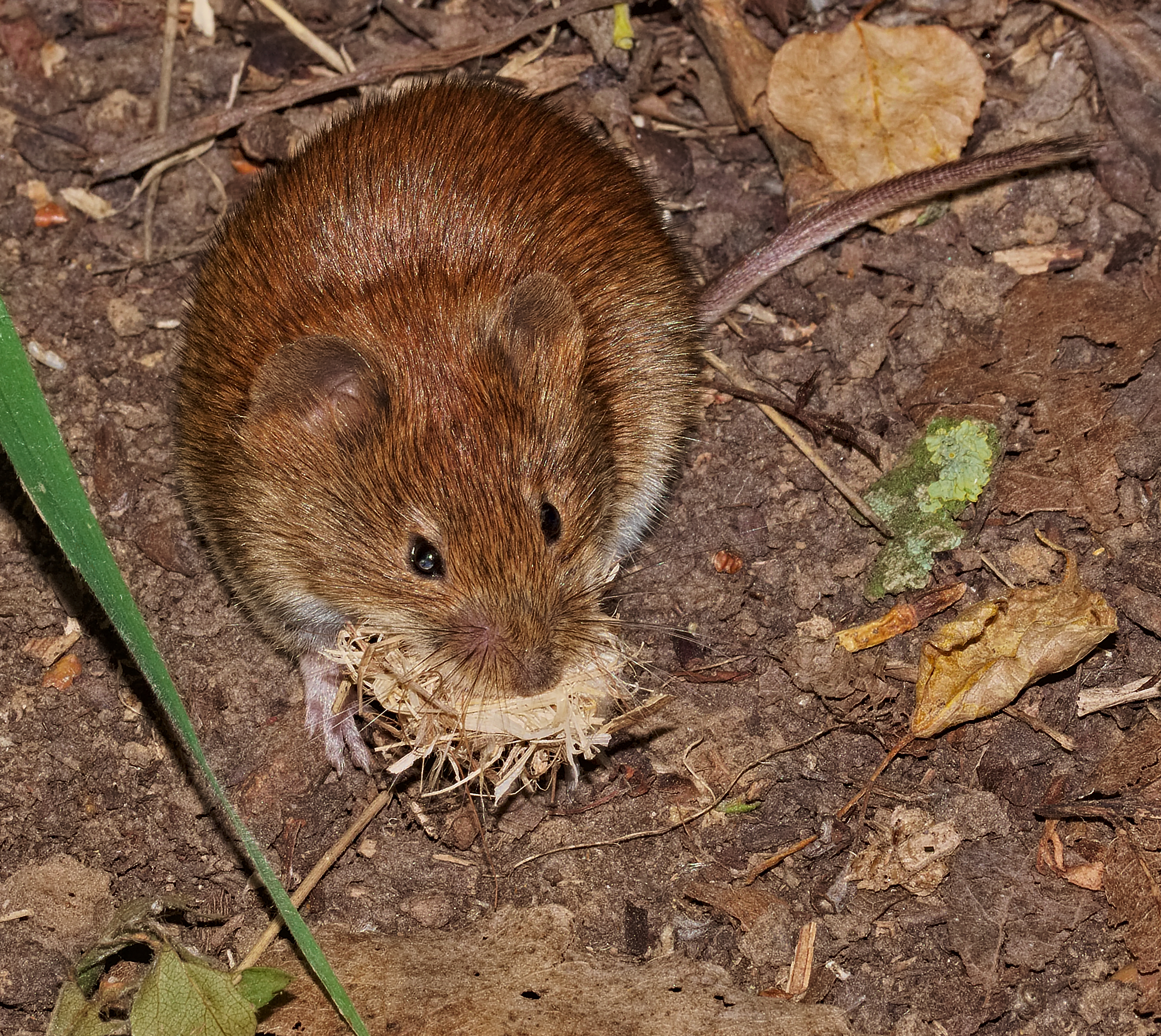
Vole species commonly taken as prey include the bank vole

Voles, small-to-medium-sized rodents with characteristically short tails, are often considered the most significant portion of the diet in almost every part of the distribution. Generally, in several parts to the west of their range, the Ural owl is associated with two vole prey species in particular, field voles (Microtus agrestis) and bank voles (Myodes glareolus). These voles tend to be solitary and fairly widely dispersed but habituate to favorable habitats for the Ural owls, such as the opener margins of extensive forested areas, and can quite numerous when vole populations peak. Per study in Finland, Ural owls took field and bank voles that averaged larger than the average weight of those captured in the field by biologist, i.e. the weight of those caught by owls was estimated at 28.59 g (1.008 oz) for field voles vs 26.44 g (0.933 oz) for bank voles, while those caught by biologists averaged 22.78 g (0.804 oz) for fields vs 18.75 g (0.661 oz) for banks. 56% of the field voles those caught by Ural owls were reproductively active, while 44% of bank voles were active as such. Helminths did not appear to make field voles more vulnerable to predation but male field voles were far more often caught by Ural owls than females, 76% of those caught in a study in Finland being male of those caught around vole nests, with 52% of the ones caught in fields being male. However, pregnant female field voles were found to be more vulnerable than other age female voles. More socially inclined and concentrated voles such as common voles (Microtus arvalis) tend to occur in more extensive open areas so forest-dwelling owls such as the Ural tend hunt them relatively scarcely, but only relative to many other predators. The largest known dietary study to date occurred in Finland, with 5995 prey items examined across several study years. According to this data, a much larger vole was preferred in the diet where available, the European water vole (Arvicola amphibius). With an estimated mean weight of 177 g (6.2 oz), the water vole constituted an estimated 22.15% of the prey by number and 52.2% of the biomass, against 19.5% by number and 18% of the biomass being made up by field voles. The average estimated prey weight overall within the study was estimated at 71.7 g (2.53 oz). Another, albeit smaller, central Finnish study showed field voles leading by number over water voles, 42.7% against 33.9%, among 1739 prey items respectively, but with the two species constituting 17.4% and 69.1% of the prey biomass. Southern Finnish studies showed sharp shifts in the import of vole prey due to their population cycles. In southern Finland, of 3351 prey items in a peak vole year, 58.43% by number and 42.8% by biomass of the prey was made of by field voles, followed by bank vole at 12.41% by number (but only 5.73% by biomass) and water voles at 22.24% by biomass (but only 10.1% by number). In the same study area during a poor vole year, amongst 860 prey items, voles trailed other prey such as birds and shrews by number, but water voles were taken more or less in the same numbers here as in the peak vole years. Another study estimated the mean weight of Finnish Ural owl prey as 78.1 g (2.75 oz). Similar dietary habits were found for Ural owls in Sweden, in 2309 prey items, water voles made up 33.1% of prey by number and 60% of the biomass, field voles composed 30.8% by number and 14.5% of the biomass and bank voles made up 11.8% of the prey by number and 3.3% of the biomass. Camera traps recording captured 187 prey items for Ural owls in 5 nests in Värmland County, Sweden found that voles were secondary in delivery rates to common shrew (Sorex araneus) and various birds with the small size of such prey requiring frequent deliveries although this was offset with fair numbers of young hares apparently available to these owls.

As the Ural owl ranges south, prey populations tend to become slightly less cyclical but also apparent access to large prey such as water vole appears to be reduced. In the relatively northerly Latvia, of 2615 prey items, voles constituted just over half the diet and the prey base was relatively diverse. For Latvian owls, the main prey species were bank vole (at 18.09% by number, 9.2% by biomass), field vole (17.13% by number, 13.85% by biomass) thence European mole (Talpa europaea) (9.83% by number, 12.3% biomass), the latter at a mature mass of about 90 g (3.2 oz). In Belarus, Microtus species were quite regular prey in vole peak years, at 45% by number and 29.9% biomass, against crash years when they were merely 6.7% by number and 4% by biomass while the less cyclical bank voles were 29% by number and 20.4% in biomass in peak years and 38.1% by number, 23.8% by biomass in crash years. Furthermore, in Belarus, shrews and moles went from 6.4% to 14.3% by number during the peak and crash years (biomass in crash years was 13.1% though only 2.2% of this was from shrews). In the Beskids of southwestern Poland, the mean prey mass of 1039 prey items was a quite low 27.5 g (0.97 oz) with the main prey species being the bank vole, making up an average of 27.7% of prey by number and 25% of the biomass (average estimated weight 24.3 g (0.86 oz)), common voles constituting on average 24.9% of the prey by number and 25.8% of biomass (average estimated weight 27.5 g (0.97 oz)), yellow-necked mouse (Apodemus flavicollis) on average 15.73% of prey number and 17.4% of biomass (average estimated weight 30 g (1.1 oz)) and European pine vole (Microtus subterraneus) at an average of 8.9% of the prey numbers and 5.8% biomass (average estimated weight 17.3 g (0.61 oz)). Outside of voles and field mice, other prey appears to be largely negligible in the Polish Beskids. In Slovakia, amongst 2134 prey items, the main prey species were the yellow-necked mouse (21.8%), common vole (18.3%), bank vole (14.3%), striped field mouse (Apodemus agrarius) (4.9%) and European pine vole (4.7%). In the reintroduced Ural owls of the Bavarian forest among a small sample of 117 prey items, similar small rodent types were appearing to be largely selected, such as Apodemus species (16.2%), field voles (15.3%), bank vole (13.6%) as well as unidentified voles. Diets of the Ural owls towards the southeast part of the Europe range have mainly been recorded in Slovenia. The broadest study found that of 1268 prey items, 45.9% of the diet was voles, particularly the bank vole (38.1% by number, 26.24% by biomass), with another 34.2% made up of by Apodemus species (as well as 28.2% of the biomass) and a large portion of dormice, especially the large edible dormouse (Glis glis), at 6% by number and 25.5% by biomass. More locally in a smaller block within Slovenia, up to 58.8% by number and 94.4% by biomass in the Ural owl's diet is compromised by the edible dormouse, whose adult body mass can vary from 62 to 340 g (2.2 to 12.0 oz).

Further east and out of Europe, the general reliance on small rodents for Ural owls is fairly consistent. In one of the most westerly studies, from Mordovia, Russia, of 426 prey items the main prey species were common voles (41.8%), bank voles (31.4%), tundra voles (Microtus oeconomus) (5.9%) and Ural field mouse (Apodemus uralensis) (3.1%). At five study sites in the Ural Mountains region, among 870 prey items, 75.2% were mammals. 29.54% of the diet in the Urals were bank vole, 16.55% were common vole, 5.52% were wood mouse (Apodemus sylvaticus) and 4.83% were unidentified Myodes voles. Further east, the general reliance on Myodes, also known collectively as red-backed voles, outside of the far-ranging bank vole seems to increase somewhat. Much further east in the Pacific coastal Primorsky Krai, 1163 total prey items were examined. Here rodents of similar character, though largely of different species, were largely taken by Ural owls, such as the northern red-backed vole (Myodes rutilus) (39.2% by number), reed vole (Microtus fortis) (24.24%), Apodemus sp. (9.7%), Korean field mouse (Apodemus peninsulae) (3.52%). In the isles of Japan, the smallish local races of Ural owls seem to assume the dietary generalist Strix owl ecological niche to some extent, in a similar way the tawny owl does to the west, however the primary portions of its diet are still assumed by many of the same prey genera taken elsewhere. In the Yatsugatake Mountains, 1,026 small mammals were identified at 17 Ural owl nest of which Apodemus species compromised 71%, followed by voles, at 24%, and Japanese shrew mole (Urotrichus talpoides), at 5%. In Koshimizu, Hokkaido, of 266 prey items from 111 total pellets, the diet led by grey red-backed vole (Myodes rufocanus) (25.2%), large Japanese field mouse (Apodemus speciosus) (17.7%), and small Japanese field mouse (Apodemus argenteus) (15.8%).

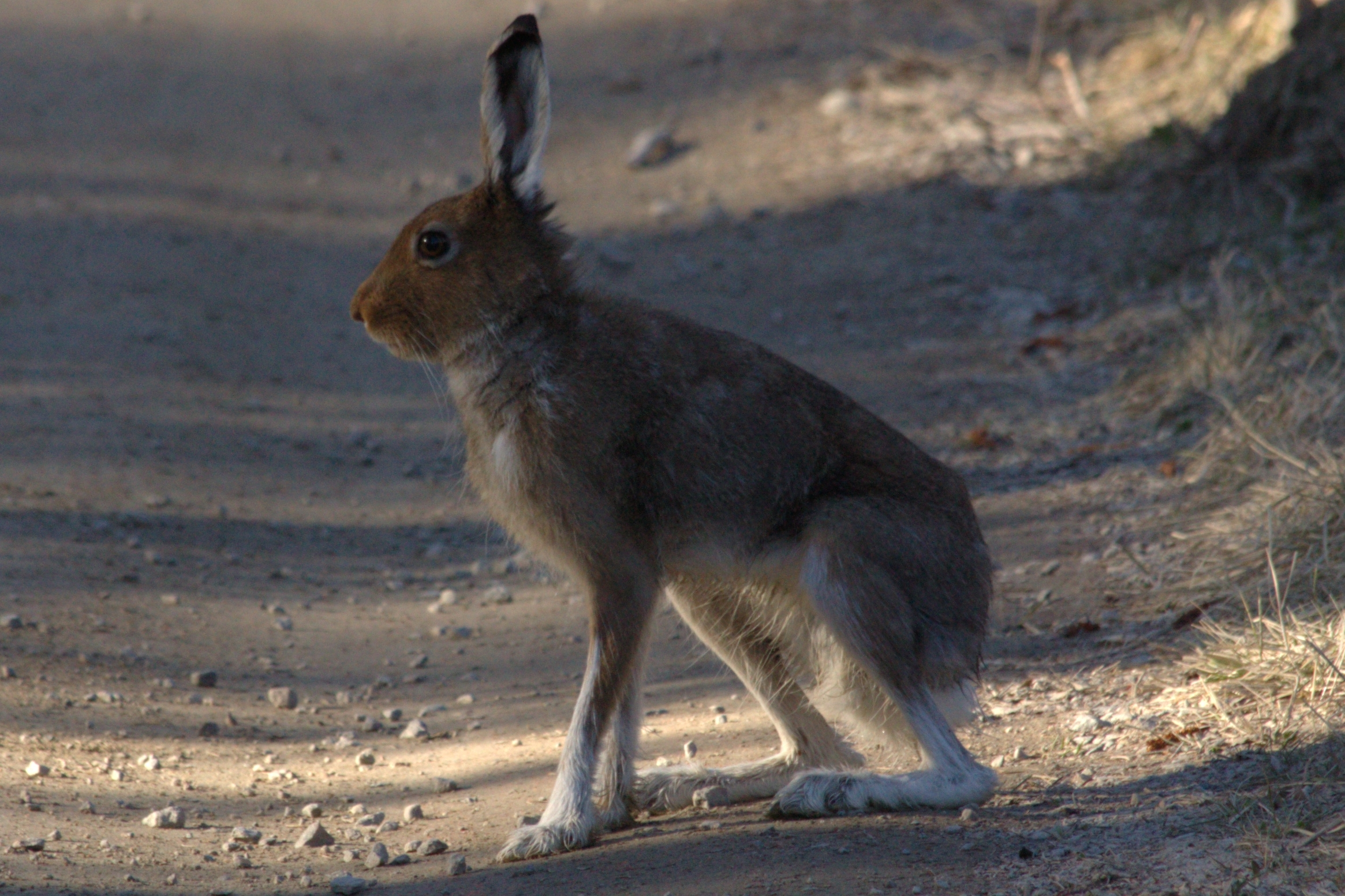
Although not common as prey, a young mountain hare can be productive prey for a Ural owl

Shrews of nearly 20 species are taken more or less throughout the Ural owl's range. Although not significant typically in the prey mass for the owls, the taking of shrews may allow the owls to stave off hunger. The smallest mammal and vertebrate prey known to be taken by Ural owls is the Eurasian least shrew (Sorex minutissimus), which has a median adult body mass of about 2.5 g (0.088 oz). Other small mammals taken normally in rather low volume by Ural owls are bats, flying squirrels and weasels. Larger mammals are taken as well by Ural owls, and can be considered occasional supplemental prey despite often being significant in the prey biomass. The species takes mammalian prey larger than the typical voles and mice far less so than in larger owls such as eagle-owls. Among these are a few species of squirrel, most of which weigh more than 200 g (7.1 oz) as adults, in Europe exclusively the far-ranging red squirrel (Sciurus vulgaris), as well as rats, especially the 300 g (11 oz) brown rat (Rattus norvegicus) which made up nearly 20% of the diet in a Hokkaido study. Adult hedgehogs of a couple species are opportunistically taken at times in Europe and European hedgehogs (Erinaceus europaeus) taken in Finland were estimated to average about 652 g (1.437 lb). Introduced muskrats (Ondatra zibethicus), which weigh on average an estimated 1,000 g (2.2 lb) when caught, are also taken in Finnish studies. They have been known to prey upon the Japanese giant flying squirrel (Petaurista leucogenys), which weighs around a median of 1,150 g (2.54 lb). One large mammalian prey widely associated with Ural owls are hares, though they seldom occur in substantial numbers in the diet, they appear to be opportunistically taken in most parts of the range. As much as nearly 25% of their biomass may be hares and hares are the largest known prey to be taken by Ural owls. While hunting hares, Ural owls usually focus their hunts on relatively young specimens. In Europe, both European hares (Lepus europaeus) and, especially, mountain hares (L. timidus) may be hunted. The mean size of mountain hares taken in Finland have variously been estimated at 173 to 2,000 g (0.381 to 4.409 lb), with a common median being about 500 g (1.1 lb). Exceptionally, Ural owls may take even adult mountain hares, which average about 2,900 g (6.4 lb), but this may be unconfirmed. Japanese hares (L. brachyurus) may also be taken in Japan as well.

=== Other prey ===
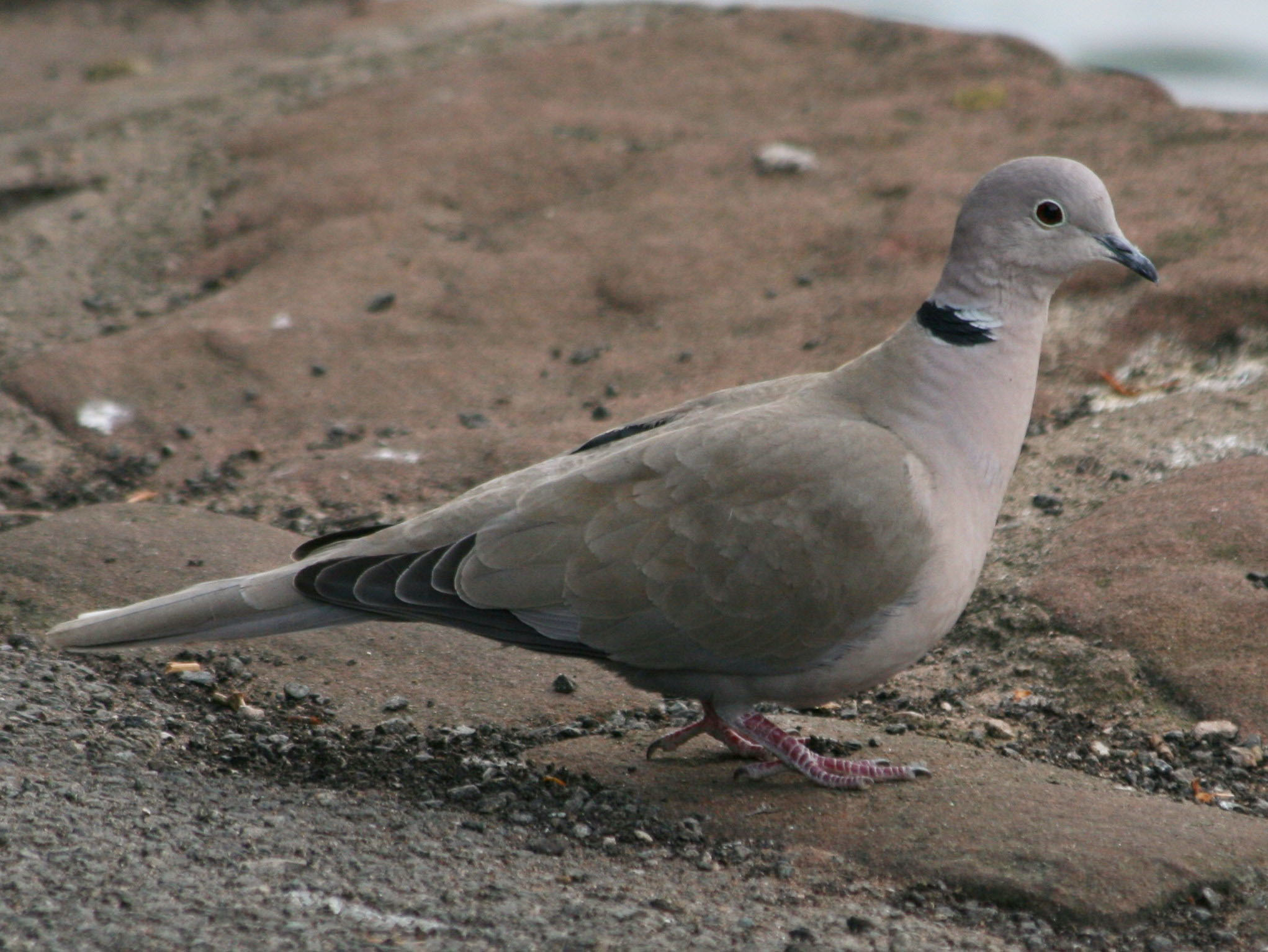
In some parts of Slovakia, Ural owls have come to specialize at preying on Eurasian collared doves

The second most important prey group behind mammals (albeit considerably behind) is birds. Birds are also the most diverse prey group in the Ural owl's diet, with well over 100 avian prey species recorded. Birds usually comprise less than 10% of the dietary intake by number in studies from Europe. Exceptionally high numbers, relatively speaking, were reported in Fennoscandia, especially when vole numbers go down. In bad vole years in Finland, of 860 prey items, 32.2% by number and 40.25% by biomass were birds. In particular, thrushes of the Turdus genus were the most reported prey genera in these years, averaging 19.4% by number and 23.6% of the biomass. In Värmland County, Sweden, birds amounted to 25.6% of the prey by number and 32.67% of the biomass. A wide diversity of birds were reported, thrushes being again the most often identified. For central and southern Europe, the reintroduced population of the Bavarian Forest of Germany may show the highest results for birds at merely 11.1%. However, in the diet study in the city of Košice, Slovakia, urban-adapted Ural owls were found to be relying almost solely on pigeons and doves for foods, namely the Eurasian collared dove (Streptopelia decaocto) and the rock pigeon (Columba livia) which constituted 76.7% and 13.4% of the contents of 16 pellets, respectively. In Russia, birds were far more significant overall in the Urals over other known studies, amounting to 17.01% of the 870 total prey items across different years and 47.6% among 146 prey items more locally near towns and villages in Perm Krai. In Japan, birds are somewhat more prominent in the diet of Ural owls compared to European data, usually compromising over 10% of the foods. The most birds reported in the diet of Japanese Ural owls were from 36 pellets found in Sakaide, Kagawa, which mainly comprised small birds, in particular the Eurasian tree sparrow (Passer montanus) (at 78.6% by number) and the white-cheeked starling (Spodiopsar cineraceus) (3.6%).

The hunting of birds by the Ural owl seems almost entirely based on opportunity as there is little evidence that they track down birds of any particular type, just merely upon the chance of encounter or detection. Thrushes are probably taken in many parts of the range due to their relative commonality in the habitat types used by Ural owls while other passerines that are widely taken also often have similar habitat preferences such as Old World flycatchers, finches and tits. Most passerines, and indeed most identified birds overall, are in between the size of a chaffinch (Fringilla coelebs), at a mean weight of 23.9 g (0.84 oz) and a Eurasian jay (Garrulus glandarius), at a mean weight of 160 g (5.6 oz). Bird prey may occasionally range down to the size of the 5.2 g (0.18 oz) goldcrest (Regulus regulus), which is Europe's smallest bird species. The mean estimated weight of birds taken in Finland was estimated at 83.4 g (2.94 oz), being slightly higher than the weight estimated of mammals taken there. A diversity of corvids may be taken, ranging in size from azure-winged magpies (Cyanopica cyanus), at 96 g (3.4 oz), to carrion crows (Corvus corone), at 570 g (1.26 lb), but usually turn up in low numbers in dietary studies and these owls are far less prolific corvid hunters than some diurnal predators such as Accipiters. Other than pigeons and doves, non-passerine bird prey are usually taken relatively infrequently, although some prey families such as gamebirds and woodpeckers are also quite widely taken. An unusual preference for relatively large bird prey was reported in study from the Urals where the most frequently identified avian prey species were the 429 g (15.1 oz) hazel grouse (Bonasa bonasia) and the 490 g (1.08 lb) hooded crow (Corvus cornix). On infrequent occasions, Ural owls may be able to overtake bird prey of up to approximately their own size or somewhat larger, i.e. up to or slightly over 1,000 g (2.2 lb) in average body mass, such as adult mallard (Anas platyrhynchos), common goldeneye (Bucephala clangula), black grouse (Tetrao tetrix), common pheasant (Phasianus colchicus), chicken (Gallus gallus domesticus), black-crowned night-heron (Nycticorax nycticorax) and some accipitrids as well as, so far as is known, only young specimens of the larger still western capercaillie (Tetrao urogallus). Outside of aforementioned families other infrequently taken bird prey has included cuckoos, nightjars, sandpipers, terns, rollers and hoopoes.

Due likely in no small part to the scarcity of herpetological prey diversity in the temperate and often frigid haunts of Ural owls, reptiles are very infrequent prey for this species. However, sometimes frogs may be taken when a Ural owl opportunes upon one in the warmer months of the year. Usually, in nearly any part of the range, frogs and other amphibians constitute less than 6% of the regional diets for the species. In the small Swedish study from Värmland County, an exceptional 12.2% of delivered prey was common frogs (Rana temporaria). In spite of historic records of fish scales being found seldom in some pellets, there is no known reportage of confirmed predation on fish by Ural owls in dietary studies. There is little evidence that in most of the range that Ural owls invest much time into pursuing or feeding on insects and other invertebrates, since the food reward is low for a fairly large owl to habitually hunt such prey, which may weigh only about 0.2 g (0.0071 oz). However, occasionally, concentrations of insects such as woodboring beetles may attract an owl. In the Bavarian Forest, more than 6% of the diet consisted of insects, mostly unidentified beetles. Despite most studies from Japan showing up to about 95% of the foods being mammals and secondarily birds, sometimes more extensive association with insect prey is reported. In the Kagawa Prefecture, an exceptional 24% of the diet consisted of insects and furthermore in Kyoto, Ural owls were observed to be routinely pursuing and eating Japanese rhinoceros beetles (Allomyrina dichotoma). In Primorsky Krai, Ural owls were further recorded as preying upon Daurian crayfish (Cambaroides dauricus).

=== Interspecific predatory relationships ===
Ural owls regularly live concurrently in different parts of their range with other owl species. Most sympatric species also share a preference for small mammals, largely voles, especially when they occur in relatively northerly temperate places such as the haunts of the Ural owls. Thus, the Ural owl is frequently considered to be a competitor with sympatric owl species. Most especially, the Ural owl has often being compared and studied in areas of sympatry with its close cousin, the tawny owl. The tawny owl may co-exist with Ural owls today in many parts of the latter's European distribution, including southern Fennoscandia, eastern and central Europe and European Russia. The dietary habits of the two species are largely concurrent, as in Uppland, Sweden, where prey species and groups were almost identical in rank of importance to their diets (i.e. field vole, water vole, Apodemus species, birds and frogs). On Mount Krim in Slovenia, both tawny and Ural owls took the same primary prey species but the tawny owl was shown to be adaptable to alternate prey during the low part of the vole population cycle while the Ural was less adaptive to alternate prey. The diets were largely similar between tawny and Ural owls as well in the Bavarian Forest of Germany but the tawny species took proportionately fewer field voles and more insects, and was estimated to take prey weighing on average 43% less than that taken by Ural owls. In Finland, food niche breadth for Ural owls overlapped about 73% with the tawny owl but the mean prey size was more than twice as much for the Ural owl, 38.4 g (1.35 oz) for tawny vs 78.1 g (2.75 oz) for Ural, and the tawny owl was recorded to take non-mammalian prey significantly more so than Ural owls. In Belarus, tawny owl prey sizes were between 31 and 49% smaller on average (utilizing two different calculation methods) than those of Ural owl but the smaller species had a considerably greater food niche breadth, which averaged 12.96 for tawnys and 5.48 for Urals. Compared to the tawny owl, the Ural owl is considerably larger in size and talon size (which is about 30% greater in the Ural), with the talon shape further indicating their different ecological roles, being proportionately shorter and more curved in tawny owls in accordance with its more varied diet and heavier and straighter in the Ural owl for dispatching relatively larger mammals. It is known that when ranges overlap between tawny and Ural owls, the Ural owl tends to dominate and sometimes kill the tawny owl. In Slovenia, Ural owls actually responded more consistently to recorded calls of tawny owls (40% of call exposures causing a vocal or physical response) than to recordings of calls of their own species (34% of call exposures eliciting a response). However, cases of interspecific killing between the species are fairly infrequent, and recent study indicates that the tawny owl's relatively checkered distribution in northerly areas such as Fennoscandia is not likely due to this competition but rather due to the regional habitat type favoring the Ural owl. The tawny owl is not as well suited to taiga habitats as is the Ural species and locally are less suited to alternate nest sites (i.e. nesting in areas lacking tree cavities or nest boxes, whereas the Ural can locally also use old bird nests and tree stumps). Warming average temperatures in Fennoscandia have appeared to effect many owl species negatively due to the limiting nature on vole cycles, but the tawny owl, being confined to the south, has had the most decreased effect locally due to the lowering vole numbers (and despite their general ability to adapt to different prey) while the Ural owl, in central Finland at least, is not yet showing as drastic a negative effect due to this. Similarly, the tawny owl and Ural owl are largely segregated by altitudinal range and habitat in eastern Europe (i.e. the Carpathian Mountains) and Poland, with little evidence that this is due to interspecific competition or predation but rather the suitably of the montane habitats. Here the tawny owl tends to occur at lower elevations while the Ural owl occupies the foothill forests at higher elevations. Generally, despite higher densities of the Ural in some mountainous parts of central and eastern Europe, the tawny owl is far more numerous in all countries of that region than the Ural owl. In Slovakia, 13.3% of Ural owl territories overlapped with those of tawny owls, a relatively low overlap given the overall environment. Despite the Ural owl's presumed dominance, in Slovenia, a tawny owl was observed to fiercely attack a Ural owl until it left the vicinity, though it is not clear whether this was a territorial encounter or antipredator mobbing. In Poland, during post-dispersal in winter tawny owls were able to temporarily utilize parts of Ural owl territories, taking advantage of the Ural owls less aggressive behaviour outside of the breeding season.

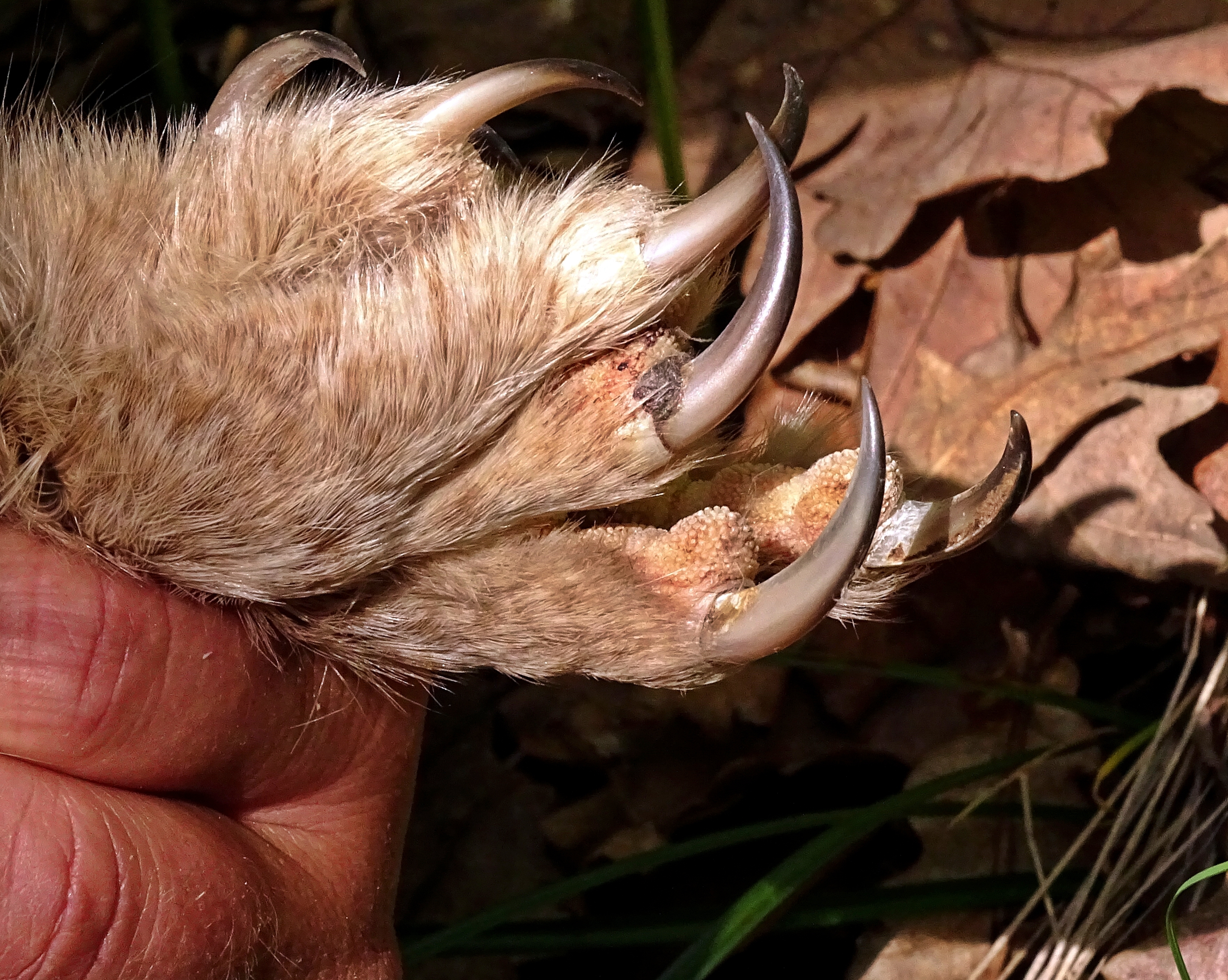
A Ural owl being ringed. For a Strix owl, it has quite formidable talons which aid it in food capture and interspecies conflicts.

Ural owls do not generally occur with other Strix owls excepting the tawny owl but overlap in much of their range also with the great grey owl, which furthermore ranges farther north and into the Americas as well. Despite its large size, the great grey owl is a dietary specialist on voles, relying almost exclusively on them. Its dietary restrictions are indicated by its foot morphology, with the great grey owl possessing talons that are conspicuously finer, smaller and less powerful looking than those of the Ural owl despite the slightly larger overall foot size (in correspondence with its body mass) of the great grey. Within the taiga that both the great grey and Ural owls prefer, great grey owls have been shown to nest in a wide diversity of locations, with more nest types overall than the Ural, but it does not normally use tree cavities as do the other two European Strix owls and seldom occurs in areas where conifers are not dominant anywhere in its range, such as riparian zones where forest can diversify to become mixed with deciduous trees. The difference in nest site usage and narrower dietary habits of the great grey are thought to mitigate most serious competition between the great grey and Ural owls. A larger owl than either species, however, is the Eurasian eagle-owl. The Ural owl is considerably smaller-bodied (around three times lighter), with a wingspan around 35% smaller and smaller talons and feet, so a competitive advantage is apparent even between the species' morphology. The eagle-owl also takes a large number of small prey such as voles but is conspicuously more variable in alternate foods. Across a similar but generally much broader distribution (both in latitude and longitude), eagle-owls take about three times as many prey species as do Ural owls, including much more species from all prey taxon, and also occur in a broader range of habitat types. Being much larger and (based on morphology) presumably much more powerful, the eagle-owl is able to take much larger prey than the Ural owl. More locally, in Finland, the Ural owl took proportionately more European water voles, overall birds and amphibians than did the eagle-owls but took far fewer gamebirds. The eagle-owls are likely avoided when possible by the Ural. Upon evidence, Ural owls are fairly regular in occurrence in North Ostrobothnia, where eagle-owls are rare to absent, but in South Ostrobothnia the Urals are scarce, possibly because the eagle-owls are relatively common. However, habitat differences may segregate the two species as well. In Finland, the eagle-owl appears to prefer pine-dominated forest while the Ural prefers spruce-dominated forests. Elsewhere, eagle-owls may frequent rocky areas where available (for nesting) and often hunt in more diverse and often more open areas, and in such areas Ural owls are rare to absent. Being smaller than the great grey owl and Eurasian eagle-owl, it is projected that the Ural owl can live off of less food overall than them. It is estimated that over a 6-month period, a Ural owl needs about 22.8 kg (50 lb) of food while a great grey owl needs about 27.4 kg (60 lb) and an eagle-owl needs about 54.8 kg (121 lb). The Ural owl has the potential to encounter other larger owls such as the snowy owl (Bubo scandiacus) in winter and the Blakiston's fish owl (Ketupa blakistoni) in the far east of the range, but are unlikely to interact extensively given the differences in habitat usage.

Apart from the aforementioned species, most other owl species that the Ural owl encounters in its range are significantly smaller. Furthermore, the Ural owl tends to dominate these species when encounters occur and so may be avoided. One species that often shares similar habitat and prey preferences with the Ural owl is the boreal owl. However, based on territory spacing, the boreal owls can appear to more strictly avoid the tawny owl, which is known to be highly aggressive in its territorial behaviour year-around while studies have indicated territorial exclusion by Ural owls is largely confined to the breeding season. It was hypothesized, however, in forested southern Poland that boreal owls selected nest sites not out of avoidance of tawny owls but based on the availability of suitable nesting sites. In the south Poland study, tawny owls usually occurred more so in fir-spruce woodland. In Slovenia, it was theorized that boreal owls incidentally benefited from the exclusion of tawny owls by dominant Ural owls when the three species occurred in adjacent habitats. However, evidence indicates that the boreal owls faces higher mortality when they nest too close to Ural owls, i.e. within about 2 km (1.2 mi). A similar relationship has been detected between the Ural owl and the Eurasian pygmy owl (Glaucidium passerinum), a species less than half the size of a boreal owl. However, the pygmy owl usually selected different forest types than Ural owls in areas of sympatry, in particular fir woodland, wherein the Ural tends to be rare or absent. However, ecological interactions were detected in Slovenia, as the pygmy owl was observed to display antipredator behaviour against Ural owls. Despite the different preferred forest habitat, 46.3% of ranges of Ural and Eurasian pygmy owls overlapped in Slovakia. Quite little is known about the ecological interactions between the Ural owl and the northern hawk owl (Surnia ulula), another boreal owl, despite a shared propensity for utilizing snags as nest sites. Hawk owls are also routine vole predators but share more ecological characteristics with the great grey owl than the Ural owls, in particular their nomadic behaviours and irruptive movements. Furthermore, hawk-owl's stronger tendency for diurnality may further provide a degree of partitioning.

The best known aspect of interspecific interactions with other owls and assorted other predators is interspecific predations. The Ural owl is at times vulnerable to predation by larger predators when encounters occur. Undoubtedly, the most dangerous predator is likely the Eurasian eagle-owl. Other predators known to prey upon Ural owls have included golden eagles (Aquila chrysaetos), eastern imperial eagle (Aquila heliaca), mountain hawk-eagle (Nisaetus nipalensis) and Eurasian lynx (Lynx lynx) as well as diurnal raptors that are only slightly larger, including the northern goshawk and lesser spotted eagle (Clanga pomarina). In most cases mentioned above, the age of the Ural owl taken by the predators are not usually specified (although any of the first three large eagles are certainly capable of striking down Ural owls potentially of any age). In some cases, goshawks have been known to kill parent Ural owls apparently entirely out of competition (despite different main food sources) and lay their eggs on a nest still containing the owls' eggs. Predators specifically noted to have taken young Ural owls, usually of around fledgling age or shortly post-dispersal (especially those used in reintroductions) have additionally included red foxes (Vulpes vulpes), European pine martens (Martes martes) and great grey owls. In Primorsky Krai, Asian badgers (Meles leucurus) and raccoon dogs (Nyctereutes procyonoides) are mentioned as potential or likely predators of Ural owls nests as well. In one recorded instance, a Ural owl that was observed seemingly trying to prey upon a non-native American mink (Neogale vison) was seen to lose the confrontation when the mink turned the tables, having apparently overpowered, killed and ate the owl. Although predation events upon Ural owls are widely reported, the relative number of incidents of such are very low and singular. South of the Arctic, it can be considered to rival the great grey owl as the owl species that is second least vulnerable to predation, behind the apex predator eagle-owls. The Ural owl is itself a fairly formidable predator of smaller owl species, although not as prolific a killer as are eagle-owls and northern goshawks. Among the owls Ural owls have been known to have preyed upon are Indian scops owl (Otus bakkamoena), collared scops owl (Otus bakkamoena), northern hawk-owls, tawny owls, Eurasian pygmy owls, boreal owls and long-eared owls. Diurnal raptors are also sometimes vulnerable to predation by Ural owls, including grey-faced buzzards (Butastur indicus), Eurasian sparrowhawk (Accipiter nisus), common kestrel (Falco tinniculus) and even apparent adult northern goshawks. Thus the Ural owl, coupled with a very low known rate of natural predations, appears to occupy a similar position in the intraguild predatory hierarchy as the goshawk. In Finland, both smaller owls and diurnal raptors such as sparrowhawks and even buzzards appear to avoid nesting near Ural owls. In addition, Ural owls are known to have successfully have chased off actively nesting goshawks as well as European honey buzzards (Pernis apivorus), common buzzards (Buteo buteo) and black kites (Milvus migrans) in order to claim the nests for themselves. Despite their potential predation on smaller mesopredators, when nest boxes for European pied flycatchers (Ficedula hypoleuca) were experimentally placed in the area of Ural owl nests, productivity lowered, and it is possibly because mesopredators were often attracted to the corresponding food base of the owls. On the contrary, experimental ground nests put out by researchers with random poultry eggs in central Finland were shown to be incidentally protected by the fierce presence of Ural Owls. In the Finnish ground placed almost directly under the Ural nest none at all were preyed upon, while in those placed 100 m (330 ft) away, 8.3% were predated, and those within 200–400 m (660–1,310 ft) experienced an average predation rate of 58.3%. At a great distance, at 500–900 m (1,600–3,000 ft) all ground nests were predated.

== Breeding ==
=== Pair occupancy ===
The Ural owl generally pairs for life and maintains a territory for several years. Mate retention in Fennoscandia was found to have averaged 98–100% in males and 90-95% in females, making it amongst the most monogamous birds of prey of any order (or at least well-studied bird of prey species). Territories of Ural owls are on average about 3 times larger than those of tawny owls. In Sweden, about 3000 pairs of Urals are found in an 150,000 km^{2} (58,000 sq mi) area. In Finland, nests are usually somewhere between 2 and 4 km (1.2 and 2.5 mi) apart in wildland areas. Per Finnish data, the Ural owl had the second most nest found for an owl species from 1985 to 1989, with 901 nests second to the boreal owl with 2265 nests. In Croatia, different areas had anywhere from 1.1 to 5.4 pairs on average per 10 km^{2} (3.9 sq mi) with an estimated 700-1000 breeding pairs left in the estimated 37% of Croatia that is still forested. The peak Croatian population was recorded in Plitvice Lakes National Park, predominately in mixed fir-beech montane forest, which held about 38 breeding pairs. Breeding in Slovenia is at a mean elevation of 850 m (2,790 ft), with altitude less important than habitat. Many forest types were used in Slovenia but fir-beech mixed forest were seen to be most often utilized. The highest Slovenian densities were around 2-3 pairs per 10 km^{2} (3.9 sq mi) for Mount Krim and around 4-5 pairs per 10 km^{2} (3.9 sq mi) for Snežnik. In 2016, it was estimated that Slovenia holds 400-700 pairs. Survey of the species in Silesian Beskids was done, where the population may represent a recent population expansion. With as many as three breeding attempts, Density was estimated at 0.6-0.9 pairs per 10 km^{2} (3.9 sq mi), 3-10 times lower than other nearby ranges in eastern Europe like the Low Beskids and Bieszczady Mountains. A low density population was found for Pieniny National Park, Poland with 0.9-1.3 per 10 km^{2} (3.9 sq mi). The average density in the Polish Kraków-Częstochowa Upland was 1 pair per 10 km^{2} (3.9 sq mi). In the northern part of Moravia, Czech Republic, 3-5 pairs were recorded around the turn of the 21st century, an almost certain population increase. A population increase noted in the Roztocze area of Ukraine, despite the forest being mixed rather than the subspecies' preferred beech dominant, now up to 1.7 pairs per 10 km^{2} (3.9 sq mi). Where nest boxes were put up for Ural owls in Samara Oblast showed the owls taking up residence in boxes at an average distance of 1.5 km (0.93 mi); against which the average distance of all installed boxes was 1.11 km (0.69 mi).

=== Nest characteristics ===
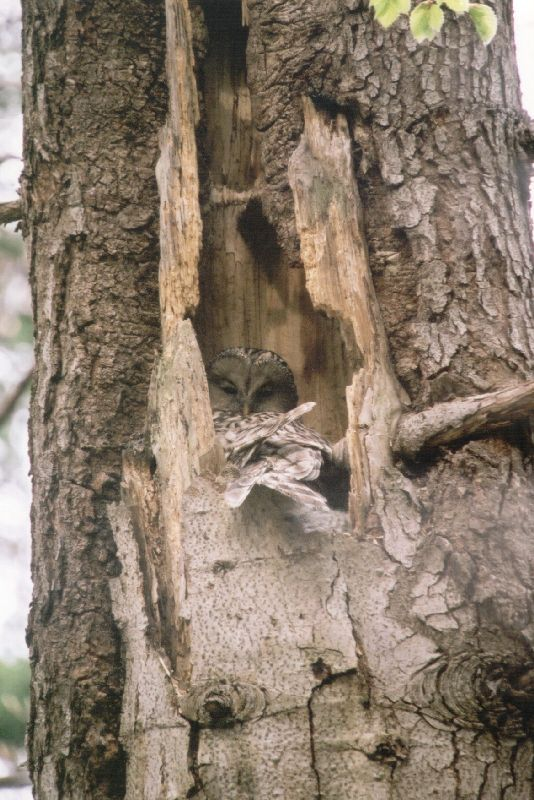
A Ural owl in Slovakia sitting on its nest, a natural tree cavity

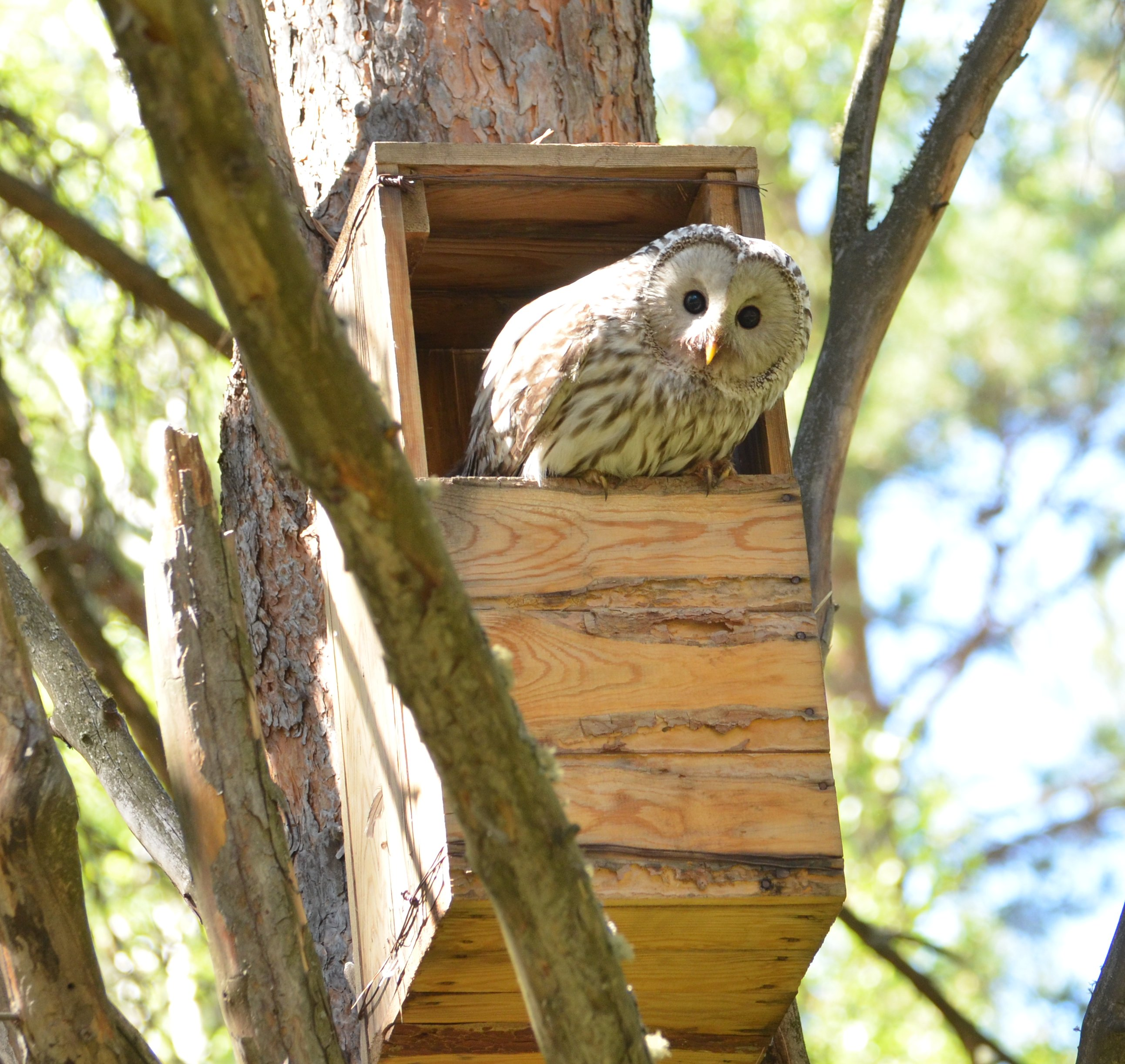
An adult Ural owl emerging from a nest box in Siberia, the use of which has bolstered the populations of the species

Potential nesting sites include large natural holes in trees, cavities left by large branch that have broken off, hollow trunks where canopies have been broken off (or "chimney stacks"), fissures or holes in cliffs or between rocks and holes in buildings. Tree crags and stumps used preferentially in central and eastern Europe are quite often common birch (Fagus sylvatica) or occasionally common oak (Quercus robur). Also Ural owls may regularly use stick nests of larger birds such as various accipitrids, in particular those built by goshawks and buzzards, as well as black stork (Ciconia nigra) nests, common raven (Corvus corax) nests and squirrel dreys, though dreys and nests of smaller birds such as sparrowhawks and crows may present risk of regularly collapsing as they may be overly small and perhaps flimsily built. A highly unusual nest site in terms of regional habitat was recorded in Slovakia, in the Východoslovenská Plains, a lowland floodplain, within an old buzzard nest. Nest can be in the vicinity of small towns, as was recorded in southern Sakhalin, so long as appropriate habitat and prey access is available in the region. In one case in Norway, a Ural owl utilized a hole in a common aspen (Populus tremula) in the same tree where common mergansers (Mergus merganser) were using a different hole. In several parts of their range they may make use of nest boxes, with the trend of nest box placement beginning and being perhaps most persistently used in Fennoscandia. Large nest boxes with an opening of about 16 cm (6.3 in) in diameter are preferred by the species. Elsewhere, about 29% of nest boxes set out in Slovenia are known to have been used. In Russia's Altai Krai, Biya River area between 2010 and 2012, 15.2-48.9% of nest boxes that were erected were used with annual variation explainable by cycles of primary food sources. In Samara Oblast of 74 nest boxes set in 4 study plots by 2009, 41.9% were used by Ural owls (with about 14.9% used by various other animals). In Samara, about 20.6% of Ural owls pairs in the study block still used natural nest sites despite the availability of nest boxes. Nearby to the prior site, in the woodlands outside of Biysk of the Altai Krai, 8 territories were detected with all 6 nest found in nests built by accipitrids. Use of 15 total nest boxes in Akademgorodok, Russia over three study years varied wildly based presumably on prey population cycles with anywhere from 0% to 50% used annually. Incidental benefit has been shown for several beetle species and sometimes other insects that have come nest in the substrate of Ural owl nest boxes, even in areas where the invertebrates are rare or endangered.

Of 250 nests recorded over nearly a century in Finland, stumps accounted for most (34.3%), followed by bird nests (28.5%), nest boxes (23.1%), tree holes (11.35%) and lower numbers on ground or on rock face or building. 53% of Finnish stumps were in spruce and 38% in aspens, from 1.2 to 10 m (3.9 to 32.8 ft) high with an average of 4.5 m (15 ft). Stumps were preferred in the northern and central part of Finland. 67% of Finnish cavity nests were broken off branches of birches, though black woodpecker (Dryocopus martius) holes that had rotted and expanded were also sometimes used, with the cavity nests height from 1.5 to 12 m (4.9 to 39.4 ft). Cavities were preferred in the southern part of Finland. Nest boxes increased in importance after 1960 and, by 1969, 50% of recorded nest usage in all Finland was in nest boxes. In Slovenia, 56.2% of recorded nests were in tree holes, with about a further 20% on stumps, at 1 to 10 m (3.3 to 32.8 ft) over the ground (on an average 5.2 m (17 ft)). Less often Slovenian owls nests in old bird of prey nests (16-19%). In Slovakia, beech dominated forest were selected about 74% of the time. Among 27 Slovak nests, 59.3% were in common beeches, 14.8% in fir, 11.1% in spruce and 14.8% in other deciduous trees. Nests on stumps were recorded twice in Hokkaido but otherwise Japanese Ural owls appear to rarely use such nest sites, favoring variously tree cavities, birds' nests and nest boxes with little evidence of a strong preference of any one type of nest site. Even in peak vole years some parts may be unable to breed due to lack of acceptable nest sites. Besides the unquantifiable threat of global warming, loss of old forest with dead trees with ample cavities is the species' main threat. This is especially prevalent during forest management historically and the practices of forestry departments have often favored tawny owls and been detrimental to populations of Ural owls. However, in Hedmark, Norway, the placing of 80 nest boxes did not increase the country's Ural owl population, with only 4 of the boxes used. The lack of success for Norwegian populations is thus not seemingly due to a lack of nesting sites but is theorized to be more so correlated with a poor prey population for them. Prior studies, in central and eastern Norway, somewhat more westerly into Norway than previously thought but not an extensive range, with the clutch size being smaller, at a mean of 2.85, within Scandinavia compared to 2.93 in Sweden, 3 in southern Finland and 3.92 in northern Finland.

=== Eggs and young ===
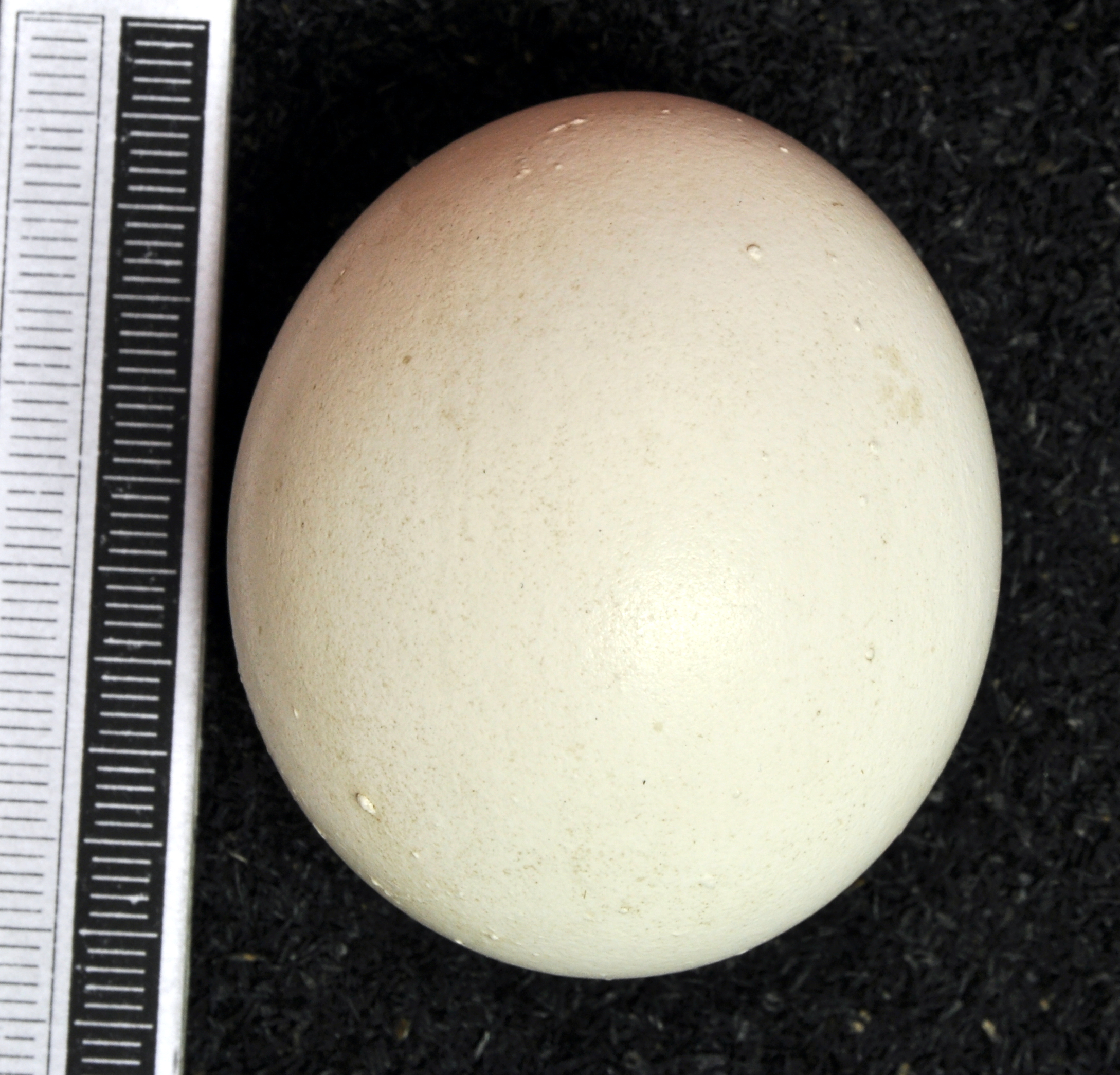
The quite rounded, white egg of a Ural owl

The clutch size is typically 3-4 (rarely from as few as 1 to as many as 6), with the eggs being pure white and quite rounded. The mean egg laying dates in Fennoscandia are between mid-March and late April. In montane Slovenia, somewhat surprisingly, it is slightly later at late March into early June. Mean clutch size was found to be 2.93 in Sweden. Mean clutch size in Finland was 2.24 but could range from 2.08 to 3.98 on average in poor and good years for vole prey. Mean clutch size in Slovenia is about 3.3. Another Slovenian study showed a fairly lower mean clutch size of 2.4 with evidence that clutch was reduced by low food access in the early part of the breeding season. Clutch size in a small sample from Nizhny Novgorod Russia was found to average 3.6. The clutch size average in nest boxes of Samara Oblast was 2.4. Egg sizes are usually between 46.5 and 52.3 mm (1.83 and 2.06 in) in height by 39 to 44 mm (1.5 to 1.7 in) in diameter, and the eggs weighing on average about 47 g (1.7 oz) when fresh. Based on studies in southern Finland, amongst 59 studied females, egg size varies by 22.4% through the cycle years and the largest eggs are roughly twice the mass of the smallest, a very considerable variation. The eggs are laid directly to bottom of nesting surface in roughly 2 day intervals. Females alone incubate usually beginning with the first egg, and is fed by her mate throughout. In 108 female Ural owls from Finland the start of incubation varied individually, with synchronous hatching shown to be disadvantageous to overall productivity. Evidence was found that females repeated their incubation start time annually was moderately strong (26% repeatability) so it may be an evolved trait. Incubation lasts for 28 to 35 days and averages about 6 days longer than the incubation period of the tawny owl. The hatchlings break at concurrent time lapses as the eggs are laid (about 2 days), the females staying by until fledging. The downy chick is white; at the stage when they typically leave the nest (or mesoptile stage) the downy is pale dirty whitish and barred with greyish-brown on head, nape, mantle and underparts. Nestlings leave the nest at about 35 days old and can fly at 45 days. They are fed and cared for over an additional 2 months or so after leaving the nests.

=== Parental behaviours and characteristics ===
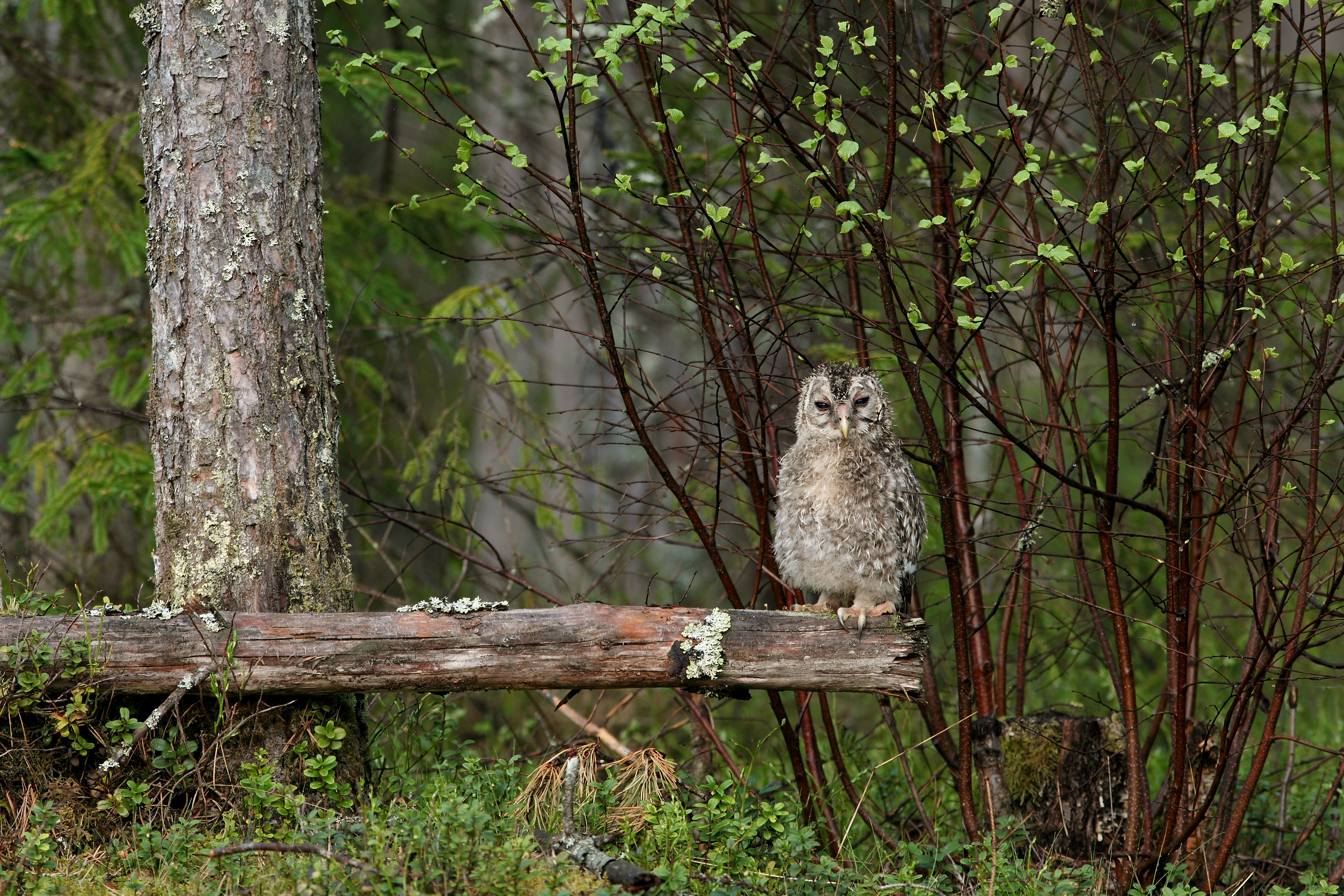
A young mesoptile Ural owl shortly after it has left the nest in Albu Parish, Estonia.

The young Ural owls officially reach sexual maturity in the year after independence. However, in southern Finland, it was found that first time nesting females generally would not attempt to nest if it was a poor vole year and the largest percentage (about 40%) first started breeding attempts in intermediate years (between poor and good vole years), which often did not occur until they were 3 to 4 years old. The same typical age (3–4 years) was detected in central Sweden, despite the females often being on territory within their first year. Upon study of feather molt and wear, it was supported that some female Ural owls breed in their 2nd or 3rd year, but most do not breed until their 4th or 5th year. On the contrary, a Finnish study found that for Ural owls of both sexes, it was estimated that the mean starting age for breeding is 2.9 years, with an average breeding life expectancy of 3.3 years. Furthermore, females that started breeding at 2 or 3 were shown in Finland to have higher reproductive "fitness" than females who started breeding at 4 or older. Females laid eggs in Finland an average of 2.7 times in their life and produced an average of 6.7 fledglings over their reproductive lifetime (with the most productive females producing up to 33 fledglings). Brooding activity peaks, with typically 9-14 daily visits, in Finnish studies in the late evening during spring and summer while tending to young, with a weaker peak activity time in the early morning, both timed to peak prey activity times. It is well known that mother Ural owls defends her brood in a fearsome display. In Finland, the repeatability of the nesting defense behaviour by females was ranked as 52.4%, starting with a bark and taking flight, then fly-bys towards the perceived threat and culminating in attacks and powerful strikes. Per this study, those females that laid their eggs earlier on average defended their nest more vigorously than those who laid their clutches later. The force and ferocity of the attack led to its common name in Swedish (Slaguggla or "attacking owl"), and their attacks can potentially cause grievous physical harm even to an animal as large as a human. In at least some cases, humans experience the loss of one eye or have been blinded, with broken eye sockets or eyeballs extracted by Ural owl attacks. Due to her attacks, the predation rate on Ural owl is often exceptionally low. Partial feather molting by females was thought to not have great bearing on her brooding abilities, since it was largely timed to periods where the female (and her brood of offspring) are being almost entirely fed by the male of the pair.

=== Breeding success ===
Broods with more than three chicks sometimes experience siblicide per study in southern Finland, but instances of siblicide are rare otherwise. Larger clutches seem to be an insurance behaviour since authors showed that broods of 4 or so were more likely to have younger sibling die sooner or later before independence. Productivity is largely associated with prey access, with the effect most studied in Fennoscandia because of the dramatic 3 year fluctuation of vole prey appears to cause great variations in productivity. Natality rates could vary from zero to 2.9 across the years based on prey numbers in Sweden, with the average being 1.03-1.12 fledglings per pair and 2.68 fledglings per successful pair. However, it was estimated in Sweden that on average 62% of owls do not survive their first year, in comparison to adult female annual mortality which was estimated at 10.5%. Similarly, in southern Finland, from 29 to 58 breeding pairs bred annually in the same study area and could produce anywhere from 1.17 to 3.21 fledglings depending on prey cycles (3.5 average fledglings per successful attempts in high vole years against 1.79 per successful nest in low vole year). Finnish study showed that 21.7% of all clutches failed to hatch and 4.3% died completely after hatching. Hatchability in south Finland averages 87% across all years. On a broader scale, from 422 to 1710 territories were recorded in Finland from 2009 to 2011 with the number of successful nests ranging annually from 168 to 1341. The population trends were more or less mirrored by those of the Finnish tawny owls but tawny brood size averages 0.68 larger than that of the Ural. Prospects for breeding are generally low during the low point of the three-year cycle of the vole prey of Urals in south Finland but paradoxically when a high vole year is followed by a low one, the number of attempted clutches is higher but the rate of nest failure is higher. For instance, within a Finnish study, 144 eggs were found in 63 nests during a low vole phase, in the increase phase 1212 from 338 nests and in peak phase 1259 eggs from 345 nests. However, this study showed low recruitment from clutches was detected in both increase and peak years, and the complications and individual variations of each pair may cause variations that the previous theories do not account for. Breeding success in southern Finland was also driven by the mother Ural owl's age, with 3-5-year-old females being less productive than those that were 6 to 9 years old, and that older females, of more than 10 years old, tended to lay larger and more rounded eggs. In Finland, supplemental fed pairs nest up to 1 week earlier and produce up to 0.6 more eggs than those that were not, therefore food limitation does appear to effect productivity of the species. Males were mildly more numerous in Finland among fledged young (56%) but survivorship of the two sexes were essentially equal and body mass in both sexes averaged about 6% more in good vole years. Studies of 274 Finnish adult females found that 18% of them produced about half of the fledglings. Breeding attempts in Nizhny Novgorod Russia produced an average number 3.1 young to leave the nest.

Despite being farther south than many aforementioned studies (i.e. from Fennoscandia), in Estonia a highly variable breeding success rate was observed to be concurrently happening during prey population cycles. In Slovenia, about 80% of breeding attempts manage to produce at least one fledgling. Another Slovenian study showed a nearly 5% higher breeding success overall due to late summer peaks of edible dormouse (July or later). 7 nests in Podkarpackie Voivodeship, Poland were shown to able to produce an average 2.8 fledglings in a good year but no nest could be found in a poor rodent year. Findings showed that parent Ural owls, particularly the adult female, are able to adjust their breeding cycle to maximize survivorship of their young well given the experience accrued during their relatively long lifespan, and are relatively successful at mitigating issues such as parasitism and infestations in nest boxes if they are being used. Post-dispersal young from Vienna Woods in Austria were radio-tracked and showed a mean dispersal distance of 8,778 m (28,799 ft) from release site and were shown to experience about a 23% mortality rate.

== Status ==
The Ural owl is not a densely populated bird but can be locally not uncommon. The IUCN estimates that there are between 350,000 and 1,200,000 individuals living in the wild globally. Most decreases in recent history have been reported from areas where hollow and broken trees were removed from forests. In Estonia, managed forest almost invariably have fewer Ural owls than undisturbed forest has because of reduction of snags and other natural cavities to use. However, the general trends are positive for most European Ural owl populations. The erection of nest boxes has caused population increases in several parts of the range, especially Finland. In eastern Europe, it is one of the more stable owl species, though it is far less numerous overall than some (i.e. tawny, long-eared, and little owls (Athene noctua)). Several population increase and expansions have been detected in central and eastern Europe for Ural owls in recent history, in sync with other owls considered boreal species (i.e. great grey, boreal, Eurasian pygmy). Previous records indicated staple populations in the 1980s for Ural owls in the western Carpathian Mountains (estimated at 1000 pairs) and northern Belarus (at 50-100 pairs). By the 1990s, the number had grown to 1000-1500 pairs in the western Carpathians and to 220-1350 pairs in northern Belarus. By 2005, the numbers were up to 3500 pairs in Carpathians and a drastic increase to 2700-4300 pairs in Belarus.

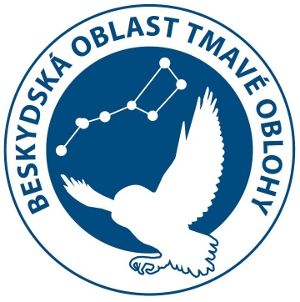
Ural owl in the logo of the Beskydy Dark-Sky Park, Czechia

In the Czech Republic, partially due to deliberate reintroductions, the numbers went from 1-5 pairs in 1985–89 to 25-40 pairs by 2001–2003. In selected plots of southeastern Poland, Belarus and Latvia, densities went from 1-2 pairs per 100 km^{2} (39 sq mi) to 10 pairs per 100 km^{2} (39 sq mi). In these three countries, northern population now much higher density than southern ones, i.e. 5–8.1 pairs per 100 km^{2} (39 sq mi) in north to 3.1-3.6 pairs per 100 km^{2} (39 sq mi) in the south. A range expansion of Ural owls was detected in western Ukraine (in the general region of Roztochya Biosphere Reserve and Yavorivskyi National Park). in 2005–07 up to 1.7-2 pair per 10 km^{2} (3.9 sq mi) whereas in the past (i.e. to the 1990s) the species was a rare vagrant to this area. This density of this Ukrainian population is higher than seemingly most in Scandinavia and Belarus but lower than in southwestern Poland and Slovenia; while whether this represents a population increase or merely a population shift is unknown nor its relation to forestry. In some parts of Slovakia, such as Slanské vrchy, Vihorlat and the Ondavská Highlands the density of pairs may be up to a pair per square kilometer, perhaps the highest known specieswide. 400-500 Slovenian pairs from 1973 to 1994 is as of 2006 is estimated at 1,400-2,500 pairs. In the Orava region of Slovakia, the population may have increased fivefold during the above stated years. While many owl species (eagle-owl, long-eared, boreal) have appeared to have generally declined in period of 1982–2007 in Finland, to the contrary Ural owls increased by about 1% (excluded from these estimates were too difficult to analyze northerly nomadic owl species). In every regard but number of nestlings that were ringed (in which it also trails the Eurasian pygmy), it has been observed the Ural is the 2nd commonest detected breeding owl after the boreal owl in Finland with 2545 territories found, 1786 nests observed and 4722 nestlings ringed. An increase of the population was found in the Moscow region where tall stands remained despite the rather developed environment nearby.

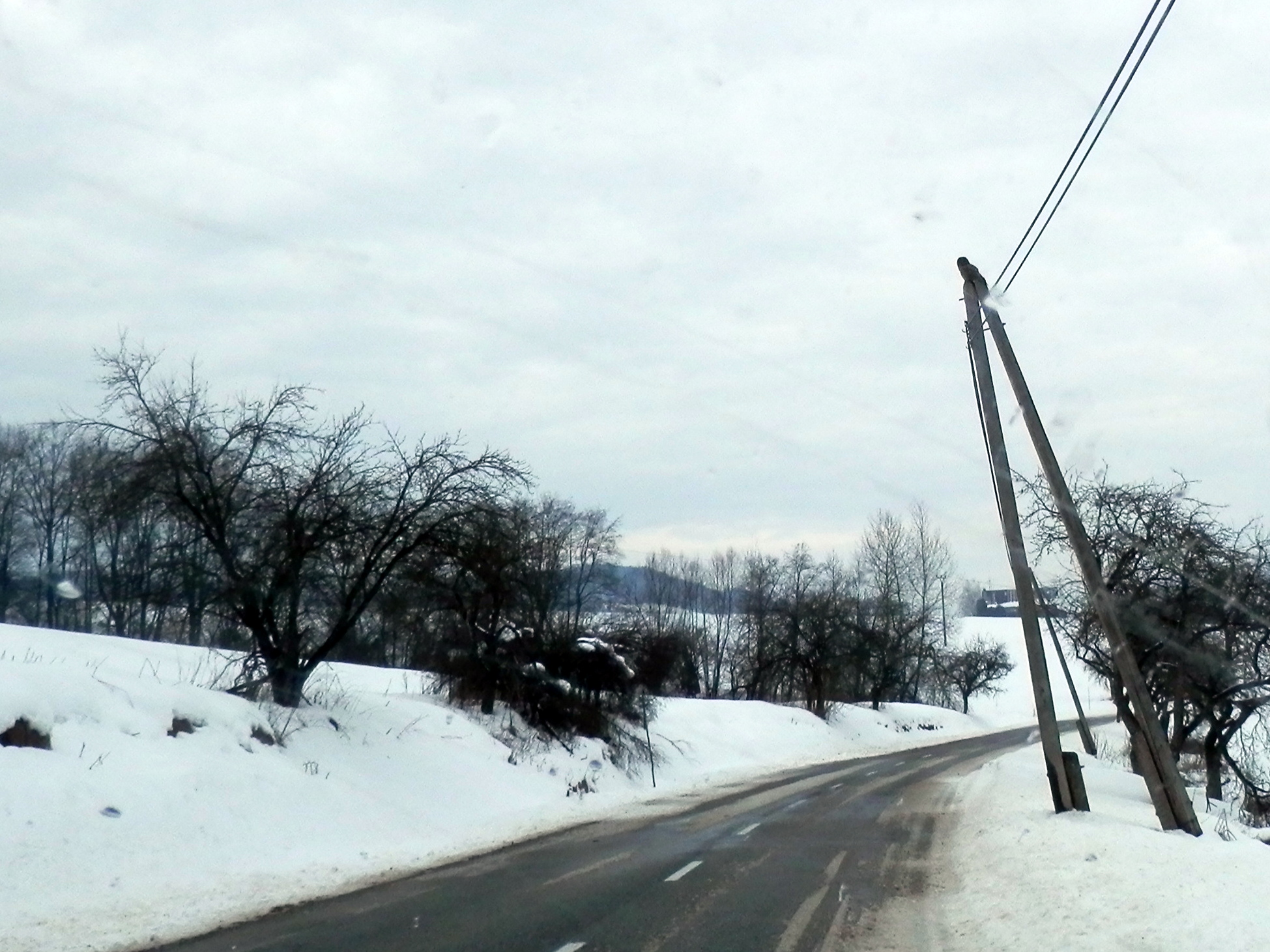
A Ural owl perches in the winter on a power pole in Slovakia. As its range expands, the Ural owl may be increasingly vulnerable to anthropogenic mortality causes.

Occasionally, Ural owls are vulnerable to flying into manmade objects. In most parts of the range, they are less vulnerable than many other large birds of prey (in part because of their preference for remote forests) but certainly a few are likely to be claimed as such. Many such mortalities are due to wire collisions and electrocutions, which are likely increase especially as populations expand and move into areas closer to human habitations. Other collision kills, such as with glass buildings and, widely, with various automobiles, may too potentially be on the increase. Though historically subject to some degree of persecution, Ural owls were spared from the worst of it perhaps by nesting in remote forests and possibly by being generally less predatory to small domestic fowl, game animals and the like than large raptorial birds like Eurasian eagle-owls, golden eagles and northern goshawks, all of which were badly persecuted and thusly reduced. Like other wild birds, Ural owls may be vulnerable to some degree of mortality due to diseases and infections but these are unlikely to compromise overall populations. A case of the bacterial infectious disease Tularemia was observed in a ural owl as was Usutu virus in a single bird. 71.4% of 14 wild Ural owls in Japan had blood parasites while a smaller but still present number of Acanthocephala and roundworms were detected in known European data. Many Japanese Ural owls were also found to be vulnerable to biting lice.

=== Reintroduction ===
Species reintroductions have been undertaken in some different parts of Europe. By far the best documented Ural owl reintroduction was in the Bohemian forest, which ranges between the countries and regions of Bavaria in Germany, the Czech Republic and upper Austria. Previously the species was extinct here by 1926 (by 1910 on the Austrian side). Established of captive breeding stock occurred between 1972 and 2005 (with origins from 7 different countries and a mixture of the two main European subspecies). For this breeding program, 212 young Ural owls were originally released. During the study, experimental introductions were made to tawny owl nests, although this potentially exposed them to risk of hybridization. Otherwise, parentage consisted of relatively newly established Ural owls. Both tawny and Ural owls were shown to be able to successfully raise the young Ural broods. Food was also offered to pairs at nearby release pens and 60 nest boxes erected to compensate for lack of nest sites, especially in areas of secondary forest. 33 Ural owls were recovered dead, while an additional 4 were weakened or injured to the state of being unable to continue to live in the wild. Most of the mortality was due to electrocution or were hit by cars but a few were illegally shot. The first wild breeding of a Ural pair in the Bohemian forest occurred in 1985 but the first successful breeding was not until 1989 (with the pair having producing 4 offspring). Between 1981 and 2005 a total of 49 broods were recorded, 31 of which were successful with 59 young produced (avg 1.3 per all attempts, 1.9 per successful pair). No fewer than 6 pairs (possibly 5-10 breeding pairs) were established by the end of study, with the carrying capacity within the forest estimated at 10 pairs. For a self-sustaining breeding population, it was felt that at least 30 pairs are necessary in the general area within connected corridors to the Bohemian forest. Therefore, 87 birds were introduced into nearby Sumava National Park between 1995 and 2006, an estimated 2-3 breeding pairs have established there now. A still uncertain pilot program in Mühlviertel, Austria may or may not have produced a pair as well. In 2001, among two reintroduction attempts in Austria, both failed. All told from the entire Bavarian reintroduction, it was said that the owls producing a total of 204 offspring between 1972 and 2014, although many of these may not have survived. More successful than the Austrian part of the Bavarian forest reintroductions was the reintroduction elsewhere in Austria, namely the Vienna Woods. In this project, 67 young owls were released between 2009 and 2013. A nesting box network of 127 boxes were set out to be utilized and one of Europe's largest stands of beech trees was present. In the Vienna Woods, the survival rate was high at about 70.5%. By 2011–2012, 10 pairs attempted to nest, establishing home ranges averaging about 300 ha (740 acres) and produced 3.1 fledglings per successful pair.
