= Ljubljana Basin =

Coordinates: 46°5′32.21″N 14°28′28.15″E

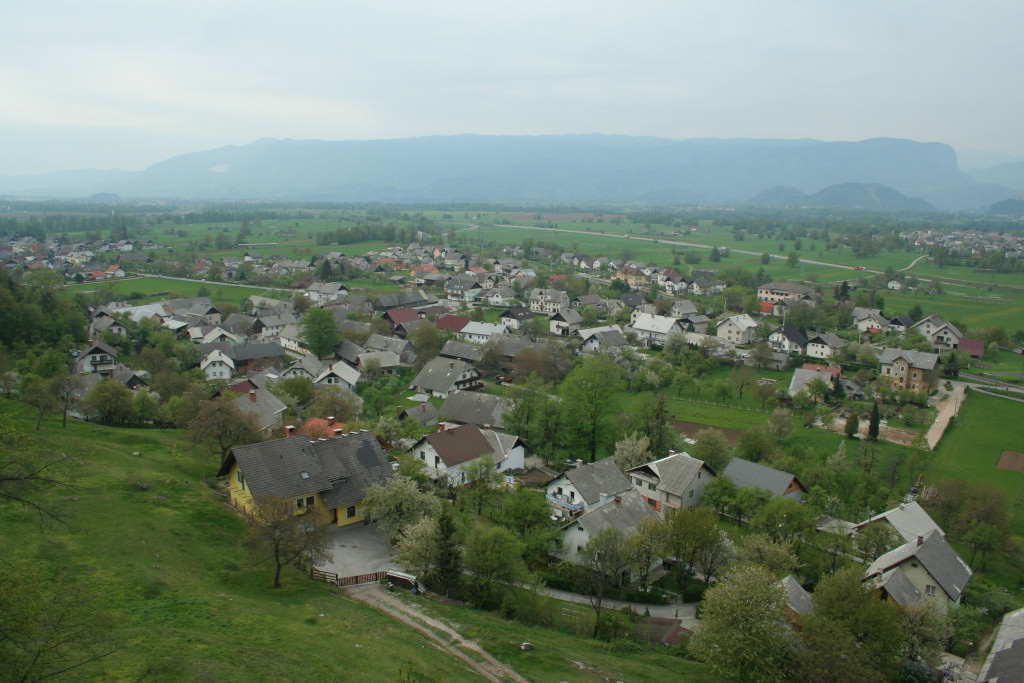
The northern part of the basin near the village of Žirovnica (in the background, Jelovica)

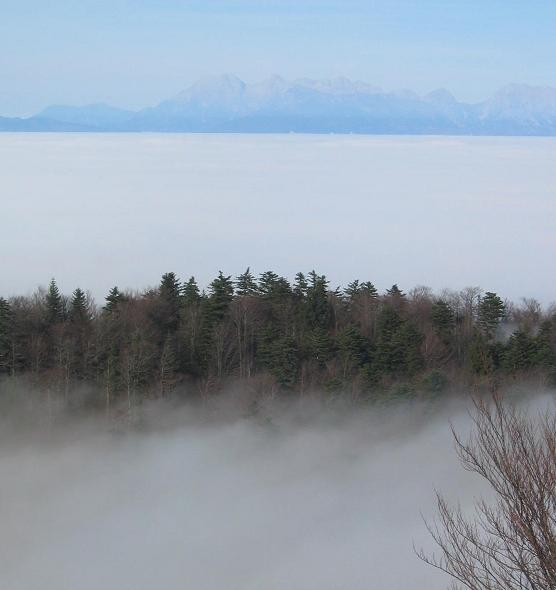
Ljubljana Basin in the mist (view from Krim in the south towards the north)

The Ljubljana Basin (Slovene: Ljubljanska kotlina) is a basin in the upper river basin of Sava. It is the most populated area in Slovenia and it is metropolitan area of Ljubljana. Its main rivers are the Sava, the Kamnik Bistrica and the Ljubljanica.

== Cities and towns ==
- Ljubljana
  - Brezovica
  - Škofljica
  - Ig
  - Vodice
  - Dobrova-Polhov Gradec
  - Medvode
- Kranj
  - Cerklje na Gorenjskem
  - Šenčur
  - Naklo
- Domžale
  - Trzin
  - Mengeš
  - Lukovica
  - Moravče
- Kamnik
  - Komenda
- Škofja Loka
  - Železniki
  - Žiri
- Vrhnika
- Grosuplje

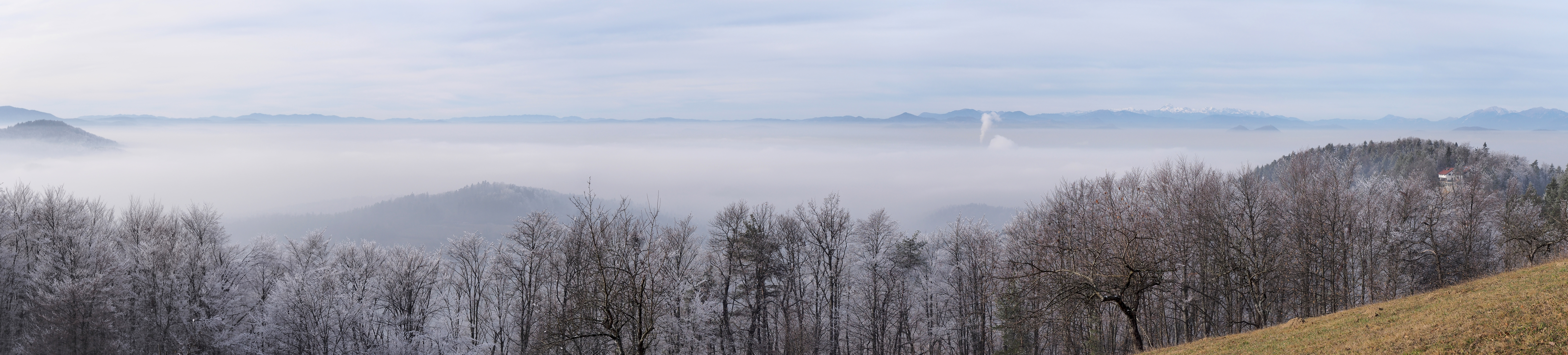
Ljubljana Basin in mist, view to east from Javor hill.
