= Mount Krim =

Mountain in the country of Slovenia

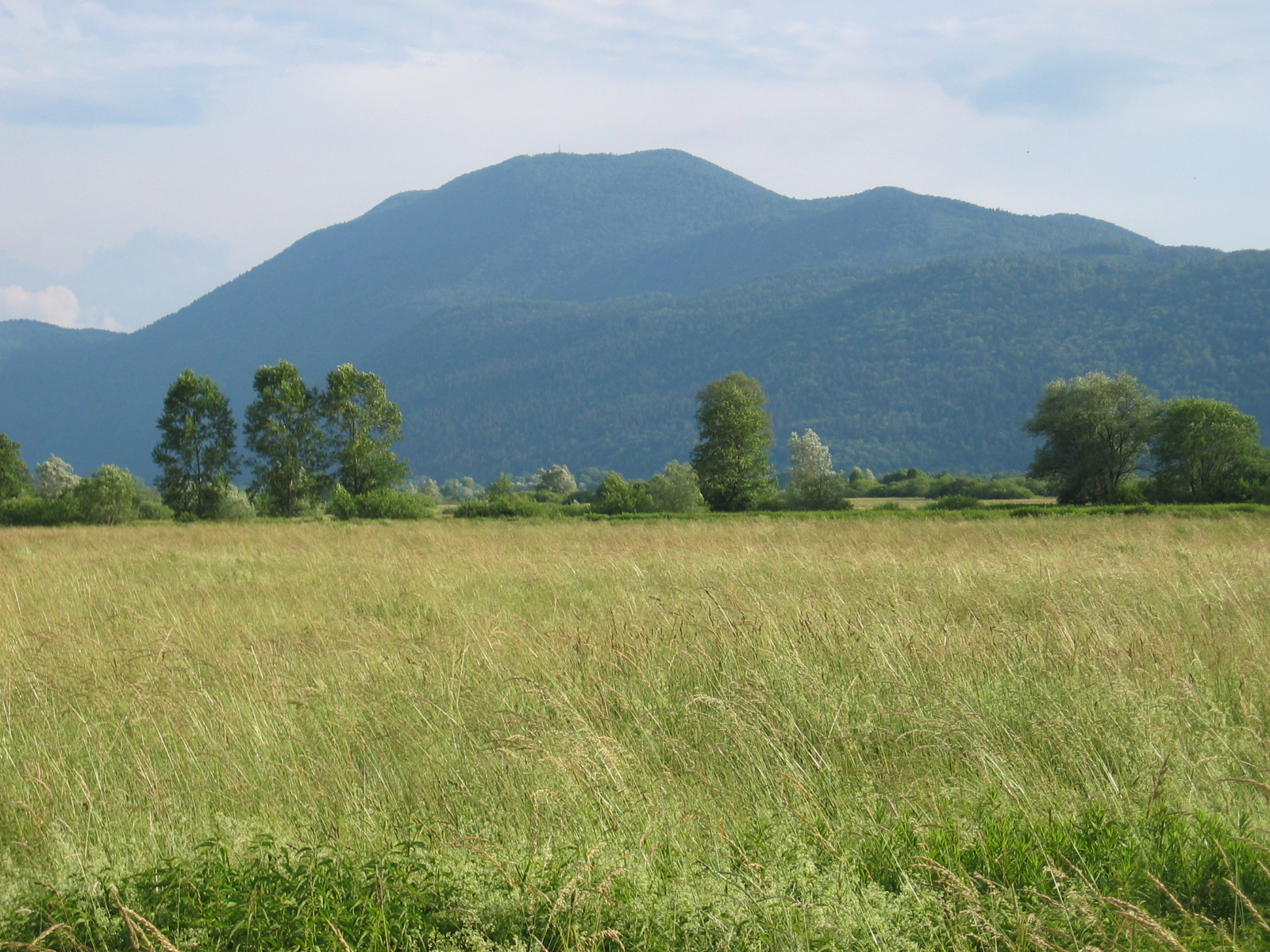
- View of Mount Krim from the Ljubljana Marsh

Highest point
- Elevation: 1,107 m (3,632 ft)
- Coordinates: 45°55′44.53″N 14°28′11.48″E

Geography
- Location within Slovenia
- Location: Slovenia

Mount Krim (pronounced [ˈkɾiːm]) is a 1,107-meter-high mountain on the southern edge of the Ljubljana Marsh in Slovenia. Due to its location and shape, it is one of the most recognizable features of the Ljubljana Basin and it is visited each year by thousands of hikers. In the 1970s, the Yugoslav People's Army closed the summit to the public and built a radio center there. Since 1991, the summit has been open again to visitors, and there is also a small mountain lodge.

== Name ==
Mount Krim was attested in written sources in 1689 as Khorim and Korin, and in 1726 as Kurin. The name is derived from the present passive participle *kurimъ 'smoking', referring to the clouds that often obscure the summit.

== History ==
Although Mount Krim is a prominent feature against the Ljubljana Marsh, it did not play a significant role in the past. In 1817, geodesists set up a first-class trigonometric point, numbered 172, on the mountain, which was used as a benchmark coordinate for cadastral measures for Carniola, the Littoral, and Istria. Measurements were taken from 1817 to 1828, and this is commemorated by a bronze memorial plaque on the wall of the mountain lodge. During the Second World War, Mount Krim and its surroundings served as a haven for Partisan units because of its challenging terrain and extensive forests. In 1942, Krvavice Partisan Hospital was established below Mount Krim, near the Iška Gorge.

The development of broadcasting technology made Mount Krim of increasing interest due to its dominant location. In 1971, the Slovenian broadcaster RTV started building a transmitter on the mountain in order to provide television coverage to an area that could not be reached by the transmitters at Mount Krvavec and Ljubljana Castle. The Yugoslav military also took an interest in the location and started building its own facilities at the same time as RTV. The summit of Mount Krim was then closed to hikers and other members of the public, who could go no higher than Mount Krimšček (941 m), also known as Little Mount Krim (Slovene: Mali Krim). While it was used by the military, the mountain was an important radio point for the army, serving as a radio and radio-relay point that covered most of Slovenia and also maintained contact with similar points throughout Slovenia and the rest of Yugoslavia. The exterior of the military structure indicates that it was similar to that found at Guslica on Mount Risnjak. In 1991, during Slovenia's Ten-Day War of independence, Slovenian Territorial Defense units sought to force the staff at the facility to surrender, but without success. The structure continued to be used by the Yugoslav military until October 1991, when the Yugoslav People's Army withdrew from Slovenia. After 1991 the summit was again accessible to the public and the military structure is more or less abandoned. Next to it there is a small mountain lodge, which is visited by thousands of hikers every year.

== Geography ==
In the winter, when the Ljubljana Basin contains much fog and low clouds, outings to Mount Krim are the nearest point offering sunshine. Mount Krim is also referred to as "Ljubljana's weatherman" (Slovene: ljubljanski vremenski prerok) because a cloud obscuring the top of the mountain is said to portend bad weather for the surrounding region. The summit offers a good view of the Ljubljana Marsh, the Karawanks, the Kamnik–Savinja Alps, and part of the Julian Alps.

== Access ==
There are several well-marked hiking paths on Mount Krim. Some of the most popular are:

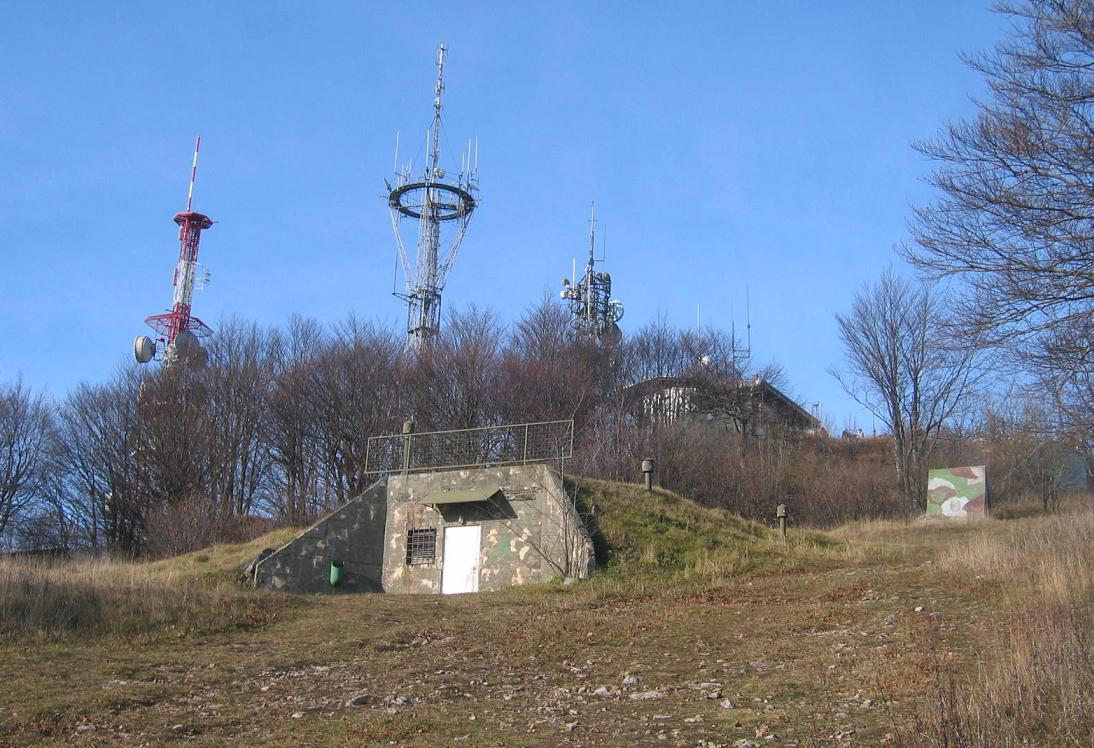
Transmitter, former military bunker, and lodge on Mount Krim

- Mesnice–Krim (by road, easy)
- Jezero–Krim (easy)
- Iška Gorge Lodge–Krim (steep)
- Rakitna–Krim (easy)
- Preserje–Krim (easy)
- Strahomer–Krim (easy)
- Jezero–Krim (easy)
- Iška–Krim (easy)
- Tomišelj–Krim (easy)
- Vrbljene–Krim (easy)
- Plahanov Laz Hunting Lodge–Krim (easy)
- Dolenja Brezovica–Krim (easy)

== Cultural significance ==
Mount Krim holds a distinctive place in Slovenian culture as both a natural landmark and a historical symbol. Often referred to as "Ljubljana's Weatherman" due to a local proverb linking cloud cover on its peak to incoming rain, the mountain is also a popular destination for hikers seeking panoramic views of the surrounding region.
