= Alenka Ermenc =

Slovenian military officer (born 1963)

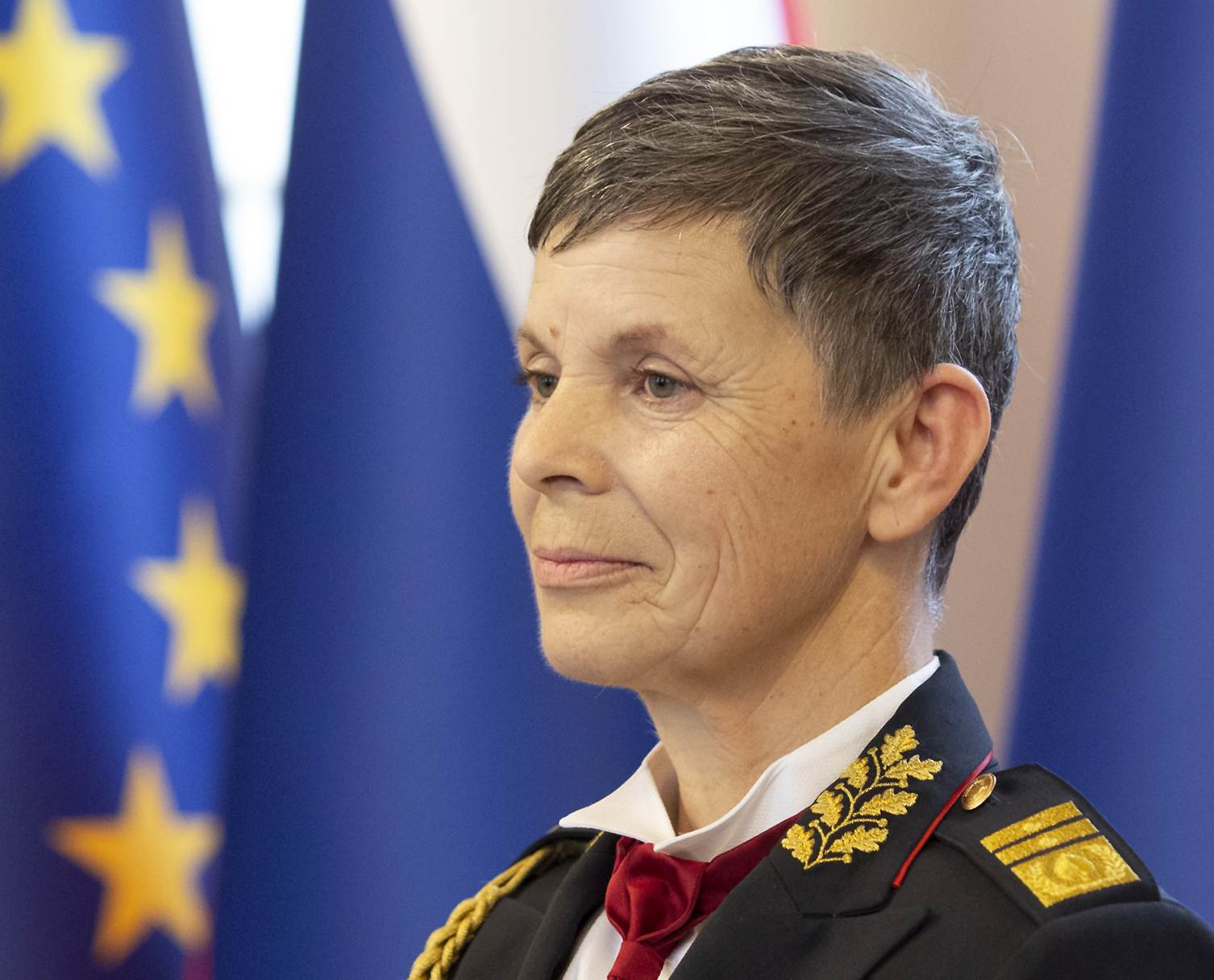
- Ermenc in 2018

Chief of the General Staff
- In office 28 November 2018 – 14 March 2020
- Preceded by: Alan Geder
- Succeeded by: Robert Glavaš

Personal details
- Born: 1 March 1964 (age 62)
- Children: 3
- Education: Royal College of Defence Studies; King's College

Military service
- Branch/service: Slovenian Ground Force
- Years of service: 1991–present
- Rank: Major General
- Commands: 5. Intelligence and Reconnaissance Battalion

Alenka Ermenc, born 5 September 1963, is an officer in the Slovenian Armed Forces who served as Chief of the General Staff. She was the first woman to hold the position of Chief of defence within NATO forces.

== Military career ==
Ermenc's military career started when she became a member of the Slovenian Territorial Defence forces in Slovenia's independence war from Yugoslavia in 1991.

In January 2006 she commanded the newly created 5. Intelligence and Reconnaissance Battalion of the Slovenian Armed Forces, becoming the first female commander of a battalion of the Slovenian Armed Forces. In May 2009, she became head of personnel of the General Staff of the Slovenian Army before a six-month deployment to Kosovo as part of Kosovo Force, commencing in June of the same year.

She was promoted to the rank of Major General by President, Borut Pahor, on 23 November 2018 at the Presidential Palace.

Later that year, she became Chief of the General Staff, which made her the first woman to hold that position in Slovenia and in NATO. She was replaced by Robert Glavaš.

== Education ==
Ermenc graduated from the Royal College of Defence Studies in London and went on to complete a master's degree in International Studies at London's King's College.

== Private life ==
Ermenc is a mother of three. She is a volunteer with Malteška pomoč Slovenija (Maltese Help of Slovenia), a national chapter of Malteser International, an international non-governmental aid agency for humanitarian aid of the Sovereign Military Order of Malta.
