= Alan Geder =

Slovenian military officer

Major General Alan Geder
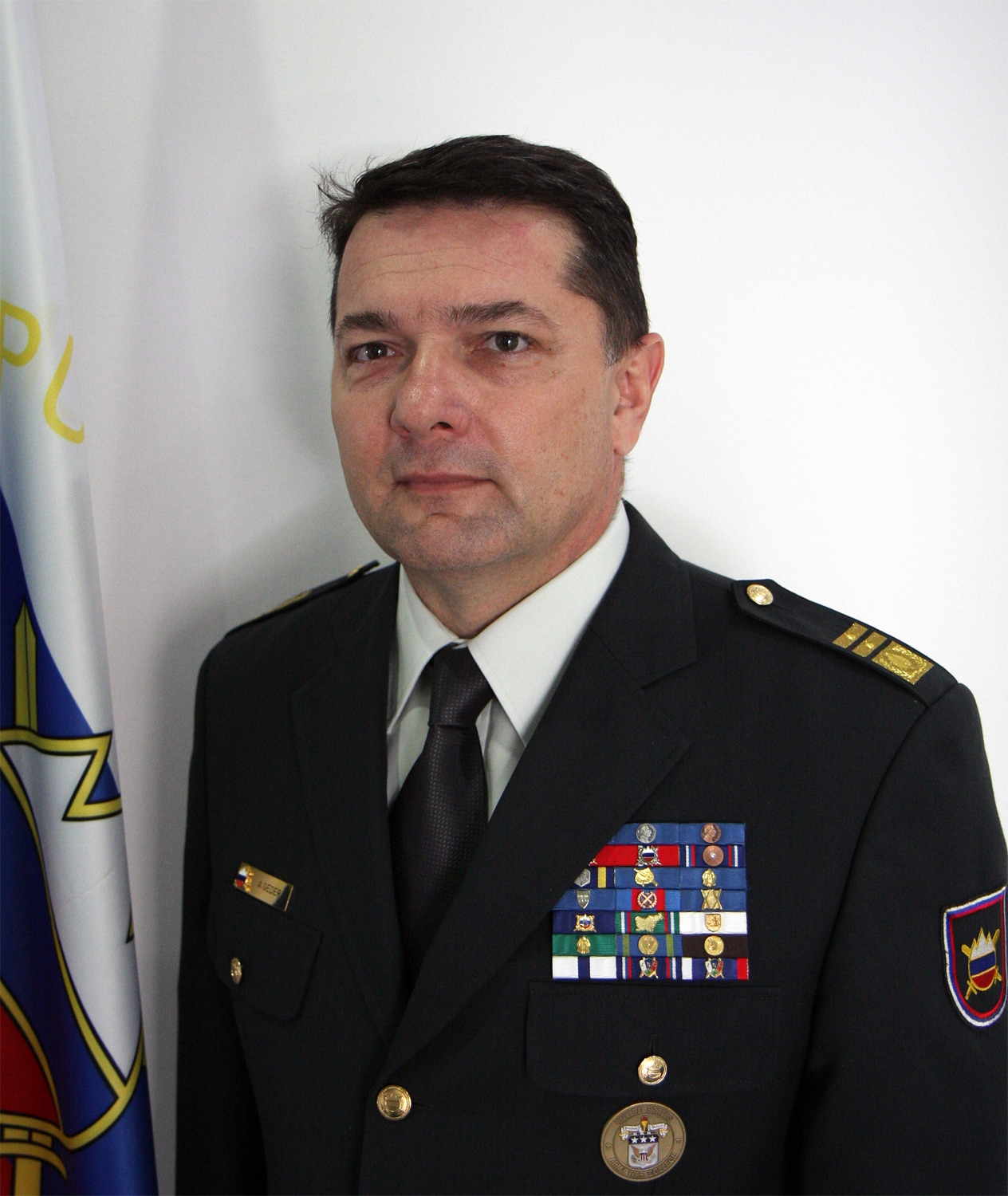

Chief of the General Staff of Slovenia
- In office 22 February 2018 – 28 November 2018
- Preceded by: Andrej Osterman
- Succeeded by: Alenka Ermenc

Personal details
- Born: 21 August 1958 (age 67) Lendava, Yugoslavia

Military service
- Allegiance: Slovenia
- Branch/service: Slovenian Territorial Defence; Slovenian Armed Forces
- Years of service: 1988 – present
- Rank: Major General
- Battles/wars: Ten-Day War

Major General Alan Geder (born 21 August 1958) is a military leader of Slovenia who served as a commander during the Slovenian War for Independence and acted as Chief of the General Staff in 2018.

== Biography ==
Geder was born on 21 August 1958 in Lendava, Yugoslavia. He would study in the faculty of sport at Ljubljana University between 1980 and 1984, before going on to joining the Territorial Defence of the Republic of Slovenia in 1988.

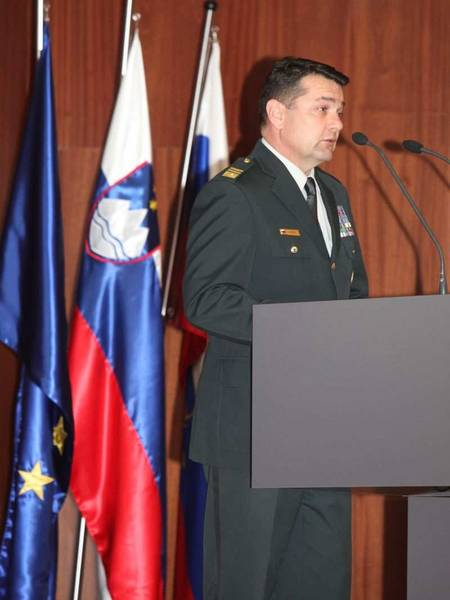
Alan Geder in 2010

In 1991, Geder actively participated in the Slovenian War for Independence, and serving as a commanding officer during the engagements in the area of Gederovci and Gornja Radgona. After the country gained independence, Geder would join the Slovenian Armed Forces.

From 2004 to 2005, Geder would study at the Army War College, in the United States, and in 2010 he would be promoted to a Major General. From 2011 to 2015 he would serve as a national military representative to NATO and the European Union.

Geder would become Slovenia's Chief of the General Staff on 22 February 2018; he would be replacing Andrej Osterman who was sacked after failing a NATO readiness test, who Geder was previously deputy to. While serving in this office, he would make a push to increase the salary of the armed forces after several years of budget cuts in the preceding years. This wage increase push came on the back of comments Geder made about staffing and equipment deficits the military was facing, during which he claimed that military needed an additional 1238 troops to meet staffing demands. He would also continue to work on displaying Slovenia's commitment to NATO, as showcased by his focus on NATO operations when he met with, then Chair of the NATO Military Committee, Petr Pavel. Geder would be replaced on 28 November 2018 by Alenka Ermenc, who became the first female Chief of the General Staff for a NATO country.
