= Robert Glavaš =

Slovenian Army Chief (born 1962)

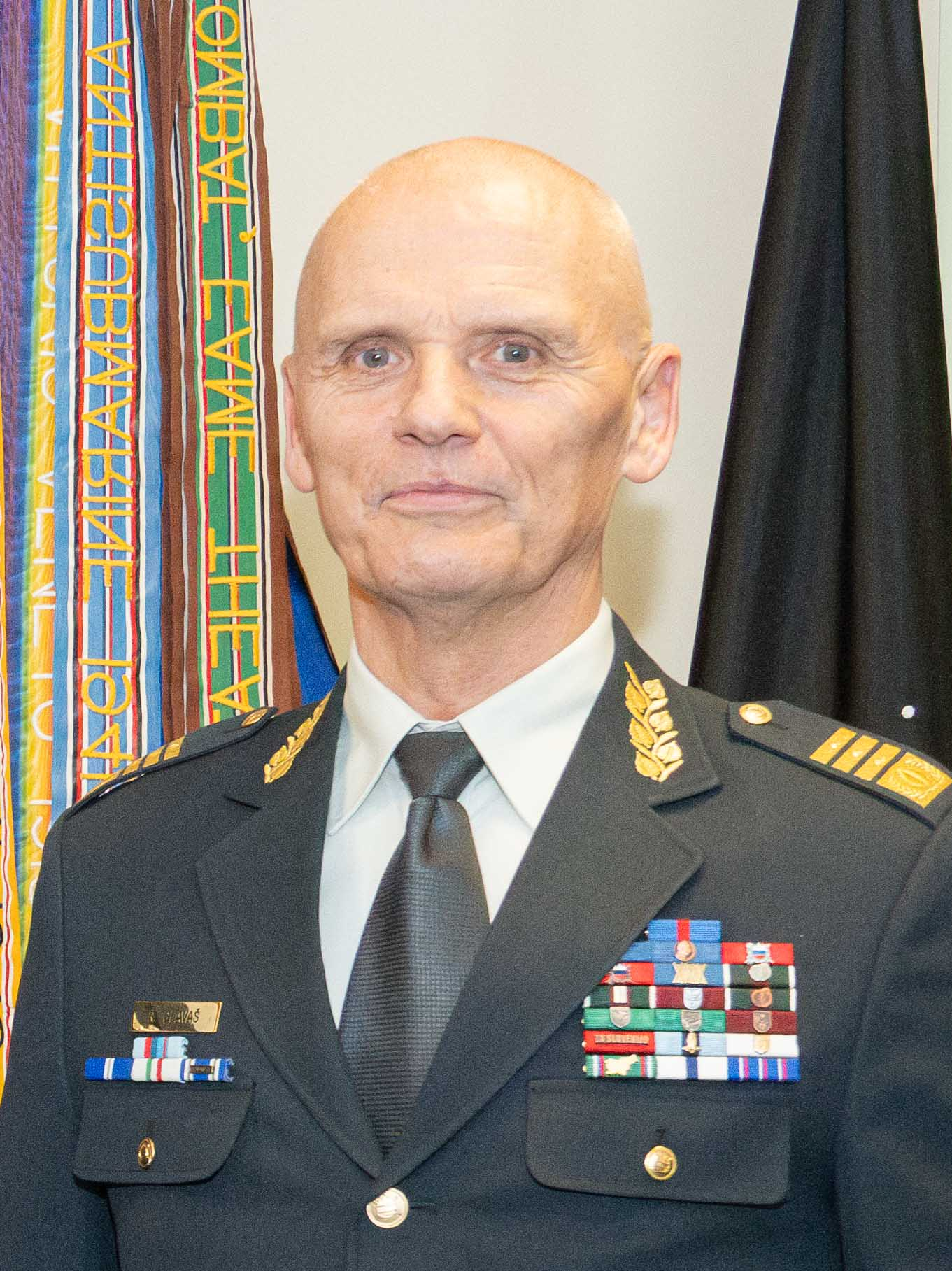
- Glavaš in 2024
- Born: August 9, 1962 (age 64)
- Education: University of Ljubljana
- Military career
- Allegiance: Republic of Slovenia
- Branch: Slovenian Ground Force
- Service years: 1991–2025
- Rank: Lieutenant colonel general
- Commands: Chairman of the General Staff; 1st Brigade of the Slovenian Armed Forces; Commander of the Combat Training Center; Commander of the Joint Operations Center
- Conflicts: International Security Assistance Force (Afghanistan); Kosovo Force (Kosovo); Slovenian Independence War (Slovenia)
- Awards: General Maister Silver Medal; General Maister Bronze Medal; Slovenian Armed Forces Silver Medal; Slovenian Armed Forces Bronze Medal

Robert Glavaš (born 1962) is a Slovenian Armed Forces lieutenant colonel general who served as Chief of the General Staff from 2020-2025. Prior to his appointment, Glavaš served as commander of the 1st Brigade of the Slovenian Armed Forces. He also commanded Slovenian forces in Afghanistan and held other commanding posts within the armed forces.

== Military career ==
Robert Glavaš has been employed in the Slovenian Armed Forces since 1991. He began his military career at the Yugoslav People's Army Reserve Officer School in Zadar and later joined the Territorial Defense of the Republic of Slovenia. He specialized in transport sciences at the Faculty of Maritime Studies and Transport at the University of Ljubljana.

He participated in several international missions. He served as Deputy Chief of Staff for Support at the Regional Command KFOR-West forces in Kosovo, as Commander of the Slovenian ISAF contingent in Afghanistan, and as a mentor to the commander of the 207th Corps of the Afghan Army. He also led various NATO committees related to exercises and training.

Before being appointed Chief of the General Staff of the Slovenian Armed Forces, he served as Deputy Chief under Major General Alenka Ermenc. Prior to becoming Deputy Chief, he was the Commander of the 1st Brigade of the Slovenian Armed Forces.

In April 2020, the Government of the Republic of Slovenia appointed Glavaš as Chief of the General Staff of the Slovenian Armed Forces.

== Effective dates of promotion ==
Rank	Date
NATO OF-8; Lieutenant colonel general (Generalpodpolkovnik)	23 June 2023
NATO OF-7; Major General (Generalmajor)	14 December 2020
NATO OF-6; Brigadier General (Brigadir)	Unknown
NATO OF-5; Colonel (Polkovnik)	Unknown
NATO OF-4; Lieutenant colonel (Podpolkovnik)	Unknown
NATO OF-3; Major (Major)	Unknown
NATO OF-2; Major (Major)	Unknown
NATO OF-1; Senior lieutenant (Nadporočnik)	Unknown
NATO OF-1 lieutenant (Poročnik)	Unknown

== See also ==
- Slovenian Armed Forces
