= Chief of the General Staff (Slovenia) =

Chief of the General Staff of the Military of Slovenia

- Slovene: Načelnik Generalštaba
- Standard of the Chief of the General Staff

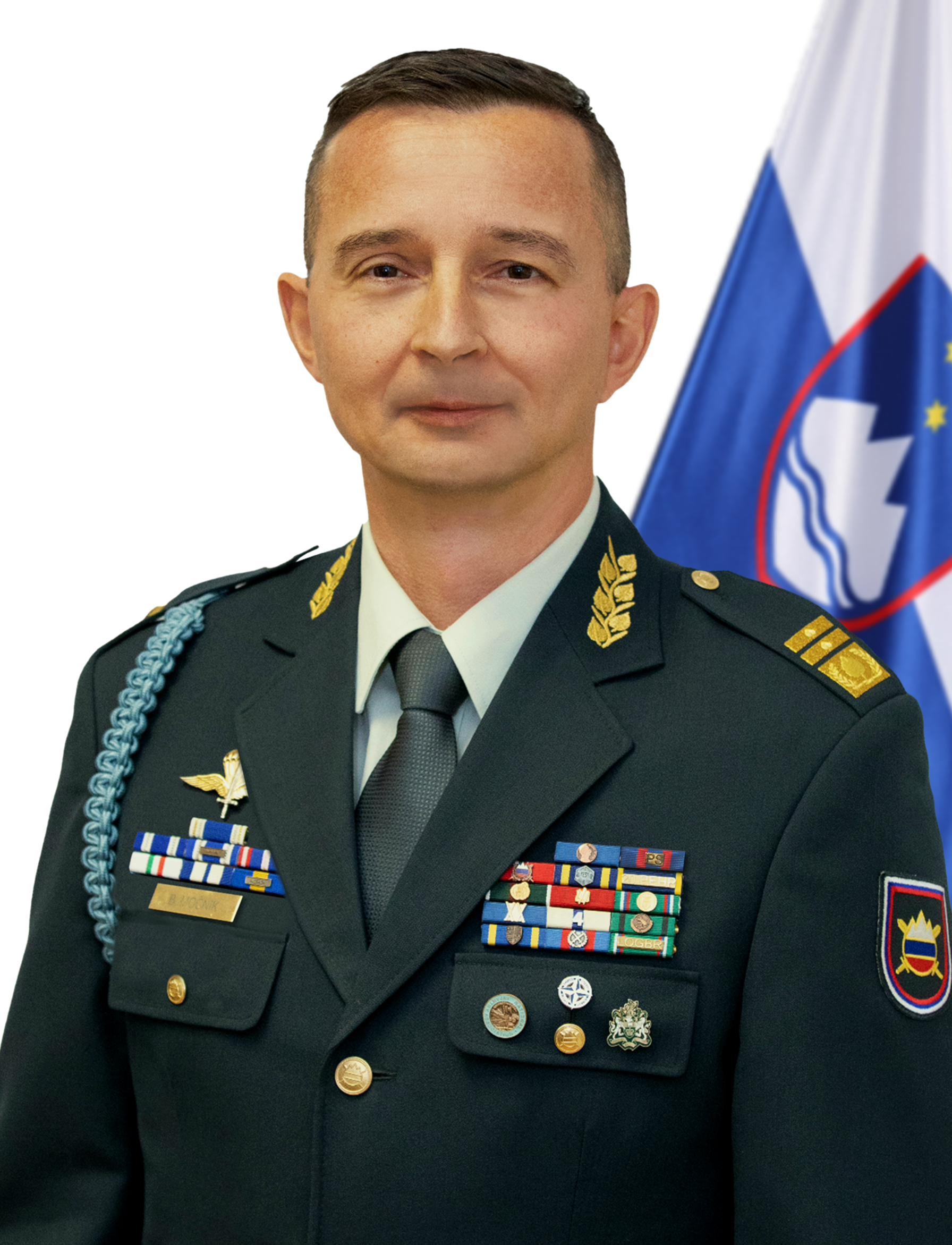
- Incumbent; Major general Boštjan Močnik since 15 December 2025
- Slovenian Armed Forces
- Reports to: Minister of Defence
- Nominator: Minister of Defence
- Appointer: Government
- Formation: 1990
- First holder: Major general Janez Slapar
- Website: Official website

The Chief of the General Staff (Slovene: Načelnik Generalštaba) is the Chief of the General Staff of the Slovenian Armed Forces. That person is appointed by the Government of Slovenia, after his/her nomination by the Minister of Defence. The current Chief of the General Staff is Major general Boštjan Močnik.

== List of chiefs of the general staff ==
=== Chief of the Republican Staff of the Slovenian Territorial Defence (1990–1993) ===
No.	Portrait	Chief of the Republican Staff	Took office	Left office	Time in office	Defence branch	Ref.
1	Janez Slapar	Major general Janez Slapar (born 1949)	1990	15 May 1993	2–3 years	Slovenian Territorial Defence	—

=== Chiefs of the General Staff of the Slovenian Armed Forces (1993–present) ===
No.	Portrait	Chiefs of the General Staff	Took office	Left office	Time in office	Defence branch	Ref.
1	Albin Gutman	Colonel general Albin Gutman (born 1947)	15 May 1993	9 April 1998	4 years, 329 days	Slovenian Ground Force	—
2	Iztok Podbregar [sl]	Lt. Col. General; Iztok Podbregar (born 1962)	9 April 1998	1 March 2001	2 years, 326 days	Slovenian Ground Force	—
3	Ladislav Lipič	Major general Ladislav Lipič (born 1951)	1 March 2001	1 June 2006	5 years, 92 days	Slovenian Ground Force	—
(1)	Albin Gutman	Colonel general Albin Gutman (born 1947)	1 June 2006	1 May 2009	2 years, 334 days	Slovenian Ground Force	—
4	Alojz Šteiner [sl]	Major general Alojz Šteiner (born 1957)	1 May 2009	27 February 2012	2 years, 302 days	Slovenian Ground Force	—
5	Dobran Božič [sl]	Major general Dobran Božič (born 1964)	27 February 2012	12 October 2014	2 years, 227 days	Slovenian Ground Force	—
6	Andrej Osterman	Major general Andrej Osterman (born 1960)	13 October 2014	22 February 2018	3 years, 133 days	Slovenian Ground Force	
7	Alan Geder	Major general Alan Geder (born 1958)	22 February 2018	28 November 2018	279 days	Slovenian Ground Force	
8	Alenka Ermenc	Major general Alenka Ermenc (born 1963)	28 November 2018	14 March 2020	1 year, 107 days	Slovenian Ground Force	
–	Robert Glavaš	Major general Robert Glavaš (born 1962); Acting	14 March 2020	20 April 2020	37 days	Slovenian Ground Force	
9	Robert Glavaš	Lieutenant colonel general Robert Glavaš (born 1962)	20 April 2020	15 December 2025	5 years, 239 days	Slovenian Ground Force	
10	Boštjan Močnik	Major general Boštjan Močnik (born 1974)	15 December 2025	Incumbent	296 days	Slovenian Ground Force	

== See also ==
- Slovenian Territorial Defence
- Slovenian Armed Forces
