= Andrej Osterman =

Slovenian officer

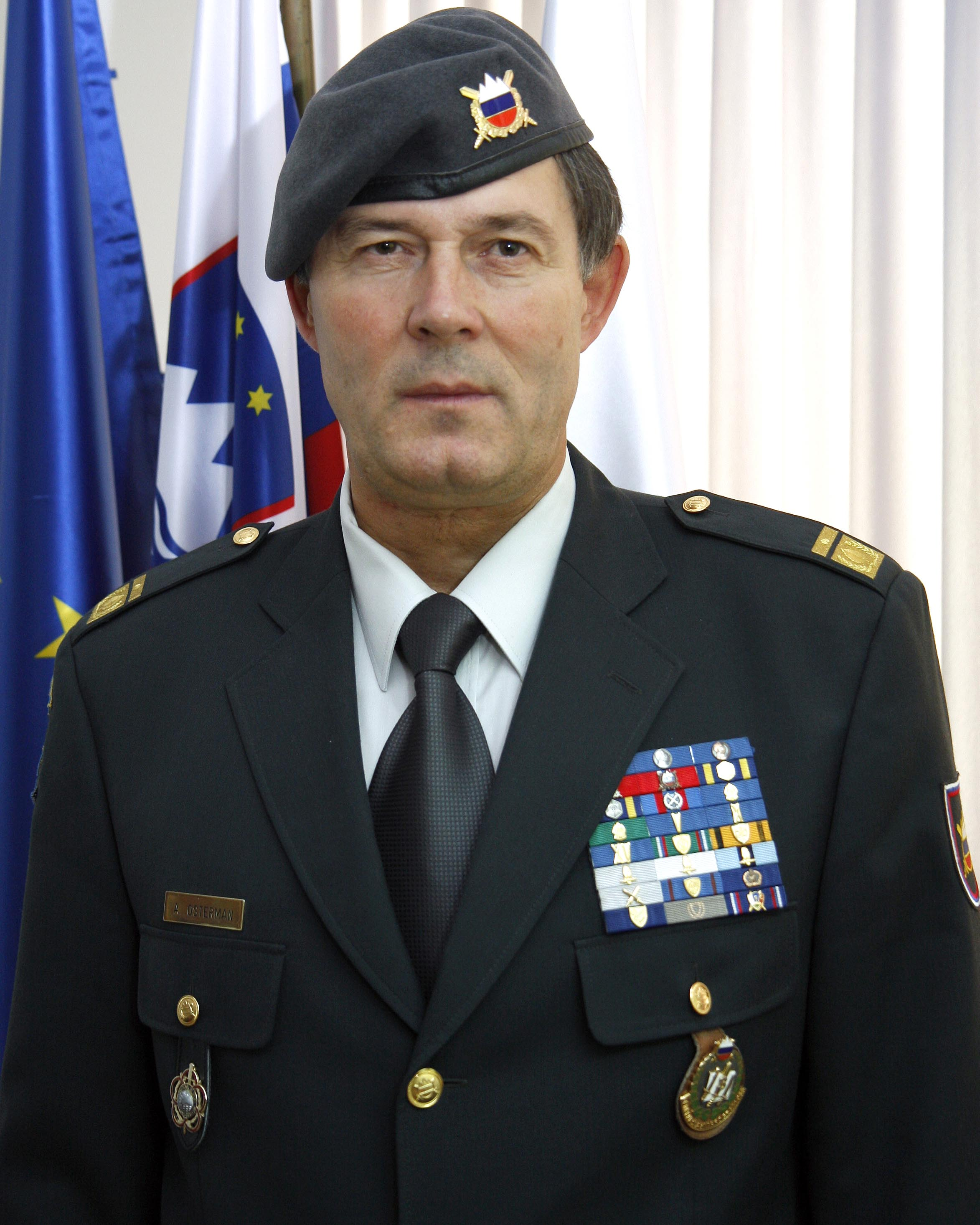
Andrej Osterman

Andrej Osterman (born October 4, 1960 in Kranj) is the 25th Commander-in-General of the Slovenian Army.

On April 10, 2012, Osterman became the deputy chief of the General Staff of the Slovenian Armed Forces, succeeding Dobran Božič. He assumed the position of Chief of the General Staff on October 13, 2014. On November 23, 2014, President Borut Pahor promoted him to the rank of Major General.

On February 13, 2018, a test of the combat readiness of the Slovenian Armed Forces was conducted at Poček using the NATO CERVAL method. The tested battalion combat group received a negative assessment. In response, on February 22, 2018, the Slovenian government relieved Andrej Osterman of his duties. He was succeeded by his former deputy, Alan Geder.
