= Srečko Lisjak =

Slovenian colonel

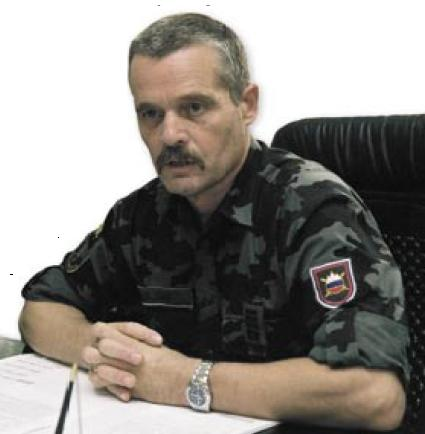
- Srečko Lisjak
- Born: Ljubljana
- Military career
- Allegiance: Slovenian Army
- Rank: Colonel
- Conflicts: Slovenian Independence War

Srečko Lisjak is a Slovenian colonel who came to prominence during the Slovenian Independence War. Having received 11 various military awards and honours, Lisjak is known as the most commended member among the veterans of the Slovenian Army who participated in the Slovenian Territorial Defence during the Slovenian Independence War in 1991. Currently, he is the commander of the Ten-Day War veteran-association.
