= Lisjak =

Lisjak is a Croatian and Slovenian surname. It may refer to:

- Ivana Lisjak (born 1987), Croatian tennis player
- Robert Lisjak, (born 1978), Croatian footballer
- Srečko Lisjak, Slovenian general
- Vlado Lisjak (born 1962), Croatian wrestler
