= List of Slovenian diplomats =

A list of notable diplomats from Slovenia:

== B ==
- Katja Boh

== C ==
- Izidor Cankar
- Philipp von Cobenzl

== D ==
- Mojca Drčar Murko

== H ==
- Sigismund von Herberstein
- Ivan Hribar

== J ==
- Iztok Jarc

== K ==
- Roman Kirn
- Ciril Kotnik
- Alojzij Kuhar

== L ==
- Ladislav Lipič

== M ==
- Dragutin Mate

== N ==
- Anton Novačan

== P ==
- Ernest Petrič
- Janko Pleterski

== R ==
- Dimitrij Rupel

== Š ==
- Matjaž Šinkovec

== T ==
- Danilo Türk
- Ludvik Toplak

== V ==
- Bogumil Vošnjak

== Ž ==
- Samuel Žbogar
