= Janez Slapar =

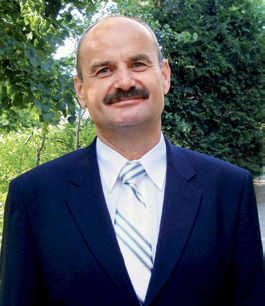
Official portrait.

Janez Slapar (born September 26, 1949, in Tržič) was a Slovenian general and veteran of the Ten-Day War as the first and only Chief of the Republican Staff of the Slovenian Territorial Defence, serving from 1990 to 15 May 1993. Slapar is currently the president of the Slovenian Shooting Association.

== Early life ==
Slapar was born in 1949 in Pristava near Tržiču, into a working-class family of four. After finishing high school in Kranj, he began studying mathematics. After he failed his first physics exam, he dropped out and joined the army. He served in the Yugoslav People's Army in Bileča, at the reserve officers' school. When he returned home, he took control of the Tržič People's Defense in Bileča in 1969, which was formed a year earlier. After four years of work in Tržič, he was invited to Kranj, to the zonal and later provincial headquarters. In 1977, he graduated from the Higher School of Administration. Between 1980 and 1988 he was the Chief of the Provincial Staff, and between 1988 and 1990 he was the Commander of the Territorial Defence of Gorenjska. On 28 September 1990, the Slovenian Presidency appointed Major Slapar as Acting Chief of the Republican Staff of the Slovenian Territorial Defence. In 2004 from the Faculty of Administration in Ljubljana.

== Awards and recognitions ==
- Order of General Maister, 1st Class with Swords (December 27, 1991)
- Order of Freedom of the Republic of Slovenia
- Memorial Sign Defending the Homeland 1991
- commemorative Sign "Chief of the Republic Staff TO 1991 (June 23, 1998)
- Commemorative Sign "Movements 1991" (September 23, 1997)
- Commemorative Sign "Republic Coordination 1991"
