= Ladislav Lipič =

Slovenian major general

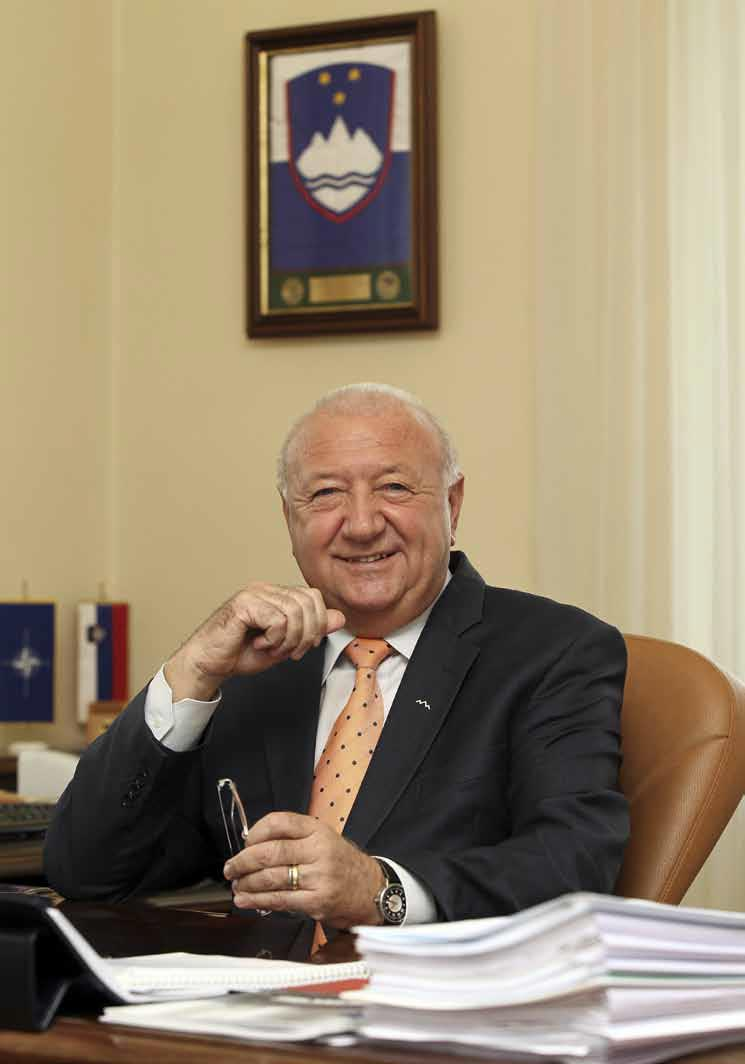
Ladislav Lipič in 2012

Ladislav Lipič (born 30 November 1951 in Murska Sobota) is a Slovene major general, who in his career was:

- Deputy Chief of the General Staff of the Slovenian Armed Forces (1 December 2000 – January 2001);
- State Secretary at the Ministry of Defence of the Republic of Slovenia (January - 1 March 2001);
- Chief of the General Staff of the Slovenian Armed Forces (from 1 March 2001 to 2006);
- Ambassador Extraordinary and Plenipotentiary of the Republic of Slovenia to the Republic of Hungary and the Republic of Bulgaria with its seat in Budapest (2006–2008)
- Adviser to the President of the Republic Slovenia (Danilo Türk) on defence matters (5 December 2008 – 2012).

He is also a veteran of the Slovenian War.

== Orders and decorations ==
Slovenia

- Gold Medal of General Maister with Swords
- Gold Medal of General Maister
- Gold Medal of the Slovenian Armed Forces
- Golden Order for Services in the Military or Security Field of the Republic of Slovenia

France

- Chevalier de la Légion d'Honneur

Hungary

- Knight of Hungarian Culture (2003)

USA

- Legion of Merit (2004)

== See also ==
- Military of Slovenia
