= Albin Gutman =

Slovene general

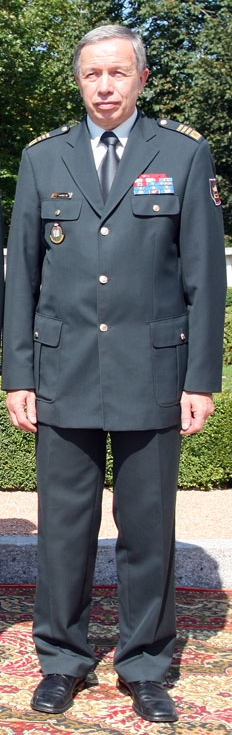
- Born: December 17, 1947 (age 78)
- Military career
- Rank: General
- Conflicts: Slovenian War

Albin Gutman (born 17 December 1947, in Novo Mesto) is a Slovene general, who was Chief of the General Staff of the Slovenian Armed Forces (from 1 July 2006 to 5 May 2009). He is the only person in history of Slovenian Armed Forces who was twice on this position (first mandate was from 1993 to 1998).

He is also a veteran of the Slovenian War.
