= Boštjan Močnik =

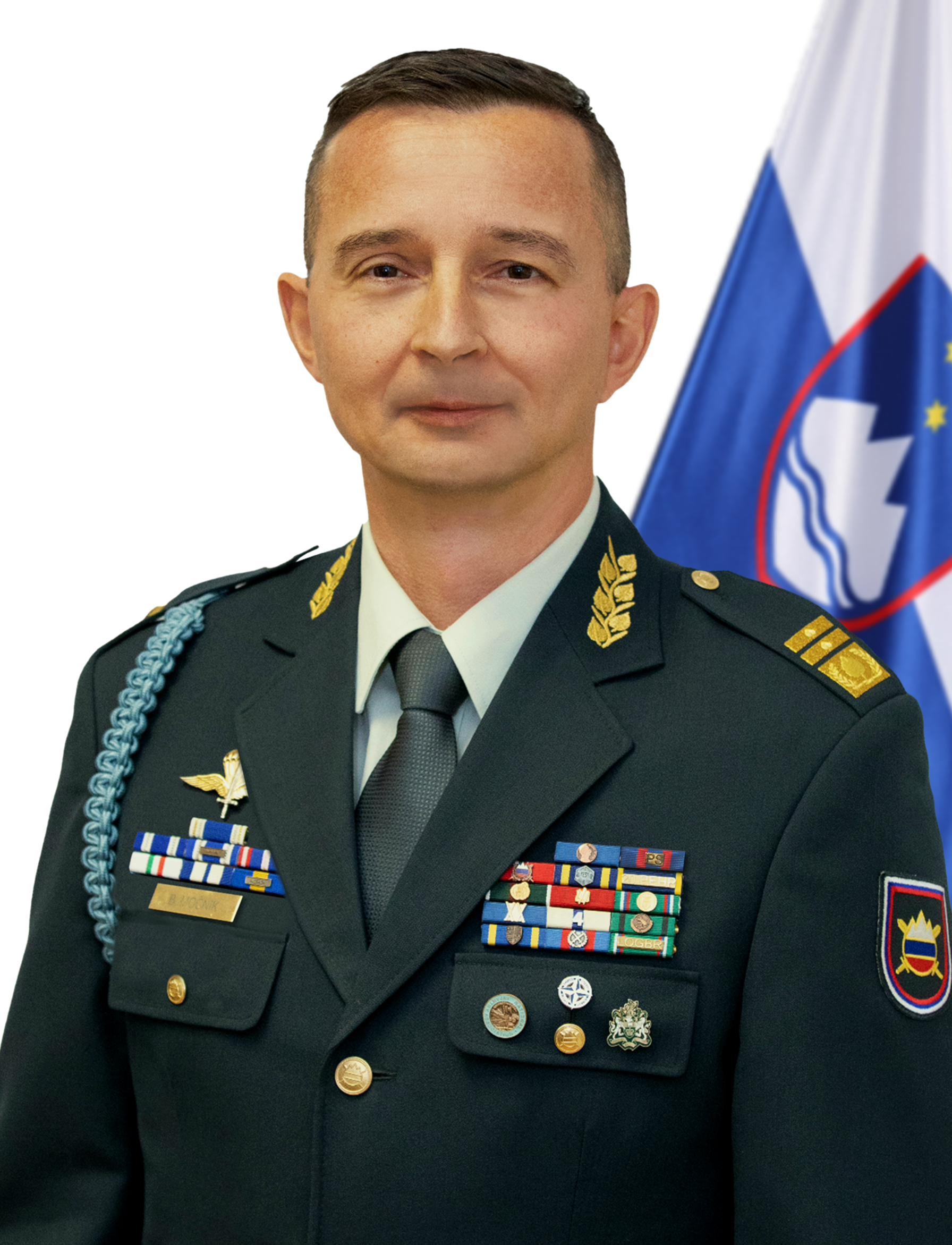
Official portrait.

Boštjan Močnik (born 2 July 1974) is a Slovenian Armed Forces Major general who served as Chief of the General Staff since 2025.

== Military career ==
Močnik joined the Slovenian Armed Forces in 1998 as a scholarship holder as a graduate of the Faculty of Social Sciences at the University of Ljubljana. In 2000, he was promoted to second lieutenant, in 2001 he became deputy company commander of the 20th Motorized Battalion (today the 20th Light Infantry Battalion), and in 2007 his executive officer. In 2013, he became commander of the 20th Infantry Regiment, and in 2015, commander of the 72nd Brigade, and was promoted to colonel. His international operational experience includes deployments to Kosovo (Kosovo Force), Afghanistan (International Security Assistance Force) and Bosnia and Herzegovina (Operation Althea). In 2017, he served as Chief of the Multilateral Division, the Chief of the Capability Development Division a year later, and Chief of the Strategic Planning Section a year later. In 2020, he became commander of the 1st Brigade. In 2021, he was promoted to brigadier. He served as Force Commander in 2023. On 15 December 2025, he assumed the duties of Chief of the General Staff of the Slovenian Armed Forces upon the retirement of his predecessor, Robert Glavaš. Močnik was promoted to major general in January 2026.

== Education ==
- International Security and Strategic Leadership at the Royal College of Defence Studies
- Security and Strategy for Global Leaders at King's College

== Awards ==
- NATO Meritorious Service Medal
- Meritorious Service Medal of the Colorado National Guard
- Distinguished Honor Order of Saint Maurice-Pelegrinus from the American National Infantry Association

== See also ==
- Slovenian Armed Forces
