= FN F2000 =

Belgian bullpup assault rifle

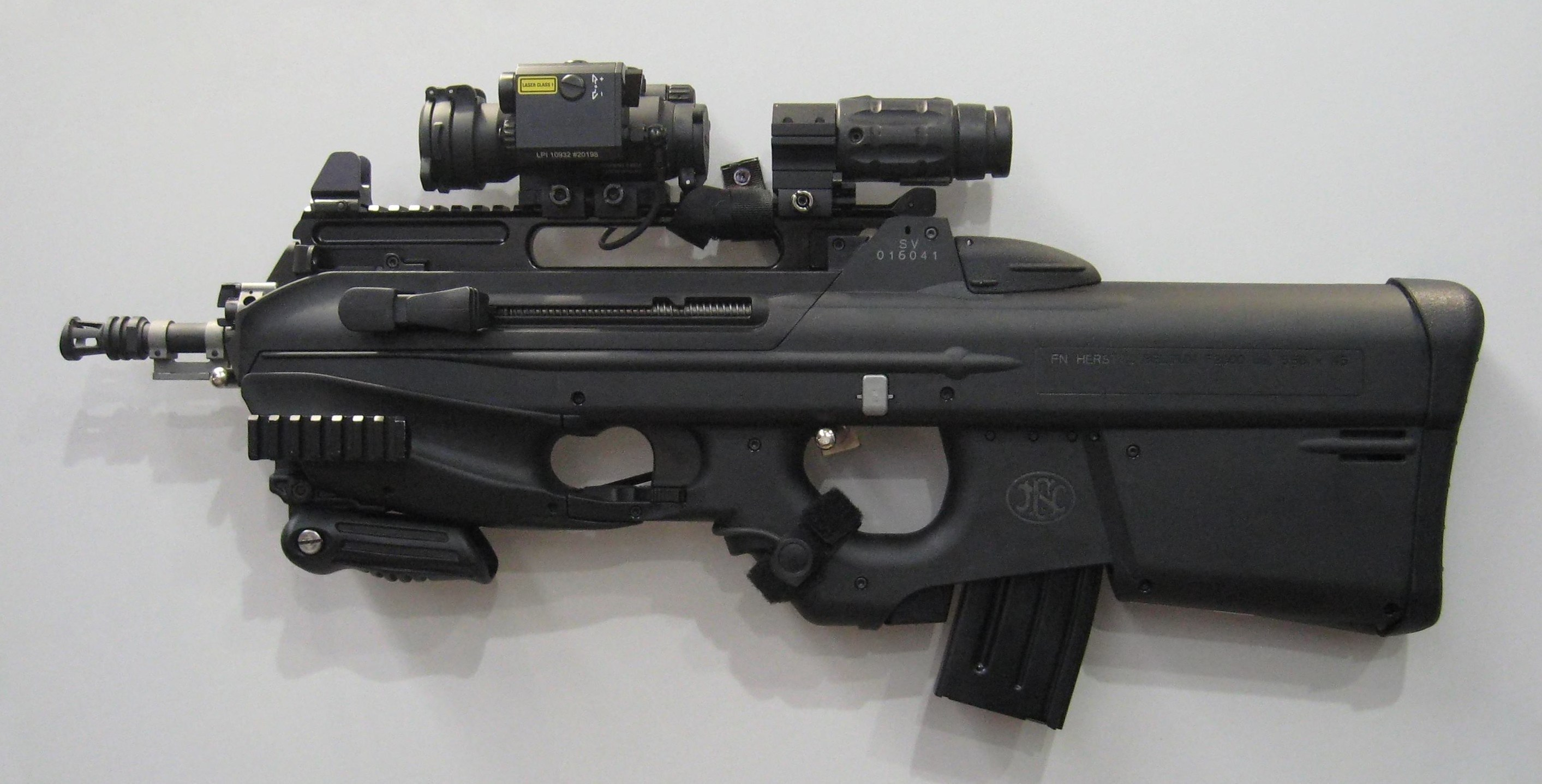
- F2000 S of the Slovenian Army
- Type: Bullpup assault rifle Semi-automatic rifle (FS2000)
- Place of origin: Belgium

Service history
- In service: 2001–present
- Used by: See Users
- Wars: See Conflicts

Production history
- Designed: 1995–2001
- Manufacturer: FN Herstal
- Produced: 2001–present
- Variants: See Variants: F2000; F2000 Tactical; FS2000; F2000 S

Specifications
- Mass: 3.6 kg (7.9 lb) (F2000); 3.39 kg (7.5 lb) (F2000 Tactical); 3.65 kg (8.0 lb) (FS2000); 3.44 kg (7.6 lb) (FS2000 Tactical)
- Length: 688 mm (27.1 in) (F2000); 688 mm (27.1 in) (F2000 Tactical); 744 mm (29.3 in) (FS2000); 744 mm (29.3 in) (FS2000 Tactical)
- Barrel length: 400 mm (16 in) (F2000); 400 mm (16 in) (F2000 Tactical); 443 mm (17.4 in) (FS2000); 443 mm (17.4 in) (FS2000 Tactical)
- Width: 81.3 mm (3.20 in)
- Height: 259.1 mm (10.20 in)
- Cartridge: 5.56×45mm NATO
- Action: Gas-operated, rotating bolt
- Rate of fire: 850 rounds/min
- Muzzle velocity: 900 m/s (2,953 ft/s)
- Effective firing range: 500 m (550 yd)
- Maximum firing range: 900 m (980 yd)
- Feed system: Detachable box magazines; capacities: 10 rounds (restricted); 30 rounds (standard STANAG)
- Sights: 1.6× magnified telescopic sight, notch back-up sight

The FN F2000 is a 5.56×45mm NATO bullpup rifle, designed by FN Herstal in Belgium. Its compact bullpup design includes a telescopic sight, a non-adjustable fixed notch and front blade secondary sight. The weapon has fully ambidextrous controls, allowed by a unique ejection system, ejecting spent cartridge casings forward and to the right side of the weapon, through a tube running above the barrel. The F2000 made its debut in March 2001 at the IDEX defence exhibition held in Abu Dhabi, in the United Arab Emirates.

== Design details ==
The F2000 is a modular weapon system; its principal component is a compact 5.56×45mm NATO-caliber assault rifle in a bullpup configuration. The F2000 is a selective fire weapon operating from a closed bolt.

The rifle consists of two main assemblies: the barreled receiver group and the frame, coupled together by means of an axis pin located above the trigger guard. The barrel group has an integral MIL-STD-1913 Picatinny rail used to mount optical sights. The frame or lower receiver contains the trigger group, the bolt and bolt carrier assembly, return mechanism and magazine well. A removable handguard is installed in front of the trigger which completes and encloses the trigger guard.

=== Features ===
The F2000 is a gas-operated, fully automatic and ambidextrous bullpup rifle. Both the safety system and trigger mechanism were adopted from the P90 personal defense weapon; the selector toggle is a rotating disc located below the trigger. The fire selector doubles as the weapon's manual safety and secures the firearm against accidental discharge (the selector/safety disc has 3 settings: "S" safe, "1" semi-automatic mode, "A" fully automatic fire). The "safe" setting disables the trigger. The hammers, group pins, and springs are steel while all other components are nylon injection molding. The shell of the rifle is made of composite materials.

The F2000 is fed from standard NATO box magazines (STANAG 4179) with a 30-round cartridge capacity using 5.56×45mm ammunition. The magazine catch/release button is installed symmetrically in the pistol grip, in front of the magazine; the magazine catch is operated by an oversized actuator useful when wearing NBC gloves. The F2000 is not configured from the factory to have a drop-free magazine system due to the friction from the removable dust gaskets. The magazine needs to be pulled out manually.

The rifle does not have a hold-open device; the bolt does not stay back after the last round is fired. The charging handle is placed on the left side of the receiver, just above the hand guard, and can be operated by left-handed shooters. There are no access points for the possible ingress of dirt or debris; the charging handle slot is sealed.

The weapon's primary sight is a telescopic sight with a fixed 1.6× magnification (the reticle also enables use in low-light conditions) contained in a plastic housing above the receiver (mounted on the MIL-STD-1913 rail), the secondary sight is a non-adjustable fixed notch and front blade, molded into the optical sight housing cover. The sight cover and sight module can be quickly removed to reveal the Picatinny rail.

The rifle's chromed hammer-forged steel barrel is stated to retain accuracy after 20,000 normal (non-sustained) rounds. The barrel also features a flash suppressor with an angled cut at the tip which directs the muzzle blast upward, compensating for muzzle rise. The F2000 has an optional bayonet lug mounted near the muzzle, and an adjustable gas regulator with two settings: "normal" for standard ammunition meeting NATO specifications, and "adverse", used to send an increased volume of gas into the system to ensure proper functioning when fouled or when using low-pressure ammunition.

=== Operating mechanism ===
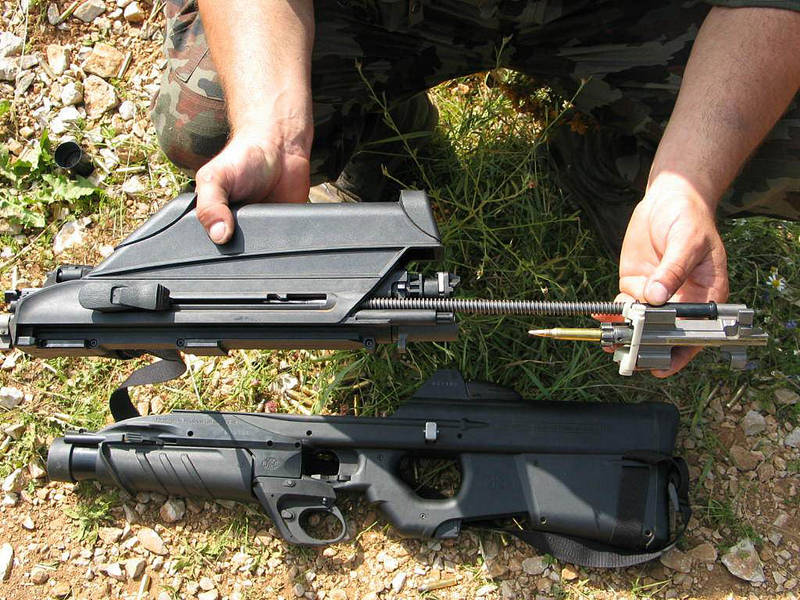
Partial disassembly (cartridge on bolt face)

This selective fire weapon is a gas-operated design utilizing a short-stroke piston system driven by propellant gases diverted into the gas cylinder through a port in the barrel; it fires from a closed bolt position. The weapon is locked with a rotating bolt which features 6 radial locking lugs, a spring-powered extractor and ejector. The chamber, bolt, and ejector mechanism can be accessed by flipping up a hinged inspection cover in the receiver, behind the optical sight housing.

short-stroke gas piston

The F2000 uses a unique ejection system, ejecting spent cartridge casings forward and to the right side of the weapon, through a tube running above the barrel. This method of ejection provides for fully ambidextrous operation; the rifle can be used without any modification by both right and left-handed shooters. This ejection pattern was achieved by using a swiveling polymer tray, which intercepts the empty casing from the bolt face immediately after disengaging from the extractor. As the empty casing is extracted it is held while the rocker assembly tilts to lift it above and clear of the feed path as the next round is stripped from the magazine by the bolt head. The casing is fed into the tray located in a cavity in the receiver wall, which then pivots the cartridge case and directs it into a chute (above the barrel); the case is discarded from the tilting tray by being impacted by a pin on the moving bolt carrier upon its forward return. Only when the ejection tube contains more than five cases is the first of them ejected forward through a port just behind and to the right of the muzzle. Any cases remaining after firing has ceased, can be cleared by tilting the rifle muzzle down.

This system is patent protected (patent number 5675924 dated 14 October 1997 by René Predazzer and patent 6389725 from February 25, 2000, author Charles Denuit). The ambidexterity provided by forward ejection is its most obvious benefit, and removes many of the tactical and user difficulties (such as lack of ambidexterity, and gas and debris released in close proximity to the shooter's face, as in the SA80 or OC-14) that bullpup designs usually create.

=== Grenade launcher ===
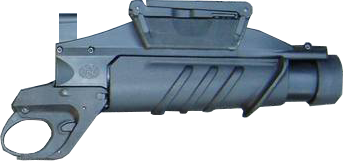
GL1 grenade launcher, not mounted

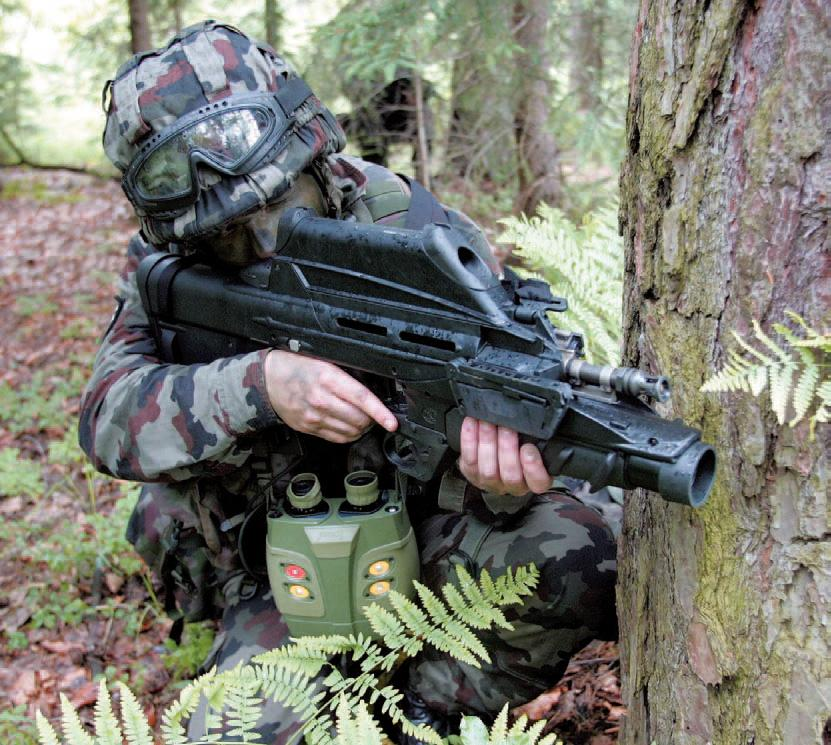
GL1 mounted on F2000

One of the modules developed for the F2000 system is a proprietary lightweight 40 mm underslung GL1 grenade launcher (empty weight 1 kg) that uses standard low-velocity 40×46mm grenades. The launcher is a single-shot breech-loaded reverse pump-action weapon with a barrel that slides forward for loading and unloading (like the M203 grenade launcher), locked by axial rotation of the barrel.

The grenade launcher's trigger is installed directly under the F2000's trigger so that it can be manipulated without removing the shooting hand from the rifle's pistol grip. The double-action trigger lets the operator "try again" if the grenade's percussion type primer doesn't ignite. The breech release button is found on the left side of the launcher body, like on the M203. The grenade launcher comes with a basic flip-up ladder sight, but it was intended to be used with a specially designed optoelectronic fire control system designated FCS, developed in cooperation with the Finnish company Noptel.

The aiming module is installed in place of the standard optical sight and becomes the weapon's primary sight when mounted, but its main purpose is to accurately determine and indicate the range of a grenade target. The module is powered by a 9 V battery pack, installed in the stock, behind the magazine well. The power pack is also intended to power any other tactical accessories or systems that could be introduced. The FCS integrates a low-power laser rangefinder (precise to within ± 1 m), a day-time aiming channel with an electronically projected reticle, a measured range display reading and a diode elevation adjustment indicator.

The fire control system calculates a firing solution manifested by the barrel's angle of elevation using target range information from the laser rangefinder (the rangefinder is activated by pushing a button on the pistol grip, below the trigger), corrected manually by the shooter through a push-button interface (add/subtract buttons) on the FCS top cover to take account for head or tail winds that could affect the desired range. The F2000 FCS also contains software with the ballistic properties of up to six types of 40 mm grenades and can be reprogrammed to take advantage of future munition improvements. Batteries for the FCS are located in the bottom of the buttstock.

After obtaining a range measurement, the distance to the target is displayed on a liquid crystal screen and the elevation diode flashes red. Once a correct elevation has been achieved by tilting the rifle, the diode changes color to green indicating the weapon is ready to fire.

== Variants ==
=== F2000 Tactical ===
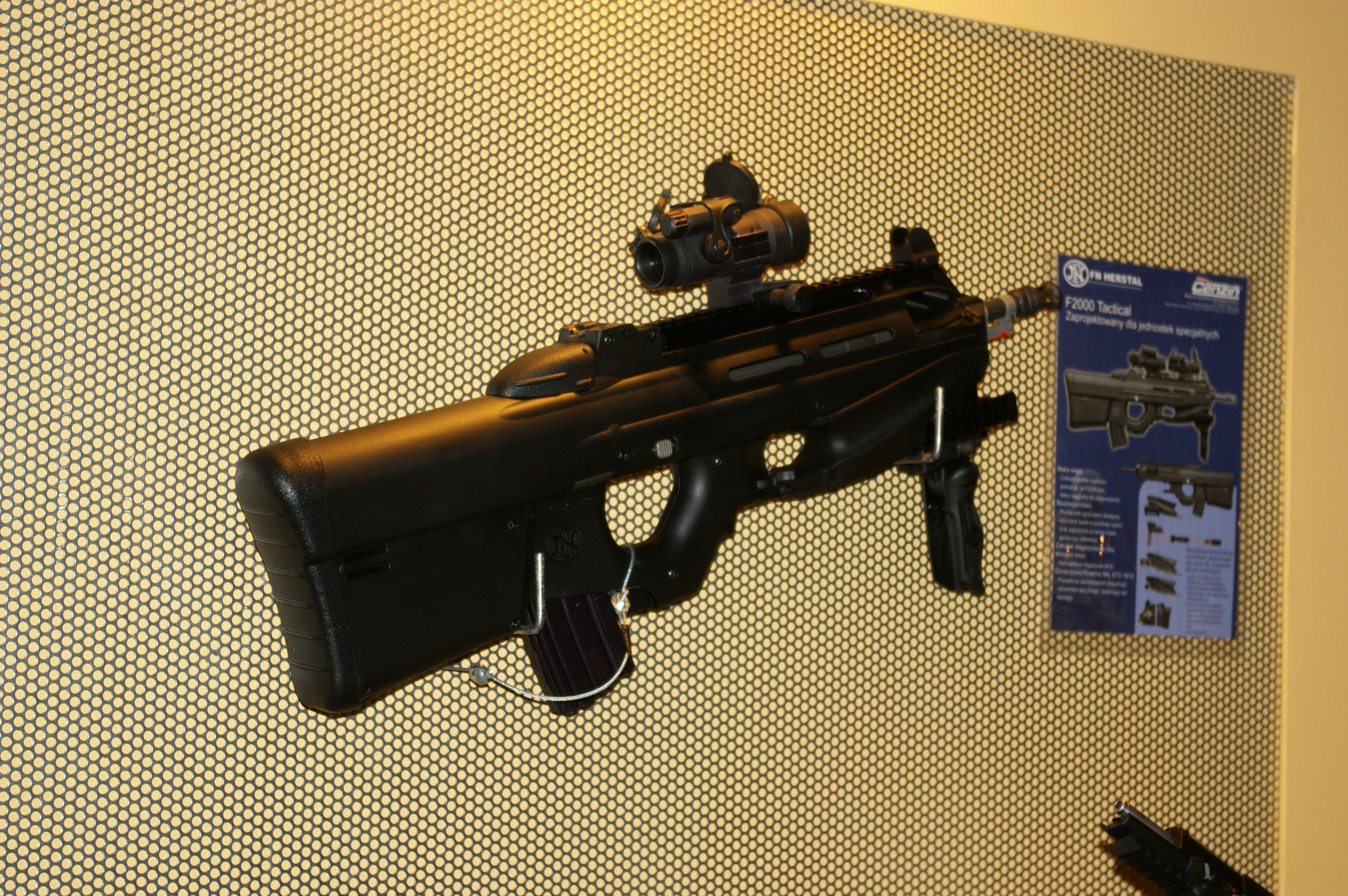
F2000 Tactical

The F2000 Tactical railed variant is similar to the standard model, but it lacks the integrated optical sight, instead being replaced by an extended top receiver MIL-STD-1913 rail with flip-up iron sights allowing for picatinny rail accessories to be fitted.

=== F2000 Tactical TR ===
The F2000 Tactical TR variant is similar to the F2000 Tactical model, but includes a triple rail handguard for add-on accessories.

=== FS2000 ===
Intended for civilian ownership, the FS2000 is a semi-automatic version of the F2000 that first became available in June 2006. The FS2000 Tactical model is equipped with an extended barrel with a permanently attached muzzle brake and a 1:7 in right hand twist rifling rate; the bayonet lug was not included on the FS2000 rifles. The lower hand guard can be removed in the same manner as the F2000 to accept the same variety of accessories. It comes with a Picatinny rail optic rail along with backup iron sights. The rear flip-up National Match-sized aperture is adjustable for windage, while the removable front sight is adjustable for elevation. A small number of the early models featured a stepped barrel contour as well as a demilled bayonet lug. Measurements on the stepped barrel's rifling were as long as the non-stepped barrel, revealing that the stepped barrel is not simply a shorter F2000 military barrel with an extended muzzle brake which is similar to the PS90.

A variant of the FS2000, called the FS2000 Standard, is equipped with the factory F2000 1.6× magnification optic and sight cover.

=== F2000 S ===
A version of the F2000 modified for the Slovenian Army. It incorporates an elevated upper Picatinny rail that also doubles as a carrying handle.

== Conflicts ==
The FN F2000 has been used in the following conflicts:

- War in Afghanistan (2001–2021)
- Insurgency in Khyber Pakhtunkhwa
- Operation Astute
- Mexican drug war
- Libyan Civil War
- Yemeni Civil War (2014-present)
- Saudi Arabian-led intervention in Yemen
- Houthi–Saudi Arabian conflict
- Russian invasion of Ukraine

== Users ==
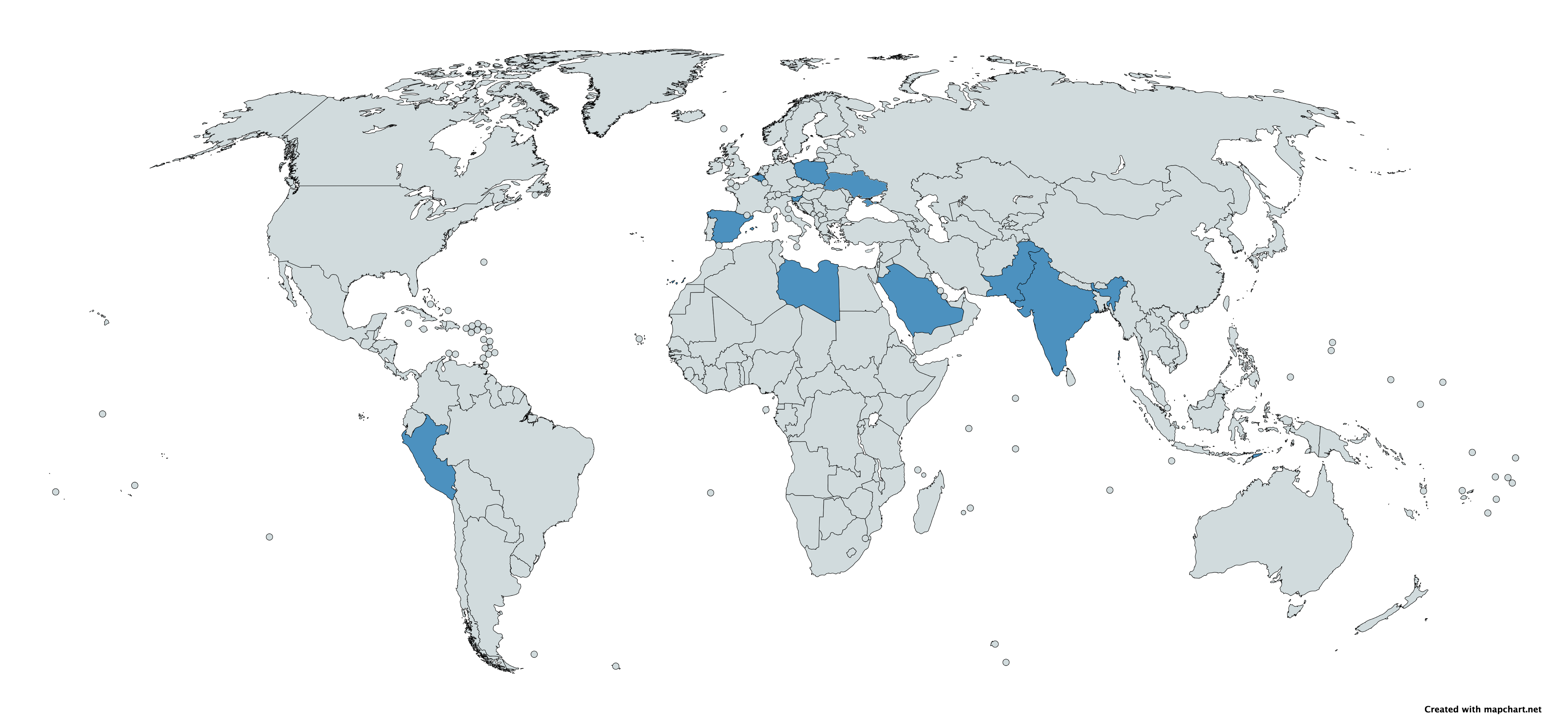
A map with FN F2000 users in blue

- Belgium: Used by the Special Forces Group of the Belgian Armed Forces Land Component.
- East Timor: In use with the National Police of East Timor.
- India: Used by the Special Protection Group and National Security Guard.
- Libya: Purchased 367 F2000 rifles along with other assorted lethal and non-lethal weapon systems from FN Herstal in 2008, and deliveries commenced in 2009. In the 2011 Libyan Civil War, Libyan rebel forces captured a number of these weapons from forces loyal to the Gaddafi government.
- Pakistan: Used by Special Service Wing (SSW) and the Pakistan Army.
- Peru: Special forces and the Peruvian Marine Corps.
- Poland: In limited use by the GROM special forces group.
- Saudi Arabia: The Saudi Arabian National Guard purchased 55,000 rifles in 2005.
- Slovenia: In June 2006, the Slovenian Ministry of Defence signed a contract with FN Herstal involving the acquisition of 6,500 F2000 rifles as the new standard service rifle for the Slovenian Army (Slovenska vojska) along with the 40 mm GL1 grenade launcher. This is arguably the first confirmed large-scale adoption for this rifle by a European and NATO member country. The Slovenian army ultimately purchased 14,000 rifles. In the years 2023-25, it was decided that the Slovenian Armed Forces will adopt a new standard assault rifle. The new rifle is the FN SCAR. The F2000S is expected to go into reserve use. The first new rifles arrived in 2025.
- Spain: Used by G.E.O, the Spanish National Police Special Operations group. Many of them are equipped with the GL1 grenade launcher.
- Ukraine: Donated in 2022 by Belgium as a response for the Russian invasion of Ukraine.

=== Non-state actors ===
- Hamas: Used by the al-Quds Brigades, former Libyan stock.
- Houthis: Some known to be taken from abandoned Saudi military camps.

== Gallery ==
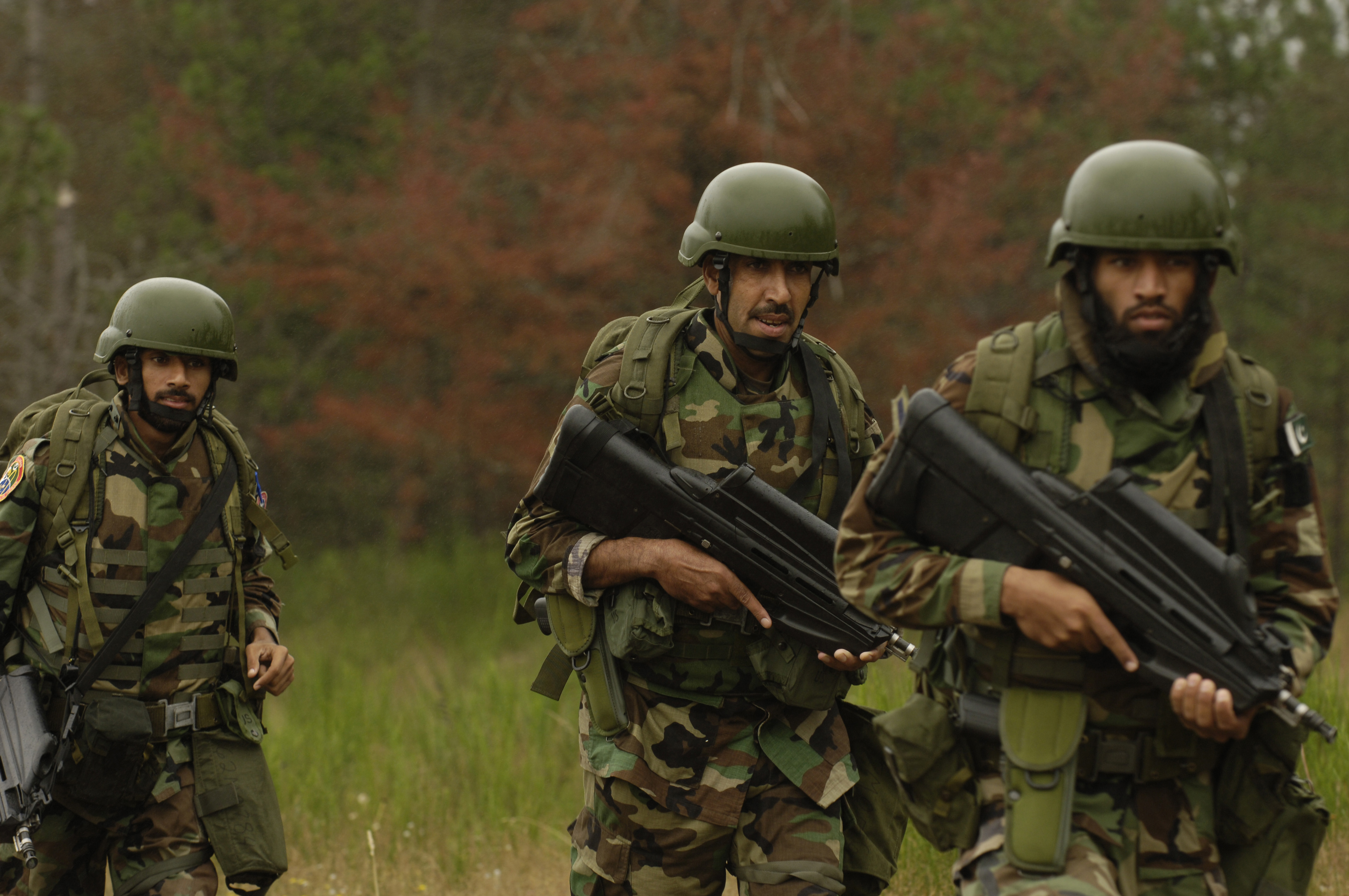
Members of the Special Service Wing (Pakistani Air Force) armed with F2000 rifles during a training exercise at Fort Lewis, Washington, US, July 23, 2007.

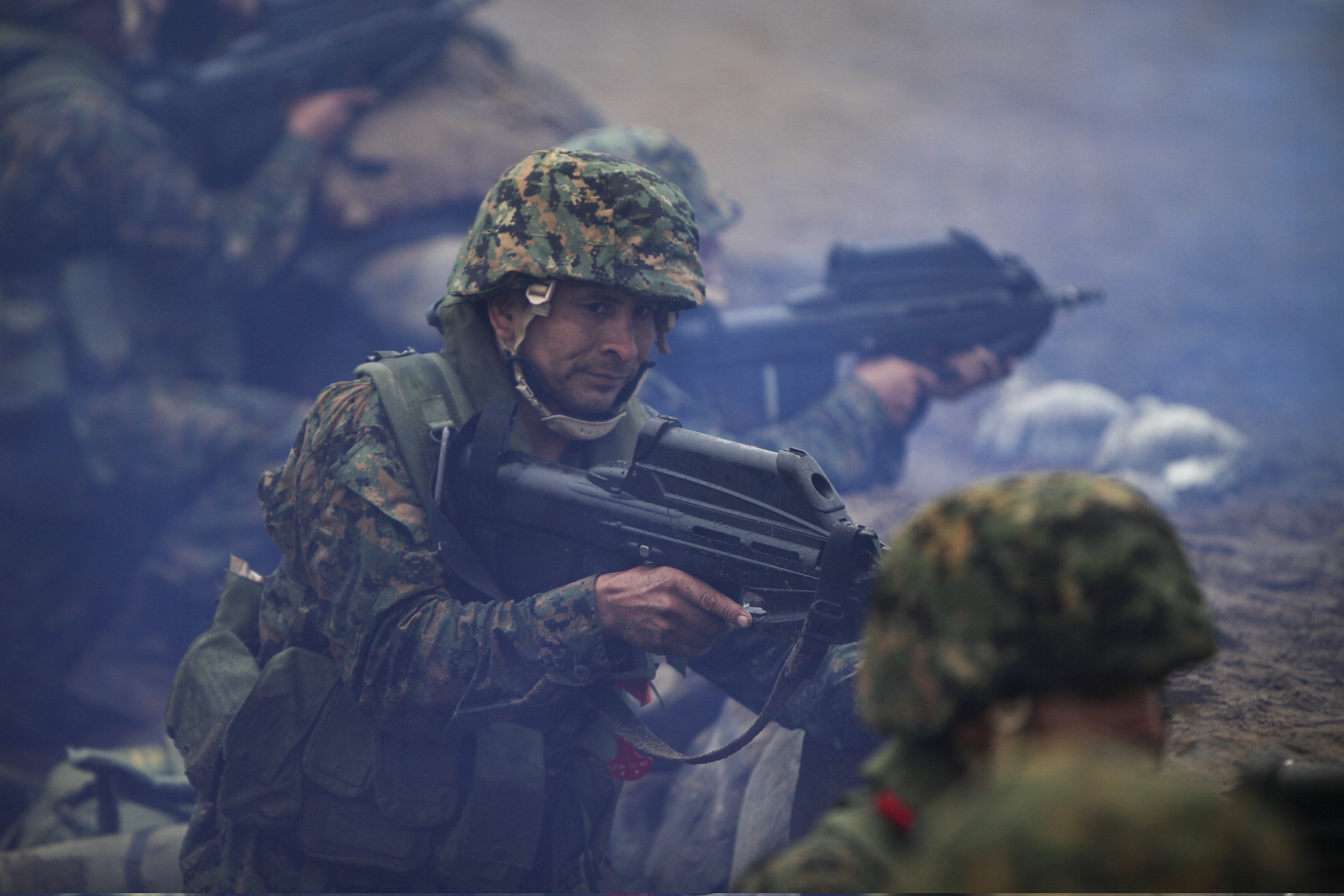
Peruvian marines carry F2000 assault rifles during a large-scale multinational amphibious beach assault in Ancon, Peru, 19 July 2010.

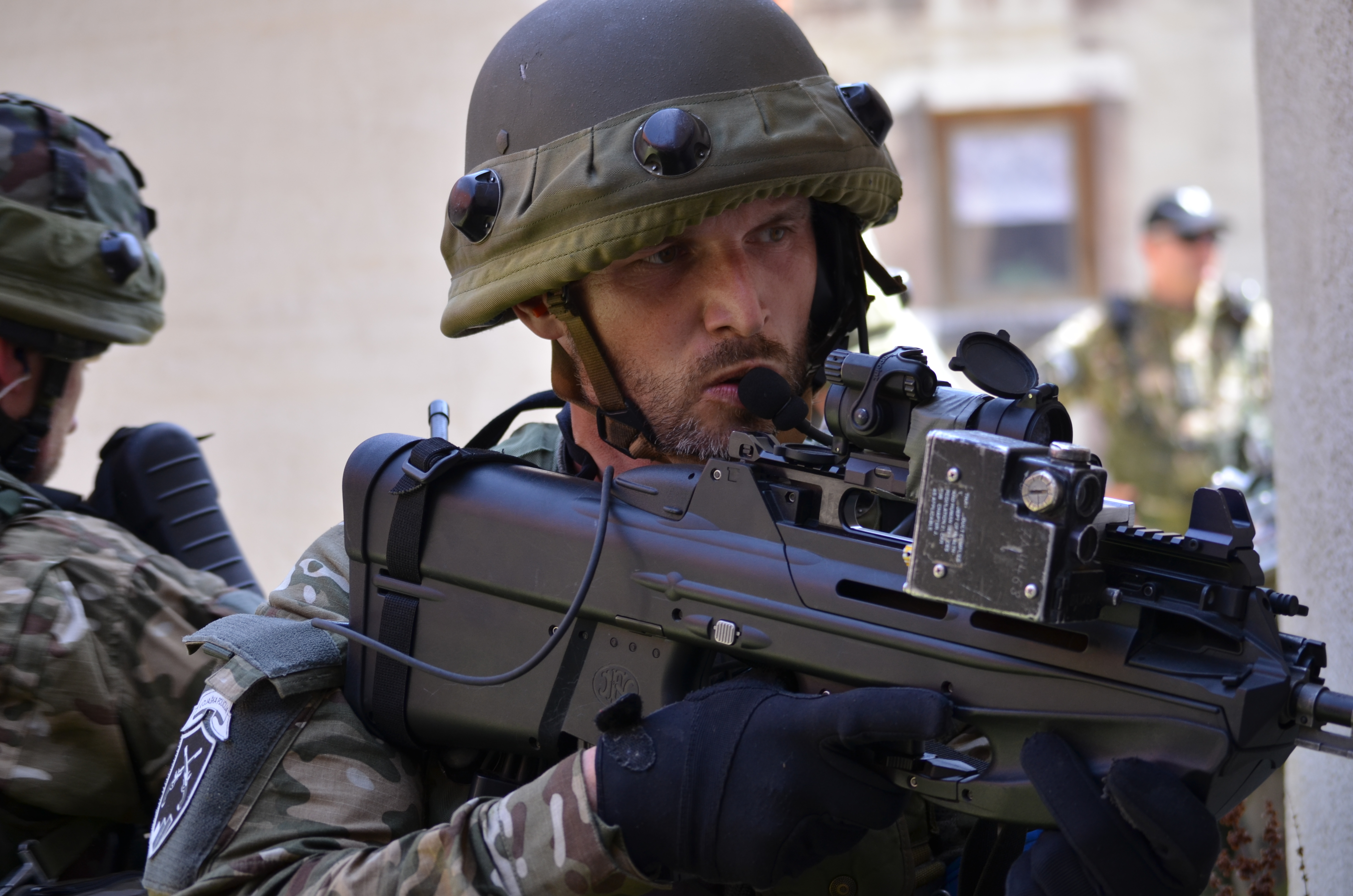
Slovenian soldiers provide security with an F2000 S while conducting a room clearance exercise during exercise Combined Resolve II at the Joint Multinational Readiness Center in Hohenfels, Germany 22 May 2014.

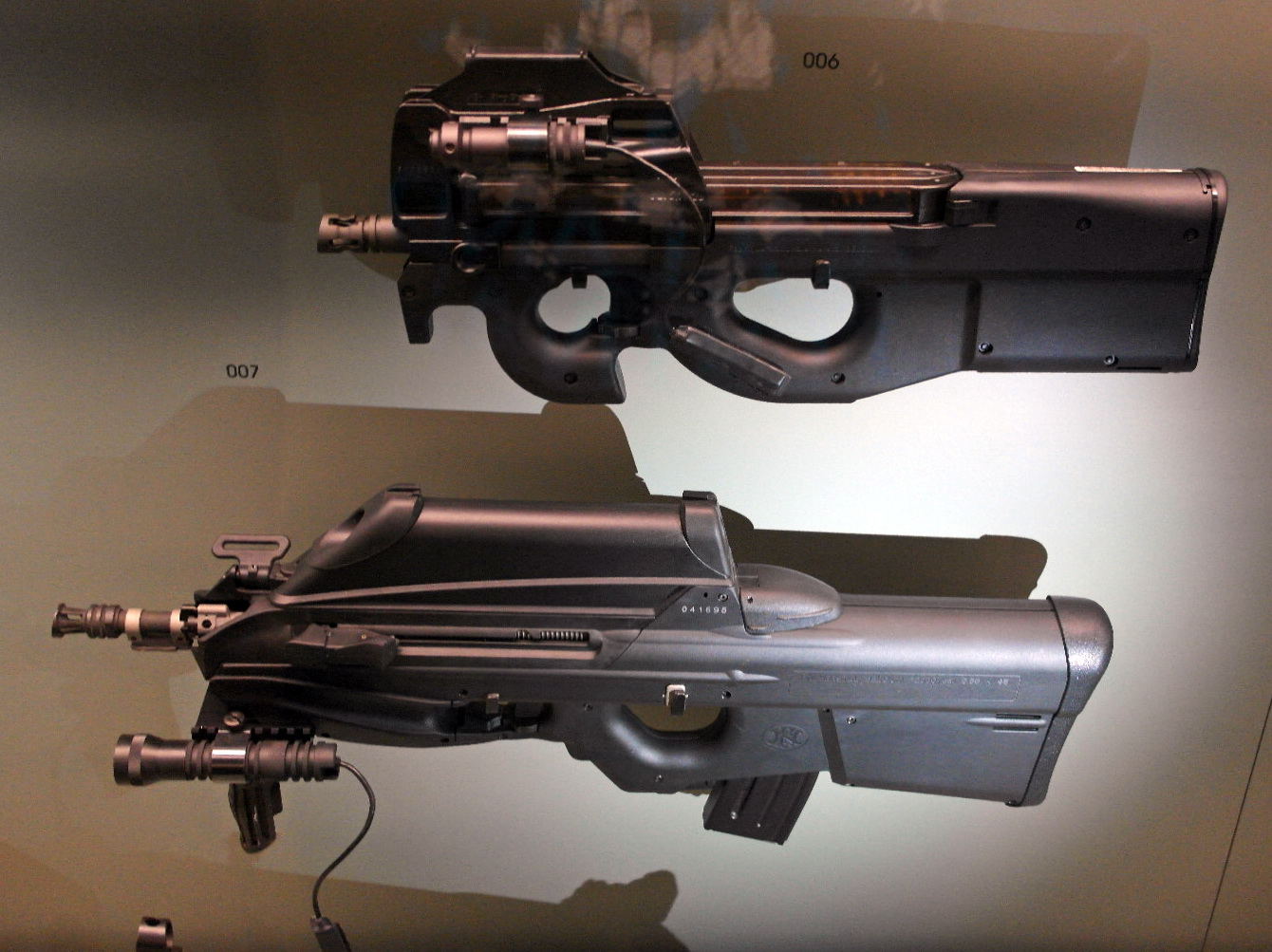
Liège, Belgium, weapons collection of the Musée des armes in the Grand Curtius. At the top the FN P90, at the bottom the FN F2000.

== See also ==
- List of bullpup firearms
