= Slovenian Territorial Defence =

Former military forces of Slovenia (1990–94)

Territorial Defense of the Republic of Slovenia
- Teritorialna obramba Republike Slovenije
- Founded: 1990
- Disbanded: 1994
- Headquarters: Ljubljana

Leadership
- Commander-in-Chief: President Milan Kučan (1990–1994)
- Minister of Defence: Janez Janša (1990–1994)
- Chief of staff: Janez Slapar (1991–1993); Albin Gutman (1993–1994)

Personnel
- Military age: 15
- Conscription: Yes
- Active personnel: 55,000

Related articles
- History: Slovenian War of Independence

The Territorial Defense of the Republic of Slovenia (Slovene: Teritorialna obramba Republike Slovenije (TO RS)), also known as the Territorial Defense of Slovenia (Slovenian: Teritorialna obramba Slovenije [TOS]), was the predecessor of the Slovenian Armed Forces. It was named after the Yugoslav Territorial Defense.

== History ==
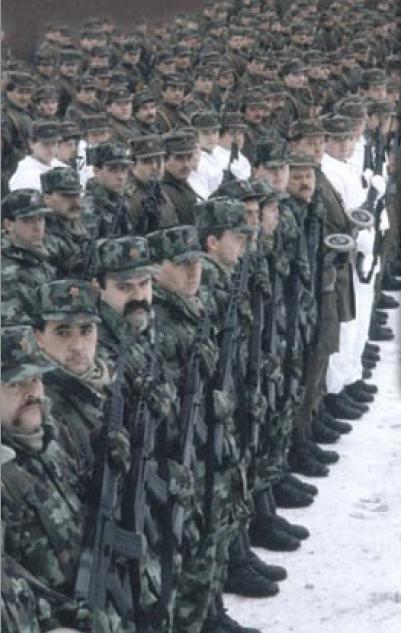
Slovenian Territorial Defence on December 17 1990 in Kočevska Reka

After the 1968 Warsaw Pact invasion of Czechoslovakia, the Yugoslav leadership adopted the doctrine of General People's Defence and established the Territorial Defense. After the victory of democratic parties in the 1990 Slovenian parliamentary election, the central government in Belgrade ordered disarmament of TO Slovenia, a decision that was effectively ignored. Many weapons subsequently disappeared from supply depots and were later issued to the initial territorial defence units of the Republic of Slovenia.

== Command ==
TO headquarters were established on November 20, 1968. The early development of this military command was almost exclusively in the hands of Slovenian officers. In 1990, the Territorial Defence Republic Headquarters was violently occupied by the federal army. After this incident, Slovenia designated a new headquarters, who took command of the Slovenian Army. May 1991 marked the opening of the first military training centres in Ig, Ljubljana; and Pekre, Maribor. The first draftees were sworn in on June 2.

== Organization ==
The command language in TO was Slovenian, and this itself was organized in the form of an ancillary impact force to the JNA. After 1990 it was organized as a separate army, which was finally formed in the months before independence, in accordance with the Slovenian Constitution, which had been adopted in 1991.

== Equipment ==
=== Small arms ===
- Zastava M 70AB assault rifle
- Tokarev TT-33 handgun
- MG 34 machine gun
- Fagot anti-tank guided missile
- SKS carbine Yugoslav version M59/66
- Malyutka anti-tank guided missile
- Strela 2 MANPAD
- M80 Zolja anti-tank rocket launcher
- MG42 general-purpose machine gun Yugoslav version M53
- M48 bolt-action rifle including sniper version
- MGV-176 submachine gun
- M56 submachine gun Yugoslav version of MP40
- M60 recoilless gun
- M72 light machine gun
- M76 sniper rifle
- M79 Osa anti-tank rocket launcher
- M84 machine gun
- M49 submachine gun Yugoslav PPSh-41
- RB M57
- SAR 80 assault rifle
- 3M6 Shmel anti-tank missile

=== Vehicles ===
- M-84 main battle tank
- M-36 tank destroyer
- T-54/55 main battle tank
- T-34/85 medium tank
- BTR-50 armoured personnel carrier PU version
- 2S1 Gvozdika self-propelled howitzer
- BOV APC
- BRDM-2 armored car
- BVP M-80 IFV
- TAM 5000 military truck
- Puch G utility vehicle
- TAM-110 truck

=== Artillery ===
- M75 20mm AAG
- M-63 Plamen multiple rocket launcher
- BOV-3 SPAAG
- ZSU-57-2
- M53/59 Praga
- 9K31 Strela-1 SAM

=== Aircraft ===
Aircraft	Photo	Origin	Type	Versions	In service	Notes
UTVA-75		Yugoslavia	trainer		14	Left by the JNA
SOKO SA 341 Gazelle		Yugoslavia	transport		1	Defected from the JNA
Bell 206 JetRanger		United States	utility helicopter		3	
Bell 412		United States	utility helicopter		1	
Let L-410 Turbolet		Czech Republic	transport		1	Added in 1994
Agusta AW109		Italy	fast VIP transport	A109A Mk II	1	

== See also ==
- Military of Slovenia
- Slovenian War of Independence
