= Slovenian Ground Force =

Component of Slovenian Armed Forces

Slovenian Ground Forces
- Slovenska vojska
- Emblem of the Slovenian army
- Active: 1991–1993 (as the Slovene Territorial Defense Forces), 1993–present
- Country: Slovenia
- Type: Ground army
- Role: Defending Slovene territory
- Part of: Slovenian Armed Forces
- Garrison/HQ: Vojkova cesta 55, 1000 Ljubljana
- Equipment: 56 MBTs, 380 IFVs and APCs, 240+ Artillery pieces
- Engagements: Slovenian War of Independence; War in Afghanistan; Iraq War; EUFOR Tchad/RCA; Kosovo Force (KFOR)

Commanders
- Commander in Chief: Nataša Pirc Musar
- Minister of Defense: Borut Sajovič
- Chief of the General Staff: Boštjan Močnik

The Slovenian Ground Force is the primary component of Slovenian Armed Forces.

== History ==
The current Slovenian Armed Forces are descended from the Territorial Defense of the Republic of Slovenia (Teritorialna Obramba Republike Slovenije; TORS), which was formed in 1968 as a paramilitary complement to the regular army of the former Yugoslav within the territory of Slovenia. The main objectives of TORS were to support the Yugoslav People's Army (JNA) and conduct guerrilla operations in the event of an invasion.

When Slovenia declared independence at the onset of the Yugoslav Wars in 1991, the TORS and the Slovenian police comprised the majority of forces engaging the JNA during the Ten-Day War. The Slovenian Armed Forces were formally established in 1993 as a reorganization of the TORS.

== Current equipment ==
=== Personnel equipment ===
Equipment	Image	Country	Type	Number	Notes
Uniforms
Uniforms		Slovenia	Uniform	Unknown	From left to right. Slocam standard uniform. Fireproof uniform used by special forces and vehicle crews made from graphene. Slocam winter camo. All are produced by Slovenian company UF PRO.
M91 Oakleaf		Yugoslavia; Slovenia	Uniform	Unknown	The pattern is based on the Yugoslav M87 pattern. Used by reserve forces.
M91 Desert		Yugoslavia; Slovenia	Uniform	Unknown	Modified M91 Camouflage for desert.
Helmets
Šestan-Busch BK-ACH-MC		Croatia; Slovenia	Helmet	5200+	At least 5200+ bought. To be in use by 2025.
ACH MICH H10		United States	Helmet	Unknown	To be fully replaced by 2025. In use by reserve forces.
Future Assault Shell Technology helmet		United States	Helmet	Unknown	Used by special forces and JTAC units.

=== Small arms ===
Model	Image	Origin	Type	Caliber or cartridge	Details
Handguns
Beretta 92FS		Italy	Semi-automatic pistol	9×19mm Parabellum	Standard handgun of the Slovenian Army.
Pistol Rex Zero-1 S FDE		Slovenia	Semi-automatic pistol	9×19mm Parabellum	Used by Slovenian Special Forces. Future standard handgun, 10000 on order.
SIG Sauer P226		Switzerland	Semi-automatic pistol	9×19mm Parabellum	Used by officers and special forces.
Submachine guns
Heckler & Koch MP5		Germany	Submachine gun	9×19mm Parabellum	Used by Slovenian Military Police and special units.
Shotguns
Benelli M4		Italy	Shotgun	12 gauge	Semi-automatic shotgun.
Carbines
M59 PAP		Yugoslavia	Carbine	7.62×39mm	Used by Slovenian Ceremonial Honor Guard.
Assault rifles and battle rifles
FN F2000S		Belgium	Assault rifle	5.56×45mm NATO	In June 2006, a contract was signed for 6,500 F2000 rifles as the new standard service rifle along with the 40 mm GL1 grenade launcher. The Slovenian Army ultimately purchased 14,000 rifles. In 2023-25, it was decided to adopt a new standard assault rifle, the FN SCAR. The F2000S is expected to go into reserve use.
Zastava M70		Yugoslavia	Assault rifle	7.62×39mm	Used by reserve soldiers.
FN SCAR		Belgium	Battle rifle Assault rifle	5.56×45mm NATO 7.62×51mm NATO	Future standard service rifle. SCAR H and L variants are used by Slovenian Special Forces (ESD). Already used by the 10th Reconnaissance Battalion. The first new rifles arrived in 2025.
Machine guns
FN Minimi Para		Belgium	Light machine gun	5.56×45mm NATO	Standard issue light machine gun.
FN MAG		Belgium	General-purpose machine gun	7.62×51mm NATO	Standard issue medium machine gun.
M2HB		Belgium	Heavy machine gun	12.7×99mm NATO	M2HB QCB variant manufactured by FN Herstal.
Sniper rifles
Steyr SSG 69		Austria	Bolt action sniper rifle	7.62×51mm NATO	Bolt-action sniper rifle.
Sako TRG		Finland	Bolt action sniper rifle	7.62×51mm NATO	Bolt-action sniper rifle.
PGM Ultima Ratio		France	Bolt action sniper rifle	7.62×51mm NATO	Sniper rifle.
PGM Mini Hecate		France	Bolt action sniper rifle	.338 Lapua Magnum	Medium sniper rifle.
PGM Hécate II		France	Bolt action sniper rifle	12.7×99mm NATO	Heavy sniper rifle.
Grenade launchers
Heckler & Koch GMG		Germany	Automatic grenade launcher	40x53mm HV	
Milkor MGL		South Africa	Revolver grenade launcher	40×46mm LV	
GL1		Belgium	Grenade launcher	40×46 mm LV	
Explosives
ARGES SPLHGR 85		Austria	Fragmentation grenade		Filled with steel fragments, used in an open battlefields and for clearing enclosed spaces like trenches and bunkers.
ARGES OFFHGR 85|		Austria	Fragmentation grenade		Filled with plastic fragments, used to disable and shock the enemy.
Anti-tank weapons
Spike LR2		Israel	Anti-tank guided missile	130 mm	Ordered in September 2022 from Eurospike for €6.67 million (range 5.5 km). These will equip the L-ATV on the remote controlled weapon station Protector RS4.
Spike LR		Israel	Anti-tank guided missile	170 mm	
RGW 90		Germany	Disposable recoilless gun	90 mm	
Carl Gustav M4		Sweden	Reusable recoillesss rifle	84 mm	Recoilless anti tank weapon which will replace the RGW 90. Bought with different types of ammunition from high explosive anti tank to dual purpose.
MANPADSs
Igla-S		Russia	Man-portable air-defense system	72 mm	
Strelets		Russia	Short range air defense	72 mm	Mounted on Puch G vehicles with 9S846 mount.

=== Artillery and Air-Defence ===
Model	Image	Origin	Type	Caliber	Number	Notes
Soltam M71 (M839) TN90		Israel	Towed howitzer	155 mm L/39	18	
Soltam K6 MN 9		Israel	Heavy mortar	120 mm	50	
2S1 Gvozdika		Soviet Union	Self-propelled howitzer	122 mm	9	8x in reserve, 1 in Pivka military museum
CAESAR		France	Self-propelled howitzer	155 mm	(12 on order)	Plans for another 6 later on.
M69		Yugoslavia	Mortar	82 mm	Unknown	Used by reserve forces
M57		Yugoslavia	Mortar	60 mm	Unknown	Used by reserve forces
Roland II		Germany	SAM system	89 mm	4	2 units reportedly still in use with Cerklje ob Krki Airport air defense, rest stored with missiles demolished (sent for destruction in Croatia in November 2016). 1 in Pivka military museum. 1 in Maribor barracks.
IRIS-T SLM		Germany	SAM system	127 mm	(3 units on order)	One unit consists of a radar, a tactical operations center, and four missile launchers. Contract for 1 fire unit signed in December 2023. In early 2025, it was decided to order two more units. The first fire unit is expected to be delivered in 2027, and the second and third in 2028.

=== Combat vehicles ===
Model	Image	Origin	Type	Number	Notes
Tanks
M-84A4 Sniper		Yugoslavia; Croatia; Slovenia	Main battle tank	54	13-20 in active use. 34–41 in reserve status. All were upgraded to M-84A4 Sniper standard by 2008.
Armoured personnel carriers
SKOV Svarun; Variant of Patria AMV		Finland; Slovenia	Armoured personnel carrier	30 (+106 Patria AMV^{XP} on order)	30 vehicles delivered according to a Settlement Agreement with Patria. 20 equipped with Protector RCWS. After a competition between 4 offers for vehicles (and after deciding not to buy the Boxer), on 11 July 2024 the Patria offer was chosen. The vehicles will be used to create a medium battalion battle group and later a scout battalion.
Patria Mangart 30 RCT		Finland; Slovenia	Infantry fighting vehicle		Unveiled at Slovenian military day 24.5.2025. Exact number to be purchased is unknown. Equipped with a 30mm Mangart RCT turret and 4 loitering munition drones
Patria Mangart 25 RCT		Finland; Slovenia	Multi-Role Armored Combat Vehicle	12	12 Patria AMV modified into Patria Mangart 25 RCT (Remote Controlled Turret) by installing a 25mm autocannon turret developed in Slovenia.
Valuk; Variant of Pandur I		Austria; Slovenia	Multi-role armoured fighting vehicle	65	65 vehicles in service. 19 of them in the 20th Infantry Regiment. Variants: Armoured personnel carrier; Ambulance; Mortar carrier (CARDOM 120mm); Scout / reconnaissance armed with a Rafael OWS-25 turret (M242 Bushmaster + BGM-71 TOW); 20 were donated to Ukraine in 2023.

=== Other vehicles ===
Model	Image	Origin	Type	Number	Notes
Reconnaissance vehicles
Otokar Cobra		Turkey	Reconnaissance vehicle	10	Nuclear, biological, chemical reconnaissance vehicle.
Light multi-role vehicle
Oshkosh L-ATV		United States	Light multi-role vehicle	75 (+86 on order for a total of 161)	Variant: M1278 Heavy Guns Carrier: Batch 1: 24 Ordered in 2018, delivered in May 2021.; Batch 2: 14 Complementary order in February 2020 for 14 additional although not disclosed.; Batch 3: 37 Ordered in September 2021. By 2023, 75 delivered.; Batch 4: 39 Donated by the US in a Ringtausch agreement for the Slovenian equipment donated to Ukraine.; Batch 5: 47 Ordered in December 2022; 86 vehicles remaining on order. Deliveries to take place in 2024 and 2025. Will be armed with RCWS Protector RS4 (Kongsberg M153 CROWS) which is equipped with a M2 machine gun and capable to shoot the Spike LR and Spike LR2 which are in service in the Slovenian Army. Some modified into Oshkosh MANGART 25 by installing a Slovenian-made 25mm cannon turret.
Oshkosh MANGART 25		United States; Slovenia	Light multi-role vehicle	Unknown	Upgraded Oshkosh L-ATV with a Mangart 25mm autocannon turret installed. Turret developed by Slovenian company Valhalla. They will be used for defense against low-flying drones.
Humvee		United States; Slovenia	Light multi-role vehicle	30	M1114 and M1152 variants. 8 Humvees M1152 have been upgraded with a Spike LR system developed by Slovenia. Will be gradually replaced by Oshkosh L-ATV. 20 units sent to Ukraine.
Mine-resistant ambush protected vehicles
Cougar JERRV		United States	Mine-resistant ambush protected vehicle	7	Used by EOD units.
Military light utility vehicles
Steyr Daimler Puch G 230 GE		Austria	Military light utility vehicle		
Iveco		Italy	Military light utility vehicle	16	
Achleitner MMV Survivor		Japan	Military light utility vehicle	caa 400	A modified Toyota Land Cruiser for military missions.
MRZR		United States	Military light utility vehicle	Unknown	
STRiX eMotors		Slovenia	Motorcycle	6	Electric hard enduro motorcycle used by special forces. Up to 200 to be produced in 2024.
Military trucks
RMMV HX2 8×8		Germany	Transport and water trucks	40 (+28 on order)	In exchange for sending 28 Slovenian M55S tanks (upgraded T-55 tanks) to Ukraine, Germany handed over 40 MAN HX 8×8 RMMV trucks to Slovenia in December 2022. 28 ordered in 2025. 5 modules with 10,000-liter tanks for drinking water.
MAN 15 TMILGL W A1		Austria; Germany	Military truck		The vehicle is intended for transport of material and technical assets (MTS), mainly ammunition and mines.
Mercedes-Benz Actros		Germany	Military truck		The vehicle is intended for transport of material and technical means (MTS) and personnel.
Iveco T-series		Italy	Military truck		The vehicle is intended for transport of material and technical means (MTS) and personnel.
Unimog		West Germany; Germany	Military truck	30	The vehicle is intended for transport of material and technical means (MTS) and special vehicle with superstructure. The vehicle is equipped with a roof lining, which allows infantry weapons to be installed.
IvecoEvrocargo ML 140 E 24 WR 4x4		Italy	Military truck	80	The vehicle is intended for the transport of material and technical resources (MTS) and people (three people in the driver's cabin and 14 on the platform).
TAM 150 T11 B/BV		Yugoslavia	Military truck		The vehicle is intended for transport of material and technical means (MTS), also used as water/fuel tank vehicle, as decontamination vehicle and special vehicle with superstructure.
TAM 110 T7 B/BV		Yugoslavia	Military truck		Mainly used for towing mortars.
Armoured recovery vehicles
JVBT-55		Czechoslovakia	Armoured recovery vehicle	7	
VT-55		Czechoslovakia	Armoured recovery vehicle	2	
Armoured vehicle-launched bridges
MT-55		Czechoslovakia	Armoured vehicle-launched bridge	4	

=== Radars ===
Equipment	Image	Country	Type	Number	Notes
Giraffe 1X		Sweden	Fire-control radar	Unknown	
ISKRA MTOC		Slovenia	Tactical operations center	Unknown	
CUOR		Slovenia	Fire Management Center	Unknown	
EL/M-2106		Israel	Man-portable radar	Unknown	
Ground Master 400		France	Radar	2	

== Potential future equipment ==
Equipment	Image	Country	Type	Number	Notes
Logistic vehicles	(illustration image)	European Union	Logistic vehicle	Unknown	The Government included in the defence development plan for the period from 2023 to 2026 the purchase of new trucks and light utility vehicles, to replace the old and worn-out ones. The project is estimated at €24 million.
Mistral		France	Short Range surface to air missile	Unknown	

== Stored equipment ==
- 10× 9M111 Fagot anti-tank guided missile
- 8× 2S1 Gvozdika 122 mm self-propelled howitzer
- 9× Roland II surface-to-air missile (2 units reportedly still in use with Cerklje ob Krki Airport air defense, rest stored with missiles demolished)
- 5× BRDM-2 (reportedly used by command company of 44th Armored-mechanized Battalion "Wolves")
- Large quantities of M69 mortar and M57 Mortar, some used by reserve forces.

== Retired equipment ==
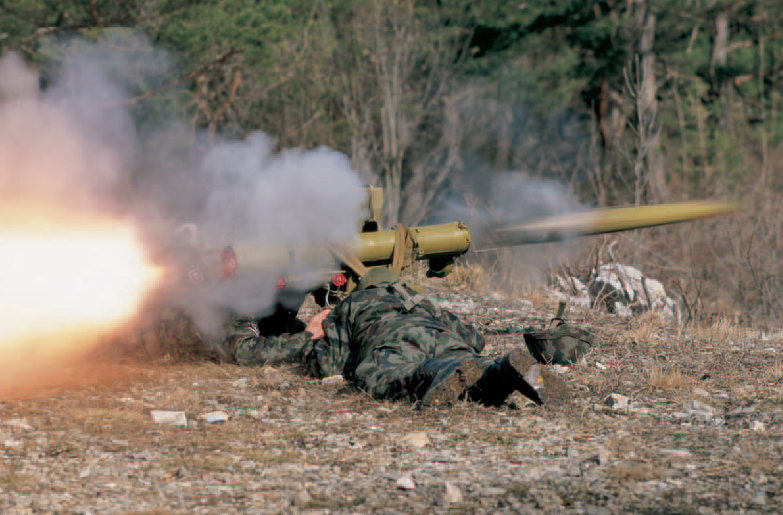
Slovenian 9M111 Fagot anti-tank guided missile

- 9K11 Malyutka anti-tank guided missile
- 6× Strela 1M
- 12× BOV 3 Slovenia donated 26 BOV, of which 20 BOV-M and 6 BOV-3, to Ukraine.
- 12× ZSU-57-2
- 30× M48B1 76 mm towed gun
- 4× M-63 Plamen Multiple rocket launcher system
- 24× M53/59 Praga
- 8× PT 76B
- 52x BVP M-80A - Slovenia donated 35 BVP M-80As to Ukraine in June 2022, some in Pivka museum
- 30x M-55S - Slovenia donated 28 M55S to Ukraine, 1 in Pivka museum, 1 in Maribor museum
- 18× M2A1 105 mm towed howitzer 16 donated to Ukraine.
