= Slovenian Armed Forces =

Combined military forces of Slovenia

- Slovenska vojska
- Emblem of the Slovenian Army

- Flag of the Slovenian Armed Forces Anthem of the Slovenian Army: Naprej, zastava slave; (English: Forward, Flag of Glory)
- Founded: 1991–1994: Territorial Defense of Slovenia
- Current form: 1994; 32 years ago
- Service branches: Slovenian Ground Force; Slovenian Air Force and Air Defence; Slovenian Navy
- Headquarters: Ljubljana
- Website: www.slovenskavojska.si/en/

Leadership
- Commander-in-Chief: President Nataša Pirc Musar
- Minister of Defence: Valentin Hajdinjak
- Chief of the General Staff: Major general Boštjan Močnik

Personnel
- Active personnel: ~7,000 (2020)
- Reserve personnel: ~26,000

Expenditure
- Budget: €1,438 billion
- Percent of GDP: 2,05%

Related articles
- History: Slovenian War of Independence; Slovenian Territorial Defence
- Ranks: Slovenian military ranks

The Slovenian Armed Forces or Slovenian Army (SAF; Slovene: Slovenska vojska; [SV]) are the armed forces of Slovenia. Since 2003, it is organized as a fully professional standing army. The Commander-in-Chief of the SAF is the President of the Republic of Slovenia, while operational command is in the domain of the Chief of the General Staff of the Slovenian Armed Forces.

== History ==
=== 20th century ===
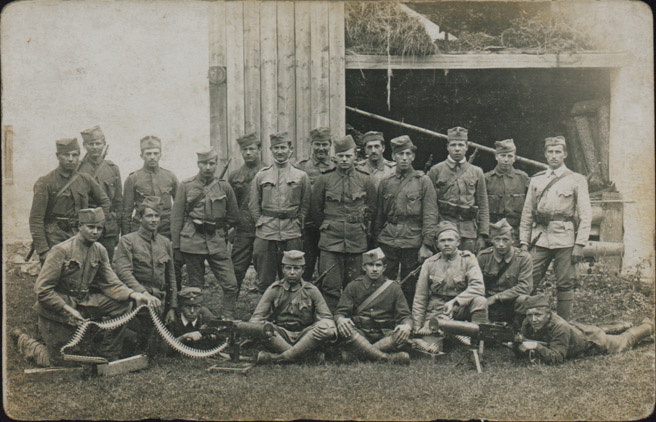
Slovene soldiers during the Austro-Slovene conflict in Carinthia, 1919

Following the disintegration of the Austrian-Hungarian Empire at the end of World War I, the Duchy of Styria was divided between the newly established states of German Austria and the State of Slovenes, Croats and Serbs. Rudolf Maister, a Slovene major of the former Austro-Hungarian Army, liberated the town of Maribor in November 1918 and claimed it for the State of Slovenes, Croats and Serbs. After a short fight with German Austrian provisional units, the current border was established, which mostly followed the ethnic-linguistic division between Slovenes and ethnic Germans in Styria.

The current Slovenian Armed Forces are descended from the Slovenian Territorial Defence (Teritorialna Obramba Republike Slovenije; or Slovene TO), formed in 1990 by fusion of Territorial Defence (formed in 1968 as a paramilitary complement to the regular army of the former Yugoslav within the territory of Slovenia) with secret alternative command structure, known as the Manoeuvre Structures of National Protection (Manevrska struktura narodne zaščite, or MSNZ), which was an existing but antiquated institution, (unique to Slovenia), intended to enable the republic to form an ad hoc defence structure, akin to a National Guard. It was of negligible importance prior to 1990, with antiquated weapons and few members.

When Slovenia declared independence at the onset of the Yugoslav Wars in 1991, the Slovenian Territorial Defence and the Slovenian police comprised the majority of forces engaging the Yugoslav People's Army during the Ten-Day War. The Slovenian Armed Forces were formally established in 1994 as a reorganization of the Slovenia Territorial Defence Force.

=== Republic of Slovenia ===
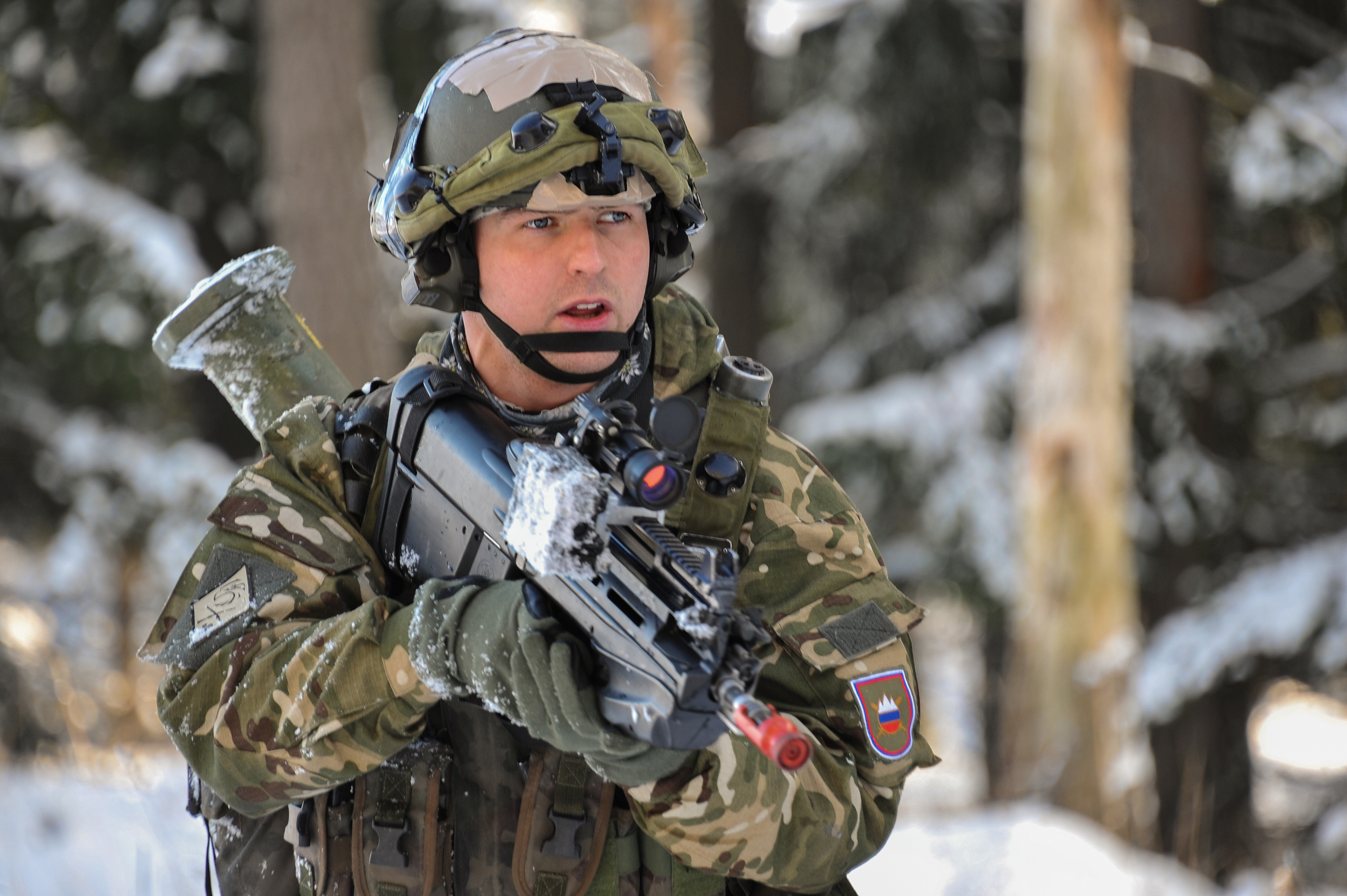
A Slovenian soldier with a FN F2000 assault rifle

After 1993, the Slovenian Armed Forces had relied on mandatory military service, with conscripts receiving 6–7 months of training. In 2003, the Slovenian Government abolished conscription and as of July 2004, the Slovenian Armed Forces had been almost completely reorganised into a professional army now based on volunteers. Currently there are approximately 7,300 active troops and approximately 1,500 in reserve, reduced from 55,000 personnel during conscription.

As of 2026, a major reorganization of the Slovenian Armed Forces is currently underway with a goal of making them more effective. In 2025, Slovenian defense spending reached the target of 2% of GDP and is set to increase to a further 5% by 2035. More than half of all commands have been disbanded which has made commanding the subordinated units easier and faster. Soldiers are to be located nearer to their homes in order to minimize travel costs. Since the Slovenian Armed Forces do not have enough modern armored vehicles to maintain three motorized battalions fulfilled at every time, one Wheeled Combat Vehicles Company and one Tank Company have been organized within the Logistics brigade, which now lends vehicles to any of four newly formed infantry regiments, regarding to the regiments' needs. Reorganization also transformed 72nd Brigade from a support unit to a combat unit and thus equaled it with the 1st Brigade. Both brigades were added support elements, such as Air Defense, Artillery, Intelligence, etc. The operational units now consist of a Special Operations Unit, Naval Division, an Aviation Regiment and three brigades, the 1st (responsible for western Slovenia), 72nd (responsible for eastern Slovenia) and Logistics Brigade.

=== NATO membership (from 2004) ===
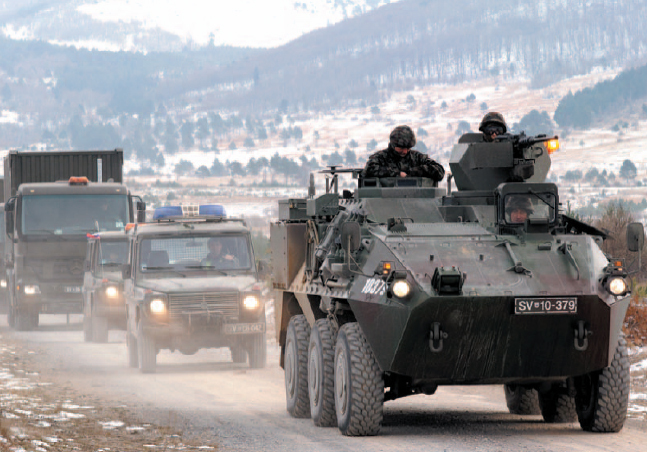
Slovene KFOR unit

As part of the former Socialist Federal Republic of Yugoslavia, Slovenia was never a member of the Warsaw Pact. Today, the foreign policy priority of NATO membership drives Slovenia's defense reorganization. Once many countries suspended the arms embargo on Slovenia in 1996, the country embarked on a military procurement program to bolster its status as a NATO candidate and to aid its transformation into a mobile force. Active in the SFOR deployment in Bosnia and Herzegovina, Slovenia is also a charter member of Partnership for Peace and a regular participant in PfP exercises. The United States provides bilateral military assistance to Slovenia, including through the International Military Education and Training (IMET) program, the State Partnership Program (aligned with Colorado), and the EUCOM Joint Contact Team Program.

Slovenia formally joined NATO in March 2004. The transition of its armed forces from a primarily conscript-based territorial defense organization to a professional force structure has the ultimate goal of creating NATO-interoperable combat units able to operate on an even par with units from other NATO armies. Implementation of interoperability objectives as determined by the Planning and Review Process (PARP) and the Individual Partnership Program (IPP) as part of Slovenia's PfP participation proceeds. Slovenia's elite units already train with and are integrated into international units including NATO members—for example as part of SFOR and on Cyprus. Its elite mountain troops will be assigned to the Multinational Land Force peacekeeping battalion with Italy, Hungary, and Croatia. Slovenia hosted its first PfP exercise in 1998--"Cooperative Adventure Exchange"—a multinational disaster-preparedness command post exercise involving almost 6,000 troops from 19 NATO and PfP member nations.

As of 2011 Slovenian soldiers were a part of international forces serving in Bosnia and Herzegovina, Kosovo, Afghanistan, Iraq, Chad, and Lebanon.

Slovenia hosts NATO Centre of Excellence for Mountain Warfare (NATO MW COE; Slovene: Natov center odličnosti za gorsko bojevanje), one of NATO Centres of Excellence, located in Begunje na Gorenjskem, Slovenia. It offers Mountain Warfare expertise and experience to the benefit of the Alliance.

== Organization ==
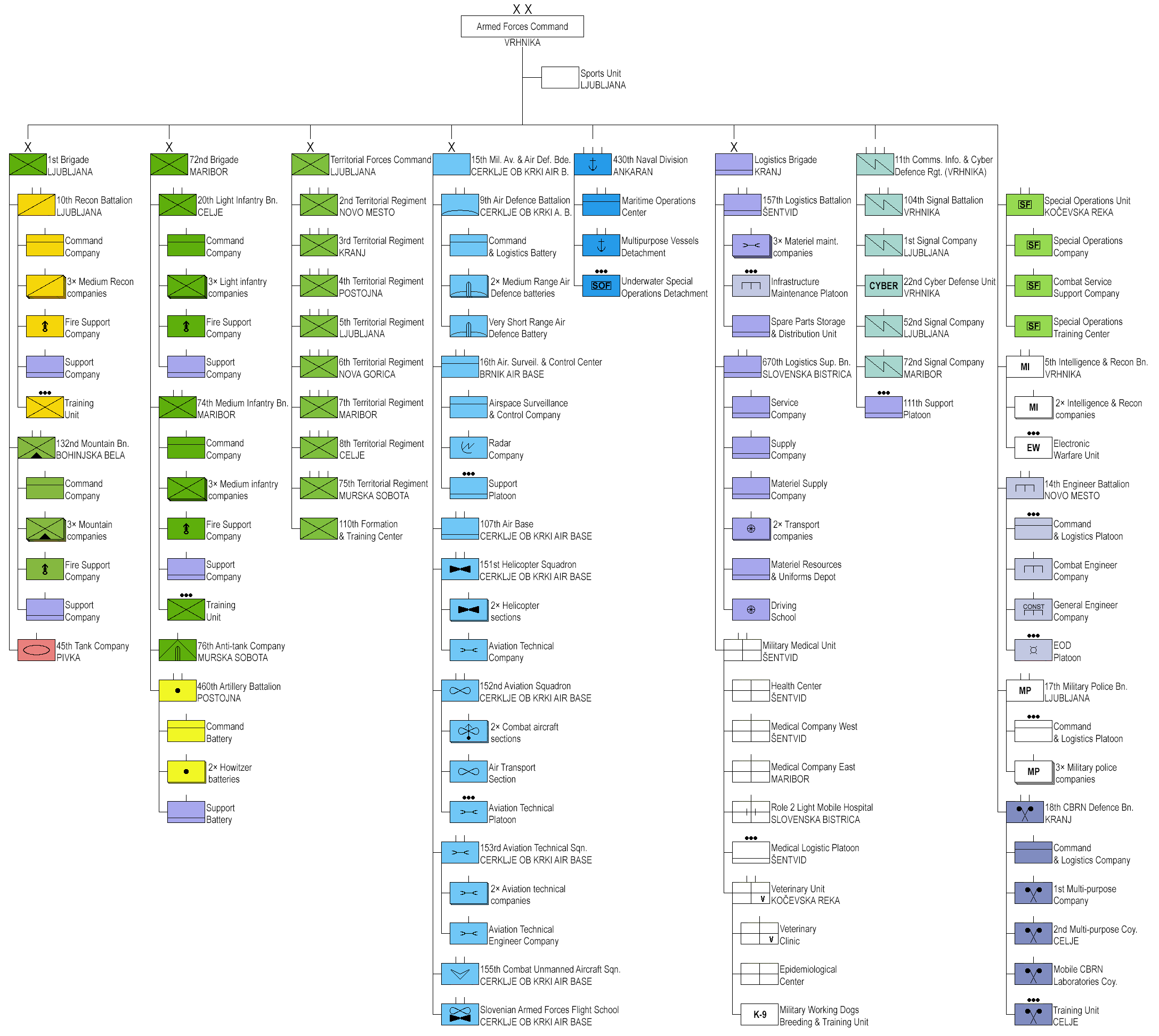
Slovenian Armed Forces Command organization 2026

The Slovenian Armed Forces are organized as single-branch armed forces with the army as their primary component. The personnel is divided into three categories:

- professional soldiers (full-time soldiers)
- contract reserve soldiers (serve up to 30 days per year)
- voluntary recruits (basic training)

=== Military airports ===
The Slovenian army currently maintains one military airport Cerklje ob Krki near town of Brežice. The airport's official name is Cerklje ob Krki Airbase.

The others that are partially military are:

- Ljubljana Airbase shares the airport with Ljubljana International Airport. One helicopter Bell 412 is stationed there for mountain rescue.

== Unit locations ==
Slovenian Armed Forces locations 2018
1st Brigade, 72nd Brigade, and infantry regiments Territorial regiments Air Base Naval Base Special Forces Logistic Brigade, and logistic units GM 403 radar station
Control and Reporting Centre

== International cooperation ==
Slovenia is part of the United Nations, NATO and the European Union, and supports the efforts of these organisations in peacekeeping operations and humanitarian activities. The Slovenian Armed Forces have been participating in various missions since 1997, when the first unit was deployed to Albania for a humanitarian operation. Slovenia has continued its efforts in international cooperation by participating in various missions in Afghanistan, Iraq, Cyprus, Pakistan and other countries. The total number of sent personnel through Slovenia's contribution to missions is more than 15,000, but some speculations estimate over 20,000 personnel.

=== Current operations ===
Data as of April 2023.

Deployment	Organization	Operation	Personnel
Bosnia and Herzegovina	NATO	Joint Enterprise	4
Kosovo	NATO	KFOR	99
Serbia	NATO	Joint Enterprise	1
Bosnia and Herzegovina	EU	EUFOR Althea	16
Mali	EU	EUTM Mali	4
Lebanon	UN	UNIFIL	1
Syria	UN	UNTSO	3
Italy	EU	EU Navfor Med	3
Iraq	CJTF	Operation Inherent Resolve	3
Latvia	NATO	NATO Enhanced Forward Presence	49
Slovakia	NATO	NATO Enhanced Forward Presence	96	_

== Current equipment ==
=== Ground Force ===
The Slovenian Armed Forces sent a request for 14 Pandur EVO armoured vehicles in late 2019. As the SAF already operate 85 Pandur I (Valuk), which is from the same family of vehicles and is the main vehicle of the army and were bought from the same company as the new ones which was Steyr (Austrian) in the past and today General Dynamics Land Systems (American), the company is offering the vehicles to the army as they know it will have all requirements for the SAF that the old ones lacked which is troop space, protection, modern electronics and RCWS. Unlike the Austrian Pandur EVO, which is only armed with 12.7mm M2 Browning HMG, some Slovenian Pandur EVO will be equipped with 40mm Heckler & Koch GMG. The Austrian government is offering a government to government contract with the Slovenian government to make the purchase cheaper. The director of GDELS confirmed there will be no corruption or problems with the purchase as they have done purchases in the past with no problem, as the SAF is an important customer to them. The 14 vehicles will fulfil 1 company of troops and the cost is estimated around 40 million Euros. The purchase is currently on standby as they are waiting for the decision of the new government for the purchase. Delivery to take place between 2020 and 2021.

Since the new defence minister wanted and still wants to finish the purchase of Boxer (armoured fighting vehicle) and the new general also being interested in it, if they solve the pricing problems it is possible that they will buy 56 Boxer vehicles instead of 14 Pandur EVO.

Alongside the 14 Pandur EVO armoured vehicles, they will be joined by 38 Joint Light Tactical Vehicle which the delivery date was said to be in 2021-2023 but has changed as productions etc. is going better than expected and therefor already being 12 Joint Light Tactical Vehicles in the army in 2020 which are intended to replace the Humvee. The cost for the purchase was 46,5 million Euros. They will be armed with 12.7mm M2 Browning HMG and some with 40mm Heckler & Koch GMG, 1 company being an anti-tank company equipped with Spike (ATGM) LR/MR missiles.

The ministry of defence of RS said in 2020 that the artillery will be equipped with self propelled howitzers which will increase its firepower, speed and efficiency. The German Panzerhaubitze 2000 is a high contender in this purchase which will be done after the purchase of the Pandur EVO armoured vehicles in 2022–2023.

As Slovenian ground force already has 11 Roland (missile) II short range air defences, the ministry of defence of RS said that they will make a purchase of a short to medium range air defence system with integrated radar which reduce the need for trucks to tow a radar for the air defence system. Purchase will be done in around 2024.

In May 2022, Slovenia signed a contract for the delivery of 45 Boxer (armoured fighting vehicle) in four different variants, with the contract being worth €281.5 Million and delivery of the vehicles expected to begin from 2024 until 2026.

=== Air Force ===
The Ministry of Defence stated that it will retire some aircraft to lower maintenance costs, while purchasing large transport aircraft. The purchase was completed in 2007 between the Italian Alenia C-27J Spartan and Spanish EADS CASA C-295. Both were tested in Cerklje ob Krki Airport military airport by the Slovenian pilots and the decision was made to buy the Spanish C-295, but one crashed and the purchase was cancelled.

Slovenian airspace is secured by NATO with NATO AIR POLICING. For NATO nations that do not have the necessary air capabilities (Albania, Estonia, Iceland, Luxembourg, Montenegro, Latvia, Lithuania, and Slovenia), agreements exist to ensure airspace security within SACEUR's area of responsibility. NATO Air Policing is a peacetime collective defence mission, which is at the very heart of NATO's founding treaty. It ensures the integrity of Allies' airspace and protects Alliance nations by maintaining continuous a 24/7 Air Policing within Supreme Allied Commander Europe's (SACEUR's) area of responsibility.

=== Navy ===
The Slovenian Navy or officially the 430th Naval Division is not a separate service, but an integral part of the Slovenian Armed Forces. The Division consists of the Super Dvora Mk II-class patrol boat Ankaran and the Project 10412-class patrol boat Triglav.

== Gallery ==
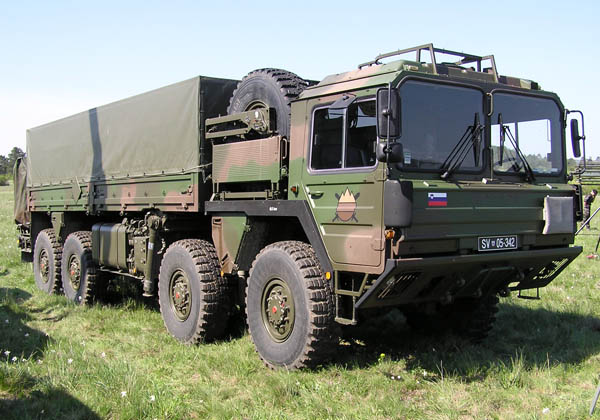
Slovenian MAN Army Truck

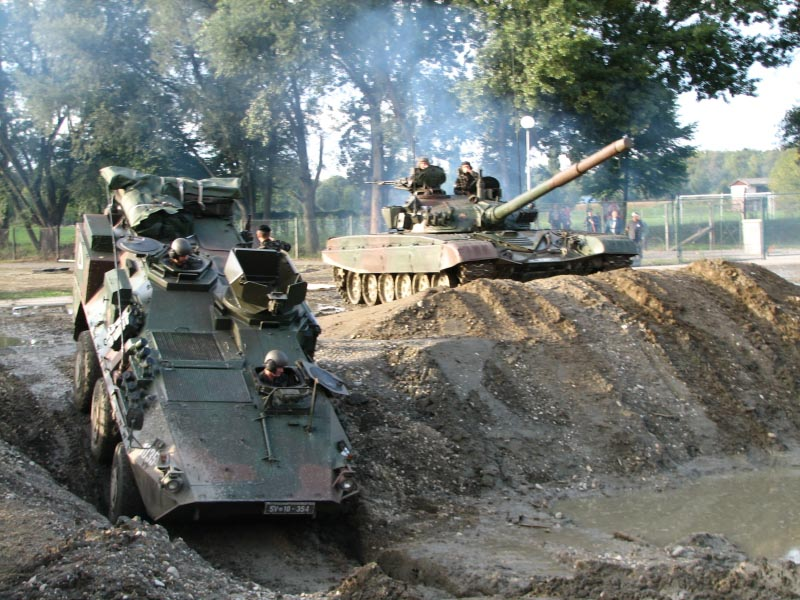
Slovenian Armoured Vehicles

Slovene Army Humvee on patrol in Kosovo

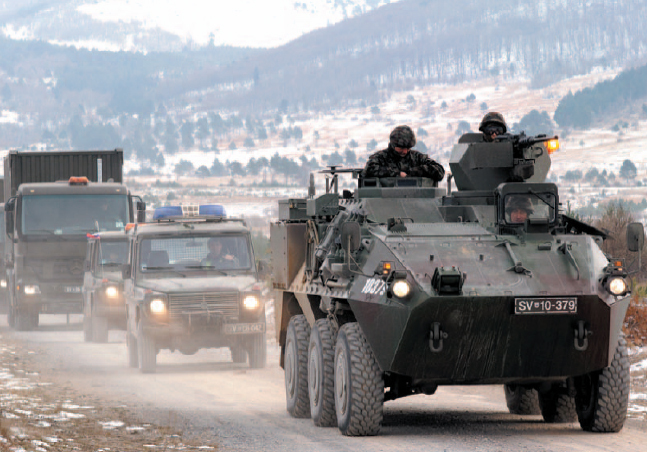
Slovenian Convoy in Kosovo KFOR Mission

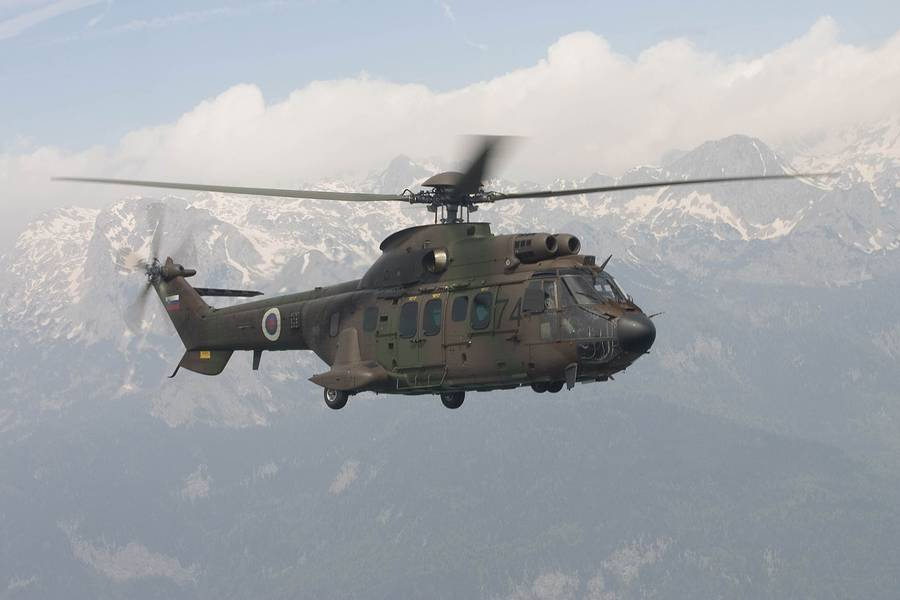
AS AL 532 Cougar of the Slovenian Air Force

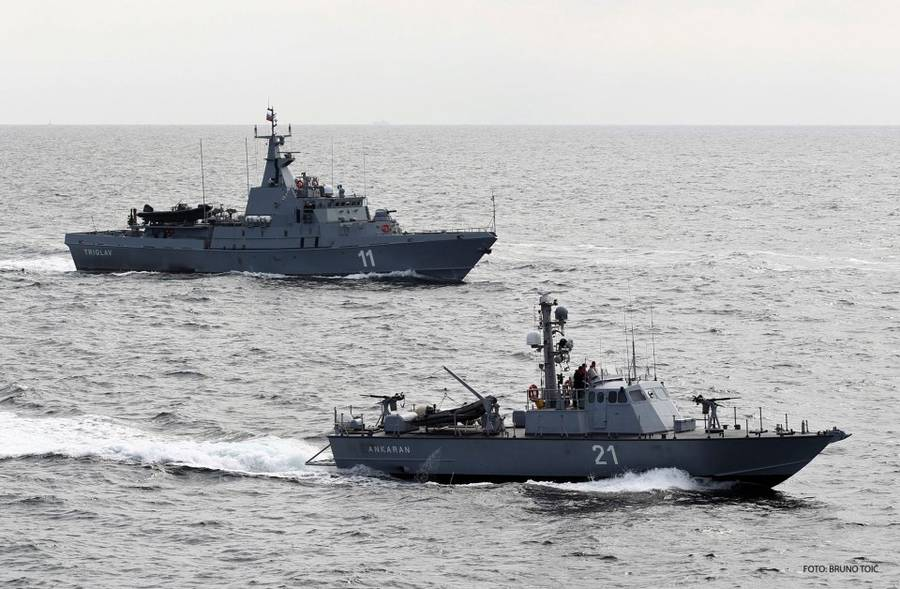
10412 class patrol boat Triglav with Super Dvora Mk II-class patrol boat Ankaran
