= Structure of the Slovenian Armed Forces =

This article represents the structure of the Slovenian Armed Forces since the military reform in 2013.

== General Staff ==
The General Staff of the Slovenian Army is a body within the Ministry of Defense and, at the same time, the highest military expert authority for commanding the Slovenian Army. It carries out tasks related to the planning and development of forces, organization, training and operation of the Slovenian Army and provides support to the Minister of Defense, the Prime Minister of the Republic of Slovenia and the President of the Republic of Slovenia.

- General Staff, in Ljubljana
  - Chief of the General Staff Office
  - Military Police Department
  - Military Aviation Authority
  - Verification Center
  - NATO Mountain Warfare Center of Excellence, in Begunje na Gorenjskem
  - Military Vicariate, in Ljubljana
  - Guard Unit, in Ljubljana
  - Slovenian Army Orchestra, in Šentvid
  - Operational Support Unit

=== Doctrine, Development, Education and Training Command ===
- Doctrine, Development, Education and Training Command, in Maribor
  - Officer Education and Training Center, in Maribor
    - Command and Staff School, in Maribor
    - Officers School, in Maribor
    - Military College, in Maribor
  - Non-commissioned Officer Education and Training Center, in Maribor
    - Non-commissioned Officers School, in Maribor
    - Higher Military Vocational School, in Maribor
  - Joint Training Center, in Postojna
    - Research and Simulation Unit
    - Military Training Ranges, Shooting Ranges and Polygons Unit
    - Combat Proficiency Testing Unit
  - Training Center , in Vipava
    - Training Company Vipava, in Vipava
    - Training Company Murska Sobota, in Murska Sobota
    - Training Company Bohinjska Bela, in Bohinjska Bela
    - Training Company Novo Mesto, in Novo Mesto
  - Doctrine and Development Center, in Šentvid
    - Doctrine and Development Group,
    - Quality of Military Education and Training Development Group
    - E-learning Group
    - Military Operations Group
    - Military Management, Leadership and Ethics Group
    - Military Defense Systems Group
    - Library, Information and Publishing Center, in Šentvid
      - Detachments in Maribor and Vipava
    - Foreign Language School, in Begunje na Gorenjskem

=== Armed Forces Command ===
- Armed Forces Command, in Vrhnika
  - Slovenian Armed Forces Sports Unit, in Ljubljana
  - 1st Brigade, in Ljubljana
    - 45th Tank Company, in Pivka, with M-84A4 Sniper main battle tanks
    - 10th Reconnaissance Battalion, in Ljubljana
      - Command Company
      - 3× Medium reconnaissance companies, with Joint Light Tactical Vehicles
      - Fire Support Company
      - Support Company
      - Training Unit
    - 132nd Mountain Battalion, in Bohinjska Bela
      - Command Company
      - 3× Mountain companies
      - Fire Support Company
      - Support Company
  - 72nd Brigade, in Maribor
    - 76th Anti-tank Company, in Murska Sobota, with Spike anti-tank guided missiles
    - 20th Light Infantry Battalion, in Celje
      - Command Company
      - 3× Light infantry companies, with Valuk light armored vehicles
      - Fire Support Company
      - Support Company
    - 74th Medium Infantry Battalion, in Maribor
      - Command Company
      - 3× Medium infantry companies, with SKOV Svarun armored personnel carriers (being replaced by Patria AMV^{XP} armored personnel carriers)
      - Fire Support Company
      - Support Company
      - Training Unit
    - 460th Artillery Battalion, in Postojna (activated on 12 December 2025)
      - Command Battery
      - 2× Howitzer batteries, with Soltam M-71 towed howitzers (being replaced by CAESAR self-propelled howitzers)
      - Support Battery (being formed)
  - Territorial Forces Command, in Ljubljana
    - 2nd Territorial Regiment, in Novo Mesto
    - 3rd Territorial Regiment, in Kranj
    - 4th Territorial Regiment, in Postojna
    - 5th Territorial Regiment, in Ljubljana
    - 6th Territorial Regiment, in Nova Gorica
    - 7th Territorial Regiment, in Maribor
    - 8th Territorial Regiment, in Celje
    - 75th Territorial Regiment, in Murska Sobota
    - 110th Formation and Training Center
  - 15th Military Aviation and Air Defence Brigade, at Cerklje ob Krki Air Base
    - 9th Air Defence Battalion, at Cerklje ob Krki Air Base
      - Command and Logistics Battery
      - 1st Medium Range Air Defence Battery, with Igla-S man portable air defence systems and Giraffe 1X radar (to be equipped with IRIS-T SLM)
      - 2nd Medium Range Air Defence Battery, with Igla-S man portable air defence systems and Giraffe 1X radar (to be equipped with IRIS-T SLM)
      - Very Short Range Air Defence Battery, with Igla-S man portable air defence systems
    - 16th Airspace Surveillance and Control Center, at Brnik Air Base
      - Airspace Surveillance and Control Company
      - Radar Company (Radar stations in Vrhnika and Hočko Pohorje), with Ground Master 403 radars
      - Support Platoon
    - 107th Air Base, at Cerklje ob Krki Air Base
      - Cerklje ob Krki Air Base Support Company
      - Jernej Molan Barracks Unit
    - 151st Helicopter Squadron, at Cerklje ob Krki Air Base
      - Bell 412 Helicopter Section
      - AS 532 AL Cougar Helicopter Section
      - Aviation Technical Company
    - 152nd Aviation Squadron, at Cerklje ob Krki Air Base
      - 1st Combat Aircraft Section, with PC-9M Hudournik
      - 2nd Combat Aircraft Section, with PC-9M Hudournik
      - Air Transport Section, with C-27J Spartan, PC-6 Porter, and Falcon 2000 EX
      - Aviation Technical Platoon
    - 153rd Aviation Technical Squadron, at Cerklje ob Krki Air Base
      - Aviation Technical Engineer Company
      - Aviation Technical Company (Aircraft maintenance)
      - Aviation Technical Company (Helicopter maintenance)
    - 155th Combat Unmanned Aircraft Squadron, at Cerklje ob Krki Air Base
    - Slovenian Armed Forces Flight School, at Cerklje ob Krki Air Base
      - 1st School Section, with Zlín Z-242 trainer aircraft
      - 2nd School Section, with Bell 206B helicopters
      - Parachute Sport Section
      - Aviation Technical Platoon
  - Logistics Brigade, in Kranj
    - 157th Logistics Battalion, in Šentvid
      - 1st Materiel Maintenance Company
      - 2nd Materiel Maintenance Company
      - 3rd Materiel Maintenance Company
      - Infrastructure Maintenance Platoon
      - Spare Parts Storage and Distribution Unit
    - 670th Logistics Support Battalion, in Slovenska Bistrica
      - Service Company
      - Supply Company
      - 1st Transport Company
      - 2nd Transport Company
      - Materiel Supply Company
      - Materiel Resources and Uniforms Depot
      - Driving School
    - Military Medical Unit, in Šentvid
      - Health Center, in Šentvid
      - Medical Company West, in Šentvid
      - Medical Company East, in Maribor
      - Role 2 Light Mobile Hospital, in Slovenska Bistrica
      - Medical Logistic Platoon, in Šentvid
      - Veterinary Unit, in Kočevska Reka
        - Veterinary Clinic
        - Epidemiological Center
        - Military Working Dogs Breeding and Training Unit
  - 430th Naval Division, in Ankaran
    - Maritime Operations Center
    - Underwater Special Operations Detachment
    - Multipurpose Vessels Detachment
      - Multipurpose Ship Triglav 11
      - Fast Patrol Ship Ankaran 21
  - Special Operations Unit, in Kočevska Reka
    - Special Operations Company
    - Combat Service Support Company
    - Special Operations Training Center
  - 5th Intelligence and Reconnaissance Battalion, in Vrhnika
    - 1st Intelligence and Reconnaissance Company
    - 2nd Intelligence and Reconnaissance Company
    - Electronic Warfare Unit
  - 11th Communications, Informatics and Cyber Defence Regiment, in Vrhnika
    - 104th Signal Battalion, in Vrhnika
    - 1st Signal Company, in Ljubljana (operationally assigned to the 1st Brigade)
    - 22nd Cyber Defense Unit, in Vrhnika
    - 52nd Signal Company, in Ljubljana
    - 72nd Signal Company, in Maribor (operationally assigned to the 72nd Brigade)
    - 111th Support Platoon, in Vrhnika
  - 14th Engineer Battalion, in Novo Mesto
    - Command and Logistics Platoon
    - Combat Engineer Company
    - General Engineer Company
    - EOD Platoon
  - 17th Military Police Battalion, in Ljubljana
    - Command and Logistics Platoon
    - 1st Military Police Company
    - 2nd Military Police Company
    - 3rd Military Police Company
  - 18th Chemical, Biological, Radiological, and Nuclear (CBRN) Defence Battalion, in Kranj
    - Command and Logistics Company
    - 1st Multi-purpose Company, with Cobra 4×4 vehicles
    - 2nd Multi-purpose Company, in Celje, with Cobra 4×4 vehicles
    - Mobile CBRN Laboratories Company
    - Training Unit, in Celje

== Military facilities ==
=== Barracks ===
As of 2024 there are currently 19 military barracks used by the Slovenian Armed Forces.

=== Airports ===
The Slovenian Armed Forces currently actively use the military part of the international Brnik Airport and the military airport Cerklje ob Krki near the town of Brežice, which serves as the home base of the 15th Wing of the Slovenian Army.

== Armed Forces Command organization graphic ==
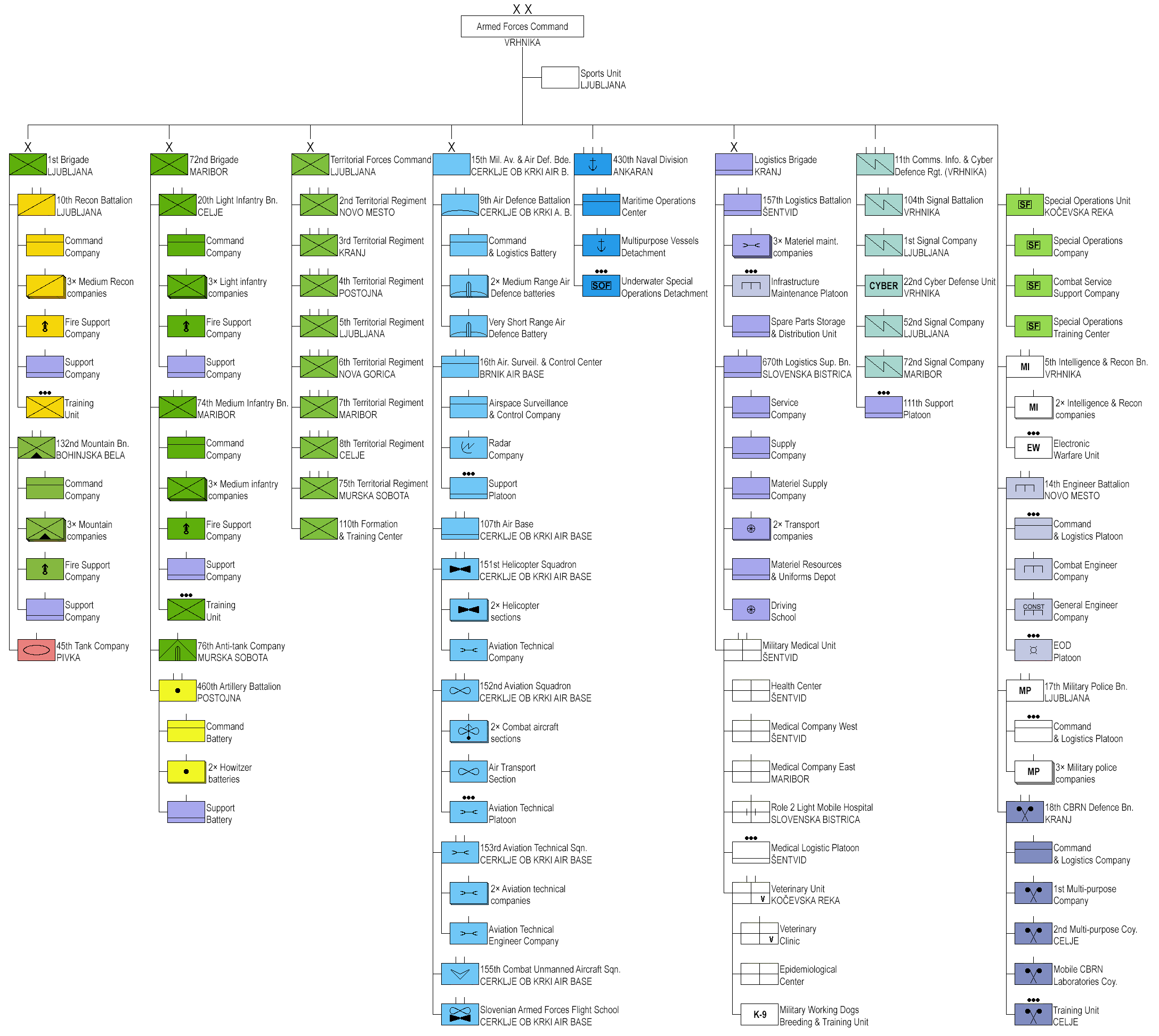
Armed Forces Command organization March 2026

== Geographic distribution of operational units ==
Slovenian Armed Forces Command locations 2026
Air Bases GM 403 radar station Naval Base
