= List of barracks of the Slovenian Armed Forces =

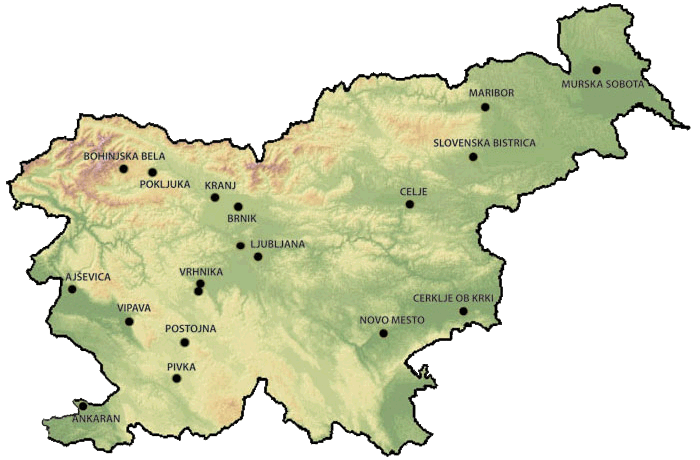
Map of Slovenian Army barracks in Slovenia

The following is a list of barracks of the Slovenian Armed Forces, including barracks that have been abandoned.

As of 2024, the SAF barracks are open to the public on open-door days.

== Large barracks ==
- Jernej Molan Barracks (Cerklje ob Krki)
- Edvard Peperko Barracks (Ljubljana)
- General Rudolf Maister Barracks (Maribor)
- 26 October Barracks (Vrhnika)
- Kranj Barracks (Kranj)
- Franc Uršič Barracks (Novo Mesto)
- Baron Andrej Čehovin Barracks (Postojna)
- Slovenian Territorial Defence Barracks (Ljubljana)
- Cadeten Institut Maribor Barracks

== Small barracks ==
- Bršljin Barracks (Celje)
- Bohinjska Bela Barracks
- Janko Premrl - Vojko Barracks (Vipava)
- Murska Sobota Barracks (Murska Sobota)
- Stanislav Požar Barracks (Pivka)
- Ptuj Barracks (Ptuj)
- Vincenc Repnik Barracks (Slovenska Bistrica)
- Slovenian Naval Barracks (Ankaran)
- Ajševica Barracks (Nova Gorica)
