= Policijski Pihalni Orkester =

Orchestra of policemen from Slovenia

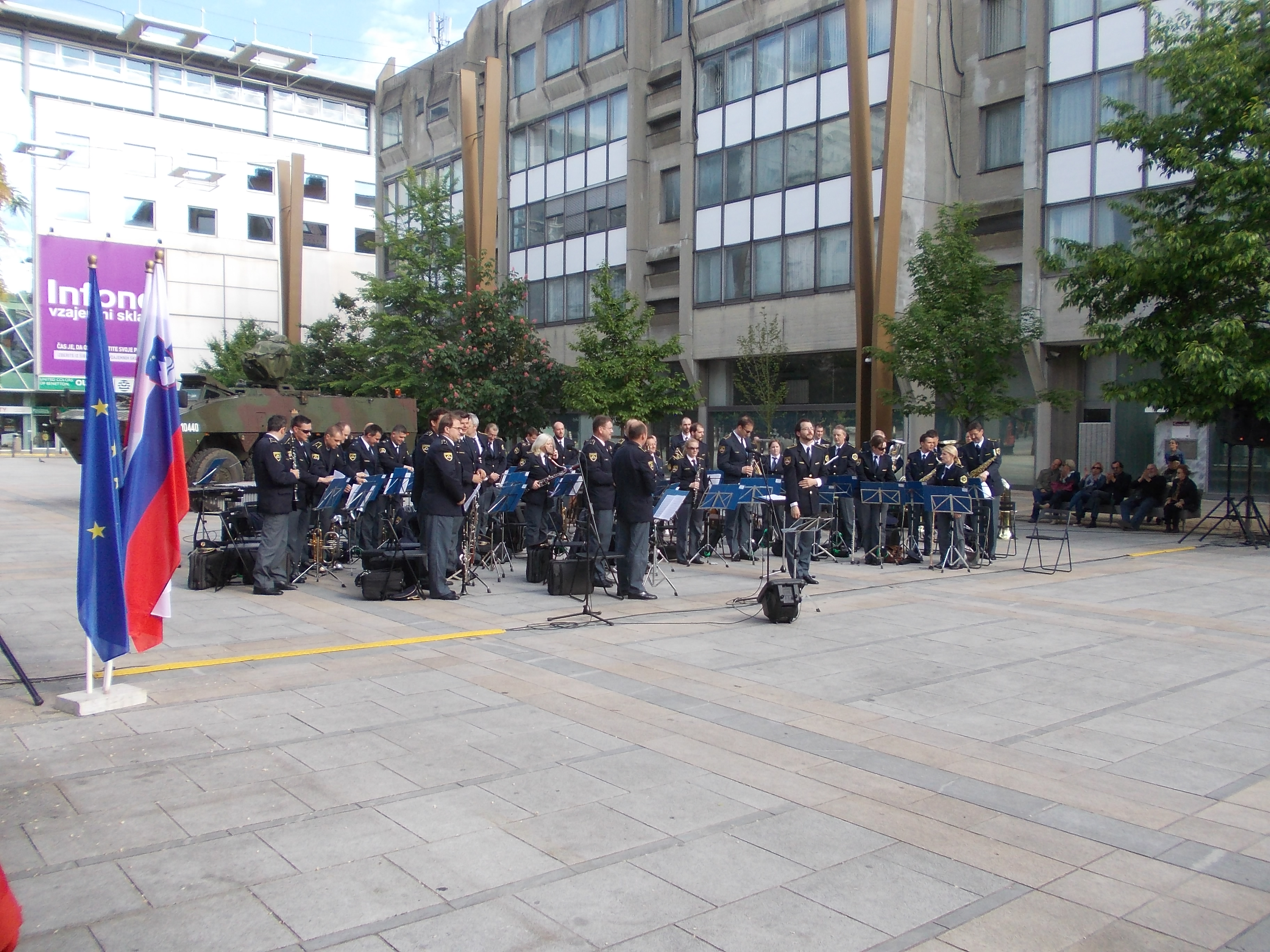
The band in a concert setting.

The Policijski Pihalni Orkester (transl. Police Wind Band) is a police band from Slovenia which represents the Slovenian National Police Force through their ceremonial music and public duties. It plays at celebrations, anniversaries and full-length concerts. In addition to state protocol duties, the 60-member band arranges appearances on behalf of the Police and the Ministry of the Interior. The band has performed at events in North Macedonia, Switzerland, Germany, Italy, Austria, Hungary and England. The band is currently housed in Galet Castle at Vodnikova 43 in Sisak in Ljubljana.

== History ==
After the Second World War ended, a need for a protocol band in the newly formed Socialist Republic of Slovenia in a reinvigorated Yugoslavia arose. The band was founded in the summer of 1948 as the Godba Lukovica People's Militia Band in SFR Yugoslavia. It consisted of 20 musicians under the leadership of Vinko Štrucl. In October 1948, bandmaster Rudolf Starič, was appointed as the first conductor. Many of the first bandsmen had no musical education, which resulted in the Ministry of the Interior founding a three-year early morning music school, which was mandatory for all bandsmen. It played for the first time at the May Day parade in Ljubljana in 1949, which was followed by the increase in members to by 56 members. At the same time a 13-member entertainment group was formed in the band. The music school closed down in 1964, with the educational aspect being transferred to the Academy of Music.

In 1972, the People's Militia Band was renamed to simply "The Militia Band". The band's size would then grow exponentially. On its 30th anniversary in 1978, the band leadership was given to Vinko Štrucl Jr., who is today recognized as one of the best composers for wind orchestras. Under his leadership, the entire brass band participated in the production of Don Carlos in Slovenia. During the Ten-Day War of 1991, bandsmen contributed to Slovenian Territorial Defence's fight against troops of the Yugoslav People's Army, supplying arms to the TOS and performing at the funerals of six militiamen.

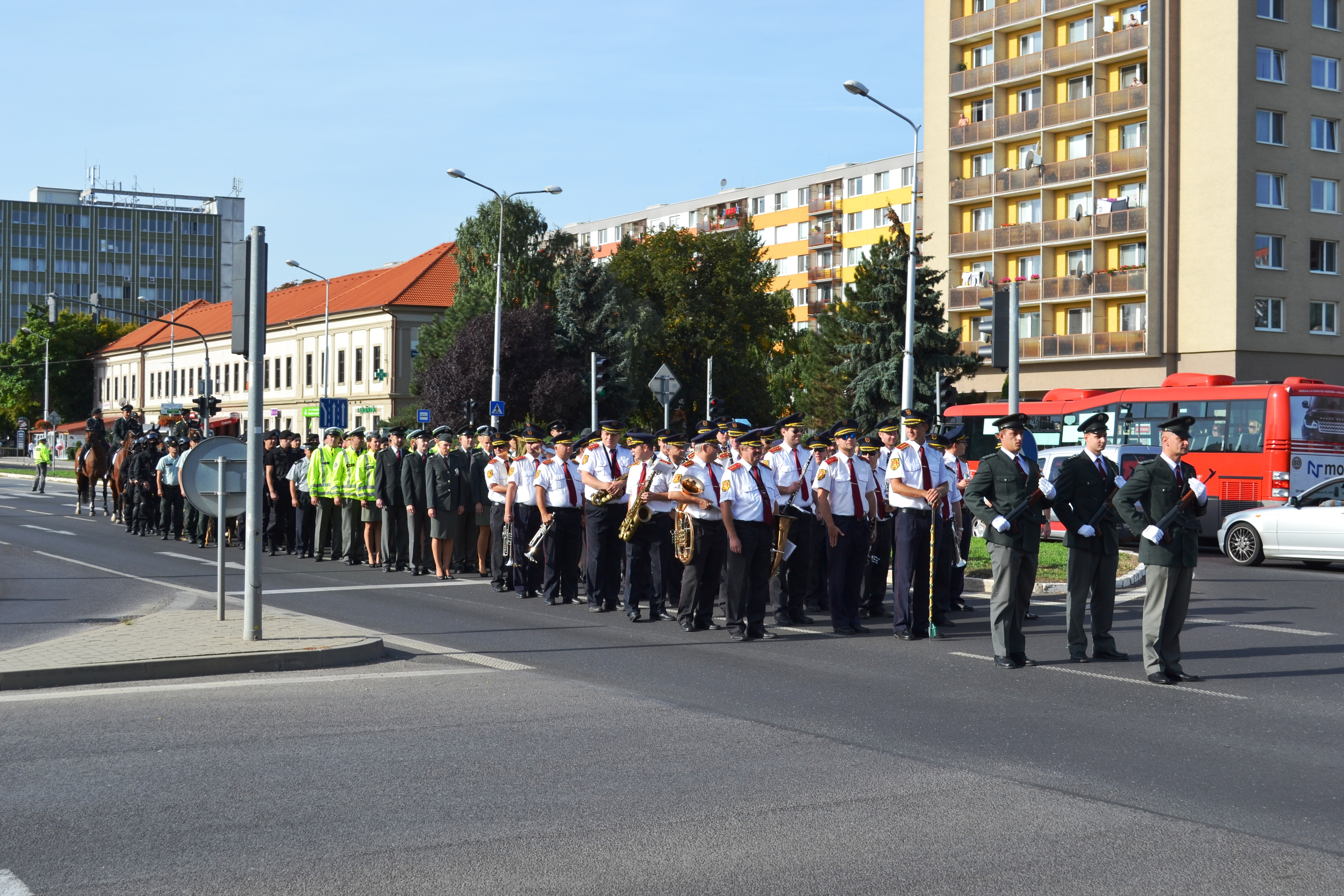
The band during a street parade.

With reestablishment of the militia as the police, the Militia Band became the Police Brass Band in 1992. In the mid-90s, a precondition for new members to join the band came into effect, introducing a requirement of at least two years of training at a music academy. In 1994, the Slovene government appointed the band the official protocol units in the republic. The band was therefore present for the first official visit to independent Slovenia, by Italian President Francesco Cossiga. It also performed in Budapest in 1994 at the Festival of Police Bands of Europe. Since 2001, it has been officially been known by its current name. The band most recently celebrated its 55th, 65th and 70th anniversaries with concerts at the Cankar Centre, where they also holds a Christmas and New Year's concert every year.

The following police officers have served as directors of the band since 1948:

- Rudolf Starič (1948-1964)
- Jože Hriberšek (1965-1978)
- Vinko Štrucl Jr (1978-1984)
- Franc Gornik (1984-1991)
- Milivoj Šurbek (1991-2000)
- Franc Rizmal (2000–Present)

== See also ==
- Slovene Military Orchestra
