= 26 October Barracks =

Former Slovenian Armed Forces barracks

Coordinates: 45°58′21.33″N 14°17′26.57″E

Ivan Cankar Barracks are a base of the Slovenian Armed Forces, located south of Vrhnika in Vrhnika Municipality, central Slovenia.

A park in front of the barracks contains two monuments to the liberation struggle during World War II and is listed as cultural heritage.

== History ==
Slovenian Territorial Defence occupied the barracks on 25 October 1991, after the Yugoslav People's Army withdrew from it. The next day, the JNA withdrew from the entire territory of Slovenia, and later the barracks, which was formerly called Barracks of Ivan Cankar, was named after 26 October (the same event is celebrated on the state level as Sovereignty Day, but on 25 October).

The army ceased to use the complex in 2011, after which the objets were unused. One of the buildings was reactivated during the height of the European migrant crisis in 2015 as temporary shelter for refugees.

The army began using the base again in the late 2010s. Currently they are used by the Slovenian Army Forces Command and the Communications and ICT unit of the Slovenian Army.

== Commander ==
- Colonel Vojteh Mihevc (2000 – )

== Units ==
52nd Brigade of the Slovenian Armed Forces (former)

530th Slovenian army training center (former)

- Slovenian Army Forces Command (current)
