= Slovenian Army Orchestra =

Slovenian musical unit

Slovenian Army Orchestra Orkester Slovenske vojske
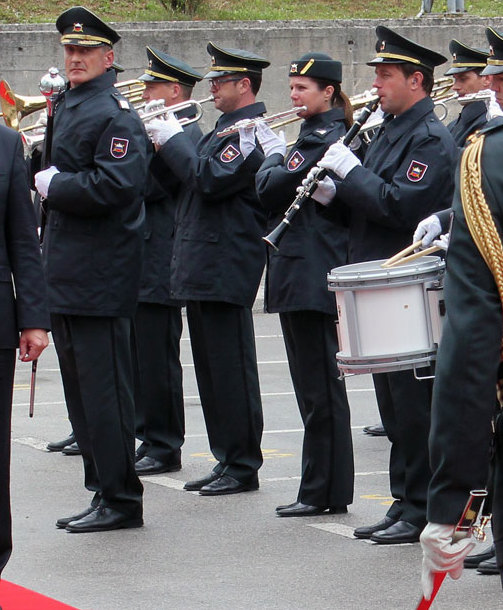
- The band at an official honours ceremony for Defence Minister Andreja Katič and Prime Minister Miro Cerar.

Background information
- Origin: Slovenia
- Genres: Brass/marching music
- Years active: 1996

The Slovenian Army Orchestra (Orkester Slovenske vojske) is the musical ensemble of the Slovenian Armed Forces and a unit of the General Staff of the Slovenian Armed Forces in Ljubljana, being first in the order of battle in the SV. Also known by its acronym, the SAF Band, it consists of musicians with mainly an academic background. Anyone who wants to play in the orchestra must have at least a 1/5 of the required level of education in the field of music, and must successfully perform at an audition. Training also includes, as with all other SV units, drill and marching precision practice.

It was established in April 1996, with its first conductor being Franc Rizmal who served until October 2000. The tradition of military bands on Slovenian territory dates back to the second half of the 18th century with the SAF Band playing an integral part in that history in being the first unified Slovenian military band.

== Tasks ==
The band engages in the following daily tasks:

- Ceremonial Military Protocol Events
- Marching Parades
- Memorial ceremonies
- Charity and promotional concerts
- International Tattoo

In fulfilling these goals, the band sometimes cooperates with the Protocol Unit of the SV. An example of this relationship was seen publicly in Moscow in 2013, during the Spasskaya Tower Military Music Festival and Tattoo which took place that year.

Each year, the band plans concerts on national holidays (Slovenian Armed Forces Day, Statehood Day, Independence and Unity Day, Sovereignty Day, Christmas and New Year's Eve for example.)

== Composition ==
The SAF Band has several different ensembles. It is composed of 58 personnel, 48 of which are actual musicians while the other 10 are part of the band's staff. The band is divided into particular sections such as the following:

- Concert Band - The largest band. Performs at symphonic venues.
- Ceremony Band - Participates in receptions with military honors
- Big Band - Conducts concerts with various soloists and plays at various charity dances and events.
- Chamber Ensembles - Ensembles grouped together based on the instrument. They are indispensable for the opening of exhibitions and other cultural and artistic events.
  - Brass quintet
  - Clarinet quartet
  - Brass trio

== Uniform ==
The uniform of the SAF Military Band is worn by the band members at concerts or when representing the SAF Military Band. SAF Military Band uniform resembles the basic service dress, but is complemented by a golden yellow shoulder cord, coat and raincoat.

== Gallery ==
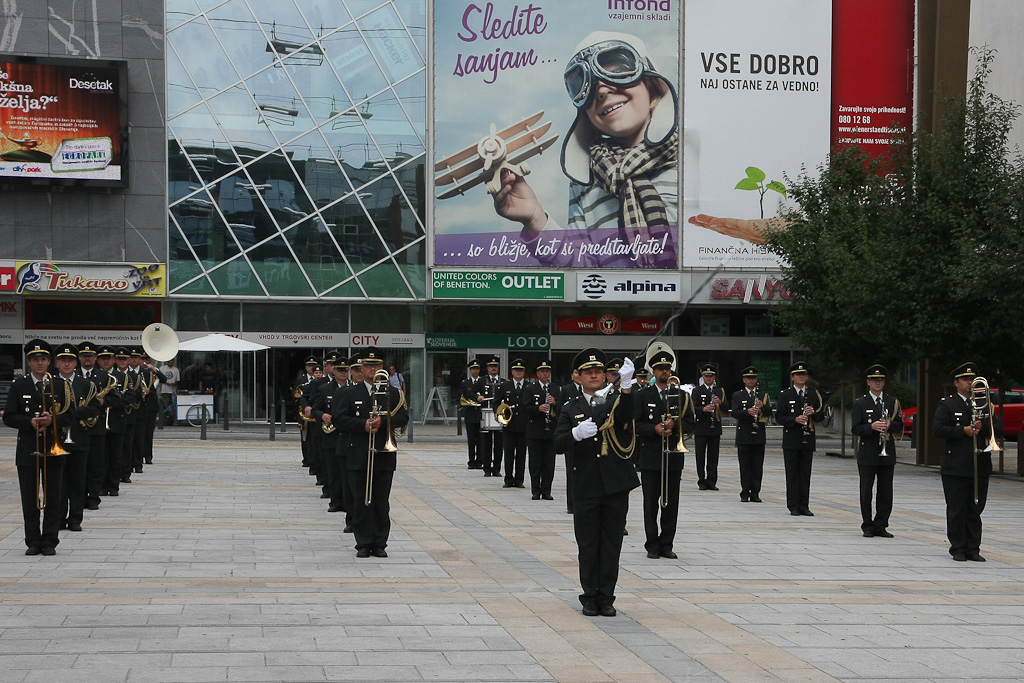
The band in a parade format

Performing the Slovenian National Anthem

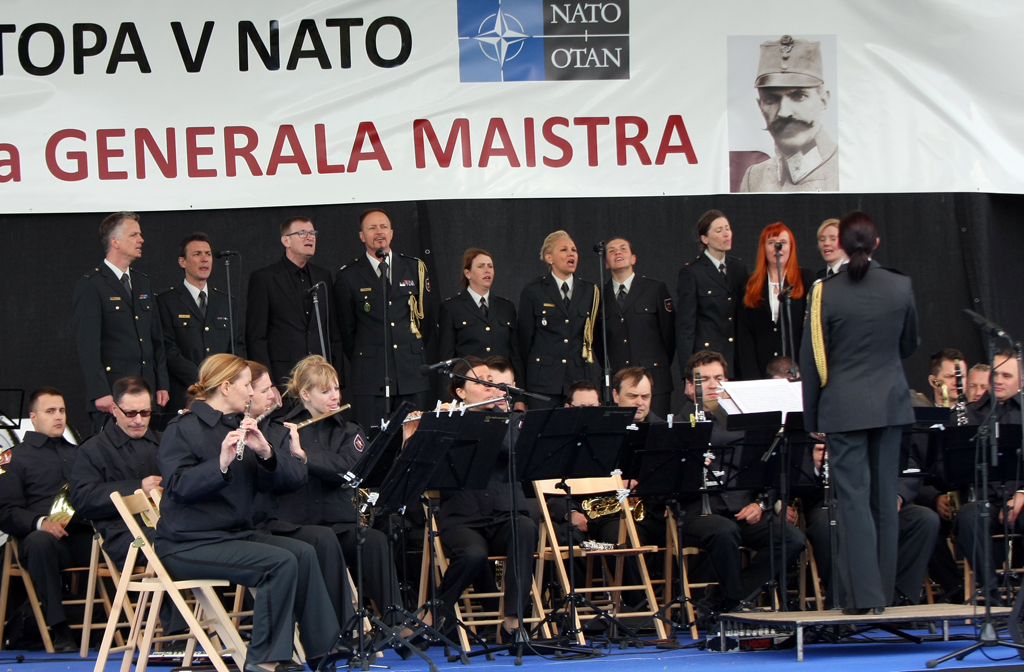

At a memorial ceremony at the Monument to the Battle of Dražgoše

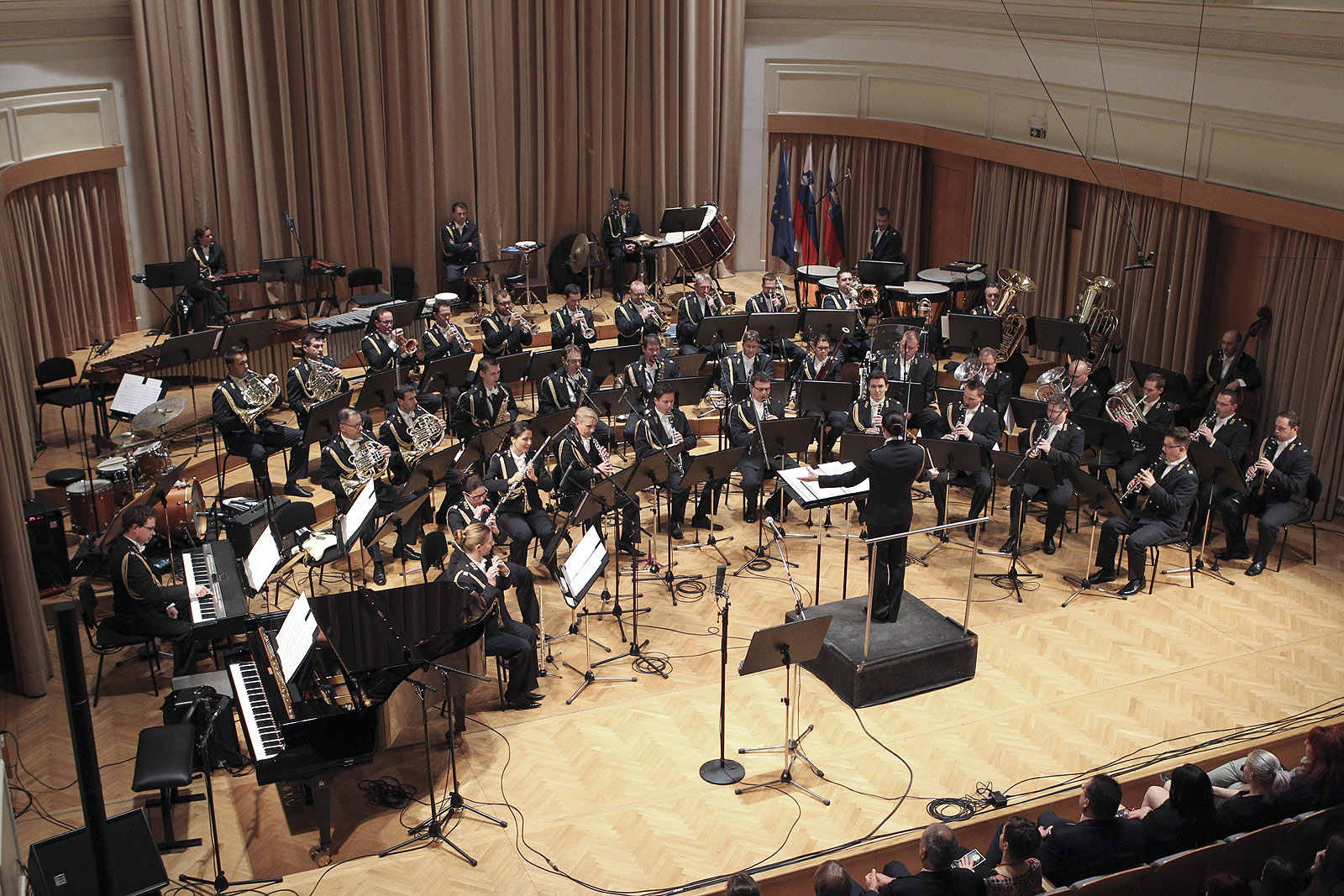
The band in a concert format
