= Edvard Peperko =

Slovenian soldier (1966–1991)

Edvard Peperko (2 June 1966 – 27 June 1991) was a Slovene soldier of the Slovenian Territorial Defense, who fought in the Ten-Day War.

== Life and death ==
Edvard Peperko was born in Kamnik and also lived in Domžale. He was one of the first to fall in Slovenia's Ten-Day War of independence. He was struck in the chest on 27 June 1991 by special forces in Trzin and severely wounded. An ambulance was called from Domžale to transport Peperko, but he died during transport near the Ljubljana suburb of Šentjakob ob Savi. He left behind a wife and two children.

== Distinctions and awards ==
In 1992, he was posthumously awarded the Order of Freedom of the Republic of Slovenia for “exceptional merit in the defense of freedom and establishing the sovereignty of the Republic of Slovenia.”

== Legacy ==
The Edvard Peperko Barracks in Ljubljana were named after Peperko in June 2012.
