= General Staff of the Slovenian Armed Forces =

The General Staff of the Slovenian Armed Forces (Slovene: Generalštab Slovenske vojske; abbreviation GŠSV) is the highest professional military body in Slovenia, operating within the Ministry of Defence of the Republic of Slovenia and responsible for leading the Slovenian Armed Forces. It is based at Vojkova 55 in Ljubljana (Kardeljeva platform). The current Chief of the General Staff is Brigadier General Boštjan Močnik.

== Organization ==
=== 2001 ===
- Chief of the General Staff
- Deputy Chief of the General Staff
- Assistant for Reorganization
- Operational Headquarters
- Personal Staff of the Chief of the General Staff
- Human Resources Department (J-1)
- Intelligence Sector (J-2)
- Operational Affairs Sector (J-3)
- Logistics Sector (J-4)
- Sector for Strategic Planning, Doctrine and Development (J-5)
- Information and Communication Affairs Sector (J-6)
- Programming and Resource Planning Sector (J-8)

=== 2003 ===
- Chief of the General Staff
- Deputy Chief of the General Staff
- Office of the Chief of the General Staff
- Director of Staff
- Joint Human Resources and Education Sector
- Intelligence and Security Affairs Sector
- Operational Affairs Department
- Joint Sector for Strategic Logistics
- Joint Planning and Development Sector
- Communications and Informatics Sector
- Civil-Military Relations and Support Sector

== Subordinate units ==
- Slovenian Armed Forces Verification Center
- Military Vicariate of the Slovenian Army
- Slovenian Army Protocol Unit
  - Slovenian Guards Unit
- Slovenian Army Orchestra
- Department for Airworthiness Control and Flight Safety of the Slovenian Armed Forces
- Slovenian Army Support Unit

== Leaders ==
=== Chiefs of the General Staff ===
- Captain Boris Geršak (December 21, 2018 - ?)
- Brigadier Mihec Škerbinc (October 3, 2018 - December 20, 2018)
- Brigadier Milan Žurman (March 26, 2018 - October 2, 2018)
- Brigadier Bojan Pograjc (12 May 2017 - 25 March 2018)
- Brigadier Milko Petek (February 1, 2017 - May 11, 2017)
- ? (November 3, 2014 - January 31, 2017)
- Brigadier David Humar (January 1, 2013 - November 2, 2014)
- Brigadier General Alenka Ermenc (April 10, 2012 - December 31, 2012)
- Brigadier Vladimir Maher (May 5, 2009 - April 9, 2012)
- Brigadier Branimir Furlan (November 1, 2006 - May 4, 2009)
- Brigadier Alojz Šteiner (March 1, 2006 - October 30, 2006)
- Colonel Dragan Bavčar (2005)
- Brigadier General Jožef Žunkovič (2004)

=== Chief Non-Commissioned Officers ===
- Senior Warrant Officer Danijel Kovač (December 21, 2018 - Present)
- Staff Ensign Igor Tomašič (July 1, 2009 - December 21, 2018)
