= Pandur I (6×6) =

Pandur 6×6 APC
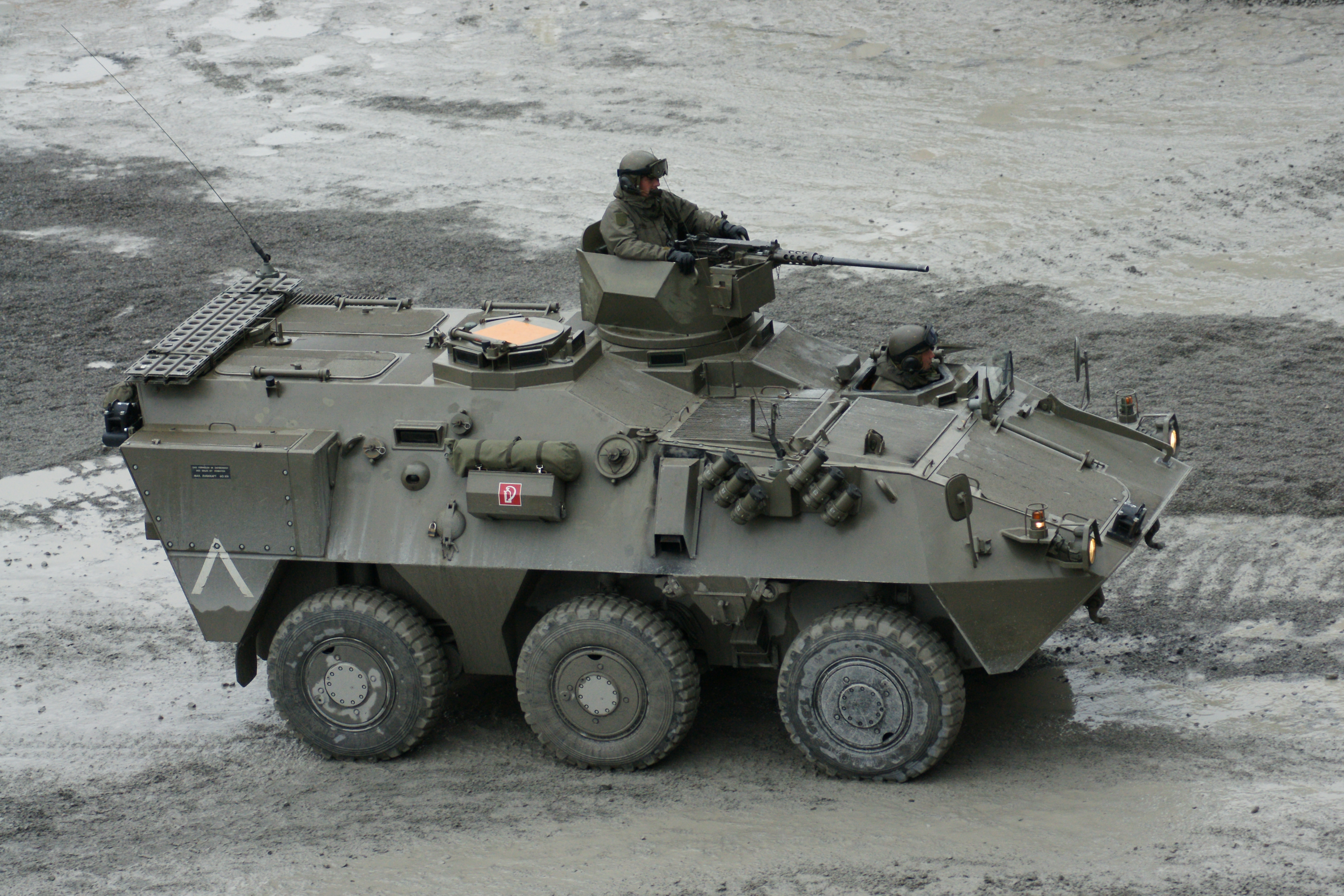
- Pandur I in use with the Austrian Army
- Type: Armoured personnel carrier
- Place of origin: Austria

Service history
- In service: 1996–present
- Used by: See Operators

Production history
- Designed: 1980s
- Manufacturer: Steyr-Daimler-Puch
- Developed into: Pandur II (8×8)

Specifications
- Mass: 13.5 tonnes
- Length: 5.7 m (18 ft 8 in)
- Width: 2.5 m (8 ft 2 in)
- Height: 1.82 m (6.0 ft)
- Crew: 2 + 8 passengers
- Armor: protection against 12.7mm rounds in the 30° frontal arc and against 7.62mm rounds everywhere else
- Main armament: 1 x 12.7mm M2 Browning heavy machine gun (other options available)
- Engine: Steyr 6-cylinder turbo-charged diesel 194 kW (260 bhp) at 2,400 rpm
- Operational range: 700 km (430 mi)
- Maximum speed: 100 km/h (62 mph)

The Pandur is an APC developed and produced by the Austrian company Steyr-Daimler-Puch Spezialfahrzeuge (SSF). It was developed during the 1980s as a private venture. In 2003, General Dynamics took over Steyr-Daimler-Puch which is now part of General Dynamics European Land Systems (GD ELS), which is also the parent company of MOWAG, Santa Bárbara Sistemas and GDELS – Germany.

== Armament ==
The baseline vehicle is armed with a 12.7 mm (.50 cal) heavy machine gun. Its modular design allows it to be fitted with a variety of weapon systems, including a 20 mm autocannon and an armored two-man 90 mm gun turret. Some Slovenian Pandur 1 (Valuk) are armed with a 40mm automatic grenade launchers with different ammunition like HE, HEDP, smoke and so on.

== Variants ==
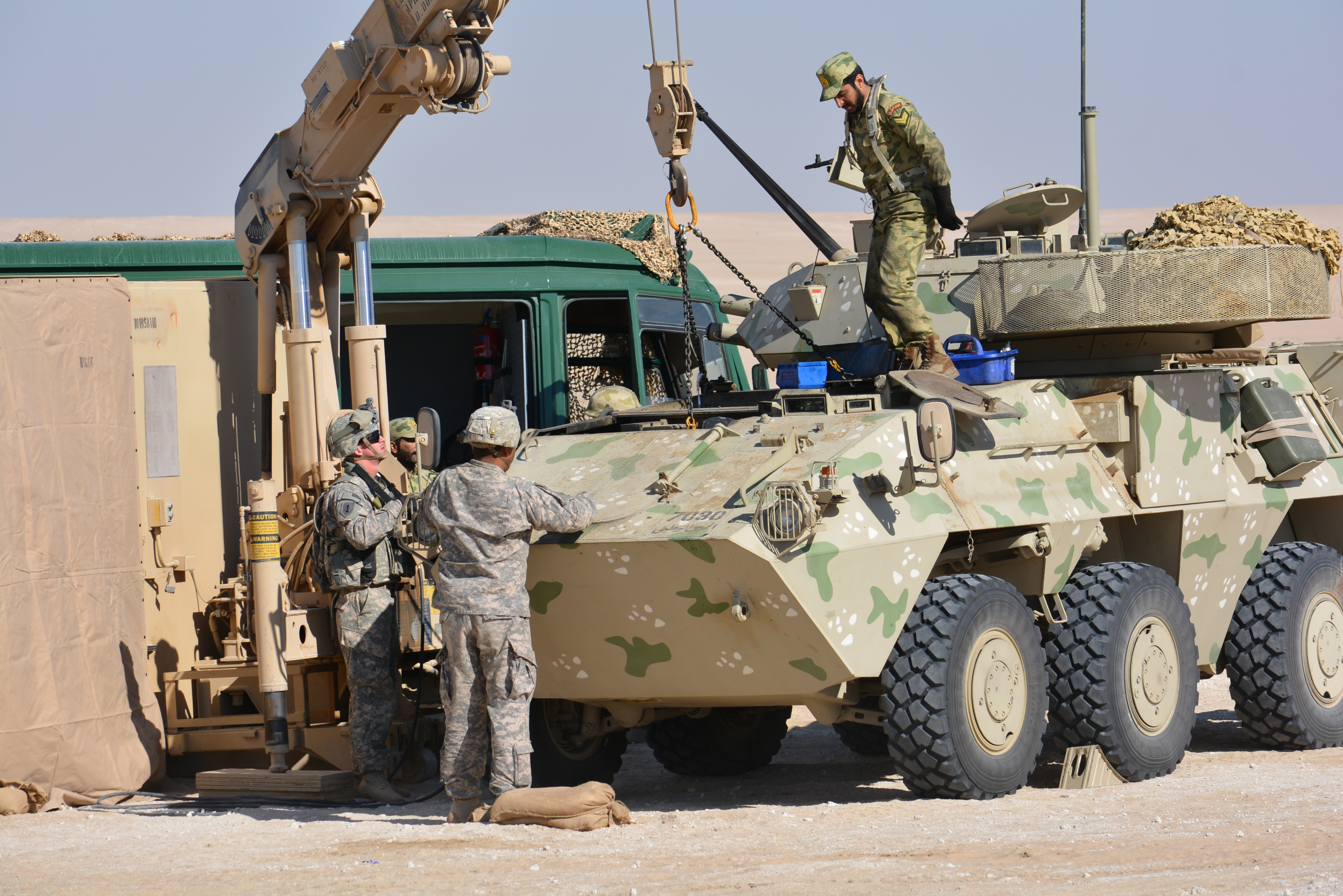
Pandur IFV of the Kuwait National Guard.

- Pandur I
  - Model A – extended centre roof
    - Armoured Personnel Carrier
    - Ambulance
    - Anti-tank vehicle
    - Repair and recovery vehicle
    - Command post vehicle
    - Infantry fighting vehicle (Valuk)
  - Model B – flat roof
    - Amphibious vehicle – greater buoyancy and is propelled in the water by two water jets
    - Mortar carrier
    - Reconnaissance Fire Support Vehicle
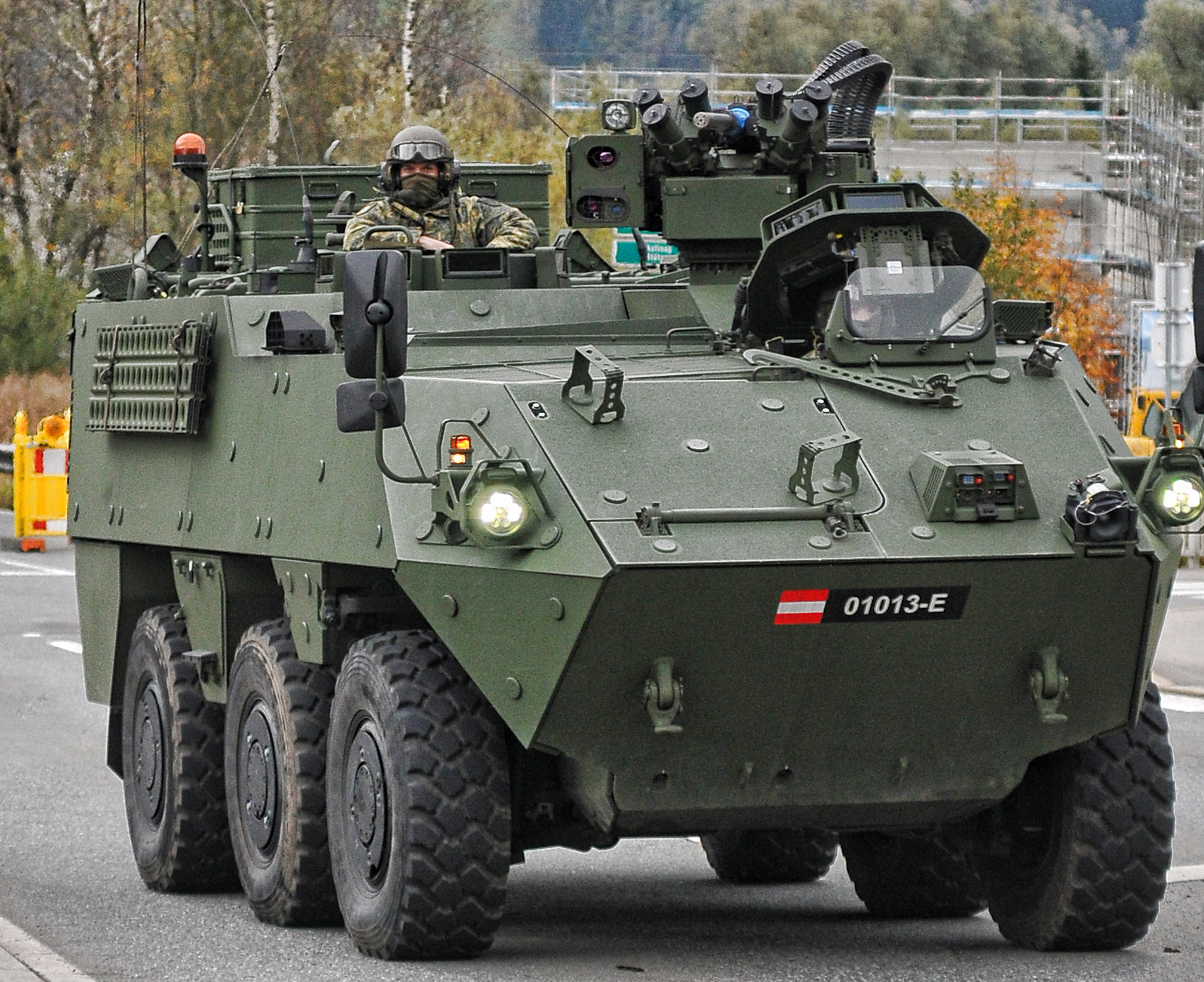
- Pandur EVO MTPz
  Pandur I EVO
  - Pandur Evo MTPz (in the Austrian Army)
    - MTPz, "Mannschaftstransportpanzer", an armoured personnel carrier
    - MTPz PAL, "Panzerabwehrlenkwaffe", a tank destroyer
    - MTPz Aufkl, "Aufklärung", a scout vehicle
    - MTPz JFS, "Joint Fire Support", a joint fire support vehicle that coordinates artillery, mortar, aircraft fire
    - MTPz Fü, "Führung", a command and control vehicle
    - MTPz SGrW, "schwere Granatwerfer", a 120 mm mortar carrier equipped with an Elbit Crossbow turret
    - MTPz FIA, "Flakpanzer", a self-propelled anti-air gun with a Skyranger 30 turret equipped with Mistral 3 missiles
    - MTPz SAN, "Sanität", an armoured ambulance that exists in two variants
      - CASEVAC variant
      - MEDEVAC variant
    - MTPz Pi, "Pionier", an armoured engineering vehicle
    - MTPz FüU, a communication vehicle
    - MTPz ERFOS, "Erfassungs- und Ortungssystem", electronic warfare / SIGINT vehicle
    - MTPz STÖRSYS, "Störsystems", an electronic warfare / radio jamming vehicle
  - Pandur EVO Spezialkräfte, a special forces variant proposed by GDELS, equipped with a Valhalla 30mm turret, an anti-drone net, and canisters that can launch the Switchblade 300 Block 20 loitering munition.
  - Pandur EVO Flugabwehrvariante, with the Moog RIwP anti-air turret installed.

== Operators ==
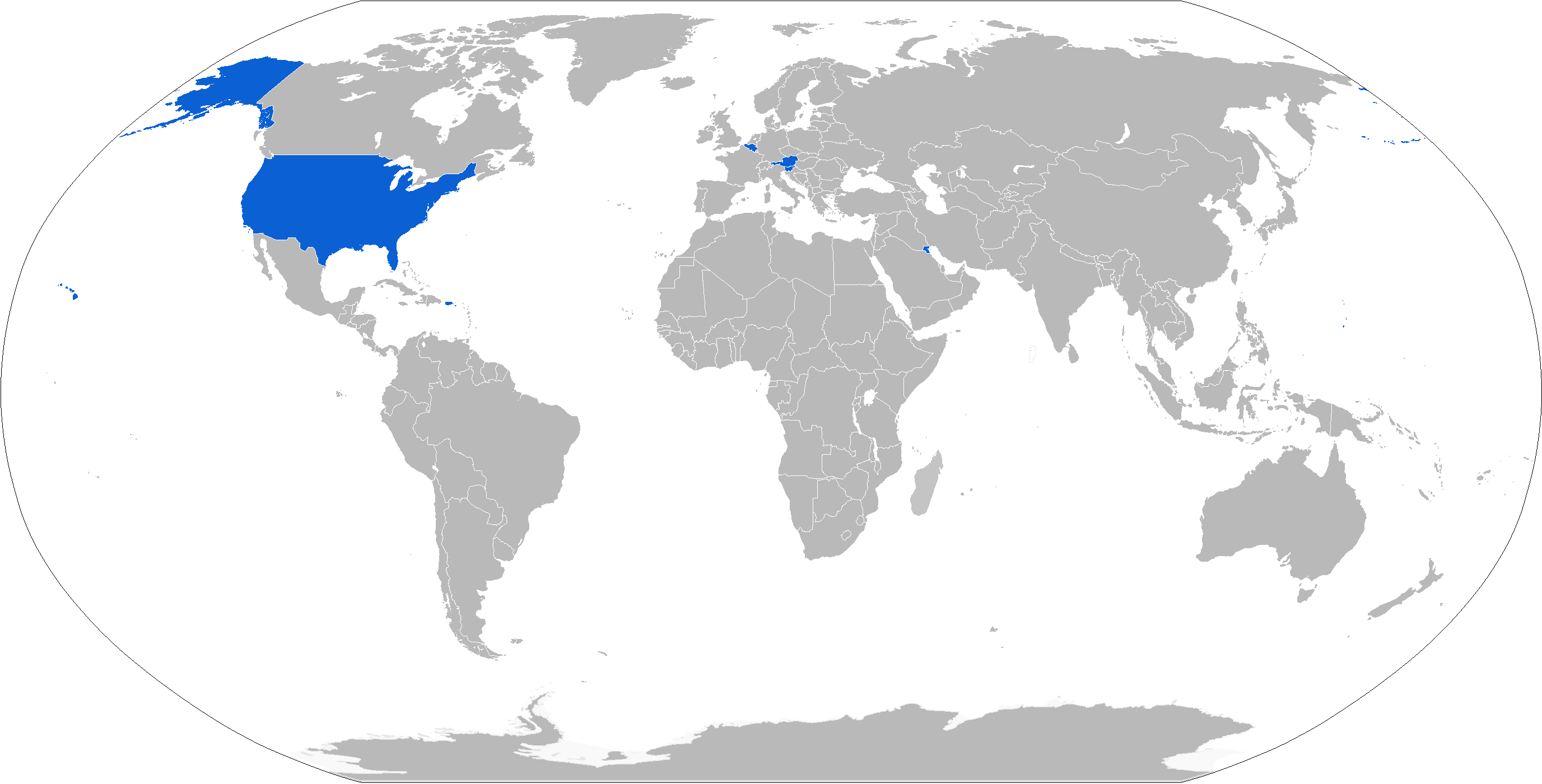
Map of Pandur 1 operators in blue with former operators in red

=== Current operators ===
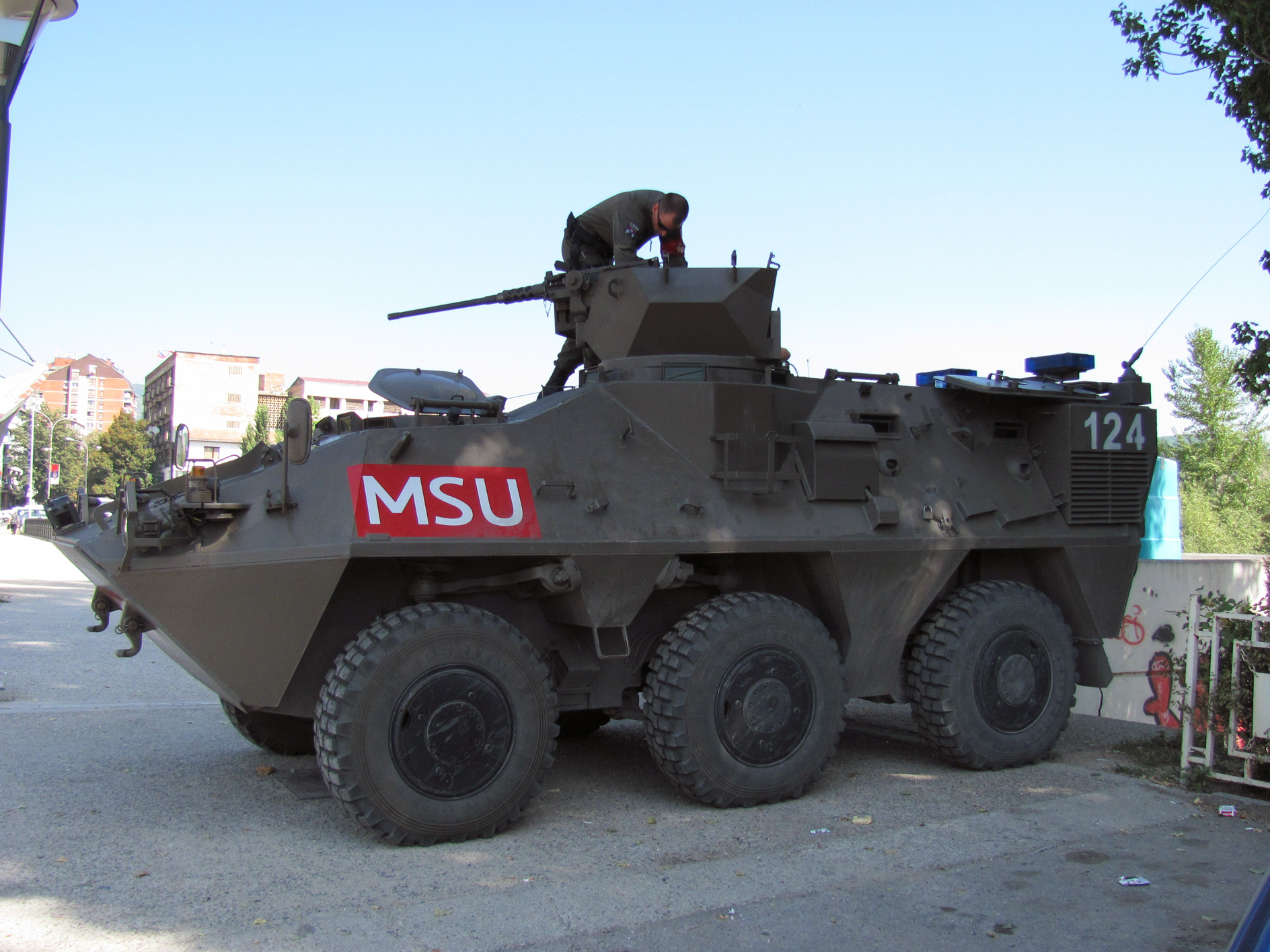
KFOR-MSU Pandur I near the Ibar Bridge, in Mitrovica, Kosovo. Note the special "blue light" system on the back.(2011).

==== Pandur I ====
Austria (71 purchased new, 7 purchased second-hand)
Purchases by the Austrian Armed Forces
- 68 APC ordered in the 1990s, and it entered service in 1996
- 3 ambulance purchased for €3.8 million and entered service in 2003
- 6 Pandur Recce & Observation (ISTAR) and 1 ambulance were purchased second-hand from the Belgian Army in 2016, used as spare parts

Belgium (60 purchased new, 7 sold second-hand)
60 built in Belgium between 1996 and 1998 under licence. Purchase:
- 46 Pandur Recce & Observation (ISTAR)
- 10 Pandur Ambulance
- 4 Pandur Maintenance
6 Pandur Recce & Observation (ISTAR) and 1 ambulance were sold second-hand to the Austrian Armed Forces in 2016, used for spare parts

Gabon (1)
1 purchased by the Gabonese Army

Kuwait (70)
Ordered for the Kuwait National Guard (70 in 6 versions, produced by AV Technology).

Slovenia (85 purchased, 20 donated)
85 Pandur produced locally under license, known as LKOV Valuk. 20 donated to Ukraine. The variants are:
- APC
- Ambulance
- Mortar carrier with CARDOM 120 mm mortar
- Scout with RAFAEL Rafael Overhead Weapon Station (OWS-25) and 25 mm M242 Bushmaster automatic cannon

Ukraine (20 second-hand)
Donated by Slovenia to the Ukrainian Ground Forces in April 2023.

United States (50)
Purchased for the US Army (50, produced by AV Technology as the Armored Ground Mobility System for USASOC Special Forces/Special Operations Forces units).

==== Pandur EVO 6×6 ====
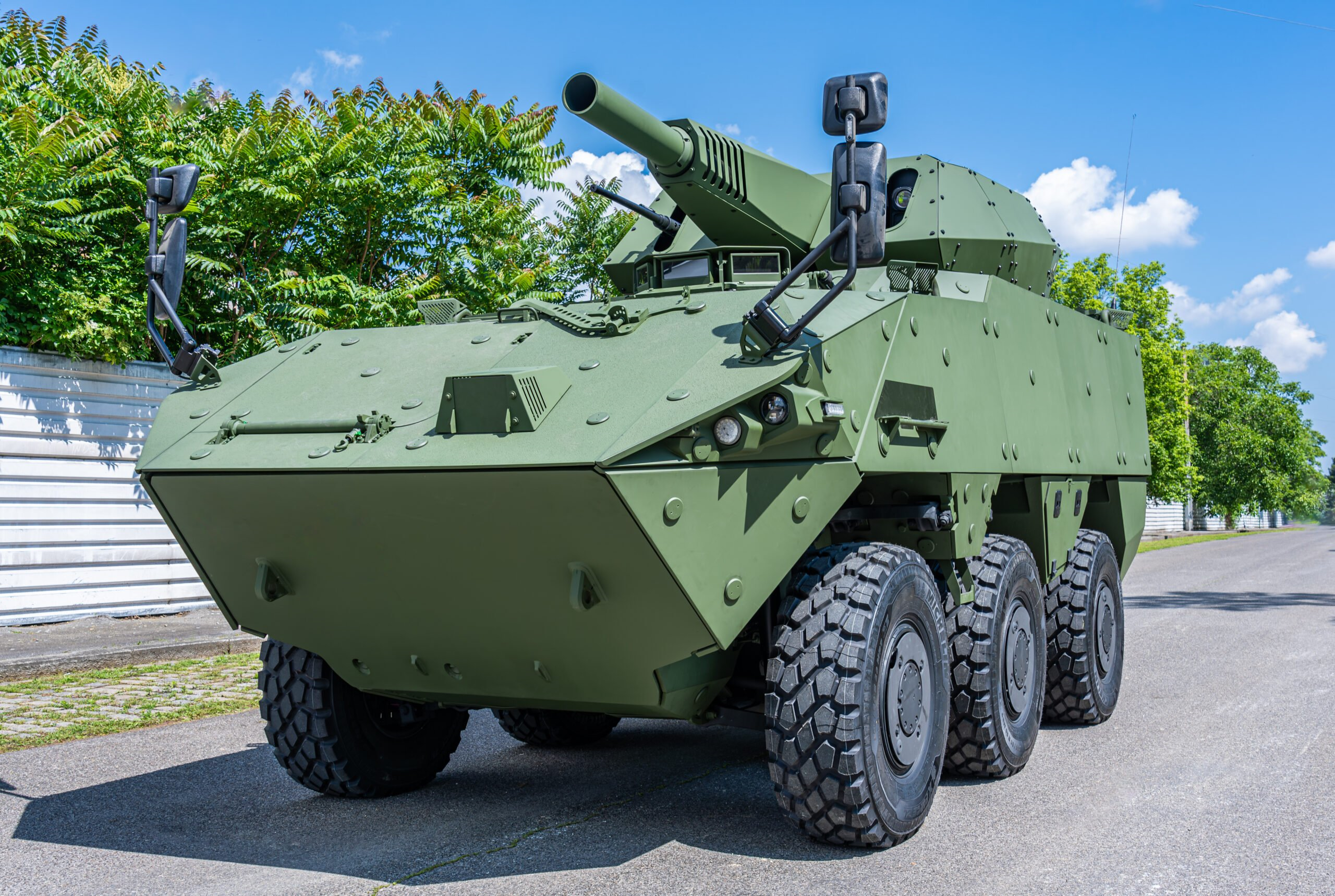
Pandur EVO MTPz SGrW (Elbit Crossbow 120mm mortar turret)

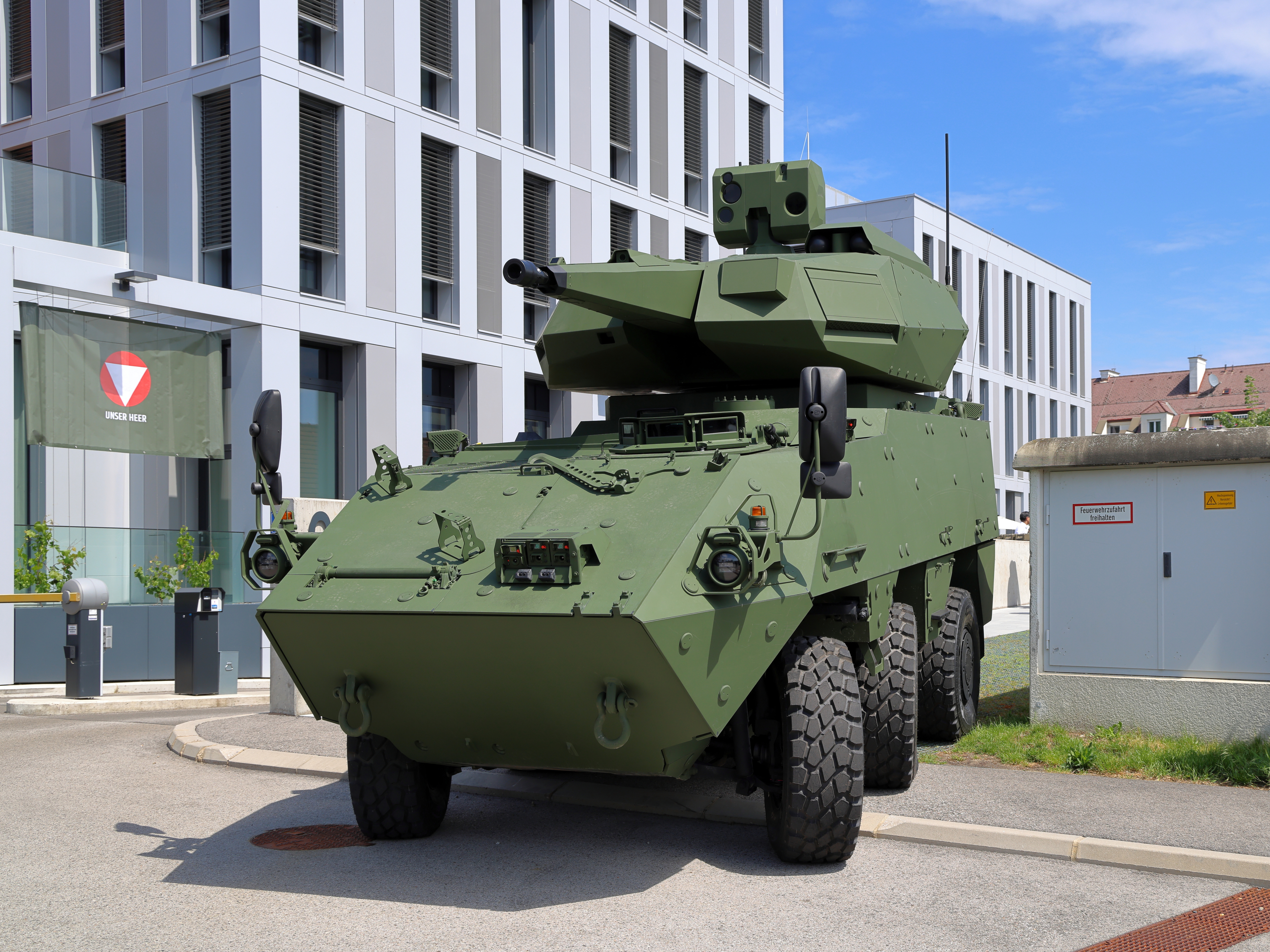
Pandur EVO with Skyranger 30

Austria (325 ordered, 64 delivered)
Austrian Armed Forces (325 ordered)

- 34 armoured personnel carrier (known as "Mannschaftstransportpanzer" or MTPz) ordered on 22 December 2016 to GDELS Steyr for €105 million
- 30 APC were ordered and delivered by 2023
- 36 APC were ordered in September 2022
- 225 Pandur EVO 6×6 were ordered in multiple variants in February 2024 for €1.8 billion. This purchase includes the varriants:
  - APC (known as "Mannschaftstransportpanzer" or "MTPz"), unknown quantity
  - Tank destroyer (known as "Panzerabwehrlenkwaffe" or "PAL"), unknown quantity, equipped with the future anti-tank missile
  - Scout vehicle (known as "Aufklärung" or Aufkl), unknown quantity
  - Coordination tactical fire support (known as "Joint Fire Support" or JFS), unknown quantity
  - Command and control (known as "Führung" or Fü), unknown quantity
  - Mortar carrier (known as "schwere Granatwerfer" or sGrW), equipped with the Elbit Crossbow 120 turret, unknown quantity
  - 36 VSHORAD / SPAAG (known as "Flakpanzer" or FlA) + 9 option, equipped with the Skyranger 30 A3 turret
  - Armoured ambulance (known as "Sanität" or SAN), unknown quantity
    - CASEVAC
    - MEDEVAC
  - Armoured engineering vehicle (known as "Pionier" or Pi), unknown quantity
  - Communication (known as FüU), unknown quantity
  - Electronic warfare / SIGINT (known as "Erfassungs- und Ortungssystem" or ERFOS), unknown quantity
  - Electronic warfare / Radio jamming (known as "Störsystems" or STÖRSYS), unknown quantity

=== Future operators ===
==== Pandur EVO 6×6 ====
United States
The US Department of Defence announced at the end of June 2022 the order of the Armored Ground Mobility System Heavy Platform Vehicles (AGMS) for US$55.85 million. The procurement should be completed by mid-2025. The vehicle will equip the USASOC Special Forces/Special Operations Forces, and is meant to replace the Pandur I Armored Ground Mobility System.

=== Potential operators ===
==== Pandur EVO 6×6 ====
Slovenia (14)
Slovenian army requested 14 new Pandur EVO in late 2019. Austria is offering a government to government contract with Slovenia as GDELS is willing to offer the 14 Pandur EVO to the army. Currently waiting for the new government to decide for the purchase. Estimated cost is around 40 million Euro.

Spain
The Spanish Army is looking for a 6×6 vehicle for its cavalry. The Pandur I Evo is being considered, among many other options.

=== Failed bids ===
==== Pandur EVO 6×6 ====
Germany
The Pandur Evo 6×6 was in competition for 3 programmes:
- A new multi role vehicle as a successor to the TPz Fuchs. The main variant will be an armoured personnel carrier, and specialised variants are expected to be purchased as well. In January 2025, the Patria 6×6 won the bid, and Germany requested a first offer for 300 vehicles.
- A new mortar carrier is part of the German renewal of the indirect fire support programme. It is known as "Zukünftiges System Indirektes Feuer kleiner Reichweite" (ZukSysIndF kRw), and up to 120 such systems were expected to be purchased, and based on the TPz Fuchs successor, so potentially the Pandur Evo 6×6. As the Patria 6×6 won the bid for the TPz Fuchs successor, the Patria NEMO is likely to win this contract.
- The Korsak programme, successor of the Fennek reconnaissance vehicle saw the Pandur Evo as a potential successor. In 2024, a variant of the Piranha IV replaced the Pandur Evo offer from the GDELS group. And the Piranha is likely to win the contract.

== See also ==
Related designs

- Pandur II

Comparable 6x6 systems

- TPz Fuchs – (West Germany)
- Patria Pasi – (Finland)
- Patria 6x6 – (Finland)
- VEC-M1 – (Spain)
- LAV I – (Canada)
- VBTP-MR Guarani – (Brazil)
- Otokar Arma – (Turkey)
- Ratel IFV – (South Africa)
- Type 87 RCV – (Japan)
- WZ-551 – (China)
- Anoa (armoured personnel carrier) – (Indonesia)
