= General Maister Barracks =

Coordinates: 46°32′52.72″N 15°37′48.87″E

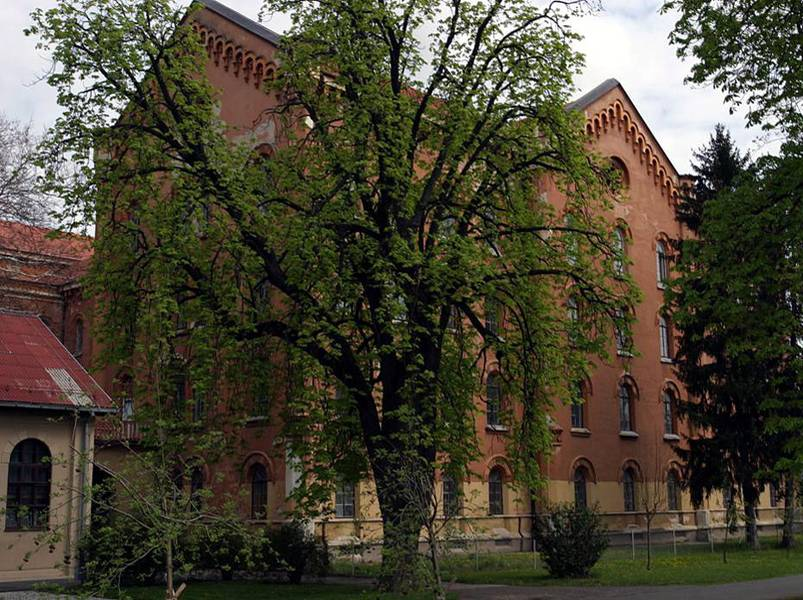
General Maister Barracks

General Maister Barracks (Slovene: Vojašnica generala Maistra) is a barracks of the Slovenian Armed Forces in Maribor, named after general Rudolf Maister.

It is the location of one of two Slovenian infantry brigades, the 72nd Brigade, and its subordinate units.

== Units ==
Current

- 72nd Brigade
- 37th vojaškoteritorialno Command Maribor
- 74th Infantry Regiment of the Slovenian Armed Forces
- 72nd Command-logistics company of the Slovenian Army
