= 1st Brigade (Slovenian Armed Forces) =

1st Brigade: 1. brigada
- Active: December 17, 1998 - current
- Country: Slovenia
- Allegiance: Slovenian Armed Forces
- Branch: Army
- Type: Infantry
- Role: Infantry warfare
- Size: Brigade
- Part of: Forces Command of the Slovenian Armed Forces
- Garrison/HQ: Edvard Peperko Barracks, Ljubljana
- Motto(s): MI SMO PRVI; WE ARE THE FIRST
- Anniversaries: 17 December

Commanders
- Current commander: Polkovnik Anton Tunja

1st Brigade (Slovene: 1. brigada) is one of two Infantry brigades of the Slovenian Armed Forces and provides combat forces. The other is the 72nd Brigade. The 1st Brigade is responsible for the defense of western Slovenia. The Brigade is under the Slovenian Army's General Staff.

== History ==
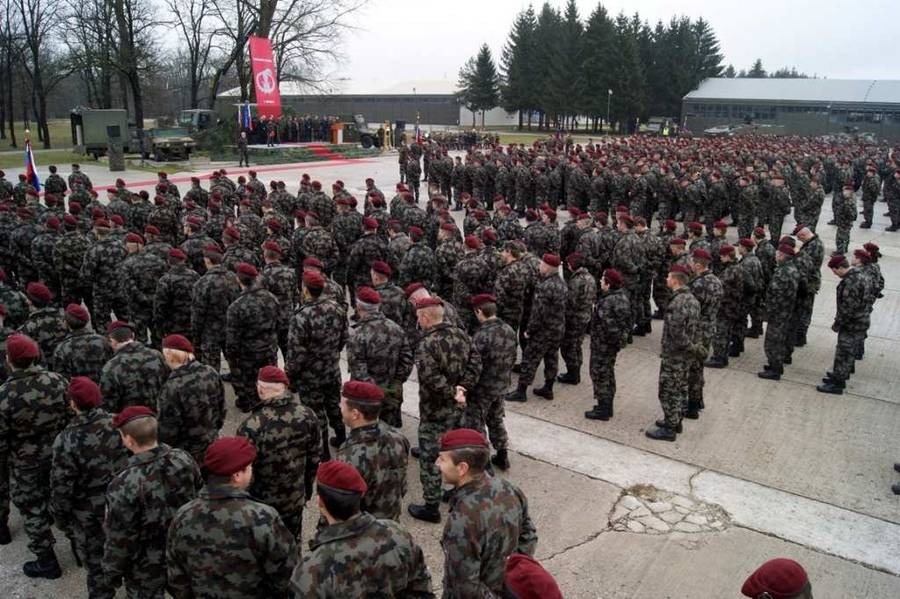
1st Brigade in 2011

It was formed on 17 December 1998.

== Organization ==
January 2004

- Command-Logistics Company
- 10th Motorized Battalion
- 20th Motorized Battalion
- 17th Military Police Battalion
- 670th Command-Logistics Battalion

July 2004

- Command
- 10th Motorized Battalion
- 20th Motorized Battalion
- 17th Military Police Battalion
- Detachment for Special Warfare

April 2008

- Command
- 10th Motorized Battalion
- 20th Motorized Battalion
- 74th Armoured-Mechanized Battalion
- 670th Command-Logistics Battalion

May 2008

- Command
- 10th Motorized Battalion
- 20th Motorized Battalion
- 74th Motorized Battalion
- 670th Command-Logistics Battalion

June 2013

- Command
- 10th Infantry Regiment
- 132nd Mountain Infantry Regiment
- Territorial Regiment
- Combat Support Battalion
  - Light Rocket Air Defense Battery
  - Fire Support Battery
  - Nuclear, Biological and Chemical Defense Company
  - Signals Company
  - Engineer Company
  - Anti-Tank Company
  - Intelligence and Reconnaissance Company
  - Military Police Company

February 2025

- 10th Infantry Regiment,
- 132nd Mountain Regiment,
- Territorial Regiment,
- Combat Support Battalion.
