= 72nd Brigade (Slovenian Armed Forces) =

72nd Brigade: 72. brigada
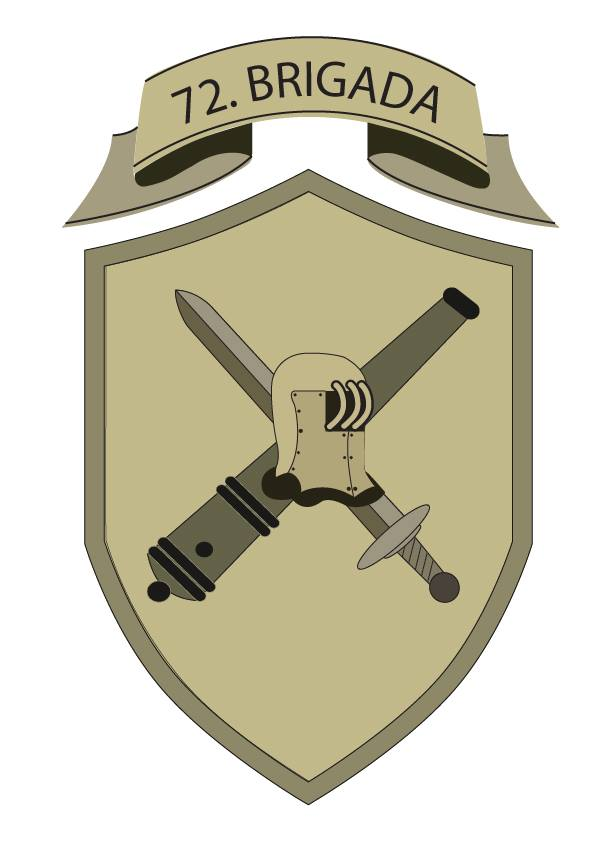
- Active: September 1992-current
- Country: Slovenia
- Allegiance: Slovenian Armed Forces
- Branch: Army
- Type: Infantry
- Role: Infantry warfare
- Size: Brigade
- Part of: Forces Command of the Slovenian Armed Forces
- Garrison/HQ: General Rudolf Maister Barracks, Maribor
- Motto: Viribus unitis - Skupaj zmoremo (we can do it united)
- Anniversaries: 23 November

Commanders
- Current commander: Colonel Gregor Hafner

72nd Brigade (Slovene: 72. brigada) is one of two Infantry brigades of Slovenian Armed Forces; the other one is 1st Brigade.

== Organization ==
July 2002

- Command
- 122nd Infantry Training Battalion
- 172nd Infantry Training Battalion
- 74th Armoured-Mechanized Battalion
- 76th Anti-Tank Battalion
- 760th Artillery Battalion
- 670th Logistical Base

May 2004

- Command
- Command-Logistical Company
- 122nd Infantry Training Battalion
- 172nd Infantry Training Battalion
- 132nd Mountain Battalion
- 74th Armoured-Mechanized Battalion
- 45th Armoured Battalion
- 460th Artillery Battalion
- 760th Artillery Battalion
- 18th Nuclear, Biological, Chemical Defense Battalion
- 76th Anti-Tank Battalion
- 670th Logistical Base

July 2004

- Command
- Command-Logistical Company
- 132nd Mountain Battalion
- 74th Armoured-Mechanized Battalion
- 45th Armoured Battalion
- 460th Artillery Battalion
- 76th Anti-Tank Battalion
- 18th Nuclear, Biological, Chemical Defense Battalion
- 14th Engineer Battalion

March 2008

- Command
- Command-Logistical Company
- 132nd Mountain Battalion
- 45th Armoured Battalion
- 460th Artillery Battalion
- 18th Nuclear, Biological, Chemical Defense Battalion
- 14th Engineer Battalion

June 2013

- Command
- 20th Infantry Regiment
- 74th Infantry Regiment
- Territorial Regiment
- Combat Support Battalion

- Light Rocket Air Defense Battery
- Engineer Company
- Nuclear, Biological, Chemical Defense Company
- Signals Company
- Military Police Company
- Intelligence and Reconnaissance Company
- Fire Support Battery (Artillery)
- Anti-Tank Company

== Commanders ==
- Colonel Venčeslav Ogrinc (1993–1997)
- Lieutenant Colonel Franc Ošljak (1997–2001)
- Lieutenant Colonel Jože Murko (2001–2003)
- Lieutenant Colonel Vladimir Maher (2003–2005)
- Lieutenant Colonel Friderik Škamlec (2005–2008)
- Lieutenant Colonel Ernest Anželj (2008–2010)
- Colonel Dušan Toš (2010–2013)
- Brigadier Franc Koračin (2013–2018)
- Colonel Uroš Paternus (2018–2018)
- Brigadier General Peter Zakrajšek (2018–2020)
- Brigadier General Boštjan Baš (2021–2023)
- Colonel Gregor Hafner (2023–2026)
- Colonel Boštjan Lesjak (2026–present)

== See also ==
- List of units of Slovenian Armed Forces
