= Slovenian Guards Unit =

Slovene Ceremonial unit

- Garda Slovenske vojske
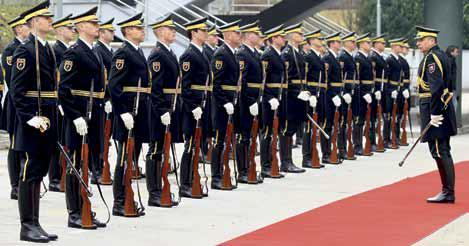
- Active: 1991; 35 years ago
- Country: Slovenia
- Allegiance: Slovenian Armed Forces
- Branch: Infantry
- Type: Honor Guard
- Role: Ceremonial Guard
- Size: one company
- Part of: Army Protocol Unit, General Staff
- Headquarters: Edvard Peperko Barracks, Celje
- Nickname: Guard of the Slovenian Armed Forces
- Equipment: M59 PAP

Insignia
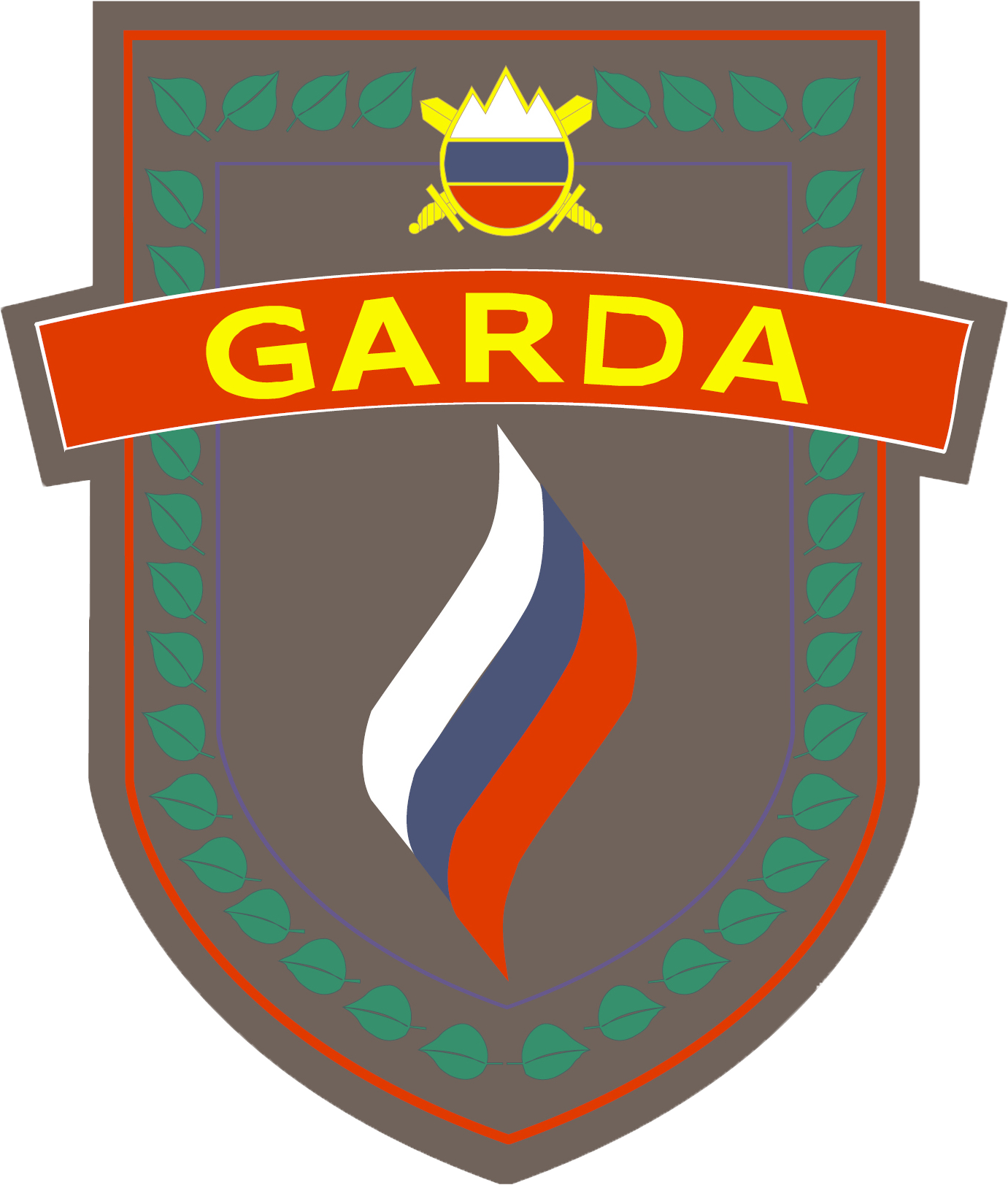
- Ceremonial Patch

The Slovenian Guards Unit is the official ceremonial honor guard unit of the Slovenian Army. Officially referred as the Guard of the Slovenian Armed Forces (Častna garda Slovenske vojske) by SV members, the guard is a unit of the SV, consisting of the General Staff of the Slovenian Armed Forces. The guard carries out many tasks of insuring that protocol in the SV is ensured.

It was established in 1991 from former ceremonial units in the Yugoslav People's Army. The guard is intended to be present at all events at state and ministerial level, in units and commands of the SAF and local communities at home and abroad. Within the framework of its tasks, it is responsible for carrying out all types of military and military protocol, among which are:

- Provide military honors for high-ranking guests of the country (heads of state, heads of government, defense ministers, army chiefs and other military officials) in state arrival ceremonies
- Take part in the execution of funeral honors for fallen soldiers and serve as pallbearers during state funerals
- Performing synchronized drill routines
- Provide ceremonial security to the commander in chief

== The guard at the President's Office ==
Since June 25, 2013 (Statehood Day), the unit has posted guards at the Government Building and President's Office on public holidays from 8 AM - 6 PM. This was instituted by order President Borut Pahor who explained the decision in the following words:

From the first day I have been thinking in the capacity of the President of the Republic in the direction of full regeneration of civic awareness and belonging, which is missing. Even when it comes to purely practical action in the crisis, it is a sense of self-confidence, belonging to the community, I think that we missed it during the transition, it was lost when we ran away for other goods, but now it seems to be very important. For our self-esteem and for dealing with the circumstances in which we find ourselves.

== Uniform ==
The guard has its own distinct uniform which is separate from the rest of the uniforms of the SV. The uniform is worn by members guard during protocol tasks and in accordance with the Rules on Service in the Slovenian Armed Forces and the Rules on Protocol. The uniform color consists of a green and blue and includes a jacket, trousers with a belt, and a cap/beret, a shirt and tie under a jacket, brown leather boots, and white gloves and socks. The belt and shoulder cords of the unit are golden yellow.

== Arms ==
- 3x protocol Zastava Arms 76 mm mountain gun M48
- Zastava M59/66 semi-automatic rifle
- Zastava M70 assault rifle

== Gallery ==
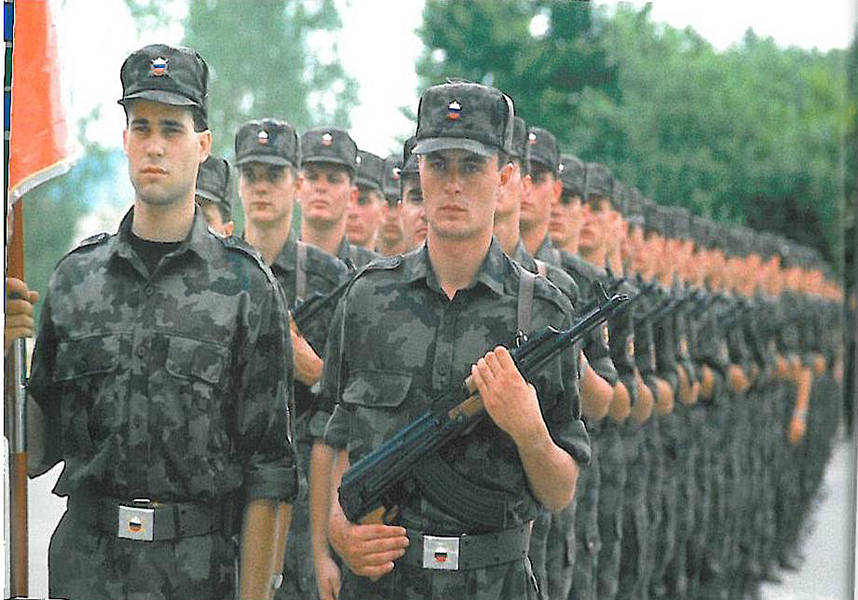
The guard in 1991

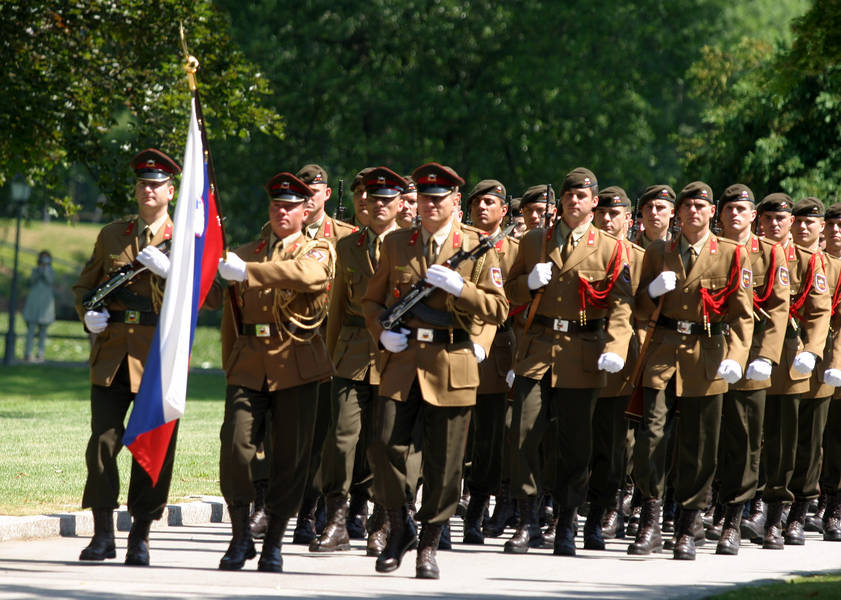
Brown uniforms in 2004

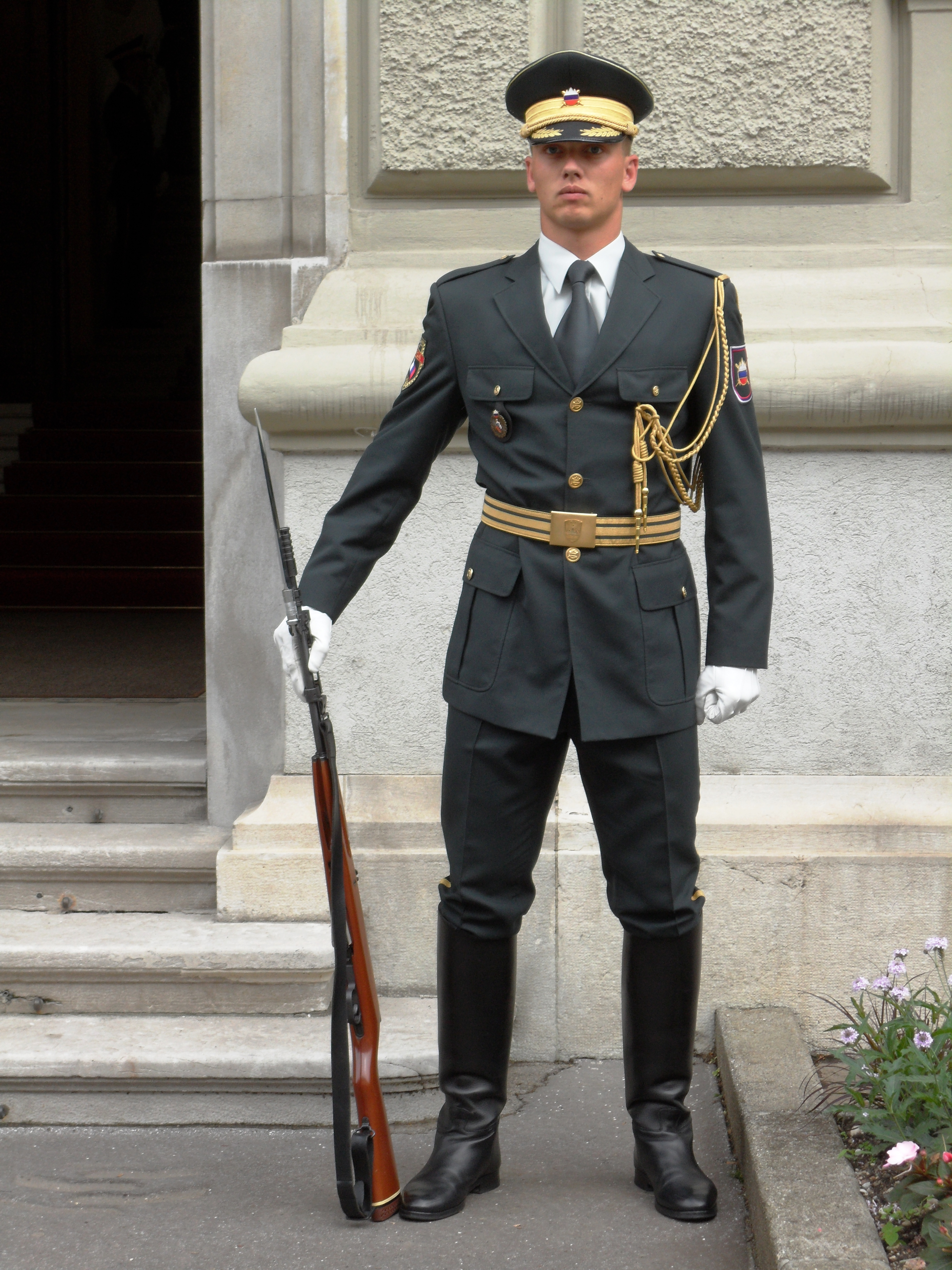
Guard at Government and Presidential palace in Ljubljana
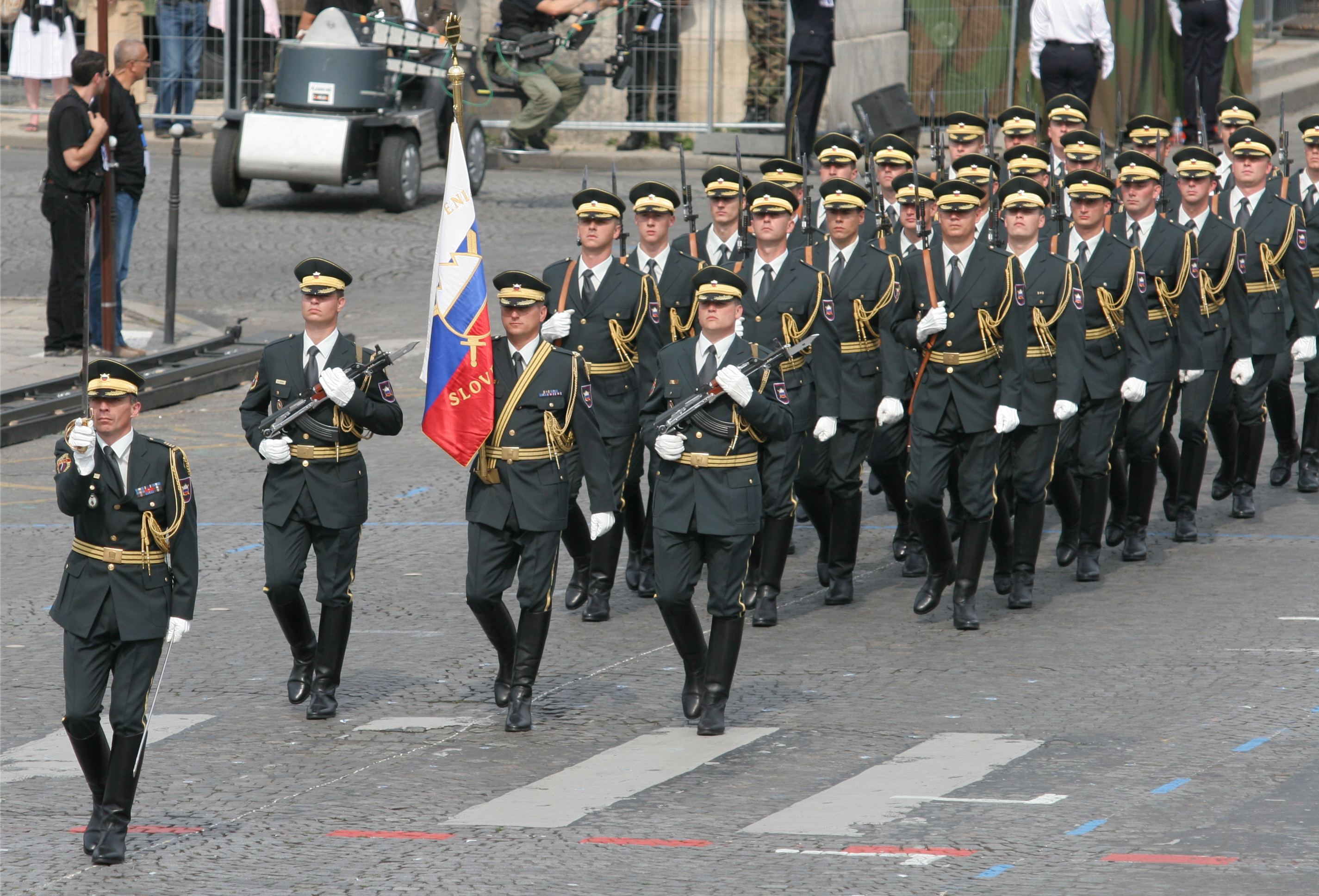
At the Bastille Day military parade

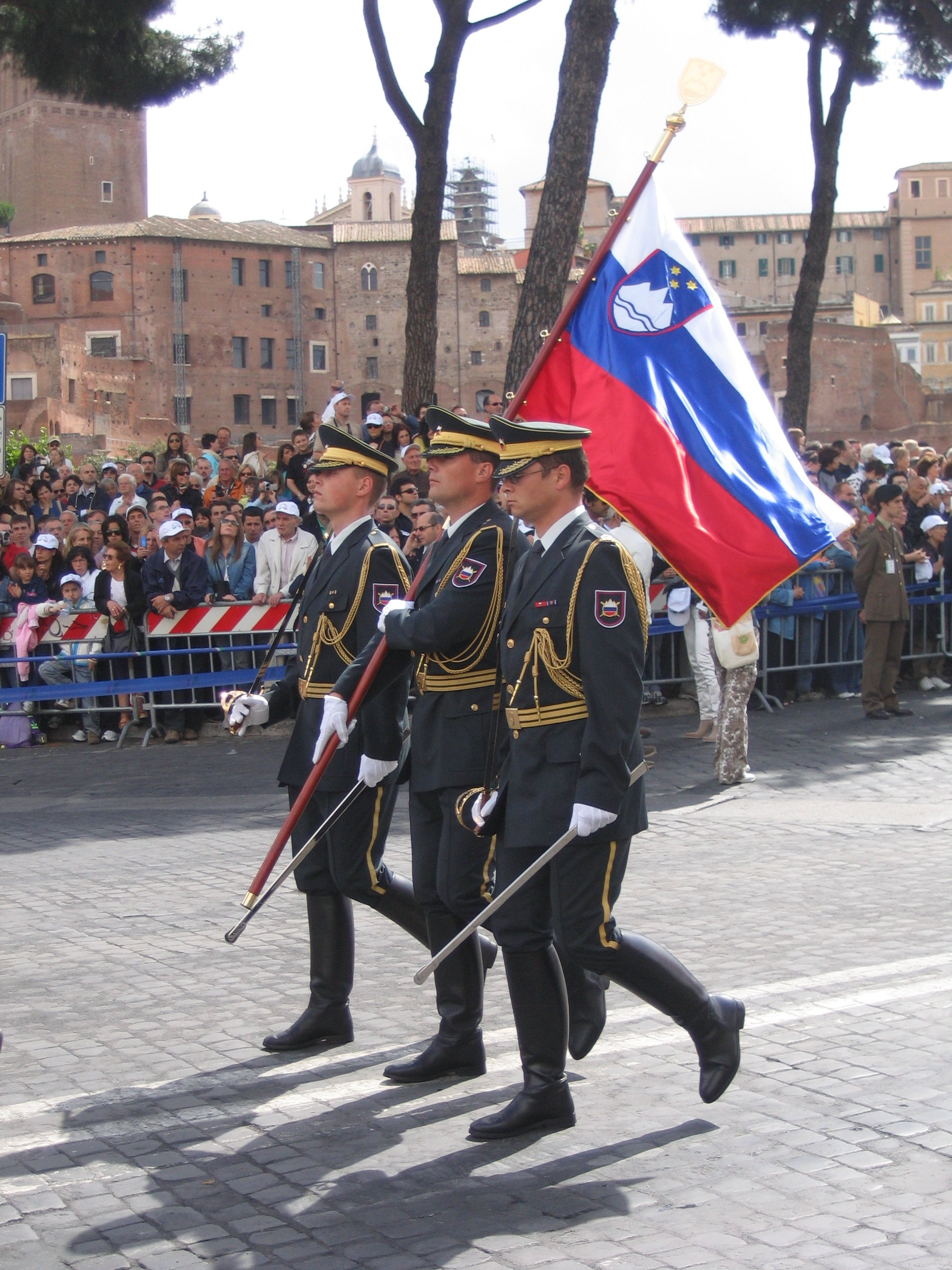
At a Festa della Repubblica parade in Rome

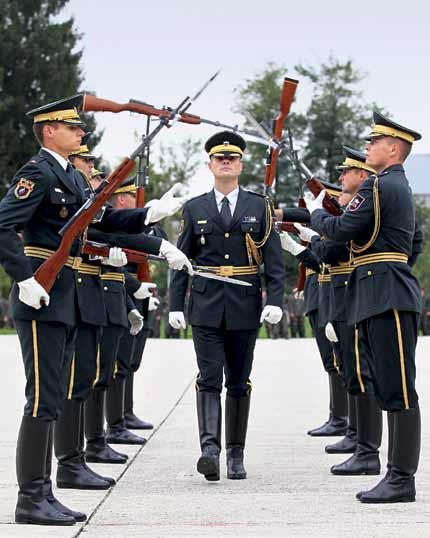
The Drill Team

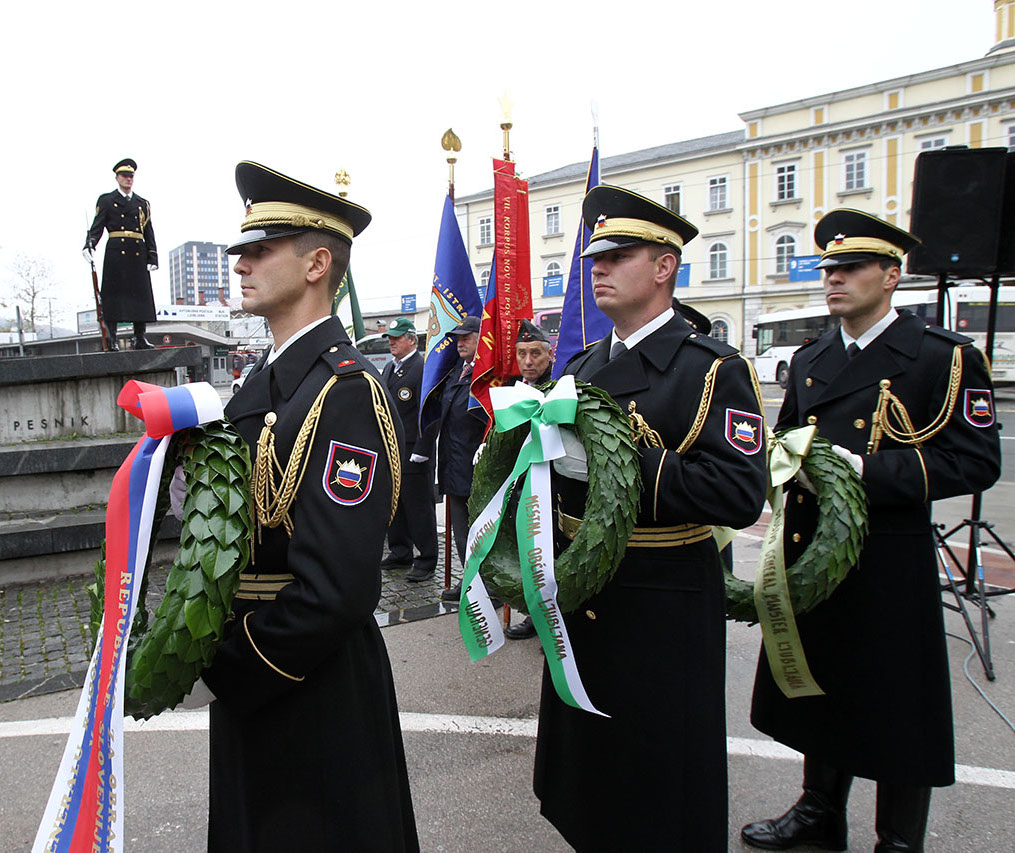
Wreath Laying Group
