= Valuk =

LKOV Valuk
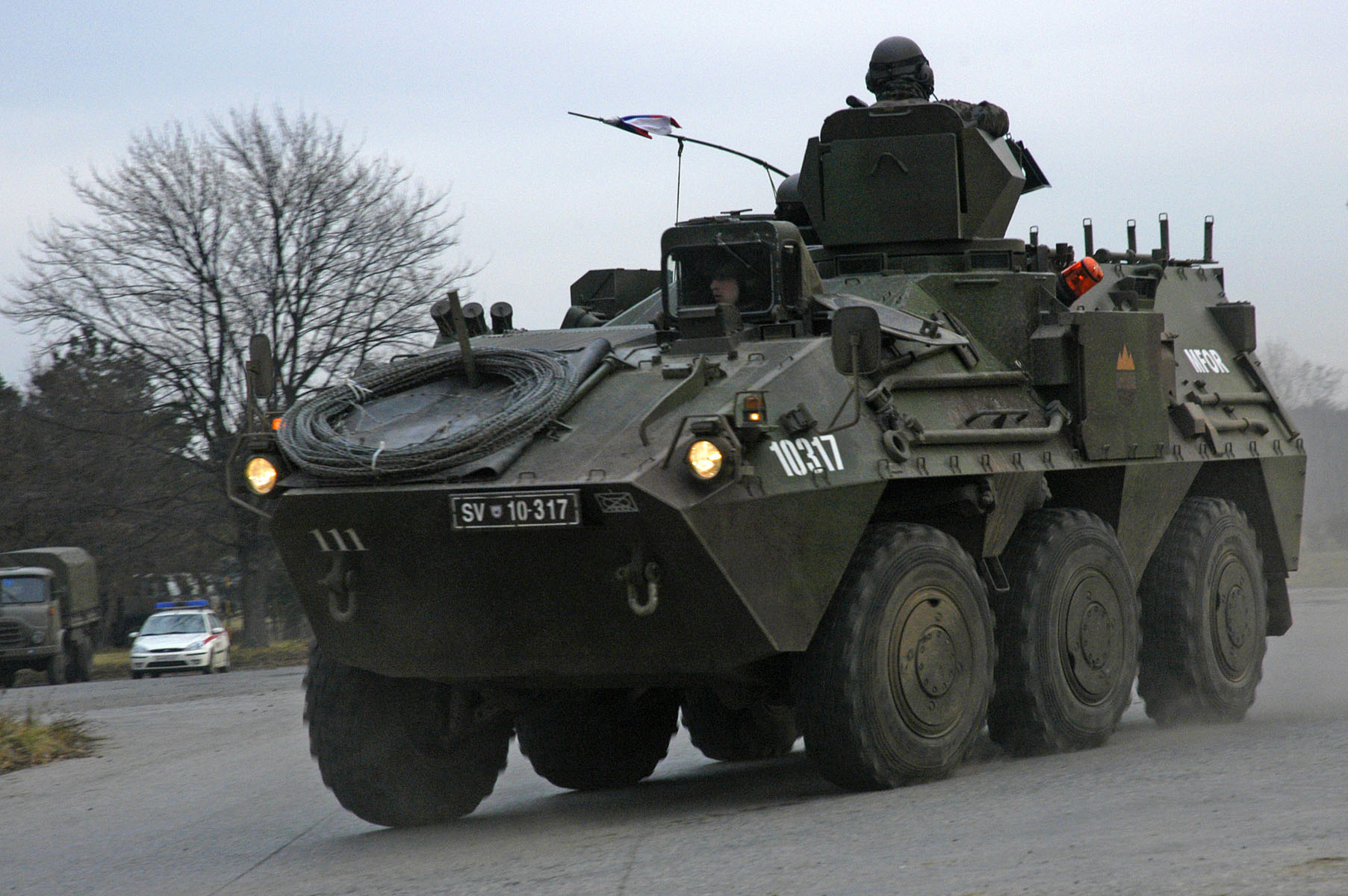
- Valuk
- Type: Armoured personnel carrier
- Place of origin: Slovenia

Service history
- Used by: See Operators
- Wars: War in Afghanistan; Russian Invasion of Ukraine

Production history
- Manufacturer: Sistemska Tehnika
- Variants: 4

Specifications
- Mass: 12.3 tonnes; max 13.5 tonnes
- Length: 5.7 m (19 ft)
- Width: 2.5 m (8.2 ft)
- Height: 2 m (6.6 ft)
- Crew: 2-3 depends on version
- Passengers: 2-6 depends on version
- Armor: protection against 7.62mm rounds everywhere else
- Main armament: 12.7 mm MG (other options available)
- Engine: Steyr WD 612.95, 6-cylinder turbo-charged diesel 191 kW (256 bhp) at 2400 rpm
- Power/weight: 20.4 hp/t
- Suspension: 6×6 wheeled
- Ground clearance: 430 mm (17 in)
- Fuel capacity: 247 L (65 US gal)
- Operational range: 700 km (430 mi)
- Maximum speed: 100 km/h (62 mph)

Lahko kolesno oklepno vozilo Valuk (LKOV, "Light wheeled armoured vehicle") is an improved version of Pandur 6X6 APC (armored personnel carrier), manufactured under a license manufacturing agreement with the Austrian company, Steyr Daimler Puch Spezialfahrzeug AG & Co KG (now part of General Dynamics Land Systems – Europe), by Sistemska Tehnika of Slovenia for the Slovenian Army.

It is named after the Carantanian duke Valuk.

== Design ==
=== Weapon systems ===
The transport version is equipped with either a 12.7 mm machine gun or a 40 mm automatic grenade launcher. The mortar-carrier version carries a CARDOM 120 mm mortar.

The scout version is equipped with a stabilised Overhead Weapon Station supplied by the Rafael Israel Armament Development Authority. The Overhead Weapon Station OWS-25 is armed with a 25 mm Bushmaster automatic cannon and a 7.62 mm coaxial machine gun. The weapon station can be fitted with externally mounted TOW long-range anti-tank guided missiles.

=== Command, control, and targeting systems ===
The gunner can survey, acquire and track a target, aim and fire from inside the turret with a closed hatch, or in a head-out position. The gunner's station is equipped with a day and night periscope sight. The day periscope sight has a unity magnification window with a collimated aiming circle and an 8× magnification sight with a ballistic reticle. The night periscope sight has a unity magnification window and an image intensifier x7.5 magnification passive night elbow.

The main components of the observation system are:

- Doppler radar (optional; 48 km of max detection radius)
- Electro-optical subsystems: CCD camera (effective distance up to 20 km), FLIR and laser distance measurer
- LTD (laser target designator)
- GPS
- BMS (battle management system)
- UHF/VHF radio station
- Integrated electric generator (optional)

=== Self-protection ===
The standard armoured protection is rated to withstand 7.62 mm armour-piercing rounds through a full 360 degrees, and 12.7 mm armour-piercing rounds over a 30-degree frontal arc.

Rafael has supplied a passive add-on ceramic armour kit for the Valuk, which provides 12.7 mm AP round protection over the full 360 degrees.

The crew door at the rear of the vehicle is equipped with a periscope sight. The crew is protected against anti-tank and anti-personnel mines and a full nuclear, biological and chemical warfare protection system is fitted. The crew compartment is fitted with an automatic fire detection and fire fighting system, with 3 fire sensors and three Halon 1301 gas containers.

A version of the Valuk has been built with a rear ramp with an emergency door instead of two doors. The vehicle can be equipped with a capstan type cable winch.

=== Engine ===
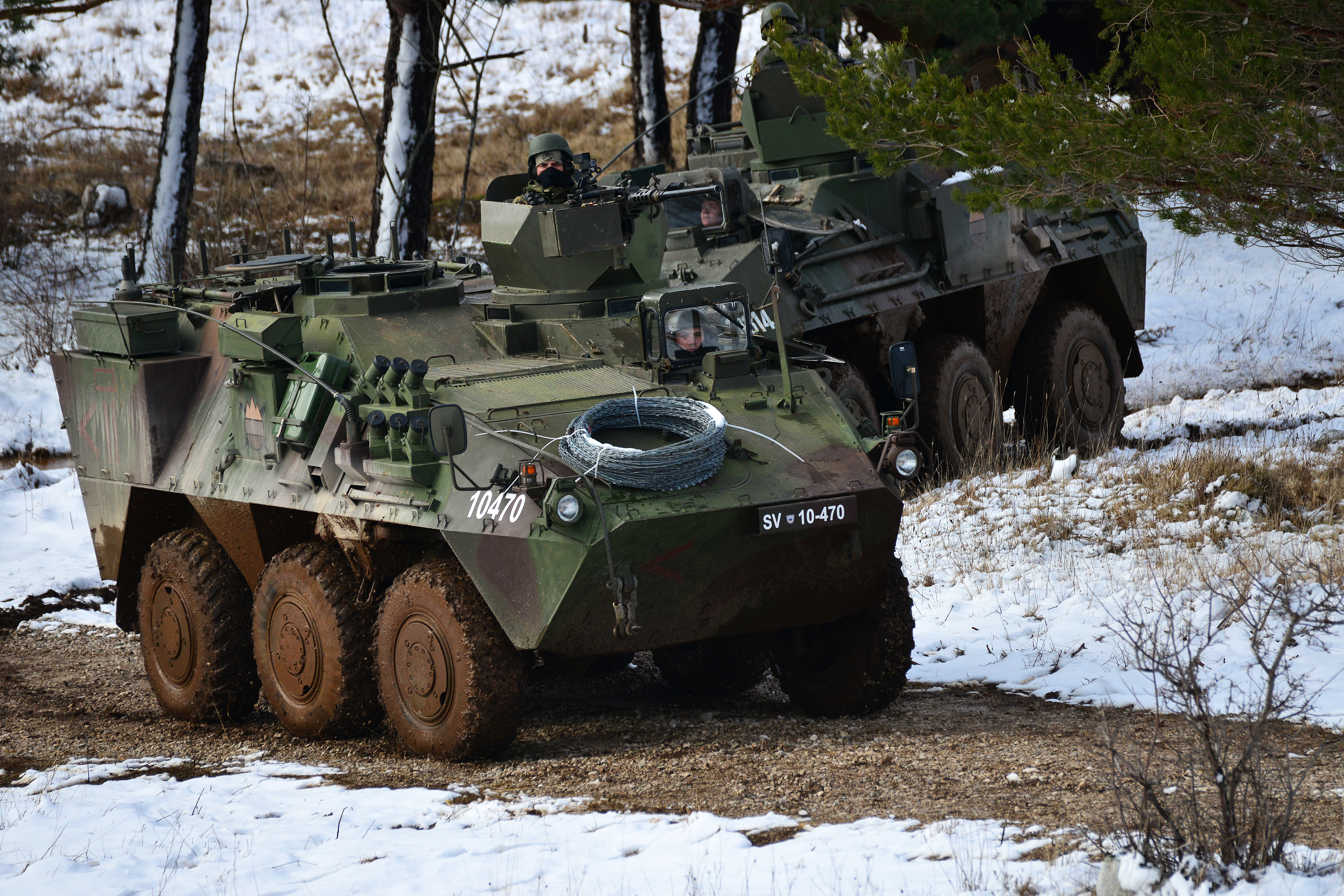
Slovenian Valuks on an exercise

The Valuk has a Steyr 612.35 6-cylinder turbo diesel engine. It has a hydrodynamically controlled automatic transmission with a torque converter, and a lock-up clutch with 5 forward and 1 reverse gears. The engine provides a power-to-weight ratio of 20.4 kW per ton.

The 6x6 wheels have automatic tyre pressure regulation, with a central tyre inflation system. The independent suspension system has telescopic shock absorbers on each wheel. There are coil springs on the first and second axle and torsion bars on the third axle.

The drive train and steering linkages are protected within the hull of the vehicle.

=== Mobility ===
The turning radius is 8.5 metres and the maximum speed is typically 100 kilometres per hour. The ground clearance is 430 mm. The vehicle can negotiate natural and man made obstacles such as trenches up to 1.5 metres wide, vertical obstacles to 0.5 metres high, gradients of 70 per cent and side slopes to 40 per cent. The Valuk can ford water to a depth of 1.2 metres. The combat weight is 13,300 kilograms.

== Versions ==
As with most modern infantry fighting vehicles, a number of versions and roles are available:

- Transport version
  - Crew: 3+6
  - Armaments: 12.7 mm machine gun or 40 mm automatic grenade launcher
- Ambulance version
  - Crew: 3+4/(2+3)/6
  - Armaments: none
- Mortar-carrier version
  - Crew: 2+2
  - Armaments: CARDOM 120 mm mortar
  - Made as a prototype, never adopted.
- Scout version
  - Crew: 3
  - Armaments: 25 mm M242 Bushmaster automatic cannon and a 7.62 mm coaxial machine gun, fitted using a RAFAEL Rafael Overhead Weapon Station (OWS-25).
  - Made as a prototype, never adopted.

== Operators ==
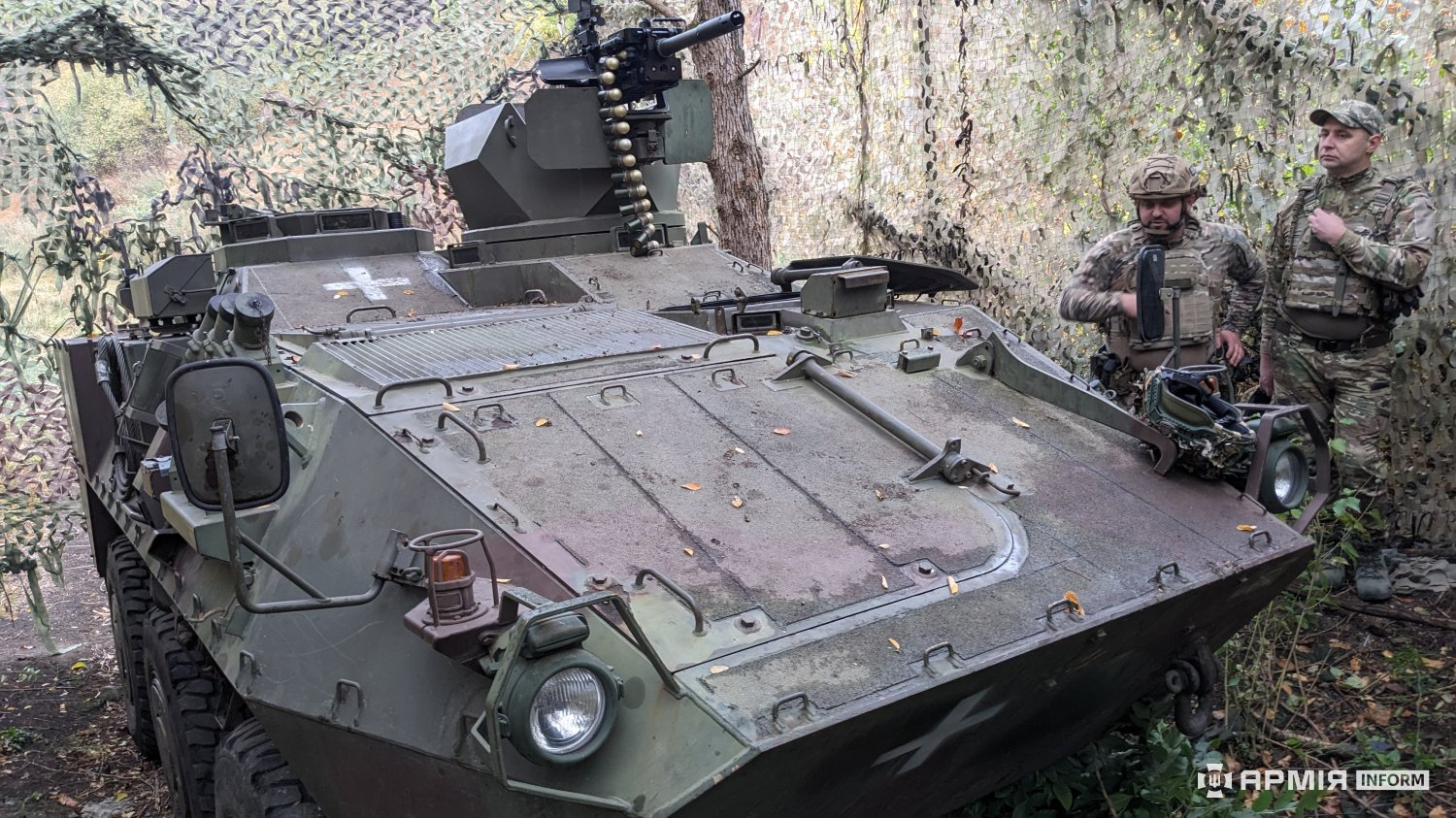
- Valuk under service of the Ukrainian 44th Mechanized Brigade
  Slovenia – 65 Vehicles
- Ukraine – 20 Vehicles (donated in April 2023)
