= Sovereignty Day (Slovenia) =

- Official name: dan suverenosti
- Observed by: Slovenia
- Significance: Last Yugoslav People's Army soldier left Slovenia in 1991
- Date: 25 October
- Next time: 25 October 2026
- Frequency: annual
- First time: 2015

Sovereignty Day (Slovene: dan suverenosti) is a public holiday in Slovenia, celebrated on 25 October. It commemorates one of the key events in the process of attaining independence, namely withdrawal of the last Yugoslav People's Army (JNA) soldier from the territory of present-day Slovenia. It is a designated state holiday, but not a work-free day.

== Background ==
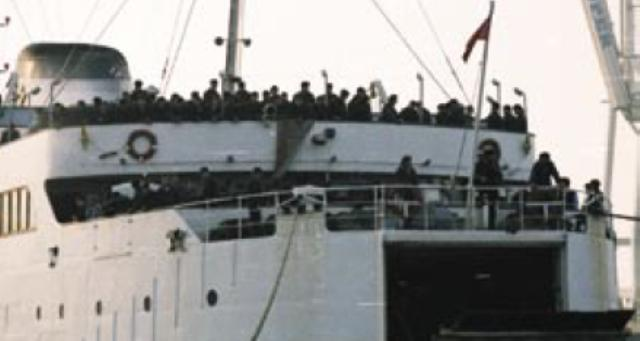
Last Yugoslav army troops leaving Slovenian soil by sea

The Ten-Day War, a civil war, started in the former Yugoslavia on 27 June 1991 between the Yugoslav army and the Slovenian Territorial Defence, ending on 7 July with Slovenia's decisive victory and Slovenia becoming independent. In the Brioni Agreement signed by both parties, Slovenia agreed to postpone its independence by three months and the Yugoslav military was allowed to leave Slovenian territory in stages, with a deadline of the end of October. The last Yugoslav army soldier left around midnight of 25 October 1991, the day now declared as "Sovereignty Day".

=== Date issue ===
The key event, the departure of the ship with the last remaining JNA soldiers from the Port of Koper, actually happened on the night of 25 October 1991. Therefore, some consider 26 October to be the real anniversary. However, the last two ships that were still moored in the port at midnight were flying foreign flags, and thus constituted foreign territory according to admiralty law. All the troops on board therefore left the Slovene territory as soon as they boarded – which was before midnight.

== History ==
The bill was sponsored by a member of the ruling Modern Centre Party on the initiative of two veterans' societies, and was enacted with a large majority of 70 to 4 by the National Assembly on 9 March 2015. Regarding celebrations, Marjan Dolinšek, a member of the Modern Centre Party, said, "The new holiday would be celebrated as day of pride, unity and confidence in memory of what preserved the nation through centuries".

No official state celebration was organized on the first Sovereignty Day on 25 October 2015, nor is one planned for future years. An open day was organized by the president's office, with the president Borut Pahor making a speech on this occasion. Apart from that, commemorations took place on the municipal level, most notably in Kamnik, where the two veterans' societies unveiled a monument to the actions by members of Slovenian Territorial Defence and police force during the Ten-Day War.
