= Edvard Peperko Barracks =

Barracks in Ljubljana, Slovenia

Coordinates: 46°3′53.14″N 14°33′29.07″E

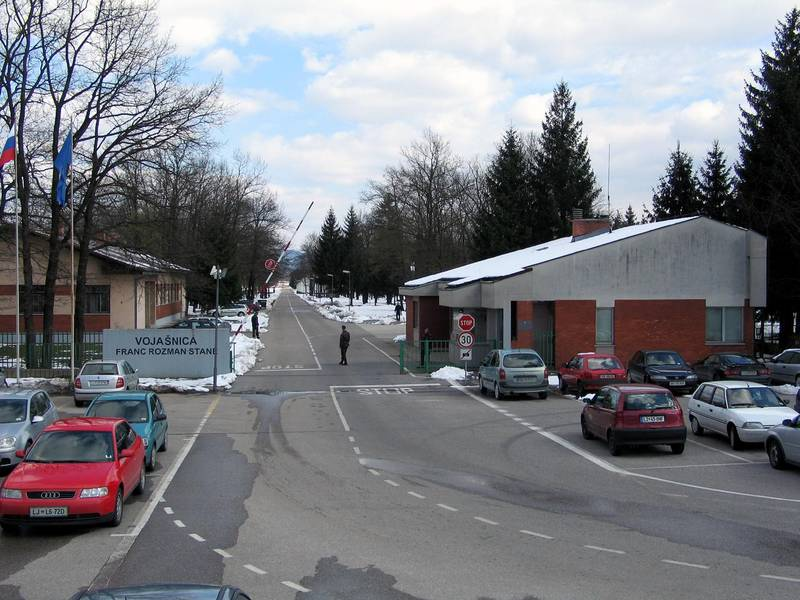
Entrance to the Edvard Peperko Barracks

The Edvard Peperko Barracks (Slovene: Vojašnica Edvarda Peperka), until July 2012 known as the Franc "Stane" Rozman Barracks (Vojašnica Franca Rozmana – Staneta), are barracks in Ljubljana, the capital of Slovenia. They are the home of the Slovenian Armed Forces. Before the Slovenia's independence, they belonged to the Yugoslav People's Army. They were built in 1975 at the site of the former Ljubljana airport.

== Name ==
Originally, the barracks were named the Brotherhood and Unity Barracks (Slovene: Vojašnica bratstva in enotnosti). Later, they were renamed after the Slovene Partisan commander and Yugoslav people's hero Franc Rozman, a.k.a. Stane. In July 2012, they were renamed after Edvard Peperko (1966–1991), who was among the first Slovenes to die in the Ten-Day War in 1991. The renaming was ordered in June 2012 by Aleš Hojs, the Slovenian Minister of Defence. It was opposed by the Partisan veteran organization, opposition parties, and one of the coalition parties.

== Units ==
=== Currently ===
- 1st Brigade
- 10 motorized battalion of the Slovenian Armed Forces
- 17 Military Police Battalion, the Slovenian Armed Forces
- Technical Institute Slovenian Armed Forces
- Guard of the Slovenian Armed Forces

=== Former ===
- 12th Guards Battalion of the Slovenian Armed Forces
