= Anton Kikaš =

Croatian-Canadian businessman (born 1941)

- Born: Anton ("Tony") Kikaš; 1941 (age 84–85); Bijakovići, Bosnia-Hercegovina
- Education: Faculty of Geodesy, University of Zagreb
- Occupation: Business man
- Known for: airplane adventure

Anton Kikaš (born 1941) is a Croatian-Canadian business man.

== Early life ==
Kikaš was born in 1941 to ethnic Croatian parents in Bijakovići in Hercegovina, and spent his early life in Kakanj and Sarajevo. After graduating from the Faculty of Geodesy, University of Zagreb, he subsequently emigrated to Canada in 1968. In Canada he became active in the Croat community there, and in 1987 was involved in the establishment of the department of Croatian language and literature at the University of Waterloo.

Kikaš was also involved in business in Morocco, Trinidad, and Saudi Arabia, and had arranged football matches in Los Angeles.

== Croatian war of independence ==
In 1990 Kikaš was told by Alija Izetbegović during a visit by Izetbegović to Toronto that "The sooner you Croats understand, the better it will be for you, that we Muslims have never been and will never be a part of the Croatian people." When Franjo Tuđman visited Toronto in September 1990, he passed this message on to him.

At the beginning of the Croatian war of independence he raised money from the Croatian émigré community in Canada and, with the agreement of the Croatian Ministry of the Interior, used it to purchase arms in South Africa. He hired a Uganda Airlines Boeing 707 to ship these arms, with the plan that they would file a flight-plan to fly to Trieste, Italy and then attempt to land and unload the plane's cargo of small-arms and anti-armour weapons in Ljubljana, capital of Slovenia, which at this point had already effectively achieved de facto (but not de jure) independence from Yugoslavia after the Ten Day war. From Slovenia the arms were to be shipped to the Croatian police and National Guard. The shipment was valued at $1 million, weighed 18 tonnes, and included Singaporean SAR 80 assault rifles and ammunition. Kikaš was the only passenger on the flight, which had a crew of six.

As they approached their destination, the pilot of the aeroplane mistakenly informed Yugoslav air controllers that they were bound for Ljubljana, not Trieste. Suspicious, and since the aircraft was now headed for what was officially Yugoslav airspace, the Yugoslav authorities scrambled two Yugoslav airforce MiG 21 jets to intercept Kikaš's 707 and forced it to land at Zagreb airport.

Zagreb airport was the scene of fighting between the JNA and the Croatian police and was only partly controlled by the JNA, though the JNA successfully seized control of the aircraft upon landing. Croatian forces had attacked the control tower and blocked roads in and out of the airport. The aircraft and its contents were seized by the Yugoslavs, and Kikaš was arrested and sent to a military prison in Belgrade for interrogation after receiving a beating at the airport. After three months in prison, Kikaš was released as part of a group of 27 pro-Croat figures exchanged for 28 JNA officers including Milan Aksentijević, a Serb JNA officer captured by Croatian forces. The exchange took place on 25 November 1991 at Pleso Airport near Zagreb. In October 1991 Ugandan president Yoweri Museveni refused repatriation of the Uganda Airlines crew, calling them "mercenaries".

== "Kikaš" the aeroplane ==
Kikaš
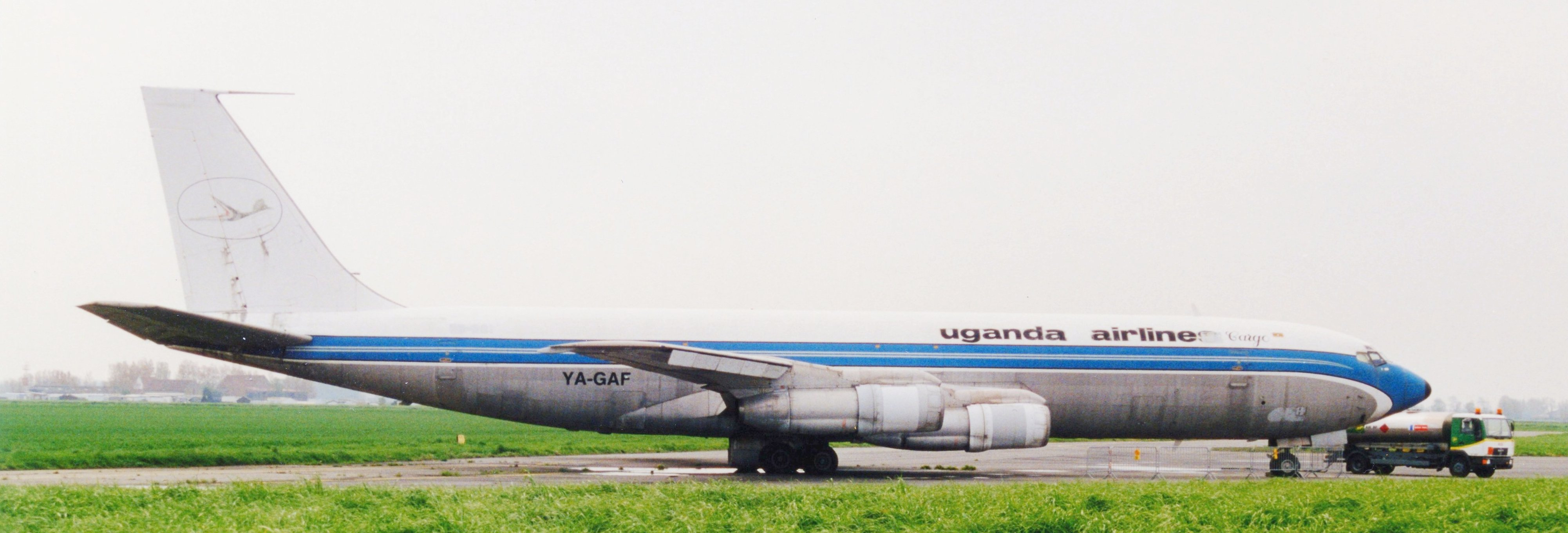
- "Kikaš" in 2001, at the Ostend Airport

General information
- Type: Boeing 707-328C
- Manufacturer: Boeing
- Construction number: 19177/513
- Registration: 5X-UCM

History
- In service: 1966–2004
- Fate: Scrapped in 2004

The Ugandan Airlines Boeing 707-328C, registration number 5X-UCM, named "Kikaš" by the Serbs, was subsequently used by them in military operations in both Croatia and Bosnia, beginning with their withdrawal from Zagreb airport under attack from the Croatian military (who they called "Zengas"). "Kikaš" was piloted out of Zagreb to Belgrade by JAT aircrew who had last flown a 707 ten years before and who flew into the airport aboard an Antonov transport and flew out aboard "Kikaš", directly over the Croatian "Zengas". "Kikaš" was subsequently used during the evacuation of the families of JNA personnel and other civilians from Bihać and Sarajevo, as well as the transport of military equipment, and was piloted by Stevan Popov.

A total of 49,000 refugees were evacuated from Sarajevo aboard "Kikaš" only between 12 April and 3 May 1992 by Stevan Popov and other aircrew.

At the time, the management of JAT was prepared to register the "Boeing 707" for civil aviation, but they were unable to obtain complete technical data for the aircraft; consequently, in 1996, they sold it to a British-American company. JAT tried to register "Kikaš" for civilian use, but lacking technical data on the aircraft, were unsuccessful. The aircraft was subsequently sold to Afghanistan's Balkh Airlines in 1997.

== Subsequent life ==
At the time of his arrest at Zagreb airport, Kikaš was a divorcee. Kikaš met his second wife, with whom he had two sons, shortly after being released. He now lives in Canada but regularly visits Croatia. A film entitled Nisam se bojao umrijeti ("I Am Not Afraid To Die") and directed by Jakov Sedlar was released in 2016 about his exploits. As of 2025, Kikaš had been running Croatian television in Toronto for about 12 years.

In 2021, Croatian president Zoran Milanović conferred the Order of Duke Domagoj with Ribbon for the bravery and heroism on Kikaš for his role in the Croatian war of independence, stating that "You are getting the decoration you should have received long ago. It is a great honour for me that such actions are recorded and not forgotten". The award was granted on the 30th anniversary of Kikaš's release from prison.
