= Plodršnica =

- Location in Slovenia
- Coordinates: 46°38′34.55″N 15°45′59.62″E
- Country: Slovenia
- Traditional region: Styria
- Statistical region: Drava
- Municipality: Šentilj

Area
  - Total: 1.08 km^{2} (0.42 sq mi)
- Elevation: 302 m (991 ft)

Population (2002)
  - Total: 108

Plodršnica (pronounced [ˈploːdəɾʃnitsa], in older sources also Ploderšnica, German: Ploderberg) is a small settlement in the Slovene Hills (Slovene: Slovenske gorice) southeast of Šentilj v Slovenskih Goricah in the Municipality of Šentilj in northeastern Slovenia.
