= Zgornje Dobrenje =

- Location in Slovenia
- Coordinates: 46°38′50.32″N 15°38′46.65″E
- Country: Slovenia
- Traditional region: Styria
- Statistical region: Drava
- Municipality: Šentilj

Area
  - Total: 1.83 km^{2} (0.71 sq mi)
- Elevation: 311 m (1,020 ft)

Population (2002)
  - Total: 75

Zgornje Dobrenje (pronounced [ˈzɡoːɾnjɛ dɔˈbɾeːnjɛ]) is a dispersed settlement in the Slovene Hills (Slovene: Slovenske gorice) south of Šentilj v Slovenskih Goricah in the Municipality of Šentilj in northeastern Slovenia.
