= Oton Kučera =

Croatian astronomer (1857–1931)

- Born: 31 December 1856; Petrinja, Croatian Military Frontier, Austrian Empire
- Died: 29 December 1931 (aged 74); Zagreb, Sava Banovina, Kingdom of Yugoslavia
- Education: University of Vienna
- Scientific career
- Fields: Astronomy, physics
- Workplaces: Matica hrvatska Zagreb Observatory

Oton Kučera (1 January 1857 – 29 December 1931) was a Croatian astronomer. He played a crucial role by popularizing science and technology in Croatia. He was also the president of Matica hrvatska and the author of several physics handbooks for primary school and a series of popular scientific works from the areas of physics, astronomy and electrical engineering.

== Youth ==
He was born in Petrinja as the first of thirteen children of Ida Bošnjaković and Franjo Kučera, a teacher. His son Vlaho later claimed that Oton was born on 31 December 1856, but that pragmatic reasons (such as the army service) prompted his parents to move the date by one day. Oton celebrated his birthday on 1 January as shown by the celebration of his 70th birthday in 1927. Through his paternal grandfather Václav Kučera, who moved from Staré Hamry to Glina, Oton was of Czech descent.

Oton's father was soon transferred, so the family left Petrinja and settled in Otočac, where Oton spent his childhood and completed five years of primary school. He attended the secondary school in Senj. Traveling over the mountain range of Velebit to reach Senj from Otočac, the young man discovered his love and interest for mountains and the starry sky. He continued his studies in Vinkovci, where he completed his secondary education in 1873.

As an excellent and talented student, Oton was given the Military Frontier grant. He went to Vienna, where he studied physics, mathematics and astronomy, attending the lectures of the famous scientists Jožef Stefan, Ludwig Boltzmann and Johann Josef Loschmidt. He also went to the Vienna Observatory, which was managed by Karl L. Littrow.

He was offered the post of the assistant, but patriotic and family reasons brought him back to Vinkovci, where he started lecturing at the local Gymnasium at the age of 19. Two years later he passed the required teacher exam in Vienna.

== Early works ==
In 1881 he published his first scientific works. Together with Spiridon Brusina and Gjuro Pilar, he founded the Croatian Society of Natural Sciences in Zagreb in late 1885. He was still a teacher in Vinkovci. The Society published its Glasnik (Herald), where Kučera's first article, Man and Natural Science, can be found in 1886. It described the development of natural sciences.

Having moved to Požega, Kučera started popularizing science, which he would do until his death. He founded the first observatory in Požega. In 1892, his first book of popular science was printed, Notes on Magnetism and Electricity.

Popular science flourished in the 19th century Croatia, especially because the Croatian language became prominent in local science. Kučera played a crucial role in popularizing science. He is popularly called the "Croatian Flammarion" after his famous French counterpart.

Kučera believed that man has the same relationship towards the stars as towards his homeland, and that astronomy makes people think about the fundamental questions of life and forget the low passions, which endows it with great educational value.

== The peak of his career ==
When Kučera moved to Zagreb in 1892, it was the start of his most prolific period. He taught at the Realna Gymnasium, where he created the first modern lecture room for physics in 1893. In the same year, he published another book, Weather: Notes on Meteorology. In 1895, he wrote Our Sky, a book of popular astronomy published by Matica hrvatska in a printing run of 12,000 copies. It was received enthusiastically and printed two more times during his life (1921, 1930). It earned him the award of the foundation of the count Ivan Nepomuk Drašković. In 1995, a hundred years after it was first published, the book had its fourth edition in Zagreb.

In 1899, Kučera wrote Physics for Beginners, a textbook with an appendix of astronomy and chemistry. He got his Ph.D. from the University of Zagreb with a work on Marin Getaldić and became a lecturer of higher mathematics, theoretical physics and mechanics at the Academy of Forestry in Zagreb, where he stayed until retirement in 1915. At the Academy, he introduced a two-year course of geodesy, which he managed during the first year. That course would later evolve into the Faculty of Geodesy, University of Zagreb.

In 1902, Kučera published Experimental Physics for Secondary Schools and initiated the astronomy section at the Croatian Society of Natural Sciences. Still lecturing at the academy, he accepted the position of the head of the Zagreb Observatory, created in 1903, which he had helped found. The astronomy section and the observatory were a great success, since they boosted the membership in the Society from 95 to 230. In 1924, Kučera became a member of the French Astronomical Society in Paris.

His book Waves and Rays was published in 1903. In 1907 he translated two textbooks, Scheiner's Structure of Space and Walentin's Advanced Physics for Secondary School. Kučera was active in many other areas: he was the president of the first radio club, a member of the literary committee of Matica hrvatska, and the president of Matica from 1909 to 1917. From 1908 to 1911, he was the president of the Secondary School Teacher Society. He was a regular and popular lecturer at the Open University of Zagreb. Kučera was an editor of the Herald of the Croatian Mountaineering Society since its first issue. From 1892 to 1913 he was the secretary and then president of the Croatian Mountaineering Society. He was also a member of the Brethren of the Croatian Dragon, with the honorific title "Dragon of Petrinja", and a working member of the Croatian Literary Society of St. Jerome.

== Later life and family ==
Kučera went into retirement in 1915. In 1920, after the fall of Austria-Hungary, he returned to work, becoming the government officer for secondary schools. He managed the Zagreb Observatory again from 1920 to 1925, when he went into retirement for the second time. From 1924 to 1926, he was the editor of Bošković, an astronomical calendar.

Among many books he published in later life, the most important were published in the series of Modern Age Inventions: Movement and Forces. Notes on the Mechanics of Sky and Earth (1915) and Wireless Telegraph and Telephone (1925).

His daughter from his first marriage, Elza, became a renowned psychologist. When his first wife Vilma Stenzl died, he remarried with Jelka Sakač and had three more children: daughters Mara and Nevenka and son Vlaho. In the last years of his life, family reasons made him sell the family house at Jurjevska Street 14 in Zagreb and move to a rented apartment in Mallinova Street. He died in Zagreb and was buried in Mirogoj, the main city cemetery.

Kučera made many contributions to the development of science and technology in Croatia, especially astronomy. When the Višnjan Observatory discovered its first asteroid on May 22, 1996, they named it (7364) Otonkucera. Matica hrvatska has an annual science award that bears his name.

== Works ==
- Crte o magnetizmu i elektricitetu (Notes on Magnetism and Electricity, 1892)
- Vrieme, crtice iz meteorologije (Weather: Notes on Meteorology, 1893)
- Naše nebo (Our Sky, 1895)
- Valovi i zrake (Waves and Rays, 1903)
- Gibanja i sile. Crtice iz mehanike neba i zemlje (Movement and Forces. Notes on the Mechanics of Sky and Earth, 1915)
- Telegraf i telefon bez žica (Wireless Telegraph and Telephone, 1925)

== Sources ==
- Muljevic, V. Physicist Dr. Oton Kucera promoter of technical sciences in Croatia, Hrvatski patentni glasnik, III, No. 5, 1996, Zagreb
- Kutleša, S. Oton Kučera (Petrinja, 1856 - Zagreb, 1931), Priroda No. 7-8, 1991–1992, Zagreb
- Oton Kučera : znanstvenik, popularizator prirodoslovlja i tehnike : 1856. - 1931., ed. by A. Getliher, Tehnički muzej, 1998, Zagreb

Cultural offices
Preceded by Đuro Arnold	President of Matica hrvatska 1909 – 1916	Succeeded by Krsto Pavletić
