= Vranji Vrh =

- Location in Slovenia
- Coordinates: 46°41′23.71″N 15°43′36.06″E
- Country: Slovenia
- Traditional region: Styria
- Statistical region: Drava
- Municipality: Šentilj

Area
  - Total: 2.15 km^{2} (0.83 sq mi)
- Elevation: 342.1 m (1,122 ft)

Population (2002)
  - Total: 428

Vranji Vrh (pronounced [ˈwɾaːnji ˈʋəɾx]) is a dispersed settlement in the Slovene Hills (Slovene: Slovenske gorice) southwest of Sladki Vrh in the Municipality of Šentilj in northeastern Slovenia.
