= Cirknica =

- Location in Slovenia
- Coordinates: 46°38′49.33″N 15°39′44.95″E
- Country: Slovenia
- Traditional region: Styria
- Statistical region: Drava
- Municipality: Šentilj

Area
  - Total: 2.4 km^{2} (0.93 sq mi)
- Elevation: 273.2 m (896 ft)

Population (2002)
  - Total: 100

Cirknica (pronounced [ˈtsiːɾknitsa]) is a dispersed settlement in the Slovene Hills (Slovene: Slovenske gorice) south of Šentilj v Slovenskih Goricah in the Municipality of Šentilj in northeastern Slovenia.
