= Srebotje =

- Location in Slovenia
- Coordinates: 46°40′11.66″N 15°42′17.93″E
- Country: Slovenia
- Traditional region: Styria
- Statistical region: Drava
- Municipality: Šentilj

Area
  - Total: 1.32 km^{2} (0.51 sq mi)
- Elevation: 341.2 m (1,119 ft)

Population (2002)
  - Total: 144

Srebotje (pronounced [sɾɛˈboːtjɛ], German: Lillachberg) is a small settlement in the Slovene Hills (Slovene: Slovenske gorice) south of Selnica ob Muri in the Municipality of Šentilj in northeastern Slovenia.

== Name ==
Srebotje was attested under various names in the past, including Srobotje, Lillovbreg, Lilov vrh, Lila, and Lila vrh in Slovene, and Lillachberg and Lilachberg in German.
