= Svečane =

- Location in Slovenia
- Coordinates: 46°41′36.79″N 15°44′57.2″E
- Country: Slovenia
- Traditional region: Styria
- Statistical region: Drava
- Municipality: Šentilj

Area
  - Total: 1.37 km^{2} (0.53 sq mi)
- Elevation: 250.3 m (821 ft)

Population (2002)
  - Total: 203

Svečane (pronounced [ˈsʋeːtʃanɛ], in older sources Svečani, German: Siegersdorf) is a settlement in the Slovene Hills (Slovene: Slovenske gorice) southeast of Sladki Vrh in the Municipality of Šentilj in northeastern Slovenia.
