= Zgornja Velka =

- Village
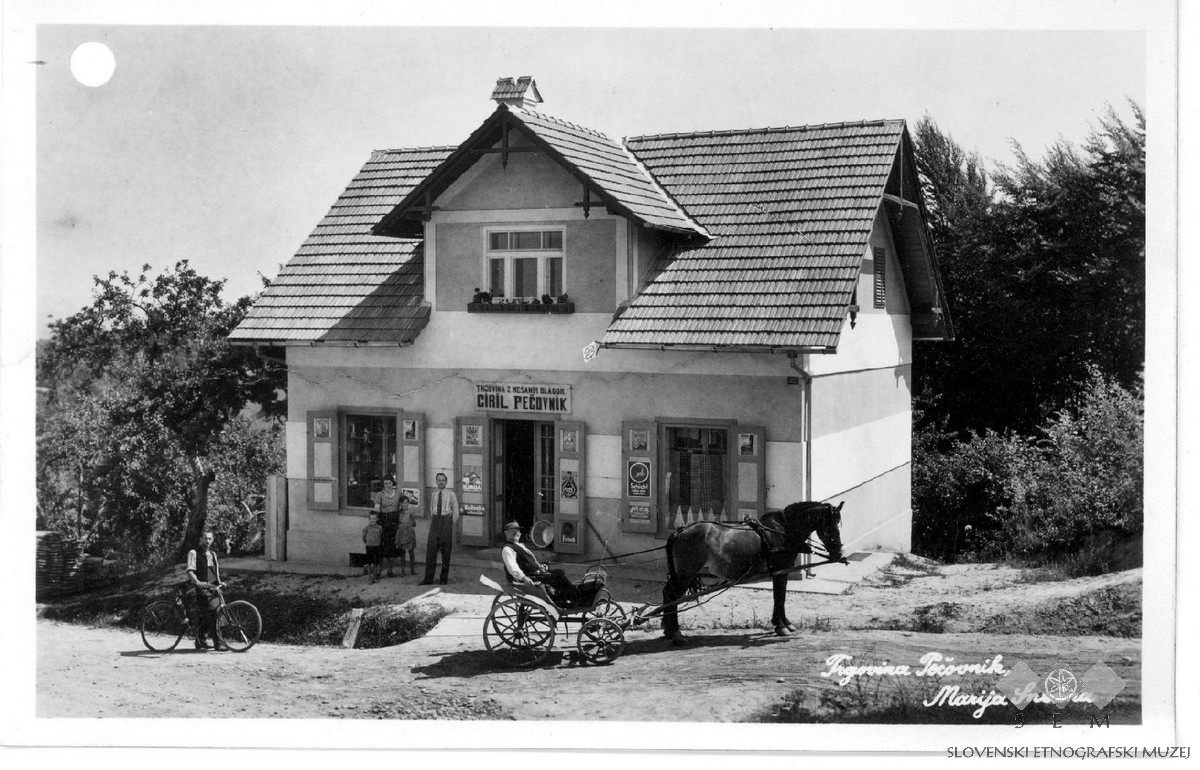
- Postcard of Zgornja Velka

- Location in Slovenia
- Coordinates: 46°40′35.39″N 15°46′13.99″E
- Country: Slovenia
- Traditional region: Styria
- Statistical region: Drava
- Municipality: Šentilj

Area
  - Total: 7.96 km^{2} (3.07 sq mi)
- Elevation: 402.8 m (1,322 ft)

Population (2002)
  - Total: 798

Zgornja Velka (pronounced [ˈzɡoːɾnja ˈʋeːlka], German: Oberwölling) is a dispersed settlement in the Slovene Hills (Slovene: Slovenske gorice) southeast of Sladki Vrh in the Municipality of Šentilj in northeastern Slovenia.

== Name ==
The name Zgornja Velka literally means 'upper Velka', contrasting with neighboring Spodnja Velka (literally, 'lower Velka'), which lies about 50 meters (160 ft) lower in elevation. The two settlements were attested in written sources as Welich in 1319, Welik in 1324, and Weliken in 1360. The toponym is derived from a hydronym, *Velika (voda/reka) 'big (creek/river)', referring to Velka Creek, a left tributary of the Pesnica River.

== Church ==
The parish church, built on a hill in the southern part of the settlement, is dedicated to Our Lady of the Snows and belongs to the Roman Catholic Archdiocese of Maribor. It was originally built in the late 17th century and rebuilt as a pilgrimage church in 1791.
