= Ten-Day War =

1991 Slovenia-Yugoslavia conflict

- Part of the Yugoslav Wars
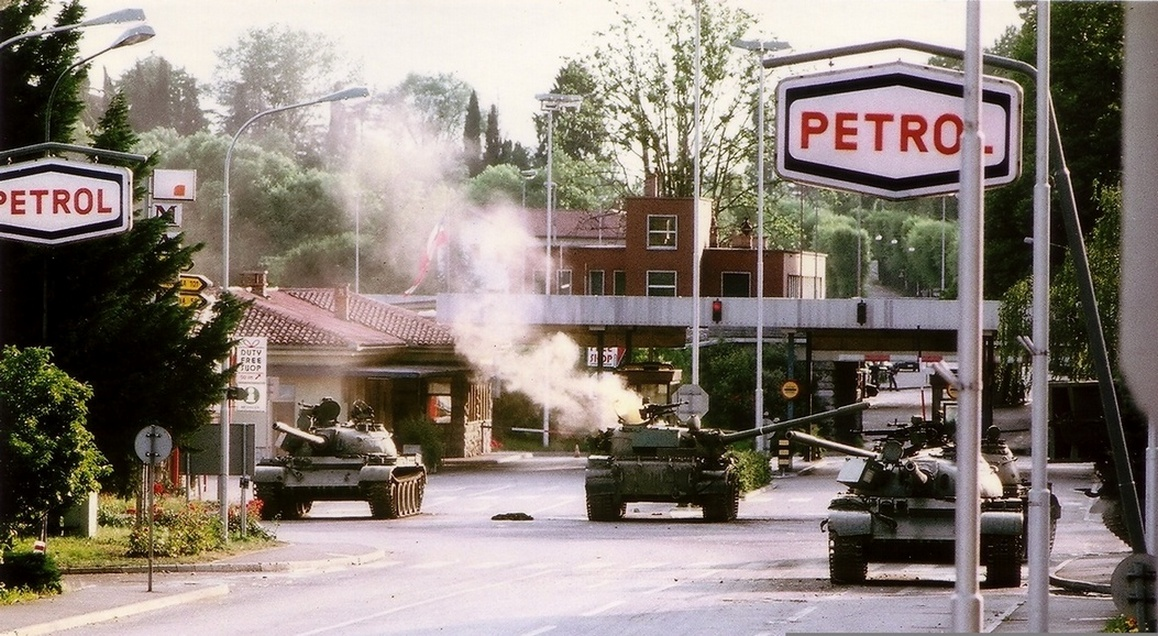
- Yugoslav T-55 tank hit by Slovenian anti-tank fire at the Italian border post, Rožna Dolina, Nova Gorica, during a Slovenian ambush
Date	27 June – 7 July 1991 (1 week and 3 days)
Location	Slovenia
Result	Slovenian victory
Territorial changes	Slovenia gains full independence from Yugoslavia

Belligerents
Yugoslavia	Slovenia

Commanders and leaders
(Socialist Federal Republic of Yugoslavia) Slobodan Milosević (Socialist Federal Republic of Yugoslavia) Borisav Jović (Socialist Federal Republic of Yugoslavia) Veljko Kadijević (Socialist Federal Republic of Yugoslavia) Blagoje Adžić (Socialist Federal Republic of Yugoslavia) Konrad Kolšek (Socialist Federal Republic of Yugoslavia) Aleksandar Vasiljević (Socialist Federal Republic of Yugoslavia) Milan Aksentijević (Socialist Federal Republic of Yugoslavia) Andrija Rašeta	(Slovenia) Milan Kučan (Slovenia) Lojze Peterle (Slovenia) Janez Janša (Slovenia) Igor Bavčar (Slovenia) Janez Drnovšek

Units involved
Yugoslav People's Army: Yugoslav Ground Forces	Slovenian Territorial Defence; Slovenian National Police

Strength
22,300 personnel	35,200 soldiers 10,000 policemen

Casualties and losses
45 killed 146 wounded 4,693 captured	19 killed 182 wounded
- 6 Slovenian and 12 foreign civilians killed

The Ten-Day War (Slovene: Desetdnevna vojna), or the Slovenian War of Independence (Slovene: Slovenska osamosvojitvena vojna), was a brief armed conflict that followed Slovenia's declaration of independence from Yugoslavia on 25 June 1991. It was fought between the Slovenian Territorial Defence and the Slovenian National Police Force on one side, and the Yugoslav People's Army (JNA) on the other. It lasted from 27 June 1991 until 7 July 1991, when the Brioni Accords were signed.

It was the second of the Yugoslav Wars to start in 1991, following the Croatian War of Independence in March, and by far the shortest of the conflicts with fewest overall casualties. The war was brief because the JNA, dominated by Serbs and Montenegrins, although still made up of all the nationalities of Yugoslavia, did not want to waste resources on this campaign. Slovenia was considered "ethnically homogeneous" and therefore of no interest to the Yugoslav government. The military was preoccupied with the fighting in Croatia, where the Serb and Montenegrin majority in Yugoslavia had greater territorial interests. In the BBC documentary The Death of Yugoslavia, which used archival footage, Slobodan Milošević, President of Serbia, is recorded stating that "I was against using the Yugoslav Army in Slovenia", while Borisav Jović, President of the Presidency of Yugoslavia, stated that, "With Slovenia out of the way, we could dictate the terms to the Croats."

== Background ==
After the death of Yugoslav president Josip Broz Tito in 1980, underlying political, ethnic, religious, and economic tensions within Yugoslavia surfaced. In 1989 Slobodan Milošević, Chairman of the Central Committee of the League of Communists of Serbia since 1986, became President of Serbia, the largest and most populous of the six Yugoslav republics. Mateja Sednak explains,

As... Milošević moved to consolidate power by centralizing the state, the governments of the other republics sought to loosen the central grip on power by devolving as much constitutional power as possible to each of the republics and autonomous provinces.

A series of disagreements among delegates persisted until four of the six Yugoslav republics each made decisions to seek independence from Yugoslavia. Slovenia was among the republics aiming for independence, and it was subsequently recognised by Germany and the Vatican.

In April 1990, Slovenia held its first democratic multi-party elections, won by the DEMOS coalition.

=== Preparations for war ===
On 23 December 1990, Slovenia held a referendum, which passed with 88.5% of overall electorate supporting independence (95.7% of votes cast), with a turnout of 93.3%. The Slovenian government was well aware that the federal government in Belgrade might seek to use military force to quash Slovenia's move towards independence. Immediately after the Slovenian elections, the JNA announced a new defence doctrine that would apply across the country. The Tito-era doctrine of "General People's Defence", in which each republic maintained a territorial defence (TO), was to be replaced by a centrally directed system of defence. The republics would lose their role in defence matters, and their TOs would be disarmed and subordinated to the JNA's headquarters in Belgrade.

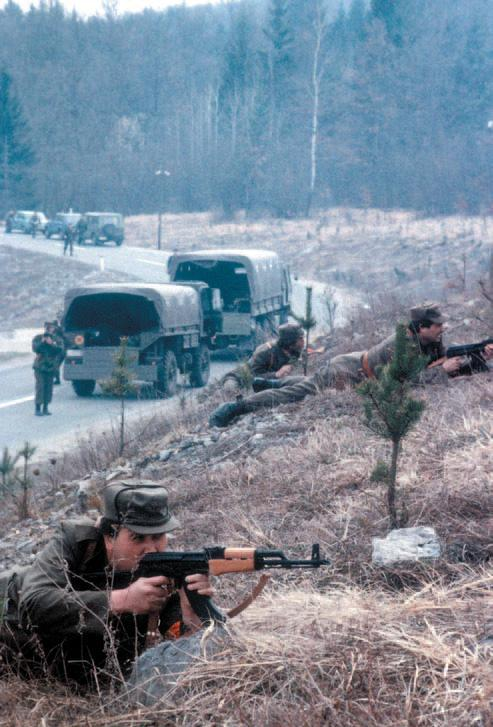
Slovenian Territorial Defence military drills held in March 1991

The Slovenian government resisted these moves and successfully ensured that the majority of Slovenian Territorial Defence equipment was kept out of the hands of the JNA. It also declared in a constitutional amendment passed on 28 September 1990 that its TO would be under the sole command of the Slovenian government. At the same time, the Slovenian government set up a secret alternative command structure, known as the Manoeuvre Structures of National Protection (Manevrska struktura narodne zaščite, or MSNZ). This was an existing but antiquated institution, unique to Slovenia, which was intended to enable the republic to form an ad hoc defence structure, akin to a home guard. It was of negligible importance prior to 1990, with antiquated weapons and few members. However, the DEMOS-led government realised that the MSNZ could be adapted to provide a parallel organisation to the TO that would be entirely in the hands of the Slovenian government.

When the JNA tried to take control of the Slovenian Territorial Defence, the TO's command structure was simply replaced by that of the parallel MSNZ. Between May and October 1990, some 21,000 Slovenian Territorial Defence and police personnel were secretly mobilised into the MSNZ command structure, of which the federal government was wholly unaware. The Slovenian government also undertook detailed planning of a military campaign against the JNA, which resulted in the production of an operational and tactical plan by November 1990 – over seven months before the conflict actually began.

The Slovenes were aware that they would not be able to deter the JNA's forces for an extended period of time. Under Defence Minister Janez Janša, they adopted a strategy based on an asymmetric warfare approach. TO units would carry out a guerrilla campaign, using anti-tank weapons and anti-aircraft missiles to ambush the JNA's units. Tank columns could be trapped by destroying the lead and rear vehicles in favourable terrain – for instance, on a narrow mountain road where room for manoeuvre was limited – enabling the rest to be dealt with more easily. In preparation for this, the Slovenian government covertly bought lightweight missile systems from foreign suppliers, notably the SA-7 Grail (Strela) anti-aircraft missile and the German-designed Armbrust anti-tank system. Hit-and-run and delaying tactics were to be preferred and frontal clashes were to be avoided since in such situations the JNA's superior firepower would have been very difficult to overcome.

== Conflict ==
Slovenia and Croatia passed their acts of independence on 25 June 1991. This "advance" on the date of independence was a critical element of the Slovenian plan to gain an early advantage in the expected conflict. The Slovenian government fully expected the Yugoslav military to respond with force on the day of the declaration of independence or shortly afterwards. By secretly advancing the date by 24 hours, the Slovenians caught the Yugoslav government off guard, which had set 26 June as the date for its move.

Although the JNA was adamantly opposed to Slovenian independence, it was divided about what to do. The JNA Chief of Staff, Colonel-General Blagoje Adžić, advocated a large-scale military operation to remove the Slovenian government and bring "healthy forces" to power in the republic. His political superior, the Yugoslav defence minister, General of the Army Veljko Kadijević, insisted on a more cautious approach – essentially a show of force that would convince the Slovenian government to back down on its declaration of independence. After some debate, Kadijević got his way.

It is unclear how much the civilian members of the Yugoslav government were involved in the decision to resort to force in Slovenia. Ante Marković, the president of the Federal Executive Council (equivalent to prime minister) is reported to have said that the federal government had not been informed of the Army's actions.

=== 26 June 1991 ===
On the morning of 26 June, units of the JNA's 13th Corps left their barracks in Rijeka, Croatia, to move towards Slovenia's borders with Italy. The move immediately led to a strong reaction from local Slovenians, who organized spontaneous barricades and demonstrations against the JNA's actions.

By this time, the Slovenian government had already put into action its plan to seize control of the republic's border posts and the international airport at Brnik. The personnel manning the border posts were, in most cases, already Slovenians, so the Slovenian take-over mostly simply amounted to changing of uniforms and insignia, without any fighting. This was undertaken, in the words of Janez Janša, to "establish our sovereignty in the key triangle, border-customs-air control". It also had important practical effects. The border crossings were a major source of revenue. In addition, by taking control of the borders, the Slovenians were able to establish defensive positions against an expected JNA attack. This meant that the JNA would have to fire the first shot. It was fired on 26 June at 14:30 in Divača by an officer of the JNA.

=== 27 June 1991 ===
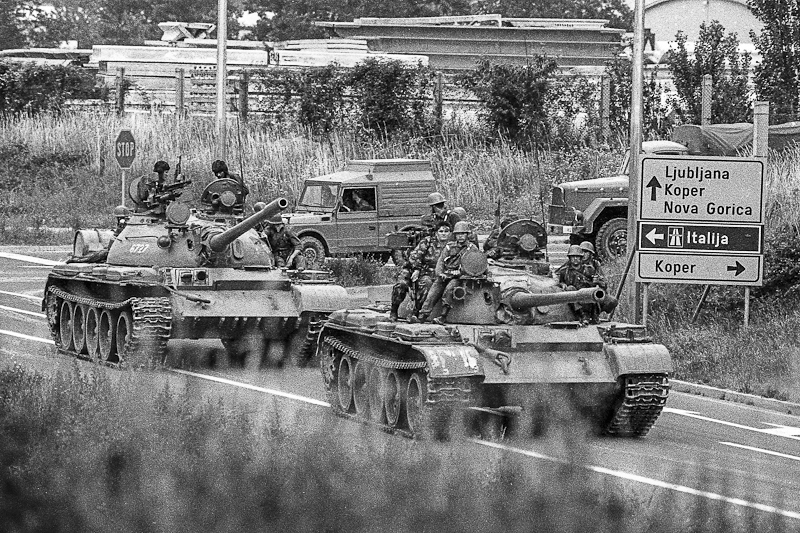
26 June; arrival of the JNA tank column at Vrtojba border crossing

Further JNA troop movements took place in the early hours of 27 June. A unit of the JNA's 306th Anti-Aircraft Regiment, based in Karlovac, Croatia, crossed the Slovenian border at Metlika. A few hours later, a column of tanks and armoured personnel carriers of the JNA 1st Armoured Brigade left their barracks at Vrhnika near Ljubljana, heading for the airport at Brnik. They arrived a few hours later and took control of the facilities. As the JNA was the federal army, its forces were customarily deployed in various places within the federal republics including Slovenia. To the east, JNA units left Maribor heading for the nearby border crossing at Šentilj and the border town of Dravograd further west. The Yugoslav Air Force aircraft dropped leaflets over various parts of Slovenia bearing the messages "We invite you to peace and cooperation!" and "All resistance will be crushed."

In the early hours of 27 June the Slovenian leadership was told of the movements of the JNA. The military leadership of the Fifth Military District, which included Slovenia, was in telephone contact with Slovenian president Milan Kučan, telling him that the troops' mission was limited to taking over the border crossings and airport. A meeting of the Slovene presidency was hastily convened at which Kučan and the rest of the members decided on armed resistance.

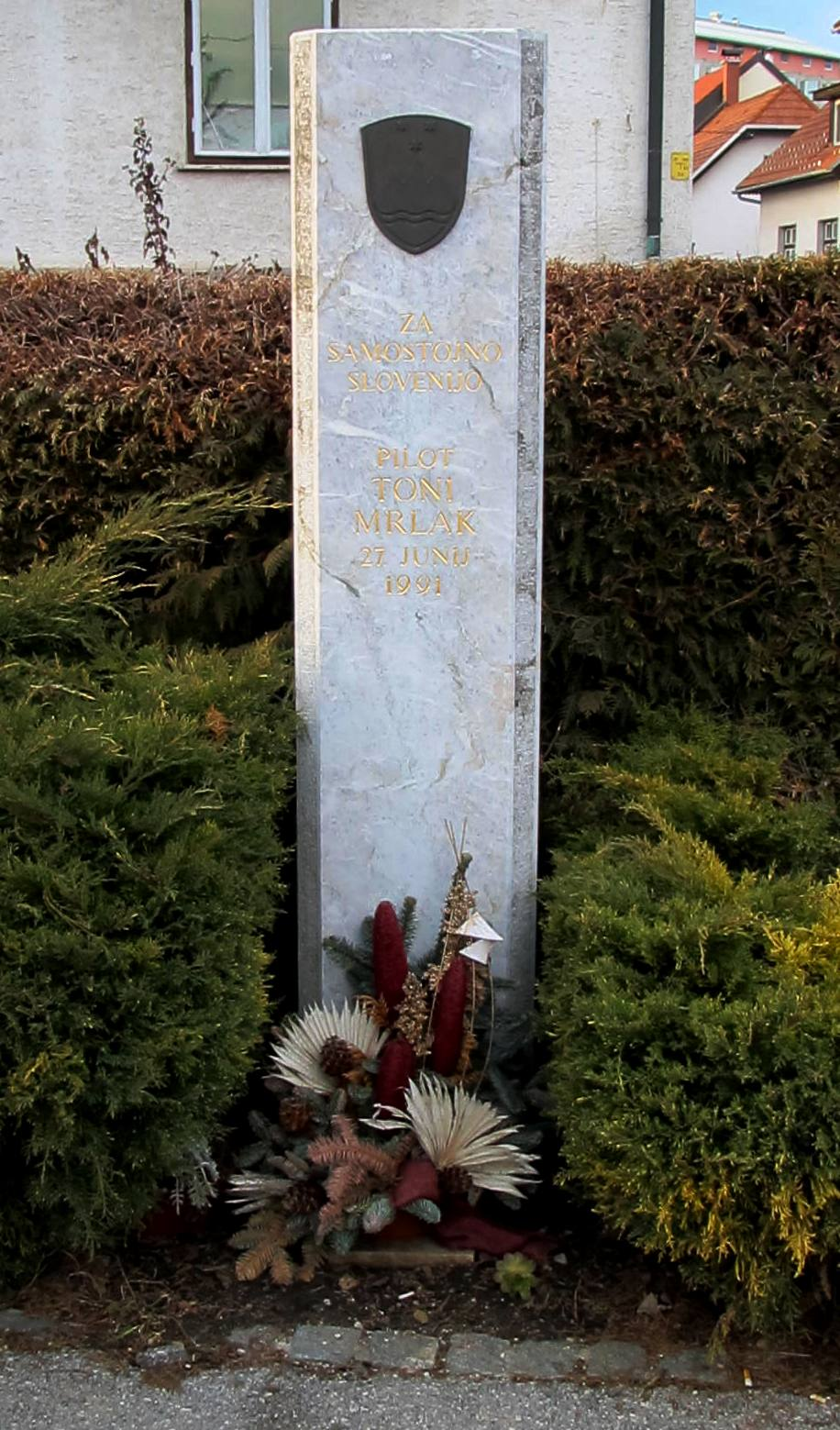
A memorial to Slovenian helicopter pilot Toni Mrlak in Ljubljana

The Slovenian government had received warnings that the JNA would use helicopters to ferry special forces troops to strategic locations. It issued a warning to the JNA's 5th Military Command District in Zagreb that if helicopters continued to be used they would be shot down. The warning was disregarded by the JNA leadership, which still believed that the Slovenians would back down rather than fight. This was, however, a disastrous miscalculation. In the afternoon of 27 June, the Slovenian TO shot down two JNA helicopters with SA-7 missiles, one of them a Gazelle over Rožna Dolina, Ljubljana, killing the occupants, one of whom, Toni Mrlak, was a Slovenian pilot, as the JNA's forces consisted of nationals from all the republics. It was later discovered that the Gazelle which Mrlak had been flying was unarmed, and was carrying only bread for the Yugoslav soldiers.

The Slovenian TO also took up positions around JNA barracks in various locations, effectively besieging them, and launched a series of attacks on JNA forces across Slovenia. At Brnik, a Slovenian TO unit attacked the JNA troops holding the airport, and at Trzin a firefight developed in which four JNA soldiers and one Slovenian TO soldier (Edvard Peperko) were killed and the remainder of the JNA unit was forced to surrender. Attacks were also launched by Slovenian TO units on JNA tank columns at Pesnica, Ormož and Koseze near Ilirska Bistrica. A tank column from the JNA's 32nd Mechanised Brigade, advancing from Varaždin in Croatia, was blocked at Ormož near the Slovenian border and found itself unable to break through a Slovenian barricade.

Despite the confusion and fighting, the JNA nonetheless successfully accomplished much of its military mission. By midnight on 27 June it had captured all of the crossings along the Italian border, all but three crossings on the Austrian border and several of the new crossing points established along Slovenia's border with Croatia. However, many of its units were still stuck in vulnerable positions across Slovenia.

=== 28 June 1991 ===
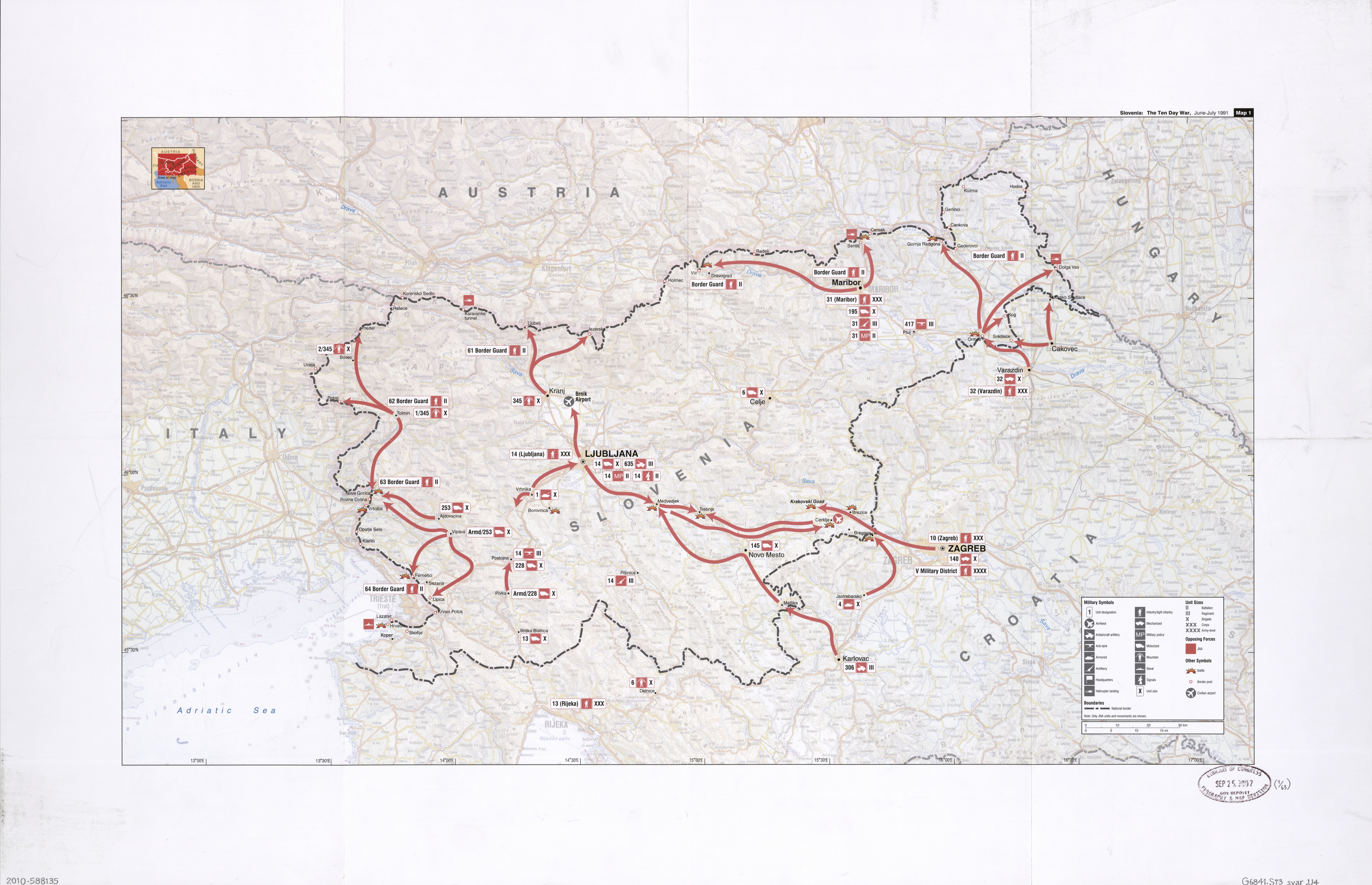
Yugoslav movements in Slovenia during the Ten-Day War

During the night of 27–28 June, Slovenian TO units were ordered to undertake a general offensive against the JNA. The Slovenian defence ministry ordered:

At all locations where RS (Republic of Slovenia) armed forces (Slovenian Territorial Defence) have the tactical advantage, offensive actions against enemy units and facilities will be carried out. The enemy will be summoned to surrender, the shortest deadline possible for surrender given and action taken using all available weapons. While in action, any necessary arrangements will be made to evacuate and protect the civilians.

Additional fighting took place throughout the day. The JNA tank column that had been attacked at Pesnica the previous day was blocked by impromptu barricades of Slovenian trucks at Štrihovec, a few kilometres short of the border with Austria, where it again came under attack by Slovenian TO personnel and Slovenian police. The Yugoslav Air Force mounted two airstrikes in support of the JNA forces at Strihovec, killing four truck drivers. At Medvedjek in central Slovenia, another JNA tank column came under attack at a truck barricade, where air raids killed six truck drivers.

Heavy fighting broke out at Nova Gorica on the border with Italy, where the Slovenian special forces fired two Armbrust antitank rockets and 700 rounds from infantry weapons. Slovene troops destroyed two JNA T-55 tanks and captured an additional three, plus a BTS-1 military engineering vehicle. Three JNA soldiers were killed and 16 wounded, among them the commander of the armoured column, and 98 surrendered. A number of wounded were admitted to Gorizia's hospital after crossing the Italian border. Some sources claim that this was the decisive battle of the war.

The border crossing at Holmec was captured by Slovenian TO forces. Two Slovenian and three JNA soldiers were killed, and 45 JNA soldiers captured. The JNA barracks at Bukovje Mansion in Bukovje near Dravograd were attacked by Slovenian TO units and a JNA weapons depot at Borovnica fell to the Slovenian TO, significantly improving the Slovenians' supply of weapons. The Yugoslav Air Force carried out attacks at a number of locations across the country, most notably at Brnik Airport, where two Austrian journalists (Nikolas Vogel and Norbert Werner) were killed and four Adria Airways airliners were seriously damaged. The Yugoslav Air Force also attacked the Slovenian TO military headquarters at Kočevska Reka and flew sorties against radio and television transmitters at Krim, Kum, Trdina Peak, and Nanos in an attempt to silence the Slovenian government broadcasts.

By the end of the day, the JNA still held many of its positions but was rapidly losing ground. JNA was beginning to experience problems with desertions – many Slovenian members of the JNA quit their units or simply changed sides – and both the troops on the ground and the leadership in Belgrade appeared to have little idea of what to do next.

=== 29 June 1991 ===
The outbreak of the war galvanised diplomatic efforts by the European Community to find an end to the crisis. Three EC foreign ministers met with Slovenian and Yugoslav government representatives in Zagreb during the night of 28–29 June and agreed on a ceasefire plan, but this was not put into practice. In the morning, the Slovenians achieved several significant military successes. The JNA troops near Brnik surrendered to Slovenian TO forces, who had surrounded the airport overnight.

In the north, several JNA tanks were captured near Strihovec and later reorganised into a TO tank company. JNA special forces attempted a maritime landing at Hrvatini but were ambushed and repulsed by the Slovenians, suffering two dead and three wounded. The JNA-held border crossings at Vrtojba and Šentilj also fell to the Slovenian TO, who seized the troops' weapons and tanks, providing a much-needed boost to their arsenal.

The JNA issued an ultimatum to Slovenia, demanding an immediate cessation of hostilities by 09:00 on 30 June. In response, the Slovenian Assembly adopted a resolution calling for a peaceful solution to the crisis that did not jeopardise Slovenian independence, and rejected the JNA ultimatum.

=== 30 June 1991 ===
Skirmishing continued in several places during the day. Separatist forces seized the strategic Karawanks Tunnel under the Alps on the border with Austria and captured nine JNA tanks near Nova Gorica, on the border with Italy. The entire JNA garrison at Dravograd – 16 officers and 400 men, plus equipment – surrendered, and the garrisons at Tolmin and Bovec also fell to the Slovenians. The weapons captured from the garrisons were quickly re-issued to the Slovenian forces.

=== 1 July 1991 ===
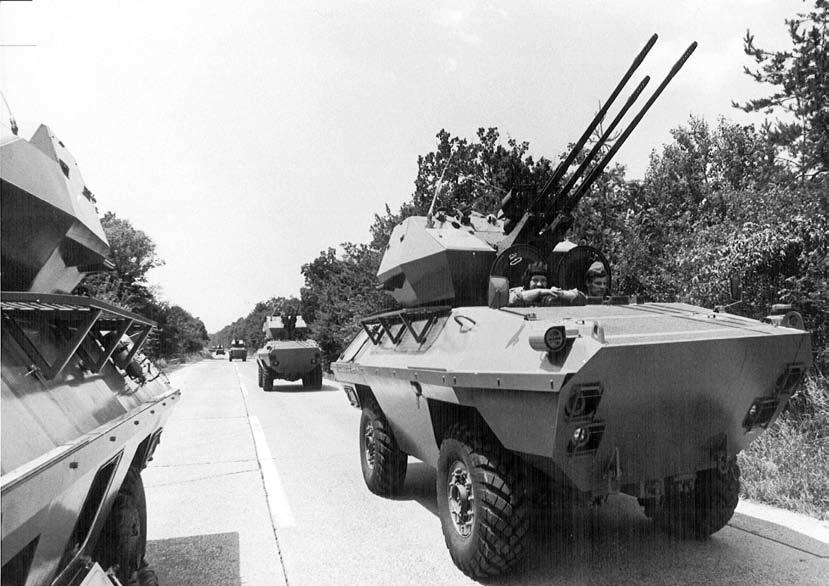
A column of JNA BOV-3 armoured vehicles in the Krakovo Forest

More skirmishes took place, with Slovenian TO forces taking over a JNA facility at Nova Vas, south of Maribor. The JNA's ammunition dump at Črni Vrh caught fire and was destroyed in a massive explosion, damaging much of the town. However, the Slovenians successfully captured depots at Pečovnik, Bukovžlak, and Zaloška Gorica, taking possession of some 70 truckloads of ammunition and explosives.

The JNA 306th Light Air Defence Artillery Regiment's column retreated from its exposed position at Medvedjek and headed into the Krakovo Forest (Krakovski gozd) near the Croatian border. It ran into a blockade near the town of Krško and was surrounded by Slovenian forces, but refused to surrender, probably hoping for help from a relief column.

In the meantime, the JNA's leadership sought permission to change the tempo of its operations. Defence Minister Veljko Kadijević informed the Yugoslav cabinet that the JNA's first plan – a limited operation to secure Slovenia's border crossings – had failed, and that it was time to put into operation the backup plan of a full-scale invasion and imposition of military rule in Slovenia. However, the collective presidency – headed at the time by Serbia's Borisav Jović – refused to authorise such an operation. The JNA Chief of Staff, General Blagoje Adžić, was furious and publicly denounced "the federal organs [which] continually hampered us, demanding negotiations while they [the Slovenians] were attacking us with all means."

=== 2 July 1991 ===
The heaviest fighting of the war to date took place during 2 July. The Domžale radio transmitter was attacked and heavily damaged by two Yugoslav Air Force MiG-21 planes. Units from the JNA's Fourth Armoured Brigade attempted to move up from Jastrebarsko in Croatia but were beaten back near the border town of Bregana. The Slovenian TO mounted successful attacks on border crossings at Šentilj, Gornja Radgona, Fernetiči and Gorjansko, overrunning them and taking a number of JNA troops prisoner. A protracted engagement between JNA and Slovenian TO forces took place during the afternoon and evening at Dravograd, and a number of JNA facilities around the country fell to Slovenian forces.

=== 3 July 1991 ===
Fighting continued in Slovenia, with a JNA relief force heading for the Gornja Radgona border crossing being halted near Radenci. JNA forces at the Kog border crossing were also attacked by TO units. In the evening, the JNA agreed to a ceasefire and a withdrawal to barracks. In a separate incident not far from Radenci, in the village of Hrastje–Mota, a Yugoslav Mi-8 helicopter developed mechanical problems and was forced to land. The helicopter was seized by the Slovene military, but was deemed unsuitable for the newly created air force, and handed back to Belgrade on 13 August.

=== 4–6 July 1991 ===
With a ceasefire now in force, the two sides disengaged. Slovenian forces took control of all of the country's border crossings, and JNA units were allowed to withdraw peacefully to barracks and to cross the border to Croatia.

=== 7 July 1991 and afterwards ===
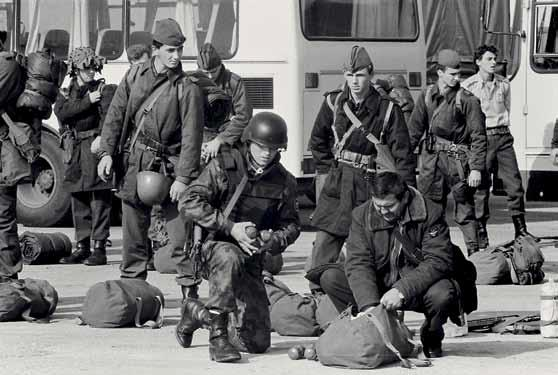
Slovene military member (front left) supervising JNA personnel before departure

The Ten-Day War was formally ended with the Brioni Accord, signed on the Croatian Brijuni Islands. It was agreed that Slovenia and Croatia would postpone their independence for three months, dependent on the continuation of the ceasefire and the Slovenian police and armed forces (TO) were recognised as sovereign on their territory.

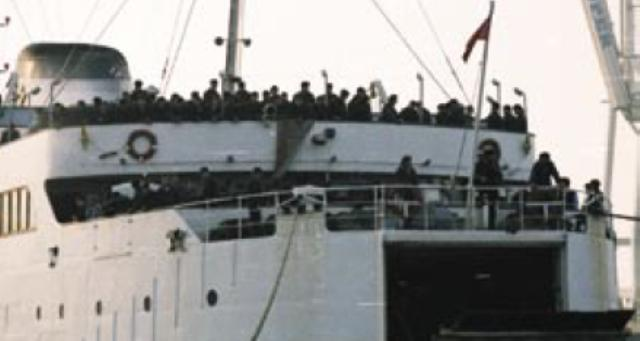
The last JNA troops leaving Slovenian soil by sea

It was agreed that all Yugoslav military units would leave Slovenia, with the Yugoslav government setting a deadline of the end of October to complete the process. The Slovenian government insisted that the withdrawal should proceed on its terms; the JNA was not allowed to take much of its heavy weaponry and equipment, which was later either deployed locally or sold to other Yugoslav republics. The withdrawal began about ten days later and was completed by 26 October.

== Casualties ==
Due to the short duration and low intensity of the war, casualties were not high. According to Slovenian estimates, the JNA suffered 44 fatalities and 146 wounded, while the Slovenians had 19 killed and 182 wounded, six Slovenian civilians were killed. Twelve foreign nationals were also killed in the conflict, principally journalists and Bulgarian truck drivers who had strayed into the line of fire. 4,692 JNA soldiers and 252 federal police officers were captured by the Slovenian side. According to post-war assessments made by the JNA, its material losses amounted to 31 tanks, 22 armoured personnel carriers, six helicopters, 6,787 infantry weapons, 87 artillery pieces and 124 air defence weapons damaged, destroyed or confiscated. Property damage was not heavy, due to the scattered and short-term nature of the fighting.

== Holmec incident ==
The border station at Holmec was the location of an alleged war crime perpetrated by Slovenian TO forces on 28 June, and filmed by the Austrian public broadcasting station ORF. Video footage shows a small group of JNA soldiers standing or walking slowly with raised hands, holding up a white sheet in an apparent attempt to surrender. Moments later, gunfire is heard and the soldiers fall or jump to the ground. Neither the origin of the gunfire nor its exact effect are clearly visible on the video segment. Slovene officials maintain that the JNA soldiers jumped for cover and were not hit, and that the matter was thoroughly investigated years ago. However, the incident sparked renewed public debate after the footage was shown on Serbian TV station B92 in 2006, with many claiming that the soldiers were shot and killed by Slovenian TO troops and that Slovenia is trying to cover up the affair.

The fate of the JNA soldiers identified on the footage is disputed. One report claims that the soldiers were still alive, 15 years after the conflict. Other reports identify three young soldiers as victims (Zoran Ješić, Goran Maletić and Antonio Šimunović) and claim that they were killed in the Holmec incident.

== Strategic aspects ==
The actions of Slovenia's forces were largely dictated by the military strategy devised some months before and were tightly integrated with an equally detailed media management plan. An international media centre was established prior to the outbreak of conflict with Jelko Kacin designated to act as information minister and Slovenia's public face to the world. The Slovenian government and media successfully presented the conflict to Western European audiences as a case of a "David versus Goliath" struggle between an emerging democracy and an authoritarian communist state, and the columns of Yugoslav tanks brought to mind the events of the Tiananmen Square protests of 1989 two years earlier. This won considerable international sympathy and favourable media coverage for the cause of independent Slovenia.

The Slovenians had the advantage of superior morale, compared to their adversaries in the Yugoslav army. Many of the Yugoslav soldiers did not realise they were taking part in a real military operation, rather than an exercise, until they came under attack. They sent only 2,000 untried conscripts, which split up into smaller groups. It was a tactical error. The officer corps was dominated by Serbs and Montenegrins and in many cases ideologically committed to Yugoslav unity. The rank and file troops however were conscripts, many of whom had no strong motivation in fighting against Slovenes. Of the soldiers of the 5th Military District, which was in action in Slovenia, in 1990 30% were Albanians, 20% Croats, 15 to 20% Serbs and Montenegrins, 10% Bosniaks, and 8% Slovenes.

The Slovenians were also well aware that the Serbian government of Slobodan Milošević was not particularly concerned about Slovenia's independence, given the lack of any significant Serbian minority in the country. On 30 June, Defence Minister General Kadijević suggested to the Yugoslav federal presidency a massive attack on Slovenia to break down the unexpectedly heavy resistance. But the Serb representative, Borisav Jović, shocked the military establishment by declaring that Serbia did not support further military action against Slovenia. Serbia was at this point more concerned with the situation in Croatia; even before the war had ended, JNA troops were already repositioning themselves for the imminent war in Croatia.

According to the journalist Hermann Tertsch, who covered that war firsthand:

The weak military deployment of the federal army had only two reasons, the external cosmetic, to claim that Belgrade defended its international borders. And the collection of property from its bases in Slovenia, especially from the borders with Austria and Italy. On the 25th the independence of this ethnically homogeneous republic had been proclaimed, without a religious minority or any Serb legacy. On July 7, having collected properties and documents from the barracks, the Yugoslav army, in reality already pan-Serbian, left a Slovenia that Milosevic and his generals did not give a damn about.

== Consequences of the war ==
For Slovenia, the war marked the decisive defence of its independence in regard to Yugoslavia. It was officially recognised by all European Community member states on 15 January 1992 and joined the United Nations on 22 May.

The war led to a series of major shifts on the Yugoslav side. The JNA eventually lost nearly all of its Slovenian and Croat personnel, becoming an almost entirely Serbian and Montenegrin force. Its poor performance in Slovenia and later in Croatia discredited its leadership – Kadijević resigned as defence minister in January 1992, and Adžić was forced into medical retirement shortly afterwards.

The Slovenian and Croatian governments were urged by the European Commission to freeze their declaration of independence for a period of three months, hoping to ease tension, to which Slovenia and Croatia agreed. Slovenia used the period to consolidate its institutions, deliver some of the most urgent economic reforms and prepare for international recognition of the country.

== See also ==
- History of Slovenia
- Order of Freedom of the Republic of Slovenia – Decorations given to heroes of the Ten-Day War in Slovenia
- Statehood Day (Slovenia)
