= Stara Gora pri Šentilju =

- Location in Slovenia
- Coordinates: 46°39′24.83″N 15°38′15.07″E
- Country: Slovenia
- Traditional region: Styria
- Statistical region: Drava
- Municipality: Šentilj

Area
  - Total: 1.54 km^{2} (0.59 sq mi)
- Elevation: 370.3 m (1,215 ft)

Population (2002)
  - Total: 86

Stara Gora pri Šentilju (pronounced [ˈstaːɾa ˈɡɔːɾa pɾi ʃɛnˈtiːlju] or [ˈstaːɾa ˈɡɔːɾa pɾi ʃənˈtiːlju]) is a small dispersed settlement in the Slovene Hills (Slovene: Slovenske gorice) south of Šentilj v Slovenskih Goricah in the Municipality of Šentilj in northeastern Slovenia.

== Name ==
The name of the settlement was changed from Stara Gora to Stara Gora pri Šentilju in 1953.
