= Milan Aksentijević =

Yugoslav army Major-General

- Born: 1 September 1935; Kragujevac, Yugoslavia
- Military career
- Allegiance: (Socialist Federal Republic of Yugoslavia) Yugoslavia
- Branch: Yugoslav People's Army
- Service years: 1953–1992
- Rank: Major-General
- Conflicts: Ten Day War; Croatian War of Independence; Bosnian War

Milan Aksentijević (Serbian Cyrillic: Милан Аксентијевић, born 1 September 1935 in Kragujevac) is a retired Yugoslav army Major-General. Aksentijević was one of the few senior Yugoslav army officers to be involved in all three of the wars in Slovenia, Croatia, and Bosnia during the break-up of Yugoslavia.

== Early life ==
Milan Aksentijević was born on 1 September 1935 in the family of the Orthodox priest Zivojin Aksentijević in Kragujevac. His parents were killed in the Kragujevac massacre in 1941 during the Second World War. In 1951, General Aksentijević moved with his family to the People's Republic of Slovenia. In 1953, he graduated from the School for Active Engineering and Chemical Officers of the Yugoslav People's Army (JNA). He was a member of the League of Communists of Yugoslavia (CPY). The beginning of active military service in the JNA began on August 1, 1953. Aksentijević graduated from the Vuša Military Academy and the School of National Defense, as well as postgraduate studies there. He held a number of positions in the JNA during his career.

In the first multi-party elections held in Slovenia in April 1990, Aksentijević was the only JNA representative elected to the Slovenian parliament, as the JNA delegate to the Chamber of Associated Labour. Aksentijević was one of the few members of the Slovenian parliament to vote against independence in the 25 June 1991 parliamentary vote. He held his position as delegate until 28 August, 1991.

== Break up of Yugoslavia ==
Aksentijević opposed Slovenian independence. On 22 May 1991 Aksentijević, then a Lieutenant-Colonel, set a deadline of the next day for the people of Maribor to accede to an ultimatum to deliver over money, recruits, information about recruits, and to close Slovenian militia training centres. Aksentijević's demands were ignored. Aksentijević's base was home to the trial of the Ljubljana Four. During the Ten-Day War between Slovene militia and the JNA, Aksentijević commanded a base surrounded by Slovenes. Interviewed for the BBC documentary The Death of Yugoslavia he recalled angrily asking for orders from JNA high command, asking "Are we an army or not? ... If we're an army we should act. If not, we should retreat".

After the Slovenian independence he was deployed to Croatia and Croatian War of Independence on the side of the JNA. On 13 September 1991 he was captured near Tušilović by the "Lučko Anti-terrorist Unit" when the helicopter he was on was forced to land by Croat fire. After spending seventy days in the Remetinec prison, Aksentijević was released as part of a group of 28 JNA officers exchanged for a group of 27 pro-Croat figures including Anton Kikaš. The exchange took place on 25 November 1991 at Pleso Airport near Zagreb.

From July 1991 to 31 December 1991, Aksentijević was the Assistant Commander of the 5th Military District of the Armed Forces of the SFRY for Moral Education and Legal Affairs. Later he was appointed leader of the Group for Cooperation with the UN Peacekeeping Forces in Sarajevo during the war in Bosnia, where he remained until his forced retirement on 12 May 1992. Whilst in Bosnia Aksentijevic was the chief negotiator with the Vice President of the Presidency of Bosnia and Herzegovina (BiH), Ejup Ganic, on the release of Alija Izetbegovic and the events that surrounding the showdown in Dobrovoljacka Street in Sarajevo on 3 May 1992.

== Later life ==
In January 1992 Aksentijević was stripped of Slovene citizenship due to his role in the Ten Day War. His family, including his wife who is a Slovene, had been forced out of their flat. In March 1995 Aksentijević returned to Slovenia on a tourist visa and was subsequently allowed to remain in Slovenia. In 2002 war crimes charges against Aksentijević were dropped for lack of evidence, however Aksentijević has not been allowed to gain Slovene citizenship. Aksentijević currently lives in Golnik and is active in various groups for Serbian Slovenes.

In 2020 Spomenka Hribar, in a speech commemorating the 30th anniversary of the agreement on a referendum on Slovene independence, appealed to Slovene President Borut Pahor to restore Aksentijević's citizenship. Slovene prime minister Janez Janša responded to this request by accusing Aksentijević of committing war crimes in Bosnia and elsewhere, accusations that Aksentijević denies.
