= Domžale radio transmitter =

Coordinates: 46°7′37.82″N 14°35′10.96″E

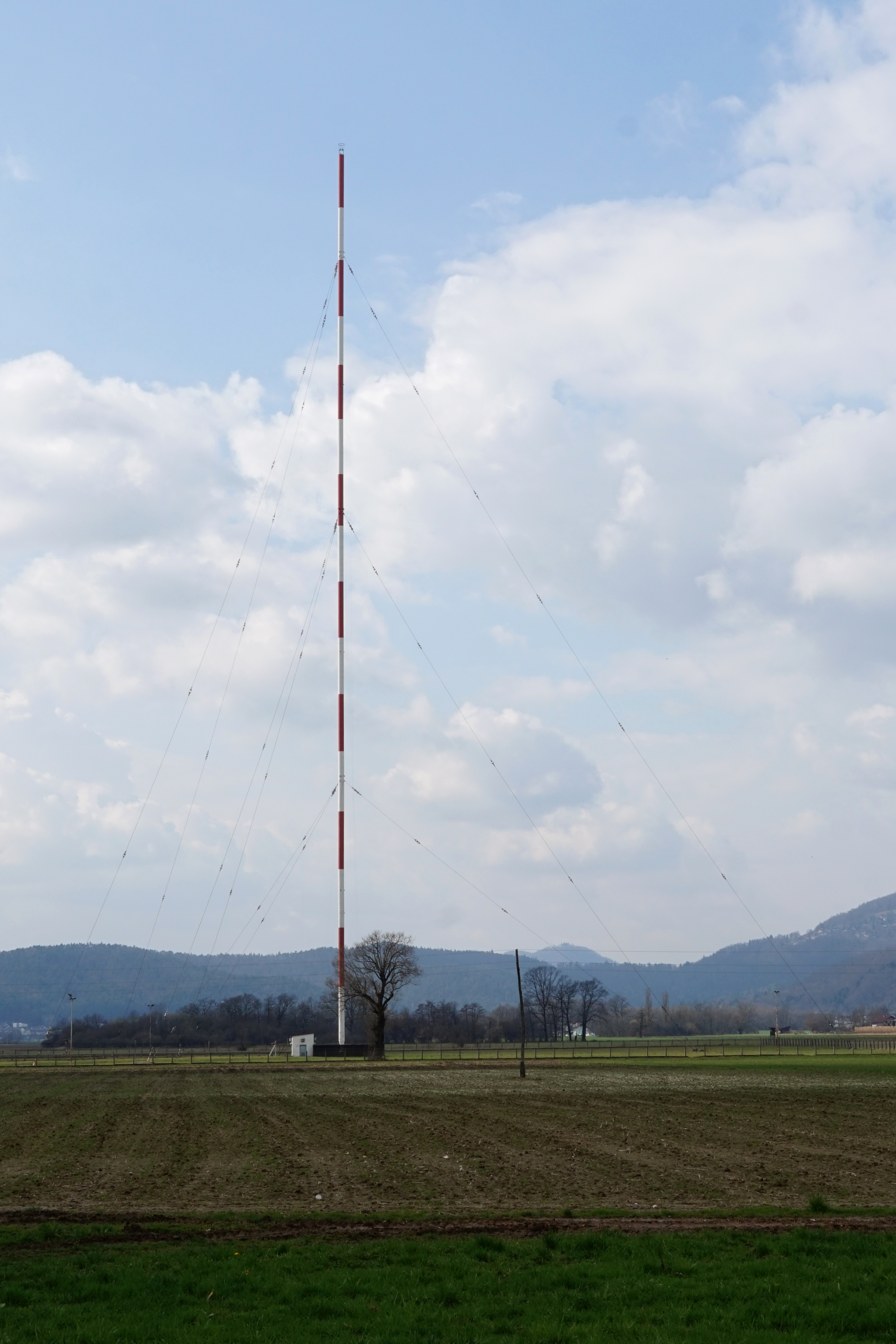
Domžale Radio Transmitter

The Domžale radio transmitter is a former facility for medium wave broadcasting in Domžale, in Slovenia. The transmitter is fully transistorized. It could be received easily at a medium wave frequency of 918 kHz across the whole of Europe at night-time. It was the strongest radio transmitter of the Republic of Slovenia, broadcasting the first national radio channel.

== History ==
The first transmitter was built in 1927 and started operation in September 1928 with the transmission from a fair in Ljubljana, and later a solemn broadcast of Franc Finžgar talking about Slovene language and Oton Župančič reading verses from his poem Duma. The transmitter had the power of 2.5 kilowatts, upgraded in 1932 to 5 kW and in 1939 to over 100 kW. A t-antenna with 5 wires, it was hung on two 120-metre tall steel framework masts, which were insulated against the ground. It was destroyed by German airplanes on 11 April 1941, during the invasion of Yugoslavia in World War II.

In 1949, the reconstruction of the transmitter started under the new socialist government. The transmitter was equipped with a 60-metre tall guyed tube mast, which was insulated against the ground. It entered service on 25 March 1951. This radio mast was replaced a little later by a 136-metre high guyed steel framework mast, which was also insulated against the ground.

In 1969, the transmitting power was increased to 200 kilowatts. In the course of the roll-out of the Geneva wave plan the transmitter got the licence to work with an output power of 600 kilowatts and the facility was renovated in the second half of the 1970s; not only were new transmitters installed, but the old radio mast was replaced by a 161-metre high guyed mast of steel tube, which is insulated against the ground. On 2 July 1991, during the Ten Day War, the station was attacked by two Yugoslav Mig-21 airplanes, and the 600-kilowatt transmitter was heavily damaged. The feeder and the radio mast of the old transmitter from the 1950s were not damaged, so there were only short interruptions in the transmission.

In 1993, the transmitter was replaced by a new 300 kW-transmitter with equal audibility and better quality of transmission. The transmitter, manufactured by Harris Corporation in Quincy, Illinois, has been in operation since 26 February 1993.

The transmitter was switched off on 4 September 2017 at 12:05.

== See also ==
- List of masts
