= Kozjak pri Ceršaku =

- Location in Slovenia
- Coordinates: 46°41′52.54″N 15°40′58.75″E
- Country: Slovenia
- Traditional region: Styria
- Statistical region: Drava
- Municipality: Šentilj

Area
  - Total: 2.2 km^{2} (0.85 sq mi)
- Elevation: 353 m (1,158 ft)

Population (2002)
  - Total: 165

Kozjak pri Ceršaku (pronounced [kɔˈzjaːk pɾi ˈtseːɾʃaku]) is a dispersed settlement in the Slovene Hills (Slovene: Slovenske gorice) above the right bank of the Mura River in the Municipality of Šentilj in northeastern Slovenia.

== Name ==
The name of the settlement was changed from Kozjak to Kozjak pri Ceršaku in 1955.
