= Konrad Kolšek =

Yugoslav/Slovene colonel general

- Born: 23 October 1933; Šibenik, Kingdom of Yugoslavia
- Died: 29 April 2009 (aged 75); Celje, Slovenia
- Military career
- Allegiance: (Socialist Federal Republic of Yugoslavia) SFR Yugoslavia
- Branch: Yugoslav People's Army
- Service years: 1974–1991
- Rank: Colonel General
- Conflicts: Slovenian Independence War

Konrad Kolšek (23 October 1933 – 29 April 2009) was a Slovenian Yugoslav People's Army Colonel General who came to prominence during the Slovenian Independence War.

== Slovenian Independence War ==
27 June 1991 is widely considered to mark the official beginning of the Slovenian Independence War (also often referred to as the Ten-Day War). Kolšek, an ethnic Slovene, chose to remain loyal to the Yugoslav People's Army instead of supporting the cause of Slovenian independence. For this, he was labeled a quisling and a traitor by the Slovenian media but was praised in what was to remain of the Yugoslav media.

== Aftermath ==
He was subsequently put into retirement in 1991 and this marked the end of his career. The Socialist Federal Republic of Yugoslavia ceased to exist in 1992 and along with it went the Yugoslav People's Army. The SFRY was succeeded by the FR Yugoslavia from which Kolšek tried to get a retirement pension but was unsuccessful. After years of struggle, he managed to get a pension from the Slovenian government. Afterwards, he had remained largely out of the public eye until his death.

Kolšek was charged by a Slovenian court in 1993 with "having served in the enemy army and acting against the Slovene constitutional decision on independence" in exercise of his command in 1991. He was cleared of the charges on grounds that "the Yugoslav People's Army at the time when Kolšek was its member, was not an enemy army" and that "one can speak of an enemy army only after 18 October 1991, when a three-month moratorium period expired for the achievement of the Slovene declaration of independence."

He died on 29 April 2009 after being diagnosed with cancer.

== Published books ==
- 1991. prvi pucnji u SFRJ: sećanja na početak oružanih sukoba
