= Zagreb Observatory =

Coordinates: 45.819°N 15.9749°E

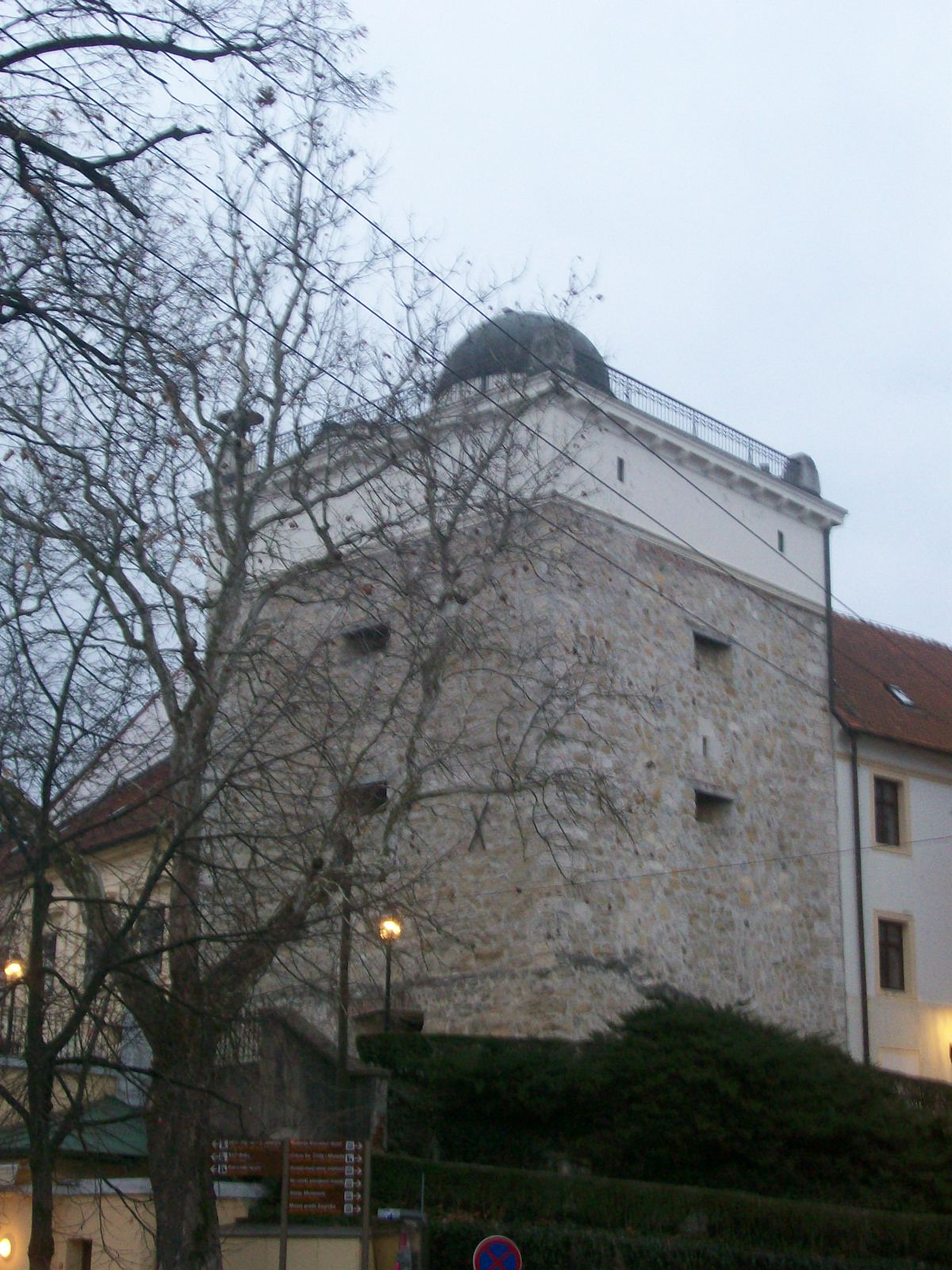
Zagreb Astronomical Observatory

The Zagreb Astronomical Observatory (Croatian: Zvjezdarnica Zagreb) is the astronomical observatory located in Zagreb, the Croatian capital, and founded in 1903. It is managed by the Zagreb Astronomical Society; its main purpose is educational.

== Equipment and location ==
The main telescope under the dome is a 175/1400 mm TMB APO refracting telescope installed in September 2007. The old Zeiss 130/1950 mm telescope has been mounted in parallel and will, after the acquisition of the needed equipment, be used to photograph the Sun in the H_{α} line. The third telescope, a Coronado PST H_{α} 40/400 mm, is installed next to the main telescope and is used for visual observation of the Sun in the H_{α} line. There are also several smaller portable telescopes (Celestron 200/2000mm, Konus refractor 80/900mm etc.) and binoculars. The photo lab makes black and white photographs.

The Observatory stands in the city center, a couple of streets away from the main city square. It is located in a tower called Popov Toranj (Priest's Tower), erected during the Tatar scare in the 13th century and formerly owned by the Archbishop of Zagreb.

It comprises the last floor of the building complex in 22 Opatička Street, with the telescope dome on a terrace. The Observatory premises include a lecture room for an audience of 50, a room for astrophotography, 5 offices, a library and a small common space.

== History ==
The Observatory was founded by the Croatian Society for Natural Sciences. The premises in Popov Toranj were provided by the city government, which gave the funds for the reconstruction and the installation of an astronomic dome and a telescope. The grand opening took place on December 5, 1903. The first manager of the Observatory was Oton Kučera, a major promoter of science in Croatia.

The international renown of the first observatory in the region was enhanced by August Kopff, an astronomer from Heidelberg. When he discovered the minor planet no. 589 in 1906, he named it "Croatia" in honor of the new observatory.

Despite Kučera's hopes, the Observatory was not used for scientific work for the lack of researchers. It has always been used primarily for popular science, which flourished in the mid-20th century, when the Esperanto editions of the Observatory spread its name around the world. The observatory was closed during World War II. The Observatory and the Croatian Astronomic Society made their greatest cultural contribution to Zagreb when they procured the planetarium in 1963. It was donated to the Technical Museum, where it is still used. The original 1903 telescope was replaced by a Zeiss-made refractor in 1966.

In the mid-1980s, the Observatory building complex was thoroughly renovated. In 1992, a new dome was installed, the equipment and activities were modernized. Today, the Observatory is a gathering point of the lovers of astronomy and natural sciences. It traditionally holds lectures, stargazing sessions, astronomic education and other activities for the citizens. Its scientific work regarding the physics of the Sun is done together with the Hvar Observatory.

== See also ==
- List of astronomical observatories
