= 589 Croatia =

Main-belt asteroid

Discovery
- Discovered by: A. Kopff
- Discovery site: Heidelberg Obs.
- Discovery date: 3 March 1906

Designations
- Pronunciation: /kroʊˈeɪʃ(i)ə/
- Named after: Croatia (part of Austria-Hungary)
- Alternative designations: 1906 TM · 1936 WM; 1947 RA · 1953 RF_{1} 1953 VR_{1} · 1953 VU; A912 HH
- Minor planet category: main-belt · (outer); Croatia

Orbital characteristics
- Epoch 4 September 2017 (JD 2458000.5)
- Uncertainty parameter 0
- Observation arc: 111.34 yr (40,666 d)
- Aphelion: 3.2583 AU
- Perihelion: 3.0205 AU
- Semi-major axis: 3.1394 AU
- Eccentricity: 0.0379
- Orbital period (sidereal): 5.56 yr (2,032 days)
- Mean anomaly: 161.92°
- Mean motion: 0° 10^{m} 37.92^{s} / day
- Inclination: 10.808°
- Longitude of ascending node: 177.60°
- Argument of perihelion: 223.88°

Physical characteristics
- Mean diameter: 84.44±22.49 km 87.54±2.5 km 87.66 km (derived); 91.75±1.30 km 93.617±1.015 km 96.491±2.300 km
- Mass: (6.3±3.0)×10^{17} kg (Note: Calculated from its standard gravitational parameter GM = 0.042±0.020 km^{3}/s^{2}.)
- Mean density: 1.47 g/cm^{3} (Note: Assuming a diameter of 93.6 km.)
- Synodic rotation period: 11.7±0.1 h (Note: Lightcurve plot of 589 Croatia, Palmer Divide Observatory, B. D. Warner (2007). Summary figures at the LCDB); 16.385±0.0931 h 24.821±0.002 h
- Geometric albedo: 0.041±0.006; 0.0419±0.0104; 0.047±0.002; 0.0509±0.003; 0.051±0.007; 0.0577 (derived); 0.06±0.06
- Spectral type: Tholen = CX · P B–V = 0.73; U–B = 0.368
- Absolute magnitude (H): 8.938±0.004 (R) · 8.99±0.26 · 9.00 · 9.1 · 9.14 · 9.18

589 Croatia, provisional designation 1906 TM, is a dark asteroid and parent body of the Croatia family, located in the outer regions of the asteroid belt, approximately 88 kilometers in diameter. It was discovered in 1906, by astronomer August Kopff at Heidelberg Observatory, and later named for the independent country of Croatia, then part of Austria-Hungary.

== Discovery ==
The asteroid was discovered on 3 March 1906, by German astronomer August Kopff at the Heidelberg-Königstuhl State Observatory in southwest Germany, with the use of the photographic method. In the moment of the discovery, the asteroid was 12.5^{mv} and was in the constellation of Virgo. The discovery was published in the Astronomische Nachrichten magazine, in the article wrote by Professor Wolf. Later, some astronomers (Johann Palisa, Karl Lohnert and some others) were making measurements for the purpose of determining the orbital elements. From these measurements P. V. Neugebauer from Berlin and M.S. Mello and Simas from Trafaria (Lisbon) had independently determined the first orbital elements. Observations had continued, and among observers there were A. Kopff, E. Bianchi, A. Abetti, G. Zappa, P. Chafardet, E. Millosevich, J. Palisa, and some others. Observations were made from Berlin, Copenhagen, Rome, Arcetra and some other Italian cities.

== Orbit and classification ==
Croatia is the parent body of the Croatia family (638), a small asteroid family of less than 100 known members. It orbits the Sun in the outer main belt at a distance of 3.0–3.3 AU once every 5 years and 7 months (2,032 days; semi-major axis of 3.14 AU). Its orbit has an eccentricity of 0.04 and an inclination of 11° with respect to the ecliptic. The body's observation arc begins at Heidelberg, sixteen days after its official discovery observation.

== Physical characteristics ==
In the Tholen classification, Croatia is ambiguous, closest to a carbonaceous C-type and somewhat similar to that of an X-type asteroid, while the Wide-field Infrared Survey Explorer (WISE) characterized it as a primitive P-type asteroid. Nesvorný determined the overall spectral type for the Croatia family to be that of an X-type.

=== Rotation period ===
In July 2013, the so-far best-rated rotational lightcurve of Croatia was obtained by astronomers Romain Montaigut, Arnaud Leroy, Raoul Behrend, René Roy, Donn Starkey, Maurice Audejean, Roberto Crippa and Federico Manzini. Lightcurve analysis gave a longer-than average rotation period of 24.821 hours with a brightness variation of 0.25 magnitude (U=2+). The result supersedes photometric observations by Brian Warner and by astronomers at the Palomar Transient Factory, which measured a shorter period of 11.7 and 16.385 hours with an amplitude of 0.16 and 0.32, respectively (U=2/2).

=== Diameter and albedo ===
According to the surveys carried out by the Infrared Astronomical Satellite IRAS, the Japanese Akari satellite and the NEOWISE mission of NASA's WISE telescope, Croatia measures between 84.44 and 96.491 kilometers in diameter and its surface has an albedo between 0.041 and 0.06.

The Collaborative Asteroid Lightcurve Link derives an albedo of 0.0577 and a diameter of 87.66 kilometers based on an absolute magnitude of 9.0. The radius of (probably) 28.452 km (and, consequently, the superficial area of 2543.2 km^{2}, and equatorial circumference of 89.385 km) were determined by use of Argelander's Method.

== Naming ==
This minor planet was named for the country of Croatia, then part of Austria-Hungary, after the suggestion made by astronomer Max Wolf. It also honors the foundation of the Astronomical Observatory of the Croatian Natural Sciences Society (Zagreb Observatory) in Zagreb.
