= Battle of Holmec =

Slovenian military action

- Part of the Ten-Day War
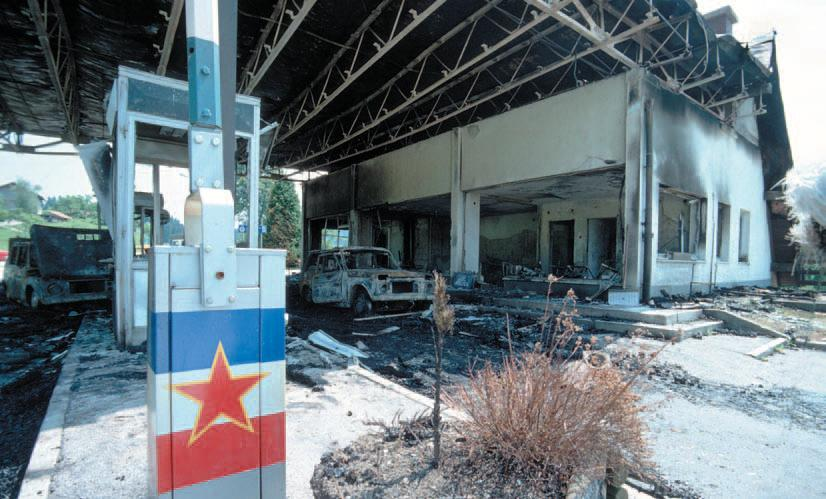
- The destroyed Holmec border crossing
Date	27 June 1991 – 28 June 1991
Location	Holmec, Slovenia
Result	Slovenian victory: Beginning of the Holmec incident

Belligerents
Slovenia	(Socialist Federal Republic of Yugoslavia) Yugoslavia

Commanders and leaders
(Slovenia) Maksimiljan Gorenšek	(Socialist Federal Republic of Yugoslavia) Rajko Meh (MIA)

Units involved
Territorial Defence; National Police	Yugoslav People's Army: Yugoslav Ground Forces

Strength
(Slovenia) 220 territorial defence (Slovenia) 40 police	(Socialist Federal Republic of Yugoslavia) 62

Casualties and losses
(Slovenia) 2 killed (Slovenia) 3 wounded	(Socialist Federal Republic of Yugoslavia) 3 killed (Socialist Federal Republic of Yugoslavia) 6 wounded (Socialist Federal Republic of Yugoslavia) 45 captured (Socialist Federal Republic of Yugoslavia) 3 surrendered

The Battle of Holmec (Slovenian: Bitka za Holmec) was one of the bloodiest clashes and had the second most soldiers involved out of all the battles in the Ten-Day War. The Yugoslav People's Army tried to take the border post of Holmec after a brief ultimatum. The units of the Slovenian Police and territorial defense stopped members of the JNA who were supposed to occupy the border crossing. 220 members of the territorial defense and 40 policemen participated, against 62 members of the JNA.

== Battle ==
The 115th Anti-Sabotage Company, 1st company of the 62nd Carinthian Detachment, 1st platoon of the 97th Assault Detachment, 160th Anti-Sabotage Platoon and the 32nd Anti-aircraft Battery of the Slovenian TO, as well as the 31st JNA corps were present at the battle. After a shootout between both sides, the Holmec watchtower fell around 10 a.m. to Slovenian TO.

== Aftermath ==
Rajko Meh, the JNA commander at the battle of Holmec, deserted to the Slovenian National Police. On the 28 June 1991, Slovenian TO members were filmed on the Austrian public broadcasting station ORF. Video footage shows a small group of six JNA soldiers standing or walking slowly with raised hands, holding up a white sheet in an apparent attempt to surrender. Moments later, gunfire is heard and the soldiers fall or jump to the ground. Holmec was the first border post in Slovenia to be liberated during the Ten-Day War. Many Slovenian high-ranking officers left the JNA after the battle.

== Notes ==
1. The Holmec incident refers to claims that three Yugoslav People's Army recruits (Goran Maletić, Zoran Ješić and Antonijo Šimunović) surrendered as prisoners of war and were shot and killed by the Slovenian Territorial Defence. However, investigations by Slovenian state prosecutors in 1991 and 1999 concluded that there were no suspicions of criminal acts during the fighting in Holmec.
