= Kaniža, Šentilj =

Kaniža
- Location in Slovenia
- Coordinates: 46°38′55.37″N 15°40′5.72″E
- Country: Slovenia
- Traditional region: Styria
- Statistical region: Drava
- Municipality: Šentilj

Area
  - Total: 1.22 km^{2} (0.47 sq mi)
- Elevation: 315.5 m (1,035 ft)

Population (2002)
  - Total: 203

Kaniža (pronounced [kaˈniːʒa], German: Kanischa) is a settlement in the Slovene Hills (Slovene: Slovenske gorice) in the Municipality of Šentilj in northeastern Slovenia.

There is a restaurant and a bar located here. There are four bus stops along 437 in Kaniža. Two services are Lestako Tim - Spletna trgovina in druga zaključna gradbena dela, Miodrag Kostić s.p., and Servis pihal in Trobil Andrej Robnik s.p.
