= Cmurek Castle =

Castle in Trate, Slovenia

Coordinates: 46.7055°N 15.7868°E

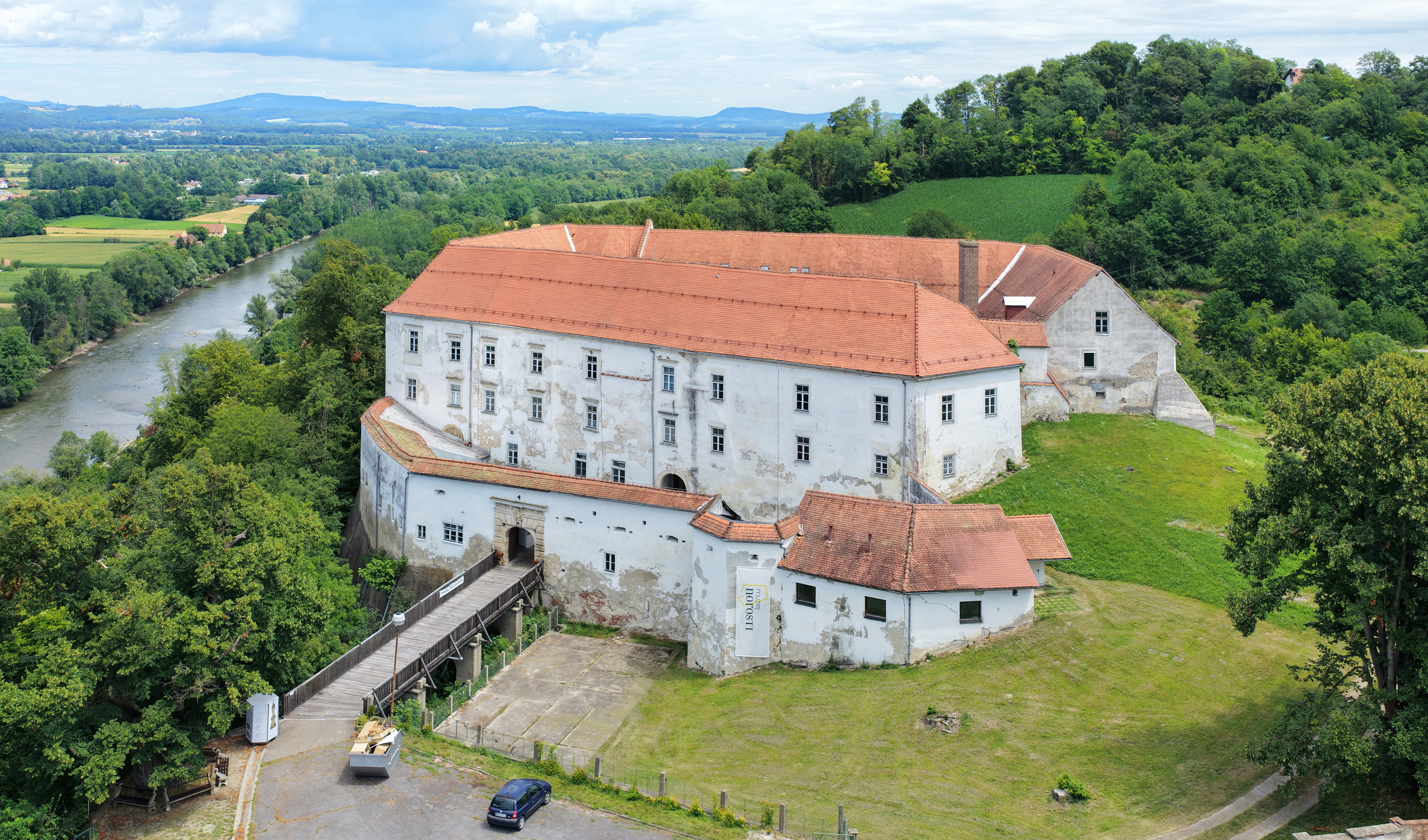
Cmurek Castle

Cmurek Castle (Slovene: grad Cmurek) is a castle in Trate, Slovenia. It stands on a steep cliff above the bridge over the Mura River at Trate, the international border crossing to the Austrian village of Mureck.

== History ==
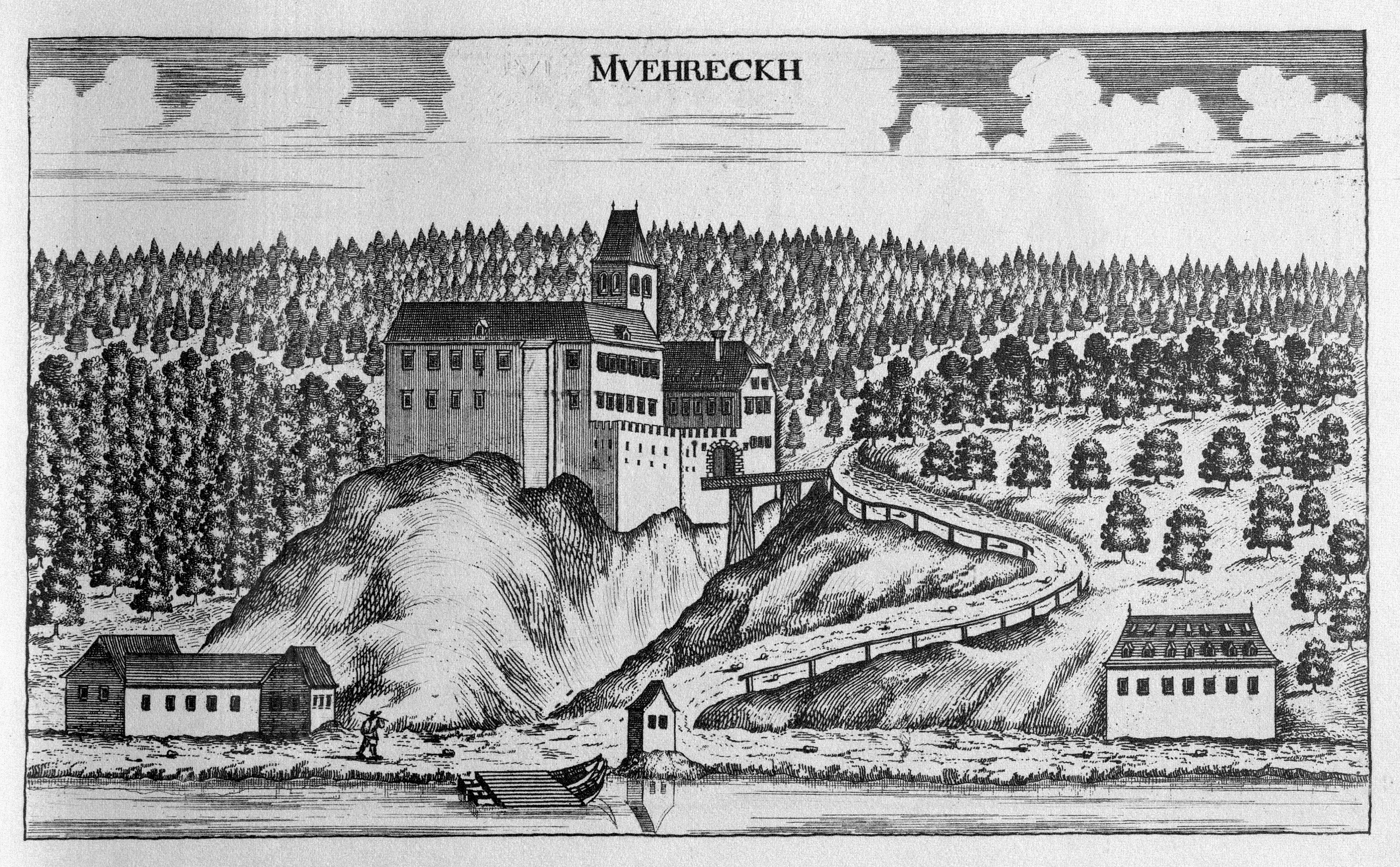
Cmurek Castle, Georg Matthäus Vischer, Topographia Ducatus Stiriae, Gradec 1681

The castle was built in the first half of the 12th century by the lords of Cmurek. Burkhard de Morekke was first mentioned in old records in 1148. In 1174 Reinbert of Cmurek was the chief chamberlain (procurator) at the court of the Styrian Border Count Ottokar IV. After the original owners died out in 1245, the manor and the castle were inherited by the von Traungaus, ministerial lords of Traungau. The castle itself was mentioned in sources only in 1299 as Hovs Murek. In 1386, Cmurek was bought by the Counts of Celje (Herman II and William), and in 1401 Count Herman of Celje sold it to his brother-in-law Hans Lord of Stubenberg. The Lords of Stubenberg owned it until 1931, when it was bought by Anton Mali, the castle's caretaker until then.

The castle is still Romanesque in its irregular layout, with a Renaissance arcaded courtyard and peripheral residential tracts in the core, although 16th-century alterations have considerably obliterated the original architectural designs. In the 18th century a multi-storey Romanesque tower was demolished.

After the Second World War, the castle was first converted into a home for the disabled in 1949, then into a home for the mentally defective in 1956, later renamed the Institute for the Mentally and Nervously Ill. It operated until 2004, and it is thought to have housed between 200 and 400 people at any one time.

== Museum ==
Since 2014, the Museum of Madness has been housed in its premises, with the aim of preserving the history of the castle and the Institute for the Mentally and Nervously Ill. The Museum of Madness houses several exhibitions about the Mura River, along which the castle was built, the history and the building development of Cmurek Castle, and the history of life and work in the total institution.

The castle is the venue for many events, including the Seviqc Early Music Festival in the past. The Amazon of Europe Bike Trail passes by the castle.
