= Dolga Brda =

- Location in Slovenia
- Coordinates: 46°33′53.13″N 14°51′23.5″E
- Country: Slovenia
- Traditional region: Carinthia
- Statistical region: Carinthia
- Municipality: Prevalje

Area
  - Total: 5.91 km^{2} (2.28 sq mi)
- Elevation: 535.9 m (1,758 ft)

Population (2002)
  - Total: 296

Dolga Brda (pronounced [ˈdoːu̯ɡa ˈbəɾda]) is a dispersed settlement in the hills northwest of Prevalje in the Carinthia region in northern Slovenia, right on the border with Austria. The Holmec international border crossing is located in Dolga Brda. A battle was fought here during the 1991 Ten-Day War.
