= Ceršak =

- Location in Slovenia
- Coordinates: 46°41′55.11″N 15°40′7.94″E
- Country: Slovenia
- Traditional region: Styria
- Statistical region: Drava
- Municipality: Šentilj

Area
  - Total: 3.81 km^{2} (1.47 sq mi)
- Elevation: 309.3 m (1,015 ft)

Population (2002)
  - Total: 693

Ceršak (pronounced [ˈtsɛːɾʃak] or [ˈtseːɾʃak]) is a settlement above the right bank of the Mura River in the Municipality of Šentilj in northeastern Slovenia, right next to the border with Austria.

There is a small chapel in the centre of the settlement. It was built in the 19th century.
