= Šomat =

- Location in Slovenia
- Coordinates: 46°39′47.11″N 15°44′39.68″E
- Country: Slovenia
- Traditional region: Styria
- Statistical region: Drava
- Municipality: Šentilj

Area
  - Total: 2.25 km^{2} (0.87 sq mi)
- Elevation: 345.8 m (1,135 ft)

Population (2002)
  - Total: 191

Šomat (pronounced [ˈʃoːmat], in older sources Šambert, German: Schönwarth) is a settlement in the Slovene Hills (Slovene: Slovenske gorice) in the Municipality of Šentilj in northeastern Slovenia.
