= Trate =

- Location in Slovenia
- Coordinates: 46°42′4.68″N 15°47′15.99″E
- Country: Slovenia
- Traditional region: Styria
- Statistical region: Drava
- Municipality: Šentilj

Area
  - Total: 4.47 km^{2} (1.73 sq mi)
- Elevation: 336.3 m (1,103 ft)

Population (2002)
  - Total: 322

Trate (pronounced [ˈtɾaːtɛ]) is a settlement in the Slovene Hills (Slovene: Slovenske gorice) in the Municipality of Šentilj in northeastern Slovenia.

Cmurek Castle is an originally 12th-century castle built on a hill above the Mura River in the northern part of the settlement. It was extended and rebuilt at various times in the 16th, 17th, and late 18th centuries. It is a three-story building with an internal arcaded courtyard.
