= Jurjevski Dol =

- Location in Slovenia
- Coordinates: 46°38′18.18″N 15°45′57.46″E
- Country: Slovenia
- Traditional region: Styria
- Statistical region: Drava
- Municipality: Šentilj

Area
  - Total: 0.99 km^{2} (0.38 sq mi)
- Elevation: 273.3 m (897 ft)

Population (2002)
  - Total: 66

Jurjevski Dol (pronounced [ˈjuːɾjɛu̯ski ˈdoːl]) is a dispersed settlement in the Slovene Hills (Slovene: Slovenske gorice) in northeastern Slovenia. It belongs to the Municipality of Šentilj.
