= Stevan Popov =

Yugoslav Airlines pilot

- Stevan Popov at the controls of "Kikaš" in 1994
- Born: Stevan Popov; 12 June 1947; Izbište, Yugoslavia
- Died: 3 June 2015 (aged 67); Ruma, Serbia
- Known for: Pilot

Stevan Popov (Serbo-Croatian Cyrillic: Стеван Попов; 12 June 1947 - 3 June 2015) was a Yugoslav Airlines pilot and reserve Yugoslav army officer. Popov is best known for his role in evacuating civilians from Sarajevo in 1992 during the Bosnian war, and subsequently evacuating the Yugoslav football team from Sweden.

== Early life ==
Popov was born in the family of a teacher in Izbište in Yugoslavia in 1947. He became a pilot for Yugoslav airlines (JAT) and a reserve officer in the Yugoslav military.

== Break-up of Yugoslavia ==
=== Evacuation of Sarajevo ===
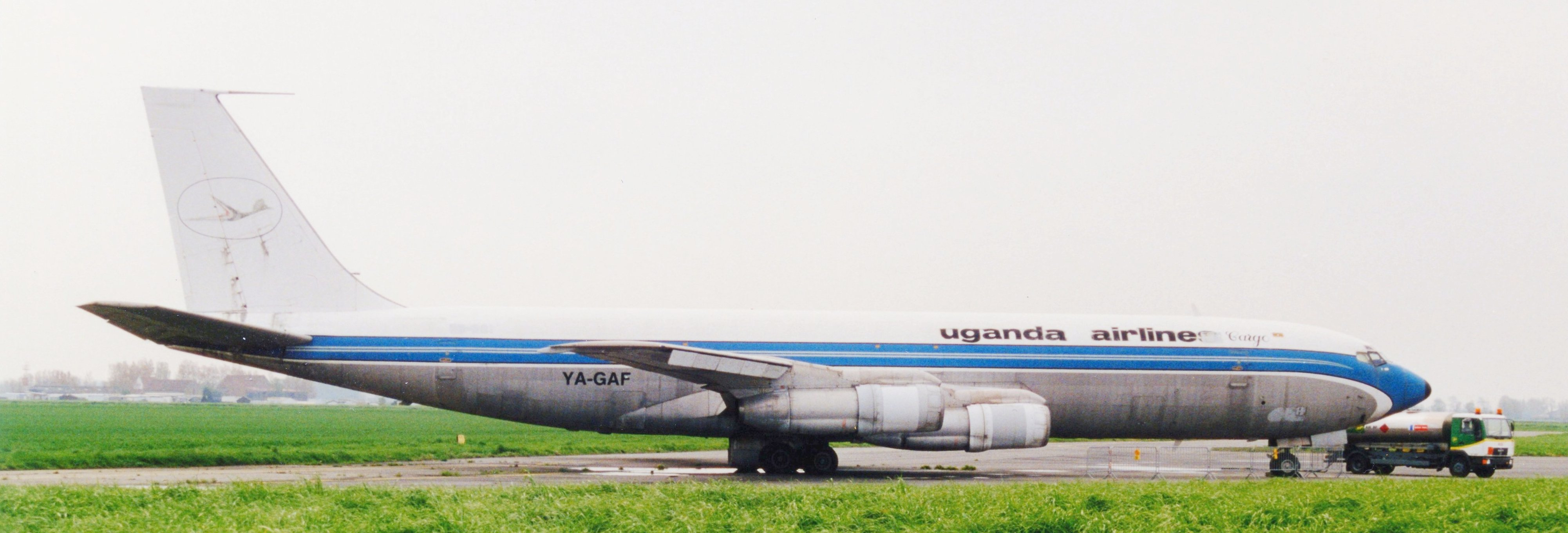
"Kikaš" at Ostend airport in 2001

During the Bosnian war, between 17 April and 3 May 1992, Popov, flying the Boeing 707 freight aircraft "Kikaš" (so-called because it had been seized from the Croatian-Canadian businessman Anton Kikaš when he attempted to smuggle arms to Croatia in it) successfully evacuated about 40,000 people from Sarajevo airport during fighting in and around the city. In total - 49,000 refugees were rescued from the "Sarajevo hell."

Each flight between Sarajevo, Bosnia, and Batajnica, Serbia (near Belgrade) took on average between 12 and 15 minutes. Popov did not switch off the engines during these flights, and carried as many as 585 people in each flight, which could take large numbers as "Kikaš", being a freight aircraft, did not have seats.

49,000 people in all were evacuated aboard "Kikaš" by Popov and other aircrew between 12 April and 3 May 1992 from Sarajevo. 4,000 refugees were transported on 2 May alone by Popov in 16 separate flights.

=== Evacuation of Yugoslav football team ===
On 30 May 1992, following the outbreak of fighting in Yugoslavia, and numerous atrocities including the mortaring of a market-place in Sarajevo on 27 May 1992, UN resolution 757 sanctioning Yugoslavia was passed. The resolution included a ban on Yugoslav teams being hosted in international sporting events, and a ban on international flights to and from Yugoslavia other than humanitarian flights. At the time the Yugoslav team was in Sweden preparing for the start of Euro '92, having arrived on 28 May 1992.

Popov therefore piloted the JAT flight that went to collect the Yugoslav team, arriving on 2 June 1992. Popov claimed in an interview that initially he had not been given permission to fly to Stockholm, but he had personally been in radio contact with UN Secretary General Boutros Boutros-Ghali who had given him a 24-hour window to evacuate the Yugoslav team. Upon arrival at Arlanda airport near Stockholm, Popov found that he could not refuel his aircraft as the British company BP refused to refuel it due to sanctions. Popov proposed to fly the aircraft, which had half-full tanks, and land on a Romanian highway. Zlatan Kikic, the Yugoslav ambassador to Sweden who was due to fly back to Yugoslavia with embassy staff on the same flight, then raised $2000 in cash and paid the Norwegian state petroleum company Statoil (now Equinor) to refuel the aircraft. Popov then flew the aircraft with the Yugoslav football team and embassy staff back to Belgrade, arriving shortly before the end of his 24-hour window for completing the flight.

Popov was subsequently invited onto the pitch at Belgrade's Marakana stadium and hailed by the fans for this flight. He also received Novosti's "Noble feat of the year" award for 1992 for this exploit and his exploits in Bosnia. Popov's life was the subject of the 1994 book Prostranstvo, plavo: Popov Steva (The Expanse, Blue: Popov Steva) written by the Serb journalist Miroslav Stefanović.

== Personal life ==
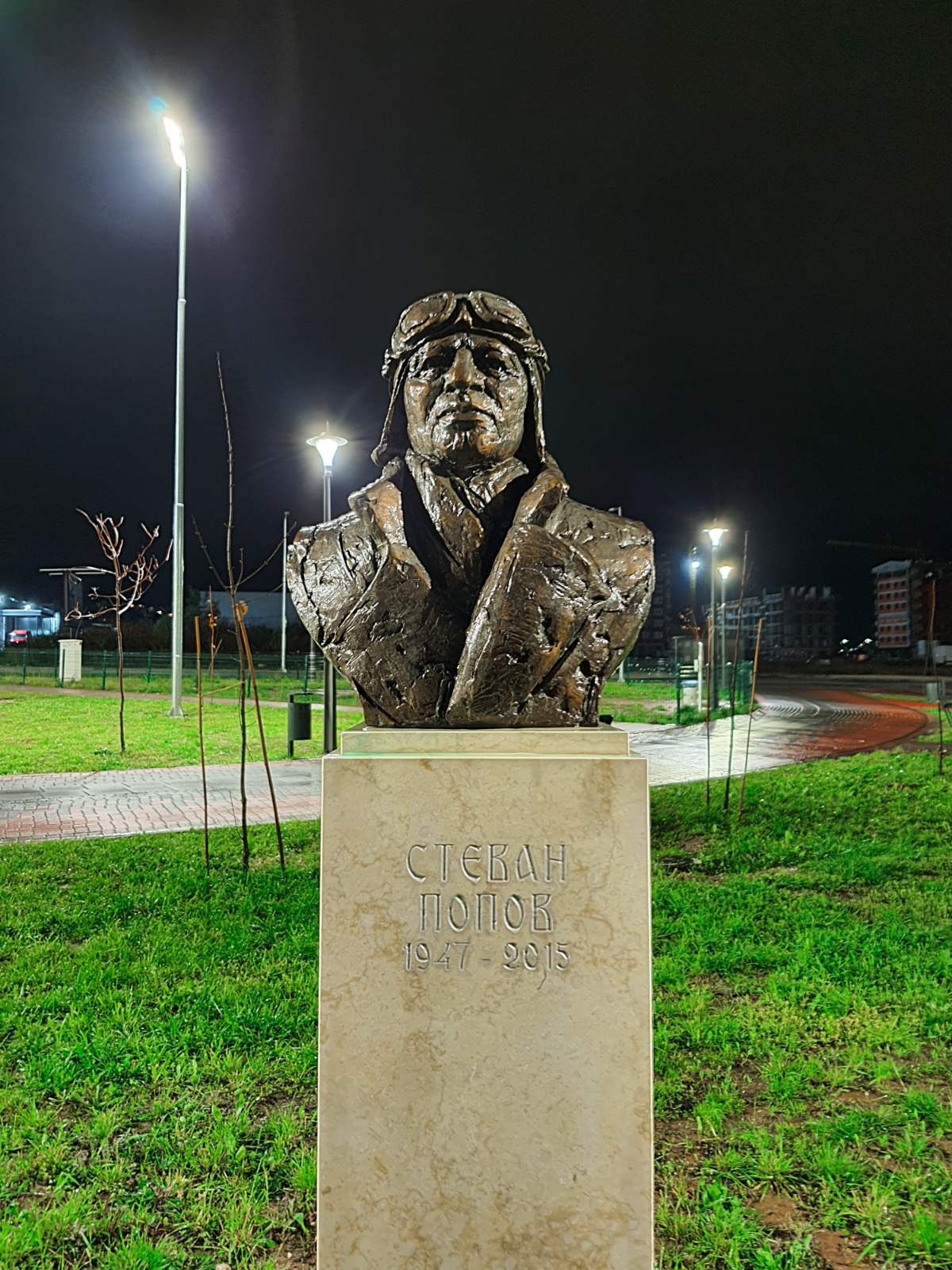
Bust of Popov in Istočno Sarajevo

Popov had three children with his first wife, Dušica. He was subsequently married to Snezana Jovanovic Popov, a former member of the Serbian national basketball team, with whom he had a daughter.

Popov was made redundant from JAT in 2004. He suffered from cancer in his right kidney, and survived a subsequent operation to remove his kidney. Popov worked to develop Novi Sad Airport (also known as Čenej Airport). He committed suicide by gunshot on 3 June 2015 at home in Ruma, Serbia, the reason for his suicide is unknown. His funeral was held in Novi Sad on 6 June 2015.
