= Spodnja Velka =

- Location in Slovenia
- Coordinates: 46°39′45.59″N 15°46′49.98″E
- Country: Slovenia
- Traditional region: Styria
- Statistical region: Drava
- Municipality: Šentilj

Area
  - Total: 6.29 km^{2} (2.43 sq mi)
- Elevation: 351.7 m (1,154 ft)

Population (2002)
  - Total: 425

Spodnja Velka (pronounced [ˈspoːdnja ˈʋeːlka], German: Unterwölling) is a settlement in the Slovene Hills (Slovene: Slovenske gorice) in the Municipality of Šentilj in northeastern Slovenia.

== Name ==
The name Spodnja Velka literally means 'lower Velka', contrasting with neighboring Zgornja Velka (literally, 'upper Velka'), which lies about 50 meters (160 ft) higher in elevation. The two settlements were attested in written sources as Welich in 1319, Welik in 1324, and Weliken in 1360. The toponym is derived from a hydronym, *Velika (voda/reka) 'big (creek/river)', referring to Velka Creek, a left tributary of the Pesnica River.
