= Selnica ob Muri =

- Location in Slovenia
- Coordinates: 46°41′9.27″N 15°41′30.68″E
- Country: Slovenia
- Traditional region: Styria
- Statistical region: Drava
- Municipality: Šentilj

Area
  - Total: 7.5 km^{2} (2.9 sq mi)
- Elevation: 264.9 m (869 ft)

Population (2002)
  - Total: 1,077

Selnica ob Muri (pronounced [ˈséːwnitsa ɔp ˈmuːɾi]) is a settlement in the Slovene Hills (Slovene: Slovenske gorice), east of Šentilj v Slovenskih Goricah in the Municipality of Šentilj in northeastern Slovenia.
