= Zgornje Gradišče =

- Location in Slovenia
- Coordinates: 46°40′10.64″N 15°44′56.95″E
- Country: Slovenia
- Traditional region: Styria
- Statistical region: Drava
- Municipality: Šentilj

Area
  - Total: 1.67 km^{2} (0.64 sq mi)
- Elevation: 309.8 m (1,016 ft)

Population (2002)
  - Total: 158

Zgornje Gradišče (pronounced [ˈzɡoːɾnjɛ ɡɾaˈdiːʃtʃɛ]) is a dispersed settlement in the Slovene Hills (Slovene: Slovenske gorice) in the Municipality of Šentilj in northeastern Slovenia.
