= Štrihovec =

- Location in Slovenia
- Coordinates: 46°39′45.26″N 15°40′3.04″E
- Country: Slovenia
- Traditional region: Styria
- Statistical region: Drava
- Municipality: Šentilj

Area
  - Total: 1.8 km^{2} (0.69 sq mi)
- Elevation: 374.7 m (1,229 ft)

Population (2002)
  - Total: 333

Štrihovec (pronounced [ˈʃtɾiːxɔʋəts]) is a settlement in the Slovene Hills (Slovene: Slovenske gorice) in the Municipality of Šentilj in northeastern Slovenia.
