= Municipality of Šentilj =

Municipality of Slovenia

Municipality of Šentilj Občina Šentilj
- Municipality
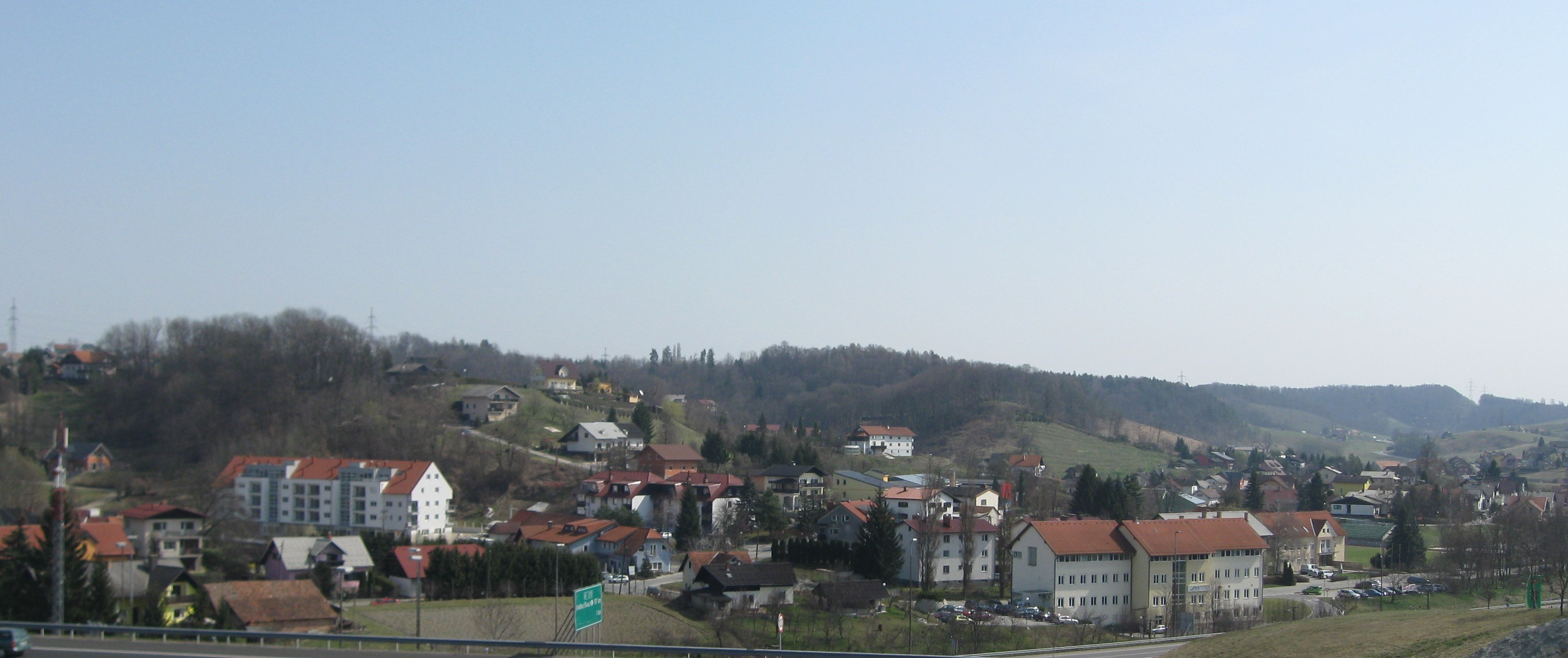

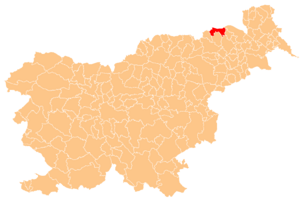
- Location of the Municipality of Šentilj in Slovenia
- Coordinates: 46°41′N 15°39′E
- Country: Slovenia

Government
  - Mayor: Štefan Žvab

Area
  - Total: 65.01 km^{2} (25.10 sq mi)

Population (July 1, 2018)
  - Total: 8,452
  - Density: 130.0/km^{2} (336.7/sq mi)
- Time zone: UTC+01 (CET)
  - Summer (DST): UTC+02 (CEST)
- Website: www.sentilj.si

The Municipality of Šentilj (pronounced [ʃɛnˈtiːl] or [ʃənˈtiːl]; Slovene: Občina Šentilj) is a municipality in Slovenia. The seat of the municipality is the town of Šentilj v Slovenskih Goricah. Šentilj became a municipality in 1994. It borders Austria.

== Settlements ==
In addition to the municipal seat of Šentilj v Slovenskih Goricah, the municipality also includes the following settlements:

- Ceršak
- Cirknica
- Jurjevski Dol
- Kaniža
- Kozjak pri Ceršaku
- Kresnica
- Plodršnica
- Selnica ob Muri
- Sladki Vrh
- Šomat
- Spodnja Velka
- Srebotje
- Stara Gora pri Šentilju
- Štrihovec
- Svečane
- Trate
- Vranji Vrh
- Zgornja Velka
- Zgornje Dobrenje
- Zgornje Gradišče
- Zgornji Dražen Vrh
