= Faculty of Geodesy, University of Zagreb =

Faculty at University of Zagreb for geodesy

Coordinates: 45°48′28.6″N 15°57′47.9″E

Faculty of Geodesy
- Geodetski fakultet
- Type: Public
- Established: 1962
- Administrative staff: 80
- Students: 700
- Location: Zagreb, Croatia
- Website: http://www.geof.hr/

The Faculty of Geodesy at the University of Zagreb (Croatian: Geodetski fakultet Sveučilišta u Zagrebu) is the only Croatian institution providing high education in Geomatics engineering and the largest faculty in this domain in southeastern Europe.

== Education ==
Since the implementation of the Bologna process in the academic year 2005/06, Faculty of Geodesy offers one undergraduate programme (three years):

- Geodesy and Geoinformatics

which finishes with the title Bachelor of Science in Geodesy and Geoinformatics. After receiving the B.Sc. degree, the student can apply for the Master's degree in two programmes (two years):

- Geodesy
- Geoinformatics

which ends with the title Master of Science in Geodesy or Master of Science in Geoinformatics.

The Faculty offers also two postgraduate programmes:

- PhD (three years)
- spec. (one year)

== Organisation ==
The Faculty comprises 16 departments:

- Chair of State survey
- Chair of Geoinformation Science
- Chair of Hydrography
- Chair of Mathematics and Physics
- Chair of Analysis and processing of geodetic measurements
- Chair of Satellite geodesy
- Chair of Photogrammetry and Remote sensing
- Chair for Geoinformation
- Chair of Cartography
- Chair of Instrumental technology
- Chair of Engineering Geodesy
- Chair for Theory of Organisation and Management
- Chair of Spatial Information Management
- Chair of Land Surveying
- Laboratory of Measuring and Measuring technology
- Hvar Observatory

== Students ==
Students are organised in their student association (Croatian: Studentski zbor) and are participating in few sport activities. Also, they issue the professional magazine Ekscentar.

== Noted alumni ==
- Stjepan Horvat, Rector of University of Zagreb (1944–1945)
- Slavko Macarol, Rector of University of Zagreb (1963–1966)
