= Sladki Vrh =

- Location in Slovenia
- Coordinates: 46°41′44.89″N 15°44′7.89″E
- Country: Slovenia
- Traditional region: Styria
- Statistical region: Drava
- Municipality: Šentilj

Area
  - Total: 2.13 km^{2} (0.82 sq mi)
- Elevation: 252.1 m (827 ft)

Population (2002)
  - Total: 864

Sladki Vrh (pronounced [ˈslaːtki ˈʋəɾx], German: Süssenberg) is a rural settlement in the Municipality of Šentilj in northeastern Slovenia, on the Austrian border. The main part of the settlement is concentrated on the right bank of the Mura River with the remainder dispersed in the Slovene Hills (Slovene: Slovenske gorice) to the south. A tissue paper manufacturer, Paloma, operates in the settlement.
