= Šentilj v Slovenskih Goricah =

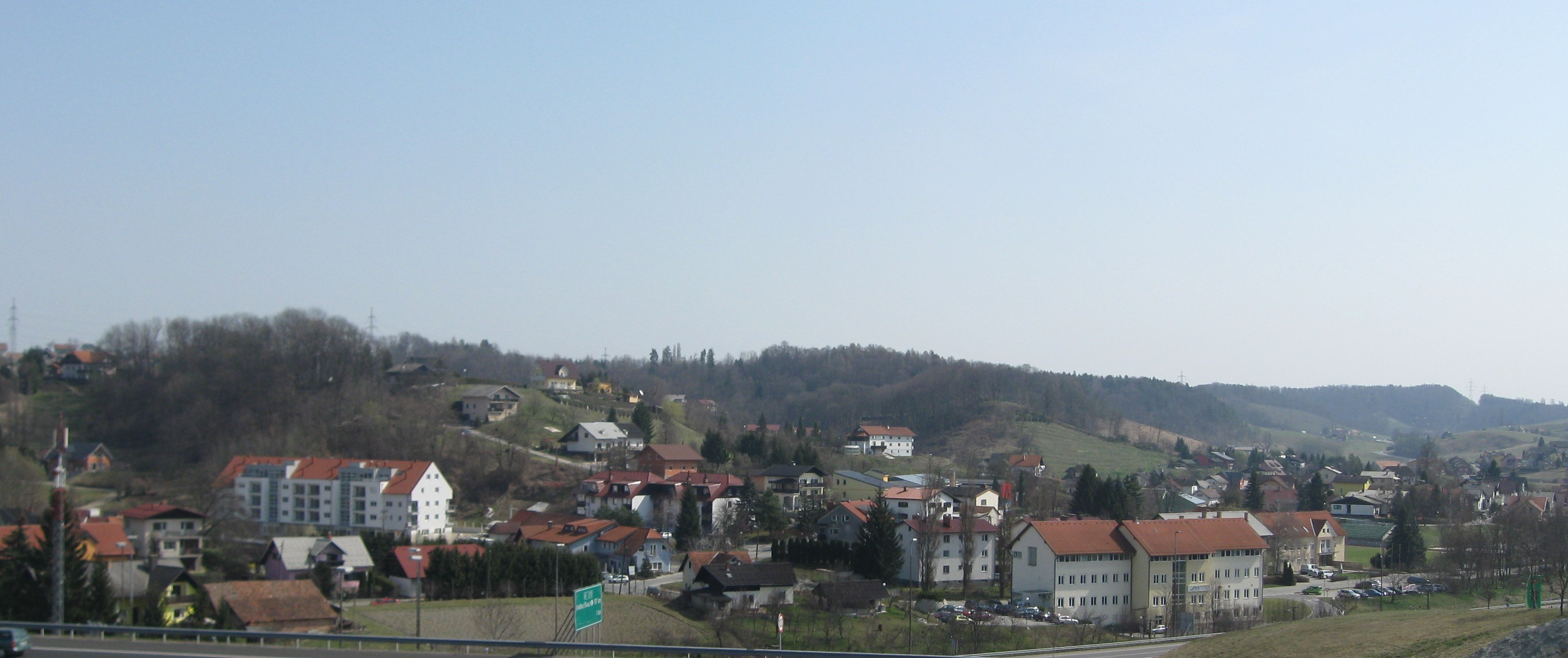

- Location in Slovenia
- Coordinates: 46°40′35.68″N 15°39′26.02″E
- Country: Slovenia
- Traditional region: Styria
- Statistical region: Drava
- Municipality: Šentilj

Area
  - Total: 6.62 km^{2} (2.56 sq mi)
- Elevation: 292 m (958 ft)

Population (2002)
  - Total: 1,378

Šentilj v Slovenskih Goricah (pronounced [ʃɛnˈtiːl ʍ slɔˈʋeːnskiɣ ɡɔˈɾiːtsax] or [ʃənˈtiːl ʍ slɔˈʋeːnskiɣ ɡɔˈɾiːtsax]; Slovene: Šentilj v Slovenskih goricah, in older sources Sveti Ilj v Slovenskih Goricah, German: Sct. Egidi in Windischbüheln) is a town and the administrative seat of the Municipality of Šentilj in northeastern Slovenia. This town was an Austria-Slovenia border crossing checkpoint until December 21, 2007, when all immigration and customs checks ended after Slovenia joined the Schengen Area. The Austrian town opposite Šentilj is Spielfeld.

The parish church, from which the settlement also gets its name, is dedicated to Saint Giles. It was first mentioned in written documents dating to 1329. In 1532 it was looted by Ottoman Turks. It became an independent parish in 1784 and the current building was built in 1806 in a cruciform plan with a tall belfry.
