= First ladies and gentlemen of Slovenia =

First Gentleman of Slovenia
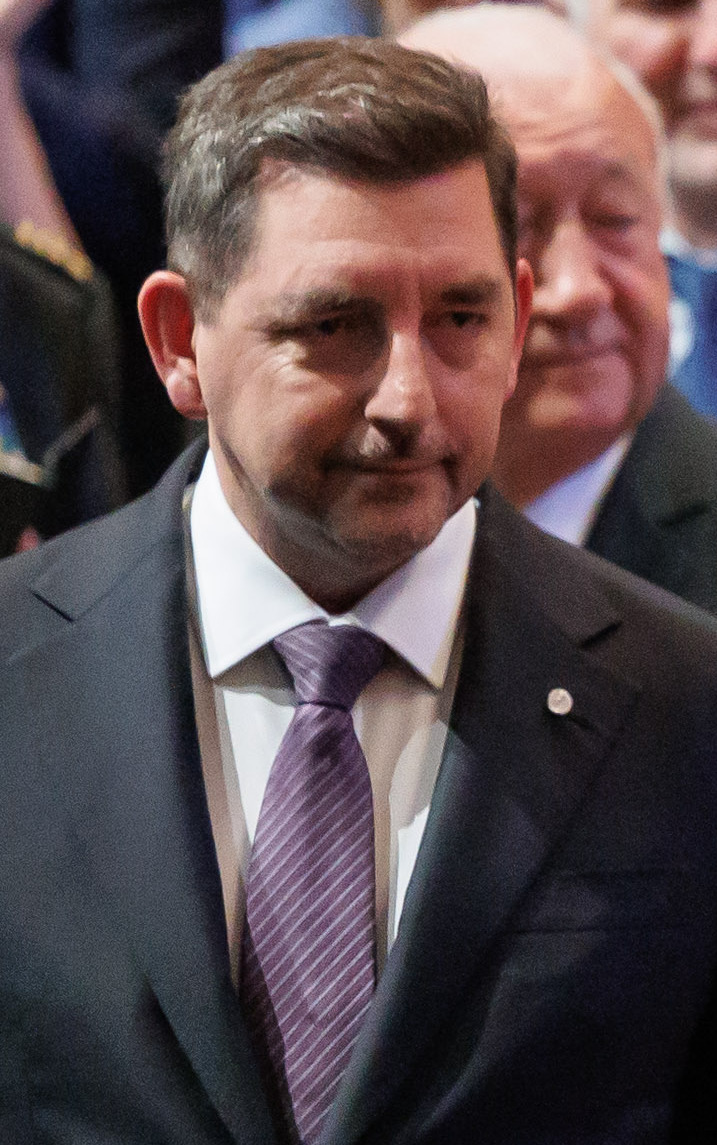
- Incumbent; Aleš Musar since December 22, 2022
- Inaugural holder: Štefka Kučan
- Formation: December 23, 1991

First Gentleman (Slovene: Prvi gospod) or First Lady (Slovene: Prva dama) of Slovenia is the title attributed to the husband, wife, or domestic partner of the president of Slovenia.

There has been one first gentleman of Slovenia so far – Aleš Musar, whose wife is President Nataša Pirc Musar since 22 December 2022.

== Benefits ==
By law, the spouses or domestic partners of the president of Slovenia, known as the First Lady or First Gentleman, have equal rights and obligations within the position, whether they are married to the president or not. This equality was codified by an amendment to the Marriage and Family Relations Act, which stipulates that marriage and cohabitation are considered equal by the government.

The spouse or partner of the president of Slovenia is entitled to paid leave from work for official functions and other responsibilities. The first lady (or first gentleman) receives an official monthly allowance of 15 percent of the President's salary, (the equivalent of about 890.73 euros in 2017), from the government to cover the cost of these obligations.

The first lady may also elect to leave her employer during the duration of their term in office. In this case, she is entitled to an official monthly allowance of 20 percent of the president's salary.

In January 2013, First Lady Tanja Pečar, the partner of President Borut Pahor, announced that she would renounce her financial privileges as first lady and refrain from receiving a monthly allowance. Instead, Pečar chose to remain an active lawyer during her tenure, while still performing the protocols and social obligations that are required of the first lady.

== List of first ladies and gentlemen ==
Name	Portrait	Term Began	Term Ended	President of Slovenia	Notes
Štefka Kučan		December 23, 1991	December 22, 2002	Milan Kučan	Inaugural First Lady of Slovenia
Position vacant		December 22, 2002	December 23, 2007	Janez Drnovšek	President Janez Drnovšek and his former wife, Majda Drnovšek, divorced during the 1980s. There was no first lady during his presidency.
Barbara Miklič Türk		December 23, 2007	December 22, 2012	Danilo Türk	
Tanja Pečar		December 22, 2012	December 22, 2022	Borut Pahor	Pečar, a lawyer by profession, is the partner of President Pahor.
Aleš Musar		December 22, 2022	Incumbent	Nataša Pirc Musar	The first ever First Gentleman.
