= 2011 Slovenian YouTube incident =

2011 publication of 3 closed session videos of the Slovenian government on YouTube

The 2011 Slovenian YouTube incident was the publication of three clips of the recordings of closed sessions of the Government of Slovenia on the video-sharing website YouTube on 3 December 2011. The clips were published under the title Stari obrazi (Old Faces) by someone who signed himself as stariobrazi (oldfaces). The publication happened during the term of the Prime Minister Borut Pahor, just before the early 2011 Slovenian parliamentary election on 4 December.

The first of the clips published was dated to 31 January 2008, when Janez Janša was the Prime Minister. The second and the third clip was dated to 23 April 2009, respectively 23 April and 30 April 2009, when Borut Pahor was the Prime Minister. The original recordings were produced in audio and video. They were stored on DVDs and locked in a safe available only to authorised personnel. They were also available at home to three people via the Spectiva remote viewing software, but due to their low quality, the probability of Spectiva being the source of the leaked data has been estimated as low, and it was not used during the term of Pahor's government. Spectiva could be misused until July 2009. It seems most probable that the recordings originated from the recording room or were transferred with additional equipment from the press room of the government; till 2009, sessions were broadcast live there so that extracts of resolutions could be made by the authorised personnel.

Marjan Miklavčič, an expert in intelligence services and a lecturer at the University of Maribor, compared the publication to WikiLeaks. He particularly stressed that it was not known which data had been stolen and whether they could be used for extortion. Iztok Prezelj, who lectures on intelligence at the University of Ljubljana, stated that the publication showed a parallel state to exist in Slovenia. Miklavčič confirmed that all the data publicly available indicate the thesis about a parallel state to be correct.

== Content ==
The ministers of Janša's government, Andrej Vizjak and Mojca Kucler Dolinar, were discussing the wages of judges. The recordings of Pahor's sessions showed the Foreign Minister Samuel Žbogar reporting about the pressures from the European Union on Slovenia regarding the Slovenian blockade of Croatian entry to the Union and the Interior Minister Katarina Kresal discussing the acquisition of water cannons for the Slovenian Police.

== Investigation ==
On 9 December, it was reported that the Slovenian Police had started investigation about the clips. On 14 December, the Government spokesperson Darijan Košir explained that in 2006, government areas were renovated. He said that the recorded sessions were held at Gregorčič Street 20 (Gregorčičeva ulica 20; Government and Presidential Palace) and the recording room was at Gregorčič Street 25. The buildings were connected with 200 metres (660 feet) of cable. The system could be abused at several points. The works at Gregorčič Street 25 were carried out by the construction company SCT, and the computer infrastructure was set up by the companies ADM and TSE. Košir told that all the people with access to the data were thoroughly checked. On 12 December, after the Secretariat filed a criminal complaint, the Police requested an internal report from the Secretary-General Kamnar.

On 15 December, TSE denied having spotted any anomalies in the computer system since it had been installed. They told that all their employees were checked and that they never received any instruction that would allow for an illegal access. They also pointed out that the Government was responsible for the security of the system after it had been taken over. The telephone number of ADM was unavailable. Rumors about a slow investigation due to long preparation of report by the Secretary-General appeared. Both the minister of interior and the Secretary-General denied this.

On 11 January 2012, an inspectional surveillance, ordered by the Information Commissioner Nataša Pirc Musar, was carried out by the Inspectorate for Protection of Personal Data at the Secretary–General. As of 27 January 2012, the findings were not available yet. The results will influence the decision of the Government about the destruction of the original session recordings.

On 26 January 2012, the Secretariat-General of the Government issued a report about an internal investigation that failed to find the perpetrator. However, it was found out that the clips were carefully chosen and taken out of context, giving them a different meaning than they would have in the whole. They were alienated after they had been processed in the recording room. This significantly narrowed the number of supply locations and the circle of possible suspects. The highest risk was associated with the human factor. The Secretariat–General identified the crimes of betrayal of secrets, misuse of position, unauthorized image recording, and an information system attack. Due to lack of jurisdiction of the Government, further investigation would be carried out by the police.

On 27 January 2012, Helena Kamnar, the Secretary-General of the Government, unofficially told for media that three people had access to the Spectiva remote viewing software, and could also watch the sessions from their home. Kamnar also explained that it was possible to find out who had access in which period but had no information due to the police having confiscated one of the computers. On 28 January 2012, she told that according to the information she had received from the person who allocated the right to use the system, the three people were Janez Janša, the former Secretary-General Božo Predalič, and the former Secretary-General Milan M. Cvikl. They only had the possibility to use it in their respective terms. Predalič told that he used it perhaps twice, because he was present at Janša's sessions and did not have the option to use it during Pahor's sessions. Cvikl told that he refused to use it as it seemed redundant to him and due to security reasons even demanded it to be uninstalled.

The confiscated computers were returned to the Secretary-General on 31 January 2012. The next morning, Kamnar found the doors of the secretary open and reasoned that someone had broken in. Nothing was stolen. The Government officially denied any evidence that a criminal act had happened. There were guesses whether the two events could be related, but Kamnar decided there would be no investigation, as the possibility of it being successful was slim and she was to be replaced by the new government. Since February 2012, the government is again led by Janša, and the Secretary-General is again Predalič.

On 27 March 2012, the information commissioner reported that the measures for the safeguarding of the recordings were inadequate. Although the places where the recording device was situated and the recordings were kept were guarded, there were no revision marks on them, which would enable the tracing of their production, usage, viewing and processing. The law on the protection of personal data was not broken.

In September 2012, the pre-trial procedure had not been completed yet by the police.

== Response by the Government ==
On 7 December, the Secretary-General of the Government filed a criminal complaint against the unknown perpetrator and notified about the incident the Criminal Police Directorate and the Office for the Protection of Classified Information. On 8 December, the Slovenian government demanded the removal of the clips from YouTube. On 9 December in the evening, when the publication was reported for the first time by media, there were three clips remaining of the allegedly original five although none had been removed by the host. YouTube had removed the clips on 15 December 2011, after a copyright-related demand by the Slovenian Computer Emergency Response Team (SI–CERT). However, on the same day they appeared again, albeit shorter. They were removed again in less than 24 hours. The clips were republished by users who downloaded them after they have been found by media. The original perpetrator as well as the uploaders were unknown. The decision about the destruction of the original governmental recordings has not been made yet, pending the results of an inspectional surveillance. After the incident, the recordings were not produced until 26 January. Since then, they have been made only in audio and have been destroyed immediately after extracts had been made. They are not transmitted via cable to another building anymore. In April 2012, the deputy of the Secretary-General stated that the affair cannot repeat itself, because the government had implemented the traceability of users of governmental session video recordings.

== Previous leakages ==
A tone clip of a closed government session was inadvertently leaked to the website of the Government already on 2 July 2009. It showed Katarina Kresal, the former Minister of the Interior, and Irma Pavlinič Krebs, the former Minister of Public Administration, in a wrangle about the number of the policemen in Slovenia, and had a large echo in the public. Krebs later commented: "I didn't know that our areas have ears."

== See also ==
- Black Cube#Pre-election leaks in Slovenia
