= Kucan =

Kucan or Kučan is a surname. Notable people with the surname include:

- Daniel Kucan (born 1970), American television personality
- Joseph D. Kucan, American video game developer and actor
- Milan Kučan (born 1941), Slovene politician
- Štefka Kučan (born 1943), Slovene public figure
- Tamara Kučan (born 1989), Serbian author
