= Tanja Pečar =

Slovenian lawyer (born 1964)

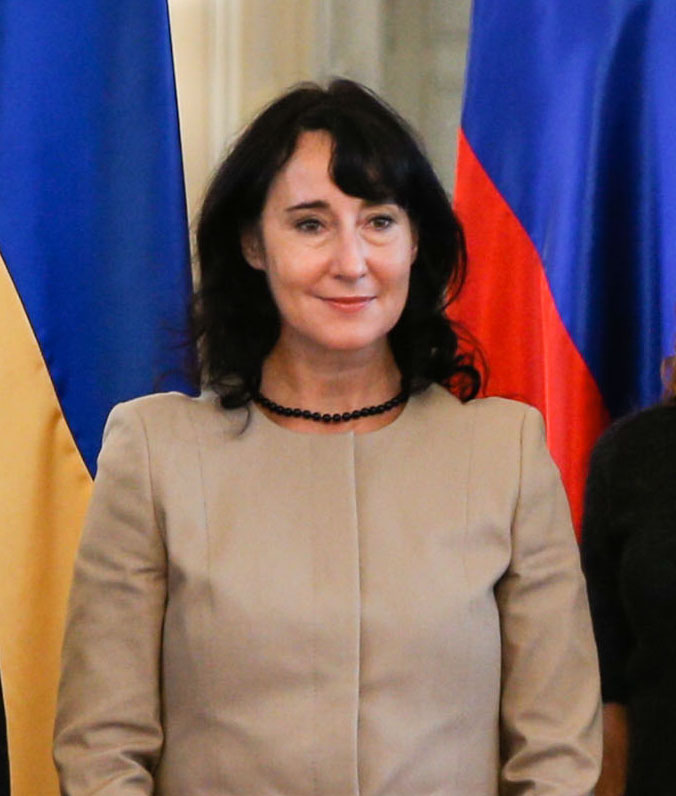
- Pečar in 2016

First Lady of Slovenia
- In office 22 December 2012 – 22 December 2022
- President: Borut Pahor
- Preceded by: Barbara Miklič Türk
- Succeeded by: Aleš Musar (As First Gentleman)

Personal details
- Domestic partner: Borut Pahor
- Children: 1
- Profession: Lawyer

Tanja Pečar (born 1964) is a Slovenian lawyer who was the first lady of Slovenia from 2012 to 2022, as the partner of Slovenia's president Borut Pahor.

== Biography ==
Tanja Pečar studied civil law at the University of Ljubljana's Faculty of Law, from which she graduated in 1988. She has practiced law as a lawyer since 1991.

Tanja Pečar is the partner of Borut Pahor and is not married to the president. She is the country's first First Lady to be the domestic partner, rather than the wife, of the president. Together, Tanja Pečar and Borut Pahor have one son, Luka. The couple live in separate residences.

Pečar became First Lady of Slovenia on 22 December 2012, when Borut Pahor was inaugurated as president. In January 2013, Pečar announced that she would renounce the financial privileges afforded the first lady, including an official government monthly allowance. Instead, she would continue to actively practice law as a lawyer while simultaneously serving as Slovenia's first lady.

In an interview with the Slovenian magazine, Obrazi, published on 14 July 2016, Pečar explained that she wanted to keep her law career separate and distinct from her duties as first lady, telling the magazine, "I only have one career as a lawyer. I do everything related to Borut's obligations because it's nice, or because it's necessary. As a rule, the two are connected. But this [the office of first lady] is not my career."

Tanja Pečar has been active throughout Pahor's early political career, but became more active at official protocol events since he was elected president. She has appeared in national celebrations, meetings with world leaders, politicians, and other dignitaries, and hosted women's programs at the President's office in Ljubljana.
