= List of international presidential trips made by Stevo Pendarovski =

This is a list of state visits made by Stevo Pendarovski, the President of North Macedonia from May 2019 to May 2024.

== List of State Visits ==
Date	Country	Cities visited	Note
June 24–25, 2019	Germany	Berlin	Official State Visit
July 15–16, 2019	Slovenia	Ljubljana	Official State Visit
October 11, 2019	Austria	Vienna	Official State Visit
October 26, 2019	Albania	Tirana	Official State Visit
November 22–23, 2019	Serbia	Belgrade, Novi Sad	Official State Visit
February 4, 2020	Poland	Warsaw	Official State Visit

== State visits hosted in North Macedonia by Stevo Pendarovski ==
Country	Name	Title	Date
Bulgaria	Boyko Borisov	Prime Minister of Bulgaria	August 1, 2019
Serbia	Ana Brnabić	Prime Minister of Serbia	August 26, 2019
Montenegro	Milo Đukanović	President of Montenegro	October 2–3, 2019
United States	Mike Pompeo	United States Secretary of State	October 4, 2019
Slovenia	Borut Pahor	President of Slovenia	September 25–26, 2020
Bulgaria	Rumen Radev	President of Bulgaria	May 26, 2021
European Union	Ursula von der Leyen	President of the European Commission	September 28, 2021
Netherlands	Mark Rutte	Prime Minister of the Netherlands	November 10, 2021
Poland	Andrzej Duda	President of Poland	November 19, 2021
Albania	Ilir Meta	President of Albania	January 11, 2022
Montenegro	Milo Đukanović	President of Montenegro	June 15–17, 2022
Croatia	Zoran Milanović	President of Croatia	June 15–17, 2022
Kosovo	Vjosa Osmani	President of Kosovo	June 15–17, 2022
Slovenia	Borut Pahor	President of Slovenia	June 15–17, 2022
European Union	Charles Michel	President of the European Council	June 15–17, 2022
Finland	Sanna Marin	Prime Minister of Finland	June 20, 2022
European Union	Ursula von der Leyen	President of the European Commission	July 14, 2022
