= Štefka Kučan =

Slovenian public figure and First Lady

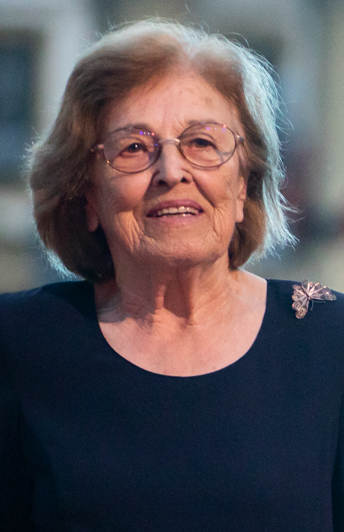
- Kučan in 2022

First Lady of Slovenia
- In role 23 December 1991 – 22 December 2002
- President: Milan Kučan
- Preceded by: Position created
- Succeeded by: Barbara Miklič Türk (2007)

Personal details
- Born: 1943 (age 82–83)
- Spouse: Milan Kučan (m. 1964)
- Children: Two daughters

Štefka Kučan (born 1943) is a Slovenian public figure who served as the inaugural First Lady of Slovenia from 1991, when the country achieved independence, until 2002. She is married to Slovenia's first president, Milan Kučan.

== Biography ==
Kučan was born into the Korosica family in Carinthia, a traditional region of northern Slovenia. She was raised in both Slovenj Gradec and nearby Šmartno. She met her husband, Milan Kučan, as a student in Ljubljana. The couple married in 1964 and had two daughters, Ana Kučan, a landscape architect and professor at the University of Ljubljana, and Špela, an anthropologist and ethnologist.

During her tenure as Slovenia's first First Lady, Kučan sponsored charities and other organizations. In 1998, she participated in the country's first roundtable discussion on the issue of same-sex marriage in Slovenia.

In 2002, Kučan was honored as "Slovene of the Year" by Jana magazine, beating fifteen other nominees for the annual award.

Kučan survived cancer in the 1990s and underwent successful cancer surgery again in 2012.
