= 1997 Slovenian presidential election =

- 23 November 1997
- Turnout: 68.65%
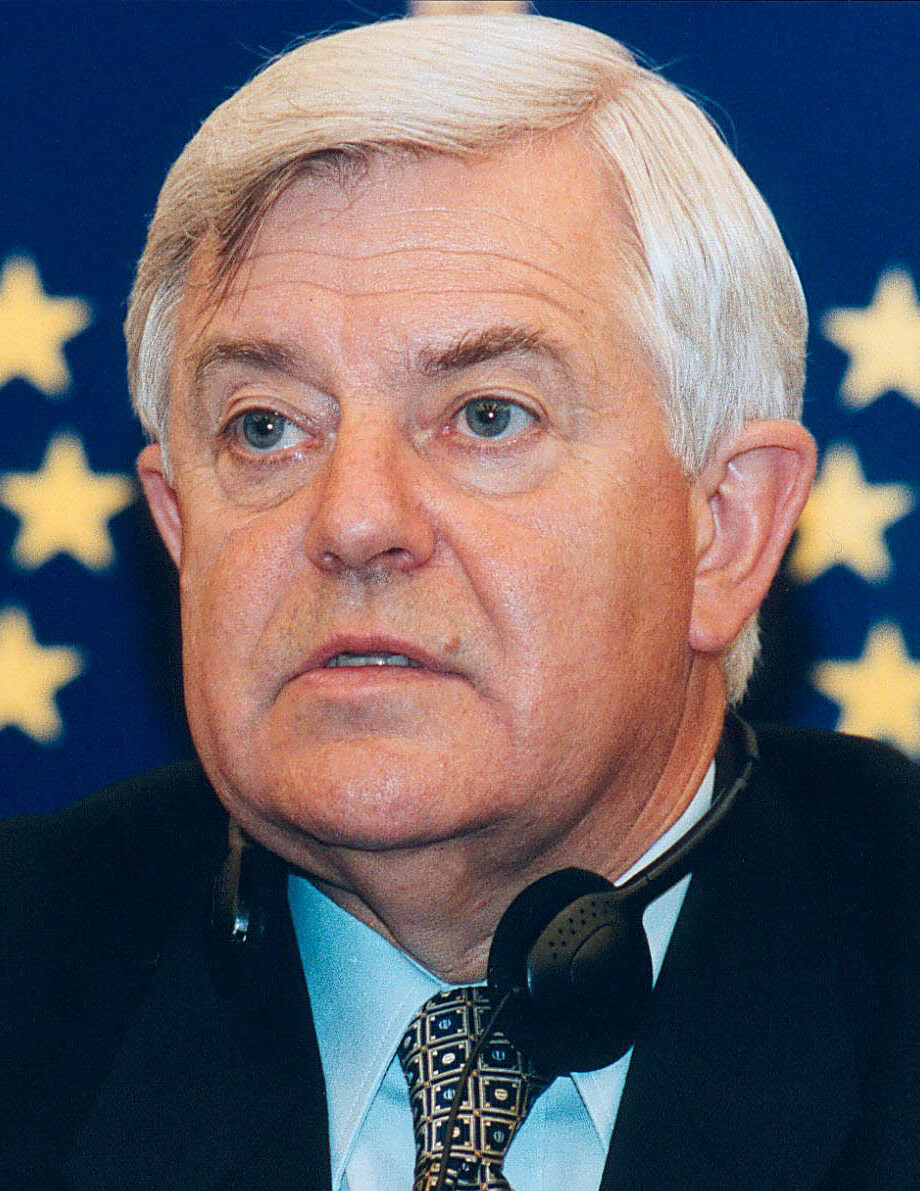

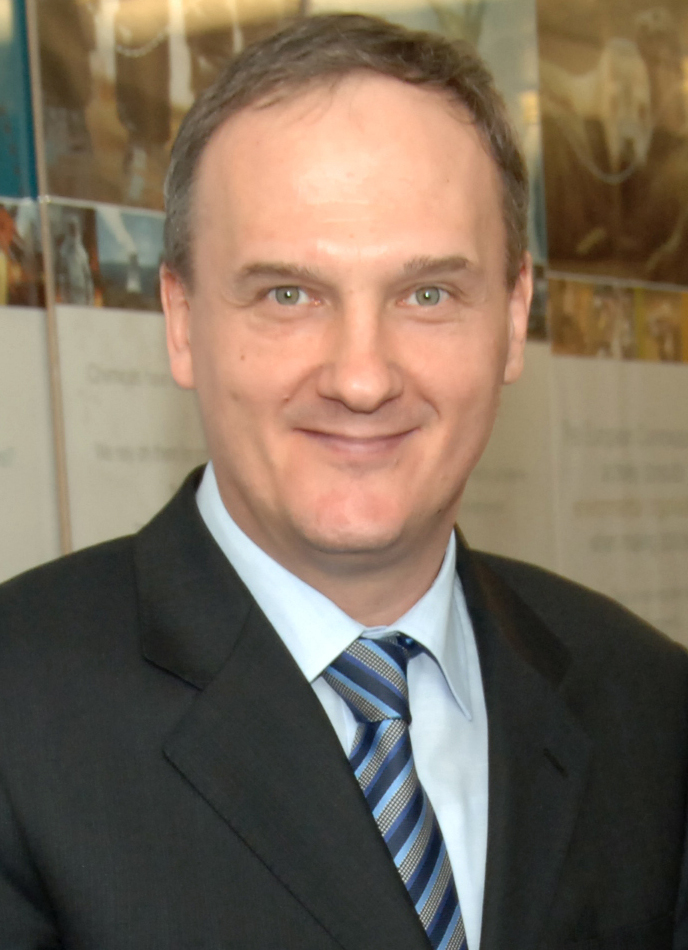
Nominee	Milan Kučan	Janez Podobnik
Party	Independent	SLS
Popular vote	578,925	191,645
Percentage	55.54%	18.39%
President before election
Milan Kučan
Independent
Elected President
Milan Kučan
Independent

Presidential elections were held in Slovenia on 23 November 1997. The result was a victory for incumbent Milan Kučan, who won 55.54% of the vote. Voter turnout was 68.65%.

== Results ==
Candidate	Party	Votes	%
Milan Kučan	Independent	578,925	55.54
Janez Podobnik	Slovenian People's Party	191,645	18.39
Jozef Bernik	SDSS–SKD	98,996	9.50
Marjan Cerar	Independent	73,439	7.05
Marjan Poljsak	National Labour Party	33,477	3.21
Anton Persak	Democratic Party of Slovenia	32,039	3.07
Bogomir Kovac	Liberal Democracy of Slovenia	28,110	2.70
Franc Miklavcic	Christian-Social Union	5,713	0.55
Total		1,042,344	100.00
Valid votes		1,042,344	97.92
Invalid/blank votes		22,102	2.08
Total votes		1,064,446	100.00
Registered voters/turnout		1,550,592	68.65
Source: European Elections Database
