= Barbara Miklič Türk =

Slovene First Lady

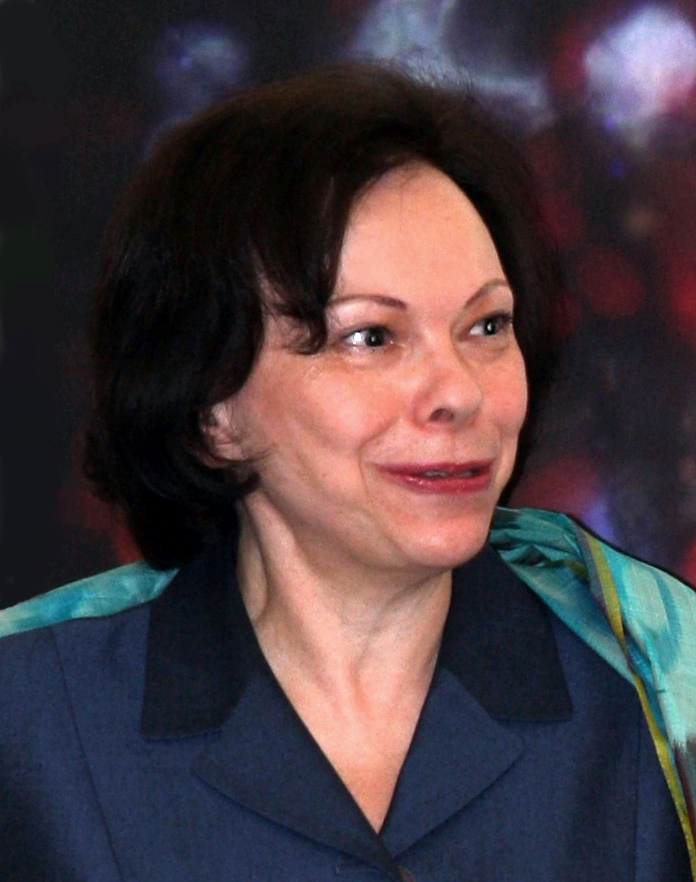
- Miklič Türk in 2009

First Lady of Slovenia
- In role 23 December 2007 – 22 December 2012
- President: Danilo Türk
- Preceded by: Vacant (2002–2007)
- Succeeded by: Tanja Pečar

Personal details
- Born: Barbara Miklič; 1948 (age 76–77)

Barbara Miklič Türk (née Miklič, born 1948) is a Slovenian politician, who was First Lady of Slovenia from 2007 to 2012, when her husband Danilo Türk was President.

== Personal life ==
Miklič was born in 1948 in Ljubljana, Socialist Republic of Slovenia (now the capital of the Republic of Slovenia). Her father was a miner and geophysical engineer, and her mother was a microbiologist. During her teenage years, she lived with her family in Sudan, and went to a Catholic school there. In 1975, she met Danilo Türk whilst working as a librarian at the United Nations. The couple married a year later, and have a daughter, Helen.

== Political career ==
In 2006, Barbara's husband Danilo became the third President of the Republic of Slovenia, and as such, Barbara Miklič Türk became the First Lady. Speaking in 2010, Miklič Türk said that the role was less well-defined than the First Lady of the United States, and mostly consisted of accompanying her husband on state business.

In 2008, Miklič Türk attended the first state visit of Queen Elizabeth II since Slovenia's independence from Yugoslavia in 1991. During the visit, she spoke with them about non-governmental organisations. In 2010, Miklič Türk hosted a conference for Finnish volunteer organisations in the fields of health and social care. In 2011, she attended the opening of the Harpa concert hall in Reykjavík, Iceland. During a state visit from the Emir of Qatar, Miklič Türk prepared a visit for the First Lady of Qatar to the University of Ljubljana to meet the rector and discuss inter-nation co-operation.
