= Nataša Pirc Musar =

President of Slovenia since 2022

Her Excellency Nataša Pirc Musar
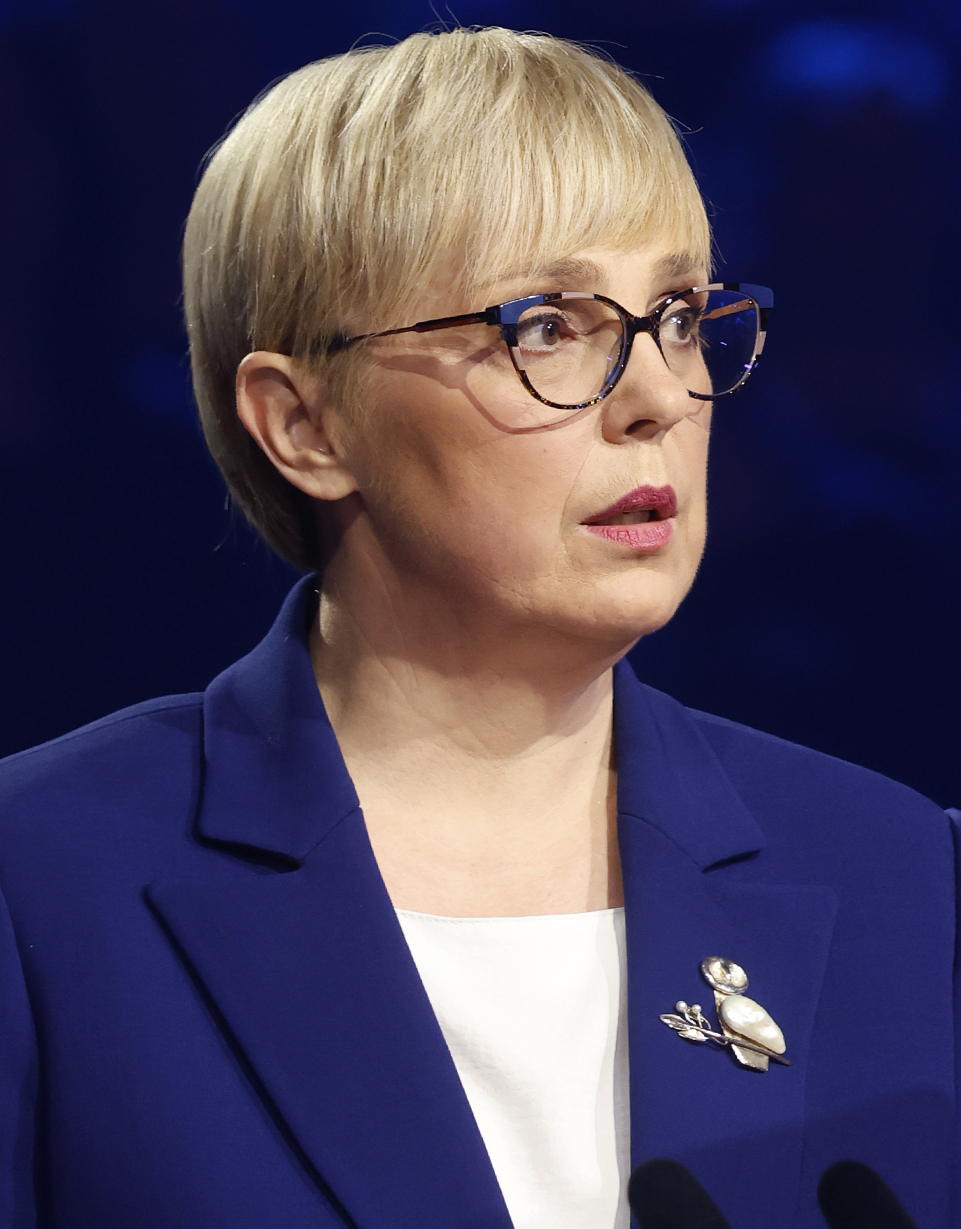
- Pirc Musar in 2026

5th President of Slovenia
- Incumbent
- Assumed office December 23, 2022
- Prime Minister: Robert Golob; Janez Janša
- Preceded by: Borut Pahor

1st Information Commissioner
- In office July 17, 2004 – July 16, 2014
- Preceded by: Office established
- Succeeded by: Mojca Prelesnik

Personal details
- Born: Nataša Pirc; May 9, 1968 (age 58) Ljubljana, SR Slovenia, SFR Yugoslavia
- Party: Independent
- Spouse: Aleš Musar
- Children: 1
- Education: University of Ljubljana; University of Vienna

Nataša Pirc Musar (née Pirc; born May 9, 1968) is a Slovenian lawyer, author, and politician who has served as the President of Slovenia since December 2022. She is the first woman to hold the office in the country's history.

Prior to her presidency, Pirc Musar served as Slovenia's Information Commissioner from 2004 to 2014, where she became widely recognized for defending freedom of information and privacy law. She later founded her own law firm, representing a number of high-profile clients, including Slovenian-born First Lady of the United States Melania Trump and members of the Slovenian Social Democrats. From 2015 to 2016, she also served as president of the Slovenian Red Cross.

Politically, Pirc Musar is considered an independent and liberal-leaning figure who emphasizes human rights, the rule of law, transparency, and strong democratic institutions. Although not formally affiliated with a political party, she has received support from several centre-left and pro-European groups.

In the second round of the 2022 presidential election, she defeated Anže Logar of the Slovenian Democratic Party and was elected President of Slovenia.

== Early life and education ==
Born in Ljubljana, Pirc Musar attended Poljane Grammar School, and later studied law at the University of Ljubljana's Faculty of Law until 1992, where Marko Ilešič, later a judge at the European Court of Justice, was her supervisor. In 1997, she passed the bar exam, and later started working at the Radio-Television Slovenia, where she worked for six years as a journalist and host of the central news program. Later, for five years, she was the presenter of the central news program 24UR on the commercial television channel POP TV. In 2001, she became the head of the corporate communication department at Aktiva Group, where her husband Aleš Musar worked.

Pirc Musar completed additional training at CNN in Atlanta, Georgia. She then continued her studies for two semesters at the University of Salford in England, during which she did internships at the BBC, Granada TV, Sky News, Reuters TV, and Border TV. In 2015 she obtained a PhD at the University of Vienna's Faculty of Law with a dissertation on a fair balance between privacy rights and the freedom of information.

== Legal and business career ==
In April 2003, Pirc Musar joined the Supreme Court of Slovenia as director of the Center for Education and Information. Pirc Musar is best remembered for being the Commissioner for Access to Public Information between 2004 and 2014. From March 2011, she was also the vice-president of the Joint Supervisory Body for Europol, and from 2012 until the end of her term as information commissioner, she was the president of this body of the European Union.

On April 7, 2014, the RTV Slovenia Programming Council selected her as Director-General. However, due to procedural issues and subsequent legal disputes, her appointment was annulled. The annulment was later ruled unlawful by a higher court in 2016. She eventually reached a settlement with RTV Slovenia in 2017 and received €70,000 in compensation.

After the end of her term as information commissioner, she founded her own law firm. Rosana Lemut Strle, became a partner in the law firm in 2016, and the Law Firm is now called Pirc Musar & Lemut Strle. Among others she represented Melania Trump, during her husband's US presidency. In highly publicized cases she represented politicians of the Social Democrats, the ambassador to the United States Stanislav Vidovič, among others.

Between 2010 and 2021, Pirc Musar was voted among the top ten most influential lawyers in the country numerous times. She co-founded the OnaVe association to connect female experts and promote knowledge. From 2015 to 2016, she was the president of the Slovenian Red Cross.

Pirc Musar has authored or co-authored at least six books on freedom of information and privacy in Slovenian, English, and Croatian.

== Political career ==
=== President of Slovenia ===
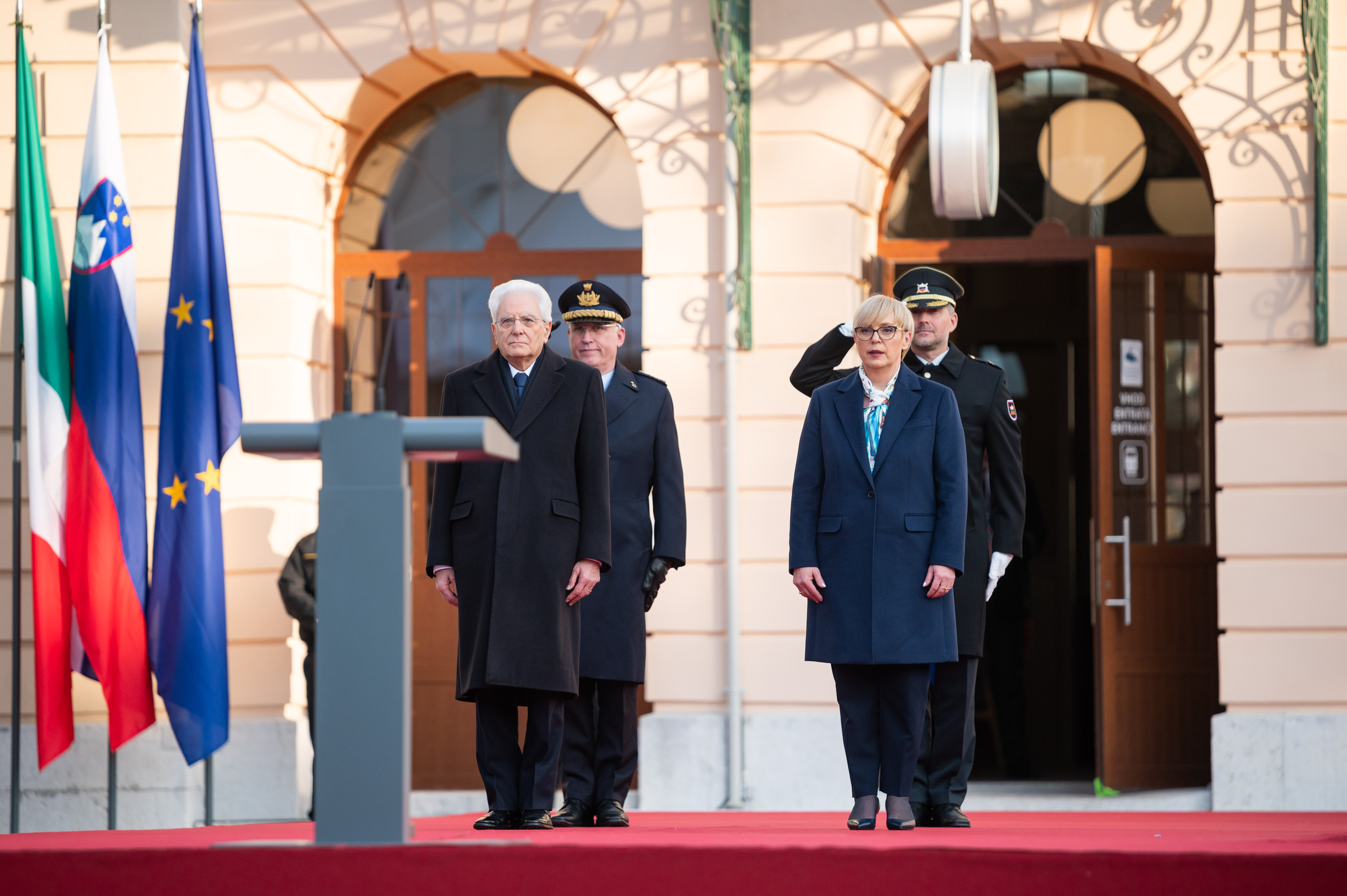
Musar and Italian President Sergio Mattarella in February 2025

On June 23, 2022, Pirc Musar announced her candidacy for President of Slovenia in the 2022 Slovenian presidential election, scheduled for October 23, 2022, as an independent candidate. She was the first to announce her candidacy for president, and she was endorsed by former presidents of Slovenia Milan Kučan and Danilo Türk. Pirc Musar has not been a member of a political party, and she does not plan to become one. She initially stated she did not expect support from right-wing parties and did not want support from The Left party, but later clarified that her statement had been taken out of context and that she would not reject support from any party. While she defended her candidacy as an independent, parties such as the Pirate Party and Youth Party – European Greens also supported her.

Her candidacy sparked media speculation about her relationship with Marta Kos, vice president of the ruling party Freedom Movement, who announced her own candidacy for president a little later. Pirc Musar and Kos claimed to be friends, but according to media reports they stopped communicating with each other. In September 2022, Kos withdrew her candidacy, which led to a surge in support for Pirc Musar, who was already leading. In October, she came second in the first round of the presidential elections, therefore becoming one of the two contenders in the run-off of the presidential elections in November 2022. In the second round of November 13, Pirc Musar defeated Slovenian Democratic Party candidate Anže Logar and was elected Slovenia's first female president.

In September 2025, Musar criticized world powers and permanent members of the Security Council (Russia, China, the United States, France, and the United Kingdom) for only pursuing their narrow national interests and offering "terror, conflict, pollution, fear, inequalities and war" instead of defending peace. She also called for an end to the genocide in Gaza, saying, "We did not stop the Holocaust, we did not stop the genocide in Rwanda, we did not stop the genocide in Srebrenica. We must stop the genocide in Gaza. There are no excuses any more, none!"

== Personal life ==
Pirc Musar is married to Aleš Musar, a businessman. They have a son, Maks (born 2001). They live in Radomlje in a villa built in 1933.

Her husband is the owner of a property known as the "Russian dacha" in Zgornje Gameljne.

She owns an extensive collection of owl related memorabilia and trinkets that amass roughly 2500 pieces

== Honors ==
- Greece: Grand Cross of the Order of the Redeemer (April 8, 2024)
- Italy: Knight Grand Cross with Collar of the Order of Merit of the Italian Republic (February 7, 2025)
- Portugal: Grand Collar of the Order of Prince Henry (March 18, 2025)

Political offices
Preceded by Borut Pahor	President of Slovenia; 2022–present	Incumbent
