= Janez Stanovnik =

Slovenian politician (1922–2020)

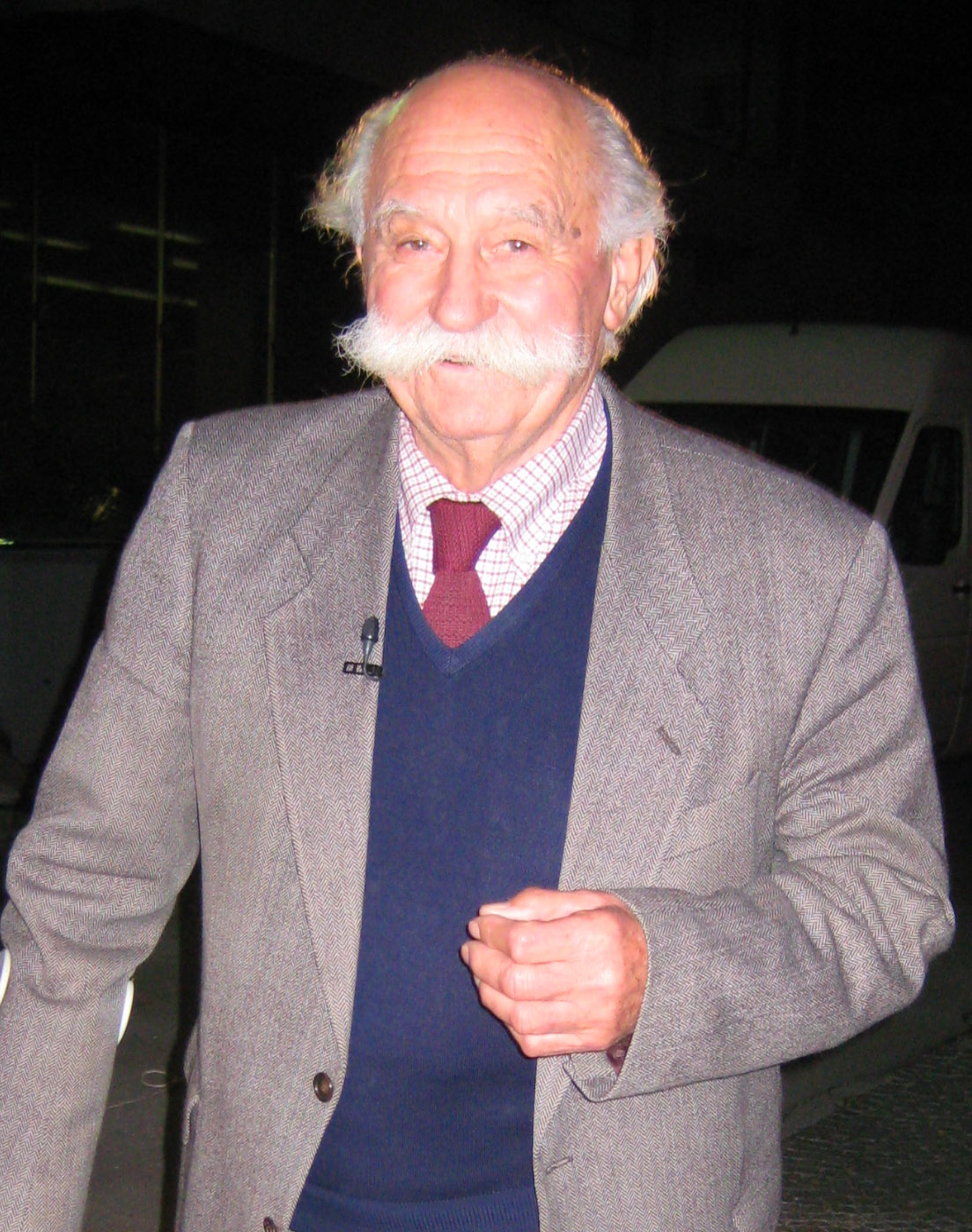
- Stanovnik in 2007

President of the Presidency of Slovenia
- In office 6 May 1988 – 10 May 1990
- Prime Minister: Dušan Šinigoj
- Preceded by: France Popit
- Succeeded by: Milan Kučan

Personal details
- Born: 4 August 1922 Ljubljana, Kingdom of Serbs, Croats and Slovenes
- Died: 31 January 2020 (aged 97) Slovenia
- Party: League of Communists of Slovenia (until 1990)
- Other political affiliations: Party of Democratic Renewal (from 1990)
- Relations: Aleš Stanovnik (cousin); Tine Velikonja (cousin)
- Janez Stanovnik's voice Stanovnik opening the 714th session of the United Nations General Assembly Second Committee; Recorded 20 September 1960

Janez Stanovnik (4 August 1922 – 31 January 2020) was a Slovenian economist, politician, and Partisan. He served as the last President of the Socialist Republic of Slovenia between 1988 and 1990. From 2003 to 2013, he was the president of the Slovenian Partisan Veterans' Association.

== Biography ==
He was born in Ljubljana, then part of the Kingdom of Serbs, Croats and Slovenes, to a Slovene Roman Catholic family. His father Ivan Stanovnik was a prominent member of the left wing of the Slovene People's Party and served as deputy mayor of Ljubljana. His mother was the niece of the Bishop of Ljubljana Anton Bonaventura Jeglič.

He attended the classical gymnasium in Ljubljana. As a high school student, he became active in the Christian Socialist association Zarja (Dawn), where he became acquainted with the Christian left intellectuals like Edvard Kocbek and Bogo Grafenauer. After the Axis invasion of Yugoslavia, he became active in the Liberation Front of the Slovenian People and was imprisoned by the Italian regime in the annexed Province of Ljubljana between autumn 1941 and February 1942. Soon after his release from jail, he joined the Partisan resistance in the Province of Ljubljana. In February 1944, he joined the Communist Party. Between April 1944 and May 1945, he was among the organizers of the Partisan resistance in the Slovenian Littoral and was member of the regional national liberation committee.

In 1946, after the war, he became the personal secretary of the Slovene Yugoslav communist leader Edvard Kardelj. He graduated from the University of Belgrade's Law School. Between 1952 and 1956, he was member of the Yugoslav mission at the United Nations. In 1956, he returned to Yugoslavia and started studying economics. He was a professor at both the Institute of Social Sciences in Belgrade, and the University of Ljubljana.

Between 1965 and 1966, he served as an advisor to the United Nations Conference on Trade and Development and between 1968 and 1983, he worked on the United Nations Economic Commission for Europe. There he served as the executive secretary of the commission from 1968 to 1982.

In 1988, he was appointed as President of the Socialist Republic of Slovenia. Due to the political upheaval, he managed to use this largely ceremonial position in order to negotiate with the opposition groups, especially the Committee for the Defence of Human Rights during the Slovenian Spring. Because of his support for a peaceful transition to parliamentary democracy, he was called by the press, somewhat ironically, "father of the nation".

In 2003, he was elected as Chairman of the Association of Slovenian Partisan Veterans, he stayed at this position until 2013, when he was named the honorary president of the Association.

== Personal life ==
Stanovnik was married twice and had four children. He was the recipient of several awards, including the Commemorative Medal of the Partisans of 1941, and was an honorary citizen of Ljubljana.

He spent his last years in a retirement home and died on 31 January 2020, aged 97.

Stanovnik was the cousin of the Christian Socialist activist Aleš Stanovnik, who was executed by the Italian occupation forces in 1942. He was also the cousin of Tine Velikonja, former member of the Slovene Home Guard and prominent activists of the Home Guard veteran association Nova slovenska zaveza (New Slovenian Covenant) after 1990.
