= Danilo Türk =

3rd President of Slovenia (born 1952)

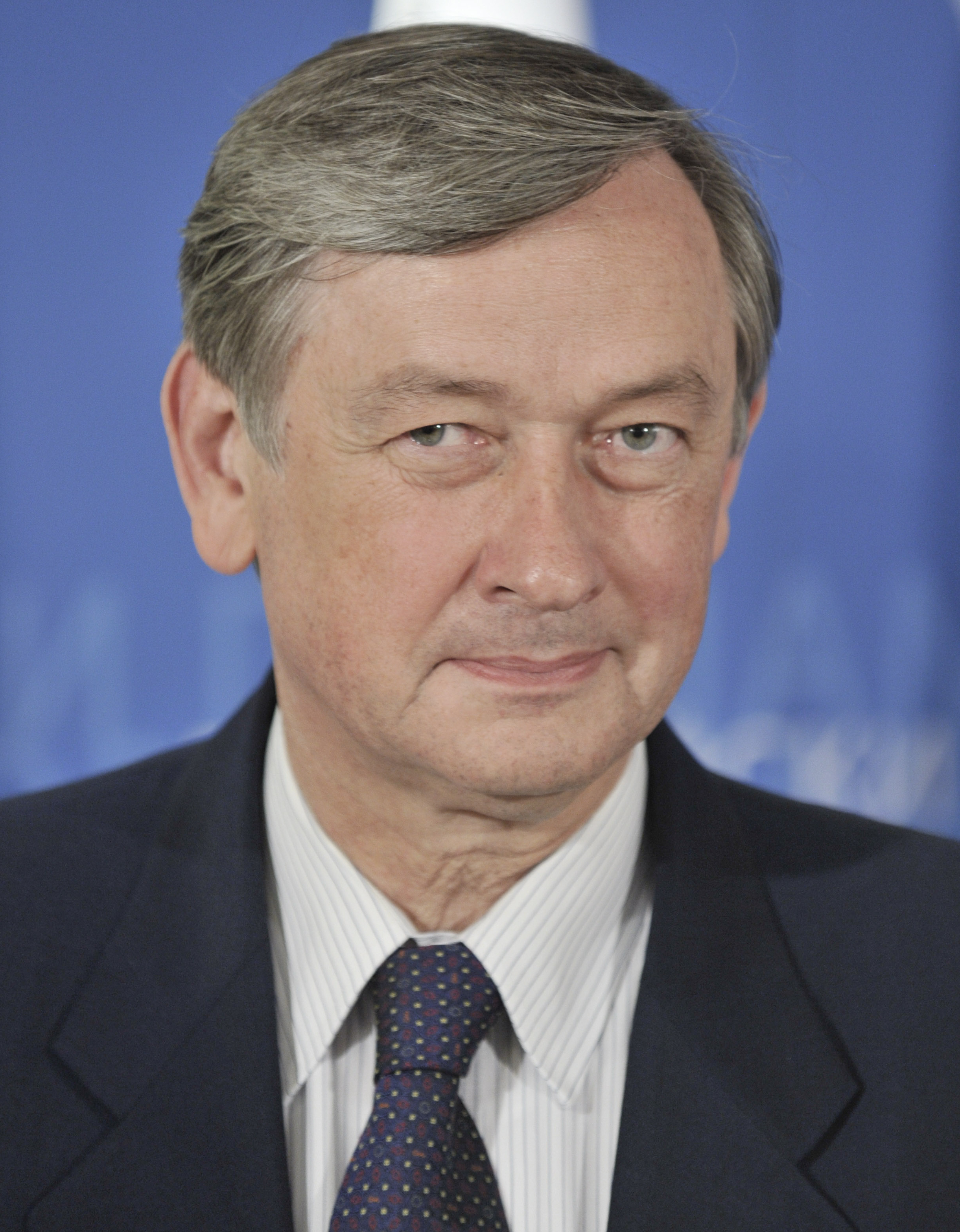
- Türk in 2010

3rd President of Slovenia
- In office 23 December 2007 – 22 December 2012
- Prime Minister: Janez Janša; Borut Pahor; Janez Janša
- Preceded by: Janez Drnovšek
- Succeeded by: Borut Pahor

Ambassador of Slovenia to the United Nations
- In office September 1992 – February 2000
- President: Milan Kučan
- Preceded by: Office established
- Succeeded by: Ernest Petrič

Personal details
- Born: 19 February 1952 (age 74) Maribor, PR Slovenia, FPR Yugoslavia
- Party: Independent
- Spouse: Barbara Miklič
- Children: 1
- Education: University of Ljubljana; University of Belgrade
- Website: Official website

Danilo Türk (pronounced [daˈníːlɔ ˈtýɾk]; born 19 February 1952) is a Slovenian diplomat, professor of international law, human rights expert, and political figure who served as President of Slovenia from 2007 to 2012. He was the first Slovene ambassador to the United Nations, from 1992 to 2000, and was the UN Assistant Secretary General for Political Affairs from 2000 to 2005.

Türk is a visiting professor of international law at Columbia University in New York City, a professor emeritus at the Faculty of Law of the University of Ljubljana, and non-resident senior fellow of Chongyang Institute for Financial studies at Renmin University of China in Beijing. He is the founder of the Danilo Türk Foundation, devoted mostly to the rehabilitation of child victims of armed conflict. Türk is also the chairman of the Global High Level Panel on Water and Peace and the chairman of the board of the Global Fairness Initiative, a Washington, D.C.–based NGO dedicated to economic and social development in developing nations.

In 2016, he was an unsuccessful candidate for the post of Secretary-General of the United Nations.

== Early life ==
Türk was born in a lower-middle-class family in Maribor, Slovenia (then part of the Federal People's Republic of Yugoslavia). He attended Maribor Grammar School No. 2 (II. gimnazija Maribor). In 1971, he enrolled at the University of Ljubljana, where he studied law. After graduation (1975) he served as the secretary of the commission for minority and expatriate affairs at the Socialist Alliance of Working People (SZDL), an organisation sponsored by the League of Communists of Yugoslavia. In December 1979 he became the chairman of that commission and a member of the executive committee of the SZDL. At the same time he continued his studies. He obtained an MA with a thesis on minority rights from the University of Belgrade's Law School in 1978, and then became a teaching assistant at the Faculty of Law in Ljubljana. In 1982, he obtained his PhD with a dissertation on the principle of non-intervention in international law at the University in Ljubljana and received a full-time job as an assistant professor at the University in Ljubljana's Faculty of Law. In 1983, he became the director of the University of Ljubljana's Institute for International Law. In the following years, he worked on human and minority rights. In the mid-1980s, he collaborated with Amnesty International to report on human rights issues in Yugoslavia.

Between 1986 and 1992, he served in a personal capacity as a member the UN Sub-Commission on Prevention of Discrimination and Protection of Minorities and was the UN Special Rapporteur on the Realization of Economic, Social and Cultural Rights. Together with Louis Joinet (France), he was also the UN Special Rapporteur on Freedom of Expression. In 1987 he initiated the establishment of the Council for Human Rights in Slovenia and served until 1992 as the council’s vice-chairman. In 1990/91 he coauthored the human rights chapter in Slovenia's constitution.

== Diplomatic and academic career ==
From 1992 to 2000, Türk was the first Slovene Permanent Representative to the United Nations. During this time, he secured the election of Slovenia to the UN Security Council (1998–1999) and was president of the United Nations Security Council in August 1998 and November 1999.^{[1]} Between 1996 and 1998, he was a member of the UN Human Rights Committee. From 2000 to 2005, he served as UN Assistant Secretary-General for Political Affairs under Secretary General Kofi Annan. In 2005 he returned to Slovenia and became a professor of international law; from May 2006 to December 2007 he served as the vice dean of student affairs at the University of Ljubljana's Faculty of Law. Türk has published over 100 articles in various law journals and three books. He authored the first Slovene book on international law, titled Temelji mednarodnega prava (Foundations of International Law, 2007, revised 2015).

In 2019, Türk was elected president of the Club of Madrid.

== Presidency ==
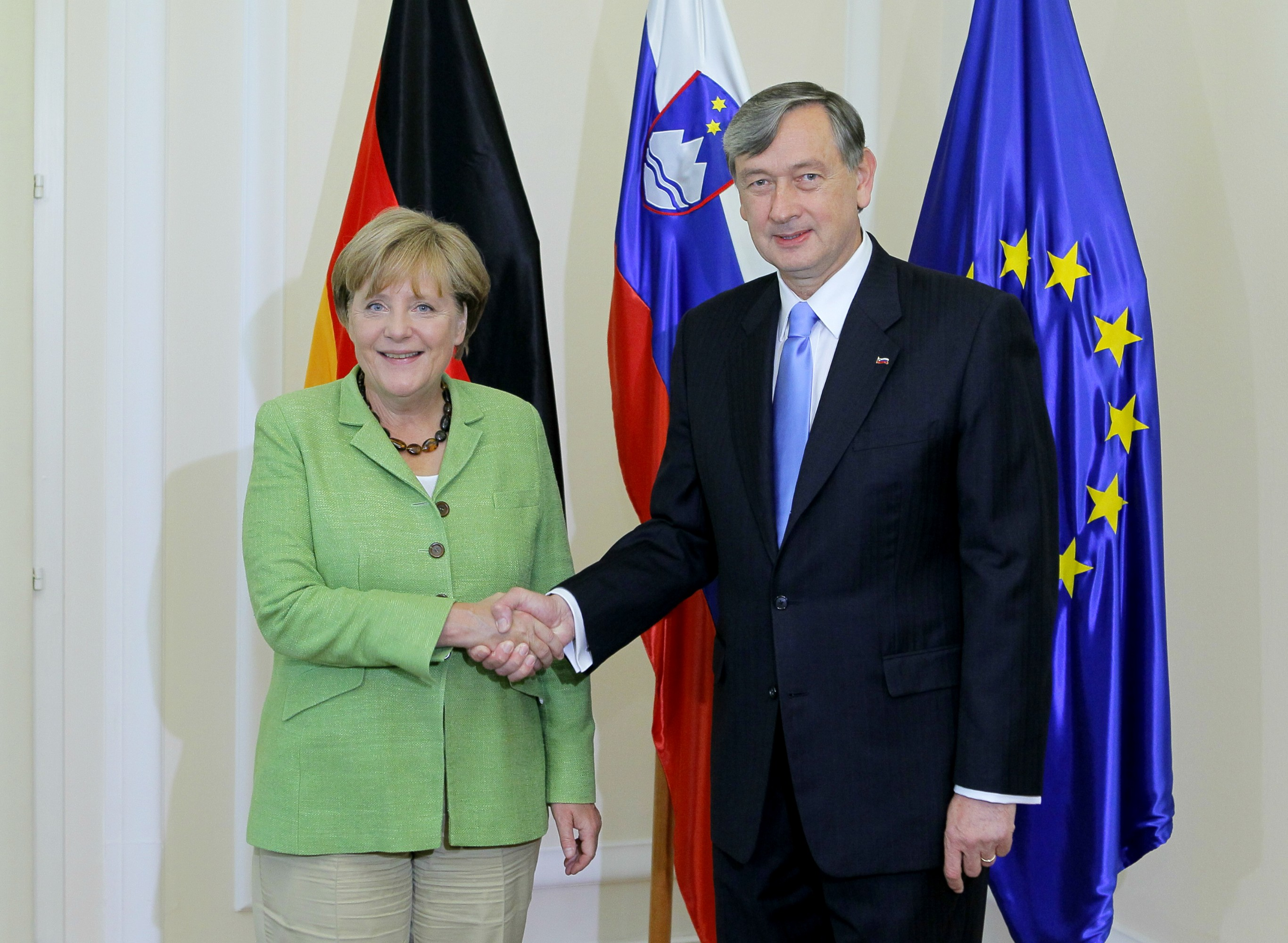
Türk with German Chancellor Angela Merkel, 30 August 2011

In June 2007, Türk ran in the Slovene presidential election. As an independent candidate, he was backed by a broad coalition of left-wing parties, composed of the opposition Zares party and Social Democrats, the Democratic Party of Pensioners of Slovenia, and the extra-parliamentary Christian Socialist Party and Democratic Party. In the first round of the presidential elections, held on 21 October 2007, he placed second with 24.54% of the votes, which brought him into the runoff against the centre right candidate Lojze Peterle (who received 28.50% of the popular vote). He won the runoff on 11 November 2007 with 68.2% of the votes,^{[2]} becoming the third president of Slovenia on 23 December 2007. Türk ran for reelection in 2012, but lost the election to Borut Pahor in a second round of voting, held on 2 December 2012.^{[5]} He received roughly one-third of the votes.

== UN Secretary-General candidature ==
In December 2013, Türk announced that he was planning to run for UN Secretary-General. He was soon supported by Prime Minister Alenka Bratušek and Minister of Foreign Affairs Karel Erjavec. In January 2014 the Slovene government endorsed Türk as its candidate for UN Secretary-General. He was later also supported by Prime Minister Miro Cerar and President Borut Pahor, as well as by Speaker of the National Assembly of Slovenia Milan Brglez (also a professor at the University of Ljubljana). In accordance with the UN procedure, the government of Slovenia nominated Danilo Türk as candidate for UN Secretary-General on 8 February 2016.

Türk is an experienced member of the United Nations community. He served as the first Permanent Representative of the Republic of Slovenia to the UN and remained in New York as ambassador for eight years, from 1992 until 2000. As Slovenian representative he also presided over the United Nations Security Council twice. His work was recognised by Secretary-General Kofi Annan, who chose Türk as one of his close advisors and appointed him Assistant Secretary-General in 2000. He served in this position until 2005, when he returned to Slovenia to teach international law at the University of Ljubljana.

Türk has long been recognised as an expert and global advocate for human rights and his work has been connected with human rights and the fight for equality for more than 40 years.

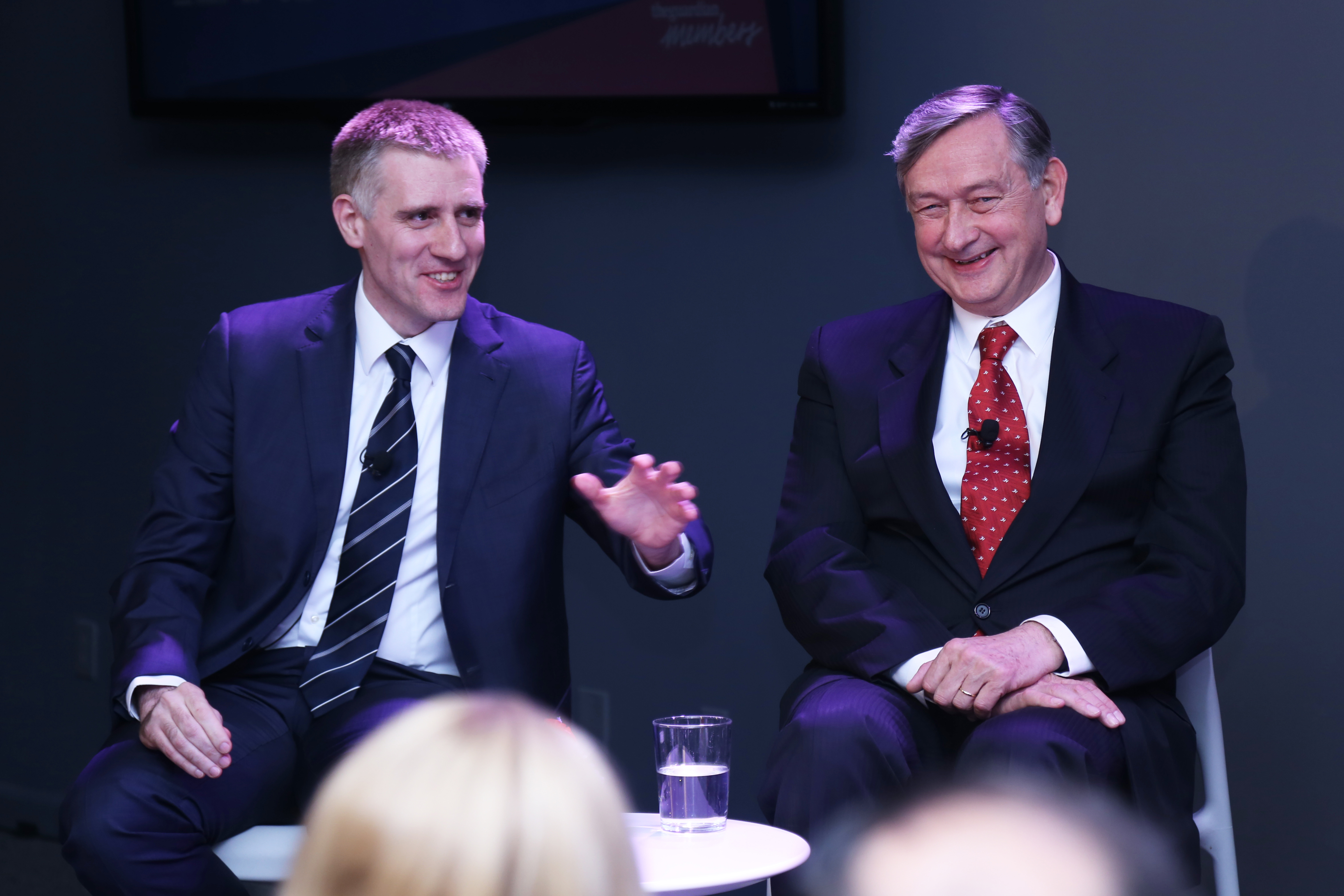
Türk alongside Montenegrin Foreign Minister Igor Lukšić, 13 April 2016

One element of human rights that Turk has been questioned about is the UN's role in the Haiti cholera outbreak that has been widely discussed and criticized. There has been indisputable evidence that the UN is the proximate cause for bringing cholera to Haiti. Peacekeepers sent to Haiti from Nepal were carrying asymptomatic cholera and they did not treat their waste properly before dumping it into Haiti's water stream. In an interview with the New York Times, Türk was asked if cholera victims should receive compensation. He responded by saying he hopes the UN would "provide the victims with a fair process and an effective remedy." St. Vincent followed this up during the UN informal dialogues by asking Mr. Türk how he would place the pursuit of an effective remedy on his list of priorities. Türk's response was that though the UN enjoys immunity from prosecution, "there are other ways of establishing fair process and effectiveness". He also stated "current discussions that I know exist within the Secretariat and between the Secretariat and member states will produce such effectiveness and fairness." Following-up at the media stakeout, Inner City Press questioned Türk about his statement that there may be some process going on behind the scenes to pay compensation. Türk responded by saying that there have been informal conversations about the Haitian situation, and though he does not have full knowledge, he can say that "this story is not closed." He admits that he values the importance of legal regulation including UN immunity, but he also believes in remedies and fair processes.

37 human rights organizations recently signed onto a UN Secretary General accountability pledge. This pledge asks the candidates to take action on two human rights violations that have tarnished the United Nations' image: failing to provide remedies for victims of cholera in Haiti, and sexual exploitation and abuse by peacekeepers. Türk issued a statement responding to Aids Free World and the Institute for Justice & Democracy in Haiti, expressing his support for the organizations' efforts. While he acknowledges that he has "clearly expressed [his] commitment to fairness towards the victims of cholera in Haiti and for substantial, credible and speedy investigations of the cases of sexual abuse committed by peacekeepers", he cannot undertake formal pledges. Nevertheless, he reaffirms his commitment to better UN accountability and says "it is abundantly clear where my heart is."

== Later career ==
In 2022, Türk was appointed by United Nations Secretary General António Guterres to the High-Level Advisory Board on Effective Multilateralism, co-chaired by Ellen Johnson Sirleaf and Stefan Löfven.

== Personal life ==
Türk has been married to Barbara Miklič since 1976. They have one daughter and one granddaughter. He is the brother of the manager Vitoslav Türk, member of the Slovenian Democratic Party. Türk speaks Slovene, English, French, Croatian, and Serbian.

=== Health ===
In March 2011, Türk successfully underwent robot-assisted prostate cancer surgery at the Urology Institute in Innsbruck, Austria.

== Honors and awards ==
- Albania: Received a copy of the key of the city of Tirana on the occasion of his state visit to Albania.
- Austria: Grand Star of the Decoration of Honour for Services to the Republic of Austria (2011)
- Azerbaijan: Ilyas Afandiyev International Prize (2010)
- Colombia: Received a copy of the key of the city of Bogota (2008)
- European Union: European Court of Auditors Medal (2012)
- Finland: Commander, First Class, Order of the White Rose of Finland (2010)
- Hungary: Gold medal of the Széchenyi Scientific Society (2008)
- Hungary: Honorary Doctorate, University of Szeged (2010)
- Hungary: Honorary Doctorate, Corvinus University of Budapest (2015)
- Iceland: Knight Grand Cross, Order of the Falcon (2011)
- Italy: Knight Grand Cross with Cordon, Order of Merit of the Italian Republic (2011)
- Kazakhstan: Honorary Professor of the Academy of Public Administration, Astana (2009)
- Monaco : Grand Cross of the Order of Saint-Charles (11 January 2011)
- Norway: Grand Cross, Royal Norwegian Order of St Olav (2011)
- Peru: Grand Cross with Diamonds, Order of the Sun of Peru (2008)
- Russia: Honorary Doctorate, Moscow State Institute of International Relations (2012)
- Ukraine: Honorary Doctorate, V.N. Karazin Kharkiv National University (2011)
- United Kingdom: Received the Grand Cross of the Order of the Bath by Queen Elizabeth II during her visit to Slovenia in 2008.
- United States of America: Arthur J. Goldberg Award, Touro Law College (2008)
- Protector of the European Academy of Sciences and Arts (2008)

Political offices
Preceded by Janez Drnovšek	President of Slovenia; 2007–2012	Succeeded by Borut Pahor
