= Slovenija ceste Tehnika =

Slovenija ceste Tehnika (SCT) was the biggest construction company in Slovenia. From 1974 until May 2011, its managing director was Ivan Zidar. In June 2011, the company entered into receivership proceedings that lasted until 2015.
