= Tamara Kučan =

Serbian author (born 1989)

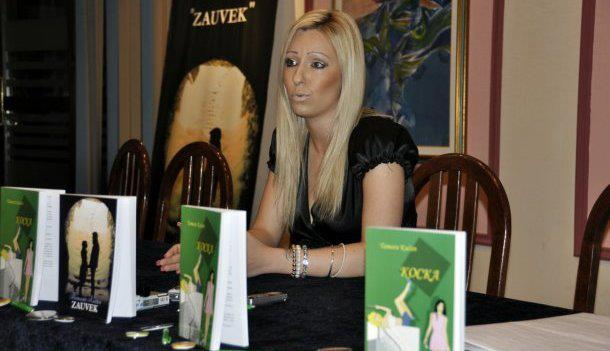
- Born: Tamara Kučan; 22 August 1989 (age 37); Belgrade, SR Serbia, SFR Yugoslavia
- Occupation: Novelist
- Writing career
- Genres: Non-fiction, Romance

Tamara Kučan (Serbian Cyrillic: Тамара Кучан, born 22 August 1989) is a Serbian author. Kučan started writing at the age of 16. She was admitted to the Association of Writers of Serbia in the year 2010, becoming the youngest member ever admitted. Kučan's writing style is compared to Charles Bukowski.

== Bibliography ==
- Beogradjanka (“The Belgrade Girl”, a novel) (Urban Art, 2010)
- Made in Beograd (“Made in Belgrade”, a novel ) (Urban Art, 2008)
- Kocka (“The Dice”, a novel ) (Urban Art, 2010)
- Zauvek (“Forever”, a novel ) (Urban Art, 2012)
- Peščani sat (“Hourglass”, a novel ) (Urban Art, 2013)
