= Matthew Lee (lawyer) =

American lawyer and novelist

- Born: Washington, D.C., U.S.
- Education: Fordham Law School
- Occupations: Journalist; author; lawyer
- Notable credit(s): Founded Inner City Press and Fair Finance Watch; author of Predatory Bender

Matthew Lee is an American public interest lawyer, journalist, author of the self-published novel Predatory Bender, and founder of two non-profit organizations, Inner City Press and Fair Finance Watch.

Lee is known for breaking stories and in recent years for live-tweeting Manhattan federal court trials. Other journalists have described him as being prone to conspiracy theories, derailed by clunky writing, unorthodox methods, and questionable news judgment. Some of Lee's former colleagues have accused him of printing gossip, rumors and lies. The President of the United Nations Correspondents Association said Lee is "brilliant" but his behavior was increasingly unpredictable and he "can ask smart questions, but accuses people of things that don’t exist." Confrontations with Lee have led to journalists calling the police and United Nations security.

== Personal life ==
Lee was born in Washington, D.C. to parents of Chinese and Anglo descent. His father was in the U.S. Foreign Service. After finishing middle school overseas, Lee attended high school in the US. Lee grew up in Europe, the Middle East and Washington, and dropped out of Harvard after two years after feeling disgust with the excited reactions of his fellow students to Goldman Sachs recruiters. He later graduated from Fordham University without getting a bachelors degree.

== Career ==
After dropping out of Harvard, he volunteered with the Catholic Worker Movement. He lived and worked in their soup kitchen dormitory and covered housing for The Catholic Worker newspaper and worked with a construction crew from Brooklyn.

In 1987, Lee started Inner City Press, which he finances through Google Ads and LexisNexis.

In 2000, Lee's investigation of the merger of US Bank and Firstar was followed by a Federal Reserve Board inquiry into the banks' practices. In 2004, Lee's challenge to Citigroup's CitiFinancial Credit Co. resulted in Citigroup paying a $70 million fine. As of 2005, Lee produced weekly reports on, and advocates concerning global banks such as HSBC. In 2005-2006, Lee was engaged in litigation to deem the "citizens-only" provision of the Freedom of Information Act of Delaware (and ten other states) to be unconstitutional.

In mid-2006, Lee published allegations in Inner City Press of human rights abuses by the Uganda People's Defense Force in the Karamoja region of Uganda, which it denied. On February 13, 2008 Google removed Inner City Press from Google News, which Lee alleged was due to pressure from the United Nations. Google News said it was a glitch and that Inner City Press would be restored.

In August 2011, Inner City Press published a UN internal plan for post-Gaddafi Libya. In October 2012, Inner City Press raised fair lending and compliance issues about M&T Bank's application to acquire Hudson City Bancorp.

In 2012, after Inner City Press's reporting on Sri Lanka, Syria and United Nations corruption, the United Nations Correspondents Association created a Board of Examination to investigate Lee for allegations of unethical and unprofessional behaviour and expel Inner City Press. The Board of Examination included the UN bureau chiefs of Reuters, Bloomberg and AFP and was started by Giampaolo Pioli, the President and Executive Committee of the UNCA. According to The Guardian, personal disputes including Lee complaining about other journalists not crediting him and accusing the UNCA president of a conflict of interest involving Sri Lanka were at the heart of the dispute. The Board of Examination was created after Lee confronted reporters from Reuters and Louis Charbonneau about articles he thought he should have been credited in, and a history of a similar disputes. During the dispute, Lee frequently emailed his accusers and their bosses, and accused an Agence France Presse correspondent of attempting to punish him for embarrassing the Élysée Palace. Lee also accused the UNCA of engineering threats against him, which they called "a false and damaging claim". The spokesman for MALU, the orgnizsation granting UN press accreditation said the investigation would not "directly influence" their decision about Lee. The World Policy Journal contradicted Lee's allegations of censorship, writing that his stories "appear to harass his accusers" and that one person was brought to tears by what Lee wrote about her. After his eviction from the UN, Lee spent his mornings waiting at the UN entrance in the morning so he can ask delegates questions as they enter while live streaming, and wrote his articles at his bus stop and the library.

In 2012, Lee left the UNCA after unsuccessfully running against Giampaolo Pioli for president.

In the Spring of 2013, in the US, Inner City Press and Fair Finance Watch raised fair lending issues regarding Investors Bank.

Lee and Fair Finance Watch in October 2013 raised fair lending concerns regarding Mercantile Bank and its proposed acquiring of FirstBank. Mercantile later told the Security & Exchange Commission the issues Lee and FFW raised would result in a delay of the merger.

In January 2016, Lee went to a United Nations briefing uninvited, posting on Twitter and live streaming the event, and refusing to leave starting an argument between Lee and United Nations press staff members and security officials. As a result, Lee's resident correspondent status at United Nations (UN) was downgraded to non-resident correspondent and his free office cleaned out, which Lee called an attempt to censor him. Some of Lee's fellow journalists said his reaction was a typical overstatement, that he has a persecution complex and that confrontations with Lee had led other journalists to call the police and United Nations security. Other journalists, including Notimex's Maurizio Guerrero, called the punishment excessive.

In 2018, Inner City Press / Fair Finance Watch challenged a merger by People's United Bank.

In 2023, Lee live-tweeted the Samuel Bankman-Fried trial. In January 2024 he tweeted about the E. Jean Carroll v. Trump trial, and told Salon that 10 consecutive objections from Carroll's attorneys were sustained.
