= Borut Pahor =

4th President of Slovenia

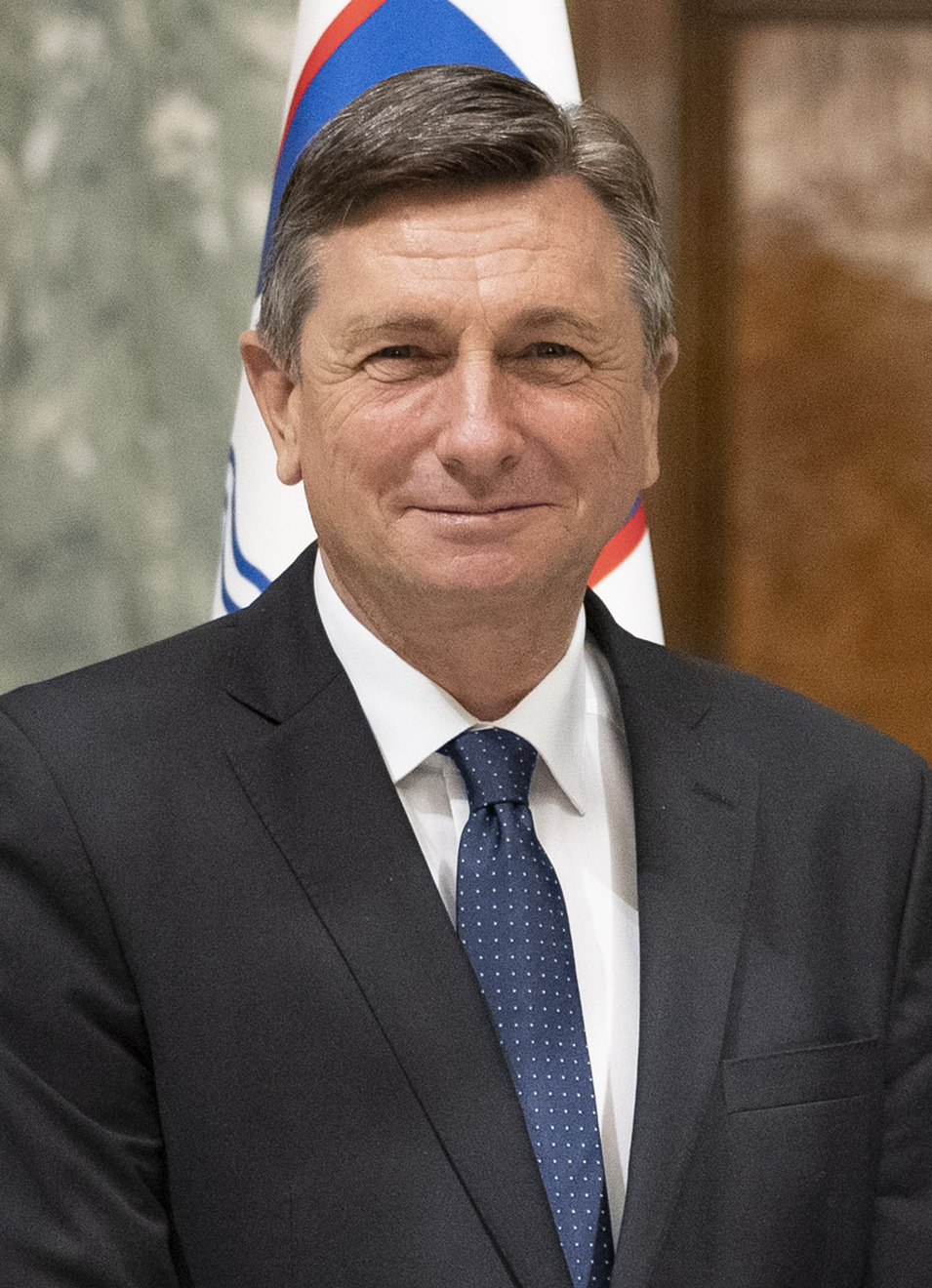
- Pahor in 2022

4th President of Slovenia
- In office 22 December 2012 – 22 December 2022
- Prime Minister: Janez Janša; Alenka Bratušek; Miro Cerar; Marjan Šarec; Janez Janša; Robert Golob
- Preceded by: Danilo Türk
- Succeeded by: Nataša Pirc Musar

6th Prime Minister of Slovenia
- In office 21 November 2008 – 10 February 2012
- President: Danilo Türk
- Preceded by: Janez Janša
- Succeeded by: Janez Janša

Member of the European Parliament
- In office 20 July 2004 – 14 October 2008
- Constituency: Slovenia

Speaker of the National Assembly
- In office 10 November 2000 – 12 July 2004
- Preceded by: Janez Podobnik
- Succeeded by: Feri Horvat

Personal details
- Born: 2 November 1963 (age 62) Postojna, SR Slovenia, SFR Yugoslavia
- Party: SKJ (before 1990); SD (1990–2012); Independent (since 2012)
- Domestic partner: Tanja Pečar
- Children: 1
- Education: University of Ljubljana

Borut Pahor (Slovene pronunciation: [ˈbóːɾut ˈpàːxɔɾ]; born 2 November 1963) is a Slovenian politician, diplomat, media personality and barrister who served as President of Slovenia from 2012 to 2022. He previously served as Prime Minister of Slovenia from 2008 to 2012.

A longtime member and former president of the Social Democrats, Pahor served several terms as a member of the National Assembly and was its speaker from 2000 to 2004. In 2004, he was elected as a Member of the European Parliament (MEP). Following the victory of the Social Democrats in the 2008 Slovenian parliamentary election, Pahor was appointed as prime minister.

In September 2011, Pahor's government lost a confidence vote amidst an economic crisis and political tensions. He continued to serve as the pro tempore Prime Minister until he was replaced by Janez Janša in February 2012. In June 2012, he announced he would run for the office of President of Slovenia. He defeated the incumbent Danilo Türk in a runoff election held on 2 December 2012, receiving roughly two-thirds of the vote. In November 2017, Pahor was re-elected for a second term against Marjan Šarec.

== Early life ==
Pahor was born in Postojna, SR Slovenia, in the former Yugoslavia, and spent his childhood in the town of Nova Gorica, before moving to the nearby town of Šempeter pri Gorici. His father died at a young age and his mother, Iva Pahor Martelanc, a seamstress and Nazi concentration camp survivor, raised him as a single mother.

After graduating from Nova Gorica High School in 1983, Pahor enrolled in the University of Ljubljana, where he studied public policy and political science at the Faculty of Sociology, Political Science, and Journalism (FSPN, now known as Faculty of Social Sciences, FDV). He graduated in 1987 with a thesis on peace negotiations between members of the Non-Aligned Movement. His bachelor's thesis was awarded the Student Prešeren Award, the highest academic award for students in Slovenia. According to the Slovenian press, Pahor worked as a male model to support himself during his university studies.

== Career ==
=== Pre-1990s ===
Pahor became involved in party politics already in high school. At the age of 15, he became the chairman of the high school student's section of the Alliance of Socialist Youth of Slovenia in Nova Gorica, the autonomous youth branch of the Communist Party. In his college years, Pahor joined the ruling League of Communists of Slovenia.

In 1987, he ran for the Presidency of University Section of the Alliance of the Socialist Youth of Slovenia. This internal election was important, as it was the first election in Yugoslavia organized entirely according to democratic principles. In the election, in which the members could freely choose between two antagonistic teams, Pahor's team lost to a more liberal faction.

As a consequence, the Youth Alliance emancipated from the control of the Communist Party: a process that resulted in the formation of the Liberal Democratic Party in 1990. Due to this shift, Pahor continued his political career in the main apparatus of the Communist Party. He rose to prominence in the late 1980s, when he became one of the strongest supporters of the reformist wing of the Communist Party, led by Milan Kučan and Ciril Ribičič.

During the political crisis caused by the so-called Ljubljana trial in the spring and summer of 1988, Pahor was the first high-ranking member of the Communist Party to propose that the Party renounced the monopoly over the Slovenian political life, and thus opened the path to full-fledged political pluralism.

In 1989, Pahor co-founded and chaired the Democratic Forum, a youth section within the Slovenian Communist Party established as a counter-force to the Alliance of Socialist Youth, which was now already openly opposing the communists' policies. The same year, he was appointed to the Central Committee of the League of Communists of Slovenia, thus becoming the youngest member of this body in its history. In 1990, he participated in the Slovenian delegation at the last Congress of the League of Communists of Yugoslavia in Belgrade.

=== 1990s ===
In the first free elections in Slovenia in April 1990, in which the communists were defeated by the Democratic Opposition of Slovenia (DEMOS), Pahor was elected in the Slovenian Parliament on the list of the League of Communists - Party of Democratic Reform. Together with Milan Balažic, Pahor emerged as the leader of the pro-reformist wing of the party, which advocated a clear cut with the communist past and a full-fledged acceptance of free-market economy; they even went so far to propose the merger of the party with Jože Pučnik's Social Democratic Party of Slovenia. As the party continued to lose support during the whole 1990s, falling under 10% of the popular vote in 1996, Pahor's positions grew in strength. In 1997, he was elected as its president on a Third way-centrist platform.

In 1997, he was involved in the attempt of creating a common left-wing government between Pahor's United List of Social Democrats, the Liberal Democracy of Slovenia, the Slovenian National Party, and the Pensioner's Party. Pahor was proposed as Minister of Foreign Affairs in this left-wing coalition government, but the proposal failed to gain a majority in the parliament. Instead, the Liberal Democracy of Slovenia formed a coalition with the conservative Slovenian People's Party, based on a centrist platform, which ruled until 2000. Pahor's Social Democratic party remained in opposition, although it supported the government in several key decisions.

=== Forging a centrist agenda ===
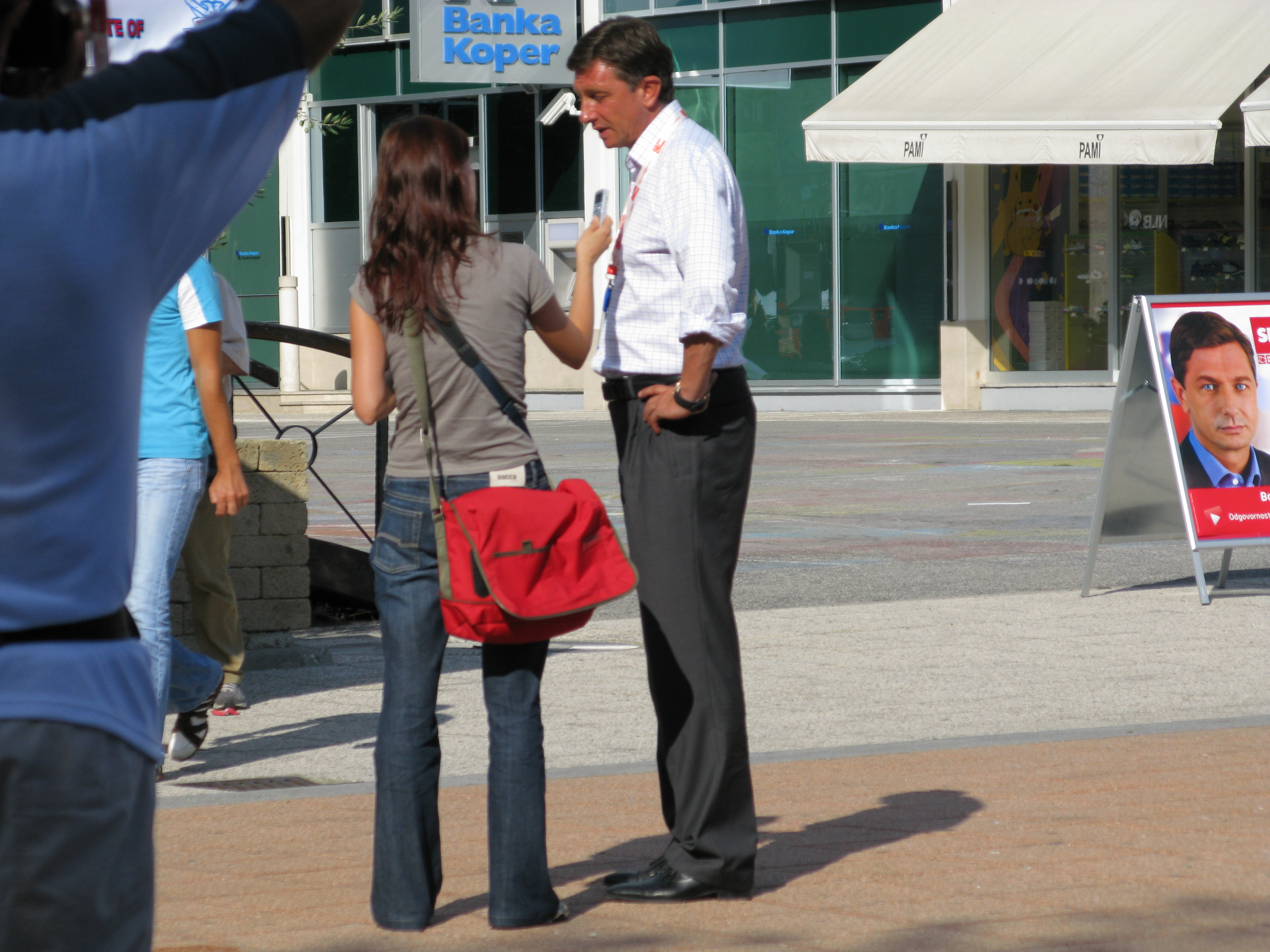
Pahor speaking to a Slovenian reporter in a Social Democrats party rally, 8 September 2008

In 2000, Pahor led his party in the coalition with the Liberal Democracy of Slovenia led by Janez Drnovšek. Pahor was elected speaker of the Slovenian National Assembly (the lower house of the Slovenian Parliament). This was his first important institutional office. During this period, he distinguished himself with a moderate and non-partisan behaviour, which gained him the respect of large sectors of the centre-right opposition.

As the speaker of the parliament, he pushed for a public commemoration in the memory of the deceased anti-communist dissident Jože Pučnik, which was initially opposed by the more radical members of the ruling left wing coalition.

At the same time, Pahor clashed with left sectors within his own party over the issue of Slovenia's NATO membership. Throughout the 1990s and 2000s, Pahor remained an outspoken supporter of Slovenia's entry in this military alliance, which was opposed by several left-wing sectors of the society.

In June 2004, he was elected as member of the European Parliament, where was a member of the Socialist group. He served on Parliament's Budgetary Control committee and the Constitutional Committee during the period of the rejection of the Constitutional treaty by France and the Netherlands and the negotiation of the Lisbon Treaty, supporting the Parliament's line on this (Richard Corbett and Inigo Mendez de Vigo report). In October 2004, the centre-left coalition in Slovenia lost to the liberal-conservative Slovenian Democratic Party and its conservative allies. In the first years of Janez Janša's centre-right government, Pahor openly polemized with Anton Rop, the leader of the Liberal Democracy of Slovenia, over the opposition strategy towards the government. In the polemics, which soon became known to the public as the "Dear Tone, Dear Borut Discussion" (after the opening lines of the leaders'), Pahor opted for a more constructive opposition. In 2006, Pahor's Social Democrats entered an agreement with the ruling coalition party for the collaboration in the economic reform policies.

Due to the gradual dissolution of the Liberal Democracy of Slovenia, by 2007 the Social Democrats became the second-largest political force in Slovenia, and Pahor thus became the non-formal leader of the left-wing opposition.

The same year, Pahor considered running for the presidential elections, in which he was favoured by the polls. However, due to the high ranking of his party, he decided to support the presidential candidate Danilo Türk, and continue to lead the Social Democrats to the parliamentary elections of 2008.

== Prime Minister (2008–2012) ==
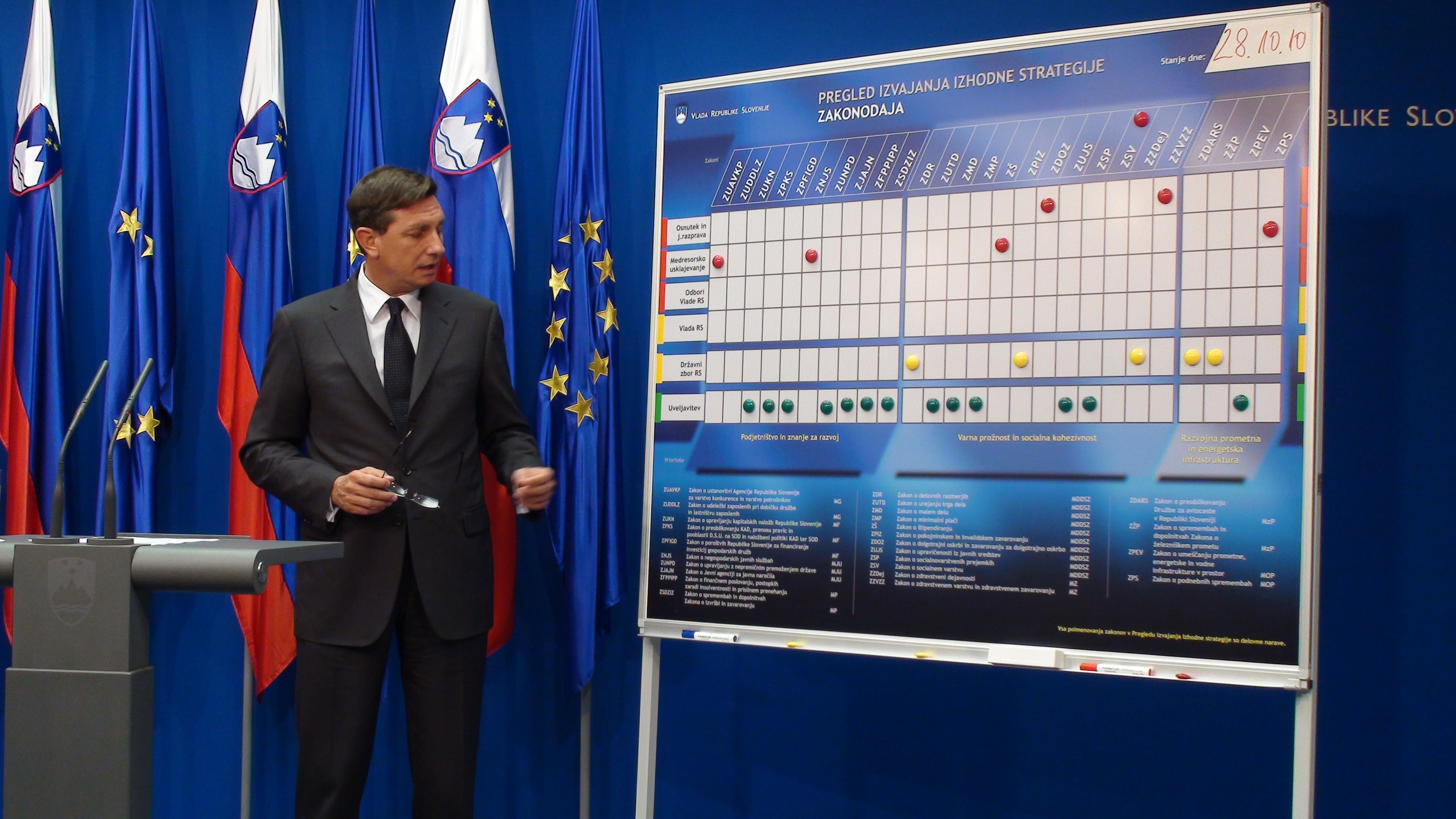
Pahor presenting his government's reform program

Pahor was Prime Minister of Slovenia from November 2008 until February 2012, heading the government formed by Social Democrats in coalition with the Liberal Democracy of Slovenia and Zares.

Faced by the global economic crisis his government proposed economic reforms, but they were rejected by the opposition leader Janez Janša and by a referendum in 2011. The voters voted in favour of an arbitration agreement with Croatia, aimed to solve the border dispute between the countries, emerging after the breakup of Yugoslavia.

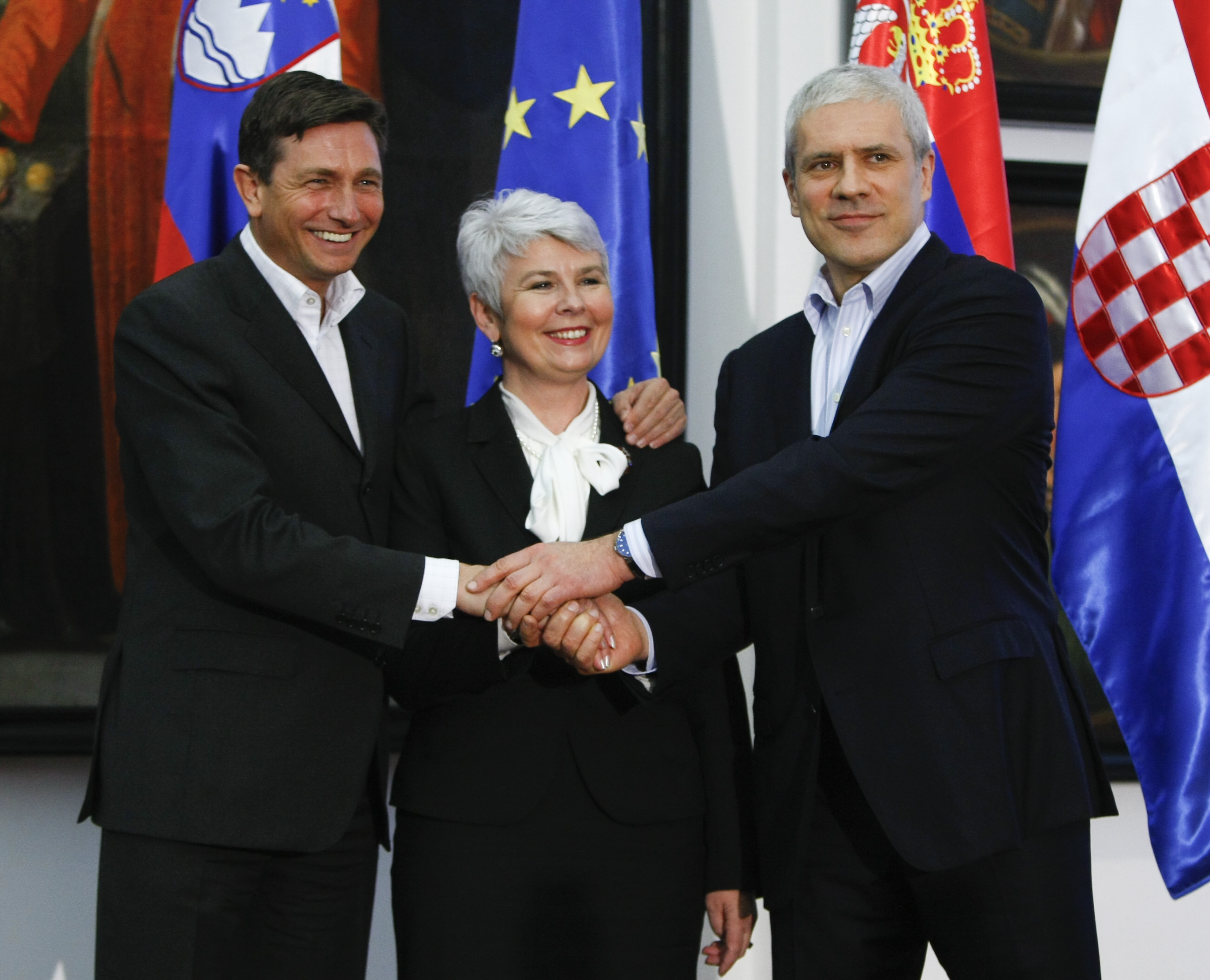
Pahor with Croatian Prime Minister Jadranka Kosor and Serbian President Boris Tadić on 5 March 2010

Tensions between the coalition partners reached the summit in 2011, when two parties, DeSUS in April and Zares in July, left the government. The opposition has accused the government of corruption and mishandling the economy. Faced with the loss of several ministers and falling public support, Pahor asked the Parliament for a motion of confidence. On 20 September, the Parliament voted 51–36 against the motion, resulting in the fall of the government. After the vote, Pahor said: "I do not feel any bitterness. I have full faith in our people and the future of Slovenia."

According to the constitution, the Parliament has to elect a new prime minister in 30 days. If this does not happen, the President of Slovenia dissolves the Parliament and calls for early election. Most political parties had expressed opinion that they preferred early election instead of forming a new government.

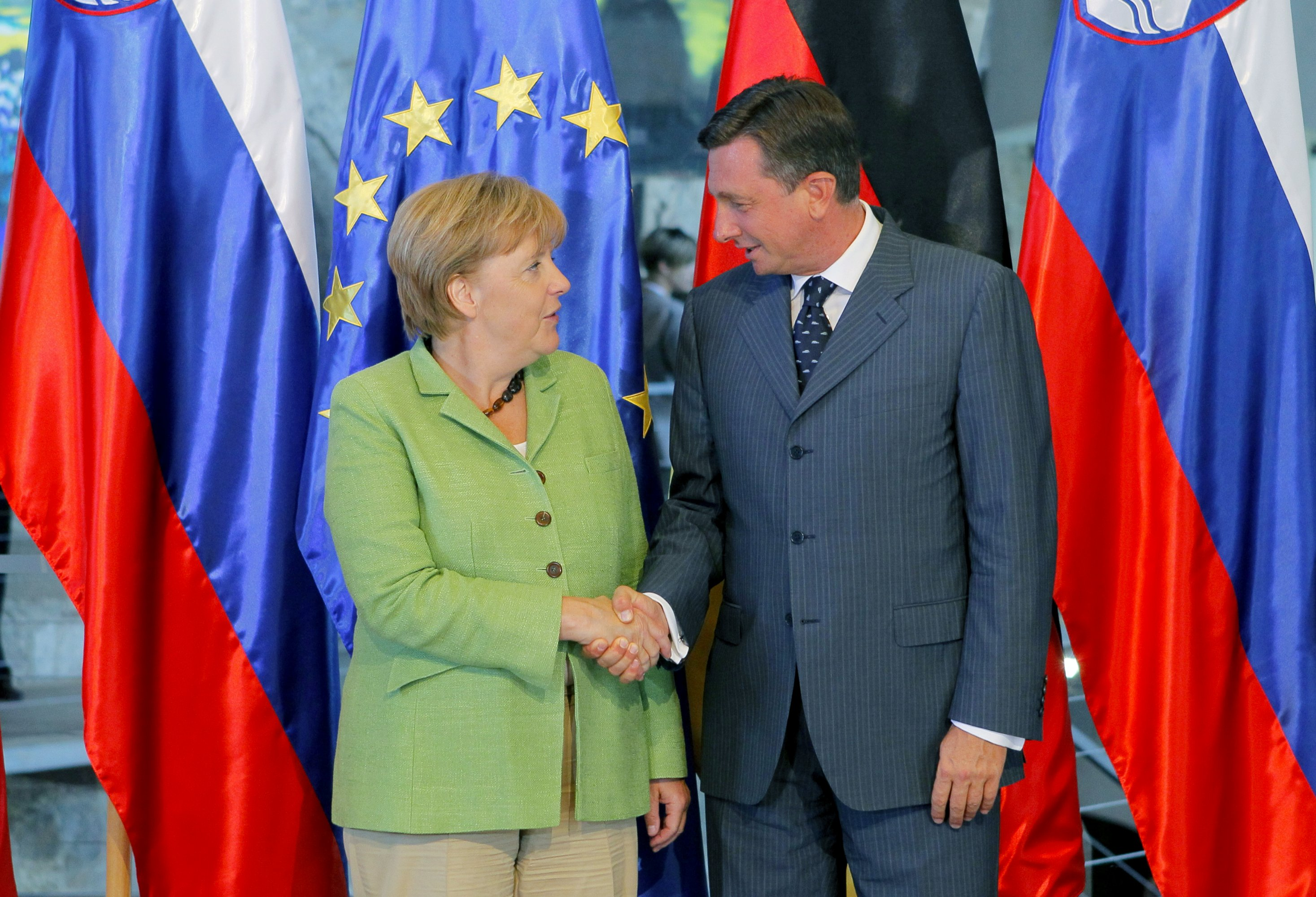
Pahor with German Chancellor Angela Merkel in Ljubljana, 30 August 2011

On 1 December 2011, several clips of the recordings of closed sessions of the Government of Slovenia during Borut Pahor's term were published on the video-sharing website YouTube.

=== 2011 elections and aftermath ===
On 4 December 2011 elections, under Pahor rule the party went from 29 to 10 (losing 19) seats at the early National Assembly election in comparison to the 2008 elections, but Pahor expressed "great contentment" with the result and explained that the party won "more votes than he expected". On 19 December 2011, while still in hospital due to otitis media, Pahor accepted the candidacy for the Speaker of the National Assembly after National Assembly election, but retracted it after two unsuccessful election rounds.

In June 2012, Pahor unsuccessfully ran for re-election as president of the Social Democrats. He was defeated by Igor Lukšič by a narrow margin. At the same party congress, Pahor announced he would run for President of Slovenia. A few days later, the party and its new president officially supported Pahor's candidacy for president. In September, the Civic List, a centrist party in the Slovenian center-right government coalition, also officially supported Pahor's candidacy for president.

== Presidency (2012–2022) ==
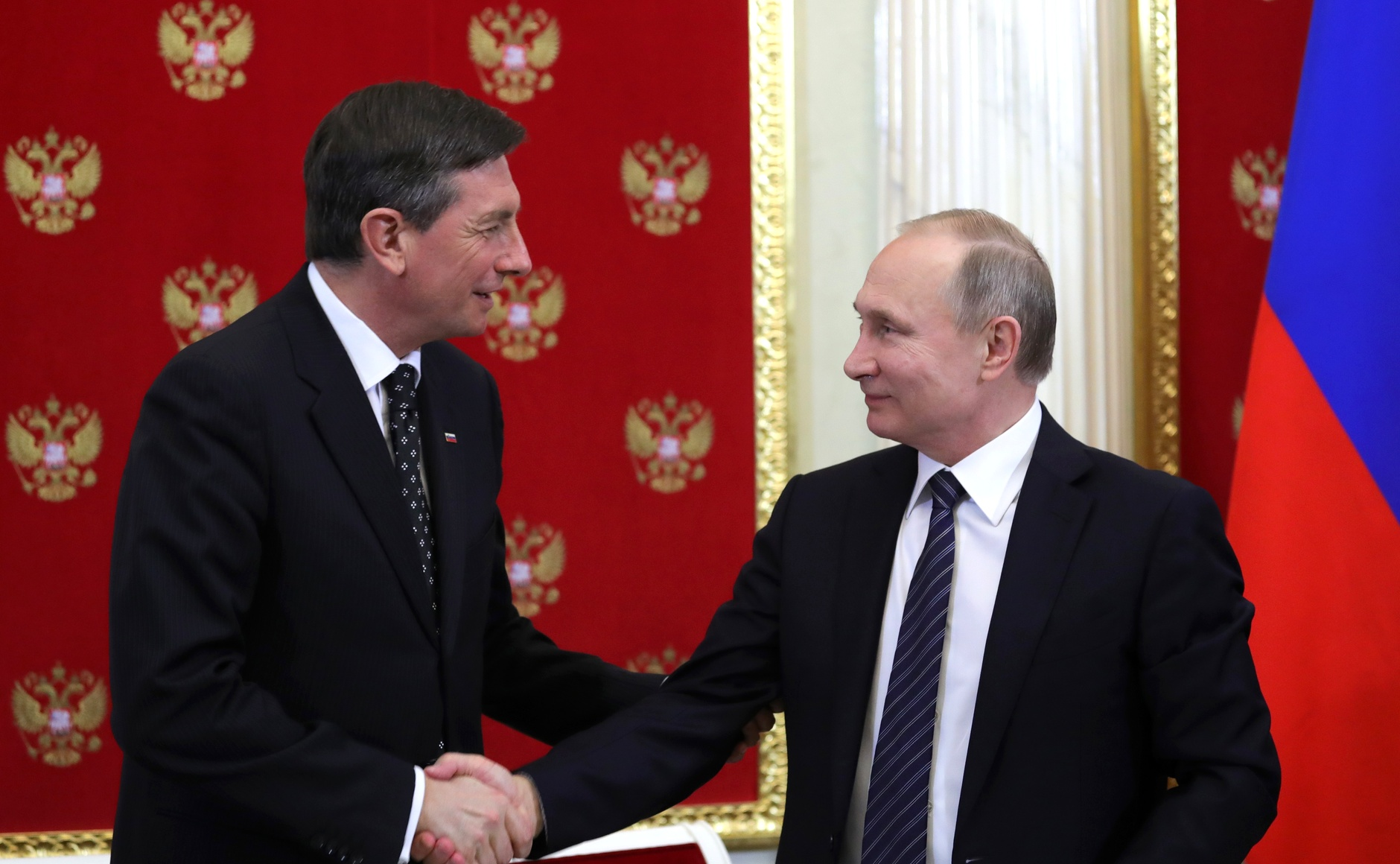
Pahor meeting with Russian President Vladimir Putin, 10 February 2017

=== 2012 presidential election ===
Pahor won the second round of the election with 67.3% of the vote.

The results were first announced in an exit poll by the Mediana Institute. The result was later confirmed at 67.4% for Pahor to 32.6% for Danilo Türk by the Electoral Commission of Slovenia, with 99.7% of the votes counted.

After the results were announced, Pahor reiterated that this was "only the beginning, the beginning of something new, a new hope, a new period." Pahor stressed that people need trust, respect, and tolerance. He stated he will keep the promises he made during the campaign and will keep working to help solve the problems the nation faces.

With this, he became the youngest President of Slovenia in history and the only politician to hold all three presidential positions in the Slovene political system: speaker of the National Assembly, prime minister, and president.

Pahor has tried taking a more active role. This has involved meeting youth at publicized events in the presidential offices in Ljubljana as well as appearing as a speaker in some major events in the country. He also met Vladimir Putin, whom he encouraged to try to resolve the Russo-Ukrainian war, and suggested a Trump-Putin meeting in Ljubljana, which has previously served as a venue for such occasion in 2001.

=== 2017 presidential election ===
Pahor won the second round with about 53 percent of the vote, with 99.9 percent of the votes counted, according to the Election Commission, while his opponent, Marjan Šarec, had 47 percent. Turnout was about 42 percent, according to preliminary figures, the lowest for a presidential election since Slovenia became an independent country in 1991.

== Awards and decorations ==
- Austria: Grand Star of the Decoration of Honour for Services to the Republic of Austria (8 December 2022)
- Bulgaria: Sash of the Order of the Balkan Mountains (25 July 2016)
- Cyprus: Grand Collar of the Order of Makarios III (9 January 2019)
- Czech Republic: Collar of the Order of the White Lion (28 October 2017)
- Estonia: Collar of the Order of the Cross of Terra Mariana (26 August 2019)
- Germany: Grand Cross Special Class of the Order of Merit of the Federal Republic of Germany (25 November 2014)
- Italy: Knight Grand Cross with Collar of the Order of Merit of the Italian Republic (5 May 2014)
- Latvia: Recipient of the Cross of Recognition First Class (5 June 2019)
- Norway: Grand Cross of the Order of St. Olav (6 November 2019)
- Portugal: Grand Collar of the Order of Prince Henry (31 May 2021)
- South Korea: Recipient of the Grand Order of Mugunghwa (21 September 2021)
- Ukraine: Member of the Order of Liberty (8 November 2016)
- Ukraine: Order of Prince Yaroslav the Wise, 1st class (21 September 2021)

== Personal life ==
Pahor and his domestic partner, Tanja Pečar, have a son, Luka. Apart from his native Slovene, he speaks fluent English, French, Italian, and Serbo-Croatian.

Party political offices
Preceded by Janez Kocijančič	Leader of the Social Democrats; 1996–2012	Succeeded by Igor Lukšič
Political offices
Preceded by Janez Podobnik	Speaker of the National Assembly; 2000–2004	Succeeded by Feri Horvat
Preceded by Janez Janša	Prime Minister of Slovenia; 2008–2012	Succeeded by Janez Janša
Preceded by Danilo Türk	President of Slovenia; 2012–2022	Succeeded by Nataša Pirc Musar
