= Presidential Palace, Ljubljana =

Government office building in Ljubljana, Slovenia

Presidential Palace
- Vladna in predsedniška palača
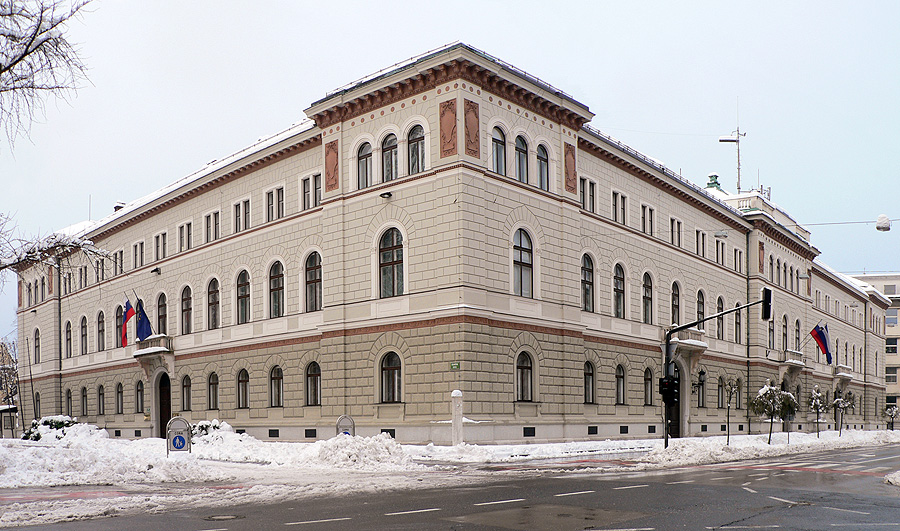
- Interactive map of the Presidential Palace area
- Alternative names: Government Palace, President's Office

General information
- Location: Center District, Ljubljana, Prešeren Street 8; Erjavec Street 17; Gregorčič Street 20, Slovenia
- Current tenants: President of Slovenia; Prime Minister of Slovenia; Protocol of Slovenia; Secretary-General of the Government of Slovenia
- Construction started: 1886
- Completed: 1899
- Renovated: 1985, 2007

The Presidential Palace (Slovene: Predsedniška palača), also the Government Palace (Vladna palača) or the President's Office (Urad predsednika), is a building in Ljubljana, the capital of Slovenia, that houses the Office of the President of Slovenia, the Secretary-General of the Government of Slovenia, and the Protocol of Slovenia. It stands at the corner of Prešeren Street (Prešernova cesta), Erjavec Street (Erjavčeva cesta), and Gregorčič Street (Gregorčičeva ulica) in the Center District, next to the Cankar Centre. It is used for state and ceremonial functions, as well as for receptions and meetings with visiting foreign dignitaries and heads of state. Occasionally, exhibits take place there.

== History ==
The project documentation for the building was prepared by the engineer Rudolf Bauer based on work by the architect Emil von Förster. The first excavations took place in October 1886; foundations were laid in spring 1897. The usage permit was issued on 11 November 1898. The building was at first used as the headquarters of the provincial Carniolan authorities. After World War II, it housed the Mayors of Ljubljana, the Constitutional Court and, since 1975, the Executive Council of the Socialist Republic of Slovenia. Since 1993 it has housed the Office of the President of the Republic of Slovenia, the Office of the Prime Minister of Slovenia and the Secretary-General of the Government of Slovenia. That year it was protected as a cultural monument.

== Architecture ==
The three-storey building was built in the Neo-Renaissance style and has an atrial ground plan. There are two courtyards and the great hall, called Crystal Hall, which is now used for receptions, but was originally a chapel. The front façade, turned towards Prešeren Street, has three entrances. On the sides of the main entrance, which is in the middle, stand the allegorical statues of power and law, created by the Viennese architect Josef Beyer. There are also two minor entrances at the front, one to each side of the main entrance. These entrances open to a busy city avenue and do not make an impression typical of a protocol building. In addition, there are entrances from Erjavec Street and Gregorčič Street. The corners of the building are emphasised by towers. The interior was decorated in the interwar period (20th century) by Gojmir Anton Kos with scenes from the history of Slovenia.
