= Milan Kučan =

First President of Slovenia (1991–2002)

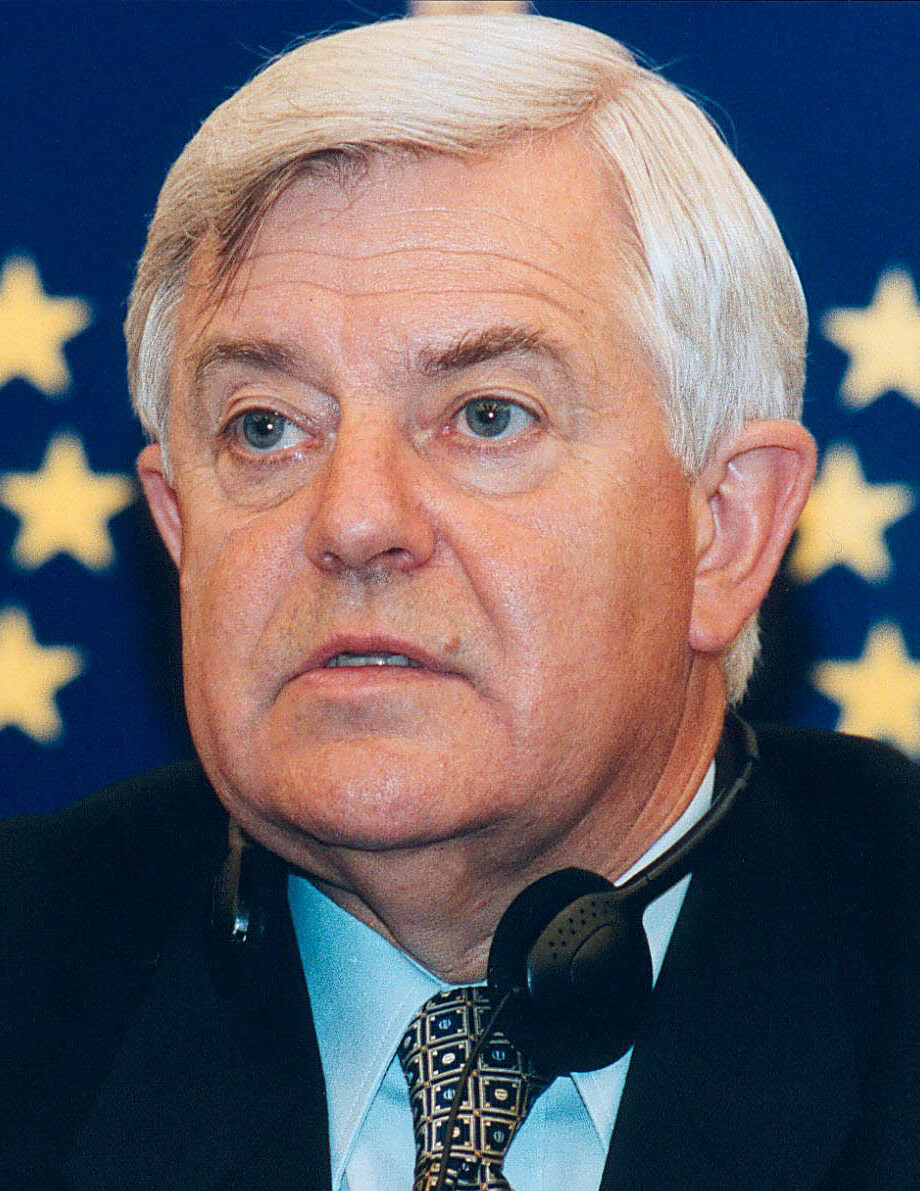
- Kučan in 2000

1st President of Slovenia
- In office 23 December 1991 – 22 December 2002
- Prime Minister: Lojze Peterle; Janez Drnovšek; Andrej Bajuk; Janez Drnovšek; Anton Rop
- Preceded by: Office established
- Succeeded by: Janez Drnovšek

13th President of the Presidency of Slovenia
- In office 10 May 1990 – 23 December 1991
- Prime Minister: Dušan Šinigoj; Lojze Peterle
- Preceded by: Janez Stanovnik
- Succeeded by: Himself (as President of Slovenia)

7th President of the League of Communists of Slovenia
- In office 19 April 1986 – 23 December 1989
- Preceded by: Andrej Marinc
- Succeeded by: Ciril Ribičič

Personal details
- Born: 14 January 1941 (age 85) Križevci, Yugoslavia (now Slovenia)
- Party: Social Democratic
- Other political affiliations: League of Communists of Yugoslavia (until 1991)
- Spouse: Štefka Kučan (m. 1964)
- Children: 2

Milan Kučan (pronounced [ˈmíːlaŋ ˈkúːtʃan]; born 14 January 1941) is a Slovenian former politician who served as the first President of Slovenia from 1991 to 2002. Before being president of Slovenia, he was the 13th President of the Presidency of SR Slovenia from 1990 to 1991.

Kučan also served as the 7th President of the League of Communists of Slovenia from 1986 to 1989.

== Early life and political beginnings ==
Kučan, one of five children, was born in a teachers' family. His parents were Koloman Küčan (1911–1944) and Marija Varga (1917–1975). He was raised in the village of Križevci, located in the largely agrarian border region of Prekmurje in the Drava Banovina of the Kingdom of Yugoslavia (present-day Slovenia). His father died during World War II. Kučan's family spent the war in occupied Serbia, where over 58,000 other Slovenians were resettled from Slovenia by the Germans.

He later studied law at the University of Ljubljana and soon became involved in the Communist political organizations of the time. In 1968, he became the president of the Slovenian Youth Association, then secretary of the Socialist Alliance of Working People of Slovenia (a central organization, created to unite all civil society associations under one roof) between 1974 and 1978. He rose to speaker of the National Assembly of Slovenia in 1978, and in 1982 he became representative for the Slovenian Communists in the League of Communists of Yugoslavia's Central Committee in Belgrade.

In May 1986, he became the leader of the League of Communists of Slovenia. At that time, liberal and democratic sentiment started to grow in Slovenia, as opposed to the political atmosphere of Belgrade and Serbia under Slobodan Milošević. Advocating in favour of human rights and European democratic values and principles, Kučan, his party and Slovenia faced increasingly severe political confrontations with Belgrade and Serbia. On 23 January 1990, Kučan and the Slovenian delegation left the Party Congress. This was one of the factors that eventually led to the collapse of the League of Communists of Yugoslavia, one of the pillars of the political system of the Socialist Yugoslavia.

== Political career ==
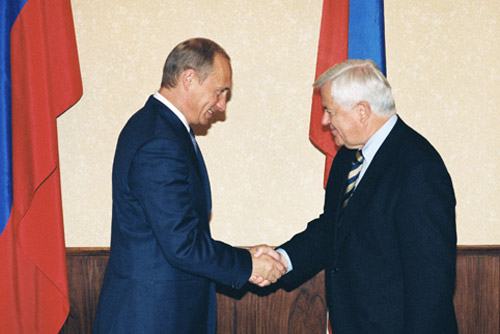
Kučan greeting Russian President Vladimir Putin, 22 September 2002

Slovenia was the first of the federal units of Yugoslavia to introduce multi-party democracy and the first multi-party elections were held in April 1990. Kučan was elected president of the presidency, then a collective body, in 1990, in a ballot against the DEMOS candidate Jože Pučnik.

Kučan strongly opposed the preservation of Yugoslavia through violent means. After the concept of a loose confederation had failed to gain support by the republics of Yugoslavia, Kučan favoured a controlled process of non-violent disassociation that would enable the collaboration of the former Yugoslav nations on a new, different basis.

Slovenia declared its independence on 25 June 1991. In his speech on the occasion, Kučan ended with the words: "Today dreams are allowed, tomorrow is a new day." On 26 June, the Yugoslav People's Army embarked on troop movements that later escalated into the Ten-Day War. As the peace talks began at Brioni, with the European Community as a mediator, the army started its withdrawal from Slovenia. Kučan represented Slovenia at the peace conference on former Yugoslavia in The Hague and Brussels which concluded that the former Yugoslav nations were free to determine their future as independent states. On 22 May 1992 Kučan represented Slovenia as it became a new member of the United Nations.

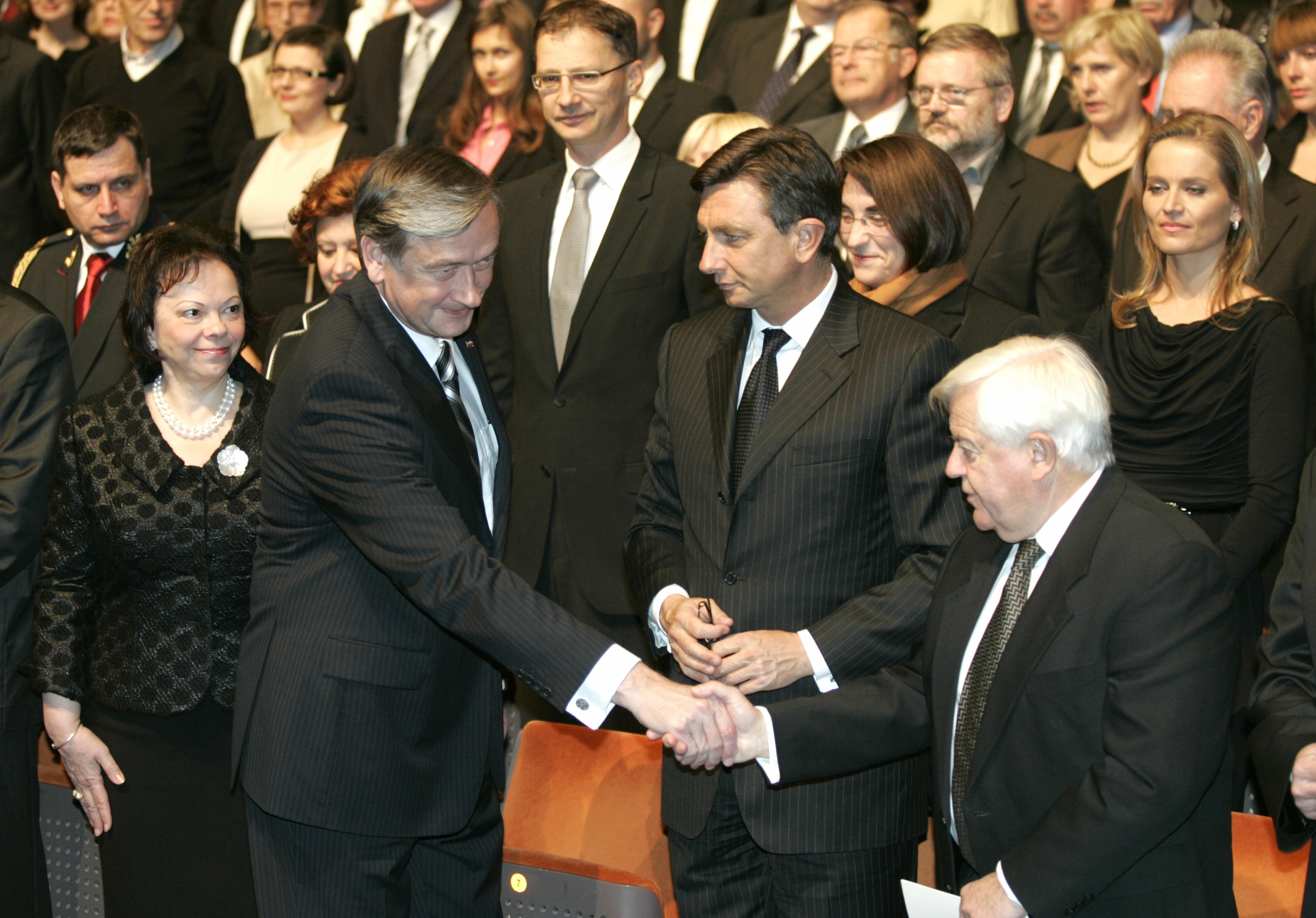
Kučan at the 2010 state commemoration of the Reformation day with Danilo Türk (left) and Borut Pahor (center)

After the independence and the international recognition of Slovenia, Kučan was elected as the first President of Slovenia in 1992 with the support of the citizens list. He won another five-year term in 1997–2002, running again as an independent and again winning the majority in the first round. His presidency ended in December 2002. He was succeeded as president by Janez Drnovšek. In March 2003 Slovenia held two referendums on joining the European Union and NATO. Milan Kučan took an active part in campaigning for these memberships, in order for Slovenia to achieve the goals it had set upon its independence. In May 2004, Slovenia became a full member of both the EU and NATO.

Since November 2004, Kučan has been a member of the Club of Madrid, an association of former democratic statesmen that works to strengthen democratic governance. He chairs the International Collegium together with Michel Rocard, former French Prime Minister. Since 2004 he is the chairman of Forum 21, a Slovene left-wing think-tank reflecting on issues of relevance for the future development of Slovenia and its position in a global society.

Kučan is also a member of the European Council on Tolerance and Reconciliation, a not-for-profit organization established in 2008 to monitor tolerance in Europe and make recommendations on fighting xenophobia and intolerance on the continent.

== Personal life ==
Kučan married Štefka Kučan in 1964. The couple have two daughters: Ana, a landscape architect and professor at the University of Ljubljana, and Špela, an anthropologist and ethnologist. In 1991, Kučan stated it is the duty of every Slovene to climb Mount Triglav.

== Honours and awards ==
- (Italy) : Knight Grand Cross of the Order of Merit of the Italian Republic (1992)
- (Vatican City) : Grand Cross of the Order of Pope Pius IX (1993)
- (Sovereign Military Order of Malta) : Collar of the Order pro Merito Melitensi (1995)
- : Grand Cross of the Order of Merit of the Republic of Hungary (1997)
- (Estonia) : Collar of the Order of the Cross of Terra Mariana (1997)
- (Greece) : Order of the Redeemer (1999)
- (Portugal) : Grand Collar of the Order of Infante Dom Henrique (2000)
- (Croatia) : Grand Cross of the Grand Order of King Tomislav (5 December 2001)
- (Slovakia) : Grand Cross (or 1st Class) of the Order of the White Double Cross (2001)
- (United Kingdom) : Grand Cross of the Order of St Michael and St George (2001)
- (Spain) : Collar of the Order of Isabella the Catholic (2002)
- : Order of the Star of Romania (2002)
- (Latvia) : Commander Grand Cross with Chain of the Order of Three Stars (2002)
- (Poland) : Knight of the Order of the White Eagle (2002)
- (Denmark) : Knight of the Order of the Elephant (2001)
- : Gold Medal of the Order of Freedom of the Republic of Slovenia (2003)

Party political offices
Preceded by Andrej Marinc	Chairman of the League of Communists of Slovenia; 1986–1990	Succeeded by Position Abolished
Political offices
Preceded by Janez Stanovnik as President of the Socialist Republic of Slovenia	President of Slovenia; 1990–2002	Succeeded by Janez Drnovšek
