= President of Slovenia =

Head of state

President of the Republic of Slovenia
- Predsednik Republike Slovenije
- Naval flag of the President

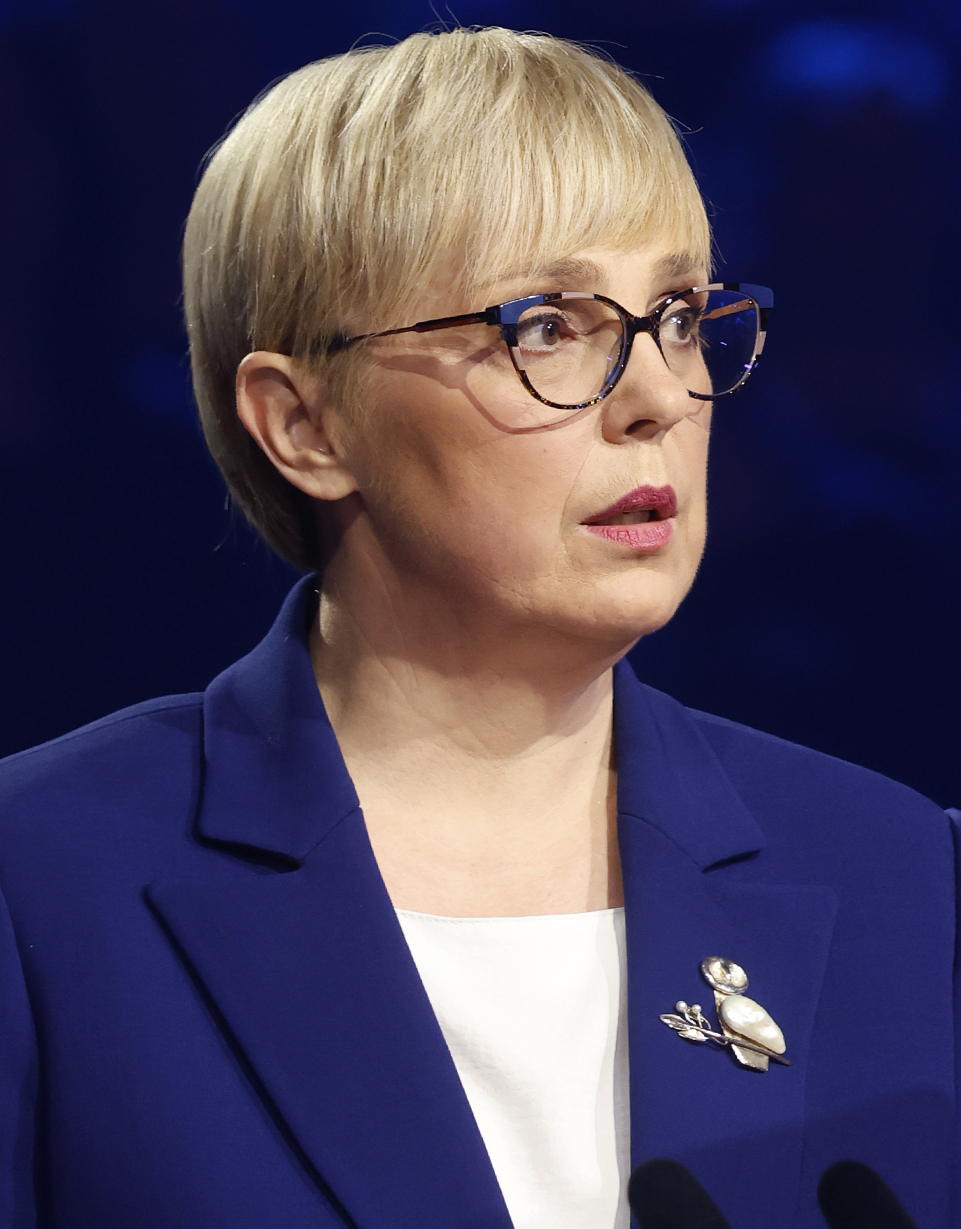
- Incumbent; Nataša Pirc Musar since 23 December 2022
- Office of the President of the Republic
- Style: Mrs. President (Slovene: Gospa predsednica) (informal); Her Excellency (Slovene: Njena ekscelenca) (diplomatic)
- Type: Head of state Commander in chief
- Member of: National Security Council (upon invitation of the Prime Minister)
- Reports to: National Assembly
- Residence: Presidential Palace
- Seat: Gregorčičeva 25; 1000 Ljubljana; Predsedniška palača
- Appointer: Popular vote
- Term length: Five years, renewable once consecutively
- Constituting instrument: Constitution of Slovenia (1991)
- Inaugural holder: Milan Kučan
- Formation: 10 May 1990; 36 years ago (de facto); 23 December 1991; 34 years ago (de jure)
- Deputy: Speaker of the National Assembly (as acting president)
- Salary: €5,419 monthly
- Website: Official website

Naprej, zastava slave
"Forward, Flag of Glory" from the 19th century; known as the Song of the President of Slovenia

The president of Slovenia, officially the president of the Republic of Slovenia (Slovene: Predsednik Republike Slovenije), is the head of state of Slovenia. The office was established on 23 December 1991 when the National Assembly passed a new constitution after the separation of Slovenia from the Socialist Federal Republic of Yugoslavia. Five individuals have occupied the post of president of the Republic since Slovenia achieved its independence. The incumbent is Nataša Pirc Musar, Slovenia's first female president. The president's official workplace is the Presidential Palace in Ljubljana.

== Election and term of office ==
The president is directly elected by universal adult suffrage for a term of five years. Any Slovenian citizen of legal age (18 or more) may run for President, but may only be elected to office for two consecutive terms.

The president has no legally guaranteed immunity and may be impeached during their time in office.

== Duties and functions ==
The president of the Republic is the highest representative of the Slovenian state, belonging neither to the legislative, executive, judicial, nor constitutive branches of state power. The president instead occupies a completely separate but coequal moderating branch by virtue of Article 102 of the Constitution. To this end, the president represents Slovenia abroad, fosters national unity at home, and exercises supreme command and control over the Armed Forces of Slovenia as commander-in-chief. In the performance of these functions, the president upholds the rule of law and, through their ongoing mediation and arbitration, guarantees the continuity and orderly operation of Slovenia's democratic institutions. This stabilising and integrative role is in keeping with the president's solemn oath taken at inauguration to "...uphold the constitutional order,…act according to my conscience and…do all in my power for the good of Slovenia".

The Constitution of Slovenia provides for a parliamentary system of government, whereby the presidency is a predominantly ceremonial institution with limited political power. Indeed, unlike in most parliamentary republics, the president is not even the nominal chief executive. Rather, the executive authority of Slovenia is explicitly vested in the Government with the prime minister as its head. Nevertheless, both the National Assembly and the Government are obliged as a matter of law and by the terms of their own standing orders to keep the president fully informed on matters of state, be they foreign or domestic. Moreover, the functions conferred on the president by the Constitution and subordinate statute law require neither the countersignature of the prime minister nor the advice of the Government to be effective. (Note: Refer to "Representative function", "Relationship with the government", and "Information" in Part III of the Ribaric report.) Thus, the powers and duties at the president's disposal are generally exercised either in their complete discretion, after consultation with or on the proposal of the Government (with the right to refuse a proposal and to act contrary to any advice tendered), or in accordance with constitutional restrictions in the case of certain ministerial functions.

=== Legislative functions ===
Convene regular sessions of the National Assembly
The president of the Republic has the power to call both general and by-elections to the National Assembly and to convene its first regular session following a general election, provided general elections must be called no later than fifteen days before the expiry of four years from the date of the first session of the outgoing National Assembly. Likewise, if the president dissolves the National Assembly before the expiration of its mandate and calls for snap elections, a new National Assembly must be elected no later than two months after the dissolution of the previous one. The term of the old National Assembly otherwise comes to an end by default upon the first session of a new National Assembly, which must be convoked by the president no later than twenty days after a general election.

Convene extraordinary sessions of the National Assembly
The president of the Republic may convene an extraordinary session of the National Assembly. The calling together of an extraordinary session of the National Assembly concurrently reconvenes the National Council, the upper house of Slovenia's incompletely bicameral Parliament.

Dissolve the National Assembly and call snap elections
The president has plenary authority to dissolve the National Assembly before the expiration of its term and call snap elections, but only if either of the following conditions are met:

1. The National Assembly fails to elect a prime minister within 30 days from the start of a new parliamentary session; or
2. The National Assembly passes a vote of no confidence in the Government and fails to elect a new prime minister within 30 days.

Express opinions to the National Assembly
The president of the Republic may, on their own initiative or whenever requested by the National Assembly, express an opinion on any matter of national import.

Promulgate laws
The president of the Republic promulgates each law passed by the National Assembly within eight days of its enactment, unless the law is sooner vetoed by the National Council. The president does not have the discretion to refuse laws duly passed by the National Assembly and agreed to by the National Council.

=== Executive functions ===
Nominate the prime minister
The president of the Republic nominates for the consideration of the National Assembly a candidate for prime minister, after consultation with the leaders of the various political parties represented in the National Assembly. The National Assembly in turn elects or rejects the president's nominee. If the National Assembly fails to elect a prime minister on the first round, the president may nominate one or more additional candidates for the consideration of the National Assembly in subsequent rounds, including a previously nominated candidate. This process continues until a prime minister is duly elected or the National Assembly is dissolved.

Nominate and appoint certain other state officials
The president of the Republic nominates for the consideration of the National Assembly the governor of the Central Bank of Slovenia, the members of the Court of Audit, and the Human Rights Ombudsman. The National Assembly in turn confirms or rejects the candidates so nominated. If confirmed, the nominees are formally appointed to office by the president.

Represent Slovenia in foreign relations
The president of the Republic acts as Slovenia's supreme representative in international affairs. In this capacity, the president appoints and recalls Slovenian ambassadors and envoys, accepts the credentials of foreign diplomats accredited to Slovenia, and both pays and receives state visits. Pursuant to Articles 14 and 59 of the Foreign Affairs Act, the president also decides on the opening and closure of diplomatic missions. In the performance of these duties, the president is required by law to consult the foreign minister in order to ensure a coordinated and effective foreign policy. (Note: Refer to Article 4 of the Foreign Affairs Act.) The president is nevertheless not obliged to follow any of the foreign minister's opinions, proposals, requests, or recommendations. Indeed, the president may act contrary to such advice. In a similar vein, the president is empowered to issue instruments of ratification, whereby Slovenia expresses its consent as a sovereign state to be bound by treaty under international law. Despite this authority, the president's ability to refuse a treaty is limited. Treaty negotiation and conclusion is the responsibility of the Government, whereas ratification itself rests exclusively with the National Assembly. Nevertheless, before affixing their instrument of ratification to any treaty, the president may request the Constitutional Court to opine on the treaty's constitutionality. If the Constitutional Court concludes the treaty violates the Constitution, the treaty is deemed null and void. If the Constitutional Court finds the treaty is however in compliance with the Constitution, the president must issue an instrument of ratification.

Serve as Commander-in-Chief
Supreme command and control of the Slovenian Armed Forces vests in the president of the Republic as commander-in-chief. To this end, the president has plenary authority to declare a state of emergency and to declare a state of war if Slovenia is under attack. However, the president may exercise these broad powers only if the National Assembly is for whatever reason unable to convene. Other duties have been conferred on the president by virtue of Slovenia's Defense Act. For example, the president:

1. commissions all generals, admirals, and other commissioned officers of the Armed Forces;
2. approves the annual guidelines prepared by the defense minister and submitted to the chief of the General Staff detailing the operational strategy, materiel needs, and organizational plans of the Armed Forces;
3. prescribes the conditions and procedures for keeping him or herself informed about the state of readiness of the Armed Forces and other matters relevant to the defence of the state;
4. receives regular briefings from the Intelligence and Security Service;
5. adopts regulations with the force of law for the purpose of administering the activities of the Armed Forces, including matters of military justice, but only on the proposal of the Government;
6. orders the mobilisation of the Armed Forces, but only on the proposal of the Government; and
7. decides upon the use and deployment of the Armed Forces, the enforcement of work and material duty, and (during a state of emergency) their total mobilisation.

Issue decrees in times of national crisis
The president of the Republic may, at the request of the Government, issue decrees with the force of law. Said decrees may, in exception, restrict individual human rights and fundamental freedoms otherwise guaranteed by Article 16 of the Constitution. The president's authority to make such decrees is only valid when the National Assembly is unable to convene and a state of war or emergency has been invoked. (Note: For this reason, the speaker of the National Assembly is required by Article 33 of the National Assembly Act to inform the president whenever the National Assembly is unable to convene.) The president may accept or refuse the Government's request.

=== Judicial functions ===
Exercise the prerogative of clemency
The president of the Republic may, in their discretion, grant general or special pardons, commutations, reprieves, and respites to individuals convicted of criminal violations in Slovenian courts. The president may choose to appoint a commission of experts to consult him or herself in the review of applications, but the prerogative of clemency is ultimately the president's alone.

Nominate justices of the Constitutional Court
The president of the Republic nominates for the consideration of the National Assembly the nine justices of the Constitutional Court, who each serve staggered nonrenewable terms of nine years. The National Assembly in turn elects or rejects the candidates so nominated.

Nominate members of the Judicial Council
The president of the Republic nominates for the consideration of the National Assembly five out of the eleven members of the Judicial Council. (Note: The Judicial Council is an independent public body responsible for the administration of the courts, including the recruitment of judges qualified by merit and their discipline.) Nominees must be university professors of law, senior counsel, or attorneys accepted to the State Bar. The National Assembly in turn elects or rejects the candidates so nominated. Members of the Judicial Council serve staggered terms of six years upon confirmation, with either two or three of the presidentially nominated members subject to reelection every three years.

Nominate Slovenian judges to international courts
The president of the Republic nominates for the consideration of the National Assembly Slovenia's judges on the European Court of Justice, the European Court of Human Rights, and the International Criminal Court. The National Assembly in turn elects or rejects the candidates so nominated.

Confer and revoke state honours
The president of the Republic is Slovenia's fount of honour. In this capacity, the president confers state honours on individuals for contributions to civil society, diplomacy and international affairs, and national security. Pursuant to the Act on Decorations of the Republic of Slovenia, state honours take the form of various medals and national orders, are conferred and revoked by decree, and are awarded at the president's discretion. Nevertheless, state authorities, local government authorities, organizations and citizens of the Republic of Slovenia may propose candidates for the president's consideration. Likewise, a Slovenian citizen cannot accept a foreign honour without the president's consent.

== List of presidents of Slovenia ==
=== Socialist Republic of Slovenia ===
Parties

ZKS ZLSD

| No. | Portrait | Name (Birth–Death) | Term of office | | Political party |
|---|---|---|---|---|---|
Presidents of the People's Assembly; 1953–1974
| 1 | | Ferdo Kozak (1894–1957) | 30 January 1953 | 15 December 1953 | ZKS |
| 2 | | Miha Marinko (1900–1983) | 15 December 1953 | 9 June 1962 | ZKS |
| 3 | | Vida Tomšič (1913–1998) | 9 June 1962 | 25 June 1963 | ZKS |
| 4 | | Ivan Maček (1908–1993) | 25 June 1963 | 9 May 1967 | ZKS |
| 5 | | Sergej Kraigher (1914–2001) | 9 May 1967 | 1973 | ZKS |
| 6 | | Tone Kropušek (1928–2017) | 1973 | 1974 | ZKS |
| 7 | | Marijan Brecelj (1910–1989) | 1974 | 9 May 1974 | ZKS |
Presidents of the Presidency; 1974–1991
| (5) | | Sergej Kraigher (1914–2001) | 9 May 1974 | 23 May 1979 | ZKS |
| 8 | | Viktor Avbelj (1914–1993) | 23 May 1979 | 7 May 1984 | ZKS |
| 9 | | France Popit (1921–2013) | 7 May 1984 | 6 May 1988 | ZKS |
| 10 | | Janez Stanovnik (1922–2020) | 6 May 1988 | 10 May 1990 | ZKS |
| 10 | | Janez Stanovnik (1922–2020) | 6 May 1988 | 10 May 1990 | ZLSD |
| 11 | | Milan Kučan (born 1941) | 10 May 1990 | 23 December 1991 | ZLSD |

=== Republic of Slovenia ===
Parties

SD LDS Independent

| No. | Portrait | Name (Birth–Death) | Term of office | | | Political Party | Elected |
| No. | Portrait | Name (Birth–Death) | Took office | Left office | Time in office | Political Party | Elected |
|---|---|---|---|---|---|---|---|
Presidents; 1991–present
| 1 | Milan Kučan | Milan Kučan (born 1941) | 23 December 1991 | 22 December 2002 | 10 years, 364 days | SD; Independent | 1990; 1992; 1997 |
| 2 | Janez Drnovšek | Janez Drnovšek (1950–2008) | 22 December 2002 | 23 December 2007 | 5 years, 1 day | LDS; Independent | 2002 |
| 3 | Danilo Türk | Danilo Türk (born 1952) | 23 December 2007 | 22 December 2012 | 4 years, 365 days | Independent | 2007 |
| 4 | Borut Pahor | Borut Pahor (born 1963) | 22 December 2012 | 22 December 2022 | 10 years | SD; Independent | 2012; 2017 |
| 5 | Nataša Pirc Musar | Nataša Pirc Musar (born 1968) | 23 December 2022 | Incumbent | 3 years, 315 days | Independent | 2022 |

== See also ==
- Prime Minister of Slovenia
