= List of automobile manufacturers of the Czech Republic =

This is a list of automobile current and defunct automobile manufacturers of the Czech Republic (and Czechoslovakia and Bohemia).

== Current manufacturers ==
- Praga (1907–present) (racing - karts - sports cars)
- Škoda Auto (1925–present)
- Kaipan (1992—present) (roadsters)
- Gordon Roadster (1997-present) (sports cars)
- MWM (2017–present) (electric vintage Luca EV car)
- Sigma Motor (2018-present) (engineering - manufacturing)

=== Foreign manufacturers building in the Czech Republic ===
- Hyundai Motor Manufacturing Czech (2008–present)
- Toyota Motor Manufacturing Czech Republic (2002–present)

== Former manufacturers ==
- Aero (1929–1947)
- AKA (1925)
- Aspa (1924–1925)
- Avia (1919–present) (no longer manufactures cars)
- Enka (1928–1930)
- Gatter Autowerk Reichstadt (1930–1937)
- Jawa Moto (1919–present) (no longer manufactures cars)
- Laurin & Klement (1895–1925) (acquired by Škoda Auto)
- MTX (1969–present) (no longer manufactures cars)
- Ocelot Auto (1994–2010)
- Petera & Sons (1907–1946) (coachbuilder in Vrchlabí)
- Reichenberger Automobil Fabrik (1907–1916, acquired by Laurin & Klement)
- Rösler & Jauernig (1896–1908)
- Sodomka (1925–1948) (coachbuilder incorporated into Karosa in 1948)
- Stelka
- Tatra (1850–present) (no longer manufactures cars)
- Velorex (1950–1971)
- Velox (1906–1910)
- Walter (1911–1954)
- Wikov (1918–1945)
- Zbrojovka Brno (1924–1937)

== See also ==
- List of automobile manufacturers
- List of automobile marques
