= List of companies of Slovenia =

Location of Slovenia

Slovenia is a nation state in southern Central Europe, located at the crossroads of main European cultural and trade routes. The economy of Slovenia is small, open, and export-oriented and has been strongly influenced by international conditions. It has been severely hurt by the Eurozone crisis, which started in the late 2000s. The main economic field is services, followed by industry and construction.

For further information on the types of business entities in this country and their abbreviations, see "Business entities in Slovenia".

== Notable firms ==
This list includes notable companies with primary headquarters located in the country. The industry and sector follow the Industry Classification Benchmark taxonomy. Organizations which have ceased operations are included and noted as defunct.

Notable companies Status: P=Private, S=State; A=Active, D=Defunct
Name	Industry	Sector	Headquarters	Founded	Notes	Status	
Academa	Technology	Software	Ljubljana	1992	Internet, software development	P	A
Adria Airways	Consumer services	Airlines	Zgornji Brnik	1961	National airline, defunct 2019	P	D
Adria Mobil	Consumer goods	Automobiles	Novo Mesto	1965	Motorhomes	P	A
Akrapovič	Consumer goods	Automobiles	Ivančna Gorica	1990	Automotive	P	A
Alpina Žiri	Consumer goods	Footwear	Žiri	1948	Sport and fashion footwear	P	A
Amebis	Technology	Software	Kamnik	2012	Language technology	P	A
AMIS	Telecommunications	Fixed line telecommunications	Maribor	1995	Internet service provider	P	D
BTC	Consumer services	Broadline retailers	Ljubljana	1954	Retail complex	P	A
Elan	Consumer goods	Recreational products	Begunje na Gorenjskem	1945	Sports equipment	P	A
Goodyear Dunlop Sava Tires	Consumer goods	Automobiles	Kranj	1998	Tires, part of Goodyear Tire and Rubber Company (US)	P	A
Gorenje	Consumer goods	Durable household products	Velenje	1950	Household appliances and personal electronics	P	A
Holding Slovenske elektrarne	Utilities	Conventional electricity	Ljubljana	2001	Electrical distributor, state-owned	S	A
Iskra (company)	Industrials	Diversified industrials	Kranj	1946	Defunct 1990	P	D
Istrabenz	Conglomerates	-	Koper	1948	Food and beverage, financials, travel & leisure, energy	P	A
Krka	Health care	Pharmaceuticals	Novo Mesto	1954	Pharmaceuticals	P	A
Litostroj Power	Industrials	Industrial machinery	Ljubljana	1946	Heavy machinery	P	A
Ljubljana Jože Pučnik Airport	Industrials	Transportation services	Ljubljana	1963	Airport	P	A
Mercator	Consumer services	Food retailers & wholesalers	Ljubljana	1949	Supermarkets	P	A
Mobitel	Telecommunications	Mobile telecommunications	Ljubljana	1991	Defunct mobile provider, merged into Telekom Slovenije	P	D
Petrol Group	Consumer services	Specialty retailers	Ljubljana	1947	Oil retailer	P	A
Port of Koper	Industrials	Transportation services	Koper	1957	Port	P	A
Post of Slovenia	Industrials	Delivery services	Maribor	1995	Postal service	S	A
Slovenian Railways	Industrials	Railroads	Ljubljana	1991	State railway	S	A
Slovenija ceste Tehnika	Industrials	Construction & materials	Ljubljana	1943	Construction, civil engineering, defunct 2015	P	D
Solinair	Consumer services	Airlines	Ljubljana	1991	Airline, part of MNG Airlines (Turkey)	P	A
Telekom Slovenije	Telecommunications	Fixed-line telecommunications	Ljubljana	1995	Telecom	S	A
Tomos	Consumer goods	Automobiles	Koper	1954	Mopeds, motors, defunct 2019	P	D
XLAB d.o.o	Technology	Software	Ljubljana	2001	Software development	P	A
Zavarovalnica Triglav	Financials	Full line insurance	Ljubljana	1900	Insurance	P	A
ZootFly	Technology	Software	Ljubljana	2002	Video games	P	A

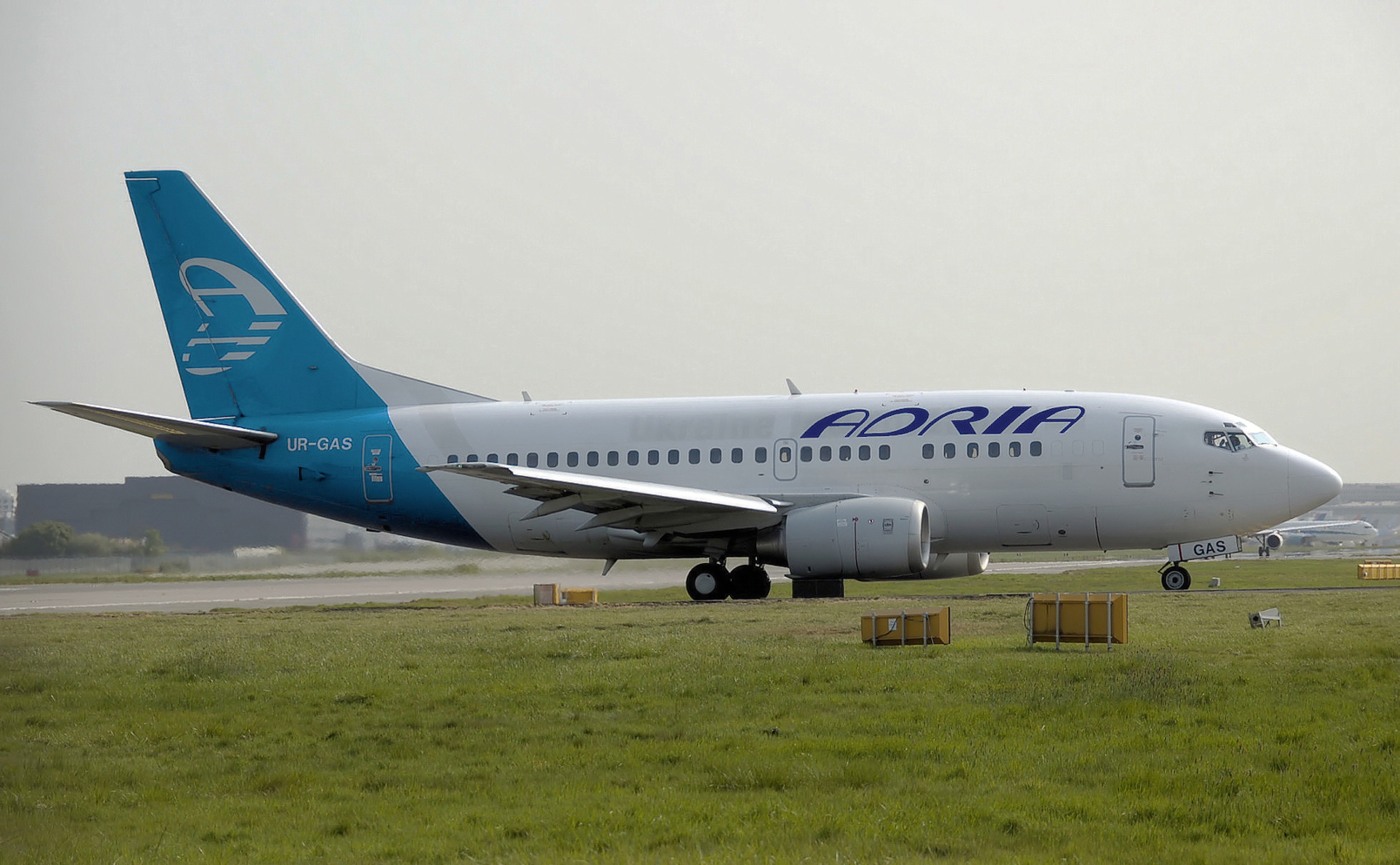
Adria Airways Boeing 737-500

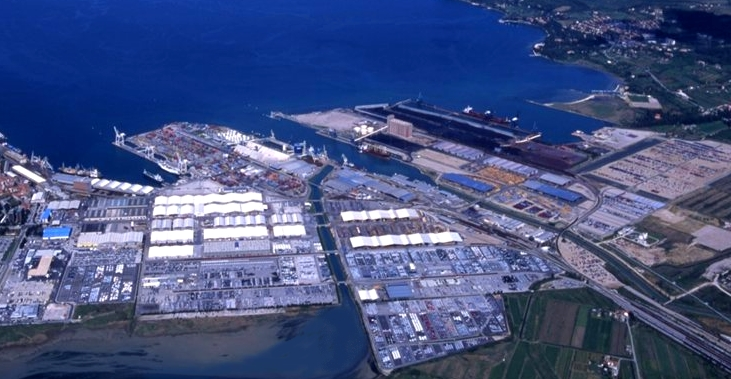
The Port of Koper

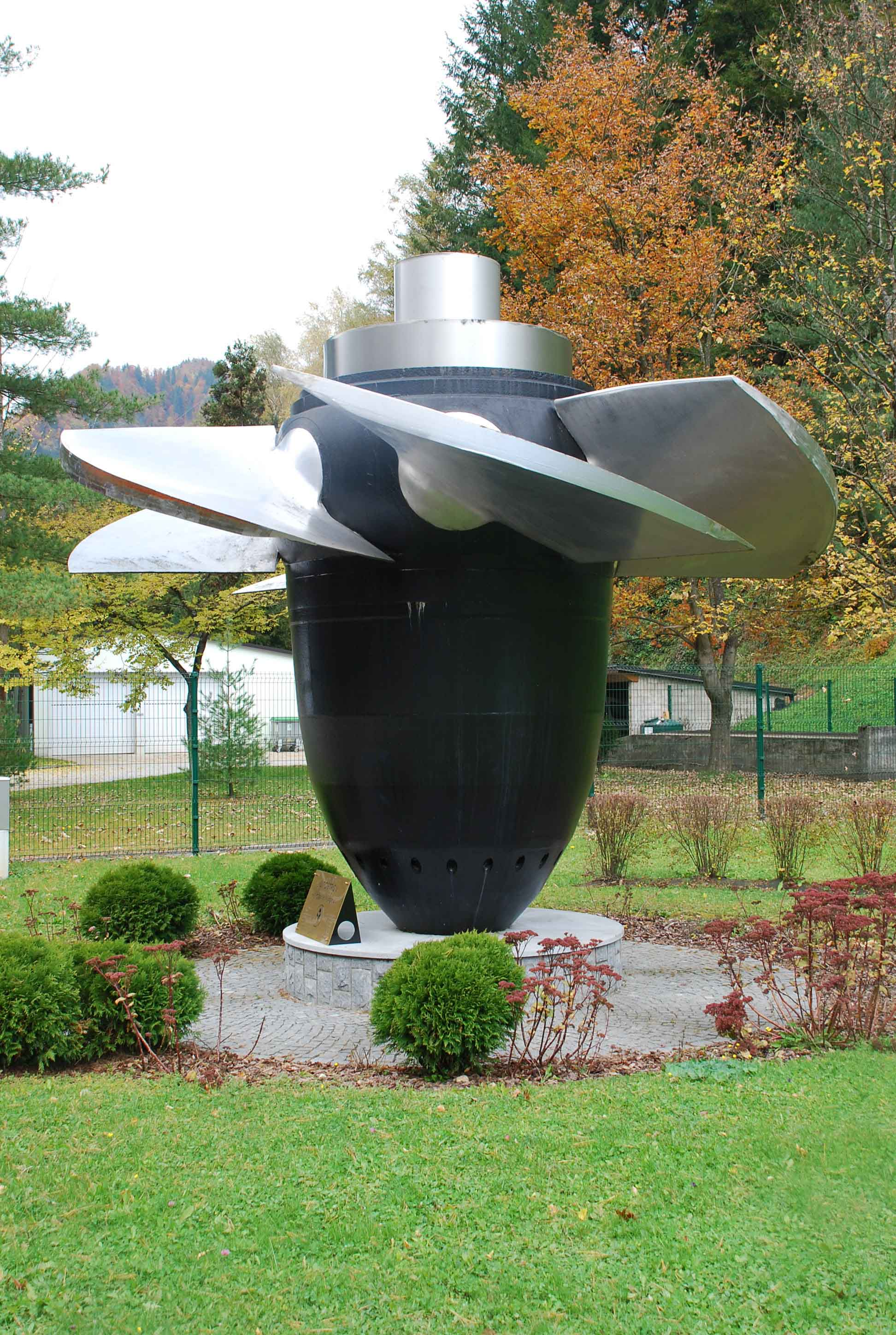
Kaplan turbine built by Litostroj

== See also ==
- Economy of Slovenia
- List of banks in Slovenia
