= Enka (car) =

Frantisek Kolanda a spol., tovarna na automobily
- Industry: Automotive
- Founded: 1926
- Founder: Břetislav Novotný & František Kolanda
- Defunct: 1929
- Headquarters: Prague, Czech Republic
- Products: Automobiles

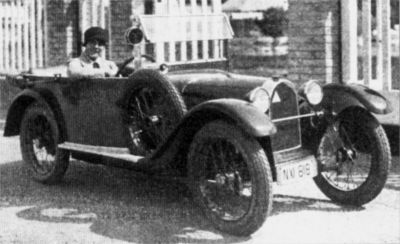
Enka Cabriolet

František Kolanda a spol., továrna na automobily was a Czech automobile manufacturer. The production was discontinued after developing their only car model called Enka.

== History ==
Břetislav Novotný was one of the best known car designers in the country, previously designed both the Novo and Omega prototype before working with Zbrojovka Brno which produced cars under the brand name Disk. He departed from the company in 1925 and moved to Prague to construct his own car. From 1926 to 1927, he started designing a prototype at the workshop of the Varvařovský company in the Holešovice district. He moved onto another company, Košař with the body being produced in the Kobylisy district. An investor František Kolanda, from a Prague printing business family, joined the company and became the director of the commercial affairs. With this new funding, the company was able to move to a new location over at the Karlín district. The company was then renamed to František Kolanda a spol., továrna na automobily. The brand name Enka (also spelled as EnKa and ENKA) was made by combining phonetic initials of Novotný and Kolanda.

Production ended in 1929 after about 20 (65 according to some sources) examples were produced. Aero later took over the project and developed its first model, the Aero 10 (aka Aero 500). Around 4 examples are said to still exist with one in the collection of the National Technical Museum in Prague and one with Weymann coachwork.

== Vehicles ==
=== Prototype ===
The first prototype was powered by a 350cc single-cylinder air-cooled engine with friction gears, before changing to a traditional three-speed transmission integrated in the rear axle. The wheelbase was no shorter than 3,000 mm. The open two-seater body had no doors and a fake grille to cover the air-cooled engine. The air-cooled engine was proven to be economical and had good climbing ability, reaching a top speed of 50 km/h (31 mph) but was hindered by the poor ride quality due to the quarter-elliptical spring suspensions.

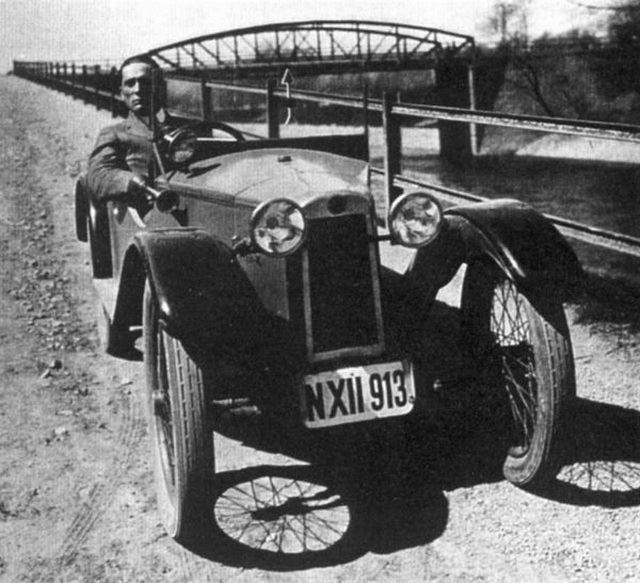
1927 Enka prototype front view

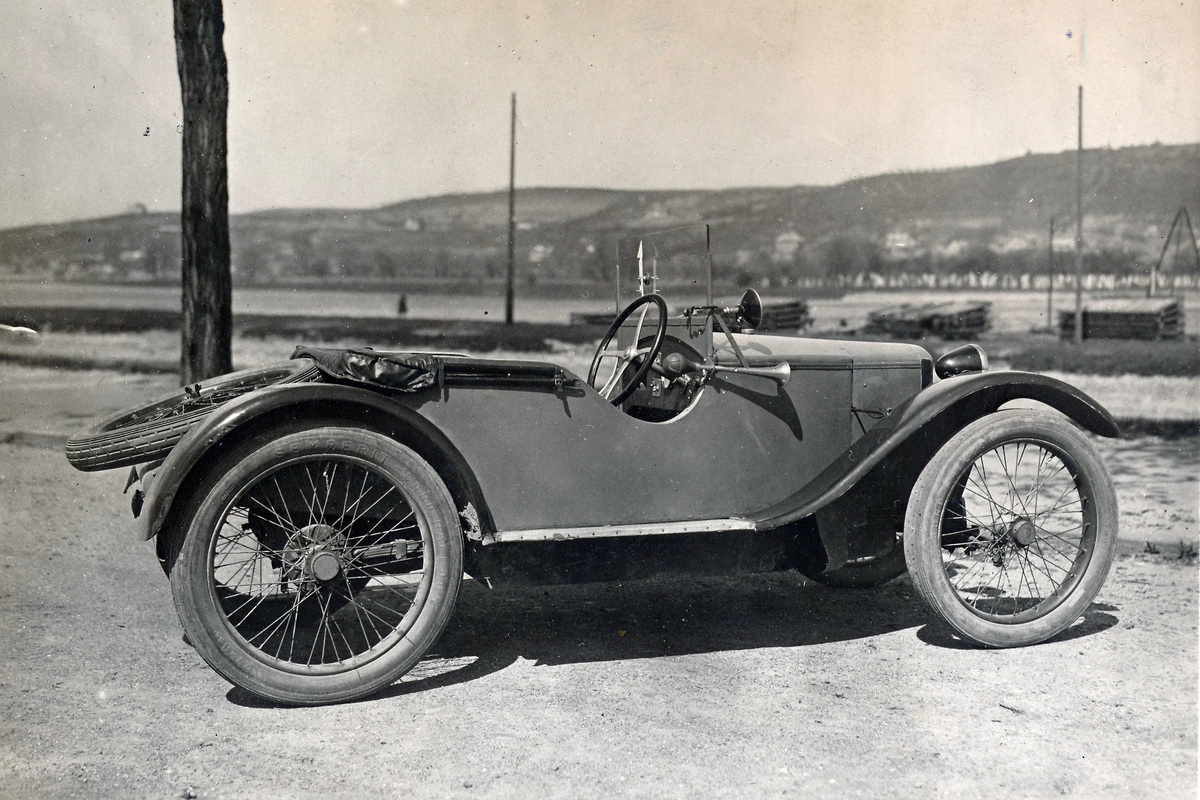
1927 Enka prototype without doors and with the 350cc engine

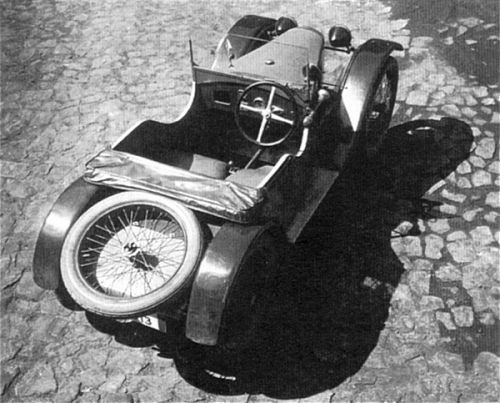
1927 Enka prototype rear view

=== Production ===
The production version had a wheelbase of 2,150 mm, length of 3,100 mm, a width of 1,150 mm (track width 1,000 mm) and a height of 1,400 mm. It was powered by a 500cc water-cooled single-cylinder engine with 85mm bore and 88mm stroke and an output of 10 hp (7 kW; 10 PS). The engine had removable aluminium cylinder head and the pistons were also made of aluminium. It had a top speed of 60 km/h (37 mph) and fuel consumption of 6 litres per 100 km. It had brakes in the rear axle, centerlock wheels and fabric roof. It only had one door on the left despite the steering wheel being on the right as well as a mother-in-law seat in the back. Standard features included an electric starter, headlights from Bosch and speedometer with clock. Options included shock absorbers, an electric horn and door lock. Customers could also request the car to have a hardtop with side windows, a pickup or van with closed loading bed. One example was built with Weymann coachwork. Price for a hardtop three-seater was 23,000 Kčs.

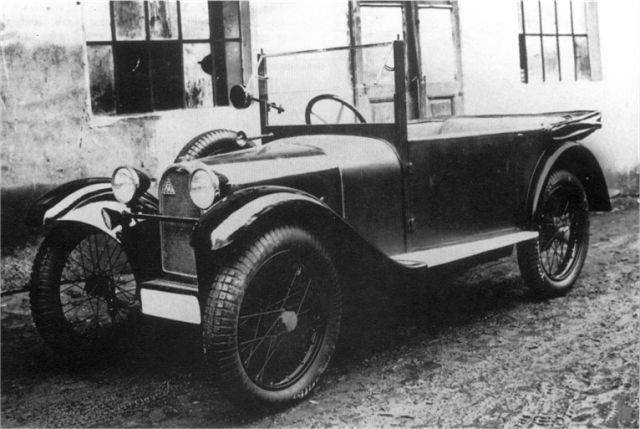
Enka Cabriolet front view

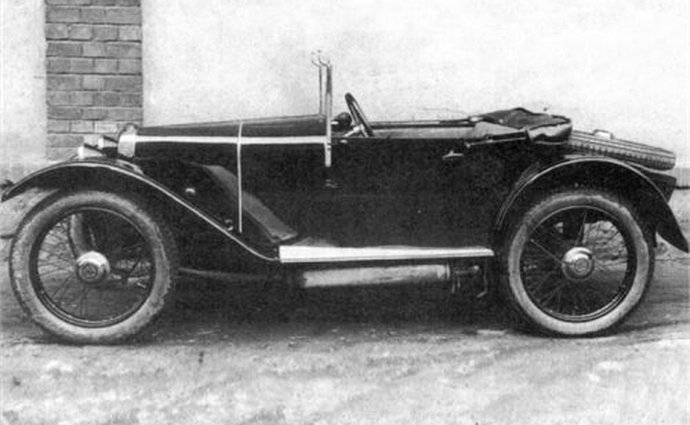
Enka Roadster side view

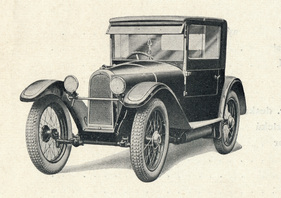
Enka hardtop with side windows

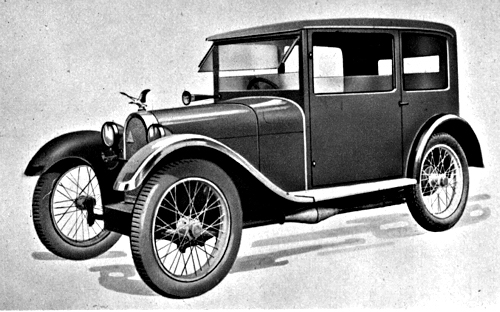
Enka with Weymann coachwork

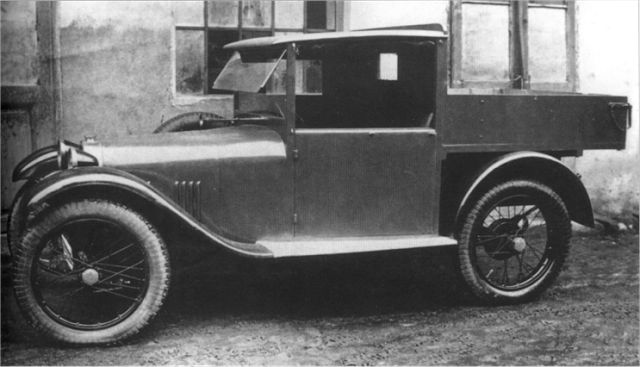
Enka pickup

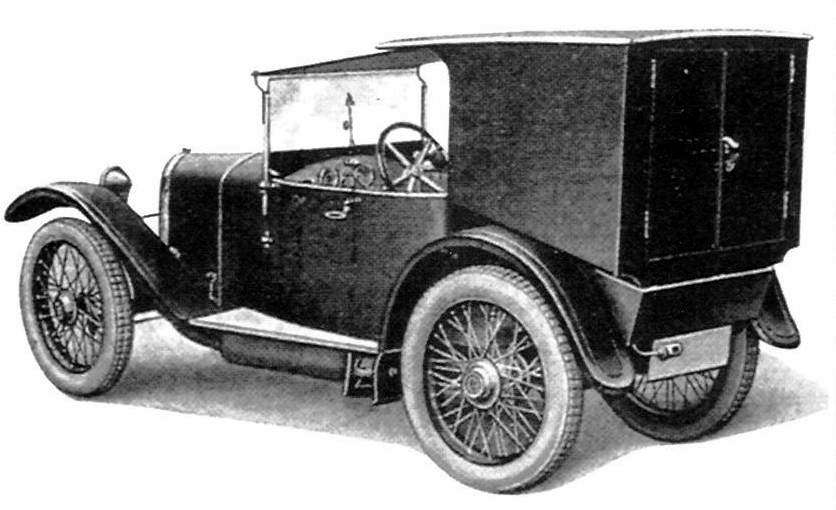
Enka van with closed loading bed

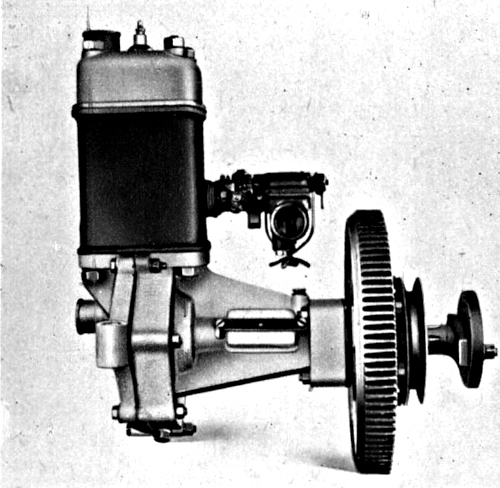
Enka engine

== Literature ==
- Harald H. Linz, Halwart Schrader: Die Internationale Automobil-Enzyklopädie. United Soft Media Verlag, Munich 2008, ISBN 978-3-8032-9876-8. (German)
- George Nicholas Georgano (Editor-in-chief.): The Beaulieu Encyclopedia of the Automobile. Band 1: A–F. Fitzroy Dearborn Publishers, Chicago 2001, ISBN 1-57958-293-1. (English).
