= Litostroj Power =

Slovenian heavy machinery manufacturer

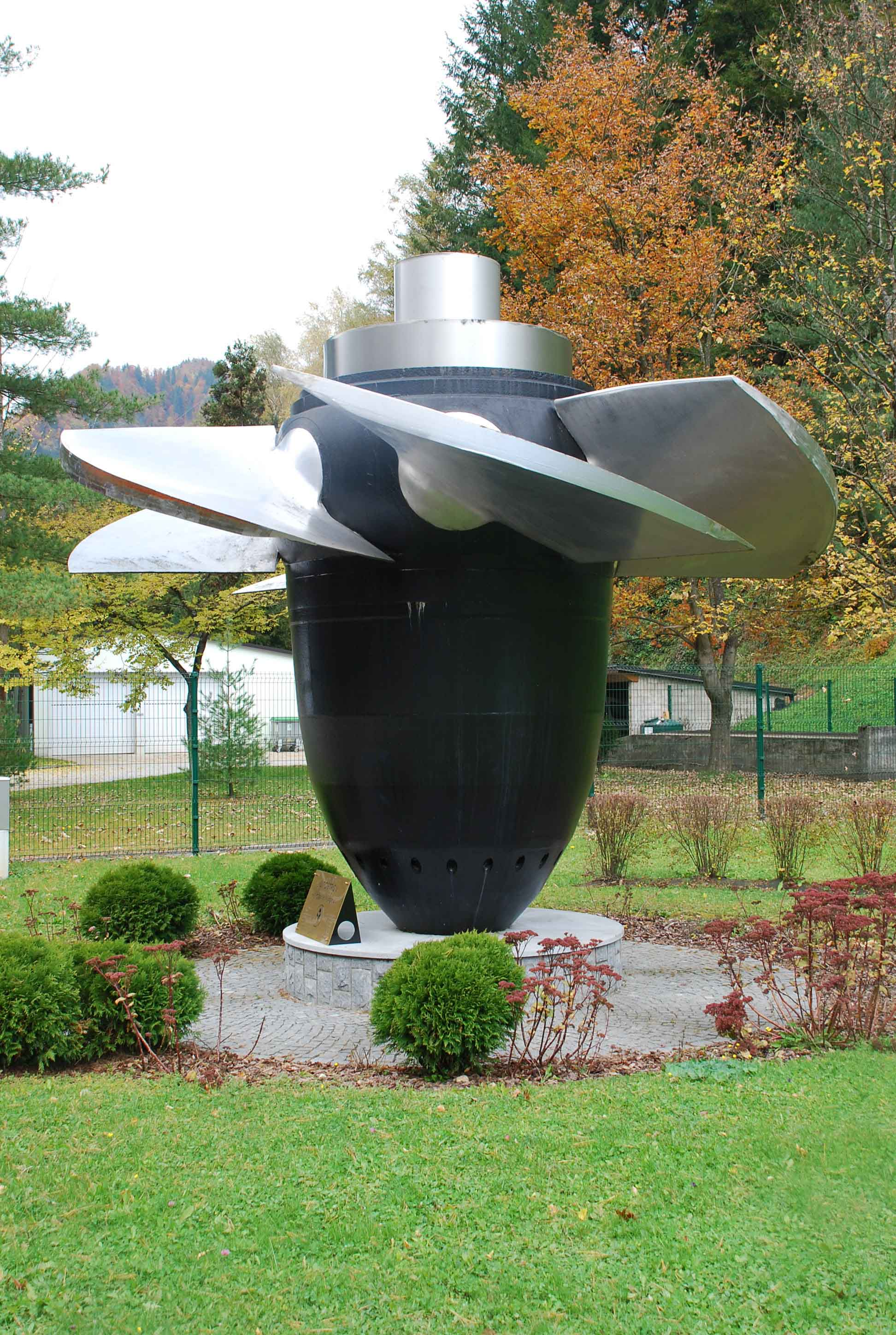
- Litostroj Kaplan Turbine
- Type: Private
- Industry: Heavy machinery
- Predecessor: Litostroj
- Founded: 1946
- Headquarters: Ljubljana, Slovenia
- Services: Machinery
- Revenue: $37.3M
- Parent: Wikov Group
- Website: https://www.litostrojpower.com/

Litostroj Power is a Slovenian heavy machinery manufacturer based in Ljubljana. Its products include mainly water turbines for hydroelectric powerplants. The company supplies its products to projects in Europe, North America, and other international markets. It provided around 8000 MW of installed power worldwide. Around 150 of them are pumped storage. It has also designed around 1200 large cranes. They also manufacture forging and pressing machines.

It is part of the Czech engineering group Wikov Group.

== History ==
The structure for the plant was built using forced labor by political prisoners from camps set up immediately after the Second World War.

Its name is derived from Livarna in tovarna strojev, meaning "Foundry and Machine Factory" in Slovene. Litostroj Street (Litostrojska cesta) in Ljubljana is named after the company.

Following the dissolution of the original Litostroj company in the early 1990s, the hydroelectric equipment division continued operating as Litostroj E.I. In 2003, the company joined the Cimos Group and renamed to Litostroj Power.

The company later acquired Czech hydroengineering firm ČKD Blansko Engineering and invested in hydraulic research laboratories in Blansko.
