= Economy of Slovenia =

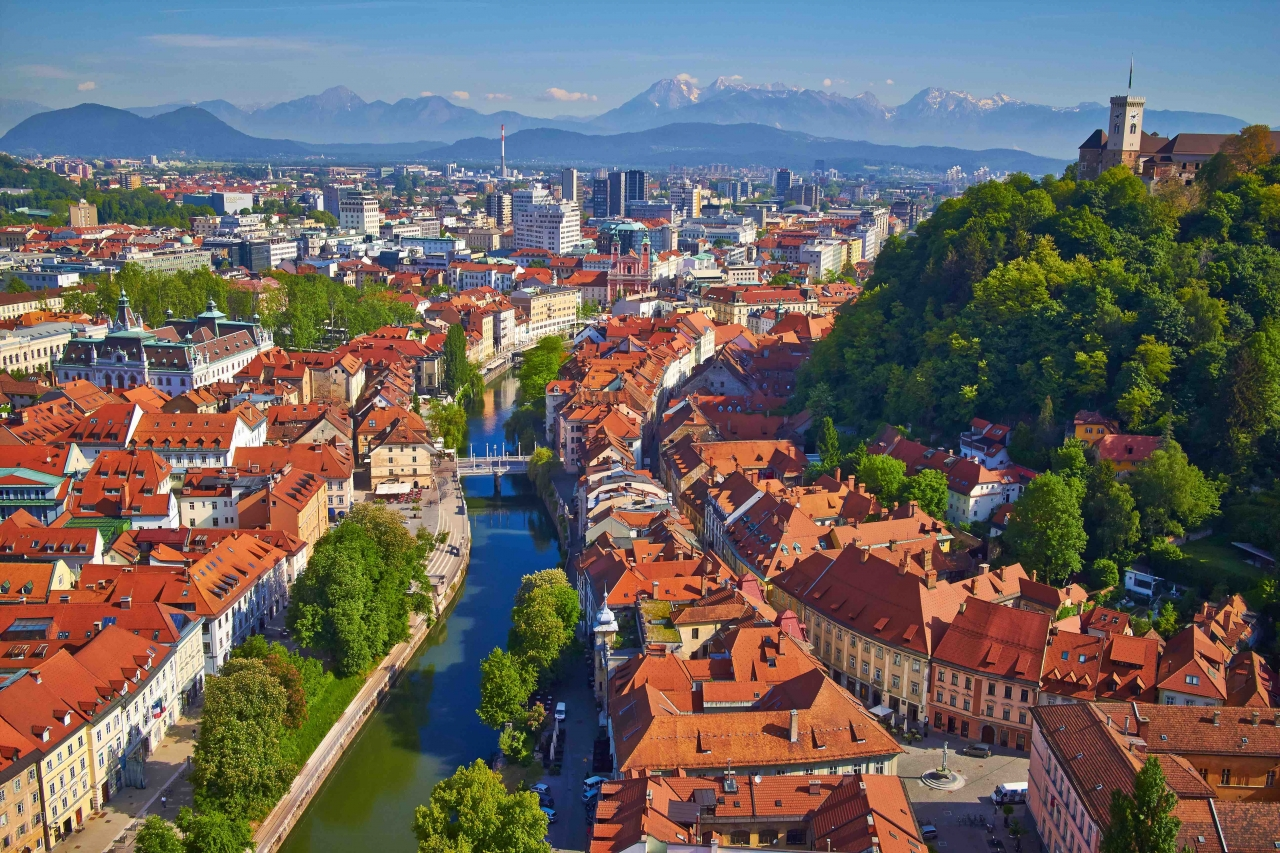
- The city of Ljubljana is the capital and financial centre of Slovenia.
- Currency: Euro (EUR, €)
- Fiscal year: Calendar year
- Trade organisations: EU, EEA, WTO, OECD
- Country group: Advanced economy; High-income economy

Statistics
- Population: ▲2,120,547 (2024)
- GDP: ▲$72 billion (nominal, 2024); ▲$113 billion (PPP, 2024)
- GDP rank: 87th (nominal, 2023); 94th (PPP, 2023)
- GDP growth: 2.6% (2025)
- GDP per capita: ▲$36,500 (nominal, 2025); ▲$58,150 (PPP, 2025)
- GDP per capita rank: 34th (nominal, 2025); 35th (PPP, 2025)
- GDP per capita growth: 0.9% (2025)
- GDP by sector: agriculture: 1.8%; industry: 32.2%; services: 65.9%; (2017 est.)
- Inflation (CPI): 7.4% (2023); 2.7% (2024); 2.0% (2025)
- Population below national poverty line: ▼12.7% at risk of poverty (2025); ▲13.7% at risk of poverty or social exclusion (AROPE 2023)
- Gini coefficient: ▲23.4 low (2023)
- Human Development Index: ▲0.926 very high (2022) (22nd); ▲0.882 very high IHDI (8th) (2022)
- Corruption Perceptions Index: ▲60 out of 100 points (2024, 36th rank)
- Labour force: ▲1,083,800 (2022); ▼77.5% employment rate (2023)
- Labour force by occupation: agriculture: 5.5%; industry: 31.2%; services: 63.3%; (2017 est.)
- Unemployment: ▼4.5% (November 2021); 11.2% youth unemployment (15 to 24 year-olds; June 2020)
- Average gross salary: €2,803 / $2,922 monthly (December 2024)
- Average net salary: €1,825 / $1,902 monthly (December 2024)
- Main industries: ferrous metallurgy and aluminum products, lead and zinc smelting; electronics (including military electronics), trucks, automobiles, electric power equipment, wood products, textiles, chemicals, pharmaceuticals, machine tools

External
- Exports: ▲$80.76 billion (2025)
- Export goods: manufactured goods, machinery and transport equipment, chemicals, food
- Main export partners: Switzerland 42.24%; Germany 10.19%; Croatia 6.77%; Italy 6.33%; Austria 3.95%; France 2.49%; Poland 2.18%; Hungary 1.86%; Serbia 1.77%; Russia 1.76%; (2025)
- Imports: ▲$79.50 billion (2025)
- Import goods: machinery and transport equipment, manufactured goods, chemicals, fuels and lubricants, food
- Main import partners: Switzerland 23.13%; China 12.71%; Germany 10.17%; India 7.82%; Italy 7.69%; Austria 6.24%; Croatia 4.59%; Hungary 3.03%; Netherlands 2.85%; Poland 2.25%; (2025)
- FDI stock: ▲$19.23 billion (31 December 2017 est.); ▲ Abroad: $9.914 billion (31 December 2017 est.)
- Current account: ▲$3.475 billion (2017 est.)
- Gross external debt: ▼$46.3 billion (31 January 2017 est.)

Public finance
- Government debt: ▼74.7% of GDP (2022); ▼€38.857 billion (2022)
- Foreign reserves: ▲$889.9 million (31 December 2017 est.)
- Budget balance: €260 million surplus (2019); +0.5% of GDP (2019)
- Revenue: 44.2% of GDP (2019)
- Spending: 43.7% of GDP (2019)
- Economic aid: €4.2 billion from European Structural and Investment Funds (2007–2013); €3.87 billion from European Structural and Investment Funds (2014–2020)
- Credit rating: Standard & Poor's: AA (Long Term); A-1+ (Short Term); AAA (T&C Assessment); Outlook: Stable (2026); Moody's: A2; Outlook: Stable (2026); Fitch: A+; Outlook: Stable (2025); Scope Ratings: A+; Outlook: Stable (2025)
- All values, unless otherwise stated, are in US dollars.

Slovenia has a developed and mixed economy. The country maintains a high quality of life and economic stability as well as above-average GDP-per-capita by purchasing power parity (PPP) at 91% of the EU average in 2023. The highest GDP-per-capita is in central Slovenia, around the capital city, Ljubljana. It is part of the Western Slovenia statistical region, which has a higher GDP-per-capita than eastern Slovenia.

In 2004, Slovenia became the first former Yugoslav republic to join the European Union. In 2007, Slovenia adopted the euro currency, thus joining the Eurozone. It has also been a member of the Organisation for Economic Co-operation and Development since 2010. Slovenia has a highly educated workforce, well-developed infrastructure, and is situated at a major transport crossroads. Almost two-thirds of the working population is employed in services. The level of foreign direct investment (FDI) is one of the lowest in Europe but has seen steady gains since the mid-2010s. The Slovenian economy was heavily impacted by the Euro area crisis. By 2013, GDP-per-capita began rising again.

== History ==
Slovenia comprised approximately one-eleventh of Yugoslavia's total population, it was the most productive of the Yugoslav republics, accounting for one-fifth of its GDP and one-third of its exports. It thus gained independence in 1991 with an already relatively prosperous economy and strong market ties to the West. Slovenia has been the wealthiest country of former Yugoslavia since 1992, with the highest GDP-per-capita following the Yugoslav dissolution.

Since that time it has vigorously pursued diversification of its trade with the West and integration into Western and transatlantic institutions. Slovenia is a founding member of the World Trade Organization, joined CEFTA in 1996, and joined the European Union on 1 May 2004. In June 2004 it joined the European Exchange Rate Mechanism. The euro was introduced at the beginning of 2007 and circulated alongside the tolar until 14 January 2007. Slovenia also participates in SECI (Southeast European Cooperation Initiative), as well as in the Central European Initiative, the Royaumont Process, and the Black Sea Economic Council.

During the Great Recession, the Slovenian economy suffered a severe setback. In 2009 the Slovenian GDP-per-capita shrank by 7.9%. After a slow recovery from the 2009 recession, thanks to exports, the economy of Slovenia again slid into recession in the last quarter of 2011. This has been attributed to the fall in domestic consumption and the slowdown in the growth of exports. Slovenia mainly exports to countries of the eurozone. The reasons for the decrease in domestic consumption have been multiple: fiscal austerity, the freeze in budget expenditure in the final months of 2011, a failure in the efforts to implement economic reforms, inappropriate financing, and the decrease in exports. In addition, the construction industry was severely hit in 2010 and 2011. From 2014 onwards GDP of Slovenia is rising again. The main factors of GDP growth are export and in the year 2016 also domestic consumption, which started to revive after the economic crisis. The GDP growth in 2015 was 2.3%; in the first half of 2016 it was 2.5%, and in the 2nd quarter of 2016 it was 2.7%. This means that GDP growth accelerated in 2016.

During the EU accession negotiations, Slovenia insisted on numerous derogations, refusing to open up certain key sectors of the economy to full competition. The country is the only one in Central and Eastern Europe to have retained control of its banking sector. The country has also preserved an important public service built during the socialist period: Slovenia still has one of the best healthcare systems in the world, and education is free up to the postgraduate level.

== Economic performance ==
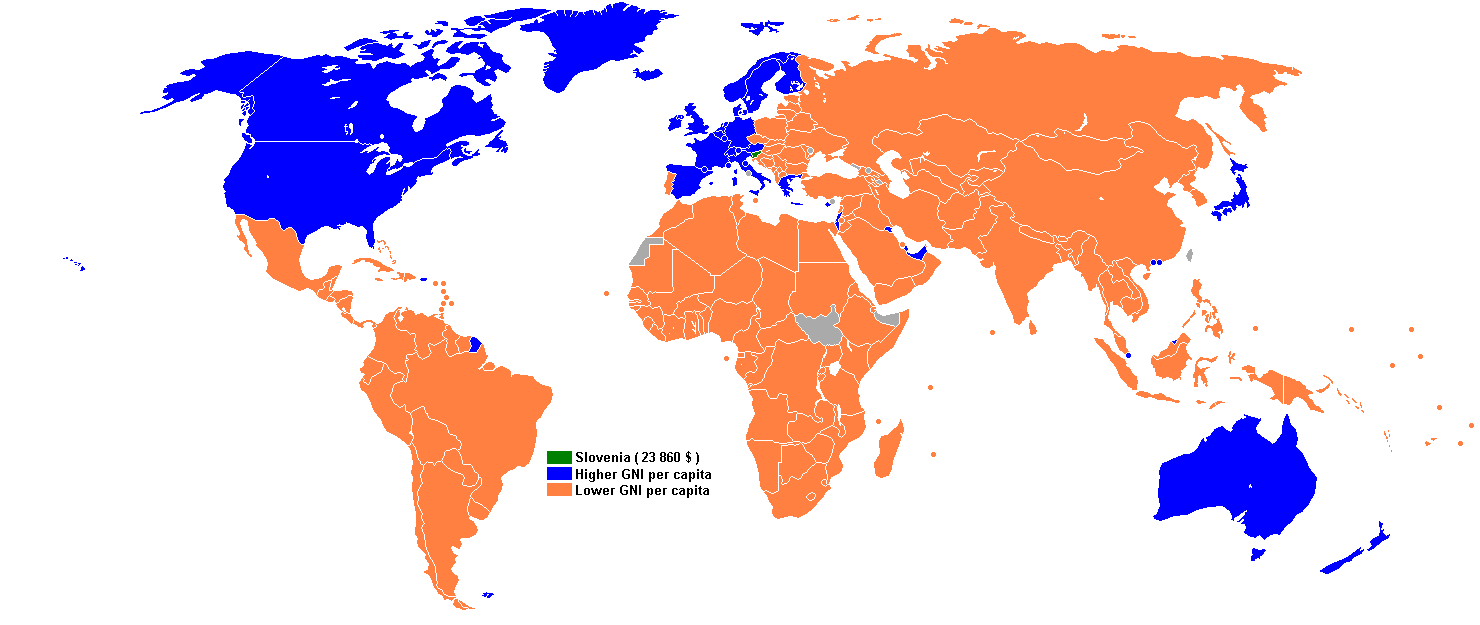
GNI per capita: Slovenia ($23,520) Higher GNI per capita compared to Slovenia Lower GNI per capita compared to Slovenia

The historical primary industries of agriculture, forestry, and fishing contribute a comparatively low 2.5 percent of GDP, and engage only 6 percent of the population. The average farm is only 5.5 hectares. Part of Slovenia lies in the Alpe-Adria bioregion, which is currently involved in a major initiative in organic farming. Between 1998 and 2003, the organic sector grew from less than 0.1% of Slovenian agriculture to roughly the European Union average of 3.3%.

Public finances have shown a deficit in recent years. This averaged around $650 million per annum between 1999 and 2007; however, this amounted to less than 23 percent of GDP. There was a slight surplus in 2008 with revenues totalling $23.16 billion and expenditures $22.93 billion. Government expenditure equalled 38 percent of GDP. As of January 2011, the total national debt of Slovenia was unknown. The Statistical Office of the Republic of Slovenia (SURS) reported it to be (not counting state-guaranteed loans) 19.5 billion euros or 54.2% of GDP at the end of September 2010. According to the data provided by the Slovenian Ministry of Finance in January 2011, it was just below 15 billion euros or 41.6% of the 2009 GDP. However, the Slovenian financial newspaper Finance calculated in January 2011 that it was actually 22.4 billion euros or almost 63% of GDP, surpassing the limit of 60% allowed by the European Union. On 12 January 2011, the Slovenian Court of Audit rejected the data reported by the ministry as incorrect and demanded the dismissal of the finance minister Franc Križanič.

Slovenia's traditional anti-inflation policy relied heavily on capital inflow restrictions. Its privatization process favoured insider purchasers and prescribed a long lag time on share trading, complicated by a cultural wariness of being "bought up" by foreigners. As such, Slovenia has had a number of impediments to foreign participation in its economy. Slovenia has garnered some notable foreign investments, including the investment of $125 million by Goodyear in 1997. At the end of 2008, there was around $11.5 billion of foreign capital in Slovenia. Slovenians had invested $7.5 billion abroad. As of 31 December 2007, the value of shares listed on the Ljubljana Stock Exchange was $29 billion.

Investments from neighboring Croatia have begun in Slovenia. On 1 July 2010, Droga Kolinska was purchased by the Atlantic Group of Croatia for 382 million euros. Mercator was sold to Croatia's Agrocor in June 2014.

At the end of the year 2014, there were 10 billion foreign direct investment in Slovenia, 13.9% more than at the end of the year 2013. In 2013 (latest published data) direct foreign investments accounted for 24.7% of the GDP of Slovenia. The most important investor countries are Austria (33.6%), Switzerland (11.3%), Germany (10.4%), Italy (7.9%), and Croatia (7.7%).

== Data ==
The following table shows the main economic indicators from 1993–2019.

Year	GDP (in bil. US$ PPP)	GDP (in bil. EUR PPP)	GDP-per-capita (in EUR PPP)	GDP (in bil. US$ nominal)	GDP growth (real)	Inflation (in Percent)	Unemployment rate	Government debt (in % of GDP)
1993	23.5	7.8	3,908	16.6	2.8 %	31.9 %	8.6 %	...
1995	26.9	10.6	8,311	21.4	4.1 %	13.7 %	7.0 %	18.2 %
2000	35.8	18.9	11,076	20.4	3.7 %	8.9 %	6.7 %	25.9 %
2005	47.8	29.1	14,551	36.3	3.8 %	2.5 %	6.5 %	26.4 %
2006	52.2	31.5	15,676	39.5	5.7 %	2.5 %	6.0 %	26.1 %
2007	57.3	35.1	17,373	48.1	7.0 %	3.7 %	4.9 %	22.8 %
2008	60.5	37.9	18,757	55.8	3.5 %	5.7 %	4.4 %	21.8 %
2009	56.2	36.3	17,758	50.5	−7.5 %	0.8 %	5.1 %	34.5 %
2010	57.7	36.4	17,749	48.2	1.3 %	1.8 %	5.4 %	38.3 %
2011	59.4	37.1	18,052	51.6	0.9 %	1.8 %	7.1 %	46.5 %
2012	59.7	36.3	17,626	46.6	−2.6 %	2.6 %	8.5 %	53.6 %
2013	61.7	36.5	17,700	48.4	−1.0 %	1.8 %	11.1 %	70 %
2014	63.7	37.6	18,253	50.0	2.8 %	0.2 %	10.8 %	80.3 %
2015	65.3	38.9	18,830	43.1	2.2 %	−0.5 %	9.8 %	82.6 %
2016	70.1	40.4	19,589	44.8	3.2 %	−0.1 %	8.9 %	78.5 %
2017	75.8	43.0	20,820	48.6	4.8 %	1.4 %	7.8 %	74.1 %
2018	81.1	45.9	22,136	54.2	4.4 %	1.7 %	5.9 %	70.3 %
2019	85.4	48.4	23,167	54.4	3.3 %	1.6 %	4.8 %	65.6 %

== Trade ==
Exports of Slovenia by product category (2019) Chemical products Transportation Machines Mineral products Plastics and rubbers Metals Foodstuffs Precious metals Textiles Instruments Animal products Vegetable products Paper goods Footwear and headwear Miscellaneous Stone and glass Wood products Animal and vegetable bi-products Animal hides Arts and antiques Weapons

Slovenia's trade is orientated towards other EU countries, mainly Germany and Italy. This is the result of a wholesale reorientation of trade toward the West and the growing markets of central and eastern Europe in the face of the collapse of its Yugoslav markets. Slovenia's economy is highly dependent on foreign trade. Trade equals about 120% of GDP (exports and imports combined). About two-thirds of Slovenia's trade is with other EU members.

This high level of openness makes it extremely sensitive to economic conditions in its main trading partners and changes in its international price competitiveness. However, despite the economic slowdown in Europe in 2001–03, Slovenia maintained a 3% GDP growth. Keeping labour costs in line with productivity is thus a key challenge for Slovenia's economic well-being, and Slovenian firms have responded by specializing in mid- to high-tech manufacturing. Industry and construction comprise about one-quarter of the GDP. As in most industrial economies, services make up an increasing share of output (57.1 percent), notably in financial services.

== Companies ==
In 2022, the sector with the highest number of companies registered in Slovenia is services with 60,260 companies followed by wholesale trade and construction with 9,980 and 9,010 companies respectively.

== Agriculture ==
The agricultural output of Slovenia in 2018:

- 350,000 metric tons (390,000 short tons) of maize;
- 126,000 metric tons (139,000 short tons) of grapes;
- 121,000 metric tons (133,000 short tons) of wheat;
- 88,000 metric tons (97,000 short tons) of barley;
- 86,000 metric tons (95,000 short tons) of apples;
- 72,000 metric tons (79,000 short tons) of potatoes,

in addition to smaller amounts of other agricultural products.

Neonicotinoids are commonly used as they are throughout the world, including the use of thiacloprid in the country's apple orchards. Smodiš Škerl et al (2009) found that thiacloprid/apple application practices leave a residue in the pollen but not in bee bread.

== See also ==
- List of banks in Slovenia
- List of companies of Slovenia
