= Kaipan =

Czech vehicle manufacturer

Kaipan s.r.o.

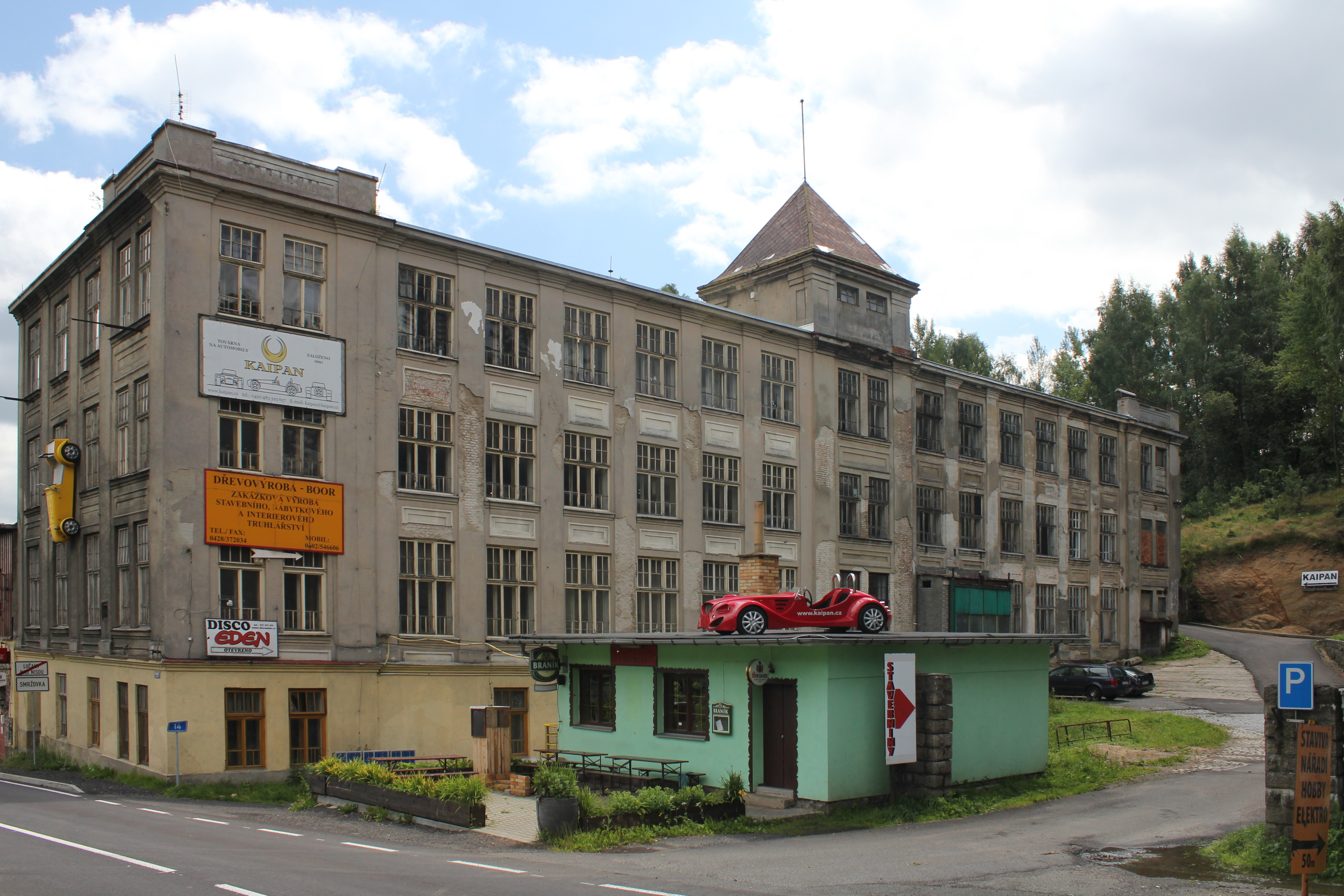
- Kaipan Headquarters and factory in Smržovka
- Industry: Automotive
- Founded: 1991
- Headquarters: Smržovka, Czech Republic
- Products: Roadsters
- Website: www.kaipan.cz

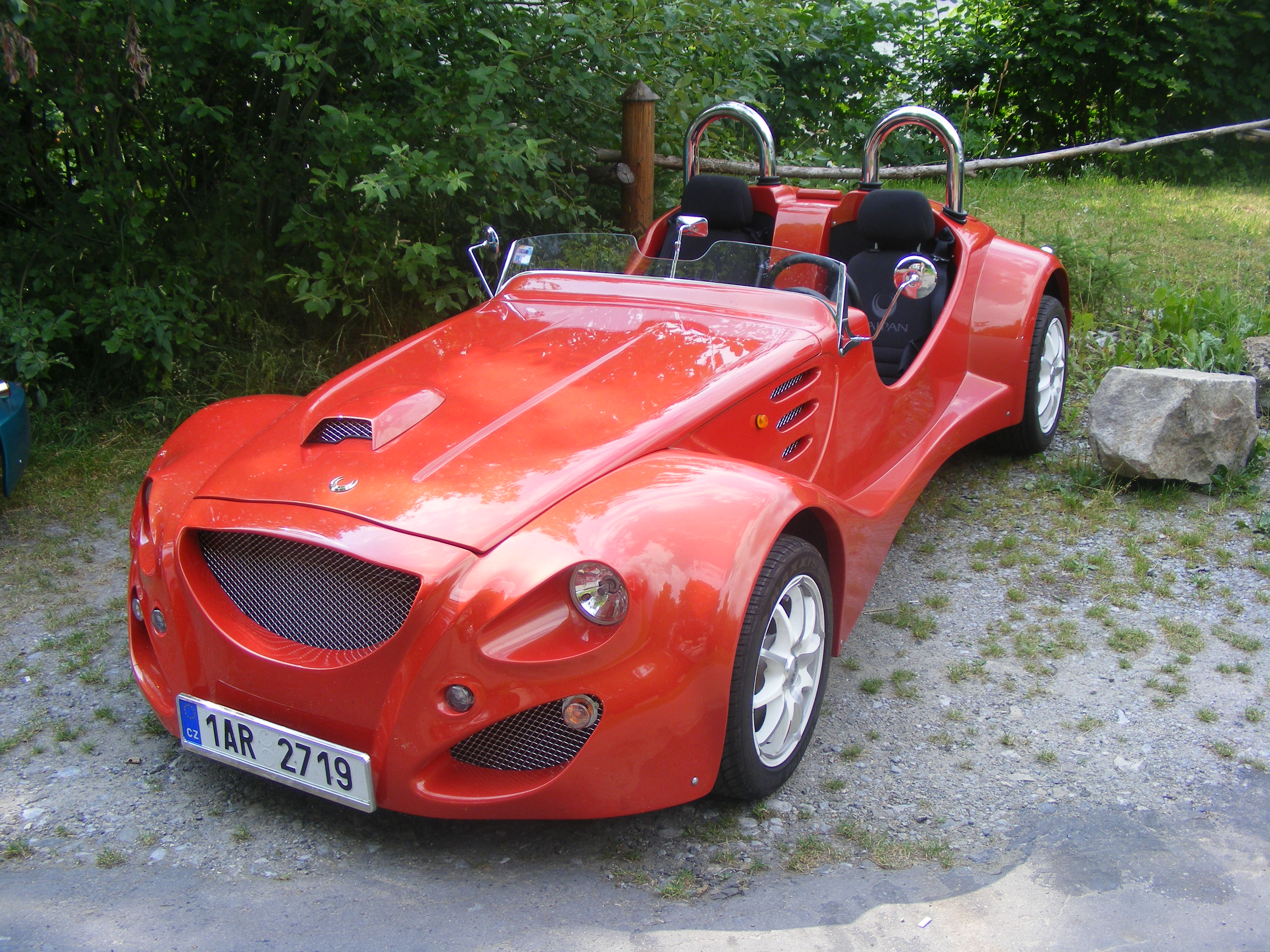
Kaipan 14

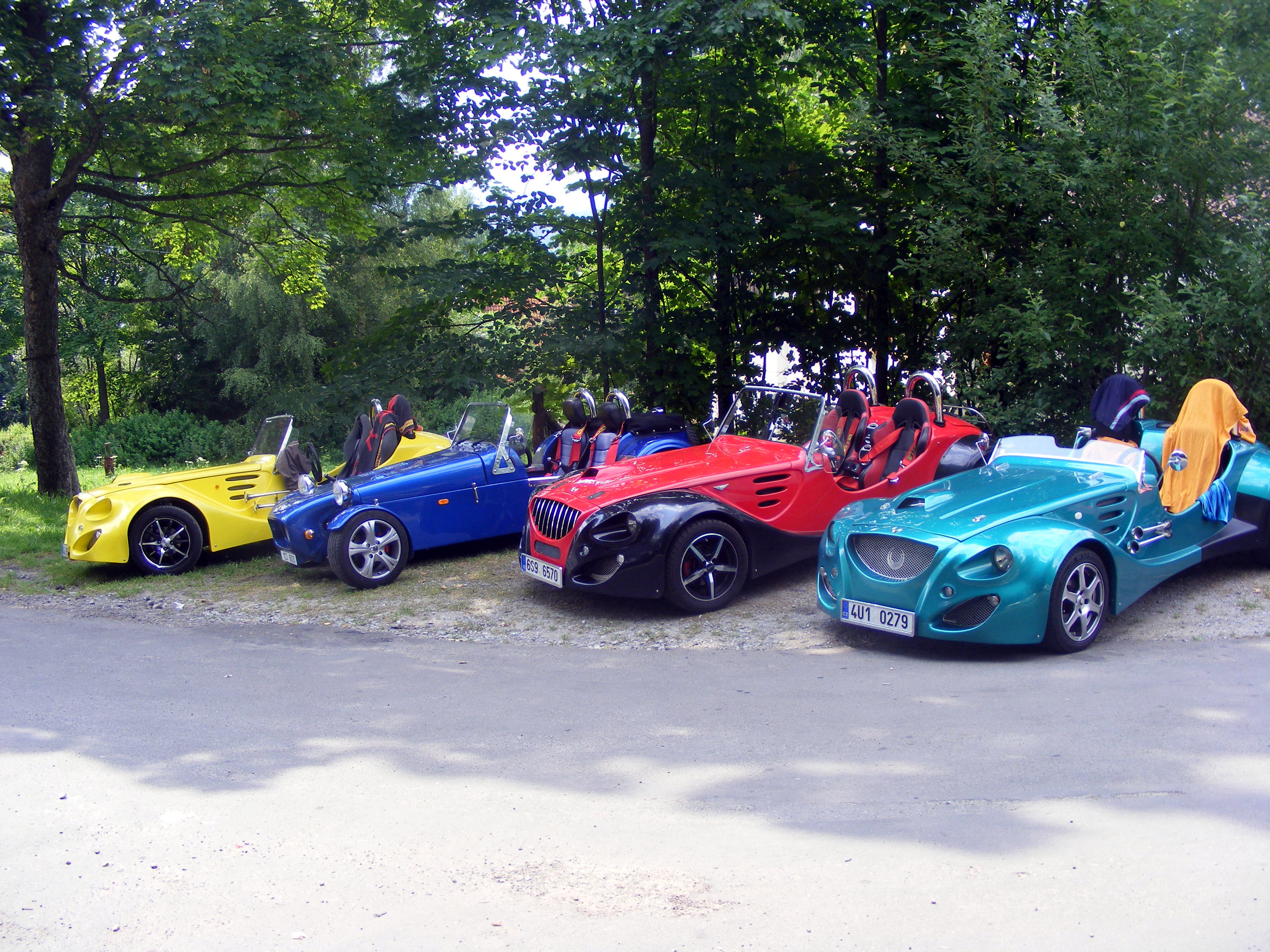
Kaipans

Kaipan is a small Czech vehicle manufacturer in Smržovka focused on producing roadsters.

== History ==
The company was founded in 1991, but the first car, Kaipan 47 based on Lotus Seven (1957–1972), has been manufactured since 1997. Later it was replaced by modified type 57 with Volkswagen engine 1.8 20V Turbo.

In 2006, Kaipan uncovered the first model with their original bodywork, Kaipan 14. They have engine from Škoda Favorit and the production process is provided as a rebuilding of the prime car. Kaipan 14 was also shipped to Germany, Netherlands, Serbia, Montenegro and Slovakia. In 2008, Kaipan 15 with newer Škoda engine was introduced. Until 2011, around 340 of these cars were made. Kaipan 14 kit (excluding parts from Favorit) cost 235,000 CZK, the price of already assembled version of Kaipan 15 was 499,000 CZK.

In the beginning of 2012, production of brand new type 16 has started. It has a new stronger Škoda engine, it fulfills Euro 5 emission standards and giving a top speed of 189 km/h. Today, the company produces models: 14, 16 and 57. In 2018, Kaipan 57a was introduced, among the major innovations is compliance with the Euro 6 emission standard.

== Models ==
Model	Engine	Max. power at rpm	Max. speed	0–100 km/h	Production
Kaipan 47	Ford 2.0	78 kW, 5500 ot./min.	178 km/h	6.5 s	1997–2001
Kaipan 57	VW 1.8	110 kW, 5700 ot./min.	180 km/h	5.9 s	2002–
Kaipan 14	Škoda 1.3	50 kW, 5500 ot./min.	140 km/h	8 s	2006–
Kaipan 15	Škoda 1.4	44 kW, 5000 ot./min.	150 km/h	?	2008–2011
Kaipan 16	Škoda 1.2	77 kW, 5000 ot./min.	189 km/h	6.9 s	2012–

== See also ==
- List of Czech automobiles
