= Novo (car) =

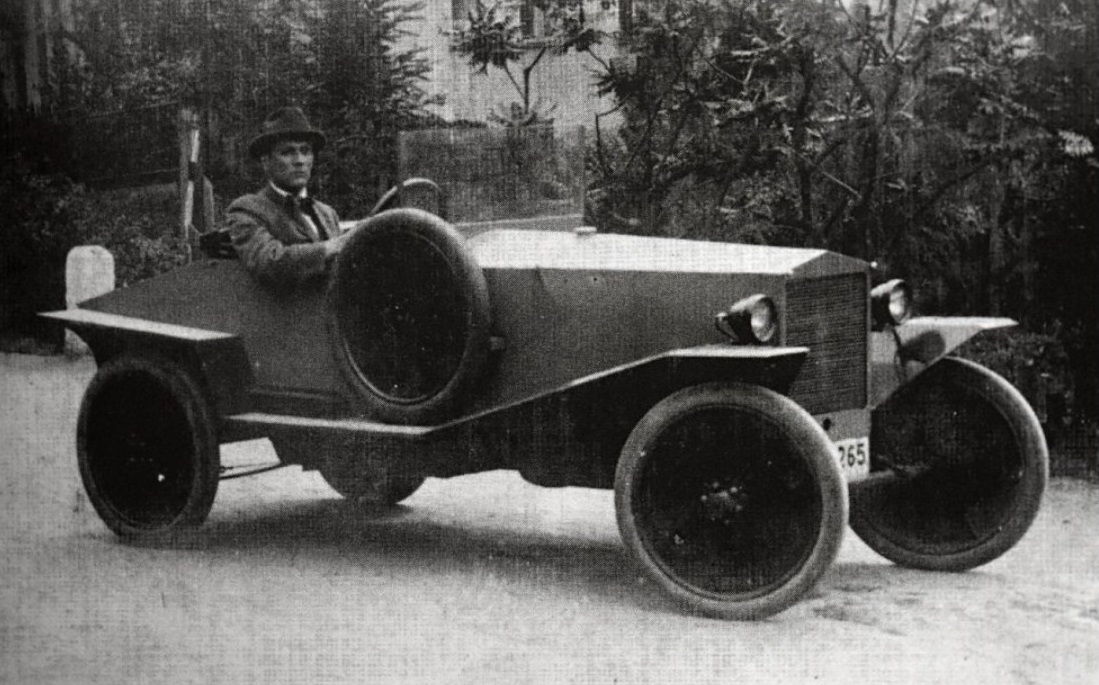

Overview
- Production: 1921–1922
- Designer: Břetislav Novotný

Body and chassis
- Class: Cyclecar
- Layout: FR layout

Dimensions
- Wheelbase: 2,300 mm (90.6 in)
- Length: 3,200 mm (126.0 in)
- Height: 1,400 mm (55.1 in)
- Curb weight: 400 kg (880 lb)

Chronology
- Successor: Omega

The Novo was a Czech automobile prototype designed by Břetislav Novotný.

Novotný started working his first prototype, the Novo in 1921 in a small workshop in Brno and later in a garage in Košíře. He presented the finished prototype to the public in July 1922.

The Novo had an open body with a wheelbase and track gauge (front and rear wheels) of 2300 mm, a length of 3200 mm and a height of 1400 mm, equipped with a canvas roof. Both front and rear wheels were rigid axles with quarter-elliptical leaf spring suspensions. Drum brakes were only used on the rear wheels. It was powered by an air-cooled 770cc two-stroke inline two-cylinder Baer engine with an output of 12 hp (9 kW; 12 PS) and a top speed of 70 km/h (43 mph), the engine was mounted behind the front axles with a chain drive powering the rear axles. Mated with a friction transmission which also worked as the clutch with an aluminium disc with a rubber lining fitted to the flywheel. It had 5 forward speeds and 1 reverse speed.

The first prototype had a simple square shape design with folded fenders. The steering wheel was on the left hand side and the door on the right hand side (at the time, vehicles in Czechoslovakia were driven on the left side of the road). The headlights were built into the wall of the windscreen frame. The second prototype had more refined front fenders and the front headlights were moved to the side of the bonnet. The steering wheel was also moved to the right hand side and the door on left hand side. A spare wheel was added to the right side of the body as well as a flip-up emergency seat in the rear accommodated for one adult or two children.

Novotný told journalist in July 1922 about it reliability thanks to the friction gearbox and claimed to have drove it successfully around the Giant Mountains but had no intention of putting it into production. The Czech and German press in Prague reported that Novotný was negotiating sale licenses with foreign buyers but this was most likely a publicity stunt to attract potential investors.

== Gallery ==
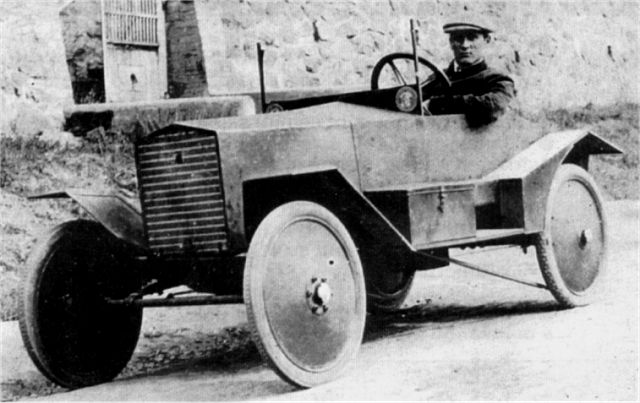
Early prototype with left hand drive and headlights built into the wall of the windscreen frame

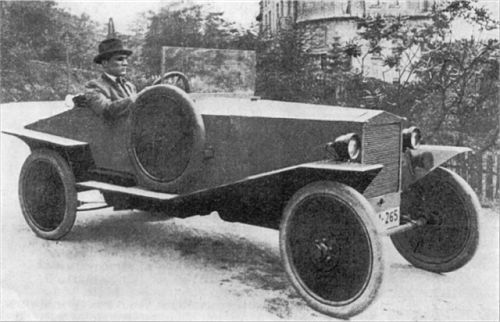
Final prototype with right hand drive and traditional front headlights

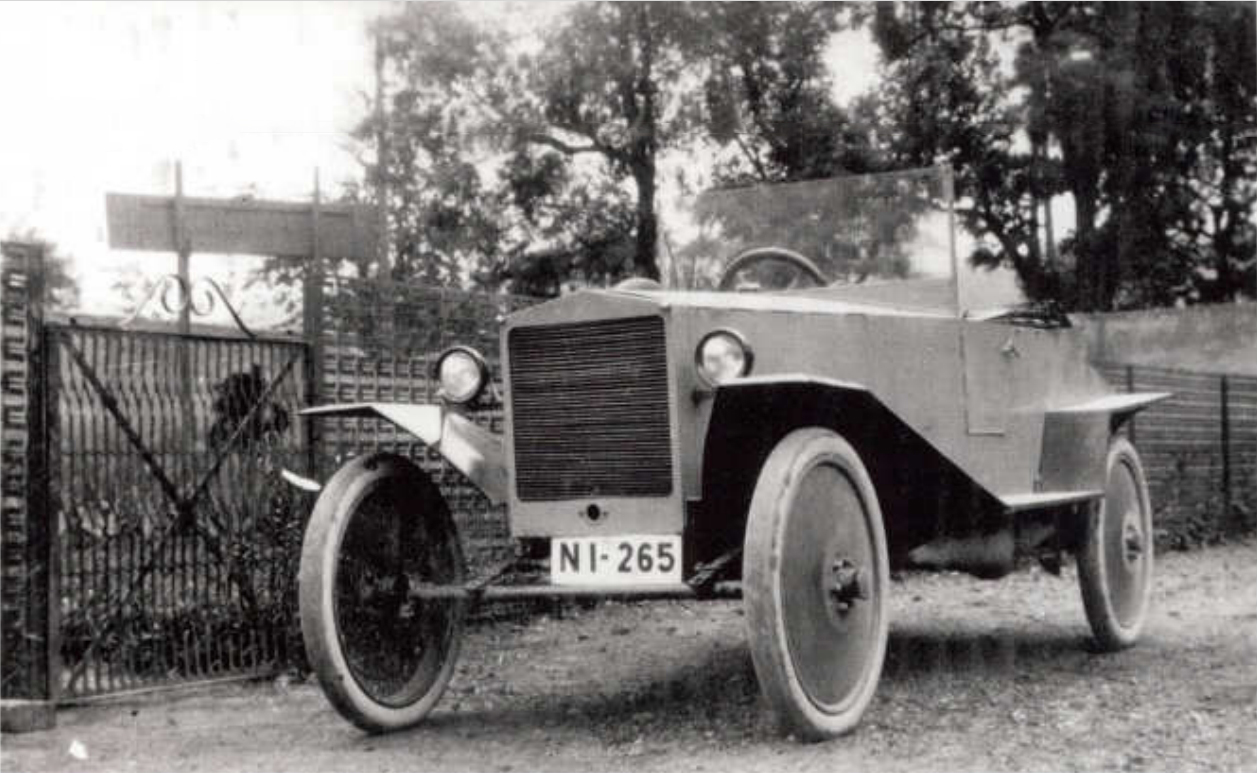
Final prototype with right hand drive and traditional front headlights.

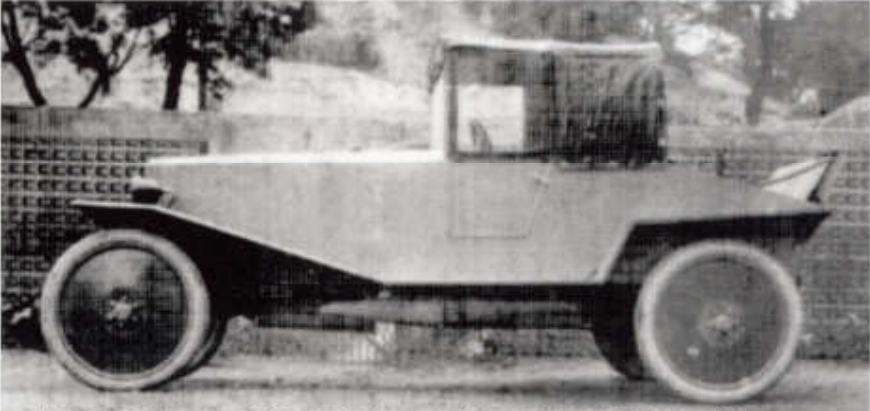
Final prototype with canvas roof up

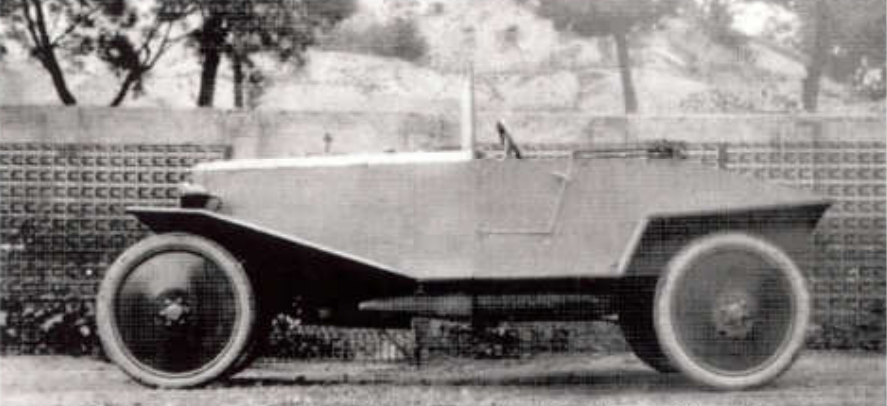
Final prototype with canvas roof removed
