= MW Motors Luka EV =

Luka EV

Overview
- Manufacturer: MW Motors
- Assembly: Czech Republic

Body and chassis
- Class: Electric car
- Body style: 2-door, 2-seat coupe
- Layout: Four-wheel drive, wheel hub motors

Powertrain
- Electric motor: 4x12.5 kW (17 hp)
- Transmission: Single gear
- Battery: 21.9 kWh Ternary/(NiCoMn)O2
- Electric range: 300 km (190 miles)

Dimensions
- Wheelbase: 2,300 mm (91 in)
- Length: 4,050 mm (159 in)
- Width: 1,620 mm (64 in)
- Height: 1,220 mm (48 in)
- Curb weight: 749 kg (1,651 lb)

The MW Motors Luka EV is an electric car designed and produced by MW Motors in the Czech Republic since the 2010s.

The Luka EV is unusual in having four wheel hub motors instead of a central electric motor. The body is inspired by the JK 2500 prototype and is made from fibreglass on an aluminium chassis.

Charging the battery takes 9 hours from a domestic single phase 220 VAC socket or 2 hours with a 3-phase rapid charger.

The MRK I and II prototypes were hand built as open source projects on Hackaday. The final production MRK III follows the previous cars closely but the details are closed source. The price is expected to start at €30,000.

The MRK I prototype was nominated, together with five other vehicles, for the eCarTec Award 2015 in the Electric Vehicle category.
