= GeaBios =

- Flexible user interface - more concurrent rich Internet applications
- Website type: Web mapping and astronomy
- Available in: English and Slovenian
- Owner: Academa
- Creator: Academa
- Website: www.geabios.com
- Commercial: No
- Registration: Not required
- Launched: May 1999
- Current status: Active

GeaBios is a free (non-profit) "Slovene Citizen Oriented Information Service", and the name stands for Geo Enabled And Better Internet Oriented Services.

People backing up the service come from a variety of businesses, institutions and different countries, but mostly from Slovenia. All the information are somehow connected to the Earth and Space (geocoded). The Internet applications, which are running mostly on client side, enable the viewing of maps, aerial photography and satellite imagery. They reveal the Earth from above and the Space from below. Many specific layers of different content can be pasted over those maps and images. Time dependent information is calculated on-line.

Motto: GeaBios is a process not a fixed solution.

== Development ==
In 1999 the first application named Aviator 2000 2D/3D map over Internet came out. It was created in JavaScript (DHTML) with additional ActiveX/OpenGL plug-in. The application had little uptake, as Netscape Communicator, which did not support ActiveX, had a large market share at that time. Users complained because they were not able to use the 3D modules. To avoid that, developers created 2D Java 1.1 based interface and soon removed ActiveX application. For Internet Explorer users with Microsoft's JRE 1.1 the applications are still written in Java 1.1. Due to well known problems of Gecko's Java Live Connect the applications are being gradually transferred to Flash.

== Contents ==
The basic principle in the design of the service is to "Keep it as simple as possible, but not more than that". Through offering a wide range of general interest data and useful services free of charge, the service is attractive for users in spite the fact that it is not always simple to use. GeaBios offers a variety of information and services, adding new ones constantly. Some of them are:

- Maps of Slovenia, Information about Slovenia (Slovenia in Brief), search for: addresses and other categories.
- On-line information about the Space, the Sky and the Earth, Solar System simulator
- Easy GPS navigation and Tracking Online
- Access to online weather forecasts including satellite and radar pictures
- Tide tables for Mediterranean
- Satellite imagery and maps with search for more than 8.000.000 geographic entities worldwide
- Atomic clock synchronization
- Tools such as a Unit Converter, English Dictionary OnLine, ...

== Features ==
Trenta valley

Information is provided in a wide range of displays, which include text, images, photographs, maps all of them inter related, and a lot of them time dependent. It is possible to locate information either from a graphical image (e.g. map) or from text. Applications are inter-connected and influence each other, for example, pre-defined flight over Julian Alps can drive a two-dimensional map (if available) to show the position and view angle. The same technique is used for GPS navigation. Most importantly, the applications act as components, they can work alone or together.

== Data used ==
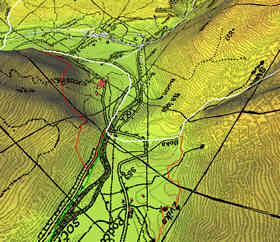
Terrain generator (Soča)

The information service contains data of two main types:

- Raster maps, starting from scale 1:5,000 to the scale 1:2,500,000. Software enables smooth zooming and panning through all scales.
- Geocoded data are represented by entities, which act as points, lines, polylines or areas. 2D and 3D. All information contained in the information service is geocoded. e.g. displayed on map.

Maps and geocoded data were obtained legally from the following companies and institutions:

- Ministry of Environment – Surveying and Mapping Authority of the Republic of Slovenia
- Geodetic Institute of Republic of Slovenia
- SAZU – Slovenian Academy of Sciences and Arts
- Geological Institute of Republic of Slovenia
- Statistical Office of the Republic of Slovenia
- Jet Propulsion Laboratory
- Academa Ltd

== Technology used ==
The web page is created as RIA. The content is loaded in the background, JavaScript methods are changing the DOM of the main page, which acts like a layout manager with so called floating windows. Different applications run concurrently in the environment of the web page and communicate among each other. The applications are built as pure JavaScript, Java applets and flash applets.

== Milestones ==
- May 1999, Aviator 2D/3D interactive maps (DHTML interface and ActiveX/OpenGL plug-in)
- August 2000, 2D maps Java based interface, search for Slovenian addresses, restaurants, ...
- May 2001, astronomy, Aviator 2D/3D was removed (reason: support of MS IE only – criticism of Netscape users)
- February 2002, Information kiosk system support
- May 2003, weather viewer modules added
- July 2004, new design, more applications are running simultaneously
- June 2005, satellite imagery, maps and search for geographic entities worldwide added
- September 2006, GeoRSS feed added
- June 2007, Experimental video geo-search

== Funding ==
A private company Academa Ltd is funding the GeaBios project entirely from its own sources.
