= Academa =

Slovenian software development company

Coordinates: 46°2′18″N 14°28′4″E

ACADEMA
- Type: Private limited company
- Industry: Software development, Internet
- Founded: Ljubljana (1992)
- Headquarters: Ljubljana, Slovenia
- Website: www.academa.si

ACADEMA is a privately held Slovenian engineering software development company, founded in 1992 and based in Ljubljana. The company is oriented to custom made solutions fitted to special purpose, based on: Modeling of Processes, Numerical Analysis, Optimization Methods, Geometric modeling, Topology, Artificial intelligence and Formal logic.

The name of the company is an acronym for Advanced Computer Aided Design Engineering Manufacturing Agency.

== History ==
In the early 1990s, the company developed software for Civil Engineering, Mechanic of Structures, Computational Fluid Dynamics and CNC Machining, but later on, in the mid 1990s, moved to Geographic Information Systems and Geostatistics also. In the late 1990s, web services were developed, based on DHTML, ActiveX and Java. The transition to Internet-based systems affected the customer acquisition especially in the sphere of public utilities, particularly in reducing costs on client-side.

== Engineering backgrounds ==
The above engineering systems are conditioned with the necessary basic knowledge in various fields, therefore the need for interdisciplinary is obvious.

Software engineering backgrounds are based on:

- Modeling of Processes,
- Numerical Analysis, specially Finite element method
- Optimization Methods – Vehicle routing, Job shop scheduling, Timetable,
- Geometric modeling – Geographic information systems and Geostatistics,
- Topology,
- Artificial intelligence,
- Formal logic.

== Technical backgrounds ==
Technical backgrounds are based on:

- Civil engineering,
- Mechanics of Structures,
- NC Machining,
- Storage, Fabrication and Transportation of Materials and Products.

== Products ==
=== CAE product ===
- PCBCAD, statical analysis of prestressed concrete bridges

Most Slovenian viaducts between 1993 and 2004 were calculated with the program. The engineers in the Slovenija ceste Tehnika and the Gradis, two of the largest construction companies in Slovenia, used programme for statical analyses of the prestressed bridge constructions.

=== Application server ===
- ACADEMA Application Server, Java EE Server + Model-driven architecture + Formal logic, with more than 200 modules, for Unix (Linux) or Microsoft Windows Platform (GeaBios GIS Public Service is running on that platform)

=== GIS product ===
- AVIATOR, tools and components to develop complex GIS applications

DHTML and ActiveX/OpenGL web application (The look as it was in the year 1999)

=== Production systems ===
- Weather forecasting production system, based on ACADEMA Application Server
- AMEBA – Slovenian archive of the meteorological data
- GV System, Real estate appraisal modeling system (Computer Assisted Mass Appraisal)
- Automated Valuation Modeling, specially developed for handling mortgage loan portfolio (for banks), includes:
  - Information on a subject property and recent sales history.
  - Comparable sales analysis of like properties.
  - An indicative market value for many residential properties nationwide (Slovenia).
  - Price index of subject property based on Sale Price Appraisal Ratio (SPAR).
- ClueBoomBus CmWell, Distributed Data Warehouse/Data Marts of Streamed Linked Data as Knowledge BaseSystem

=== Free web information service ===
- GeaBios – "Slovene Citizen Oriented Information Service".
