= Wikov Group =

Czech industrial engineering group

Wikov Group a.s.
- Formerly: Wikov Industry a.s.
- Type: Private
- Industry: Mechanical engineering
- Founded: 21 July 2004; 22 years ago
- Headquarters: Prague, Czech Republic
- Key people: Martin Wichterle (chairman)
- Products: Industrial gearboxes and gears; Rail vehicle drive systems; Water turbines; Hydropower equipment
- Revenue: CZK 6.644 billion (2025)
- Net income: CZK 281 million (2025)
- Owner: Martin Wichterle
- Number of employees: 1,405 (2025 average)
- Website: www.wikovgroup.com

Wikov Group a.s. is a Czech industrial engineering group headquartered in Prague. It manufactures industrial and rail gearboxes and drive systems, as well as turbines and other equipment for hydropower plants. Its businesses are organised into two main divisions: Gear, operating mainly under the Wikov and Gmeinder brands, and Hydro, operating under the Litostroj brand.

Martin Wichterle began building the modern Wikov business in the early 2000s by acquiring several engineering companies. He then revived the Wikov name, previously used by his family's Wichterle & Kovářík engineering company. In 2024, Wikov acquired the Litostroj group, adding hydropower equipment to its established industrial business.

== History ==
=== Formation and early development ===
The modern Wikov business began in 2002, when Martin Wichterle acquired a majority stake in ČKD Hronov, an engineering company that manufactured industrial gearboxes.

In 2004, Wichterle acquired Škoda Gear in Plzeň, previously part of Škoda Works, and the British engineering company Orbital 2. The engineering businesses were later brought together under Wikov Industry.

The Wikov name had originally been used by Wichterle & Kovářík, a Czechoslovak engineering company formed in 1918 that manufactured machinery and automobiles. The historical company was nationalised after the Second World War, and Wichterle revived the Wikov brand in 2005 for his engineering businesses.

The company experienced a downturn in the mid-2010s, with management describing 2016 as its most difficult year since the beginning of its modern history, before returning to growth.

In 2016, Wikov expanded into automotive components by acquiring three companies, Detail CZ, Detail Plus and Detail Produkt, which supplied engine, chassis and gearbox parts to manufacturers of trucks and construction machinery. Together they had annual revenue of around CZK 400 million and employed 210 people.

=== International expansion ===
In March 2019, Wikov acquired Gmeinder Getriebe Gruppe in Mosbach, Germany, a manufacturer and service provider of gearboxes for rail vehicles. The acquisition expanded Wikov's activities in the railway sector.

Also in 2019, Wikov opened a gearbox factory near Moscow. Following the Russian invasion of Ukraine, control of the Russian business passed to its Russian partners, and Wichterle said in 2026 that the company had written off its stake.

The company expanded further outside Europe in the 2020s. Wikov entered Canada in 2023 by acquiring Pacific Rim Engineered Products and Wessex Precision Machining. The same year, it established Wikov Indigear in Pune, India. In 2024, Wikov acquired Canadian gearbox manufacturer Havlik Gear, which became Wikov Gear Canada.

At the start of 2026, the group opened Wikov Gear US in Houston, Texas.

=== Acquisition of Litostroj ===
In October 2024, Wikov agreed to acquire the industrial operations of Energo-Pro Industries, centred on the Litostroj hydropower business. The transaction included Litostroj companies in Slovenia, the Czech Republic, Canada and the United States. Litostroj had annual revenue of about CZK 2 billion at the time.

Litostroj designs and manufactures turbines and other equipment for hydroelectric power plants and provides engineering and maintenance services. The acquisition gave Wikov a substantial hydropower business.

On 1 January 2026, the parent company changed its name from Wikov Industry to Wikov Group.

Group revenue rose from about CZK 1.7 billion in the mid-2010s to CZK 6.6 billion in 2025. The increase included the effect of the Litostroj acquisition. Wichterle expected revenue to exceed CZK 7 billion in 2026.

== Business divisions ==
The Gear division operates mainly under the Wikov and Gmeinder brands. It produces industrial gearboxes, gears and complete drive systems and provides related services. The division has operations in the Czech Republic, Germany, Canada, the United States and India.

The Hydro division operates under the Litostroj brand. It develops, manufactures and services turbines and related equipment for hydroelectric and pumped-storage power plants. The division includes Litostroj Power in Slovenia, Litostroj Engineering in the Czech Republic, Litostroj Hydro in Canada and Litostroj US in the United States.

In 2026, Litostroj Engineering was selected to carry out the modernisation of the Orlík hydroelectric power station for ČEZ. The approximately CZK 8 billion project includes converting two of the plant's four generating units for reversible pumped-storage operation.
