= Wikov =

Czechoslovak machinery manufacturer

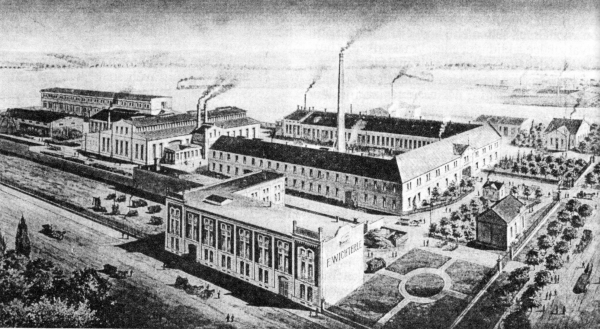
The factory of Wichterle & Kovářik around 1900

Wichterle & Kovářik was a Czechoslovak machinery manufacturer based in Prostějov. They produced cars and trucks from 1925 to 1937.

== Development ==
František Wichterle founded a small factory in Prostějov, 1878 where he built agricultural vehicles. Dr František Kovařík owned a similar company in the same town who produced similar machinery. On 22 December 1918, the two companies merged into a joint-stock company Wichterle & Kovářik Ltd. After experimenting with different prototypes, including buying a chassis from Italian engineering company Ansaldo, mass production did not begin until 1925 (or 1927 according to some sources) with the model 7/28. Production of the cars were discontinued in 1937 and continued producing small trucks until 1940 after the German occupation of Czechoslovakia during World War 2.

After the Second World War, Wichterle & Kovářík was nationalised. In the 2000s, Czech businessman Martin Wichterle, a descendant of the founding family, revived the Wikov name for the modern engineering company Wikov Group.

== Models ==
=== Prototypes ===
The first vehicle that was built under license of Ansaldo, only five prototypes were made from 1922. They had a four-cylinder four-stroke engine with a 1000 cc displacement but later increased to 1250 cc and then 1350 cc. They later experiment making a more powerful and better-equipped car with displacement of up to 1500 cc. From 1924 and spring of 1925, around 5 4/16 hp (1250 cc) prototypes were developed and produced. By the end of 1925, 15 5/20 hp (1350 cc) prototypes were produced.

=== Model 7/28 ===
The first mass-production model. Produced from 1925 (or 1927) to 1932 with 280 examples built. Powered by a 1478 cc four-cylinder engine offering 28 hp or 40 hp. The engine had hardened cylinder barrels, silumin engine block, 12 V battery ignition and dry disc clutch. It had a top speed of 44 mph. During its production, several body types were offered, including an open tourer, faux cabriolet and limousine. They also made a two-seater sport model called the 7/28 Sport.

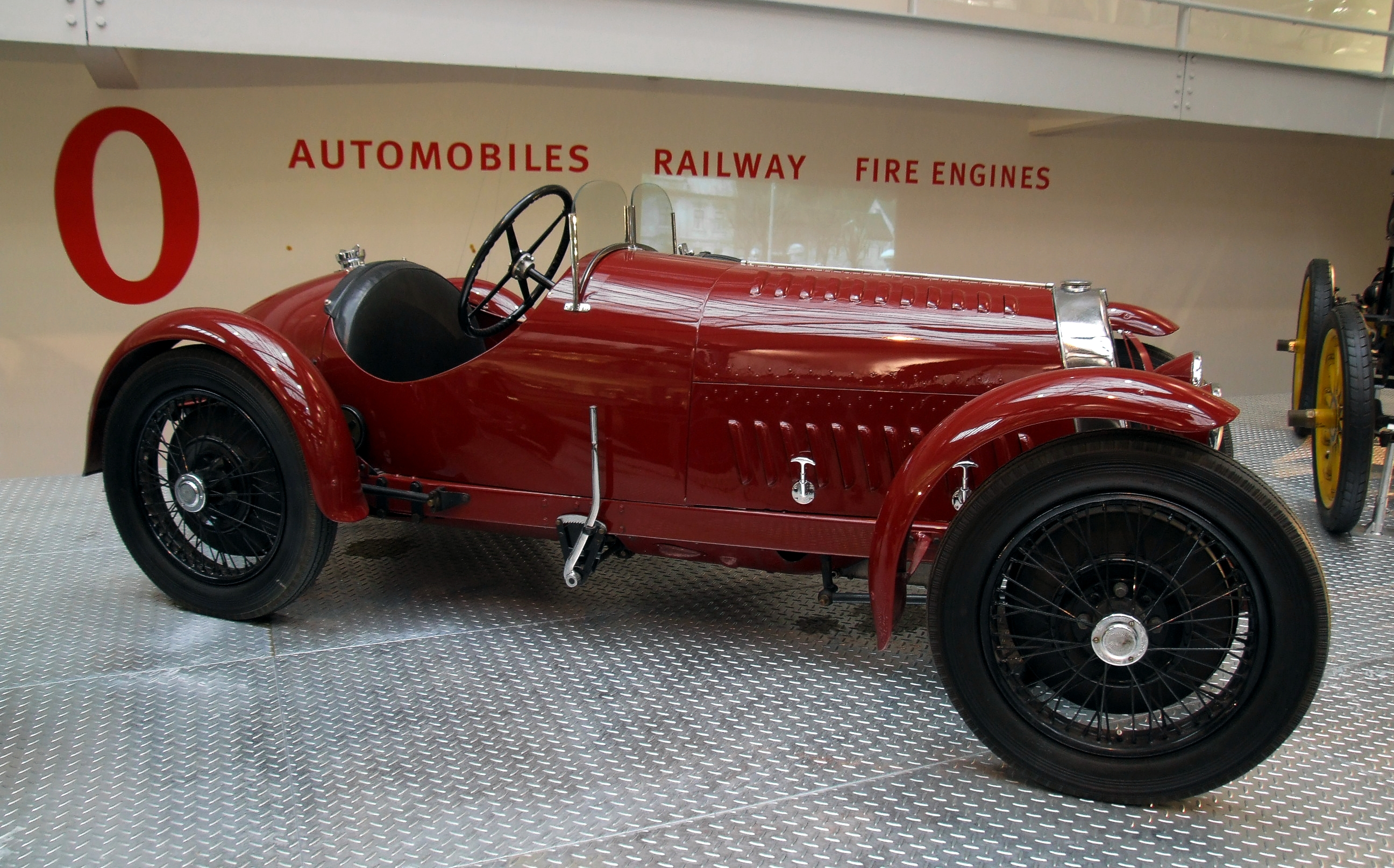
Wikov 7/28 Sport from 1931

=== Model 35 ===
Built from 1930 to 1935, 150 examples were built. The 1743 cc four-cylinder engine produced 35 hp. It was offered in a four-seater phaeton, four- or six-seater limousine, open tourer, cabriolet or a landaulet body.

In 1931, they experimented with streamlining by fitting an aerodynamic body on a Type 35 chassis. Mass production were planned but setbacks caused it to never happen. Despite being well received by the press, the public wasn't ready for it. It was also expensive to produce and the performance and fuel consumption was lacklustre. Only 6 examples were made.

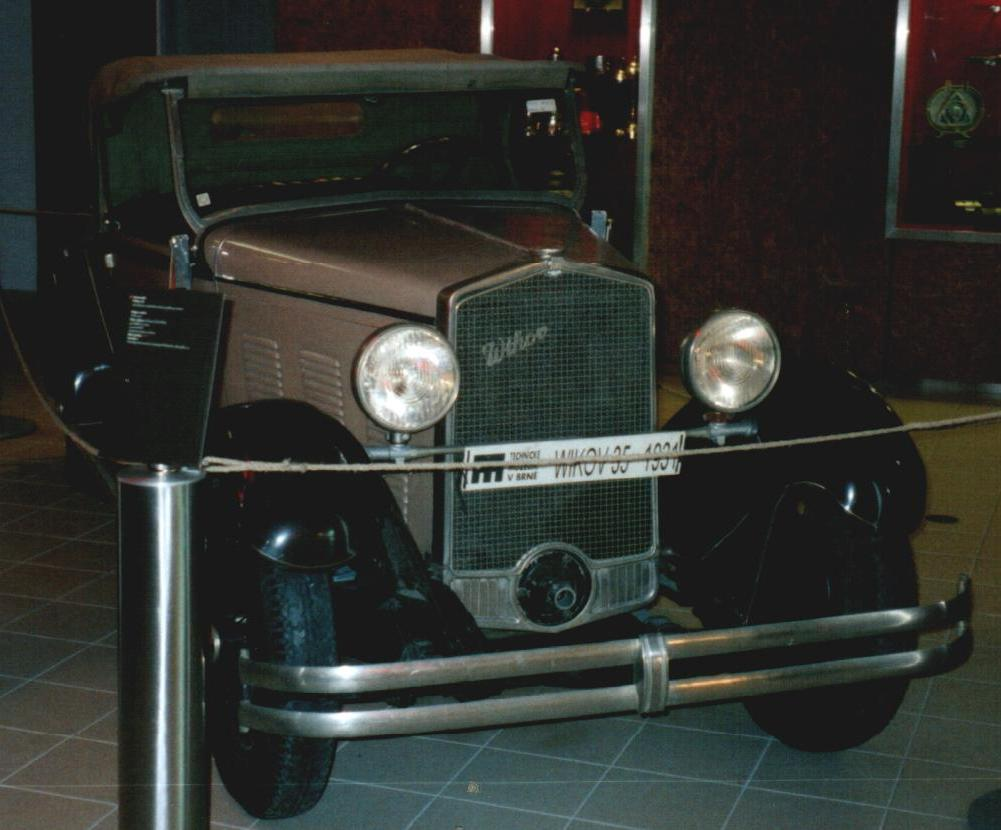
Wikov 35 from 1931

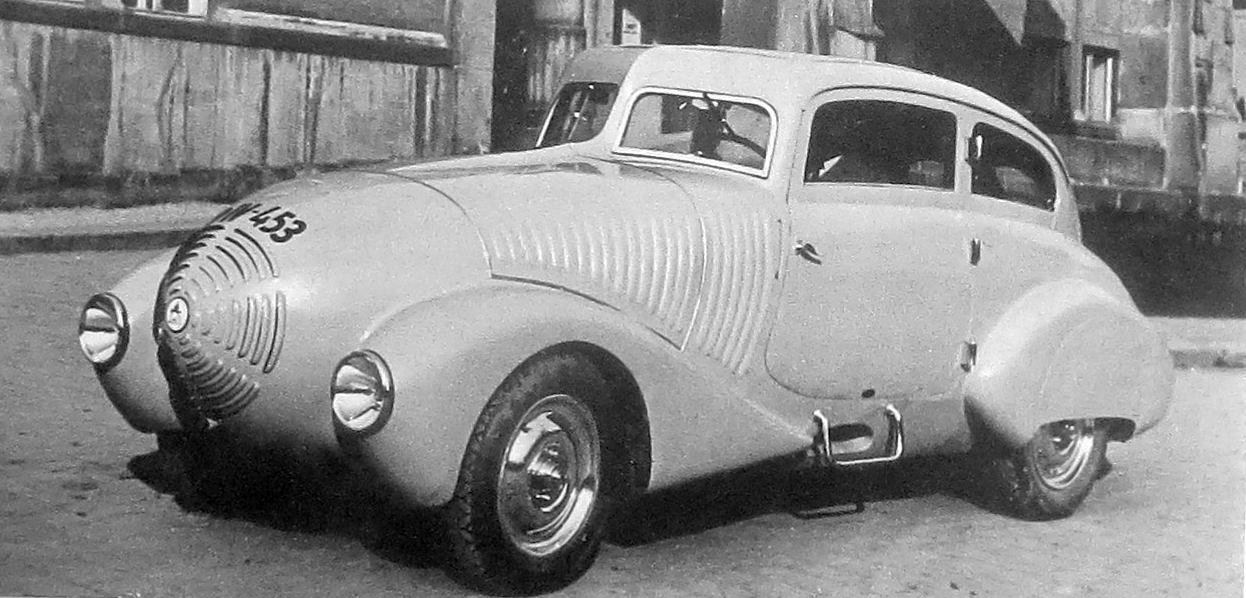
Wikov 35 "Kapka" from 1930 with streamlined body

=== Model 40 ===
The Model 40 was Wikov's most successful model. From 1933 to 1935, 330 examples were produced. The 1942 cc four-cylinder engine produced 43 hp. It had a choice of two bodies, a four- or six-seater saloon.

In 1934, Czech racer, Adolf Szczyzycki won the 1000 mil československých (1000 Miles of Czechoslovakia) in the 2000 cc class using a Wikov 40.

=== Model 70 ===
The Model 70 was the largest model. Only four prototypes were produced from 1933 to 1935. It combined two four-cylinder engines borrowed from the Model 35 which resulted in a 3486 cc eight-cylinder engine producing 70 hp.

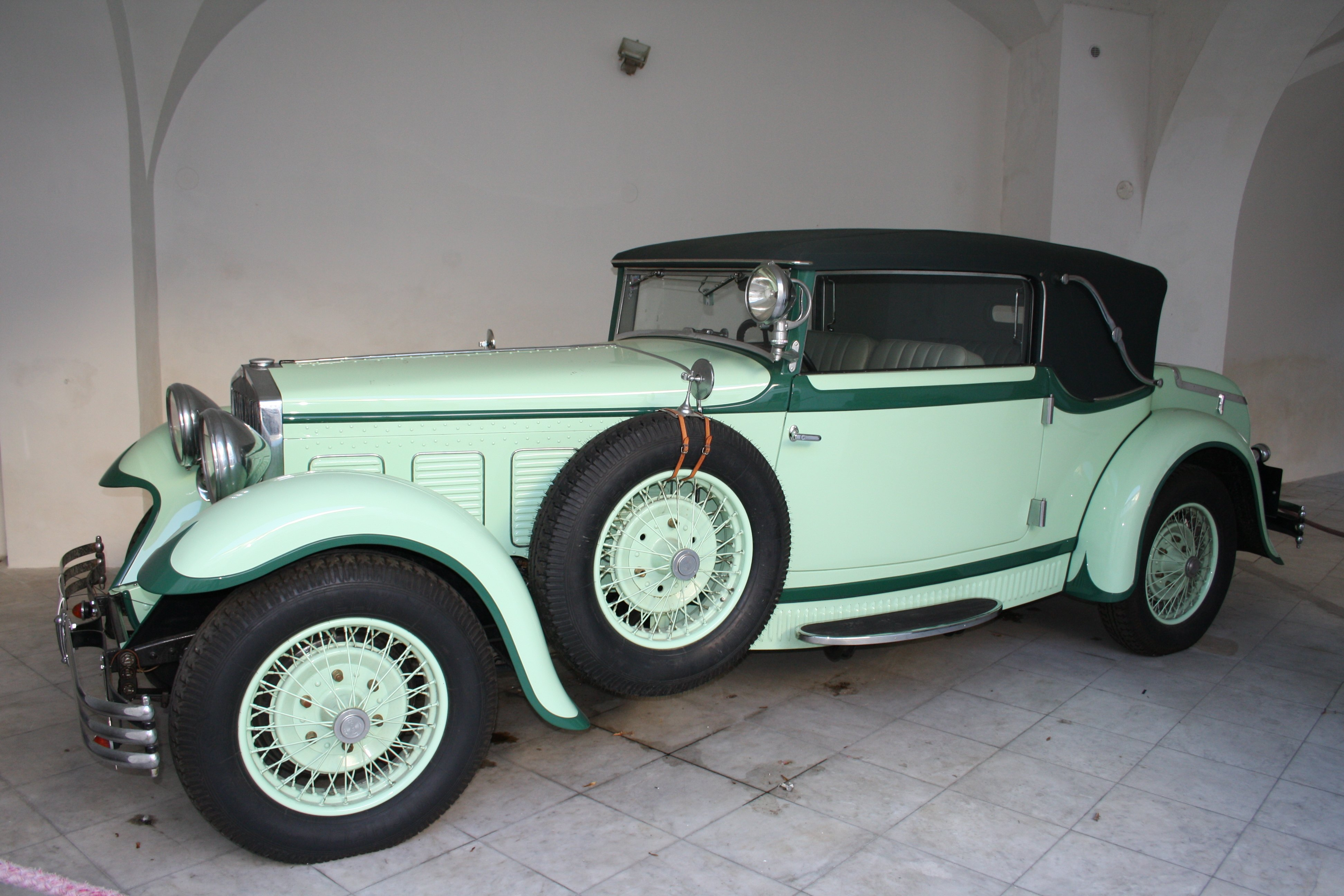
Wikov 70 from 1933

== Literature ==
- Harald H. Linz, Halwart Schrader: Die große Automobil-Enzyklopädie. BLV, München 1986, ISBN 3-405-12974-5.
- Adolf Kuba, Milan Spremo: Atlas našich automobilů. 1929-1936. Nadas, 1989, ISBN 80-7030-049-3.
- Oldtimer Markt. Issue 07/1989.
