= Omega (car) =

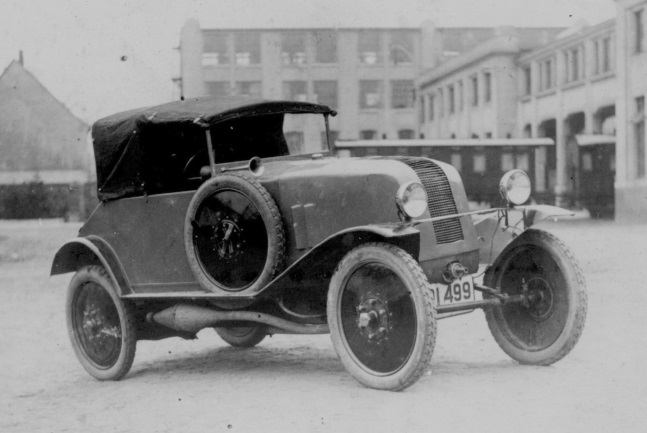
- The Omega during the demonstration on 18 October 1923 with the bonnet and canvas roof on.

Overview
- Manufacturer: Zbrojovka Brno
- Production: 1923 (2 made)
- Assembly: Brno
- Designer: Břetislav Novotný

Body and chassis
- Class: Cyclecar
- Layout: FR layout

Dimensions
- Wheelbase: 2,450 mm (96.5 in)
- Length: 3,200 mm (126.0 in)
- Curb weight: 650 kg (1,430 lb)

Chronology
- Predecessor: Novo
- Successor: Disk

The Omega was a Czech automobile prototype designed by Břetislav Novotný. The prototype subsequently became the first automobile model by Československá zbrojovka, akc.spol. with a modified version called Disk.

The Omega was Břetislav Novotný second attempt at making an affordable cyclecar. The design almost identical to his previous prototype, the Novo but was now powered by a water-cooled 600cc two-stroke four-cylinder engine with an output of 10 hp (7 kW; 10 PS). It had a curved tubular radiator, coming over the engine and forming the frame of the bonnet. A design Novotný learnt when studying in aeronautical designs. It had a wheelbase of 2450 mm and an overall length of around 3500 mm. Like the Novo, it had friction gears and improved rubber lining in the aluminium disc attached to the flywheel, making it easier to replace. The rear chain drive system was also kept.

The prototype was presented to the board of directors of Československá zbrojovka, akc.spol. who was looking for designers to build their first car on 18 October 1923, they were pleased with the initial results but want to carry out more testing on the car. In December 1923, another prototype was built and two cars went on a test tour which was a success, however the company insisted on some modification and further tests. They wanted the car to have more than two seats, the ignition system improved and the cooling system to be strengthened. In January 1924, Zbrojovka's board of directors renamed the car to Diskos (abbreviated to Disk) since the Omega brand was already trademarked. Both cars went further modifications and 5 more test prototypes were built in mid 1924. The unique tubular radiator was replaced by a more conventional one. New body types including a three-seater and a four-seater was also being trialled.

Since the modifications increased the weight of the car and the rear chain drive system was deemed no longer reliable so it was replaced with a drive shaft with gears. Testing continued and around 50 Disk cars were produced by the end of 1924. Despite having enough orders to produce more Disk cars, the board of directors of the newly formed joint-stock company ceased sales, In January 1925, the board ordered new tests on the car which were successful but strayed too far from their original project of making a cheap and reliable car and so the Omega-Disk project was terminated.

Neither of the two prototypes of the chain-driven Omega survived but the original engine and the almost-complete production documentations including detailed drawings of the small parts survived. 92 years after the first prototype was made, an exact fully functional replica was made and was presented to the public in March 2015 at the Classic Show Brno 2015.

== Gallery ==
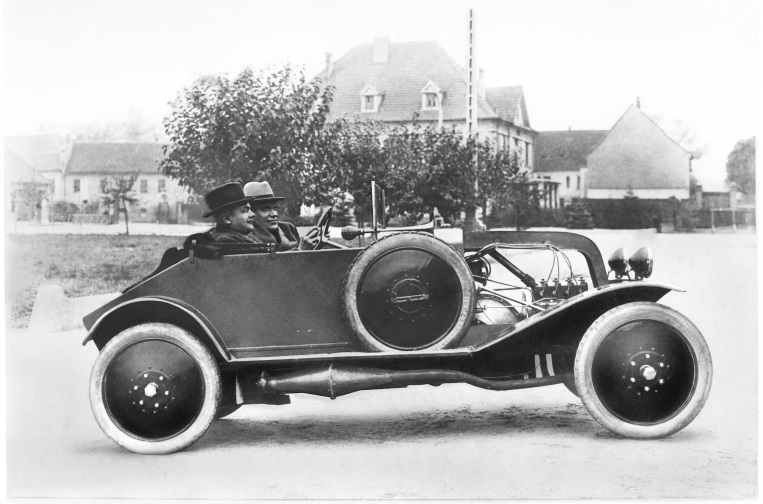
The Omega during the demonstration on 18 October 1923 in the factory yard

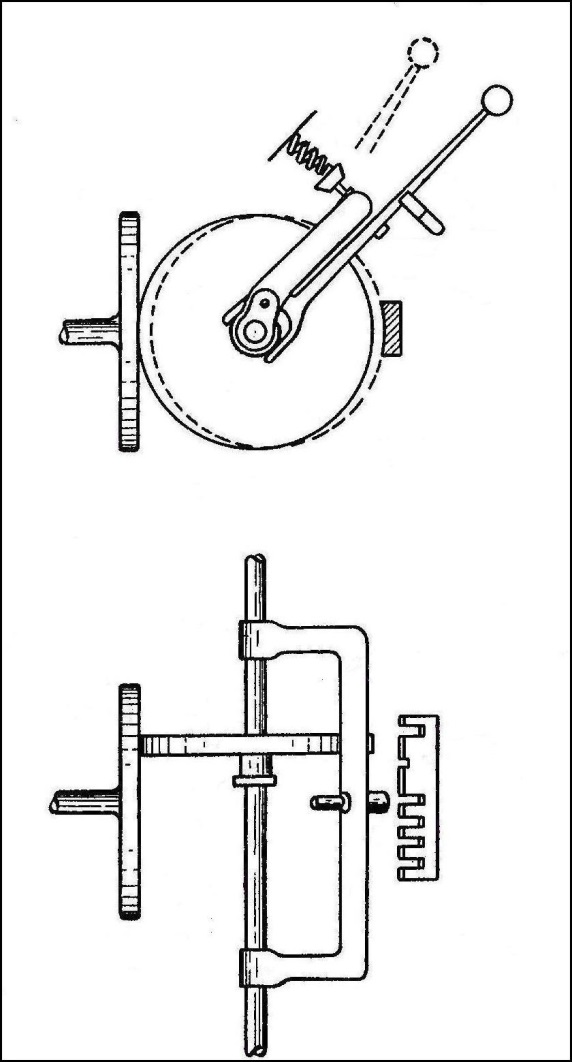
Omega car friction transfer scheme from patent application No 13572

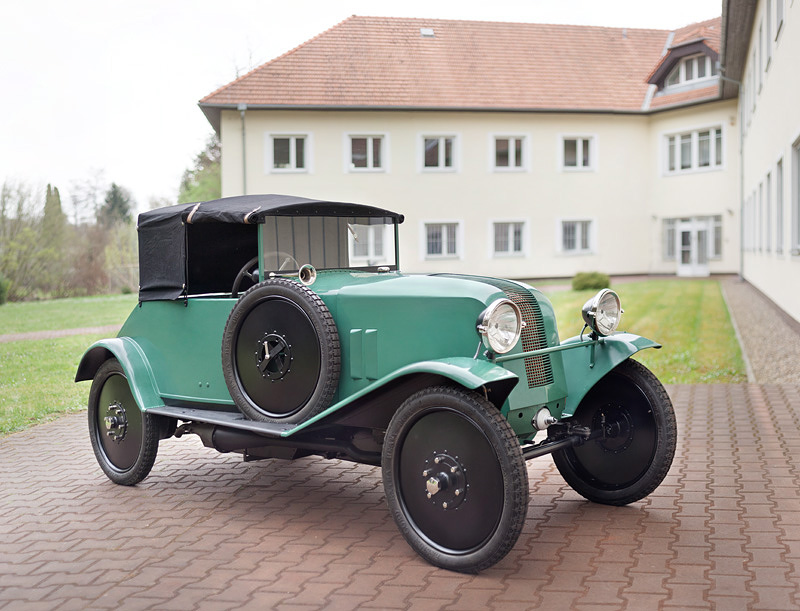
Replica of the Omega car, made according to the original factory documentation in April 2015
