= Amebis =

Slovenian language technology company

- Company type: Private
- Industry: Language Technology
- Headquarters: Kamnik, Slovenia
- Key people: Iztok Grilc, Miro Romih
- Products: Encyclopedic dictionary Spell checker Speech synthesis
- Website: www.amebis.si

Amebis from Kamnik is a company in Slovenia in the field of language technologies. The company has published several electronic dictionaries and encyclopedic dictionaries (e.g. ASP (32) dictionaries) and developed spell checkers, grammar checker Besana, hyphenators and lemmatizers for Slovene, Serbian and Albanian languages. The company maintains and edits the largest Slovenian dictionary portal Termania, which contains more than 135 dictionaries. The most used terminological dictionary on Termania is the Slovenian medical dictionary. In co-operation with company Alpineon and the Jožef Stefan Institute they have developed a speech synthesizer and screen reader Govorec (Speaker). They have also provided technical support for the largest text corpus of Slovene, called FidaPLUS, Fran and Franček.

Amebis also developed the system of machine translation Amebis Presis, which incorporates the Slovenian language.

On 11 October 2023 Amebis received award of the Father Stanislav Škrabec Foundation for special achievements in Slovene linguistics.

== See also ==
- Babelnet
- vidby
- Deepl
