= Stelka =

Czech automobile manufacturer

Rudolf Stelšovský, výroba automobilů
- Industry: Automotive
- Founded: 1922
- Founder: Rudolf Stelšovský
- Defunct: 1924
- Fate: Formed as a joint-stock company and rebranded as ASPA
- Headquarters: Příbram, Czech Republic
- Products: Automobiles

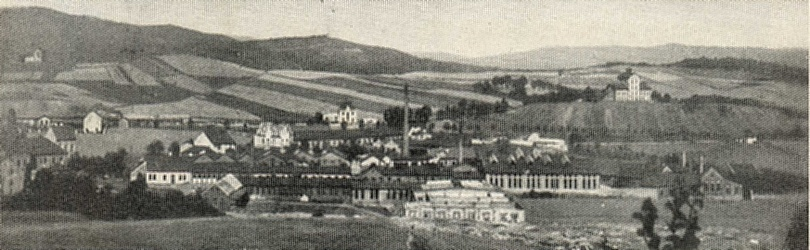
View of the factory

Rudolf Stelšovský, výroba automobilů was a Czech automobile manufacturer.

== History ==
Originally established in 1899 by Rudolf Stelšovský and produced farm machineries. In 1922 Stelšovský started producing cars under the brand name, Stelka. It was designed by Jan Švejda. In 1924, it was discontinued due to the lack of interest of customers and the unreliability of cars at the time.

== Vehicles ==
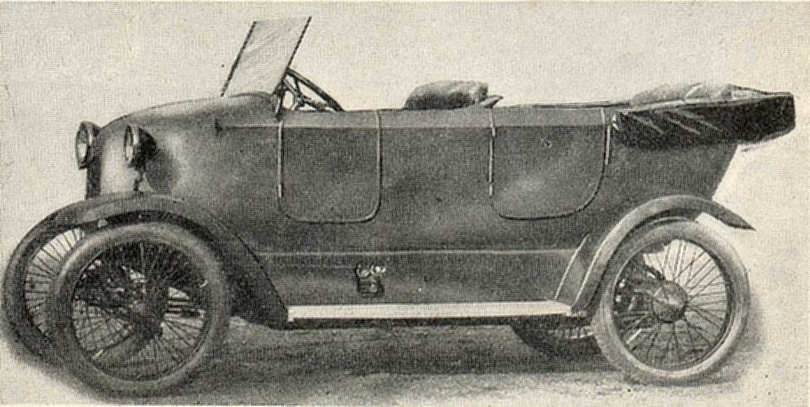
1924 Stelka

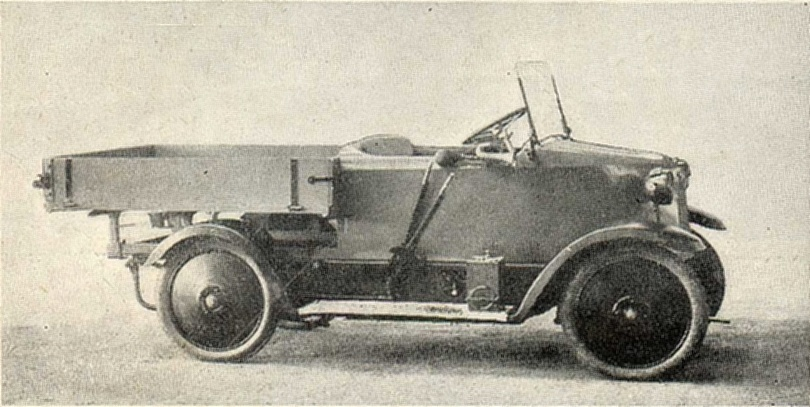
1924 Stelka pickup

Their only model was a four-seater powered by a four-stroke two-cylinder side-valve air-cooled engine with 90 mm bore and 90 mm stroke and a displacement of 1145cc. It had an output of around 17 kW (23 hp; 23 PS) and a top speed of around 50–60 km/h (31–37 mph). It had three forward and reverse speeds with the shifting lever constructed outside the bodywork and the engine power was transferred to the rear axle by a chain. The chassis weight only 300 kg. It was priced at 29,000 Kc which made it the cheapest vehicle showed at the 1923 Prague Motor Show.

At some point, a two-seater commercial pickup version of the Stelka car with a wooden loading area was also produced. It is unknown if this version was put in production or was a one-off.

== Gallery ==
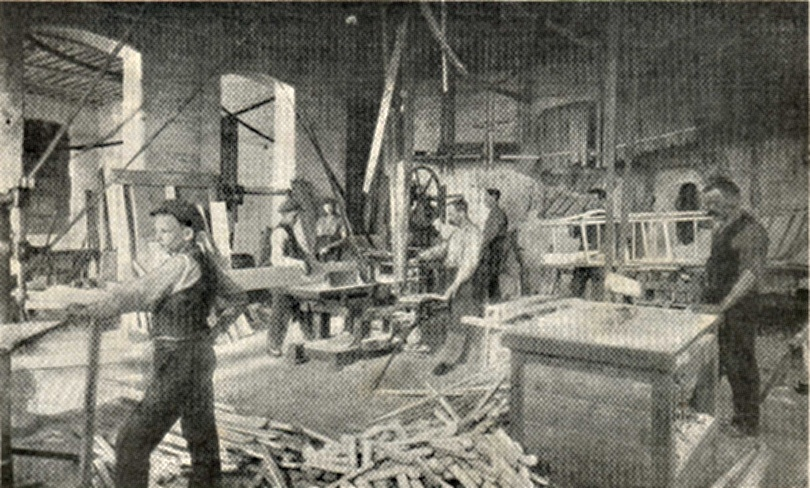
Production of bodywork for the Stelka cars

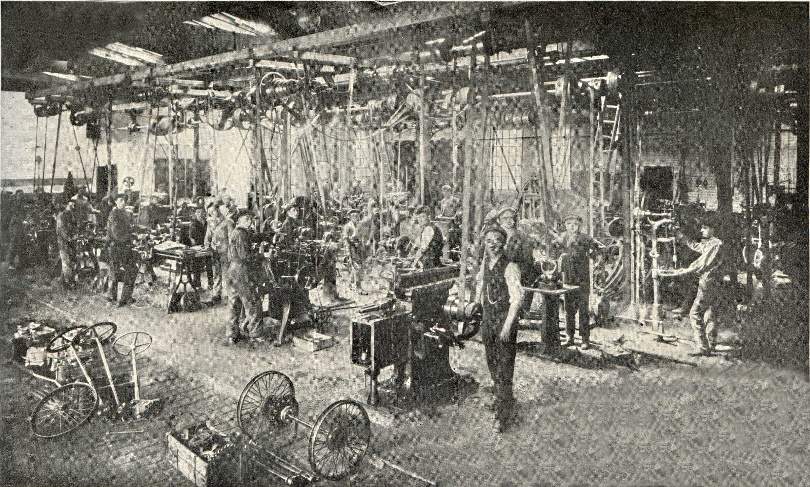
Mechanical workshop with modern machine tools for the production of the Stelka cars

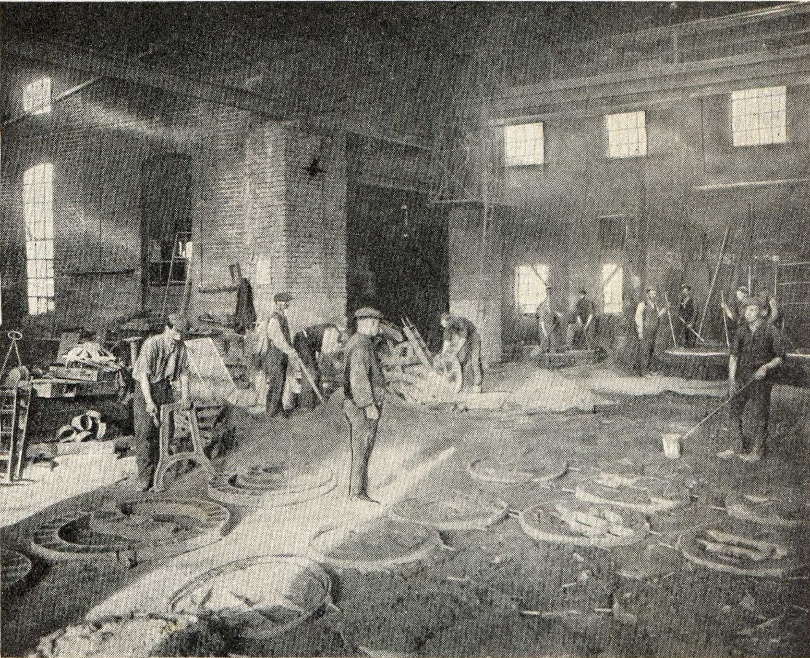
One of the four foundries Stelšovský factory, showing the sand treatment plant.

== Literature ==
- Harald H. Linz, Halwart Schrader: Die Internationale Automobil-Enzyklopädie. United Soft Media Verlag, Munich 2008, ISBN 978-3-8032-9876-8. (German)
- George Nicholas Georgano (Editor-in-chief.): The Beaulieu Encyclopedia of the Automobile. Band 2: P–Z. Fitzroy Dearborn Publishers, Chicago 2001, ISBN 1-57958-293-1. (English).
