= Baer (car) =

Motorenfabrik Paul Baer GmbH
- Company type: Private (GmbH)
- Industry: Automotive
- Founded: 1908
- Founder: Paul Baer
- Defunct: 1924 or 1926
- Headquarters: Berlin, Germany
- Products: Automobiles, Engines

Motorenfabrik Paul Baer GmbH was a German engine and automobile manufacturer.

The company was founded in Berlin 1908 to make engines which were supplied to several early automobile manufacturers. Between 1920 and 1926, a small car was built in the city under the brand Baer.

The 4/14 hp car was powered by a 770cc two-cylinder two-stroke engine with a bore of 70 mm and a stroke of 110 mm. The engine power reached up to 17 horsepower. This allowed the vehicle with a four-speed transmission speeds up to 80 km/h. The length was 3350 mm, the width 1400 mm. The track gauge was 1200 mm and the wheelbase was 2550 mm. The total weight was 750 kg, of which 350 kg were on the front axle and 400 kg on the rear axle. The company Baer also delivered its engines to the sports boat industry.

One of the vehicle took part in the small car race at the AVUS in Berlin in 1923.

== Gallery ==
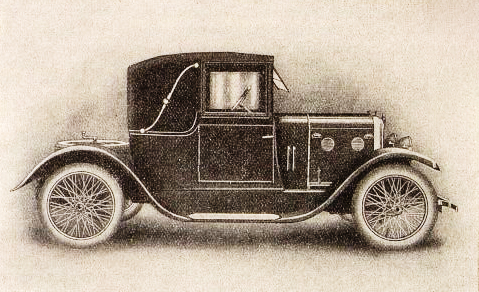
4/14 hp Baer Cabriolet (Closed Roof)

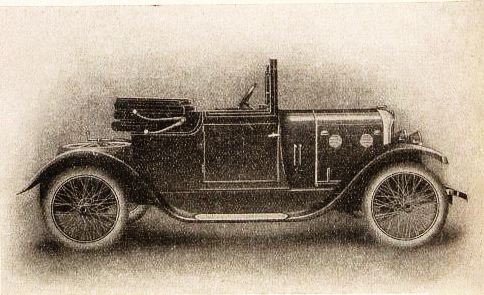
4/14 hp Baer Cabriolet (Opened Roof)

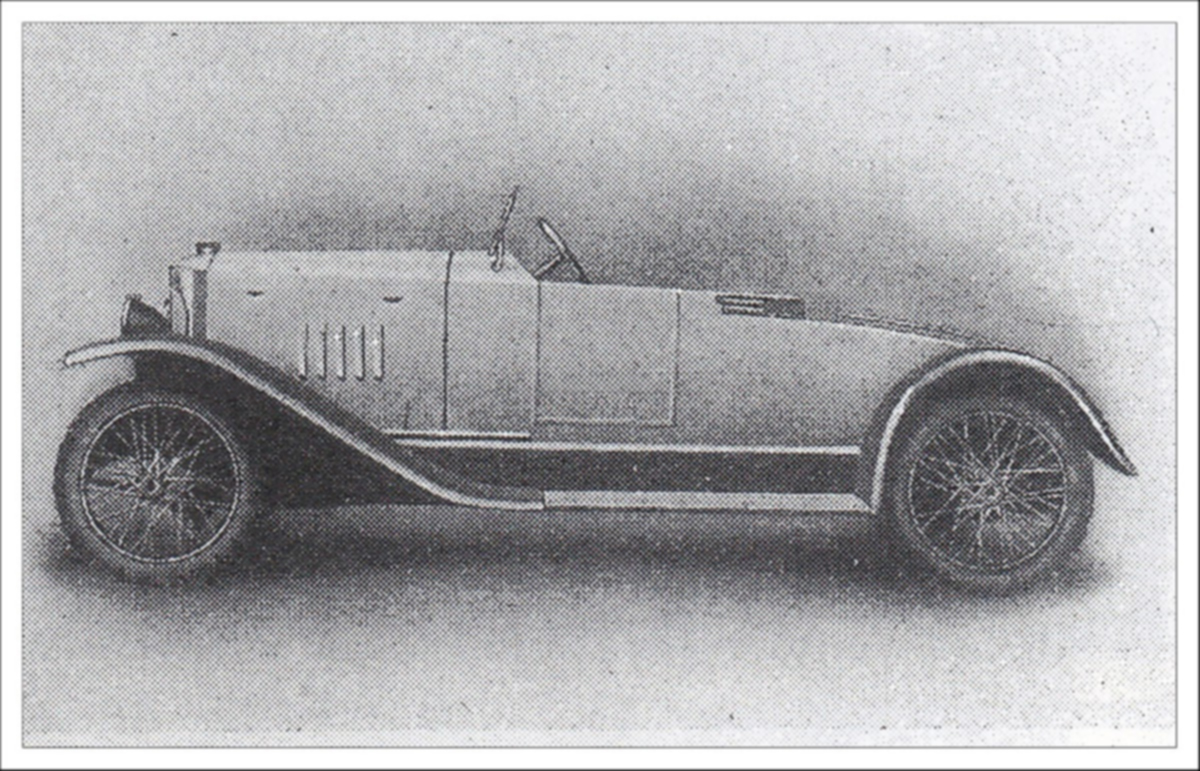
Baer Roadster

== Literature ==
- George Nicholas Georgano (Editor-in-chief.): The Beaulieu Encyclopedia of the Automobile. Band 1: A–F. Fitzroy Dearborn Publishers, Chicago 2001, ISBN 1-57958-293-1. (English).
- Werner Oswald: Deutsche Autos 1920–1945. 10th edition, Motorbuch Verlag, Stuttgart 1996, ISBN 3-87943-519-7, p. 434 (German).
