= JK 2500 =

The JK 2500 was a prototype sports car using a Alfa Romeo engine, made in 1954. Construction and planning began in 1951. The car is named after the designer, Július Kubinský (1923, Prievidza). The car was originally fitted with a 2500 cc Alfa-Romeo engine, but it was later replaced with an air-cooled Tatra T603. With the V8 the top speed was 207 km/h (129 mph). It was used for 13 or 14 years by its designer, however, it has not been seen in several decades.
