= Automated valuation model =

Real estate valuation calculation system

An Automated Valuation Model (AVM) is a system for the valuation of real estate that provides a value of a specified property at a specified date, using mathematical modelling techniques in an automated manner. AVMs are Statistical Valuation Methods and divide into Comparables Based AVMs and Hedonic Models. Other Statistical Valuation Methods are House Price Indices and Single Parameter Valuations.

== Comparables Based AVM vs. Hedonic Models ==
Comparables Based AVMs select comparables for each individual valuation based on the characteristics of the property to be valued. They therefore operate similarly to how an appraiser would work when valuing properties through the sales comparison approach. Hedonic Models on the other hand try to isolate the impact of individual property characteristics in the form of pre-calculated parameters. When doing a valuation using hedonic models no actual comparison or automated processes take place, but the value is instead calculated by filling property characteristics into specific mathematical equations that contain the pre-defined parameters. Because Comparables Based AVM select comparables based on the individual property to be valued, the valuation result can be traced. This is not the case with Hedonic Models. Hedonic Models also rely on more generalizations as they only consider those variables that have been parameterized in the mathematical equations they use.

As base of data AVMs can use sale prices, values from previous valuations or asking prices.

== Usage ==
Appraisers, investment professionals and lending institutions use AVM technology in their analysis of residential property. An AVM is a residential valuation report that can be obtained in a matter of milliseconds. It is a technology-driven report. The product of an automated valuation technology comes from the analysis of public record data and computer decision logic combined to provide a calculated estimate of a probable value of a residential property. An AVM uses a combination of two or more types of evaluation, - but most commonly, a hedonic model and a repeat transaction index. The result of each model is given a Confidence Score and then weighted by that score, analyzed and then reported as a final estimate of value based on a specified date.

An AVM typically includes:

- An indicative market value (capital value or rental value) for a single residential property.
- Information on the subject property and recent history of like properties.
- Comparable sales analysis of like properties.
- Current like properties being actively marketed.

In the late 1990s, in the US, this technology was used primarily by institutional investors to determine risk when purchasing collateralized mortgage loans. AVMs gained traction in the UK in the early 2000's with the emergence of UKValuation and Hometrack. In 2024, the quality and availability of real estate data in Dubai enabled the launch of YallaValue, one of the first public AVMs in the region to gain traction.

== Advantages ==
AVMs are increasingly used by mortgage lenders to determine what a property might be worth in order for them to lend against the valuation. The advantages of using AVMs over traditional appraisals are that they save time, money and resources (e.g. there are no transport requirements), thus lowering the cost of valuing a property. Many AVMs can be used with little cost, so more choices in valuation methodology are also possible. It is claimed that unlike traditional appraisals, AVM outputs do not suffer from the same fraud risk although certain providers can have their systems manipulated intentionally or otherwise if property features are incorrectly entered. AVMs remove the human element from the valuation process and rely on computer objectivity so as to remove human bias and subjectivity.

AVMs are particularly useful in assessing the value of a property portfolio. Using an automated model can also be useful for valuing an individual property where the provider can deliver a suitable level of accuracy.

== Disadvantages ==
The disadvantages are that they do not take into account the property condition, as a physical inspection of the property does not occur and therefore the valuation produced assumes an average condition which may not reflect current reality. Purchasers relying on an AVM-backed mortgage application will need to get separate advice to establish the true condition of the property. New build property is particularly difficult to value due to the lack of comparable properties and historic data; however, an advantage of AVMs is that they pull on a larger pool of comparables and as such are not prone to incorporating the claimed 'new-build premium', although it would rely on comparables from physical inspections to achieve this. Other data sources used are sometimes misleading due to concealed incentives in recorded sales prices (e.g. Land Registry). AVMs also do not work particularly well on large blocks of flats where aspect can have a significant effect on value.

Initial concern over the effectiveness of AVMs in falling markets have now been answered as the best performing models have remained highly effective throughout the latest downturns although their use for "retrospective valuations" has contributed to wasteful activity in some areas – this is not a fault of the tools but a lack of appreciation by some of those using them.

Many AVMs are also using transactional data, which may lag anywhere from three to six months, although surveyors are similarly restricted in terms of data recency. Therefore, this is a good data source, but still does not account for changes in current market conditions.

AVM's have been used by mortgage lenders in increasing numbers over the last 15 years, and are particularly effective where the housing stock is very generic, such as newer housing estates. In areas with a larger variety of property types and styles it is much less effective. Most high loan to value ratio loans will require a physical inspection, with lower risk mortgages or borrowers being assessed via a AVM.
