= ASPA (car) =

Příbramská strojírna a slévárna
- Company type: Joint-stock company
- Industry: Automotive
- Founded: 1924
- Defunct: 1929
- Headquarters: Příbram, Czech Republic
- Products: Automobiles

Příbramská strojírna a slévárna was a Czech automobile manufacturer, a successor to the Stelka.

== History ==
The company was founded in Příbram. It started producing automobiles in 1924 under the brand name, ASPA. Production ended in 1929.

== Vehicles ==
The first model was powered by the four-cylinder engine of the Ford Model T. Another model, referred to as Type B 5/15 HP, 5/14 HP or Type B depending on the source, had a water-cooled four-cylinder engine with 1327cc displacement and an output of 15 hp. The engine had OHV valve timing, magneto ignition, a Bosch starter and a four-speed gearbox. The engine drove the rear wheels and weighted 650 kg. The open four-seater had only one door. 40 examples of this model were produced. Delivery vans and ambulances were also offered.

In 1926, the M 7/24 HP was introduced. Powered by a four-cylinder engine with 75 mm bore and 110 mm stroke and a displacement of 1944cc.

In 1933, 30 passenger cars, 4 vans, 1 bus and 1 ambulance of this manufacturer were registered in Czechoslovakia.

== Literature ==
- Harald H. Linz, Halwart Schrader: Die Internationale Automobil-Enzyklopädie. United Soft Media Verlag, Munich 2008, ISBN 978-3-8032-9876-8. (German)
- George Nicholas Georgano (Editor-in-chief.): The Beaulieu Encyclopedia of the Automobile. Band 1: A–F. Fitzroy Dearborn Publishers, Chicago 2001, ISBN 1-57958-293-1. (English).
- Marián Šuman-Hreblay: Encyklopedie automobilů. České a slovenské osobní automobily od roku 1815 do současnosti. Computer Press, Brünn 2007, ISBN 978-80-251-1587-9. (Czech)
