= 2017 Slovenian presidential election =

- 22 October 2017 (first round); 12 November 2017 (second round)
- Turnout: 44.22% (first round); 42.13% (second round)
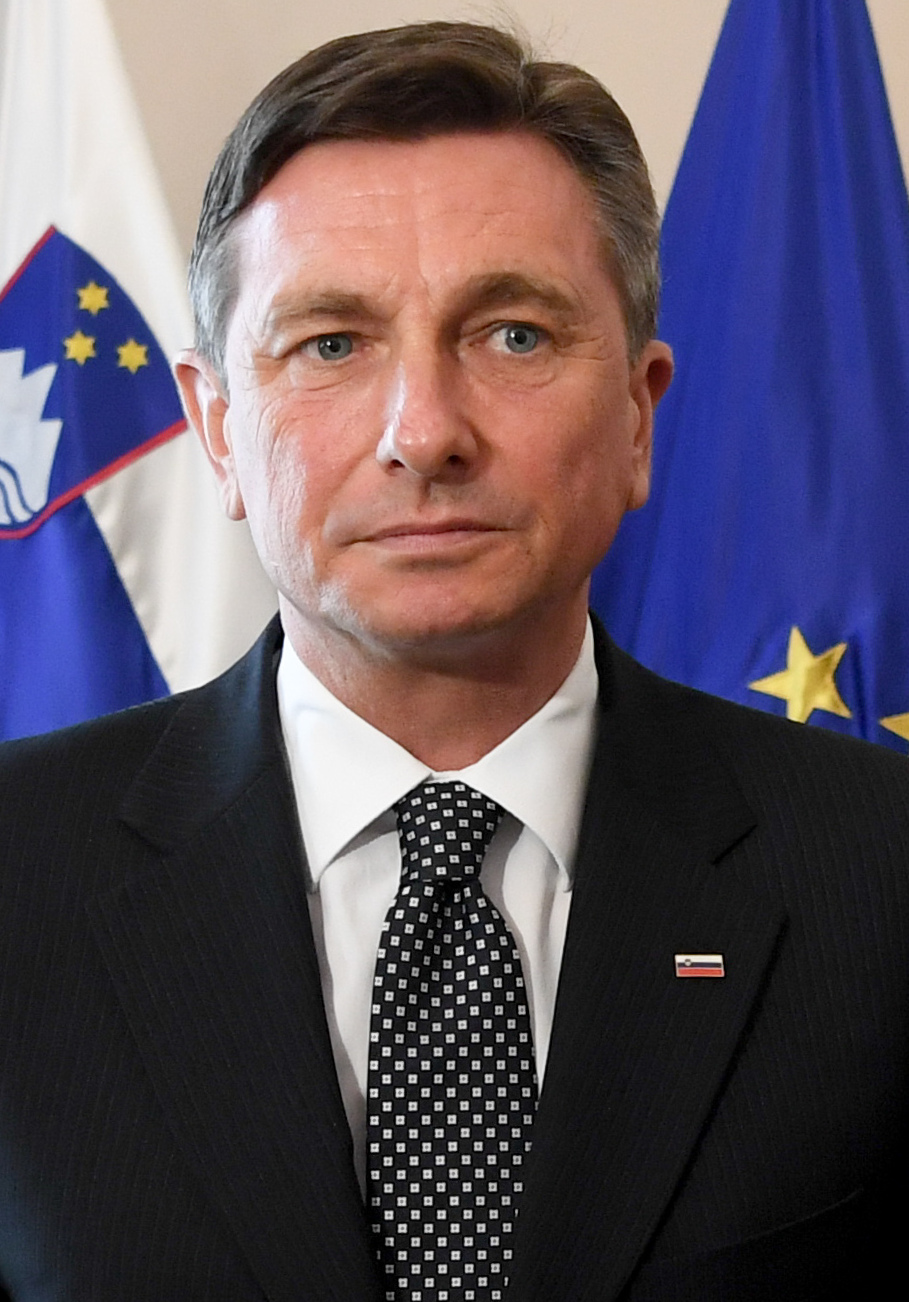

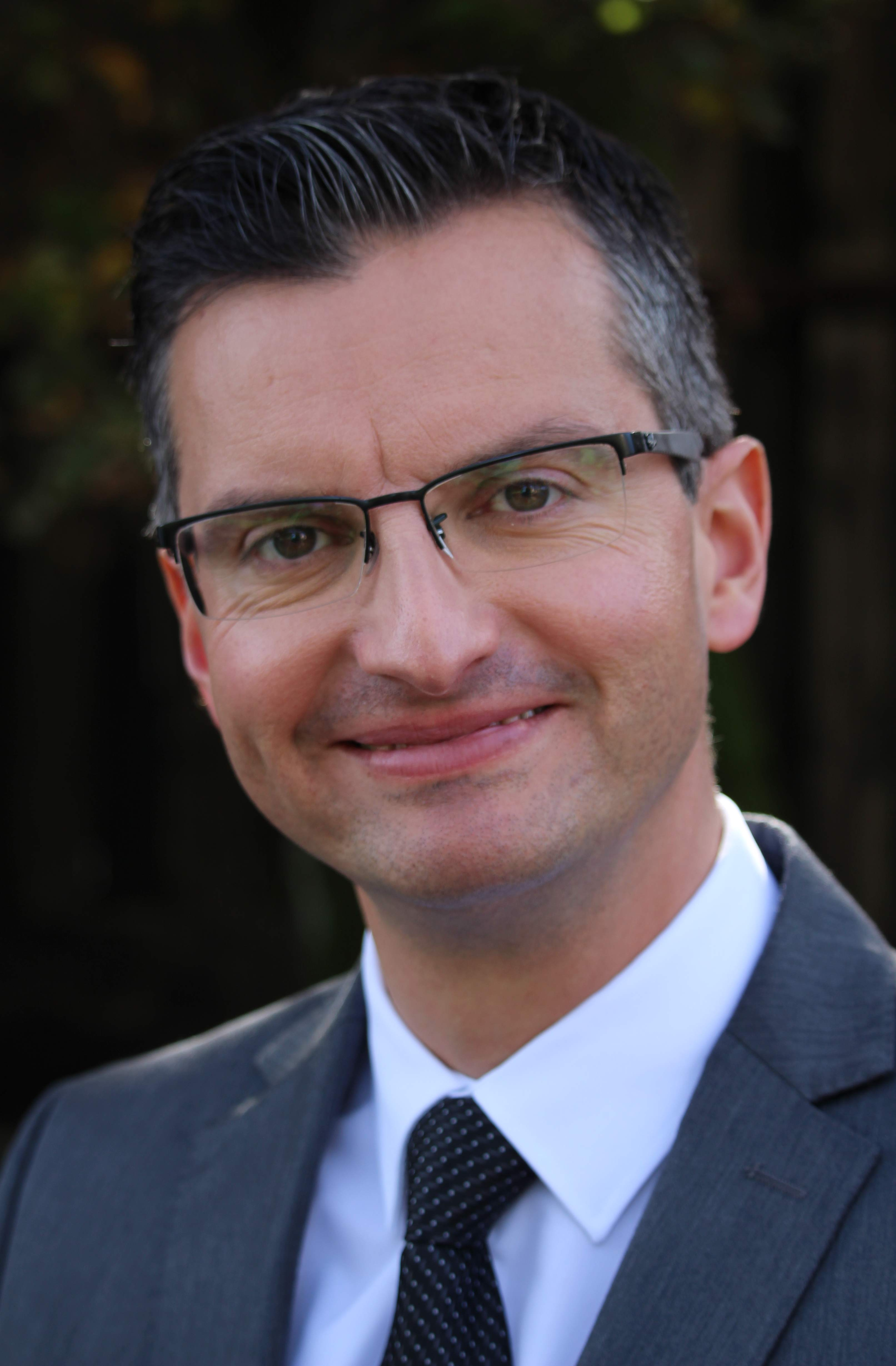
Nominee	Borut Pahor	Marjan Šarec
Party	Independent (Note: The President of Slovenia traditionally resigns from party membership after taking office. Although Pahor was officially an independent, his campaign was endorsed and funded by Social Democrats.)	LMŠ
Popular vote	378,307	334,239
Percentage	53.09%	46.91%

Pahor:
30–40%
40–50%
50–60%
60–70%
70–80%
Šarec:
30–40%
40–50%
50–60%
60–70%
70–80%
President before election
Borut Pahor
Independent
Elected President
Borut Pahor
Independent

Presidential elections were held in Slovenia on 22 October 2017. Nine candidates ran in the first round of the elections, in which the incumbent independent President Borut Pahor placed first and Marjan Šarec of the List of Marjan Šarec (LMŠ) placed second. No candidate received a majority of the vote in the first round, resulting in a run-off between Pahor and that was held on 12 November 2017. Pahor won the run-off with 53% of the vote; voter turnout in the second round was 42.13%, the lowest in any presidential election since independence.

== Electoral system ==
The President of Slovenia is elected using the two-round system; if no candidate receives a majority of the vote in the first round, the top two candidates contest a runoff.

Under Slovenia's election law, candidates for president are required to meet one of three criteria:

- The support of ten members of the National Assembly
- The support of one or more political parties and either three members of the National Assembly or signatures from 3,000 voters
- Signatures from 5,000 voters

Each political party can support only one candidate.

== Candidates ==
=== Borut Pahor ===
The incumbent president Borut Pahor announced his intention to run for a second term in December 2016. A member of Social Democrats, he later stated he intends to run as an independent candidate. Pahor was seen from June as a clear frontrunner to win the election.

=== Marjan Šarec ===
Marjan Šarec, the mayor of Kamnik, announced his candidacy in May. He had previously served two terms as mayor after a career as an actor and comedian. During his acting career, he imitated several famous people, including the second president of Slovenia, Janez Drnovšek. Nevertheless, Šarec stated his candidacy would be completely serious, as he took a break from his stage personas when he was elected mayor. Criticizing Pahor for treating the presidential function as a celebrity, Šarec was viewed as a potentially strong candidate. Backed by his party Lista Marjana Šarca - Naprej Kamnik, Šarec successfully collected the required 3,000 votes of support.

=== Ljudmila Novak ===
In early August, Ljudmila Novak of New Slovenia announced her candidacy, as the first candidate supported by a major political party, Novak officially submitted the candidacy on 8 September. Novak served as the mayor of Moravče, got elected to the European Parliament in 2004 and led the party at the 2011 general election when the party returned to the National Assembly.

=== Maja Makovec Brenčič ===
In September, the Modern Centre Party announced that their candidate would be Maja Makovec Brenčič, the minister of education, science, and sport. Before entering the politics, Makovec Brenčič was a professor at the Faculty of Economics, University of Ljubljana.

=== Romana Tomc ===
The Slovenian Democratic Party announced the member of European Parliament Romana Tomc as their candidate. Tomc was also elected to the National Assembly in the 2011 election and was the vice-president of the Assembly.

=== Boris Popovič ===
Boris Popovič, mayor of Koper, was backed by his party Slovenia Forever. Prior to the presidential election, Popovič served three terms as a mayor. He was involved in several legal cases.

=== Angelca Likovič ===
Angelca Likovič was backed by the party Voice for Children and Families. Prior to retirement, Likovič was a teacher and the headmistress of an elementary school O.Š. Majda Vrhovnik in Ljubljana. Likovič is also known as a prominent opponent of the same-sex marriage law in the 2015 referendum and as a commentator in various reality shows.

=== Andrej Šiško ===
Andrej Šiško was backed by the party United Slovenia. A former member of Slovenian Territorial Defence, Šiško was also the leader of the ultras group Viole, supporters of NK Maribor. He was convicted to a year and ten months in prison.

=== Suzana Lara Krause ===
Suzana Lara Krause was backed by Slovenian People's Party. Krause graduated as a teacher of Slovenian and Russian languages, is self-employed and was not widely known in Slovenian politics prior to the election.

=== Failed or withdrawn ===
Milan Jazbec, Slovenia's ambassador to Macedonia, announced already in April that he would run as an independent candidate. Jazbec stated that his decision was based on a promise to the late Slovenian statesman France Bučar that he would become actively involved with national politics. Due to lack of support, Jazbec dropped out of the race in September.

Zmago Jelinčič Plemeniti, a former member of the National Assembly and the president of the far right Slovenian National Party, announced he would run for office for the third time. Jelinčič previously ran in the 2002 election, where he finished 3rd with 8.49% of the vote, and in the 2007 election, where he finished fourth—but with a significantly higher vote share, at 19.16%.

Some people announced their candidacies with support of non-parliamentary political parties, including sociologist Luj Šprohar (backed by Liberal Democracy of Slovenia).

Other people that announced their intention to run for office, including Milan Robič, Jožef Jarh, Ludvik Poljanec, Aleš Cepič, a comedian Žiga Papež, singers Damjan Murko and Dominik Kozarič, poet, dramatist, and actor Andrej Rozman-Roza, and sociologist Valerija Korošec.

== Opinion polls ==
=== Hypothetical polling (– 28 September 2017) ===
Date(s)	Pollster	Sample size												
Date(s)	Pollster	Sample size	Pahor Ind	Šarec LMŠ	Novak NSi	Jelinčič	Jazbec	Rozman	Murko	Tomc SDS	Brenčič SMC	Popovič SJN	Likovič ZaO	Krause SLS
22 Sep	State Election Commission deadline to submit candidacy applications for review and confirmation													
23 Sep	Mediana	827	44.7%	17.2%	6.8%	–	1.5%	–	–	5.2%	1.2%	2.4%	2.4%	2.4%
15–17 Sep	Valicon	453	36.5%	24.4%	5.4%	–	–	–	–	5.0%	3.2%	–	–	–
11–13 Sep	Parsifal	450	50.2%	19.8%	4.2%	–	–	–	–	4.3%	1.3%	3.5%	3.5%	3.5%
31 Aug–7 Sep	Episcenter	1521	46.7%	18.5%	11.6%	–	2.8%	–	–	–	1.2%	–	–	–
16–18 Aug	Episcenter	450	37.2%	23.1%	10.6%	3.3%	3.2%	1.6%	1.3%	–	–	–	–	–
26–28 Jul	Delo Stik	722	36.5%	20.6%	–	–	5.2%	2.7%	1.1%	–	–	–	–	–
25 Jun	Mediana	1241	51.5%	24.8%	–	–	3.9%	–	–	–	–	–	–	–
19–20 Apr	Delo	1140	44%	–	–	10%	12%	–	–	–	–	–	–	–

=== First round (28 September 2017 – 22 October 2017) ===
Date(s)	Pollster	Sample size									
Date(s)	Pollster	Sample size	Pahor Ind	Šarec LMŠ	Novak NSi	Tomc SDS	Brenčič SMC	Popovič SJN	Likovič ZaO	Šiško ZSi	Krause SLS
22 Oct	Episcenter	827	56.2%	22.5%	5.4%	10.5%	0.9%	0.8%	0.9%	1.9%	1.0%
22 Oct	Mediana	453	47.2%	20.4%	8.8%	15.2%	0.9%	2.6%	2.1%	2.2%	0.6%
Exit polls
14-16 Oct	Ninamedia	450	57.9%	22.7%	5.4%	8.1%	0.8%	2.4%	2.1%	0.1%	0.5%
5-13 Oct	Episcenter	1521	55.5%	21.2%	8.2%	7.8%	1.4%	1.2%	1.5%	2.5%	0.7%
5–7 Oct	Ninamedia	450	40.4%	14.9%	3.6%	5.5%	0.6%	1.0%	0.3%	1.3%	0.1%
2–6 Oct	Parsifal	722	31.5%	13.1%	3.0%	4.1%	1.1%	0.7%	0.3%	1.0%	0.1%
29 Sep–6 Oct	Episcenter	1241	31.2%	13.3%	4.9%	4.4%	1.2%	0.6%	0.5%	0.5%	0.2%
29 Sep–1 Oct	Valicon	1140	41.2%	22.0%	5.3%	5.4%	3.7%	3.6%	2.3%	1.7%	0.8%
28–29 Sep	Delo Stik	500	34.8%	22.7%	10.6%	9.9%	2%	1%	1%	1%	1%

=== Second round (23 October 2017 – 12 November 2017) ===
Date(s)	Pollster	Sample size			Undecided	Lead
Date(s)	Pollster	Sample size	Pahor Ind	Šarec LMŠ	Undecided	Lead
10 November 2017	Mediana	893	48.6%	44,5%	6,9%	4.1%
10 November 2017	Delo	1025	56.3%	43,7%	0%	12.6%
9 November 2017	Dnevnik		53%	47.0%	0%	6%
24-26 October 2017	Ninamedia	700	51.2%	34.0%	14.8%	17.2%

== Results ==
=== First round ===
The first round of the election was marked by the lowest voter turnout in a presidential election since 1992, at 44.2%. Despite most opinion polls predicting Pahor's victory in the first round (also, the exit polls predicted Pahor winning over 56% of the vote) Pahor only won 47.2%, resulting in the run-off against the second-placed Šarec. In his first reaction, Pahor called his result "encouraging given the general distrust in politics". Šarec stated he was happy with the result and with the fact that he made it to the run-off, he expressed hope that it will be possible to discuss topics that were not addressed in the first round campaign.

In the reactions to the results, media noticed that Pahor's failure to secure the victory in the first round was likely linked to the low turnout, the campaign was seen as "boring", foreign media also commented on Šarec's background as an actor. Commentators noticed that Tomc got almost twice as many votes as Novak, which some viewed as a victory of SDS over NSi. However, the candidates of the right-wing parties failed to more than a fifth of the vote, drawing comparison with Barbara Brezigar (SDS) who made it to the run-off in the 2002 election. SDS viewed the result of Tomc as a success, given the late start of the campaign and the fact that she won more vote than the opinion polls predicted, while Janez Janša stated that there are no major differences between Pahor and Šarec anyway. The bad result of the SMC candidate, Makovec Brenčič, was seen as a major blow to the largest party in the government and a warning before the 2018 general election. Šiško's result was seen as a surprise, as he ran as an anti-establishment candidate and even placed fourth in Maribor electoral unit. The result of Likovič that finished last was seen as an indication that there is little actual support for ZaO party outside the referendum campaigns.

=== Second round ===
Pahor won the second round with 53% of the vote. Voter turnout was even lower than in the first round, at 42.1%. Pahor won in six electoral units while Šarec won in Kranj and Ljubljana Bežigrad. Šarec quickly conceded and congratulated Pahor.

In his first reaction, Pahor acknowledged that many votes he received in the 2012 election as votes against the incumbent president Danilo Türk while this time people who voted for him did so in support of his activities. He pledged to be more vocal in the next term but will continue to avoid divisions between the left- and right-side parties. Pahor's head of campaign saw the high percent that Šarec won as a result of the election turning out to be a "referendum against Pahor".

Šarec expressed his satisfaction with the result, stating that it represented the desire of the people for a change. He further argued that the government should take note of the support demonstrated for a grassroots candidate representing the younger generation. After being asked whether he planned to continue to carry on the political momentum into the upcoming general election in 2018, he refused to make commitments, although he said that several people had already asked him to run.

Miro Cerar, the Prime Minister, whose SMC endorsed none of the candidates, and Milan Brglez, the Speaker of the National Assembly, both congratulated Pahor, as did the presidents of Austria Alexander Van der Bellen and Croatia Kolinda Grabar-Kitarović. Janez Janša of SDS also send congratulations but warned of the low voter turnout, which was "below the legitimate level".

Winner vote share in the first and second round by locality.

Candidate	Party	First round		Second round	
Candidate	Party	Votes	%	Votes	%
Borut Pahor	Independent (supported by Social Democrats)	355,117	47.21	378,307	53.09
Marjan Šarec	List of Marjan Šarec	186,235	24.76	334,239	46.91
Romana Tomc	Slovenian Democratic Party	102,925	13.68		
Ljudmila Novak	New Slovenia	54,437	7.24		
Andrej Šiško	United Slovenia Movement	16,636	2.21		
Boris Popovič	Slovenia Forever	13,559	1.80		
Maja Makovec Brenčič	Modern Centre Party	13,052	1.74		
Suzana Lara Krause	Slovenian People's Party	5,885	0.78		
Angelca Likovič	Voice for Children and Families	4,418	0.59		
Total		752,264	100.00	712,546	100.00
Valid votes		752,264	99.26	712,546	98.72
Invalid/blank votes		5,634	0.74	9,255	1.28
Total votes		757,898	100.00	721,801	100.00
Registered voters/turnout		1,713,762	44.22	1,713,473	42.13
Source: Volitve
