= 2007 Slovenian presidential election =

- 21 October 2007 (first round); 11 November 2007 (second round)
- Turnout: 57.64% (first round); 58.45% (second round)
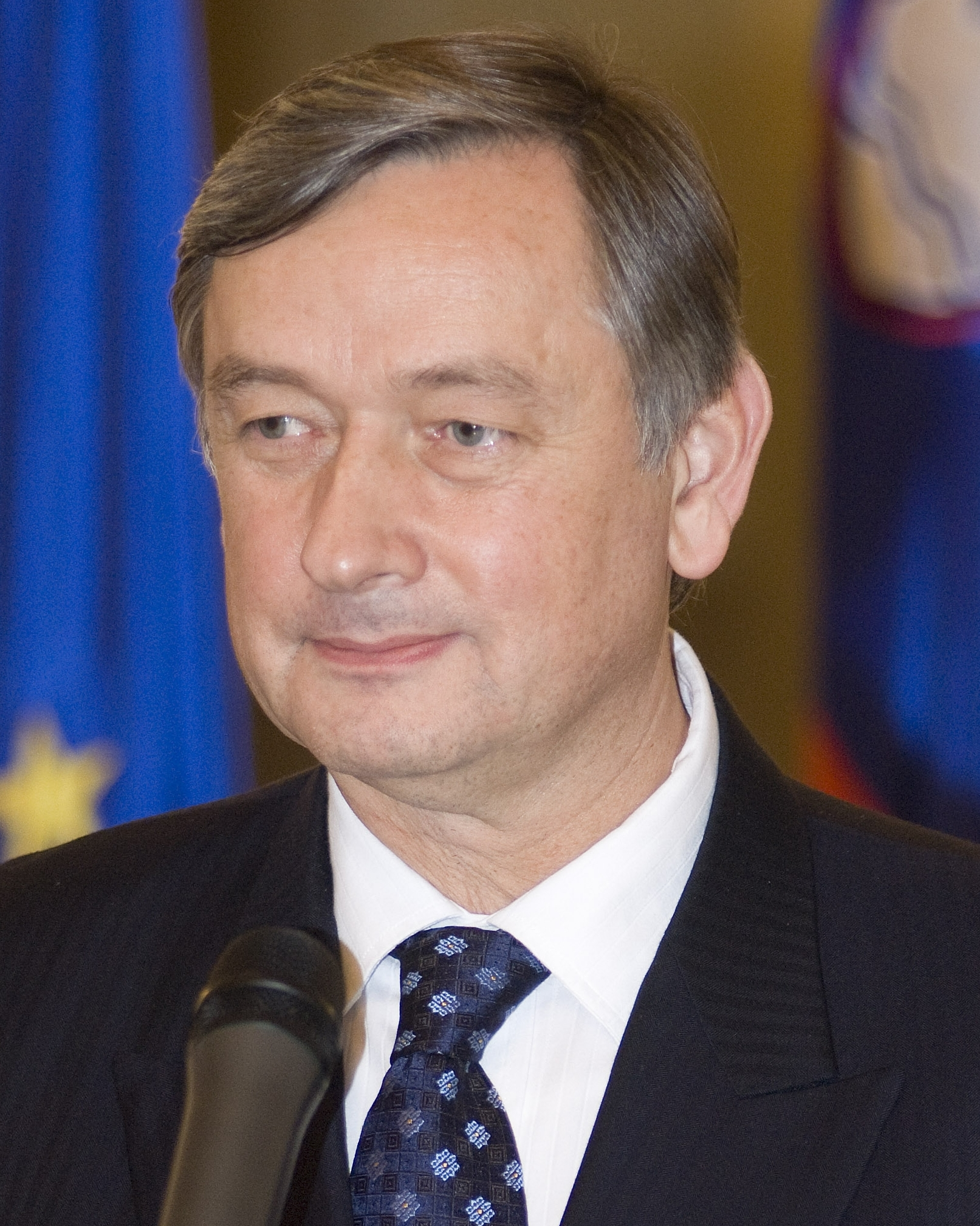

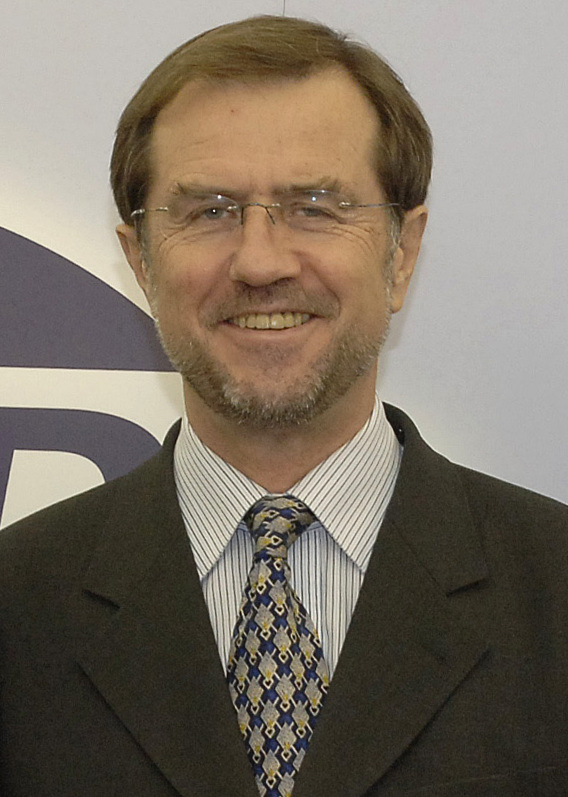
Candidate	Danilo Türk	Lojze Peterle
Party	Independent	Independent
Alliance	SD–DeSUS–Zares–AS	NSi–SDS–SLS
Popular vote	677,333	318,288
Percentage	68.03%	31.97%
- Türk: 50–60% 60–70% 70–80% 80–90% Peterle: 50–60%
President before election
Janez Drnovšek
Independent
Elected President
Danilo Türk
Independent

Presidential elections were held in Slovenia in October and November 2007 to elect the successor to Janez Drnovšek. France Cukjati, the President of the National Assembly, called the elections on 20 June 2007.

Seven candidates competed in the first round on 21 October 2007; three entered the race as independent candidates, the other four were supported by political parties. Several political events, as well as tension between the Government and the political opposition, overshadowed the campaign. The front runner Lojze Peterle, supported by the governing conservative coalition, won the first round with far fewer votes than predicted by opinion polls. In the second round, held on 11 November 2007, Peterle faced the runner-up, the left-wing candidate Danilo Türk. Türk won the second round in a landslide, with 68.03% of the vote.

In a referendum called by the National Council, and held on the same day as the second round, the electorate voted to overturn a law providing for the nationalization of citizens' share in the major national insurance company. Nearly three-quarters of the votes were cast against the law. After both election and referendum results were announced, Prime Minister Janez Janša announced that he might resign, following what he perceived to be a heavy defeat for the government. The government later won a vote of confidence in the National Assembly.

== Background ==
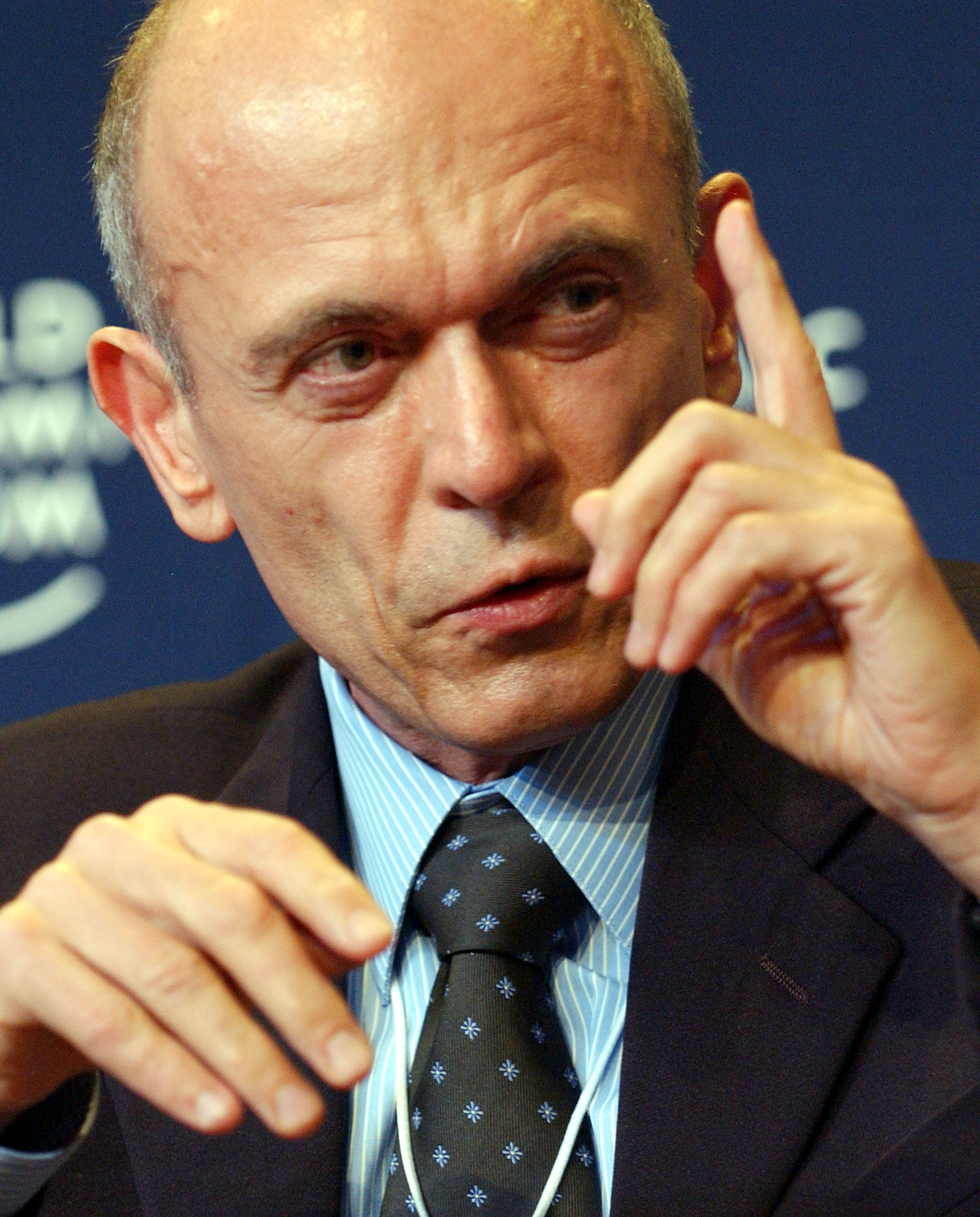
Janez Drnovšek, the incumbent president, announced he would not run for president again

The role of the president of Slovenia is mainly ceremonial. One of the president's duties is to nominate the Prime Minister, after consulting with political groups represented in the National Assembly. The president also proposes candidates for various state offices, as well as judicial appointments to the Constitutional and Supreme Court, which must be approved by the National Assembly. In rare circumstances, the president possesses the power to pass laws and dissolve the National Assembly. The President is also the Supreme Commander of the Armed Forces. Unlike the majority of the government, which is chosen by the National Assembly and elected through proportional representation, the president is directly elected by the majority of Slovenian voters.

The previous presidential election in 2002 brought major changes to Slovenian politics. The former president Milan Kučan, in office since the first free elections held in the Republic of Slovenia in April 1990 (before the country's independence from Yugoslavia), was forbidden by the constitution from running for president again, and announced his retirement from active politics. Prime Minister Janez Drnovšek of the Liberal Democracy of Slovenia stood for the office, comfortably winning the runoff against conservative candidate Barbara Brezigar.

The 2004 legislative election brought further changes and a political swing to the right. Janez Janša, the leader of a right-wing coalition, formed the new government. In Slovenia, this was the first time after 1992 that the President and the Prime Minister had represented opposing political factions for more than a few months. Between 2002 and 2004, the relationship between President Drnovšek and Janez Janša, then leader of the opposition, were considered more than good and in the first year of cohabitation, no major problems arose.

At the beginning of his term, Drnovšek, who was ill with cancer, stayed out of public view. When he reemerged in late 2005 he had changed his lifestyle: he became a vegan, moved out of the capital into the countryside, and withdrew from party politics completely, ending his already frozen membership in the Liberal Democracy. Drnovšek's new approach to politics prompted one political commentator to nickname him "Slovenia's Gandhi".

The relationship between Drnovšek and the government quickly became tense. Disagreements began with Drnovšek's initiatives in foreign politics, aimed at solving major foreign conflicts, including those in Darfur and Kosovo. Initially, these initiatives were not openly opposed by the Prime Minister, but were criticized by the foreign minister Dimitrij Rupel, Drnovšek's former collaborator and close political ally until 2004. The disagreements moved to issues of domestic politics in October 2006, when Drnovšek publicly criticised the treatment of the Romani family Strojans. The neighborhood had forced the Strojans to relocate, which in turn subjected them to police supervision and limitation of movement. The disagreements however escalated when the parliamentary majority repeatedly rejected President's candidates for the Governor of the Bank of Slovenia, beginning with the rejection of incumbent Mitja Gaspari. The friction continued over the appointment of other state official nominees, including Constitutional Court judges. Although the President's political support suffered after his personal transformation, the polls nevertheless showed public backing of the President against an increasingly unpopular Government. The tension reached its height in May 2007, when the newly appointed director of the Slovenian Secret Service Matjaž Šinkovec unclassified several documents from the period before 2004, revealing, among other, that Drnovšek had used secret funds for personal purposes between 2002 and 2004. The President reacted with a harsh criticism of the government's policies, accusing the ruling coalition of abusing its power for personal delegitimation and labeled the Prime Minister as "the leader of the negative guys". After years of speculation about his health and intentions, Janez Drnovšek announced in February 2007 that he would not run for president again.

== Candidates ==
=== Requirements for candidacy ===
Under Slovenian Election Law, candidates for president require support of either:

- 10 members of the National Assembly,
- one or more political parties and either 3 members of the National Assembly or 3,000 voters,
- or 5,000 voters.

Each political party can support only one candidate. In the election, the president is elected with a majority of the vote. If no candidate receives more than half of votes, the top two candidates meet in the second round of election.

=== Leading candidates ===
The first official candidate was Lojze Peterle, a conservative member of the European Parliament and first democratically elected Prime Minister of Slovenia (1990–1992), who announced his candidacy in November 2006. He was endorsed by the three government center-right parties, New Slovenia (NSi), Slovenian Democratic Party (SDS), and Slovenian People's Party (SLS).

Drnovšek's announcement that he would not run for president again led to expectations that the Social Democrats (SD) would nominate their leader Borut Pahor and indeed Pahor confirmed that he was ready to run for the office. The Social Democrats had become the most popular party in opinion polls and were considered the likely winners at the next general election in 2008; opinion polls indicated that Pahor would easily win the presidential election. However, after months of mixed signals, Pahor finally announced that he would instead concentrate on the general election and would not run for the mostly ceremonial office of the president.

The Social Democrats then nominated Danilo Türk, a former Slovenian ambassador and high official in the United Nations, who at the time was a professor at the University of Ljubljana's Faculty of Law. Türk's candidacy was also endorsed by Zares and the pensioners' party DeSUS. Türk also gained support from Active Slovenia (AS) and the Party of Ecological Movements (SEG), two parties not represented in the National Assembly.

Liberal Democracy of Slovenia (LDS), which had earlier discussed the candidacy with Danilo Türk, subsequently nominated Mitja Gaspari, the former Governor of the Bank of Slovenia. Gaspari had earlier had discussions with the Social Democrats about the candidacy.

The Slovenian National Party (SNS) nominated its leader, Zmago Jelinčič. Jelinčič had already run for the office at the 2002 election, finishing third with 8.51% of the votes.

Peterle, Türk and Gaspari all decided to enter the election as independent candidates and all managed to collect enough nominating votes with Peterle reaching the required number within the first 4 hours of the nominating process. Jelinčič was supported by his fellow party members. Early polls indicated that Peterle, who had been campaigning for months and had cultivated the image of a "man of the people", would win the election in a runoff against Türk or possibly Gaspari.

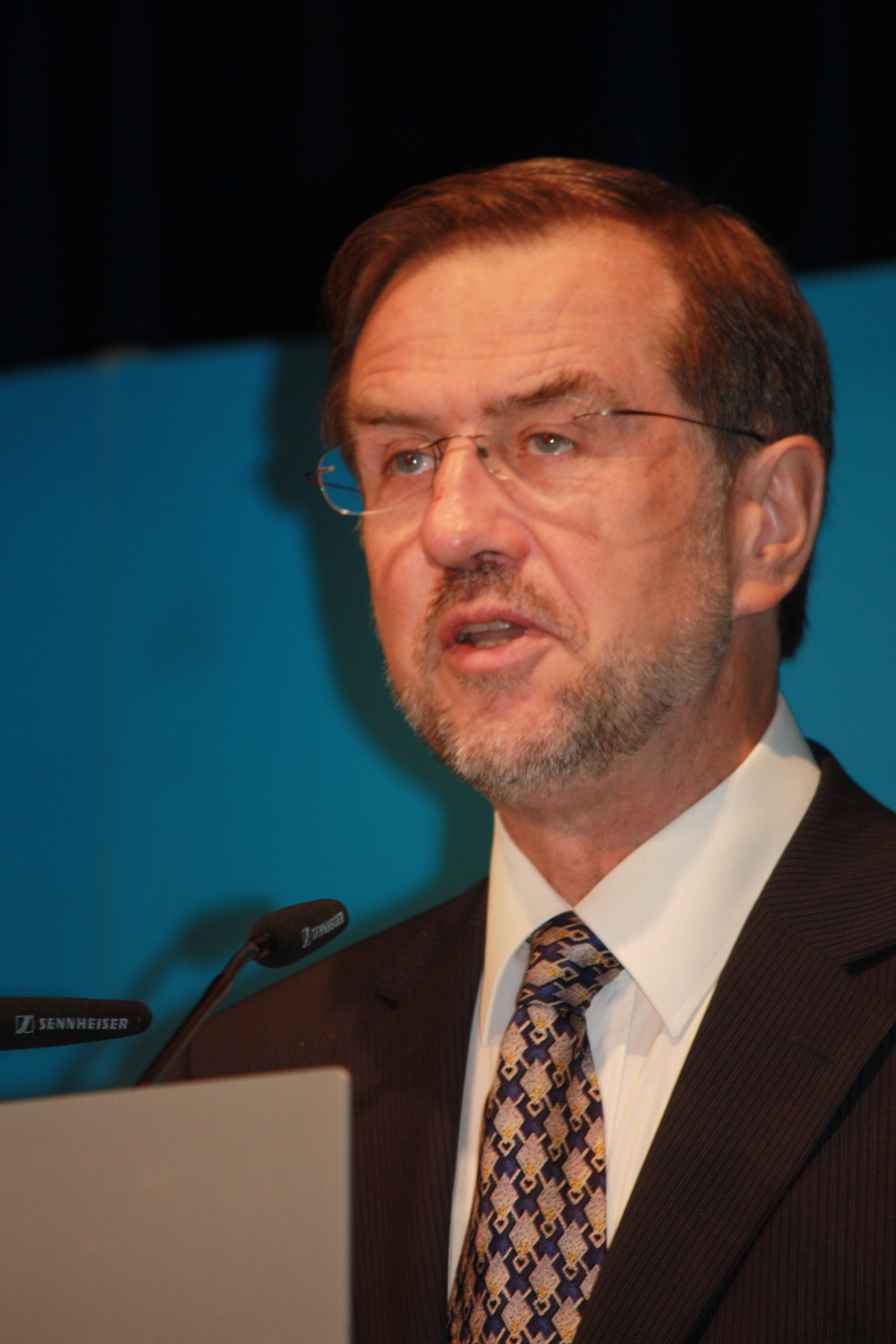
Lojze Peterle, independent candidate, supported by NSi, SDS and SLS

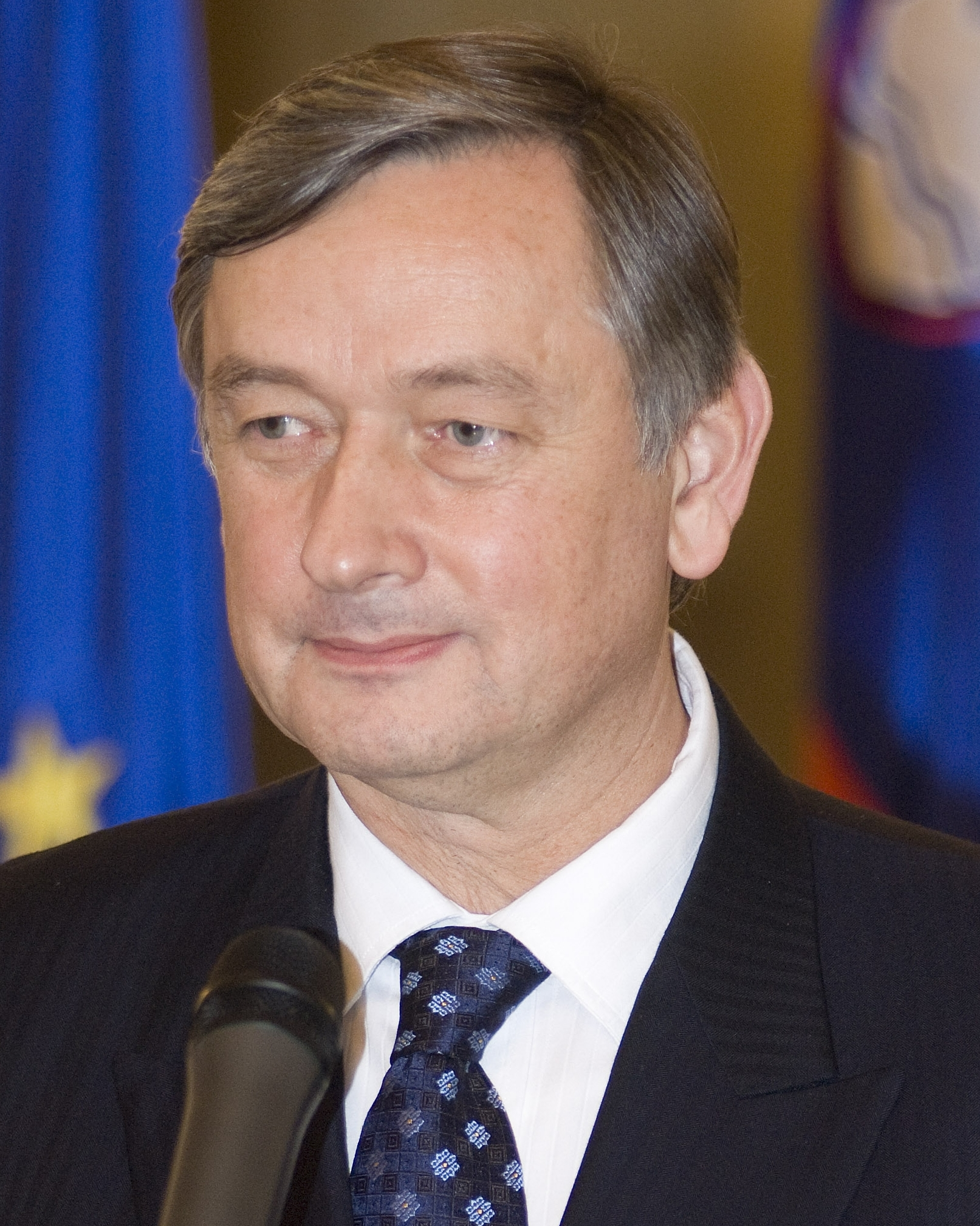
Danilo Türk, independent candidate, supported by SD, DeSUS, Zares, AS and SEG

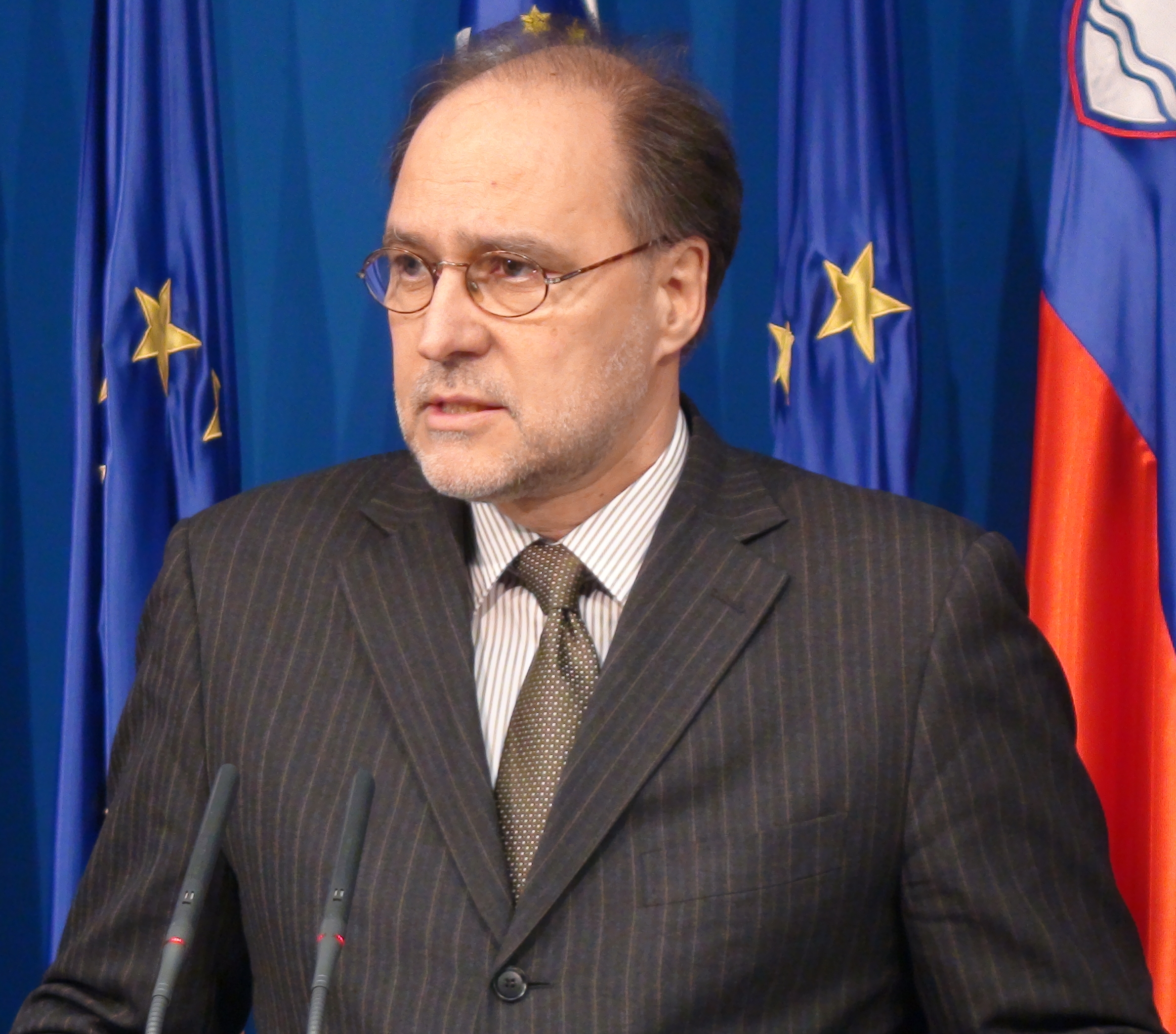
Mitja Gaspari, independent candidate, supported by LDS

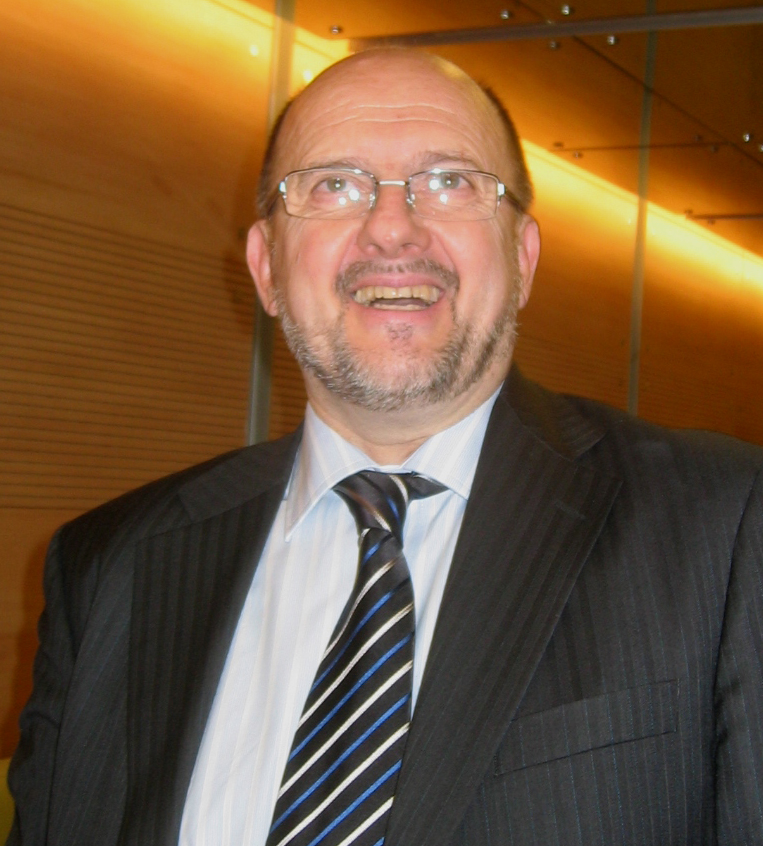
Zmago Jelinčič, candidate of SNS

=== Other candidates ===
Other candidates, none of whom were expected to win a significant share of votes, were Darko Krajnc of the formerly parliamentarian Youth Party of Slovenia, the disabled rights activist Elena Pečarič, and Monika Piberl, supported by the Women's Voice of Slovenia party. Pečarič was supported by non-aligned Majda Širca, independent Slavko Gaber and Roberto Battelli, representative of the Italian minority in Slovenia. Krajnc and Piberl were supported by non-parliamentary political parties so they only needed to collect 3,000 support votes.

Several other candidates publicly announced their intention to run for the office. Jože Andrejaš, Jožef Horvat, Matej Sedmak, Marjan Beranič, Marko Kožar and Pavel Premrl failed to gather sufficient public support or later decided to withdraw from the race. Artur Štern, after leading a spoof campaign, announced that he was in fact performing a hidden camera experiment. The footage was used by Franci Kek and Vojko Anzeljc in a film Gola resnica, airing in early 2009 and addressing objectivity of media, problems with election legislation and reactions from Slovenes.

== First round campaign ==
The official election campaign began in late September 2007. The campaigns of the three front runners were based mostly on the personal appeal of the candidates, with few concrete statements about political issues. Zmago Jelinčič led an aggressive campaign, focusing on denouncing the three front runners, the Government, the ethnic and religious minorities, the Roman Catholic Church, and demanding an aggressive policy towards neighbouring Croatia.

The candidates appeared in televised debates during which they discussed various topics. One of them were the rules governing the voting of non-resident nationals, which had been changed by the National Electoral Commission during the campaign. Before the campaign, non-resident nationals who wanted to cast their votes as absentee ballots had been obliged to request voting materials, but the commission had introduced a new system in which such materials were sent to all non-residents entered in the electoral register, whether they had asked for them or not. Opposition parties, representing the left wing of Slovenian politics, disliked this move because the record of voters' addresses was not always reliable, and also because the rules had been changed after the campaign had already started. They particularly opposed the change because voters from abroad seemed to favor right-wing parties, so that in the event of a very close ballot, votes from non-residents could tip the scale in favour of Peterle.

Other events overshadowed the campaign. During the summer, journalists Matej Šurc and Blaž Zgaga launched a Petition Against Censorship and Political Pressures on Journalists in Slovenia, alleging government interference with journalism. The petition was signed by hundreds of Slovenian journalists from the mainstream media. It was sent to the heads of state, prime ministers and parliamentary speakers of all EU member states during the campaign. Following the petition, the International Press Institute (IPI) sent a fact-finding mission to Ljubljana in November, to discuss the claims made in the petition with members of the Slovenian media. The contents of the mission's report remain confidential, but IPI called for the establishment of an independent commission to investigate the claims further.

Another event which attracted much debate was the Supreme Court's annulment of the 1946 war crimes conviction of Gregorij Rožman. Rožman was the Catholic bishop of Ljubljana who had been found guilty of war crimes and treason during World War II as a result of his collaboration with Italian and German occupation forces. Several attempts during the 1990s to review the trial had failed. This had led to Janša's government changing the law, enabling the religious communities to request a review of trials of their deceased members, something which had previously been reserved only for close relatives. After the Archdiocese of Ljubljana initiated the review, the Supreme Court annulled the 1946 trial on procedural grounds, effectively rehabilitating Rožman, a decision that caused much controversy. This proved harmful for Peterle's campaign, as he was closely associated with the Catholic Church. (Note: One of the controversies during the short-lived centre-right government of Andrej Bajuk's government was the participation of several leading members of the coalition in a ceremony in June 2000. The ceremony honored the members of the Slovene Home Guard, a collaborationist militia, killed by the Communist regime in June 1945. At the ceremony, anthems of the Slovene Home Guard were sung. Among those attending were Prime Minister Andrej Bajuk, chairman of the National Assembly Janez Podobnik, Defense Minister Janez Janša, Foreign Minister Lojze Peterle, and Archbishop of Ljubljana Franc Rode.) When asked about the Rožman case in a TV debate, Peterle confined himself to remarking that he was a supporter of the rule of law, that the war had divided the nation and that Rožman had played some part in that.

The last opinion polls published before the first round predicted a runoff between Peterle, who would win 40%, and either Türk or Gaspari. The latter were each predicted to receive 20–25%; most polls predicted a substantially larger share for Türk.

== First round result and reactions ==
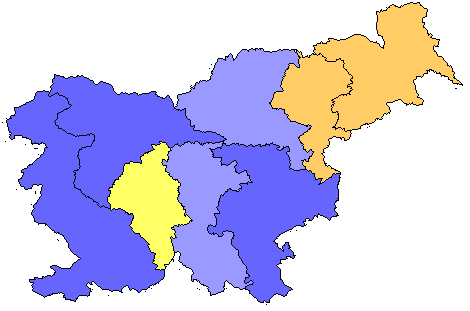
First round winners by electoral unit Lojze Peterle: 20–30% (pastel blue), 30–40% (dark blue) Mitja Gaspari: 20–30% (yellow) Zmago Jelinčič: 20–30% (orange)

The first round, held on 21 October, brought unexpected results. Contrary to predictions, Peterle won less than 29% of the vote, with Türk and Gaspari finishing a close second and third, respectively. Jelinčič, who according to opinion polls was expected to win around 12% of the vote, actually won almost 20%, finishing first in two of Slovenia's eight electoral units. Prime Minister Janez Janša blamed Peterle's poor showing on certain topics that were brought up during the campaign by "hidden centres of power". This was a reference to the journalists' petition, the timing of the Supreme Court's decision on the Rožman case and misinterpretation of Janša's and Minister of Economy Andrej Vizjak's remarks on reasons for Slovenia's high inflation in 2007.

== Runoff campaign ==
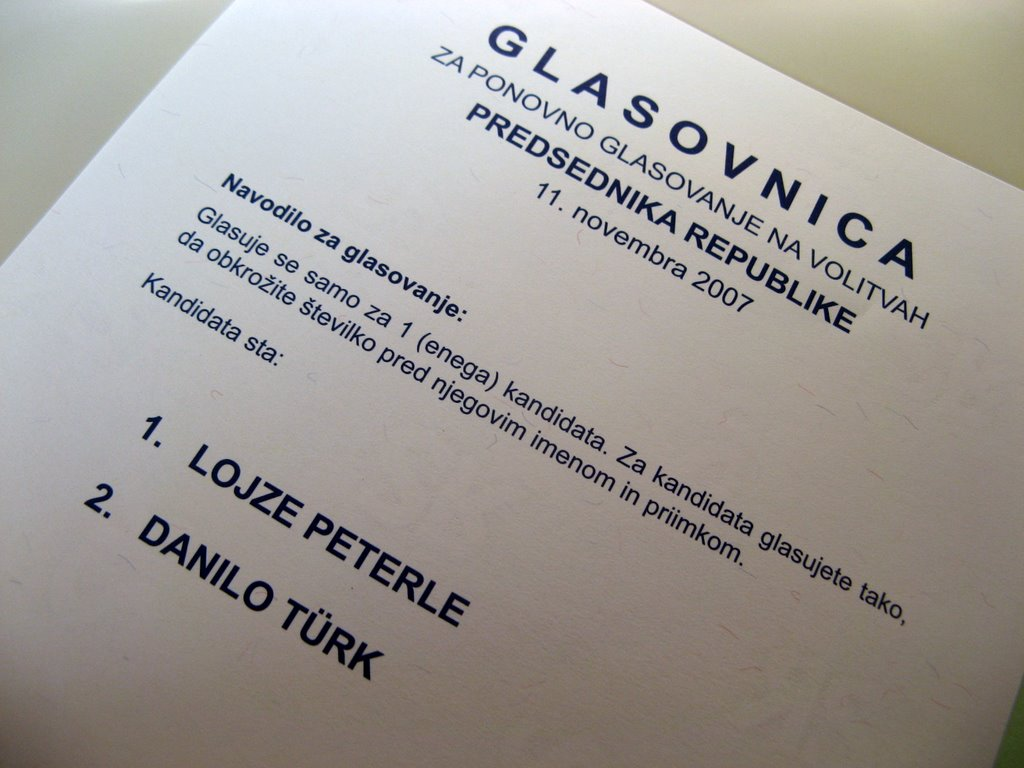
Runoff election ballot

Following the unexpected results of the first round, new opinion polls showed major changes, giving Türk a large lead over Peterle. Liberal Democracy of Slovenia, which supported Gaspari in the first round, announced it would support Türk in the second.

After the surprise gains of the flamboyant Jelinčič in the first round, the campaigns of both candidates opted for more concrete political statements in public campaigning and debates. Peterle replaced the head of his campaign, and concentrated on questioning Türk's role in the 1991 secession from Yugoslavia. Peterle alleged that at the time when he, as Prime Minister, struggled for Slovenia's independence, Türk continued to act as an official representative of Yugoslavia in international institutions. The campaign was backed by the Prime Minister Janša and the Foreign Minister Dimitrij Rupel who went so far as to confirm Peterle's claims on the Foreign Ministry's official website. Türk denied the allegations, pointing to his opinion piece in the International Herald Tribune advocating international recognition of Slovenia, and the fact that it was Rupel himself who in 1992 appointed Türk as the Ambassador to the UN and praised him for his service to the country. Peterle's new strategy appeared to backfire, and the polls before the runoff predicted that Türk would win between 63% and over 70% of the vote.

== Runoff result and reactions ==
The runoff was held on 11 November 2007. Exit poll results published at the closing of the vote predicted a victory for Türk, with 69% of the vote. "I'm very happy with the results as they appear now. I want to be a president who is uniting people. I believe that conditions here are such that people have a strong desire for something new," Türk told reporters.

Peterle conceded immediately. In his first statements, Peterle said his defeat was a vote against the ruling Janša government, and that he had expected a better result. He added, however, that he would have regretted it if he had not decided to run for the office. By midnight, unofficial results from the Electoral Commission gave Türk a lead of 68% vs. 32%. Türk won in all eight electoral units, with Peterle narrowly winning in only four of 88 electoral districts. Together with the second round of the election, a referendum on a law providing for the nationalization of citizens' share in the major national insurance company was held as well. Nearly three-quarters of the votes were cast against the law.

The ballots from abroad that were considered potentially contentious before the election proved to have very little effect on the result. While Peterle received more votes from abroad than Türk, both the total number of votes and the difference was smaller than expected (3693 for Peterle and 3040 for Türk).

Two days after the election, Prime Minister Janša announced that he might resign following what was perceived as a heavy defeat for the Government: "We will analyze the situation further, but all possibilities are open, including a resignation of the Government." He said that "it is particularly worrying that a lot of energy was invested in blackening the Government abroad," claiming his opponents portrayed Slovenia "as Belarus" or some other authoritarian country. The opposition parties said that talk of resignation just weeks before Slovenia took over European Union presidency was irresponsible and unwise, but the Prime Minister called a vote of confidence for 19 November 2007. The Government won the confidence vote, but support for the ruling SDS subsequently reached an all-time low, with only 18% of voters intending to vote for it in the fall 2008 election.

Reactions to Türk's victory from international media were positive. The Swiss newspaper Neue Zürcher Zeitung described him as "more or less the ideal man for the job". The media focused on the landslide victory that was perceived to be a severe defeat for Janša's centre-right coalition. Since the EU presidency was closing, Türk's diplomatic background was put forward. "Slovenia is your solid, faithful and credible partner. Rely on us, and we'll be a good president of the European Union next year," Türk said. Türk was also expected to maintain Slovenia's alliance with the United States even though he was highly critical of the war in Iraq, as Al Jazeera reported.

On 22 December, Türk was sworn in as the President of the Republic of Slovenia. In his inaugural address, he thanked his predecessor Janez Drnovšek for his contribution to success and respect of Slovenia. Later, he also stated that he would work closely with Janša's government during Slovenia's six-month EU presidency.

Janez Drnovšek would die a little over three months after the election from kidney cancer on 23 February 2008, at the age of 57.

== Results ==
Candidate	Party	First round		Second round	
Candidate	Party	Votes	%	Votes	%
Lojze Peterle	Independent (NSi–SDS–SLS)	283,412	28.73	318,288	31.97
Danilo Türk	Independent (SD–DeSUS–Z–AS)	241,349	24.47	677,333	68.03
Mitja Gaspari	Independent (LDS)	237,632	24.09		
Zmago Jelinčič Plemeniti	Slovenian National Party	188,951	19.16		
Darko Krajnc	Youth Party of Slovenia	21,526	2.18		
Elena Pečarič	Independent	8,830	0.90		
Monika Piberl	Women's Voice of Slovenia	4,729	0.48		
Total		986,429	100.00	995,621	100.00
Valid votes		986,429	99.47	995,621	99.03
Invalid/blank votes		5,279	0.53	9,738	0.97
Total votes		991,708	100.00	1,005,359	100.00
Registered voters/turnout		1,720,481	57.64	1,720,174	58.45
Source: DVK
