= 2000 Monte Carlo Rally =

1st round of the 2000 World Rally Championship

2000 Monte Carlo Rally 68th Rallye Automobile de Monte-Carlo
Round 1 of the 2000 World Rally Championship season
Next event →
- Host country: Monaco
- Rally base: Monaco
- Dates run: January 20, 2000 – January 22, 2000
- Stages: 15 (412.81 km; 256.51 miles)
- Stage surface: Asphalt/snow
- Overall distance: 1,434.85 km (891.57 miles)

Statistics
- Crews: 92 at start, 59 at finish

Overall results
- Overall winner: (Finland) Tommi Mäkinen (Finland) Risto Mannisenmäki (Japan) Marlboro Mitsubishi Ralliart; Mitsubishi Lancer Evo VI

The 2000 Monte Carlo Rally (formally the 68th Rallye Automobile de Monte-Carlo) was the first round of the 2000 World Rally Championship. The race was held over three days between 20 January and 22 January 2000, and was won by Mitsubishi's Tommi Mäkinen, his 20th win in the World Rally Championship.

== Background ==
=== Entry list ===
No.	Driver	Co-Driver	Entrant	Car	Tyre
World Rally Championship manufacturer entries
1	(Finland) Tommi Mäkinen	(Finland) Risto Mannisenmäki	(Japan) Marlboro Mitsubishi Ralliart	Mitsubishi Lancer Evo VI	M
2	(Belgium) Freddy Loix	(Belgium) Sven Smeets	(Japan) Marlboro Mitsubishi Ralliart	Mitsubishi Carisma GT Evo VI	M
3	(United Kingdom) Richard Burns	(United Kingdom) Robert Reid	(Japan) Subaru World Rally Team	Subaru Impreza S5 WRC '99	P
4	(Finland) Juha Kankkunen	(Finland) Juha Repo	(Japan) Subaru World Rally Team	Subaru Impreza S5 WRC '99	P
5	(United Kingdom) Colin McRae	(United Kingdom) Nicky Grist	(United Kingdom) Ford Motor Co. Ltd.	Ford Focus RS WRC '00	M
6	(Spain) Carlos Sainz	(Spain) Luis Moya	(United Kingdom) Ford Motor Co. Ltd.	Ford Focus RS WRC '00	M
7	(France) Didier Auriol	(France) Denis Giraudet	(Spain) SEAT Sport	SEAT Córdoba WRC Evo2	P
8	(Finland) Toni Gardemeister	(Finland) Paavo Lukander	(Spain) SEAT Sport	SEAT Córdoba WRC Evo2	P
9	(France) François Delecour	(France) Daniel Grataloup	(France) Peugeot Esso	Peugeot 206 WRC	M
10	(France) Gilles Panizzi	(France) Hervé Panizzi	(France) Peugeot Esso	Peugeot 206 WRC	M
11	(Germany) Armin Schwarz	(Germany) Manfred Hiemer	(Czech Republic) Škoda Motorsport	Škoda Octavia WRC	M
12	(Spain) Luis Climent Asensio	(Spain) Álex Romaní	(Czech Republic) Škoda Motorsport	Škoda Octavia WRC	M
World Rally Championship entries
17	(Finland) Marcus Grönholm	(Finland) Timo Rautiainen	(France) Peugeot Esso	Peugeot 206 WRC	M
18	(Belgium) Bruno Thiry	(Belgium) Stéphane Prévot	(Italy) H.F. Grifone SRL	Toyota Corolla WRC	M
19	(Denmark) Henrik Lundgaard	(Denmark) Jens-Christian Anker	(Denmark) Henrik Lundgaard	Toyota Corolla WRC	M
20	(Switzerland) Olivier Burri	(Switzerland) Christophe Hofmann	(Switzerland) Olivier Burri	Toyota Corolla WRC	M
27	(Italy) Alessandro Ghezzi	(Italy) Primo Zonca	(Italy) Alessandro Ghezzi	Toyota Corolla WRC	M
28	(Italy) Pier Lorenzo Zanchi	(Italy) Dario D'Esposito	(Italy) Pier Lorenzo Zanchi	Toyota Corolla WRC	M
29	(France) Christophe Arnaud	(France) Stéphane Arnaud	(France) Christophe Arnaud	Subaru Impreza 555	M
30	(Italy) Italo Ferrara	(Italy) Gabriele Bobbio	(Italy) Italo Ferrara	Lancia Delta HF Integrale	—N/a
31	(United Kingdom) Nigel Heath	(United Kingdom) Chris Patterson	(United Kingdom) Nigel Heath	Subaru Impreza 555	P
32	(France) Pierre Carestia	(France) Christophe Gianti	(France) Pierre Carestia	Subaru Impreza S5 WRC '99	—N/a
33	(Italy) Roberto Di Giuseppe	(Italy) Francesco Carugno	(Italy) Roberto Di Giuseppe	Lancia Delta HF Integrale	—N/a
34	(Germany) Georg Ruhl	(Germany) Ludwig Rühl jr.	(Germany) Georg Ruhl	Mitsubishi Lancer Evo	—N/a
Group N Cup entries
16	(Uruguay) Gustavo Trelles	(Argentina) Jorge Del Buono	(Uruguay) Gustavo Trelles	Mitsubishi Lancer Evo V	—N/a
21	(Austria) Manfred Stohl	(Austria) Peter Müller	(Austria) Manfred Stohl	Mitsubishi Lancer Evo VI	P
22	(Germany) Uwe Nittel	(Germany) Detlef Ruf	(Germany) Uwe Nittel	Mitsubishi Carisma GT Evo VI	M
23	(Slovenia) Boris Popovič	(Italy) Antonio Morassi	(Slovenia) Boris Popovič	Mitsubishi Lancer Evo VI	—N/a
24	(Italy) Andrea Maselli	(Italy) Nicola Arena	(Italy) Andrea Maselli	Mitsubishi Lancer Evo V	P
25	(Italy) Gianluigi Galli	(Italy) Guido D'Amore	(Italy) Vieffe Corse SRL	Mitsubishi Lancer Evo V	—N/a
26	(Belgium) Pieter Tsjoen	(Belgium) Steven Vergalle	(France) Team Gamma	Mitsubishi Lancer Evo VI	—N/a
51	(Switzerland) Olivier Gillet	(Monaco) Freddy Delorme	(Switzerland) Olivier Gillet	Mitsubishi Lancer Evo VI	—N/a
52	(France) Philippe Rognoni	(France) Etienne Patrone	(France) Philippe Rognoni	Mitsubishi Lancer Evo VI	—N/a
53	(France) Nicolas Latil	(France) Laurent Nicolas	(France) Nicolas Latil	Mitsubishi Lancer Evo V	—N/a
54	(France) Claude Carret	(France) Julian Carret	(France) Claude Carret	Mitsubishi Lancer Evo VI	M
55	(Germany) Hermann Gassner Sr.	(Germany) Siegfried Schrankl	(Germany) Hermann Gassner Sr.	Proton Pert Evo V	—N/a
56	(France) Frédéric Schmit	(France) Christophe Schmit	(France) Frédéric Schmit	Mitsubishi Lancer Evo V	—N/a
57	(Italy) Marco Menegatto	(Italy) Roberto Vittori	(Italy) Marco Menegatto	Mitsubishi Lancer Evo VI	—N/a
58	(Italy) Marta Candian	(Italy) Mara Biotti	(Italy) Marta Candian	Mitsubishi Lancer Evo V	—N/a
59	(Finland) Raimo Hämeenniemi	(Finland) Jaakko Pikkarainen	(Finland) Raimo Hämeenniemi	Mitsubishi Lancer Evo III	—N/a
60	(France) Richard Bourcier	(France) Jean-Marc Ducousso	(France) Richard Bourcier	Subaru Impreza GT Turbo	—N/a
61	(France) David Truphemus	(France) Pascal Saivre	(France) David Truphemus	Ford Escort RS Cosworth	—N/a
62	(Belgium) Bob Colsoul	(Belgium) Tom Colsoul	(Belgium) Bob Colsoul	Mitsubishi Lancer Evo IV	—N/a
63	(Italy) Riccardo Garosci	(France) Jean-Charles Descamps	(Italy) Riccardo Garosci	Mitsubishi Lancer Evo VI	—N/a
64	(Germany) Michael Stoschek	(Germany) Klaus Wagner	(Germany) Michael Stoschek	Mitsubishi Lancer Evo V	—N/a
65	(Germany) Uwe Forkert	(Germany) Fred Winklhofer	(Germany) FWU Premium Rally Team	Mitsubishi Lancer Evo IV	—N/a
66	(Czech Republic) Radek Švec	(Czech Republic) Hana Komarovová	(Czech Republic) Radek Švec	Mitsubishi Lancer Evo III	—N/a
67	(France) Serge Amorotti	(France) Hervé Amorotti	(France) Serge Amorotti	Ford Escort RS Cosworth	—N/a
68	(France) Gérard Picot	(France) Nadine Gadet	(France) Gérard Picot	Subaru Impreza GT Turbo	—N/a
69	(Switzerland) François Bonny	(Switzerland) Christiane Bonny	(Switzerland) Lugano Racing Team	Ford Escort RS Cosworth	—N/a
70	(France) Mickaël De Castelli	(France) Michel Robinet	(France) Mickaël De Castelli	Subaru Impreza GT Turbo	—N/a
71	(France) Lilian Polge	(France) Marie-Noëlle Polge	(France) Lilian Polge	Subaru Impreza GT Turbo	—N/a
72	(France) Christian Caffardo	(France) Marielle Vescovi	(France) Christian Caffardo	Subaru Impreza GT Turbo	—N/a
73	(France) Frédéric Ruelle-Jourdain	(France) Pascal Serre	(France) Frédéric Ruelle-Jourdain	Mazda 323 GT-R	—N/a
74	(Germany) Jürgen Barth	(France) Jean-Claude Perramond	(Germany) Jürgen Barth	Seat Ibiza TDI	—N/a
75	(Italy) Gabriele Cadringher	(Italy) Gianfranco Serembre	(Italy) Gabriele Cadringher	Seat Ibiza TDI	—N/a
76	(France) Brice Tirabassi	(France) Sabrina De Castelli	(France) Brice Tirabassi	Peugeot 306 Rallye	—N/a
77	(Germany) Horst Rotter	(Germany) Volker Schmidt	(Germany) Horst Rotter	Opel Astra GSi 16V	—N/a
78	(France) Serge Guiramand	(France) Jérôme Favier	(France) Serge Guiramand	Renault Clio Williams	—N/a
79	(France) Pascal Imbert	(France) Jean-Claude Imbert	(France) Pascal Imbert	Renault Clio Williams	—N/a
80	(France) Stéphane Cornu	(France) Benoît Legras	(France) Stéphane Cornu	Peugeot 205 GTI 1.9	—N/a
81	(Monaco) Marc Dessi	(Monaco) Vanessa Dessi	(Monaco) Marc Dessi	Peugeot 205 GTI 1.9	—N/a
82	(France) Christian Grillerer	(France) Stephane Cambou	(France) Christian Grillerer	Honda Integra Type-R	—N/a
83	(France) Bruno Zonta	(France) Roger Lassalle	(France) Bruno Zonta	Renault Clio Williams	—N/a
84	(France) Miguel Baudoin	(France) Eric Mattei	(France) Miguel Baudoin	Renault Clio Williams	—N/a
85	(France) Jean-Pierre Roche	(France) Christophe Preve	(France) Jean-Pierre Roche	Renault Clio 16S	—N/a
86	(France) Claude Bensimon	(France) Emmanuel Bracconi	(France) Claude Bensimon	Renault Clio Williams	—N/a
87	(France) Michel Giry	(France) Marion Giry	(France) Michel Giry	Peugeot 306 S16	—N/a
88	(France) Michel Bour	(France) Denise Bour	(France) Michel Bour	Citroën Saxo VTS	—N/a
89	(France) Pascal Allemand	(France) Florent Allemand	(France) Pascal Allemand	Peugeot 106 Rallye	—N/a
90	(France) Jean-Noël Dupouy	(France) Olivier Bourgier	(France) Jean-Noël Dupouy	Peugeot 106 Rallye	—N/a
91	(Belgium) Johan Bastiaens	(Belgium) Marc Ceyssens	(Belgium) Johan Bastiaens	Honda Civic VTi	—N/a
92	(France) Roger Grimaud	(France) Jean-Christian Grimaud	(France) Roger Grimaud	Honda Civic VTi (EG6)	—N/a
93	(France) Paul-Louis Ristori	(France) Lucie Paoli	(France) Paul-Louis Ristori	Peugeot 106 Rallye	—N/a
94	(France) Jean-Pierre Manavella	(France) Jean-Michel Mercier	(France) Jean-Pierre Manavella	Škoda Felicia	—N/a
95	(France) Thierry Chabanne	(France) Isabelle Bernard	(France) Thierry Chabanne	Peugeot 106 XSI	—N/a

=== Itinerary ===
All dates and times are CET (UTC+1).

Date	Time	No.	Stage name	Distance
Leg 1 — 112.83 km
20 January	12:03	SS1	Tourette du Château — Saint Antonin	24.81 km
20 January	12:36	SS2	Saint Pierre — Entrevaux	30.63 km
20 January	14:40	SS3	Norante — Etablissement Thermal	19.75 km
20 January	17:28	SS4	Selonnet — Bréziers 1	17.94 km
20 January	18:01	SS5	Rochebrune — Urtis 1	19.70 km
Leg 2 — 162.35 km
21 January	08:38	SS6	L'Epine — Rosans	31.40 km
21 January	11:11	SS7	Ruissas — Eygalayes	27.70 km
21 January	13:29	SS8	Plan de Vitrolles — Faye	48.55 km
21 January	16:28	SS9	Prunières — Embrun	34.12 km
21 January	17:31	SS10	Saint Clément — Saint Saveur	20.58 km
Leg 3 — 137.63 km
22 January	07:12	SS11	Selonnet — Bréziers 2	17.94 km
22 January	07:45	SS12	Rochebrune — Urtis 2	19.70 km
22 January	09:25	SS13	Sisteron — Thoard	36.94 km
22 January	12:40	SS14	Saint Auban — Bif. D10/D17	29.17 km
22 January	15:56	SS15	Sospel — La Bollène Vésubie	33.88 km

== Results ==
=== Overall ===
Pos.	No.	Driver	Co-driver	Team	Car	Time	Difference	Points
1	1	(Finland) Tommi Mäkinen	(Finland) Risto Mannisenmäki	(Japan) Marlboro Mitsubishi Ralliart	Mitsubishi Lancer Evo VI	4:23:35.8		10
2	6	(Spain) Carlos Sainz	(Spain) Luis Moya	(United Kingdom) Ford Motor Co. Ltd.	Ford Focus RS WRC '00	4:25:00.7	+1:24.9	6
3	4	(Finland) Juha Kankkunen	(Finland) Juha Repo	(Japan) Subaru World Rally Team	Subaru Impreza S5 WRC '99	4:26:57.2	+3:21.4	4
4	8	(Finland) Toni Gardemeister	(Finland) Paavo Lukander	(Spain) SEAT Sport	SEAT Córdoba WRC Evo2	4:27:20.9	+3:45.1	3
5	18	(Belgium) Bruno Thiry	(Belgium) Stéphane Prévot	(Italy) H.F. Grifone SRL	Toyota Corolla WRC	4:28:24.2	+4:48.4	2
6	2	(Belgium) Freddy Loix	(Belgium) Sven Smeets	(Japan) Marlboro Mitsubishi Ralliart	Mitsubishi Carisma GT Evo VI	4:30:39.9	+7:04.1	1

=== World Rally Cars ===
==== Classification ====
Position		No.	Driver	Co-driver	Entrant	Car	Time	Difference	Points
Event	Class	No.	Driver	Co-driver	Entrant	Car	Time	Difference	Points
1	1	1	(Finland) Tommi Mäkinen	(Finland) Risto Mannisenmäki	(Japan) Marlboro Mitsubishi Ralliart	Mitsubishi Lancer Evo VI	4:23:35.8		10
2	2	6	(Spain) Carlos Sainz	(Spain) Luis Moya	(United Kingdom) Ford Motor Co. Ltd.	Ford Focus RS WRC '00	4:25:00.7	+1:24.9	6
3	3	4	(Finland) Juha Kankkunen	(Finland) Juha Repo	(Japan) Subaru World Rally Team	Subaru Impreza S5 WRC '99	4:26:57.2	+3:21.4	4
4	4	8	(Finland) Toni Gardemeister	(Finland) Paavo Lukander	(Spain) SEAT Sport	SEAT Córdoba WRC Evo2	4:27:20.9	+3:45.1	3
6	5	2	(Belgium) Freddy Loix	(Belgium) Sven Smeets	(Japan) Marlboro Mitsubishi Ralliart	Mitsubishi Carisma GT Evo VI	4:30:39.9	+7:04.1	1
7	6	11	(Germany) Armin Schwarz	(Germany) Manfred Hiemer	(Czech Republic) Škoda Motorsport	Škoda Octavia WRC	4:33:24.1	+9:48.3	0
10	7	12	(Spain) Luis Climent Asensio	(Spain) Álex Romaní	(Czech Republic) Škoda Motorsport	Škoda Octavia WRC	4:44:25.3	+20:49.5	0
Retired SS15		5	(United Kingdom) Colin McRae	(United Kingdom) Nicky Grist	(United Kingdom) Ford Motor Co. Ltd.	Ford Focus RS WRC '00	Engine		0
Retired SS14		7	(France) Didier Auriol	(France) Denis Giraudet	(Spain) SEAT Sport	SEAT Córdoba WRC Evo2	Engine		0
Retired SS7		3	(United Kingdom) Richard Burns	(United Kingdom) Robert Reid	(Japan) Subaru World Rally Team	Subaru Impreza S5 WRC '99	Engine		0
Retired SS7		9	(France) François Delecour	(France) Daniel Grataloup	(France) Peugeot Esso	Peugeot 206 WRC	Engine		0
Retired SS7		10	(France) Gilles Panizzi	(France) Hervé Panizzi	(France) Peugeot Esso	Peugeot 206 WRC	Engine		0
Retired SS7		17	(Finland) Marcus Grönholm	(Finland) Timo Rautiainen	(France) Peugeot Esso	Peugeot 206 WRC	Engine		0

==== Special stages ====
Day	Stage	Stage name	Length	Winner	Car	Time	Class leaders
Leg 1 (20 Jan)	SS1	Tourette du Château — Saint Antonin	24.81 km	(France) Gilles Panizzi	Peugeot 206 WRC	17:58.2	(France) Gilles Panizzi
Leg 1 (20 Jan)	SS2	Saint Pierre — Entrevaux	30.63 km	(Finland) Tommi Mäkinen	Mitsubishi Lancer Evo VI	22:17.7	(United Kingdom) Richard Burns
Leg 1 (20 Jan)	SS3	Norante — Etablissement Thermal	19.75 km	(United Kingdom) Richard Burns	Subaru Impreza S5 WRC '99	12:49.8	(United Kingdom) Richard Burns
Leg 1 (20 Jan)	SS4	Selonnet — Bréziers 1	17.94 km	(Finland) Tommi Mäkinen	Mitsubishi Lancer Evo VI	12:47.6	(Finland) Tommi Mäkinen
Leg 1 (20 Jan)	SS5	Rochebrune — Urtis 1	19.70 km	(Finland) Tommi Mäkinen	Mitsubishi Lancer Evo VI	16:19.8	(Finland) Tommi Mäkinen
Leg 2 (21 Jan)	SS6	L'Epine — Rosans	31.40 km	Stage cancelled			(Finland) Tommi Mäkinen
Leg 2 (21 Jan)	SS7	Ruissas — Eygalayes	27.70 km	(Finland) Juha Kankkunen	Subaru Impreza S5 WRC '99	17:01.6	(Finland) Tommi Mäkinen
Leg 2 (21 Jan)	SS8	Plan de Vitrolles — Faye	48.55 km	(Finland) Tommi Mäkinen	Mitsubishi Lancer Evo VI	31:06.1	(Finland) Tommi Mäkinen
Leg 2 (21 Jan)	SS9	Prunières — Embrun	34.12 km	(United Kingdom) Colin McRae	Ford Focus RS WRC '00	20:09.5	(Finland) Tommi Mäkinen
Leg 2 (21 Jan)	SS10	Saint Clément — Saint Saveur	20.58 km	(Finland) Tommi Mäkinen	Mitsubishi Lancer Evo VI	13:44.1	(Finland) Tommi Mäkinen
Leg 3 (22 Jan)	SS11	Selonnet — Bréziers 2	17.94 km	(United Kingdom) Colin McRae	Ford Focus RS WRC '00	12:46.1	(Finland) Tommi Mäkinen
Leg 3 (22 Jan)	SS12	Rochebrune — Urtis 2	19.70 km	(Finland) Tommi Mäkinen	Mitsubishi Lancer Evo VI	16:16.1	(Finland) Tommi Mäkinen
Leg 3 (22 Jan)	SS13	Sisteron — Thoard	36.94 km	(Finland) Juha Kankkunen	Subaru Impreza S5 WRC '99	25:04.0	(Finland) Tommi Mäkinen
Leg 3 (22 Jan)	SS14	Saint Auban — Bif. D10/D17	29.17 km	(Spain) Carlos Sainz	Ford Focus RS WRC '00	19:23.9	(Finland) Tommi Mäkinen
Leg 3 (22 Jan)	SS15	Sospel — La Bollène Vésubie	33.88 km	(Spain) Carlos Sainz	Ford Focus RS WRC '00	23:34.2	(Finland) Tommi Mäkinen

==== Championship standings ====
Pos.	Drivers' championships			Co-drivers' championships			Manufacturers' championships		
Pos.	Move	Driver	Points	Move	Co-driver	Points	Move	Manufacturer	Points
1	New entry	(Finland) Tommi Mäkinen	10	New entry	(Finland) Risto Mannisenmäki	10	New entry	(Japan) Marlboro Mitsubishi Ralliart	12
2	New entry	(Spain) Carlos Sainz	6	New entry	(Spain) Luis Moya	6	New entry	(United Kingdom) Ford Motor Co. Ltd.	6
3	New entry	(Finland) Juha Kankkunen	4	New entry	(Finland) Juha Repo	4	New entry	(Japan) Subaru World Rally Team	4
4	New entry	(Finland) Toni Gardemeister	3	New entry	(Finland) Paavo Lukander	3	New entry	(Spain) SEAT Sport	3
5	New entry	(Belgium) Bruno Thiry	2	New entry	(Belgium) Stéphane Prévot	2	New entry	(Czech Republic) Škoda Motorsport	1

=== FIA Cup for Production Rally Drivers ===
==== Classification ====
Position		No.	Driver	Co-driver	Entrant	Car	Time	Difference	Points
Event	Class	No.	Driver	Co-driver	Entrant	Car	Time	Difference	Points
9	1	21	(Austria) Manfred Stohl	(Austria) Peter Müller	(Austria) Manfred Stohl	Mitsubishi Lancer Evo VI	4:44:17.6		10
11	2	16	(Uruguay) Gustavo Trelles	(Argentina) Jorge Del Buono	(Uruguay) Gustavo Trelles	Mitsubishi Lancer Evo V	4:47:45.8	+3:28.2	6
12	3	25	(Italy) Gianluigi Galli	(Italy) Guido D'Amore	(Italy) Vieffe Corse SRL	Mitsubishi Lancer Evo V	4:48:34.2	+4:16.6	4
13	4	51	(Switzerland) Olivier Gillet	(Monaco) Freddy Delorme	(Switzerland) Olivier Gillet	Mitsubishi Lancer Evo VI	4:51:06.0	+6:48.4	3
14	5	24	(Italy) Andrea Maselli	(Italy) Nicola Arena	(Italy) Andrea Maselli	Mitsubishi Lancer Evo V	4:58:43.9	+14:26.3	2
15	6	23	(Slovenia) Boris Popovič	(Italy) Antonio Morassi	(Slovenia) Boris Popovič	Mitsubishi Lancer Evo VI	5:00:48.1	+16:30.5	1
17	7	54	(France) Claude Carret	(France) Julian Carret	(France) Claude Carret	Mitsubishi Lancer Evo VI	5:04:51.5	+20:33.9	0
18	8	61	(France) David Truphemus	(France) Pascal Saivre	(France) David Truphemus	Ford Escort RS Cosworth	5:07:31.9	+23:14.3	0
19	9	55	(Germany) Hermann Gassner Sr.	(Germany) Siegfried Schrankl	(Germany) Hermann Gassner Sr.	Proton Pert Evo V	5:07:59.0	+23:41.4	0
23	10	53	(France) Nicolas Latil	(France) Laurent Nicolas	(France) Nicolas Latil	Mitsubishi Lancer Evo V	5:10:34.1	+26:16.5	0
24	11	26	(Belgium) Pieter Tsjoen	(Belgium) Steven Vergalle	(France) Team Gamma	Mitsubishi Lancer Evo VI	5:11:40.6	+27:23.0	0
26	12	62	(Belgium) Bob Colsoul	(Belgium) Tom Colsoul	(Belgium) Bob Colsoul	Mitsubishi Lancer Evo IV	5:15:57.3	+31:39.7	0
28	13	57	(Italy) Marco Menegatto	(Italy) Roberto Vittori	(Italy) Marco Menegatto	Mitsubishi Lancer Evo VI	5:17:11.3	+32:53.7	0
29	14	76	(France) Brice Tirabassi	(France) Sabrina De Castelli	(France) Brice Tirabassi	Peugeot 306 Rallye	5:19:20.9	+35:03.3	0
30	15	79	(France) Pascal Imbert	(France) Jean-Claude Imbert	(France) Pascal Imbert	Renault Clio Williams	5:19:22.5	+35:04.9	0
31	16	82	(France) Christian Grillerer	(France) Stephane Cambou	(France) Christian Grillerer	Honda Integra Type-R	5:19:42.5	+35:24.9	0
32	17	83	(France) Bruno Zonta	(France) Roger Lassalle	(France) Bruno Zonta	Renault Clio Williams	5:25:16.2	+40:58.6	0
33	18	65	(Germany) Uwe Forkert	(Germany) Fred Winklhofer	(Germany) FWU Premium Rally Team	Mitsubishi Lancer Evo IV	5:26:05.2	+41:47.6	0
35	19	56	(France) Frédéric Schmit	(France) Christophe Schmit	(France) Frédéric Schmit	Mitsubishi Lancer Evo V	5:27:25.2	+43:07.6	0
38	20	74	(Germany) Jürgen Barth	(France) Jean-Claude Perramond	(Germany) Jürgen Barth	Seat Ibiza TDI	5:29:07.7	+44:50.1	0
40	21	92	(France) Roger Grimaud	(France) Jean-Christian Grimaud	(France) Roger Grimaud	Honda Civic VTi (EG6)	5:30:19.1	+46:01.5	0
41	22	77	(Germany) Horst Rotter	(Germany) Volker Schmidt	(Germany) Horst Rotter	Opel Astra GSi 16V	5:31:34.2	+47:16.6	0
43	23	89	(France) Pascal Allemand	(France) Florent Allemand	(France) Pascal Allemand	Peugeot 106 Rallye	5:37:09.7	+52:52.1	0
44	24	64	(Germany) Michael Stoschek	(Germany) Klaus Wagner	(Germany) Michael Stoschek	Mitsubishi Lancer Evo V	5:41:01.1	+56:43.5	0
45	25	85	(France) Jean-Pierre Roche	(France) Christophe Preve	(France) Jean-Pierre Roche	Renault Clio 16S	5:42:15.0	+57:57.4	0
46	26	84	(France) Miguel Baudoin	(France) Eric Mattei	(France) Miguel Baudoin	Renault Clio Williams	5:47:18.6	+1:03:01.0	0
47	27	58	(Italy) Marta Candian	(Italy) Mara Biotti	(Italy) Marta Candian	Mitsubishi Lancer Evo V	5:49:22.9	+1:05:05.3	0
48	28	91	(Belgium) Johan Bastiaens	(Belgium) Marc Ceyssens	(Belgium) Johan Bastiaens	Honda Civic VTi	5:50:11.6	+1:05:54.0	0
49	29	70	(France) Mickaël De Castelli	(France) Michel Robinet	(France) Mickaël De Castelli	Subaru Impreza GT Turbo	5:50:12.9	+1:05:55.3	0
50	30	71	(France) Lilian Polge	(France) Marie-Noëlle Polge	(France) Lilian Polge	Subaru Impreza GT Turbo	5:57:56.5	+1:13:38.9	0
51	31	59	(Finland) Raimo Hämeenniemi	(Finland) Jaakko Pikkarainen	(Finland) Raimo Hämeenniemi	Mitsubishi Lancer Evo III	5:58:05.5	+1:13:47.9	0
52	32	68	(France) Gérard Picot	(France) Nadine Gadet	(France) Gérard Picot	Subaru Impreza GT Turbo	5:59:47.0	+1:15:29.4	0
53	33	88	(France) Michel Bour	(France) Denise Bour	(France) Michel Bour	Citroën Saxo VTS	5:59:53.8	+1:15:36.2	0
55	34	95	(France) Thierry Chabanne	(France) Isabelle Bernard	(France) Thierry Chabanne	Peugeot 106 XSI	6:10:54.4	+1:26:36.8	0
56	35	75	(Italy) Gabriele Cadringher	(Italy) Gianfranco Serembre	(Italy) Gabriele Cadringher	Seat Ibiza TDI	6:22:07.9	+1:37:50.3	0
57	36	93	(France) Paul-Louis Ristori	(France) Lucie Paoli	(France) Paul-Louis Ristori	Peugeot 106 Rallye	6:23:15.9	+1:38:58.3	0
58	37	94	(France) Jean-Pierre Manavella	(France) Jean-Michel Mercier	(France) Jean-Pierre Manavella	Škoda Felicia	6:30:20.9	+1:46:03.3	0
59	38	72	(France) Christian Caffardo	(France) Marielle Vescovi	(France) Christian Caffardo	Subaru Impreza GT Turbo	7:09:28.8	+2:25:11.2	0
Retired SS15		66	(Czech Republic) Radek Švec	(Czech Republic) Hana Komarovová	(Czech Republic) Radek Švec	Mitsubishi Lancer Evo III	Accident		0
Retired SS14		60	(France) Richard Bourcier	(France) Jean-Marc Ducousso	(France) Richard Bourcier	Subaru Impreza GT Turbo	Mechanical		0
Retired SS13		67	(France) Serge Amorotti	(France) Hervé Amorotti	(France) Serge Amorotti	Ford Escort RS Cosworth	Mechanical		0
Retired SS10		22	(Germany) Uwe Nittel	(Germany) Detlef Ruf	(Germany) Uwe Nittel	Mitsubishi Carisma GT Evo VI	Mechanical		0
Retired SS9		81	(Monaco) Marc Dessi	(Monaco) Vanessa Dessi	(Monaco) Marc Dessi	Peugeot 205 GTI 1.9	Mechanical		0
Retired SS8		69	(Switzerland) François Bonny	(Switzerland) Christiane Bonny	(Switzerland) Lugano Racing Team	Ford Escort RS Cosworth	Accident		0
Retired SS8		87	(France) Michel Giry	(France) Marion Giry	(France) Michel Giry	Peugeot 306 S16	Accident		0
Retired SS8		90	(France) Jean-Noël Dupouy	(France) Olivier Bourgier	(France) Jean-Noël Dupouy	Peugeot 106 Rallye	Mechanical		0
Retired SS7		63	(Italy) Riccardo Garosci	(France) Jean-Charles Descamps	(Italy) Riccardo Garosci	Mitsubishi Lancer Evo VI	Mechanical		0
Retired SS7		73	(France) Frédéric Ruelle-Jourdain	(France) Pascal Serre	(France) Frédéric Ruelle-Jourdain	Mazda 323 GT-R	Mechanical		0
Retired SS7		80	(France) Stéphane Cornu	(France) Benoît Legras	(France) Stéphane Cornu	Peugeot 205 GTI 1.9	Mechanical		0
Retired SS5		78	(France) Serge Guiramand	(France) Jérôme Favier	(France) Serge Guiramand	Renault Clio Williams	Mechanical		0
Retired SS3		52	(France) Philippe Rognoni	(France) Etienne Patrone	(France) Philippe Rognoni	Mitsubishi Lancer Evo VI	Accident		0
Retired SS2		86	(France) Claude Bensimon	(France) Emmanuel Bracconi	(France) Claude Bensimon	Renault Clio Williams	Mechanical		0

==== Special stages ====
Day	Stage	Stage name	Length	Winner	Car	Time	Class leaders
Leg 1 (20 Jan)	SS1	Tourette du Château — Saint Antonin	24.81 km	(Italy) Gianluigi Galli	Mitsubishi Lancer Evo V	19:16.7	(Italy) Gianluigi Galli
Leg 1 (20 Jan)	SS2	Saint Pierre — Entrevaux	30.63 km	(Germany) Uwe Nittel	Mitsubishi Carisma GT Evo VI	24:00.3	(Germany) Uwe Nittel
Leg 1 (20 Jan)	SS3	Norante — Etablissement Thermal	19.75 km	(Germany) Uwe Nittel	Mitsubishi Carisma GT Evo VI	13:53.2	(Germany) Uwe Nittel
Leg 1 (20 Jan)	SS4	Selonnet — Bréziers 1	17.94 km	(Germany) Uwe Nittel	Mitsubishi Carisma GT Evo VI	13:42.7	(Germany) Uwe Nittel
Leg 1 (20 Jan)	SS5	Rochebrune — Urtis 1	19.70 km	(Germany) Uwe Nittel	Mitsubishi Carisma GT Evo VI	17:22.2	(Germany) Uwe Nittel
Leg 2 (21 Jan)	SS6	L'Epine — Rosans	31.40 km	Stage cancelled			(Germany) Uwe Nittel
Leg 2 (21 Jan)	SS7	Ruissas — Eygalayes	27.70 km	(Austria) Manfred Stohl	Mitsubishi Lancer Evo VI	18:10.9	(Germany) Uwe Nittel
Leg 2 (21 Jan)	SS8	Plan de Vitrolles — Faye	48.55 km	(Germany) Uwe Nittel	Mitsubishi Carisma GT Evo VI	33:05.4	(Germany) Uwe Nittel
Leg 2 (21 Jan)	SS9	Prunières — Embrun	34.12 km	(Italy) Gianluigi Galli	Mitsubishi Lancer Evo V	21:13.6	(Austria) Manfred Stohl
Leg 2 (21 Jan)	SS10	Saint Clément — Saint Saveur	20.58 km	(Austria) Manfred Stohl	Mitsubishi Lancer Evo VI	15:04.0	(Austria) Manfred Stohl
Leg 3 (22 Jan)	SS11	Selonnet — Bréziers 2	17.94 km	(Austria) Manfred Stohl	Mitsubishi Lancer Evo VI	13:16.0	(Austria) Manfred Stohl
Leg 3 (22 Jan)	SS12	Rochebrune — Urtis 2	19.70 km	(Austria) Manfred Stohl	Mitsubishi Lancer Evo VI	17:06.1	(Austria) Manfred Stohl
Leg 3 (22 Jan)	SS13	Sisteron — Thoard	36.94 km	(Switzerland) Olivier Gillet	Mitsubishi Lancer Evo VI	27:10.5	(Austria) Manfred Stohl
Leg 3 (22 Jan)	SS14	Saint Auban — Bif. D10/D17	29.17 km	(Austria) Manfred Stohl	Mitsubishi Lancer Evo VI	20:45.7	(Austria) Manfred Stohl
Leg 3 (22 Jan)	SS15	Sospel — La Bollène Vésubie	33.88 km	(Uruguay) Gustavo Trelles	Mitsubishi Lancer Evo V	25:57.2	(Austria) Manfred Stohl

==== Championship standings ====
Pos.	Drivers' championships		
Pos.	Move	Driver	Points
1	New entry	(Austria) Manfred Stohl	10
2	New entry	(Uruguay) Gustavo Trelles	6
3	New entry	(Italy) Gianluigi Galli	4
4	New entry	(Switzerland) Olivier Gillet	3
5	New entry	(Italy) Andrea Maselli	2
