= Brezigar =

Brezigar is a surname. Notable people with the surname include:

- Barbara Brezigar (born 1953), Slovene lawyer and politician
- Milko Brezigar (1886–1958), Slovene and Yugoslav liberal economist
