= Jazbec =

Jazbec is a surname. Notable people with the surname include:

- Jaka Jazbec, Italian sprint canoer
- Janez Jazbec (born 1984), Slovenian alpine skier
- Milan Jazbec (born 1956), Slovenian diplomat, professor and politician
- Zvonko Jazbec (1911–2015), Croatian footballer
