= Maja Makovec Brenčič =

Slovenian professor and politician

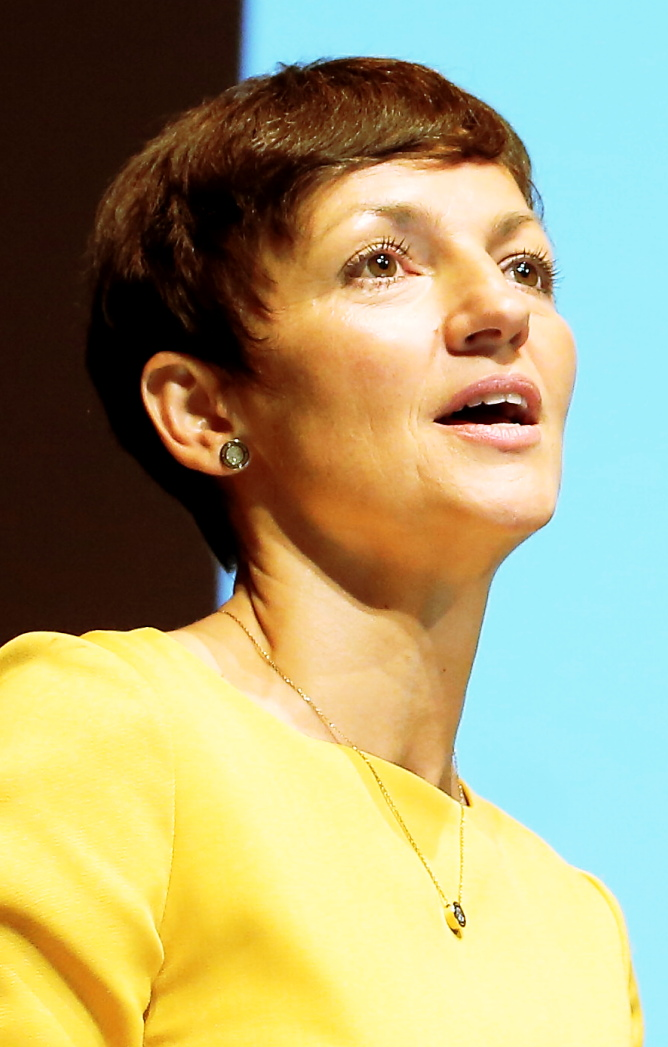
Maja Makovec Brenčič 2017 (cropped)

Maja Makovec Brenčič (born 27 May 1969 in Ljubljana) is a Slovenian professor.

Brenčič was the Minister of Education, Science, and Sport in Miro Cerar's cabinet. Prior to her entry into politics, she was a professor at the Faculty of Economics, University of Ljubljana, and a pro-rector of the university. She was the candidate of the Modern Centre Party in the 2017 presidential election in which she received 1.74% of the votes. Currently she is a professor at the Faculty of Economics, University of Ljubljana.
