= Andrej Šiško =

Slovenian far-right politician and convicted criminal

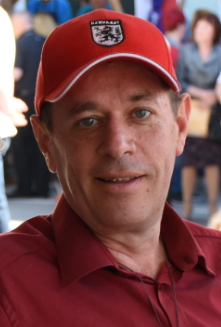
Andrej Šiško

Andrej Šiško (born 24 April 1969 in Koper) is a Slovenian far-right politician and convicted criminal. He is the head of the far-right United Slovenia Movement party.

In 1985, Šiško founded the Anti-Communist Organisation of Slovenia (AKOS) and the group's military wing, the Slovenian Liberation Army (OSA). In 1987, began studying at the Higher School of Economics in Maribor.

Šiško was a member of the Slovenian Democratic Alliance when Slovenia transitioned to a multi-party system.

In 2006, Šiško was sentenced for attempted murder of Milan Klement which happened in 1992 to 24 months in prison, but he was released after 22 months.

In 2017, he entered the presidential race, winning 2,21% of the popular vote in the presidential election.

Šiško was convicted to eight months for the incitement to change the constitutional order. By the time of conviction, he had spent more than six months in jail. In October 2019, the Maribor Appeals Court confirmed the conviction. In December 2019, he did not appear in the prison and police issued a search warrant against him. On January 4, 2020, he was arrested in Osankarica, Pohorje, when he attended the Pohorje Battalion commemoration. He claimed that he wished to pay tribute to 69 Slovenian victims killed by Nazis.
