= Mitja Gaspari =

Slovenian politician (born 1951)

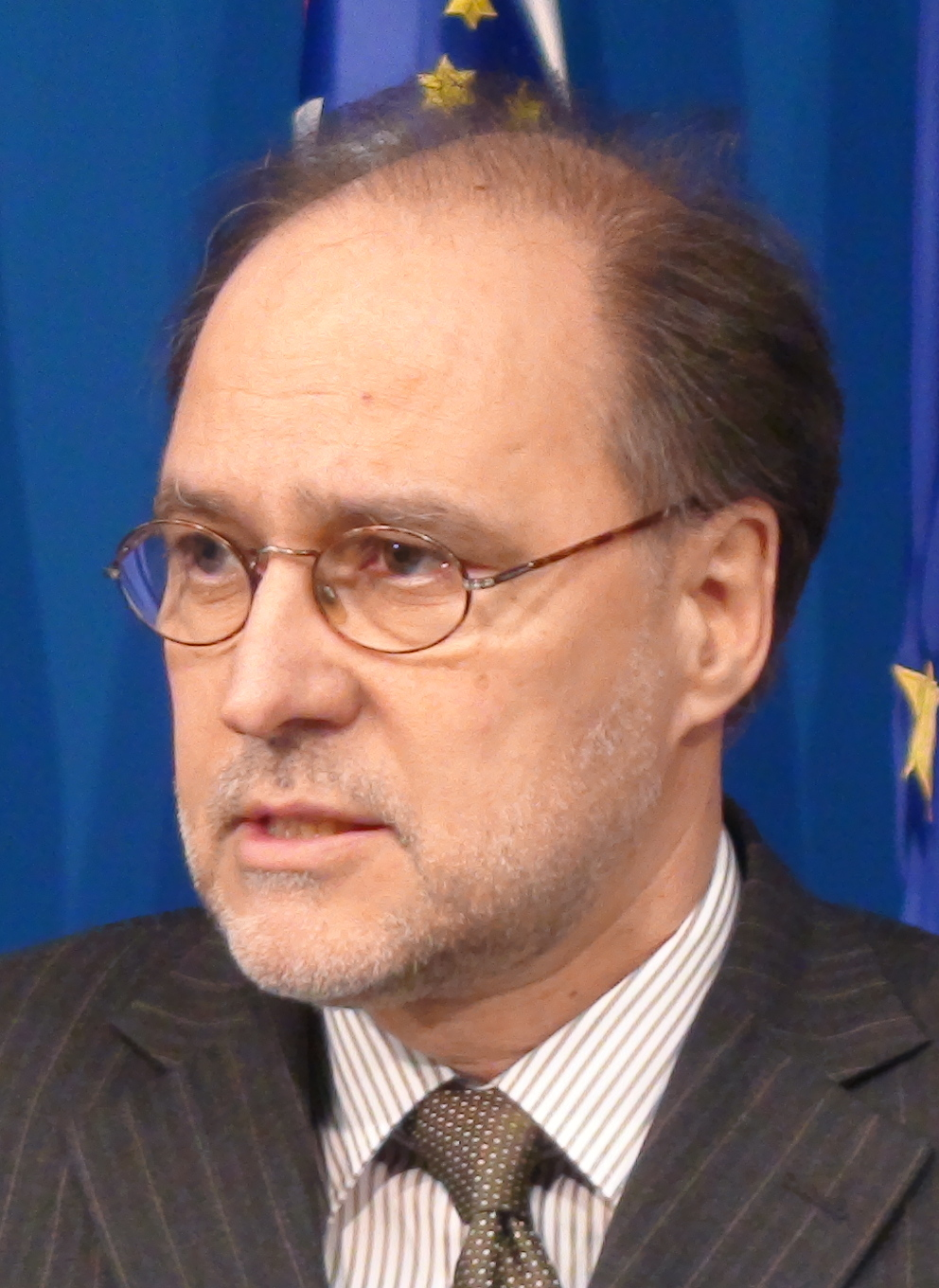
Mitja Gaspari in 2011

Mitja Gaspari (born 25 November 1951) is a Slovenian economist, banker, and politician. He served as Minister for Economic Development in the government of Borut Pahor.

== Early life and education ==
Gaspari was born in Ljubljana. He studied economics at the University of Ljubljana and has graduated in monetary economics from the University of Belgrade Faculty of Economics.

== Career ==
=== Career in the public sector ===
Gaspari worked in the National Bank of Yugoslavia, where he became vice-governor in 1988. In September 1991, he became a senior advisor in the World Bank. Between 1992 and 2000, he served as Slovenian Minister of Finance in the governments of Janez Drnovšek. Although he was considered close to the ruling Liberal Democracy of Slovenia, he never joined the party.

Gaspari served as the governor of the Bank of Slovenia between 2001 and 2007. During his mandate, Slovenia adopted the euro as its official currency.

=== Political career ===
Gaspari was among the candidates at the 2007 Slovenian presidential election, supported by the Liberal Democracy of Slovenia. He received 24.09% of the votes in the first round, finishing third. In 2012, he was nominated as Slovenia's candidate to succeed José Manuel González-Páramo on the Executive Board of the European Central Bank; the position eventually went to Yves Mersch.

In 2008, Gaspari was appointed Minister for Economic Development in the left-wing government of Borut Pahor.
