= Zmago Jelinčič Plemeniti =

Slovenian politician

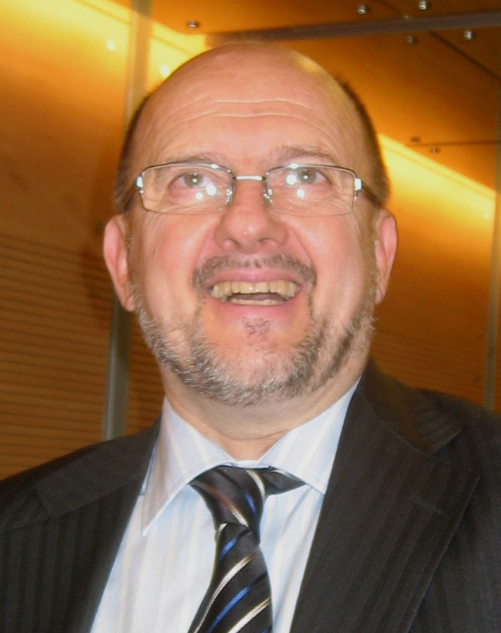

Personal details
- Born: January 7, 1948 (age 78) Maribor, PR Slovenia, FPR Yugoslavia
- Party: Slovenian National Party

Zmago Jelinčič Plemeniti (born January 7, 1948) is a Slovenian politician and author. He is the head of the Slovenian National Party (Slovene: Slovenska Nacionalna Stranka, SNS).

== Biography ==
Jelinčič was born in the eastern Slovenian city of Maribor in what was then the Socialist Federal Republic of Yugoslavia. As a teenager, he moved with his family to the Slovenian capital Ljubljana, where he attended the Poljane Grammar School. He studied pharmacy at the University of Ljubljana, but later dropped out. He obtained his degree some thirty years later from University of Skopje, Macedonia. During his student years, he also practiced as a ballet dancer in the Ljubljana opera house.

In March 1991, he founded the Slovenian National Party, which won more than 11% of votes in the first elections to the Slovenian National Assembly in 1992.

Jelinčič was a candidate in the 2002 Presidential Elections and polled 8.49% of the first-round vote, coming third among nine candidates. He ran in the 2007 election as well, finishing 4th and winning almost 20% of the vote. In April 2017 he announced his intention to run once more in the 2017 Presidential Election.

== Electoral performance ==
=== Presidential ===
Election year	Candidate	1st round		2nd round	
Election year	Candidate	# of overall votes	% of overall vote	# of overall votes	% of overall vote
2002	Zmago Jelinčič Plemeniti	97,178	8.49 #3 ▲		
2007	Zmago Jelinčič Plemeniti	188,951	19.16 #4 ▲		
