= Začnimo znova =

Slovenian television series

Začnimo znova (Let's start again) is a Slovenian television family comedy series. directed by Vojko Anzlejc and written by Vojka Anzeljc, Miha Čelarja, Thomas Grubar and Miran Mate. The music is composed by Miha Stabej. It was shown on TV Slovenia.

== The main characters ==
Character	Actor	Occupation
Toni Oven	Matjaž Tribušon	Father Blaška and Anže (head of the family)
Betka Oven	Lučka Počkaj	Mommy Blaška and Anže
Marjeta Oven	Aanica Kumer	Toni's mother
Blaška Oven#1	Viktorija Bencik	Betina and Tomi daughter
Anže Oven	Edvin Dervišević	Betkin and Toni's son
Jonny	Franci Kek	family friend
Blaška Oven#2	Anja Krvina	Betkina and Toni's daughter
Štef železna roka (Štef Iron arm)	Gregor Čušin	Underworld boss who likes to collect the interest on the borrowed money. Nickname iron hand got stiff because, vestigial hands as a result of his premature birth.
Žvala	Neno Muždeka	bodyguard Štef and bone breaker
Evgen	Boris Kobal	Betkin father
Svetlana	Alenka Kozolc	Russian artiste given by the boss of the underworld in guarding Toni
