= Franci Kek =

Slovenian actor (born 1964)

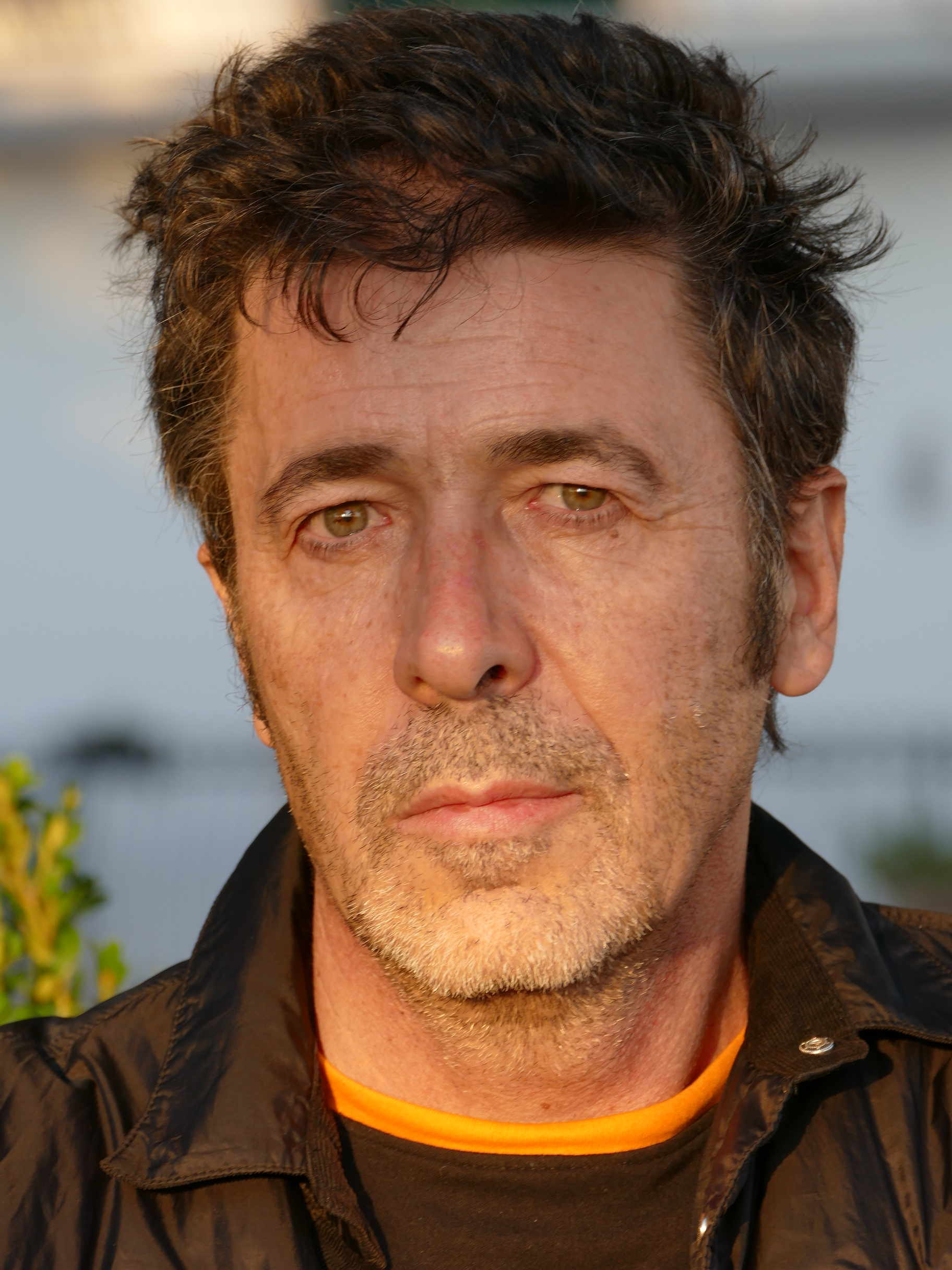
Franci Kek

Franci Kek (born 25 January 1964) is a Slovenian actor. He was elected as the head of the Active Slovenia party on its founding on 8 May 2004. Kek is the organizer of Rock Otočec, a large annual rock festival. Kek and Saša Đukić wrote, produced and starred in the 2002 film Na svoji Vesni. They have been creating films together since 1995. He has also been a city councilor in Novo Mesto.

== Filmography ==
- Začnimo znova
