= Milan Jazbec =

Slovenian diplomat, professor, journalist and politician

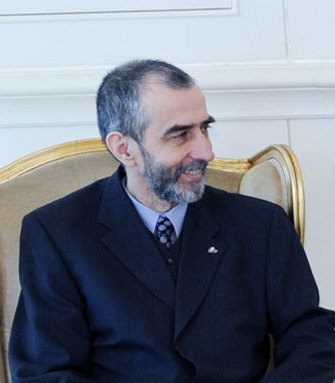
- Milan Jazbec, 2011

Personal details
- Born: June 22, 1956 (age 70) Spodnja Pohanca, SR Slovenia, Yugoslavia (now Slovenia)
- Education: University of Ljubljana, University of Klagenfurt

Milan Jazbec is a Slovenian diplomat, professor, journalist and politician. Between 8 of December 2000 and 31. of October 2004 he worked on the Slovenian Ministry of Defense.On 19 February 2017 he officially announced his candidacy for the 5th President of Slovenia on the Slovenian presidential election 2017 as an independent candidate.

== Career ==
=== Yugoslav period ===
During his studies in 1981 he was designated for propaganda and information in the Republican Committee of the Union of Socialist Youth of Slovenia (RK ZSMS). In between 1982 and 1985 he was committed to informing of the employees of the Krško paper mill. In 1987 he applied for a position in the Yugoslav diplomacy and was successful along with three other Slovenians. Until 1991 he worked at the Federal Secretariat for Foreign Affairs in Belgrade and after the Independence of Slovenia in June of the same year, he returned to Ljubljana, but soon continued his path in Klagenfurt, where he took charge of the consulate of his young home country of Slovenia.

=== Republic of Slovenia ===
After the expiry of the mandate in 1995 and a short stop at the Ministry of Foreign Affairs (MFA) in Ljubljana, his diplomatic path led him to Stockholm where he spent four years as Minister Plenipotentiary for the five Nordic and the three Baltic countries. In December 2000, he moved to the Slovenian Ministry of Defense, where he was a state secretary in charge of internal relations. From 2006 to 2010, he took over the management of the sector for Policy Planning and Research at the Ministry of Foreign Affairs. The net position he took was an ambassadorial position in Turkey, which was followed by an ambassadorial position in Macedonia. In April 2017 Jazbec flew to Slovenia and announced his candidacy for the 5th President of Slovenia on the Slovenian presidential election 2017 as an independent candidate.
