= Boris Popovič =

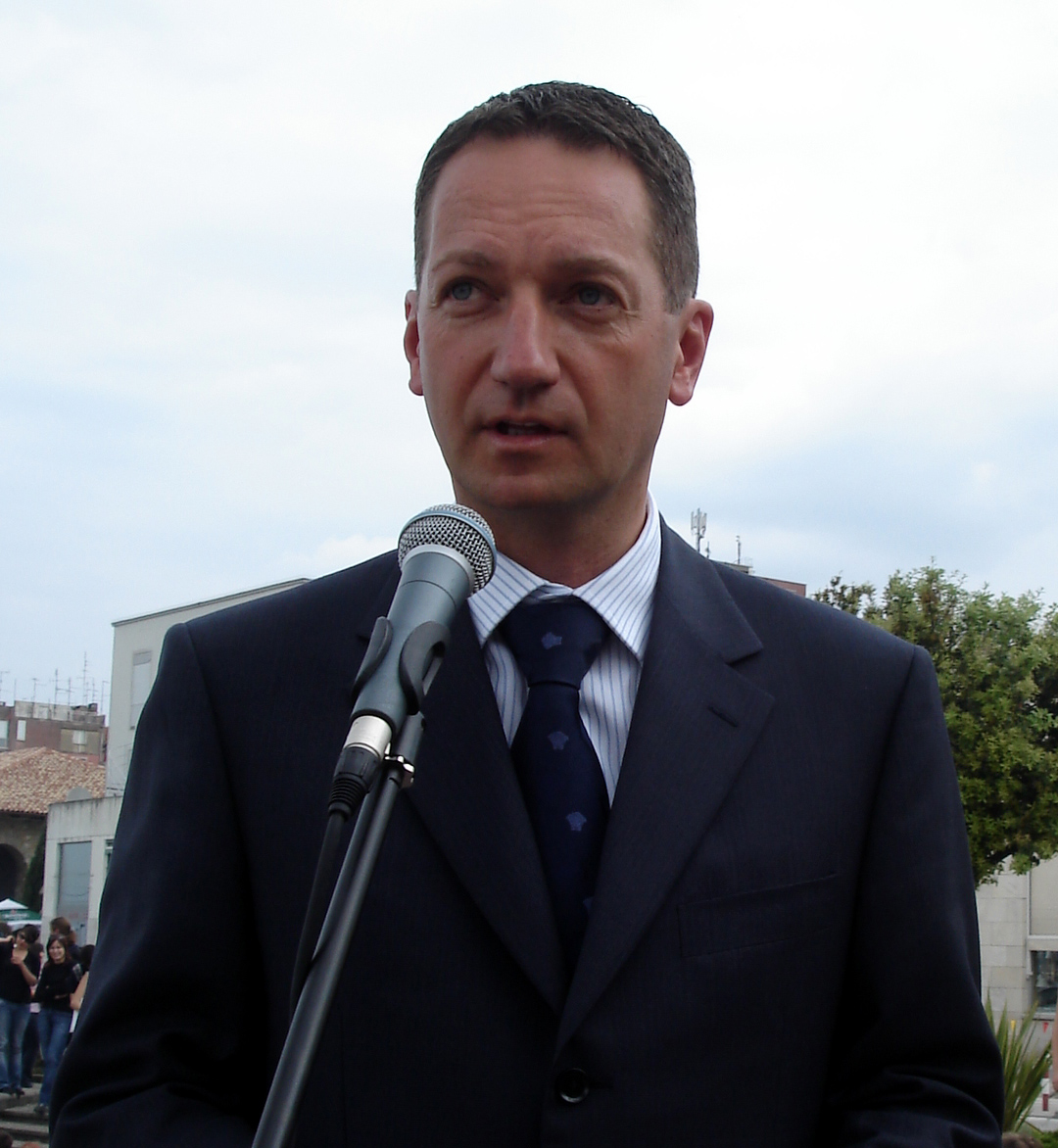

Mayor of Koper
- In office 19 December 2002 – 21 December 2018
- Preceded by: Dino Pucer
- Succeeded by: Aleš Bržan

Personal details
- Born: 5 September 1962 (age 64) Koper, PR Slovenia, FPR Yugoslavia
- Party: SJN
- Education: University of Ljubljana

Boris Popovič (born 5 September 1962) is a Slovene politician and entrepreneur of Montenegrin descent who served as Mayor of Koper, Slovenia's fifth largest city from 2002 to 2018. Prior to his political career, he was an accomplished rally driver and was the national rally champion in Slovenia in 1999. He ran in the 2017 Slovenian presidential election for the regionalist Slovenia is Ours political party but finished sixth.
