= Slovenia Is Ours =

Slovenia is Ours (Slovene: Slovenija je naša) was a Slovenian regionalist political party, active in the Slovenian Littoral. It was composed by three local parties, active in Slovenian Istria, namely 'Koper is Ours' (led by then the mayor of Koper Boris Popovič), 'Izola is Ours' (led by then the mayor of Izola Tomislav Klokočovnik), and 'Piran is Ours', led by then the mayor Tomaž Gantar.

At the 2004 parliamentary election, the party won 2.6% of the popular vote and no seats. It did not participate in the 2008 parliamentary election. As of September 2008, its leader was Boris Popovič, then the mayor of Koper. The party did not participate in the early 2011 Slovenian parliamentary election on 4 December 2011. The party hasn't participated in any elections since.
