= 2002 Slovenian presidential election =

- 10 November 2002 (first round); 1 December 2002 (second round)
- Turnout: 72.04% (first round); 65.24% (second round)
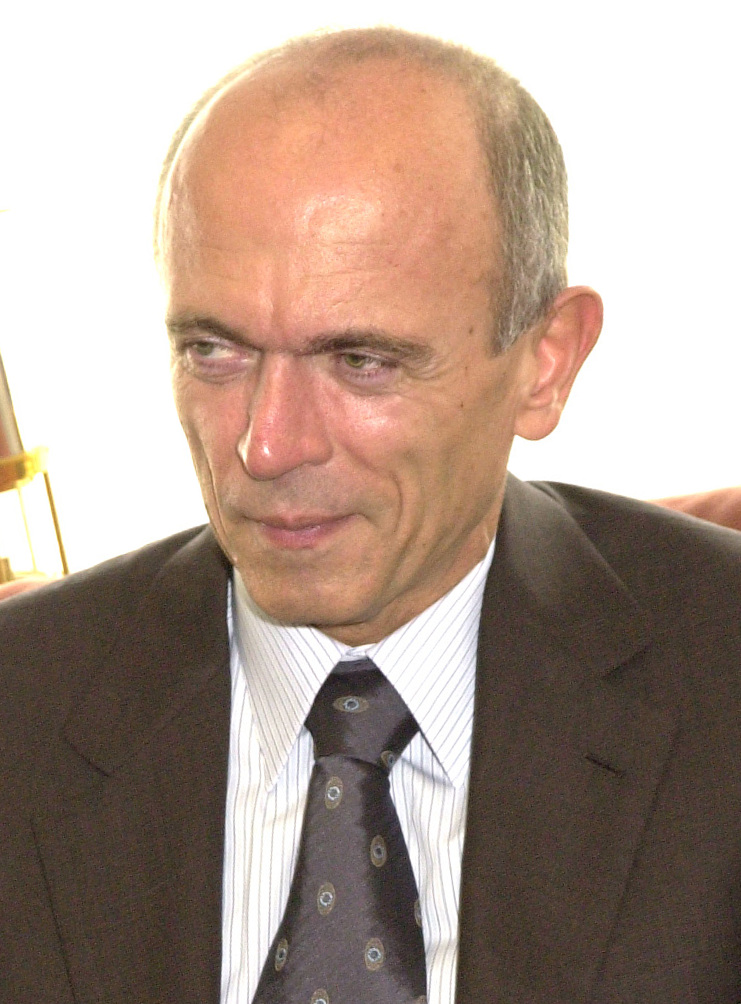

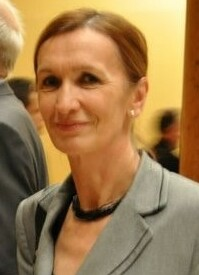
Nominee	Janez Drnovšek	Barbara Brezigar
Party	LDS	Independent
Popular vote	586,263	449,995
Percentage	56.58%	43.42%
President before election
Milan Kučan
Independent
Elected President
Janez Drnovšek
LDS

Presidential elections were held in Slovenia in 2002. The first round was held on 10 November, with a run-off held on 1 December after no candidate passed the 50% threshold in the first round. The result was a victory for Janez Drnovšek, who won 56.6% of the vote in the second round. Voter turnout was 72.04% in the first round and 65.24% in the second.

== Results ==
Candidate	Party	First round		Second round	
Candidate	Party	Votes	%	Votes	%
Janez Drnovšek	Liberal Democracy of Slovenia	508,114	44.39	586,263	56.58
Barbara Brezigar	Independent	352,520	30.80	449,995	43.42
Zmago Jelinčič Plemeniti	Slovenian National Party	97,178	8.49		
France Arhar	Independent	86,836	7.59		
France Bučar	Independent	37,069	3.24		
Lev Kreft	United List of Social Democrats	25,715	2.25		
Anton Bebler	Democratic Party of Pensioners of Slovenia	21,165	1.85		
Gorazd Drevenšek	New Slovenia	9,791	0.86		
Jure Jurček Cekuta	Independent	6,184	0.54		
Total		1,144,572	100.00	1,036,258	100.00
Valid votes		1,144,572	98.69	1,036,258	98.64
Invalid/blank votes		15,209	1.31	14,275	1.36
Total votes		1,159,781	100.00	1,050,533	100.00
Registered voters/turnout		1,609,985	72.04	1,610,234	65.24
Source: European Elections Database
