= Lev Kreft =

Slovenian philosopher (born 1951)

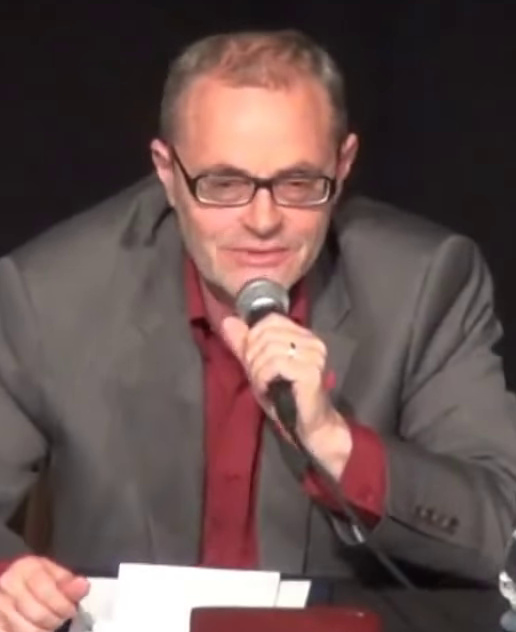
- Lev Kreft in 2013
- Born: 15 September 1951 (age 74); Ljubljana, Slovenia, Yugoslavia

Philosophical work
- Era: 20th century
- Region: Slovenia
- School: Marxism, Frankfurt school, postmodernism
- Main interests: Aesthetics, cultural philosophy, political philosophy, social philosophy, ethics, cultural sociology

Lev Kreft (born 15 September 1951) is a Slovenian politician, former Member of Parliament, editor, philosopher and sociologist.

== Biography ==
He was elected into the first Parliament of the Republic of Slovenia in 1992 and acted as Vice President of Parliament during that term.

He has lectured at the following institutions:

- Faculty of Philosophy in Ljubljana
- Faculty of Biotechnology in Ljubljana
- Academy of Music in Ljubljana
- Faculty of Arts in Ljubljana
- Teachers' Academy in Ljubljana.

He co-founded the Forum 21 movement in 2004.

His father was the Slovene playwright Bratko Kreft.
