= Barbara Brezigar =

Slovenian lawyer and politician

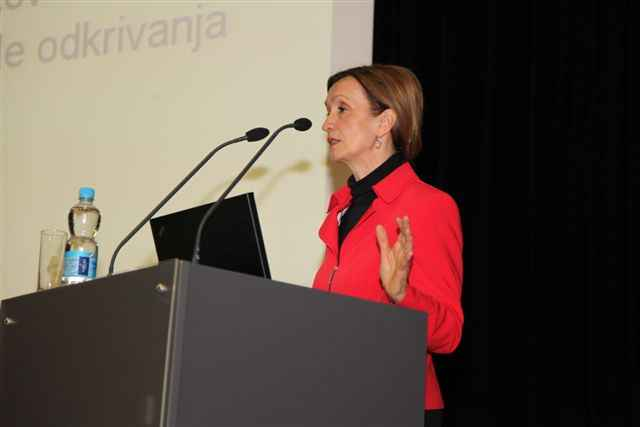
Barbara Brezigar in 2011

Barbara Brezigar (born 1 December 1953) is a Slovenian lawyer and politician. She currently serves as Secretary General at the Ministry of the Interior of Slovenia.

She was born in a middle-class family in Ljubljana as Barbara Gregorin. Her uncle on her mother's side was the famous Slovene literary critic, essayist and theatre director Bojan Štih.

After finishing the Bežigrad Grammar School, she enrolled at the University of Ljubljana where she studied law. In 1993, she became the head of the section for economic and business crimes in the Slovenian public prosecution. In 1996, the Prosecutor General Anton Drobnič appointed her as head of a special group of prosecutors for corporate and organized crime. In 1997, she became a member of a Council of Experts of the Council of Europe on money laundry. In 1999, she ran as a candidate for Prosecutor General of Slovenia, but the government led by Janez Drnovšek appointed Zdenka Cerar instead. The same year, Brezigar stepped down as head of the Special Group of prosecutors in disagreement with the newly appointed Prosecutor General.

In June 2000, Brezigar was appointed Minister of Justice in the short-lived centre right government of Andrej Bajuk. The September of the same year, she unsuccessfully ran for the Slovenian National Assembly on the list of the Slovenian Democratic Party. In the 2002 Slovenian presidential election, she ran for President of Slovenia with the support of the Slovenian Democratic Party and New Slovenia. She was defeated in the run-off elections by Janez Drnovšek.

In 2004, she was among the co-founders of the liberal conservative civic platform Rally for the Republic (Slovene: Zbor za republiko).

In 2005 she was appointed State Prosecutor General by the centre right government of Janez Janša. During the centre-left government of Borut Pahor, she entered in conflict with the Minister of Justice Aleš Zalar on the issue of interference of the ministry into the matters of the persecution. In 2011, she was replaced by Zvonko Fišer.

In March 2012, she was appointed State Secretary at the Minister of Interior by the centre-right government of Janez Janša.

She is married and has two children. She lives in Ljubljana.

Political offices
| Preceded by Tomaž Marušič | Minister of Justice of Slovenia; 7 June 2000 – 30 November 2000 | Succeeded by Ivan Bizjak |
| Preceded by Zdenka Cerar | Prosecutor General of Slovenia; 2005 – 2011 | Succeeded by Zvonko Fišer |
