= Minister of Foreign Affairs of Slovenia =

Slovenian cabinet official

Minister of Foreign Affairs of the Republic of Slovenia
- Minister za zunanje zadeve Republike Slovenije
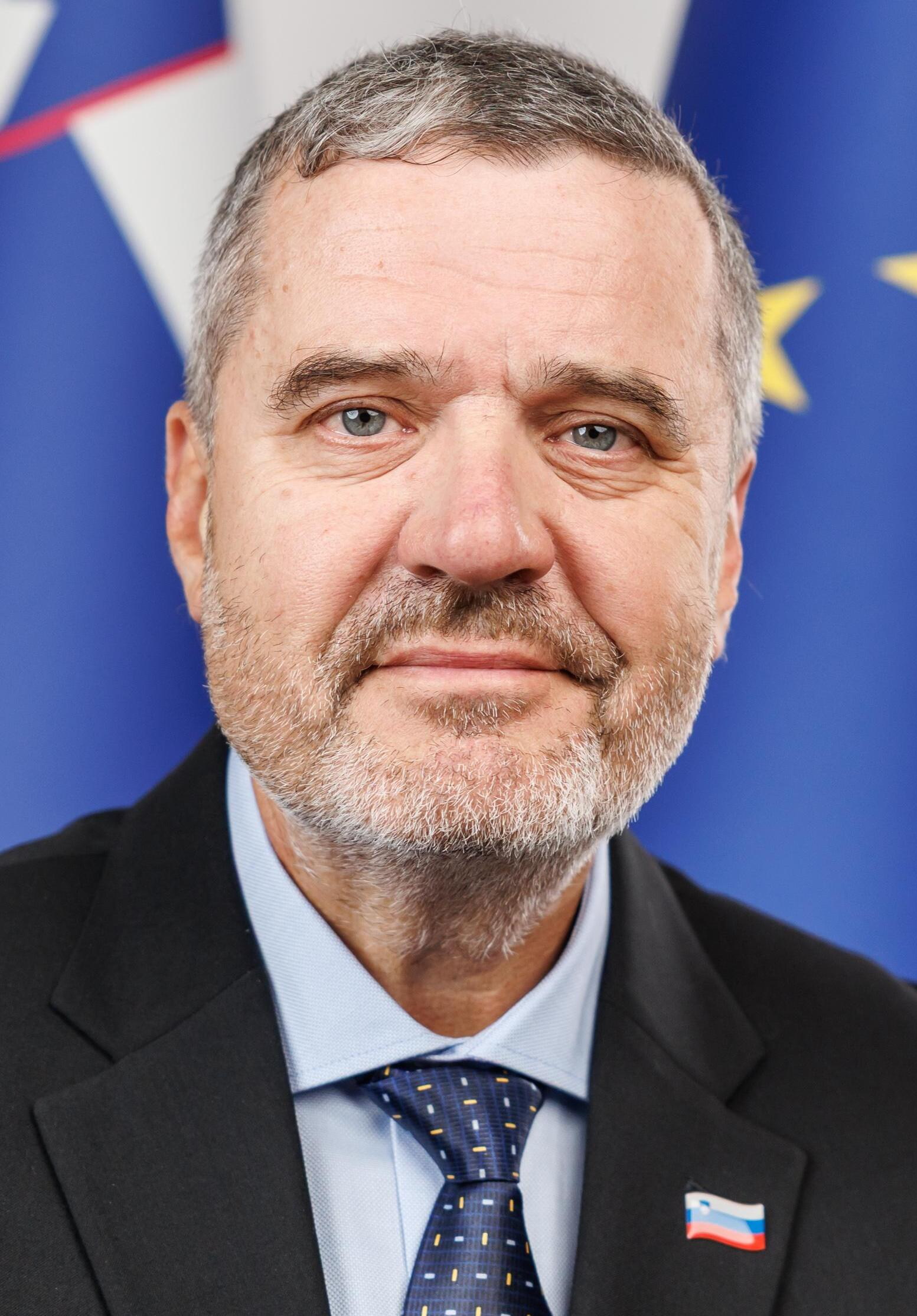
- Incumbent; Tone Kajzer since 4 June 2026
- Government of Slovenia; Ministry of Foreign Affairs
- Style: Mr. Minister; Slovenian: Gospod minister (formal); His Excellency; Slovenian: Njegova ekscelenca (in international correspondence)
- Status: Minister of Foreign Affairs
- Member of: Government of Slovenia; Foreign Affairs Council; General Affairs Council; National Security Council; Strategic Council for Foreign Affairs
- Reports to: National Assembly of the Republic of Slovenia; Prime Minister
- Residence: None
- Seat: Prešernova cesta 25, 1000 Ljubljana, Slovenia; Ministry of Foreign Affairs of the Republic of Slovenia also: Mladika
- Nominator: Prime Minister
- Appointer: National Assembly on the proposal of the Prime Minister
- Term length: No term limit
- Constituting instrument: Law on the Government of the Republic of Slovenia
- Inaugural holder: Dimitrij Rupel (as a Secretary of International Cooperation in the Executive Council of the Assembly of the Republic of Slovenia)
- Formation: 16 May 1990
- Deputy: de iure None de facto State Secretary at the Ministry of Foreign Affairs
- Salary: € 5.311 monthly (basic salary)
- Website: www.mzz.gov.si/si/

The minister of foreign affairs of the Republic of Slovenia (Slovene: Minister za zunanje zadeve Republike Slovenije) is a senior official of the Government of Slovenia, and head of the Ministry of Foreign Affairs. They are, together with the prime minister and president of the Republic, responsible for foreign policy and international relations of the Republic Slovenia.

The foreign minister is nominated by the prime minister-designate and elected by the National Assembly of the Republic of Slovenia, following the hearing and confirmation by its Committee on Foreign Policy. Usually, but not always, the foreign minister is also the deputy prime minister, since the position is held by one of the government coalition party leaders.

The foreign minister is member of the National Security Council and president of the Strategic Council for Foreign Affairs. Minister is also member of the EU bodies - Foreign and General Affairs Councils.

The 12th and current minister of foreign affairs is Tone Kajzer. He was elected and sworn in by the National Assembly on 4 June 2026.

== List of ministers of foreign affairs ==
#	Minister	Party	Prime Minister		Government	Term		Ref.
1	Dimitrij Rupel	DEMOS	Lojze Peterle	DEMOS	First	16 May 1990	14 May 1992	
1	Dimitrij Rupel	LDS	Janez Drnovšek	LDS	Second	14 May 1992	25 January 1993	
2	Lojze Peterle	NSi	Janez Drnovšek	LDS	Third	25 January 1993	31 October 1994	
3	Zoran Thaler	LDS	Janez Drnovšek	LDS	Third	26 January 1995	16 May 1996	
4	Davorin Kračun	LDS	Janez Drnovšek	LDS	Third	19 July 1996	27 February 1997	
(3)	Zoran Thaler	LDS	Janez Drnovšek	LDS	Fourth	27 February 1997	25 September 1997	
5	Boris Frlec	LDS	Janez Drnovšek	LDS	Fourth	25 September 1997	2 February 2000	
(1)	Dimitrij Rupel	LDS	Janez Drnovšek	LDS	Fourth	2 February 2000	7 June 2000	
(2)	Lojze Peterle	NSi	Andrej Bajuk	NSi	Fifth	7 June 2000	30 November 2000	
(1)	Dimitrij Rupel	LDS	Janez Drnovšek	LDS	Sixth	30 November 2000	19 December 2002	
(1)	Dimitrij Rupel	LDS	Tone Rop	LDS	Seventh	19 December 2002	6 July 2004	
6	Ivo Vajgl	LDS	Tone Rop	LDS	Seventh	6 July 2004	3 December 2004	
(1)	Dimitrij Rupel	SDS	Janez Janša	SDS	Eighth	3 December 2004	7 November 2008	
7	Samuel Žbogar	SD	Borut Pahor	SD	Ninth	21 November 2008	20 September 2011	
8	Karl Erjavec	DeSUS	Janez Janša	SDS	Tenth	10 February 2012	22 February 2013	
8	Karl Erjavec	DeSUS	Alenka Bratušek	SAB	Eleventh	20 March 2013	18 September 2014	
8	Karl Erjavec	DeSUS	Miro Cerar	SMC	Twelfth	18 September 2014	13 September 2018	
9	Miro Cerar	SMC	Marjan Šarec	LMŠ	Thirteenth	13 September 2018	13 March 2020	
10	Anže Logar	SDS	Janez Janša	SDS	Fourteenth	13 March 2020	1 June 2022	
11	Tanja Fajon	SD	Robert Golob	GS	Fifteenth	1 June 2022	4 June 2026	
12	Tone Kajzer	SDS	Janez Janša	SDS	Sixteenth	4 June 2026	Incumbent	
