= Šinigoj =

Šinigoj (also spelled Sinigoj and Sinigoi) is a Slovene surname. Notable people with the surname include:

- Caterina Sinigoi (born 2003), Slovene Olympic alpine skier
- Damijan Šinigoj (born 1964), Slovene writer
- Dušan Šinigoj (1933–2024), Slovene politician
