= Žbogar =

Žbogar is a Slovene surname. Notable people with the surname include:

- Robert Žbogar (born 1989), Slovenian swimmer
- Samuel Žbogar (born 1962), Slovenian diplomat
- Vasilij Žbogar (born 1975), Slovenian sailor
