= 1990 Slovenian parliamentary election =

Election of the lower house of the Slovenian legislature

- 8 April 1990

All 80 seats in the Sociopolitical Chamber 40 seats needed for a majority
- Turnout: 83.29% (total participants); 83.09% (cast ballots)
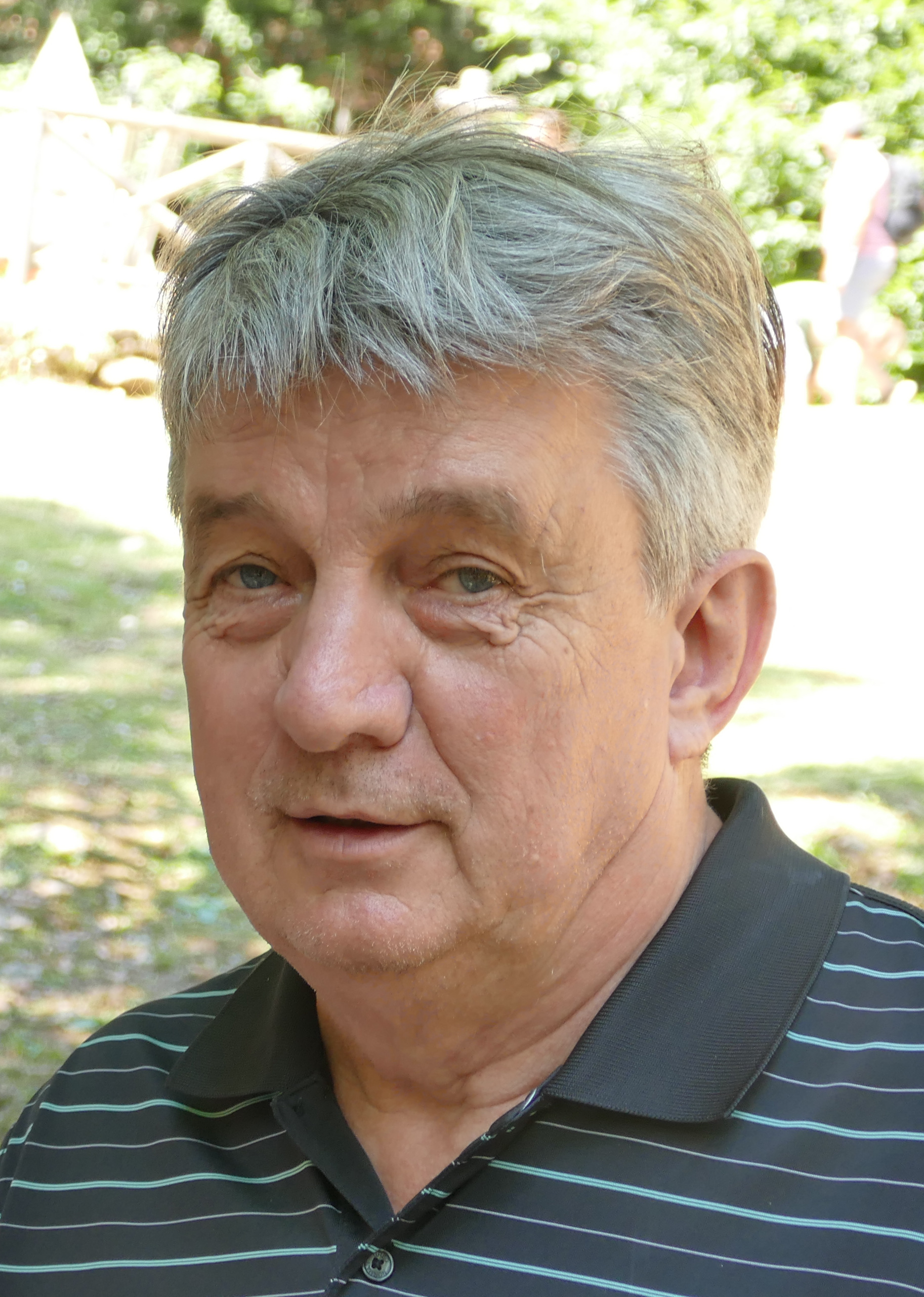

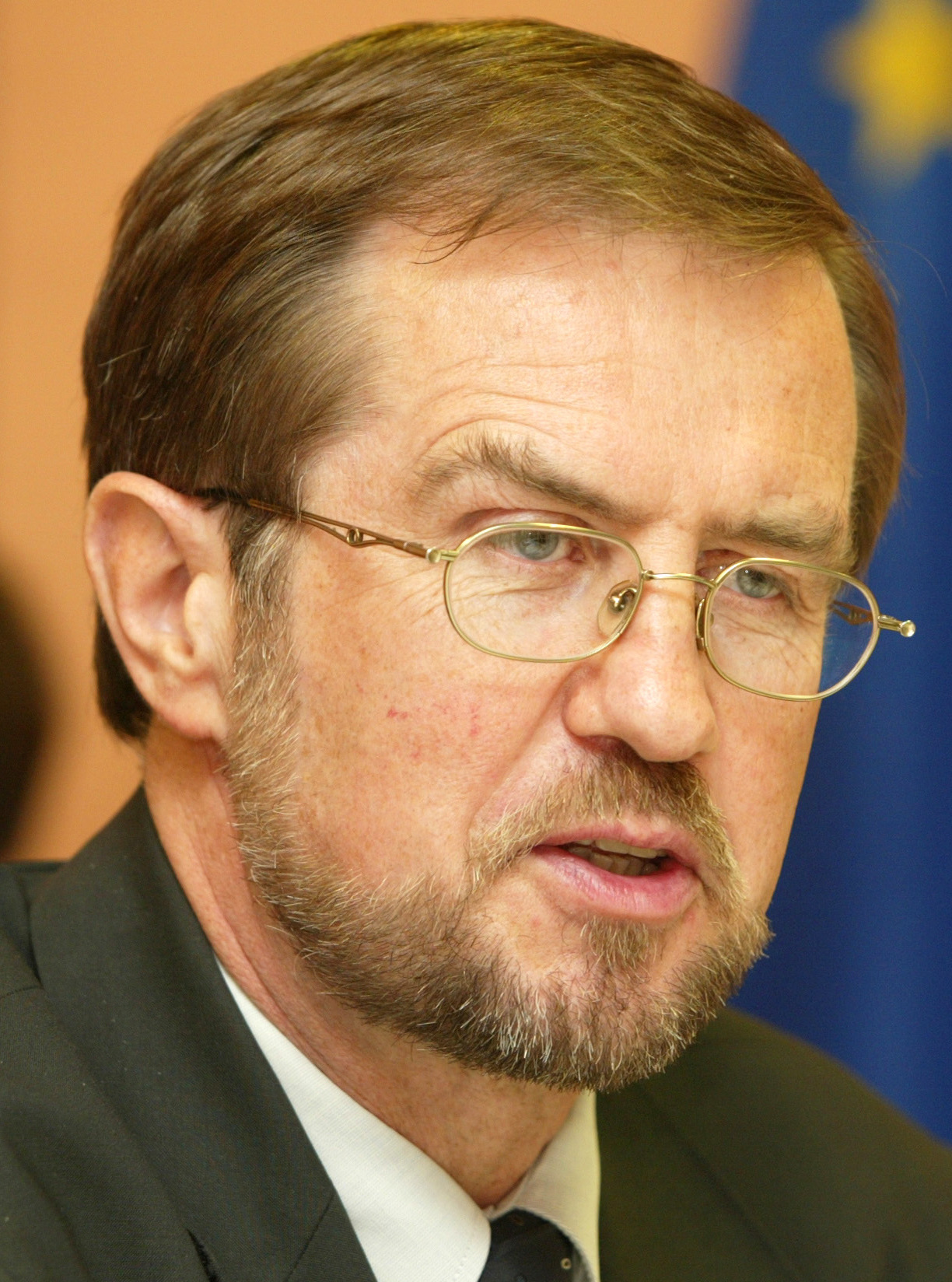

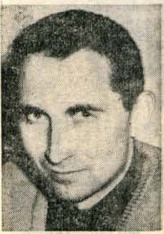

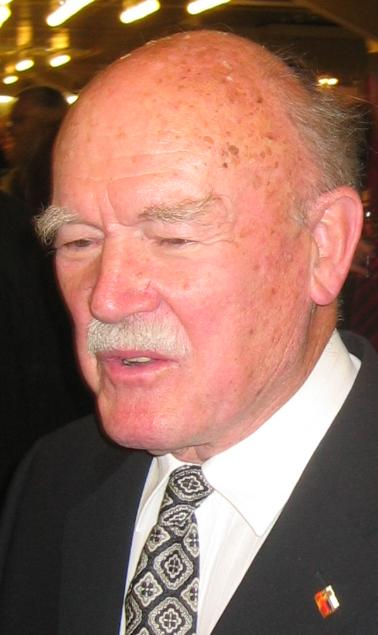

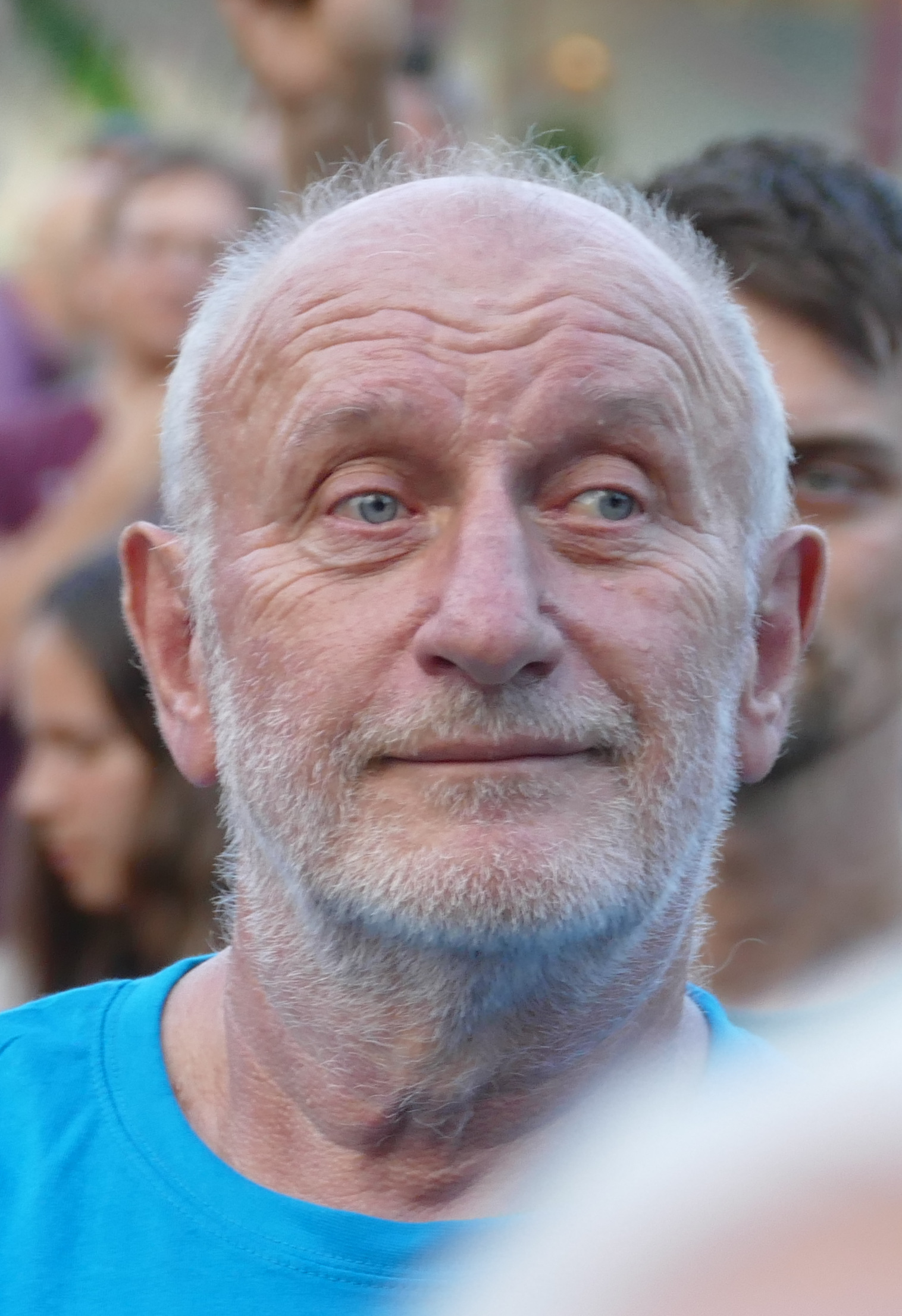

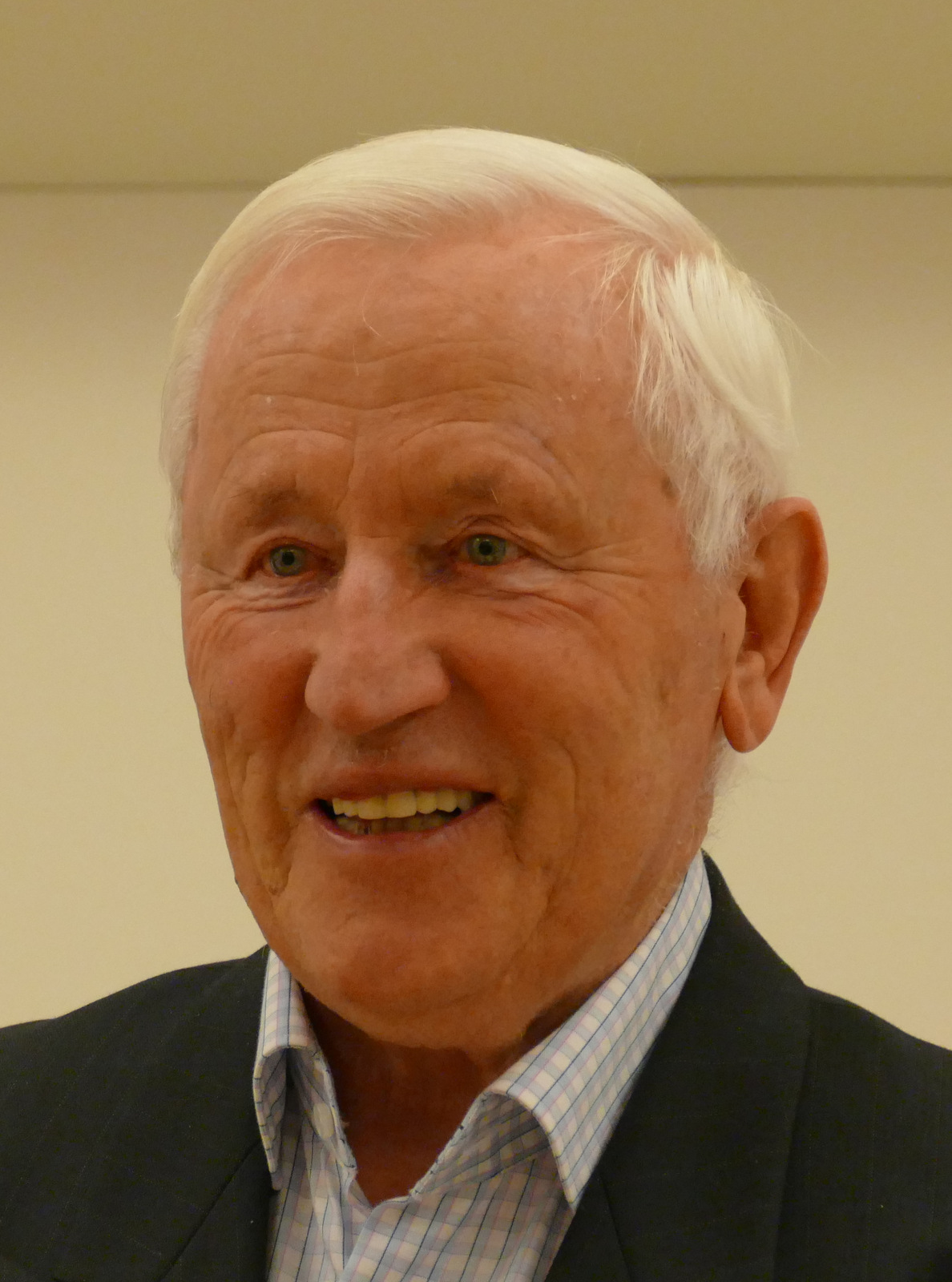
	First party	Second party	Third party
Leader	Ciril Ribičič	Jožef Školč	Lojze Peterle
Party	ZKS-SDP	ZSMS	SKD
Alliance			DEMOS
Leader since	23 December 1989	19 July 1988	19 January 1990
Seats before	10	10	New
Seats won	14	12	11
Popular vote	186,928	156,843	140,403
Percentage	17.28%	14.49%	12.98%
	Fourth party	Fifth party	Sixth party
Leader	Ivan Oman	France Bučar	Dušan Plut
Party	SKZ	SDZ	ZS
Alliance	DEMOS	DEMOS	DEMOS
Leader since	12 May 1988		October 1989
Seats before	New	New	New
Seats won	11	8	8
Popular vote	135,808	102,931	95,640
Percentage	12.55%	9.51%	8.84%
	Seventh party	Eighth party	Ninth party
Leader	Jože Pučnik	Viktor Žakelj	Vitomir Gros
Party	SDSS	SSS	SOS
Alliance	DEMOS		DEMOS
Leader since	24 November 1989	12 January 1990	1990
Seats before	New	New	New
Seats won	6	5	3
Popular vote	79,951	58,082	38,269
Percentage	7.39%	5.37%	3.54%
Prime Minister before election
Dušan Šinigoj
ZKS-SDP
Prime Minister after election
Lojze Peterle
SKD

Parliamentary elections were held in Slovenia on 8 April 1990, together with the first round of presidential elections.

They were the first direct, multiparty elections held in Slovenia since World War II, and the first multi-party elections held there since 1938. It was actually a transitional election leading to the country's first fully democratic election on 6 December 1992, by which time Slovenia had already gained its independence.

80 delegates were elected to the Sociopolitical Chamber and 80 delegates to the Chamber of Communes of the Assembly of the Socialist Republic of Slovenia.

On 12 April 1990, 80 delegates to the Chamber of Associated Labour were elected. More than 55% of the vote for the Sociopolitical Chamber went to the DEMOS coalition, formed by newly established parties of the Slovenian Spring. The United List of Social Democrats emerged as the largest party in the Sociopolitical Chamber, winning 14 seats.

In total 1,490,136 people had the right to vote and 1,241,212 of them (83.3%) participated, of which 1,238,189 people actually cast their ballots.

== Results ==
=== Socio-Political Chamber ===
Party	Votes	%	Seats
Party of Democratic Renewal	186,928	17.28	14
Alliance of Socialist Youth of Slovenia	156,843	14.49	12
Slovene Christian Democrats	140,403	12.98	11
Slovenian Peasant Union	135,808	12.55	11
Slovenian Democratic Union	102,931	9.51	8
Greens of Slovenia	95,640	8.84	8
Social Democratic Party of Slovenia	79,951	7.39	6
Socialist Alliance of Slovenia	58,082	5.37	5
Slovenian Crafts Entrepreneurship Party	38,269	3.54	3
League for Citizens' Equality	26,629	2.46	0
Civic Green List	21,583	1.99	0
Slovenian Handicraft and Business Party	17,021	1.57	0
New Social Movement	5,276	0.49	0
List of Single Candidates	4,715	0.44	0
List of Independents	4,618	0.43	0
Alliance of Retired Societies of Maribor	4,113	0.38	0
Democratic Alliance of Kosovo	3,240	0.30	0
Minority representatives			2
Total	1,082,050	100.00	80
Valid votes	1,128,435	91.14	
Invalid/blank votes	109,754	8.86	
Total votes	1,238,189	100.00	
Registered voters/turnout	1,490,136	83.09	
Source: Nohlen & Stöver, Delo

=== Chamber of Associated Labour ===
Party	Votes	%	Seats
DEMOS			29
Alliance of Socialist Youth of Slovenia			9
Party of Democratic Renewal			5
Socialist Alliance of Slovenia			3
Businesses, Societies, Associations and Army representatives			20
Chamber of Commerce and Industry representatives			7
Trade Unions representatives			7
Total			80
Valid votes	691,898	93.88	
Invalid/blank votes	45,128	6.12	
Total votes	737,026	100.00	
Registered voters/turnout	992,922	74.23	
Source: Nohlen & Stöver

=== Chamber of Communes ===
Party	First round		Second round		Seats
Party	Votes	%	Votes	%	Seats
DEMOS					51
Alliance of Socialist Youth of Slovenia					16
Party of Democratic Renewal					5
Socialist Alliance of Slovenia					5
Local communities representative					1
Hungarian minority representative					1
Italian minority representative					1
Total					80
Valid votes	1,428,789	94.37	1,155,302	95.10	
Invalid/blank votes	85,240	5.63	59,533	4.90	
Total votes	1,514,029	100.00	1,214,835	100.00	
Registered voters/turnout	1,853,908	81.67	1,602,297	75.82	
Source: Nohlen & Stöver
