= Aljaz Gosnar =

Slovenian diplomat (born 1952)

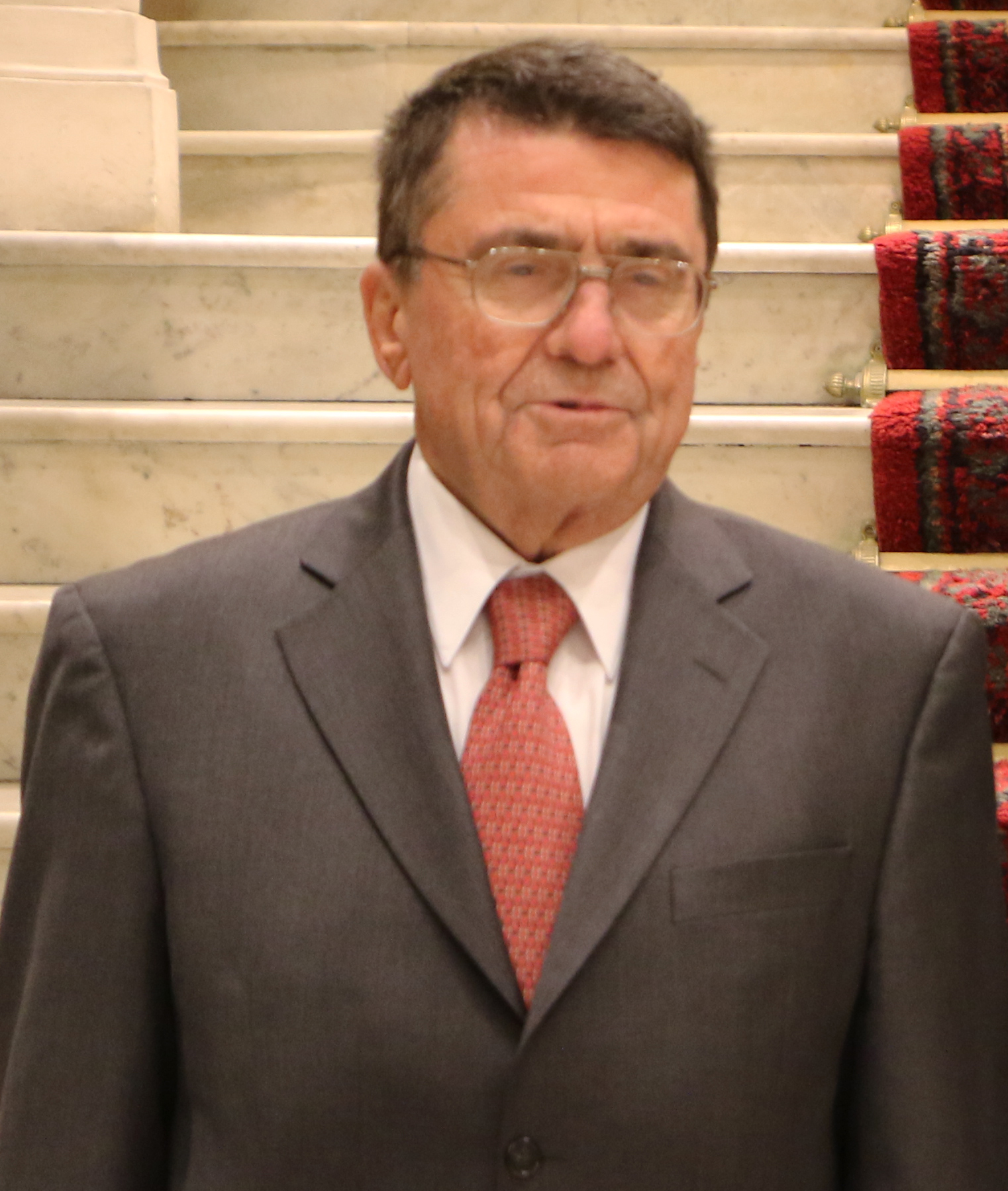
Gosnar in 2015

Aljaz Gosnar (born 1952) is a retired Slovenian diplomat. He was Secretary General of the Slovenian Ministry of Foreign Affairs from 2006 to 2011, with an interruption in 2008 when he served as the Secretary General of the Slovenian Presidency of the European Union. He was the Slovenian Ambassador to Madrid, Algiers and Andorra from 2012 to 2016, Ambassador, Permanent Representative to the United Nations and World Trade Organization in Geneva from 2001 to 2006, and the Chargé d'Affaires in Canberra from 1993 to 1997. During his career he was national coordinator of the Slovenian membership to the United Nations Security Council from 1989 to 1999, Head of the Minister's cabinet and Head of the Multilateral Relations department. He also served as diplomat in ex-Yugoslav Embassies in Guyana and Panama. Since his retirement in 2017, he has been assisting and promoting the economic relations between Slovenia and Spain in cooperation with the Chamber of Commerce of Gipuzkoa in Spain. He is also co-founder and member of the board of Slovenian Global Business Network. He holds a degree of Bachelor of Laws.
