= Signatories to the Treaty establishing a Constitution for Europe =

The Treaty establishing a Constitution for Europe was signed in Rome on 29 October 2004 by 53 senior political figures from the 25 member states of the European Union. In most cases heads of state designated plenipotentiaries to sign the treaty, but some presidents also signed on behalf of states which were republics. Most designated plenipotentiaries were prime ministers and foreign ministers.

== List of signatories ==
- For President Heinz Fischer of Austria:
  - Wolfgang Schüssel, Chancellor
  - Ursula Plassnik, Minister for Foreign Affairs
- For King Albert II of Belgium:
  - Guy Verhofstadt, Prime Minister
  - Karel De Gucht, Minister for Foreign Affairs
- For President Tassos Papadopoulos of Cyprus:
  - Tassos Papadopoulos, President
  - George Iacovou, Minister for Foreign Affairs
- For President Václav Klaus of the Czech Republic:
  - Stanislav Gross, Prime Minister
  - Cyril Svoboda, Minister for Foreign Affairs
- For Queen Margrethe II of Denmark:
  - Anders Fogh Rasmussen, Prime Minister
  - Per Stig Møller, Minister for Foreign Affairs
- For President Arnold Rüütel of Estonia:
  - Juhan Parts, Prime Minister
  - Kristiina Ojuland, Minister for Foreign Affairs
- For President Tarja Halonen of Finland:
  - Matti Vanhanen, Prime Minister
  - Erkki Tuomioja, Minister for Foreign Affairs
- For President Jacques Chirac of France:
  - Jacques Chirac, President
  - Jean-Pierre Raffarin, Prime Minister
  - Michel Barnier, Minister of Foreign Affairs
- For President Horst Köhler of Germany:
  - Gerhard Schröder, Chancellor
  - Joschka Fischer, Minister of Foreign Affairs and Deputy Chancellor
- For President Costis Stephanopoulos of Greece:
  - Kostas Karamanlis, Prime Minister
  - Petros Molyviatis, Minister of Foreign Affairs
- For President Ferenc Mádl of Hungary:
  - Ferenc Gyurcsány, Prime Minister
  - László Kovács, Minister for Foreign Affairs
- For President Mary McAleese of Ireland:
  - Bertie Ahern, Taoiseach
  - Dermot Ahern, Minister for Foreign Affairs
- For President Carlo Azeglio Ciampi of Italy:
  - Silvio Berlusconi, Prime Minister
  - Franco Frattini, Minister for Foreign Affairs
- For President Vaira Vīķe-Freiberga of Latvia:
  - Vaira Vīķe-Freiberga, President
  - Indulis Emsis, Prime Minister
  - Artis Pabriks, Minister for Foreign Affairs
- For President Valdas Adamkus of Lithuania:
  - Valdas Adamkus, President
  - Algirdas Mykolas Brazauskas, Prime Minister
  - Antanas Valionis, Minister of Foreign Affairs
- For Grand Duke Henri of Luxembourg:
  - Jean-Claude Juncker, Prime Minister
  - Jean Asselborn, Deputy Prime Minister and Minister for Foreign Affairs and Immigration
- For President Eddie Fenech Adami of Malta:
  - Lawrence Gonzi, Prime Minister
  - Michael Frendo, Minister for Foreign Affairs
- For Queen Beatrix of the Netherlands:
  - Jan Peter Balkenende, Prime Minister
  - Bernard Bot, Minister for Foreign Affairs
- For President Aleksander Kwaśniewski of Poland:
  - Marek Belka, Prime Minister
  - Włodzimierz Cimoszewicz, Minister for Foreign Affairs
- For President Jorge Sampaio of Portugal:
  - Pedro Miguel de Santana Lopes, Prime Minister
  - António Victor Martins Monteiro, Minister for Foreign Affairs and the Portuguese Communities
- For President Ivan Gašparovič of Slovakia:
  - Mikuláš Dzurinda, Prime Minister
  - Eduard Kukan, Minister for Foreign Affairs
- For President Janez Drnovšek of Slovenia:
  - Anton Rop, Prime Minister
  - Ivo Vajgl, Minister for Foreign Affairs
- For King Juan Carlos I of Spain:
  - José Luis Rodríguez Zapatero, President of the Government
  - Miguel Ángel Moratinos Cuyaubé, Minister for External Affairs and Cooperation
- For the Government of the Kingdom of Sweden:
  - Göran Persson, Prime Minister
  - Laila Freivalds, Minister for Foreign Affairs
- For Queen Elizabeth II of the United Kingdom:
  - Tony Blair, Prime Minister
  - Jack Straw, Secretary of State for Foreign and Commonwealth Affairs

== Candidate countries ==
Representatives of three candidate countries also signed the Final Act of the treaty as observers.

- From Bulgaria:
  - Simeon Saxe-Coburg-Gotha, Prime Minister
  - Solomon Passy, Minister for Foreign Affairs
- From Romania:
  - Ion Iliescu, President
  - Mircea Geoană, Minister for Foreign Affairs
- From Turkey:
  - Recep Tayyip Erdoğan, Prime Minister
  - Abdullah Gül, Minister for Foreign Affairs

Croatian representatives attended the ceremony but did not sign.
