= Ministry of Foreign and European Affairs (Slovenia) =

Government ministry of Slovenia

Coordinates: 46°3′5.99″N 14°29′53.05″E

Ministry of Foreign and European Affairs of Slovenia
- Ministrstvo za zunanje in evropske zadeve
- Coat of arms of Slovenia

Agency overview
- Formed: 1991
- Jurisdiction: Government of Slovenia
- Headquarters: Mladika Building, Ljubljana
- Agency executive: Tone Kajzer, Minister of Foreign and European Affairs
- Website: http://www.mzz.gov.si/en

The Ministry of Foreign and European Affairs (Slovene: Ministrstvo za zunanje in evropske zadeve; MZEZ) of the Republic of Slovenia is an executive department of the Government of Slovenia responsible for relations with other countries and international organisations, monitoring of the international political and economic situation, and strengthening of Slovenia's relations with other countries and international organisations. The ministry headquarters is located in the capital city of Ljubljana.

The current Minister of Foreign Affairs, Tone Kajzer, has served since 4 June 2026.

The current name of the Ministry has been used since 24 January 2023, prior to which it was called the Ministry of Foreign Affairs (abbreviated MZZ).

== Organisation ==
=== Executive ===
The Chief Executive Officer of the Ministry is Minister of Foreign Affairs, who is a member of the Cabinet and answers to the Prime Minister and the National Assembly. Current Minister of Foreign Affairs is Tone Kajzer of the Slovenian Democratic Party.

Minister is assisted by two State Secretaries, one of which is usually responsible for EU Affairs. Current State Secretaries are Gašper Dovžan (responsible for EU Affairs) and Stanislav Raščan (responsible for development and other affairs). While the minister is a typical political position, State Secretaries are usually chosen among career diplomats within the ministry.

=== Internal service ===
The ministry consists of the Minister's Cabinet, Secretariat, and five political directorates. Head of Cabinet is Mihael Zupančič. Secretariat is headed by the Secretary-General Ambassador Jožef Drofenik.

Directorates and departments within them are:

- Directorate for Common Foreign and Security Policy (Director-General and Political Director Jernej Müller);
  - Department for Security Policy
  - Department for Strategic Studies and Analyses
  - Department for North and Latin America and the Caribbean
  - Department for Africa and the Middle East
  - Department for Asia and Oceania
  - Department for Eastern Europe, South Caucasus, Central Asia and the Arctic
  - Department for Enlargement and South-Eastern Europe
  - Department for the Bled Strategic Forum
- Directorate for European Union Affairs (Director-General Ambassador Barbara Sušnik);
  - Department for European Affairs
  - Department for European Countries
  - Department for General and Institutional Affairs
  - Department for Neighbouring Countries
- Directorate for Multilateral Affairs and Development Cooperation (Acting Director-General Igor Jukič);
  - Department for International Organisations
  - Human Rights Department
  - Department for Development Cooperation and Humanitarian Assistance
- Directorate for Economic and Public Diplomacy (Acting Director-General Slobodan Šešum); and
  - Department for Bilateral Economic Cooperation I
  - Department for Bilateral Economic Cooperation II
  - Department for Public Diplomacy and International Cooperation in Culture
- Directorate for International Law and Protection of Interests (Director-General Marko Rakovec).
  - International Law Department
  - Diplomatic Protocol
  - Consular Department
  - Department for Borders and Succession Issues

Cabinet of the Minister consists of:

- Strategic Communication Service
- Service for Cooperation with the Government and the National Assembly
- Internal Audit Service
- Diplomatic Supervisor
- Diplomatic academy

Secretariat consists of:

- Information Technology Service
- Personnel Service
- Accounting and Finance Service
- Documentation and Classified Information Service
- Legal Affairs And Public Procurement Service
- Property Management Service
- Logistics and Security Service

=== External service ===
Slovenia operates several diplomatic representations and consular posts. There are 42 embassies (one of them non-residential), 7 permanent missions to international organizations, 5 Consulates General, 1 representative office, and 3 consulates. Slovenia also has several honorary consuls.

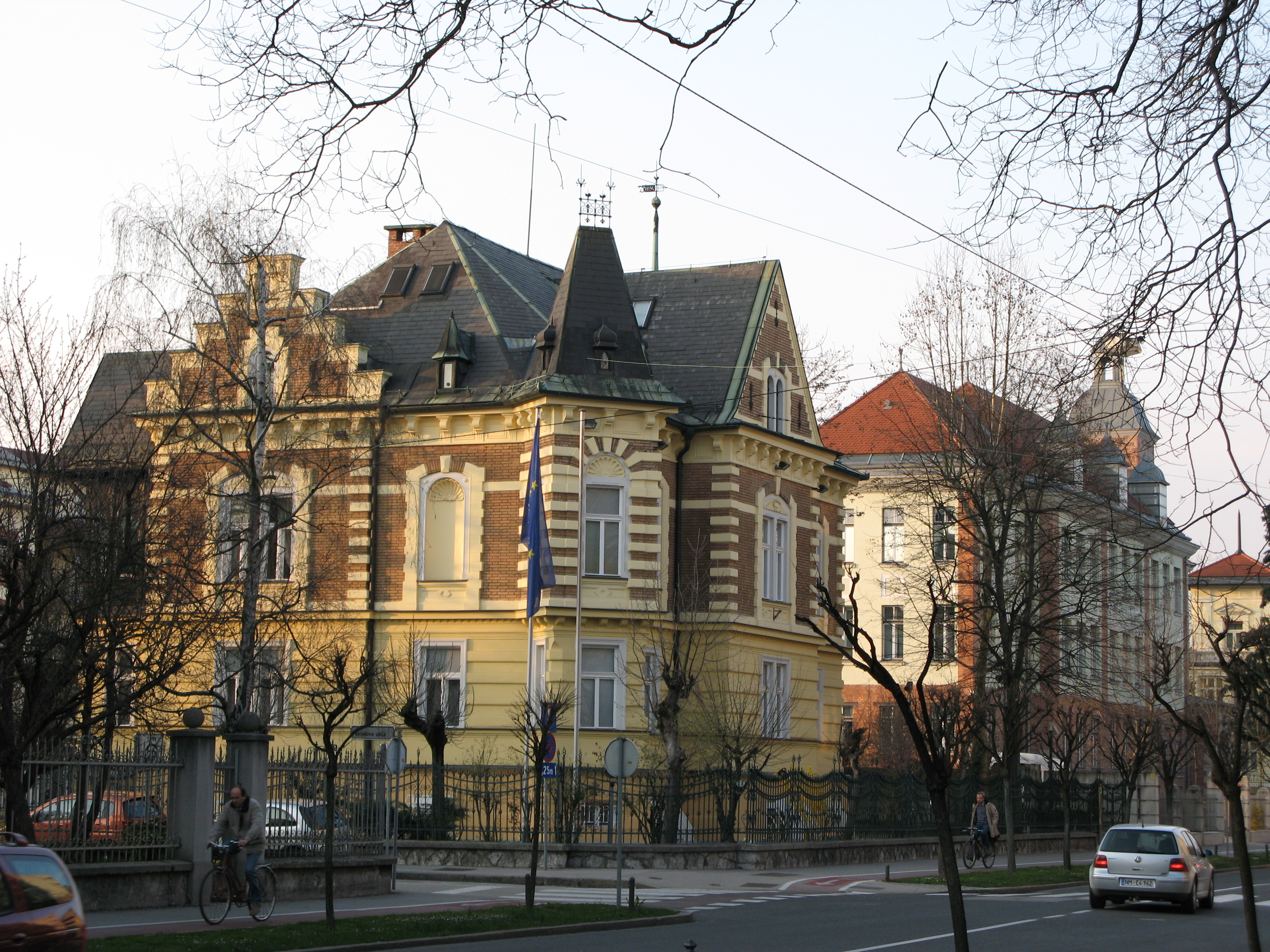
The Mladika Complex (in the back) houses part of the offices of the Ministry. In front of it stands the villa of the Austrian Embassy in Ljubljana.

== Ministers ==
| Image | Minister | Start of term | End of term |
|---|---|---|---|
| | Dimitrij Rupel | May 1990 | January 1993 |
| | Lojze Peterle | January 25, 1993 | October 31, 1994 |
| | Zoran Thaler | 26 January 1995 | 16 May 1996 |
| | Davorin Kračun | July 19, 1996 | January 1997 |
| | Zoran Thaler | February 27, 1997 | September 25, 1997 |
| | Boris Frlec | September 25, 1997 | February 2, 2000 |
| | Dimitrij Rupel | February 2, 2000 | May 2000 |
| | Lojze Peterle | June 7, 2000 | November 30, 2000 |
| | Dimitrij Rupel | December 2000 | July 2004 |
| | Ivo Vajgl | July 6, 2004 | December 3, 2004 |
| | Dimitrij Rupel | December 3, 2004 | October 2008 |
| | Samuel Žbogar | November 2008 | February 2012 |
| | Karl Erjavec | February 2012 | September 2018 |
| | Miro Cerar | September 2018 | March 2020 |
| | Anže Logar | March 2020 | June 2022 |
| | Tanja Fajon | June 2022 | June 2026 |
| | Tone Kajzer | June 2026 | |

== See also ==
- Foreign relations of Slovenia
