= European of the Year (European Voice award) =

The Europeans of the Year award was established in 2001 by European Voice to honour influential European citizens who have mostly affected the European legislative and policy agenda. The annual award is officially supported by the Belgian Prime Minister Guy Verhofstadt. Every year, senior editors of European Voice and a panel of advisors from the European Community select 50 people who have had most influence on the European legislative and policy agenda in the past year. The list includes European Commissioners, MEPs, heads of state, politicians, EU functionaries, NGOs, campaigners and European citizens. Following a public poll, the results of which are announced at a gala dinner, the winners in different categories receive the "Europeans of the Year" awards.

Year	Winner	Comment
2001	(Republic of Ireland) Bono	U2 lead singer.
2002	(Italy) Marco Cappato	Italian MEP
2003	(Slovenia) Lojze Peterle	Slovenian MEP
2004	(Turkey) Recep Tayyip Erdogan	prime minister of Turkey
2005	(Luxembourg) Jean-Claude Juncker	prime minister of Luxembourg
2006	(Portugal) José Manuel Barroso	European commission president
2007	(Lithuania) Valdas Adamkus	President of Lithuania
2008	(Bulgaria) Meglena Kuneva	European commissioner for consumer protection
2009		
2010	(Bulgaria) Kristalina Georgieva	European Commissioner for international co-operation, humanitarian aid and crisis response
2011	Henrik, Prince Consort of Denmark	
2012		
2013		
