= Čužnja Vas =

- Location in Slovenia
- Coordinates: 45°54′34.77″N 15°12′3.86″E
- Country: Slovenia
- Traditional region: Lower Carniola
- Statistical region: Southeast Slovenia
- Municipality: Mokronog-Trebelno

Area
  - Total: 4.25 km^{2} (1.64 sq mi)
- Elevation: 457.2 m (1,500 ft)

Population (2002)
  - Total: 90

Čužnja Vas (pronounced [ˈtʃuːʒnja ˈʋaːs]; Slovene: Čužnja vas) is a village in the hills southeast of Mokronog in the Municipality of Mokronog-Trebelno in southeastern Slovenia. The area is part of the historical region of Lower Carniola and is now included in the Southeast Slovenia Statistical Region. The village includes the hamlets of Jerenga, Sela, and Zapadeži.

== Name ==
The name of the village was first recorded in 1484 as Zissendorf (and as Zisseldorf in 1485, and Czhushndorf or Czuschendorff in 1763–87). The name is believed to derive from the personal name or nickname *Čuž, thus meaning 'Čuž's village'. The nickname *Čuž may refer to the screech owl or may be a derogatory reference to Croats, among various possibilities.

== History ==
Hallstatt burial mounds at the Osredek fallows near the village show that the area was already inhabited in prehistoric times. Prehistoric graves have also been found in fields and vineyards in the hamlet of Jerenga.

=== Mass grave ===
Čužnja Vas is the site of a mass grave and a clandestine grave associated with the Second World War. The Lukovnik 1 Mass Grave (Slovene: Grobišče Lukovnik 1) and the Lukovnik 2 Grave (Grobišče Lukovnik 2) are located north of the settlement. The first grave lies in a wooded area 50 meters (160 ft) from the bridge across Lukovnik Creek, in a V-shaped area where two forest paths meet. It contains the remains of 20 civilians murdered by the Partisan Lower Carniola Detachment in spring and summer 1942. The second grave lies 10 meters (33 ft) from the junction of the paths, below a large hornbeam. A young Partisan soldier is buried there.

== Notable people ==
Notable people that were born or lived in Čužnja Vas include:

- Lojze Peterle (born 1948), Slovene politician and first prime minister of Slovenia
