= Tone Kajzer =

Slovenian diplomat (born 1966)

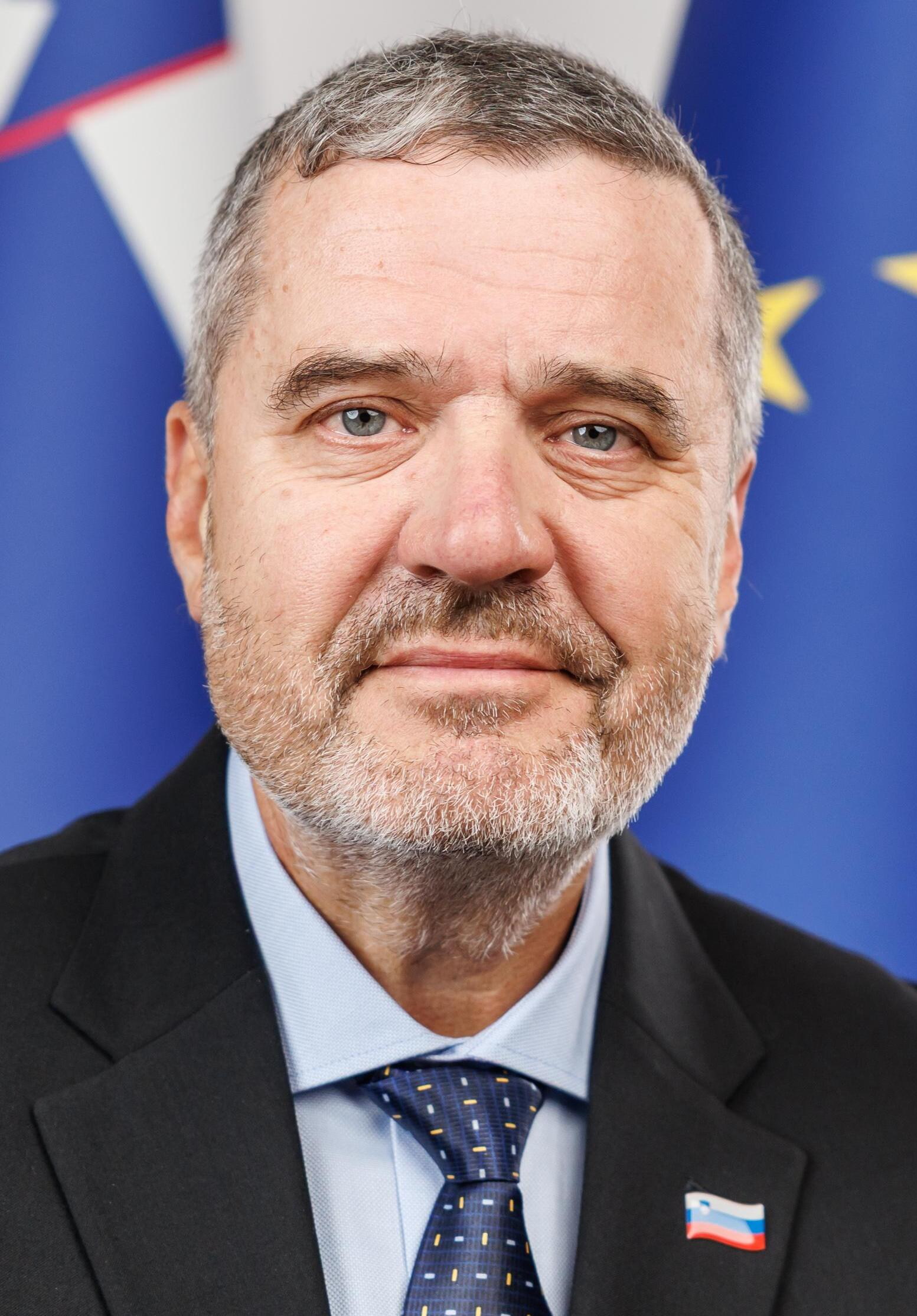
- Official portrait, 2026

Minister of Foreign and European Affairs
- Incumbent
- Assumed office 4 June 2026
- Prime Minister: Janez Janša
- Preceded by: Tanja Fajon

Personal details
- Born: 9 July 1966 (age 60) Slovenj Gradec, Slovenia
- Party: Slovenian Democratic Party
- Spouse: Milena Stefanović Kajzer
- Children: 2
- Education: University of Ljubljana; University of Maribor

Tone Kajzer (born 9 July 1966) is a Slovenian diplomat who has served as Minister of Foreign and European Affairs since 2026.

He previously served as State Secretary at the Ministry of Foreign Affairs. He is a former Slovenian ambassador to Finland and later Denmark, and between 2020 and 2022 he served as ambassador to the United States.

== Early life and education ==
Kajzer was born on 9 July 1966 in Slovenj Gradec. He grew up in Mežica, where he attended primary school. He later attended the Secondary School of Civil Engineering in Maribor, intending to pursue a career as a surveyor in the Mežica mine. He later studied geodesy at the Faculty of Architecture, Civil Engineering and Geodesy in Ljubljana before enrolling at the Faculty of Economics and Business in Maribor. He subsequently specialized in international relations at the Faculty of Social Sciences in Ljubljana. He joined Slovenia's Ministry of Foreign Affairs in 1995.

== Diplomatic career ==
Kajzer began his diplomatic career at the Slovenian Embassy in Egypt, where he served from 1996 to 2000. After returning to Ljubljana, he held several positions at the Ministry of Foreign Affairs, including work in international development cooperation and on unresolved bilateral issues between Slovenia and Croatia.

In 2008, Kajzer was appointed Slovenia's ambassador to Finland and Estonia. He remained in the post until 2012, when Slovenia closed its embassy in Finland as part of government cost-cutting measures. He subsequently served as State Secretary in the Office of Prime Minister Janez Janša. From 2013 to 2018, Kajzer served as Slovenia's ambassador to Denmark, with additional responsibility for several Nordic and Baltic countries.

In November 2020, he was appointed Slovenia's ambassador to the United States.

=== Recall from the United States ===
Kajzer's ambassadorship ended controversially in 2022. In September of that year, he photographed a confidential diplomatic cable from Minister Tanja Fajon, concerning the collection of signatures for Nataša Pirc Musar's presidential candidacy and sent the photograph to Janez Janša, who subsequently published it on Twitter.

The Slovenian government proposed Kajzer's recall, alleging that he had improperly used the diplomatic cable system. President Borut Pahor signed the recall order on 20 September 2022, while publicly expressing reservations about the severity of the measure and arguing that Kajzer's actions had not directly harmed Slovenia's foreign-policy interests.

=== Minister of Foreign and European Affairs ===
On 4 June 2026, Kajzer was appointed Minister of Foreign and European Affairs in the 16th Government of Slovenia. Upon taking office, Kajzer emphasized strengthening Slovenia's position within the European Union and NATO, as well as supporting further EU and NATO enlargement in the Western Balkans.

== Personal life ==
Kajzer is married to Milena Stefanović Kajzer, also a career diplomat, and they have two children. He enjoys reading and golf.
