= Dušan Šinigoj =

Slovenian politician (1933–2024)

- Born: November 7, 1933; Dorimbergo, Italy (now Slovenia)
- Died: August 18, 2024 (aged 90)
- Occupation: Politician

Dušan Šinigoj (November 7, 1933 – August 18, 2024) was a Slovene communist politician.

Šinigoj was born in Dorimbergo, Italy (now Dornberk, Slovenia). He graduated from the University of Ljubljana's Faculty of Economics in 1959 and then taught and worked as a school principal. In 1969, he became the municipal secretary of the League of Communists of Slovenia in Nova Gorica, and in 1973 he became a member of the executive committee of the Socialist Alliance of the Working People of Slovenia in Ljubljana. In 1978 he became the vice-president of the Executive Council of the Assembly of the Socialist Republic of Slovenia, and in May 1984 its president. Šinigoj served as the president of the Executive Council of the Socialist Republic of Slovenia from May 23, 1984, to May 16, 1990. He was a member of the League of Communists of Slovenia and the Party of Democratic Renewal. He was preceded by Janez Zemljarič and succeeded by Lojze Peterle following the first direct multiparty elections held in Slovenia since World War II.

After handing over government affairs to Lojze Peterle, Šinigoj was the director of a bank in Nova Gorica until 1993.
