= Ivo Vajgl =

Slovenian politician

Ivo Vajgl MEP
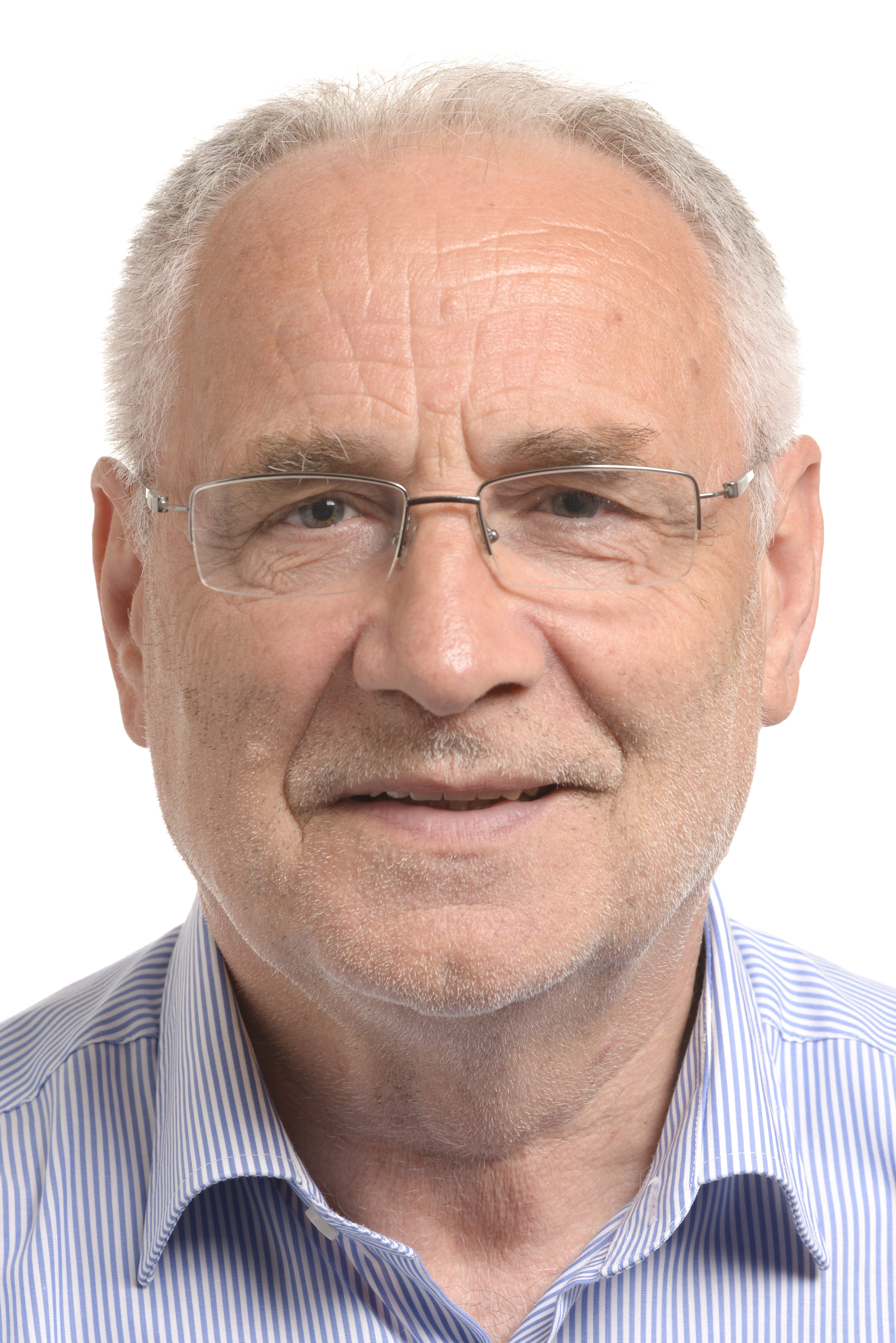

Member of the European Parliament
- In office 1 July 2009 – 15 July 2019
- Constituency: Slovenia

Minister of Foreign Affairs
- In office 6 July 2004 – 3 December 2004
- Prime Minister: Anton Rop
- Preceded by: Dimitrij Rupel
- Succeeded by: Dimitrij Rupel

Personal details
- Born: 3 March 1943 (age 83) Maribor, Slovenia
- Party: Slovenia; Independent; EU; European Democratic Party
- Spouse: Mojca Zlobko Vajgl (2000 - present)
- Children: Sergej, Uroš, Jan
- Education: University of Ljubljana
- Awards: Creu de Sant Jordi

Ivo Vajgl (born 3 March 1943) is a Slovenian politician and former Member of the European Parliament (MEP) from Slovenia. In his second term in the European Parliament he was a member of DeSUS and an individual member of the European Democratic Party (EDP), while in the European Parliament he was a member of the ALDE Group. He has announced his candidacy in the 2022 Slovenian presidential election.

== Political career ==
Born in Maribor, he attended the University of Ljubljana. He was appointed foreign minister by Prime Minister Anton Rop on 6 July 2004, replacing Dimitrij Rupel, who left the Liberal Democracy of Slovenia (LDS) party to join the opposition Slovenian Democratic Party. Vajgl's tenure ended on 3 December 2004 with Rupel's reappointment to the position in the new administration of Janez Janša, formed after the 2004 elections to the National Assembly, which were held on 3 October.

As foreign minister, Vajgl joined Rop in signing the Treaty establishing a Constitution for Europe in Rome on 29 October 2004. Between 2004 and 2007, Vajgl worked as the advisor for foreign policy in the cabinet of President of Slovenia Janez Drnovšek. From the mid-1990s to 2007, Vajgl was a member of the LDS party. In 2007, Vajgl left the LDS party and joined the newly formed party Zares. In 2008, as a member of the Zares party, he was elected to the National Assembly of the Republic of Slovenia and became the Chairman of the Foreign Policy Committee.

From 1992 to 1996, he was the Slovenian Ambassador to Sweden as well as all the Nordic and Baltic countries. From 1998 to 2002, he was Slovenian Ambassador to Austria and head of the Slovenian Mission to the OSCE in Vienna. His last post as Slovenian Ambassador took him again to the German Capital, this time Berlin, from 2002 to 2004.

In the 2009 European Parliament elections, Ivo Vajgl headed the list of seven candidates for the party Zares. On 7 June 2009 he was elected a Member of the European Parliament with 9.77% of the vote and 21,031 preferential votes.

In the 2014 European Parliament elections, Ivo Vajgl was elected on the list of the DeSUS party with 8.12% of the vote and 21,569 preferential votes.

Vajgl is an art lover. He speaks English, German, Italian, French, and Serbian.
