= Dimitrij Rupel =

Slovenian politician (born 1946)

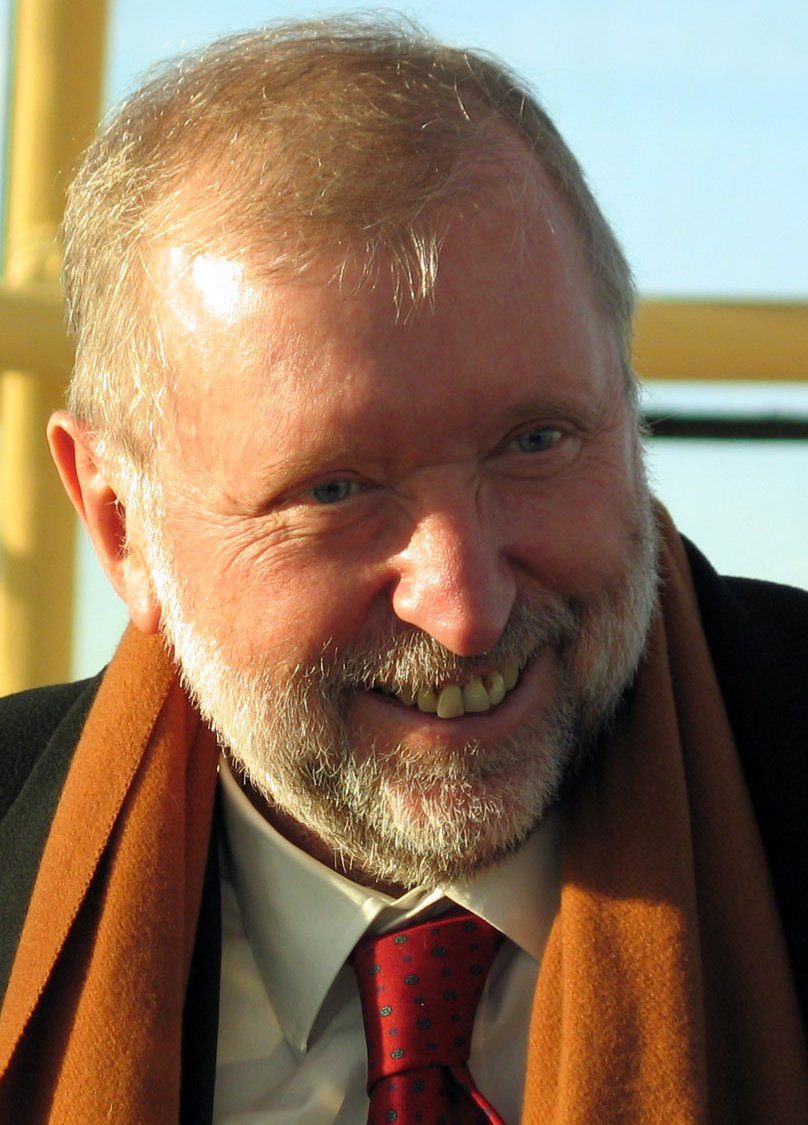

Personal details
- Born: 7 April 1946 (age 80) Ljubljana, PR Slovenia, Yugoslavia
- Party: Slovene Democratic

Dimitrij Rupel (born 7 April 1946) is a Slovenian politician.

== Early life and education ==
Rupel was born in Ljubljana, in what was then the PR Slovenia, into a bourgeois family of former anti-fascist political emigrants from the Julian March (his grandfather was the last Slovene mayor of Duino in Austria-Hungary).

After receiving a bachelor's degree in comparative literature and sociology from the University of Ljubljana in 1970, he continued his studies at the University of Essex, and Brandeis University where he obtained a PhD in sociology in 1976. During this time, he published literary works, journalistic and critical articles, and worked as a translator and editor. From 1977 to 1978, he taught at Queen's University in Canada, then in 1985 at the New School for Social Research of New York and at Cleveland State University in 1989.

== Career ==
=== Career in national politics ===
Together with other Slovene intellectuals in the 1980s, initiated and edited the alternative and dissident journal Nova Revija, which later became the platform for democratic reform in the Socialist Republic of Slovenia.

In 1987, he was among the authors of the Contributions to the Slovenian National Program, an intellectual manifesto that demanded a democratic, pluralistic and sovereign Slovenian state. The publication of the manifesto by the journal Nova revija, edited by Rupel, caused a huge scandal in Yugoslavia, and Rupel was forced to step down as editor. In 1989, he was one of the founders of the Slovenian Democratic Union (Slovenska demokratična zveza, SDZ), one of the first parties that opposed Communist rule.

After the victory of the anti-Communist DEMOS coalition in the first free elections in Slovenia in 1990, Rupel was appointed as State Secretary for International Cooperation in the cabinet of Lojze Peterle, thus becoming de facto the first foreign minister of the Republic of Slovenia, which was then seeking independence from Yugoslavia. During his term in office, Slovenia declared its independence and gained international recognition. Rupel also remained in office during the first centre-left coalition government led by Janez Drnovšek.

In 1991, the Slovenian Democratic Union suffered an internal split: Rupel led its left-wing fraction, formed among others by Jelko Kacin, Igor Bavčar, and France Bučar, into the formation of a new party, called the Democratic Party. The same year, he was elected its president. In the elections of 1992, the new party suffered a defeat, but Rupel managed to be elected a representative in the National Assembly of Slovenia. In 1994, most of Rupel's party merged into the Liberal Democracy of Slovenia party, led by Janez Drnovšek. In 1994, he ran for mayor of Ljubljana and took office in 1995. He remained in this position until 1997, when he was appointed ambassador to the United States.

Rupel returned to the post of the foreign minister of Slovenia in 2000 in the third cabinet of Janez Drnovšek. He remained in this position until July 2004, when Prime Minister Anton Rop replaced him with Ivo Vajgl. He returned to his seat in parliament, left the Liberal Democracy of Slovenia party, and joined the opposition Slovenian Democratic Party. In October 2004, this party won the election and Rupel became foreign minister in Janez Janša's centre-right government when it was approved by parliament on 3 December 2004. After years of negotiations, disagreements and delays he signed the Agreement on Succession Issues of the Former Socialist Federal Republic of Yugoslavia on behalf of Slovenia.

During 2005 he was the chairman-in-office of the OSCE.

In 2008, after the victory of the centre-left coalition led by Borut Pahor, Rupel was replaced as foreign minister by Samuel Žbogar. However, he was nominated by newly elected Prime Minister Borut Pahor as his personal Special Envoy for Foreign Affairs.

=== Later career ===
Rupel is a member of PEN, AAASS, the Slovenian Writer's Association, and the Association of Sociologists. In addition to Slovene, he speaks English, Croatian, German, Italian and French to varying degrees.

In 2017 Rupel was an international observer in the 2017 Catalan independence referendum.

In 2020, Rupel was one of the candidates for the post as Representative on Freedom of the Media of the Organization for Security and Co-operation in Europe (OSCE).

== Personal life ==
Rupel is the uncle of the Slovene pop-singer Anja Rupel.

He was married to Marjetica Ana Rudolf Rupel until her death in 2022. She was previously married to Slovenian singer Lado Leskovar. Her father was Janko Rudolf, Slovenian partisan, People's Hero and politician.

== See also ==
- Foreign relations of Slovenia

Political offices
Preceded by Position established	Minister of Foreign Affairs; 1990–1993	Succeeded by Lojze Peterle
Preceded by Jože Strgar	Mayor of Ljubljana; 1994–1998	Succeeded by Vika Potočnik
Preceded by Boris Frlec	Minister of Foreign Affairs; 2000	Succeeded by Lojze Peterle
Preceded by Lojze Peterle	Minister of Foreign Affairs; 2000–2004	Succeeded by Ivo Vajgl
Preceded by Ivo Vajgl	Minister of Foreign Affairs; 2004–2008	Succeeded by Samuel Žbogar
Preceded by Luís Amado	President of the Council of the European Union; 2008	Succeeded by Bernard Kouchner
