= Boris Frlec =

Slovenian politician (1936–2026)

Boris Frlec (10 February 1936 – 18 February 2026) was a Slovenian politician.

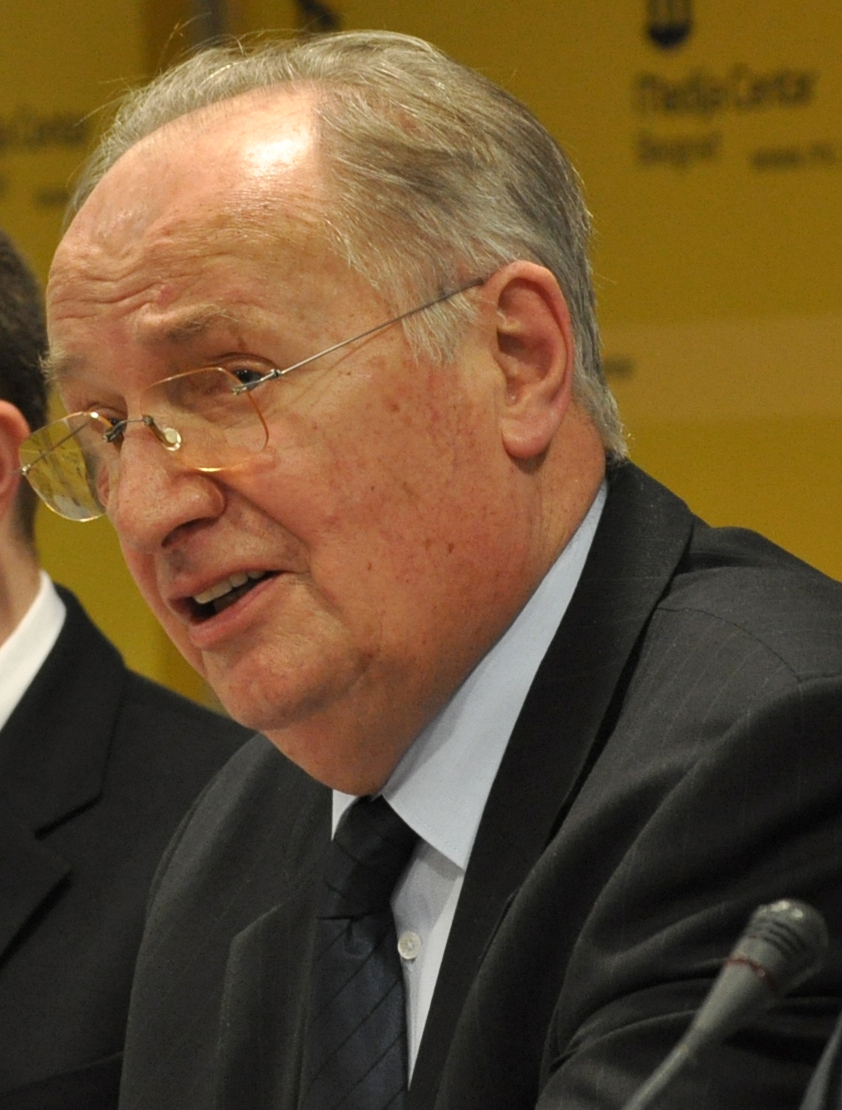
Frlec in 2014

== Life and career ==
Frlec was born in Ljubljana on 10 February 1936. He served as the minister of foreign affairs (1997–2000).

Frlec died on 18 February 2026, at the age of 90.

Political offices
Preceded by Zoran Thaler	Minister of Foreign Affairs; 1997–2000	Succeeded by Dimitrij Rupel
