= Damijan Šinigoj =

Slovenian writer (born 1964)

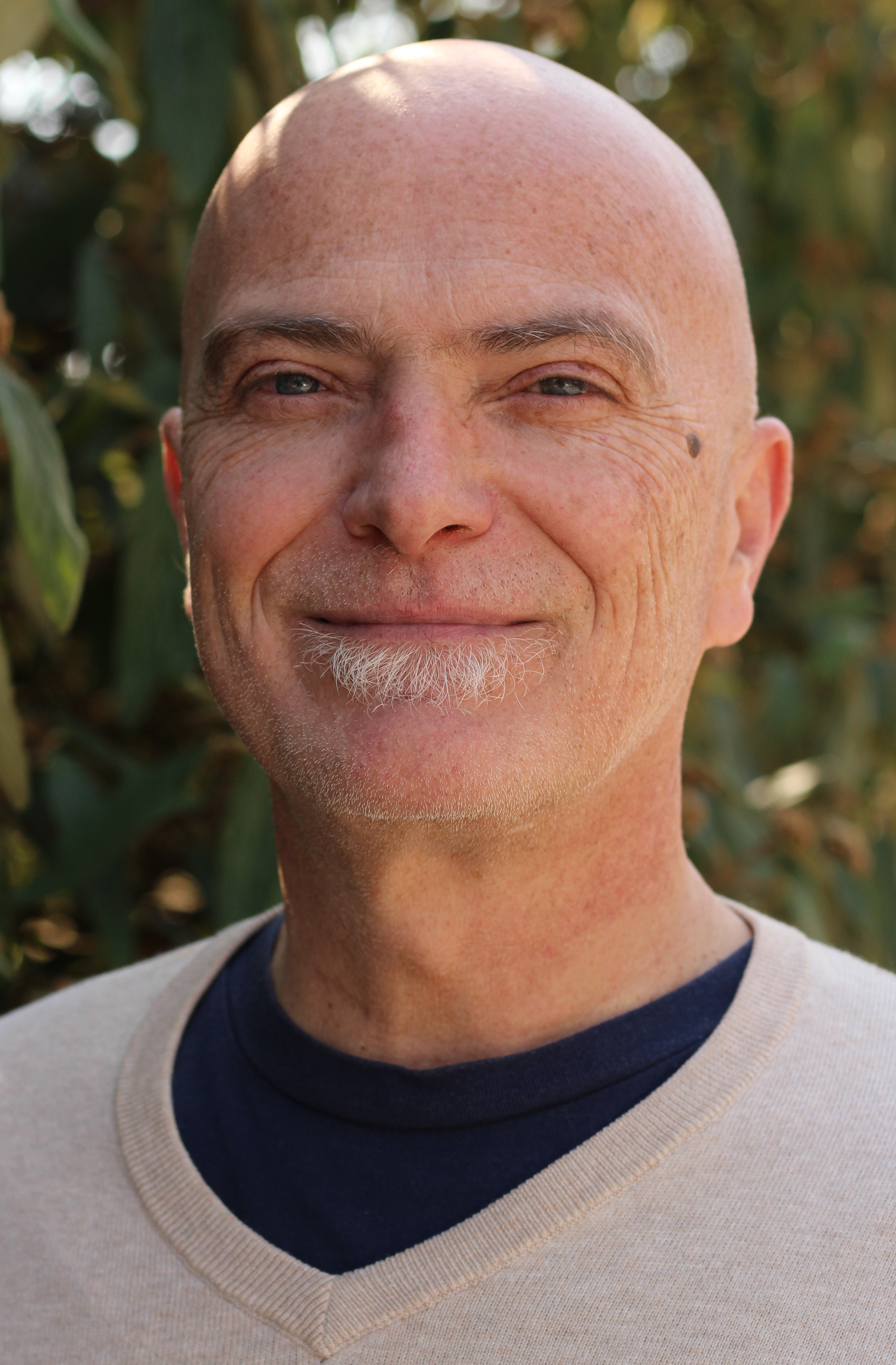
- Šinigoj in 2022
- Born: October 24, 1964 (age 61) Novo Mesto, Slovenia
- Language: Slovene

Website
- www.sinigoj.si

Damijan Šinigoj (born 1964 in Novo Mesto) is a Slovene writer, translator, editor, publicist and scriptwriter. He is a member of Slovene Writers' Association, Slovene Translators' Association, Chief editor at Novo mesto Magazine, chief editor at Jamar Magazine, chief editor at Naše jame Magazine. Columnist at MAMA magazine and many others.

He has written four novels, They Shoot The Soldiers, Don't They? (Amalietti, Ljubljana, 1991), Unfired Rounds (Amalietti & Slon, Ljubljana, 1994), "Looking for Eve" (Miš, Domžale, 2014), "Where the wind sleeps (Miš, Domžale, 2020)" and three collections of short stories Father's Cosy Nook (GOGA, Novo Mesto, 2003), “Short Diary of a Cave Addict” (GOGA, Novo mesto, 2012) and "The third child" (Novellish, Ljubljana, 2020). In 2000 he translated the novel Short Trip by Ratko Cvetnić from Croatian, in 2001 the novel Witness by Zilhad Ključanin from Bosnian, in 2003 the novel Surfacing by Veselin Marković from Serbian, and in 2006 Things I Kept Inside Me by Aleksandra Kardum from Croatian "End of the Century, Beginning of the Millennium", an anthology of Bosnian short story from Bosnian, "The girl on the road" by Goran Samardzic from Bosnian, "Ukulele jam" by Alan Mešković from Croatian. From his script in 2002 a documentary film “When The War Knocks” was filmed and a feature film "1991 – Unfired rounds" was made.
