= Lojze Peterle =

Prime Minister of Slovenia from 1991 to 1992

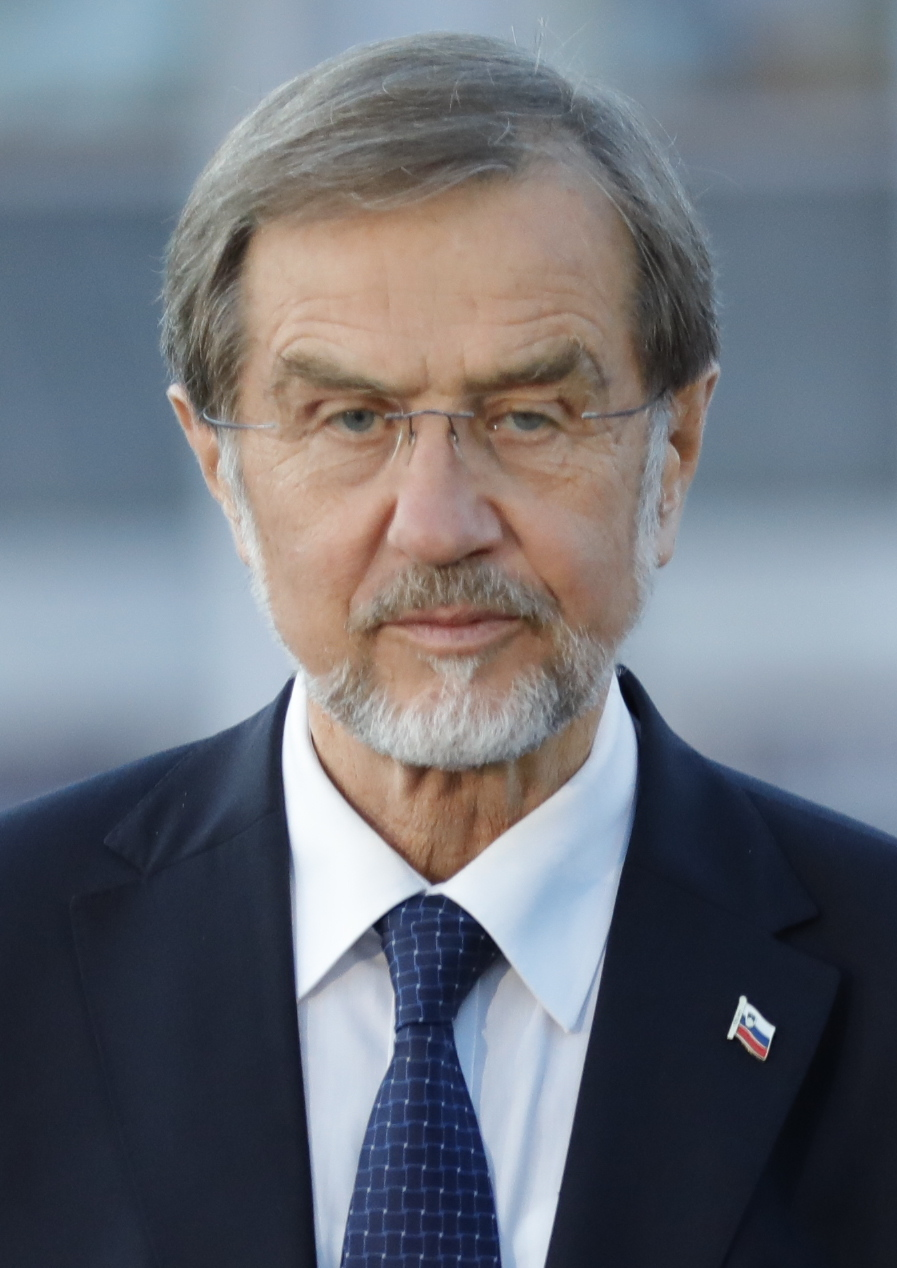
- Peterle in 2021

Prime Minister of Slovenia
- In office 23 December 1991 – 14 May 1992
- President: Milan Kučan
- Deputy: Andrej Ocvirk; Mitja Malešič; Leopold Šešerko
- Preceded by: Himself (as President of the Executive Council)
- Succeeded by: Janez Drnovšek

President of the Executive Council of Slovenia
- In office 16 May 1990 – 23 December 1991
- President: Milan Kučan
- Deputy: Jože Mencinger (until 1991); Andrej Ocvirk (from 1991); Mitja Malešič; Leopold Šešerko
- Preceded by: Dušan Šinigoj
- Succeeded by: Himself (as Prime Minister)

Minister of Foreign Affairs
- In office 7 June 2000 – 30 November 2000
- Prime Minister: Andrej Bajuk
- Preceded by: Dimitrij Rupel
- Succeeded by: Dimitrij Rupel
- In office 25 January 1993 – 31 October 1994
- Prime Minister: Janez Drnovšek
- Preceded by: Dimitrij Rupel
- Succeeded by: Zoran Thaler
Additional positions
Member of the European Parliament
In office 1 July 2004 – 2 July 2019
Constituency	Slovenia
Member of the National Assembly
In office 22 June 1996 – 1 July 2004
Leader of the Christian Democrats
In office 19 January 1990 – 14 April 2000
Deputy	Jože Mencinger
Preceded by	Office established
Succeeded by	Office abolished

Personal details
- Born: Alojz Peterle; 5 July 1948 (age 78) Čužnja Vas, PR Slovenia, FPR Yugoslavia
- Party: Independent
- Other political affiliations: Christian Democrats (Before 2000); People's Party (2000)
- Education: University of Ljubljana
- Website: www.peterle.eu

Alojz "Lojze" Peterle (born 5 July 1948) is a Slovenian politician. He is a member of New Slovenia, part of the European People's Party. He served as Prime Minister of Slovenia from 1990 to 1992, Leader of the Christian Democrats from the founding of the party in 1990 until it merged with the Slovenian People's Party in 2000, and was Minister of Foreign Affairs from 1993 to 1994 and again in 2000. He was a Member of the National Assembly from 1996 to 2004, and a Member of the European Parliament from 2004 to 2019.

== Early life and career ==
Lojze Peterle was born to a peasant family in the Lower Carniolan village of Čužnja Vas near Trebnje. He attended the Novo Mesto Grammar School. In 1967, he enrolled in the University of Ljubljana, where he studied history and geography, and later also economy. During his student years, he started collaborating with the Christian left intellectual circle around the journal Revija 2000.

In the 1980s, Peterle started working at the Institute for Urban Planning of the Socialist Republic of Slovenia. In the mid-1980s, he was involved in several projects of trans-regional cooperation within the Alpe-Adria regional cooperation network.

== Political career ==
=== Leader of the Christian Democrats, 1990–2000 ===
In 1990, he was elected president of the newly founded Slovene Christian Democrats.

Peterle became prime minister of Slovenia in May 1990 after parliamentary elections of April 1990 won by the DEMOS coalition (which included Christian Democrats and was created in opposition to the Communist rule). In 1991, the DEMOS-led Slovene Parliament declared the country's independence from Yugoslavia, in compliance with the result of a referendum held in December the previous year. He served as prime minister until May 1992, when due to an internal crisis in the DEMOS coalition, a new coalition government under Janez Drnovšek was established by a constructive vote of no confidence. In the elections of 1992, the Christian Democrats gained some support and became the second largest party in a highly fragmented National Assembly, after the Liberal Democratic Party. The Christian Democrats entered a cross-party coalition with the Liberal Democrats and the United List of Social Democrats (former Communist Party of Slovenia) under the leadership of Janez Drnovšek.

Peterle served as deputy prime minister and foreign minister from January 1993 until October 1994. Tensions were deep in the coalition, however, and Peterle resigned from his posts in 1994 when Drnovšek nominated Jožef Školč, a member of his own Liberal Democratic Party, to be speaker of Parliament, against the wishes of Peterle who believed that a Christian Democrat should be the speaker. The Christian Democrats did remain in the coalition, which was often divided over specific policy issues. In 1996, Peterle called for the dismissal of foreign minister Zoran Thaler because of his belief that Thaler did not do enough to help Slovenia's relations with Italy.

In the 1996 elections, Peterle's party suffered a decisive defeat, losing popular support to the other two centre-right parties, the Social Democratic Party of Slovenia and the Slovene People's Party, that had remained in the opposition and had criticised what they called a "unprincipled coalition between Christian Democracy and former Communists".

Between 1996 and 2000, the Christian Democrats remained in opposition, and Peterle's leadership was frequently challenged by different fractions within the party. He nevertheless managed to remain the chairman of the Party until 2000, when the Christian Democrats merged with the Slovenian People's Party, which had until then supported Janez Drnovšek's third term as prime minister. As a consequence, Drnovšek's government fell in 2000, and Peterle became foreign minister again in the short-lived centre-right government of Andrej Bajuk from June 2000 to November 2000.

=== After the 2000 election ===
Due to a disagreement over the election legislation, Peterle left the Slovene People's Party shortly after its unification with the Christian Democrats and joined the newly founded New Slovenia – Christian People's Party. In the 2000 election, both of Slovenia's conservative and christian democratic parties suffered a defeat against Drnovšek's Liberal Democracy of Slovenia, while the Slovenian Social Democratic Party assumed the undisputed leadership of the centre-right opposition.

=== Member of the European Parliament, 2004–2019 ===
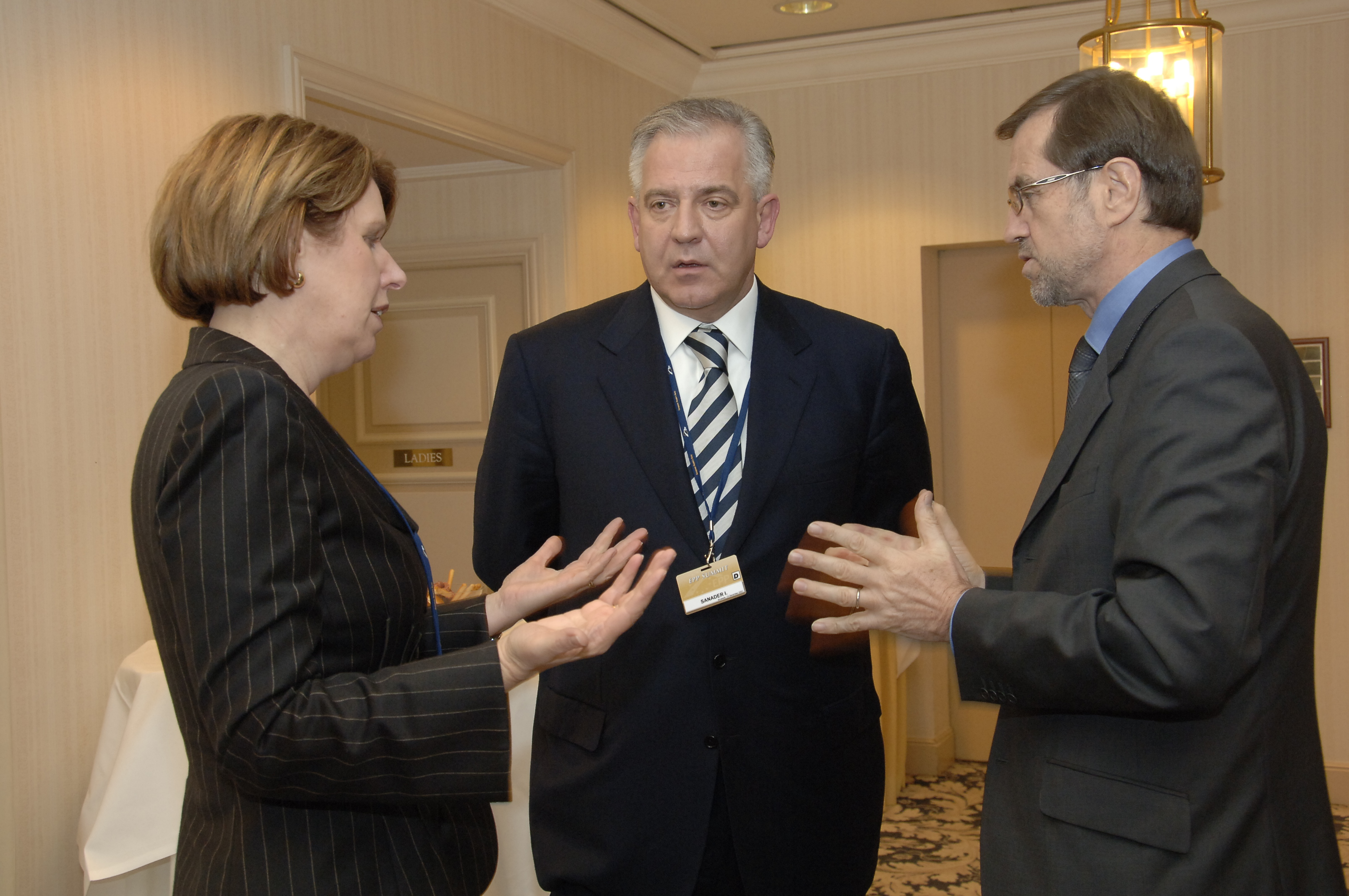
Peterle with Corien Wortmann-Kool (left) and Croatian Prime Minister Ivo Sanader, 13 December 2007

In 2002, Peterle became the 13th member of the steering committee of the Convention on the Future of Europe, which drafted the Treaty establishing a Constitution for Europe.

In the 2004 elections to the European Parliament, Peterle was elected for New Slovenia, as a member of the European People's Party (EPP). In March 2006, he was elected as Vice President of the European People's Party for a three-year term after recovering from cancer in April 2003.

Peterle served on the Committee on Foreign Affairs of the European Parliament. He was also a member of the Subcommittee on Human Rights from 2004 until 2009.

In addition to his committee assignments, Peterle chaired the parliament's delegation to the EU-former Yugoslav Republic of Macedonia Joint Parliamentary Committee since 2014. He previously served on the delegations for relations with the countries of Southeast Asia and the Association of Southeast Asian Nations (2004–2009), to the EU-Russia Parliamentary Cooperation Committee (2009–2014), to the EU-Croatia Joint Parliamentary Committee (2009–2013) and for relations with Japan (2013–2014). He was also a supporter of the MEP Heart Group, a group of parliamentarians who have an interest in promoting measures that will help reduce the burden of cardiovascular diseases (CVD).

In November 2006, Peterle announced that he would be running for President of Slovenia in the 2007 presidential election. Backed by most of the centre-right government, he was considered the front-runner before the first round of the election, but ultimately lost in a landslide to Danilo Türk in the second round.

He is a founder and current President of the group MEPs Against Cancer (MAC).

In September 2016, Peterle joined more than 50 MEPs from six different political groups – including Christofer Fjellner, Ashley Fox, Vicky Ford and Beatrix von Storch – in signing a proposal for a two-term limit of the President of the European Parliament. This move was widely seen as an effort to prevent incumbent Martin Schulz from holding onto the presidency for a third consecutive term.

Peterle was not re-elected to the European Parliament at the 2019 European Parliament election in Slovenia.

== Other activities ==
Peterle is president of the Slovenian beekeepers association and hosted the 2003 Apimondia beekeepers congress in Ljubljana.

== Honours ==
- Order of Freedom of the Republic of Slovenia
- Alois Mock Europa Ring
- Josef Krainer Prize
- European of the Year 2003 (European Voice)
- Meritee Europeen In Gold 2004

Political offices
Preceded by Dušan Šinigoj as Prime Minister of the Socialist Republic of Slovenia	Prime Minister of Slovenia; 1990–1992	Succeeded by Janez Drnovšek
Preceded by Dimitrij Rupel	Minister of Foreign Affairs; 1993–1994	Succeeded by Zoran Thaler
Preceded by Dimitrij Rupel	Minister of Foreign Affairs; 2000	Succeeded by Dimitrij Rupel
Party political offices
Preceded by Peter Kovačič Peršin	President of the Christian Democrats; 1989–2000	Position abolished
