= Zoran Thaler =

Slovenian politician and businessman

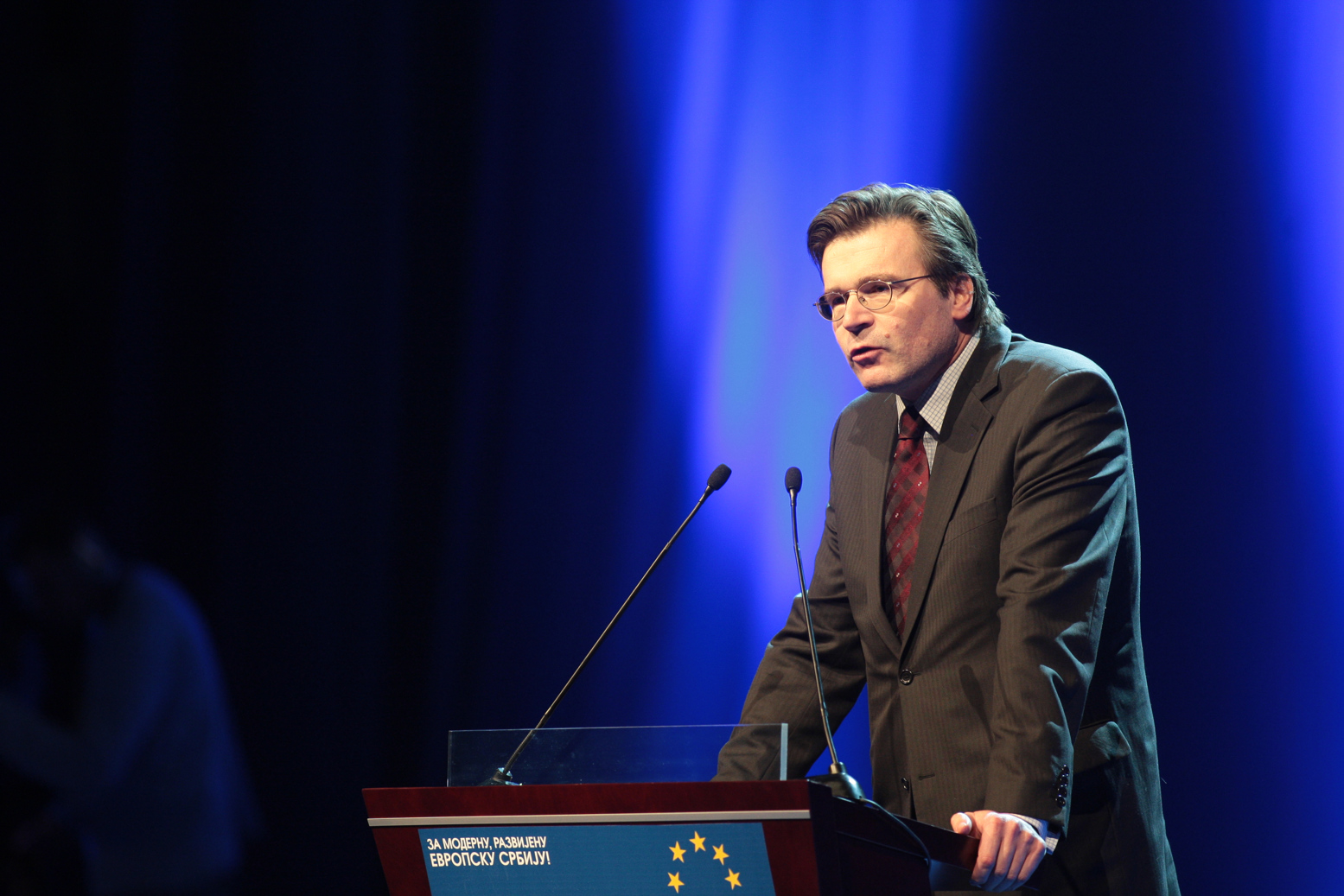

Zoran Thaler (born 21 January 1962 (age 64)) is a Slovenian politician and businessman. He is a former Slovenian foreign minister and a former member of the European Parliament.

== Political career ==
He was born in Kranj in former Yugoslavia (now in Slovenia). He graduated from political science at the Faculty of Social Sciences of the University of Ljubljana. He started his political career in the Alliance of the Socialist Youth of Slovenia (ZSMS), the largely autonomous youth and student organisation, many times in opposition to the League of Communists of Slovenia.

In the first free elections in Slovenia, he was elected to the Slovenian Parliament as member of the Alliance of the Socialist Youth of Slovenia – Liberal Party (later renamed to Liberal Democratic Party) and became Deputy Foreign Minister (1990–1993) in first democratic Government of Slovenia ruled by the DEMOS coalition. He was re-elected to the Parliament in 1992 and 1996 on the list of the ruling Liberal Democracy of Slovenia. Between 1993 and 1995, he served as Chairman of the Foreign Affairs Committee in the Parliament.

In January 1995, he was nominated Minister of Foreign Affairs of Slovenia in the government of Janez Drnovšek, after Lojze Peterle of the Slovene Christian Democrats had resigned. Thaler's term in office was marked by tensions with neighbouring Italy, which had already begun in the previous years. The disagreements between the two countries were mostly centered around the issue of property restitution to Italian refugees from Yugoslavia from the late 1940s. Thaler was involved in several negotiations with the Italian Foreign Minister Susanna Agnelli, in which he unblocked the Italian veto to Slovenia's access to the European Union. The Italian counterpart demanded that Slovenia changed its constitutional provisions which prevented foreign citizens to acquire real estates in Slovenia. In 1996, Slovenia agreed to the so-called "Spanish compromise", in which Slovenia promised to liberalize its property market regulations, allowing Italian and other EU citizens to purchase real estate in Slovenia. This resulted in the unblock of the Italian veto to Slovenia's access to the European Union. The deal made it possible for Slovenia to sign the Association Agreement with the EU on 10 June 1996 in Luxembourg and formally apply for membership in the EU the same day.

In May 1996, Thaler was impeached by the Parliament. In the final impeachment vote, a part of the ruling coalition (MPs from the Slovene Christian Democrats) joined the two major opposition forces (the Slovenian People's Party and the Social Democratic Party of Slovenia).

In December 1996, Thaler was re-elected to Parliament on the list of the Liberal Democracy of Slovenia. In 1997 he became again Minister of Foreign Affairs in Janez Drnovšek's third cabinet. During his mandate, the Parliament ratified the Association Agreement with the EU, after having changed the Constitution a day earlier in accordance with the Spanish compromise. The European Commission gave a positive opinion on the Slovenian application for membership shortly afterwards. After that achievement Thaler left politics for business. Between 2004 and 2006, he served as chairman of Si.mobil, Slovenia's second largest mobile operator.

In 2009, he headed the list of the Social Democrats for the European Parliament, not being a member of the party and was elected on 7 June 2009. As a member of the European Parliament, Thaler was EP Rapporteur for Macedonia, vice-chairman of the EP Delegation for the South Caucasus, and a member of EP Foreign Affairs Committee.

In March 2011, The Sunday Times implicated Thaler among other members of the European Parliament in a cash-for-laws scandal. Rupert Murdoch's Sunday Times also provided edited video of Thaler discussing adding amendments to EU laws with undercover journalists.

On 21 March he resigned as a member of the European Parliament. European Anti-fraud Office – OLAF investigated the case. In January 2012 OLAF concluded the investigation with the decision that there was "no infringement" on Thaler's side.

Political offices
Preceded by Lojze Peterle	Minister of Foreign Affairs of Slovenia; 26 January 1995 – 19 July 1996	Succeeded by Davorin Kračun
Preceded by Davorin Kračun	Minister of Foreign Affairs of Slovenia; 27 February 1997 – 25 September 1997	Succeeded by Boris Frlec
