= Samuel Žbogar =

Slovenian diplomat and politician

H.E. Samuel Žbogar
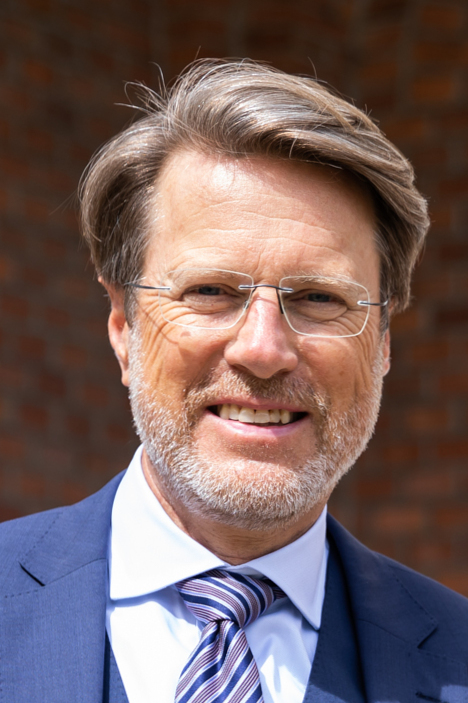
- Žbogar in 2022

President of the United Nations Security Council
- In office 1 December 2025 – 1 January 2026
- Preceded by: Michael Imran Kanu
- Succeeded by: Abukar Dahir Osman

Permanent Representative of Slovenia to the United Nations
- Incumbent
- Assumed office March 2025

Personal details
- Born: 5 March 1962 (age 64) Ljubljana, PR Slovenia, Yugoslavia
- Spouse: Maja Žbogar

Samuel Žbogar (born 5 March 1962) is a Slovenian diplomat and politician who has served as his country's Permanent Representative to the United Nations in New York since 2025, having previously held various foreign policy roles at the Slovenian Ministry of Foreign Affairs and in the European Union.

== Early life and education ==
Born in Postojna, Žbogar spent his youth in Nova Gorica. He attended the Nova Gorica Grammar School, where he was a schoolmate of Borut Pahor, who later served as Prime Minister of Slovenia. Žbogar graduated with a degree in international relations from the Faculty of Social Sciences of the University of Ljubljana.

In addition to Slovene, he speaks Serbo-Croatian, Macedonian, English, Italian and French.

== Career ==
In 1993, Žbogar opened the Slovenian Embassy in Beijing, China, where he worked to 1995. Between 1997 and 2001, he was Deputy Ambassador to the United Nations and the Deputy of Slovenia's Permanent Representative to the United Nations Security Council during Slovenia's elected membership in 1998 and 1999. At the time, Slovenia's representative was Danilo Türk, who later served as President of Slovenia. Between 2001 and 2004, he was State Secretary at the Ministry of Foreign Affairs in the cabinets of Janez Drnovšek and Anton Rop. During this period, he supported the strengthening of the humanitarian aspect of foreign policy and led the project group for the preparation of Slovenia's Organization for Security and Co-operation in Europe presidency. In 2004, he was appointed Ambassador to the United States. He was also a member of the European Union membership negotiation group and the main negotiator for NATO membership.

After returning from Washington, D.C. in 2008, Žbogar became the Director of the Institute for Strategic Studies in Ljubljana. The same year, he was named Minister of Foreign Affairs in the centre-left government of Borut Pahor. In December 2011, Catherine Ashton, the EU High Representative for Foreign Affairs and Security Policy, appointed Žbogar as head of the EU's office in Kosovo and as the special representative of the EU, the first Slovenian high-ranking official in the European External Action Service. In 2023 he became head of the Slovenian special mission to the United Nations Security Council for the duration of the Slovenian membership (2024−2025).

In 2025 Žbogar was appointed his country's Permanent Representative to the United Nations, and served as President of the Security Council in December 2025.

Political offices
Preceded by Dimitrij Rupel	Foreign Minister of Slovenia; November 2008 - February 2012	Succeeded by Karl Erjavec
